= Radfan Campaign =

Series of British military actions in Yemen

- Part of Aden Emergency
Date	14 October 1963–May 1964
Location	Radfan
Result	British victory

Belligerents
(Yemen) NLF; FLOSY; Radfan tribesmen	United Kingdom

Commanders and leaders
(Yemen) Rajih Labouza † (Yemen) Ali Antar	(United Kingdom) Gen. John Cubbon

Units involved
Unknown	British Army; Royal Marines; Royal Air Force

Strength
Unknown	1,000+ troops 45 marines

Casualties and losses
	4+ killed

The Radfan Campaign was a series of clashes that took place during the Aden Emergency from 14 October 1963–May 1964. It took place in the mountainous Radfan region near the border with the Yemen Arab Republic. Local tribesmen connected with the NLF began raiding the road connecting Aden with the town of Dhale.

In January 1964, the local army sent three battalions supported by the RAF to restore order. Trouble flared up again, and in April, British ground troops were sent in; by May, they had taken the main rebel stronghold and the revolt had been suppressed. The NLF then switched its attention to Aden itself.

The first British operation in January was known as "Nut cracker". The second one was "Cap Badge".

== Edwards patrol ==
The best-known action of the Campaign involved a patrol led by Captain Edwards on 29 April 1964, which came under attack. It led to the death of Edwards and another soldier, Sapper John Warburton. They were beheaded and their heads displayed in the Yemeni Capital.

British troops then attacked the area and succeeded in capturing rebel positions, although two more British soldiers were killed.

The British went on to use tanks and jets in the fight.
