= 1963 in South Yemen =

- Decades: 1960s; 1970s; 1980s
- See also: Other events of 1963; Timeline of Yemeni history

The following lists events that happened during 1963 in South Yemen.

== Events ==
=== October ===
- October 14 - A revolution starts in Radfan against British colonial rule.

=== December ===
- December 10 - A grenade is thrown at a gathering of British officials at Aden Airport, resulting in a state of emergency being declared in the British Crown colony.
