= Withdrawal from Aden =

1967 British withdrawal from Yemen

- Part of Aden Emergency
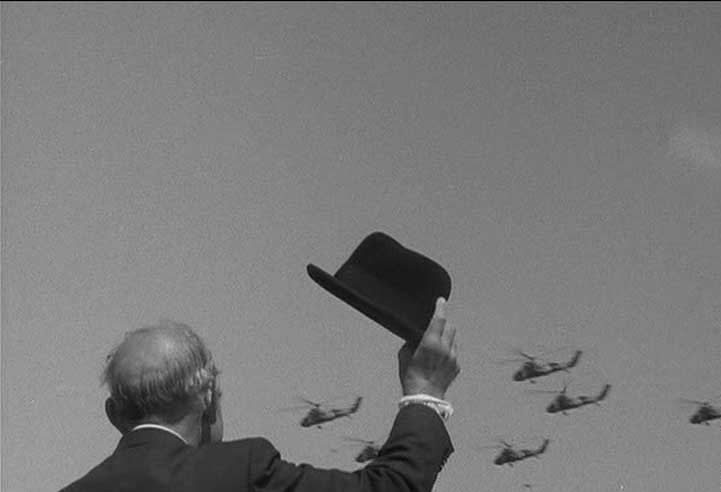
- Sir Humphrey Trevelyan waving to departing British helicopters on 30 November 1967.
Date	30 November 1967
Location	Aden
Result	NLF victory: End of the Aden Emergency; Independence of South Yemen

Belligerents
United Kingdom	National Liberation Front (NLF)

Commanders and leaders
(United Kingdom) Humphrey Trevelyan	Qahtan al-Shaabi

Strength
3,500	Unknown

NLF celebrations on 30 November

The withdrawal from Aden was the final withdrawal of British troops from the colony of Aden, 128 years and 10 months after the Aden Expedition first brought the territory under British control. High Commissioner Sir Humphrey Trevelyan boarded an RAF aircraft at RAF Khormaksar after a short handover ceremony on 30 November 1967. The last troops to leave were the Royal Engineers.

The withdrawal meant the end of the Aden Emergency and the dissolution of both the Federation of South Arabia (including Aden) and the eastern Protectorate of South Arabia. The National Liberation Front (South Yemen) would declare the independence of South Yemen 11 hours after the last British troops had left although its conflict with the Nasser-supported Front for the Liberation of Occupied South Yemen continued into the following year. The latter would be defeated with covert British support.

== Bibliography ==
- Mawby, Spencer (2005). British policy in Aden and the protectorates 1955-67: last outpost of a Middle East empire (2005 ed.). Routledge. ISBN 978-0-7146-5459-1.
