= Children's Party attack =

Attack in Aden, Yemen

- Part of the Aden Emergency
- Location: RAF Khormaksar, Aden
- Date: December 1964
- Attack type: Bombing
- Deaths: 1
- Injuries: 4
- Perpetrator: NLF

The Children's Party attack was an attack which took place during the Aden Emergency. Terrorists threw a grenade into a children's party being held at the RAF Khormaksar. One girl was killed (Gillian Sidey, daughter of Air Commodore E. Sidey) and four children wounded.

It was part of a general outbreak of violence around Christmas in Aden 1964: on 26 December Inspector Fadhl Khalil of Aden Special Branch was shot dead when terrorists fired at him and four other policemen in the bazaar at Crater Town. On Christmas Eve, a British sentry shot dead an Arab.
