= Aden Street riots =

1967 anti-British riots in Aden

- Part of Aden Emergency
Date	January–February 1967
Location	Aden, Federation of South Arabia

Belligerents
United Kingdom: Federation of South Arabia	(Yemen) NLF; FLOSY

Commanders and leaders
Sir Richard Turnbull	Unknown

The Aden Street riots took place in early 1967 during the Aden Emergency. On 19–20 January 1967 the NLF prompted street rioting in Aden. The Aden police lost control, so British High Commissioner Sir Richard Turnbull deployed British troops to crush the riots. This was followed by pro-FLOSY rioters taking to the streets which then led to conflict with British troops until February. The mood created by the riots helped lead to the Arab Police mutiny.

There had previously been riots in Aden in October 1965.
