= Stuart Poole-Robb =

British security and intelligence expert

Stuart Anthony Poole-Robb
- Born: October 1944 (age 81); United Kingdom
- Occupations: Security expert, author, and businessperson
- Known for: MD of the KCS Group and books on security
- Notable work: Risky Business

Stuart Poole-Robb is a British security, intelligence expert and author who in 2007 was appointed Managing Director of the KCS Group Europe, a London-headquartered strategic intelligence and risk management consultancy company.

== Early life and military service ==
Poole-Robb’s experience in intelligence and security began when he served in the Royal Air Force, mainly in Middle East locations, before moving to the Special Investigation Branch. Following special forces training which included cold weather survival courses in Norway and hot weather training in Borneo, he received intensive weapons, counter-insurgency and counter-terrorism training. He latterly saw service in Aden, Egypt, Libya, Nigeria and Oman with his military career culminating in a tour of duty in Yemen.

== Career ==
On leaving the RAF, Poole-Robb’s knowledge and expertise were called upon by the British government’s Operations Research Unit (SIS), and during his time there he worked on covert assignments in the German Democratic Republic and the USSR.

Poole-Robb met and befriended Alan Bailey (Thomas Alan Bailey) in Berlin in 1964. Alan Bailey served military intelligence throughout the 1950s and early 1960s and was involved in the fight against drug-dealing in the Netherlands and Austria, and in intelligence work in Aden, Berlin and Prague (under Colin "Mad Mitch" Mitchell). In 1956, Bailey led a squad codenamed Operation Airborne that was parachuted into Cyprus to capture the Greek Cypriot leader Archbishop Makarios III. Both Bailey and Poole-Robb worked closely together at the Merchant International Group with Alan Bailey holding the position of Chairman from 1997 until 2002. Bailey and Poole-Robb co-wrote Risky Business: Corruption Fraud Terrorism and Other Threats to Global Business published in 2002. Thomas Alan Bailey died in 2002, aged 73.

Towards the end of the 1980s, and by then CEO of The Merchant International Group (MIG), Poole-Robb worked for the West German government's Treuhandanstalt, the agency formed following the merger of East and West Germany to sell the former’s assets to private buyers, as well as with other German agencies.

In 1999 MIG won a major award for its work in quantifying risk by AIRMIC, the Association of Insurers and Risk Managers with the creation of Grey Area Dynamics GAD's. In 2002 MIG was named the Risk Company of the year by Strategic Risk.

Following a hostile takeover of MIG in 2007, Poole-Robb joined the KCS Group and has since built up a team of specialists in the fields of intelligence and risk, including the formation in 2009 of a dedicated cyber crime division.

== Publications ==
The author of many papers and books on security, intelligence operations and worldwide threats, including Risky Business (first published in 2002 and subsequently twice updated and re-published), Poole-Robb is currently finishing his latest book The Intelligence Gap.

== Activities and Interests ==
Away from the world of covert operations and intelligence gathering, Poole-Robb practices martial arts. He is a 4th Dan in Shotokan Karate and chairman of the Martial Arts Federation of Great Britain. Poole-Robb is also an IADO practioneer and an active shootist with pistol and target rifle in both the UK & the USA.
