= Crater (Aden) =

Coordinates: 12.7775°N 45.0328°E

Crater مديرية صيرة Kraytar
- District
- Seera District
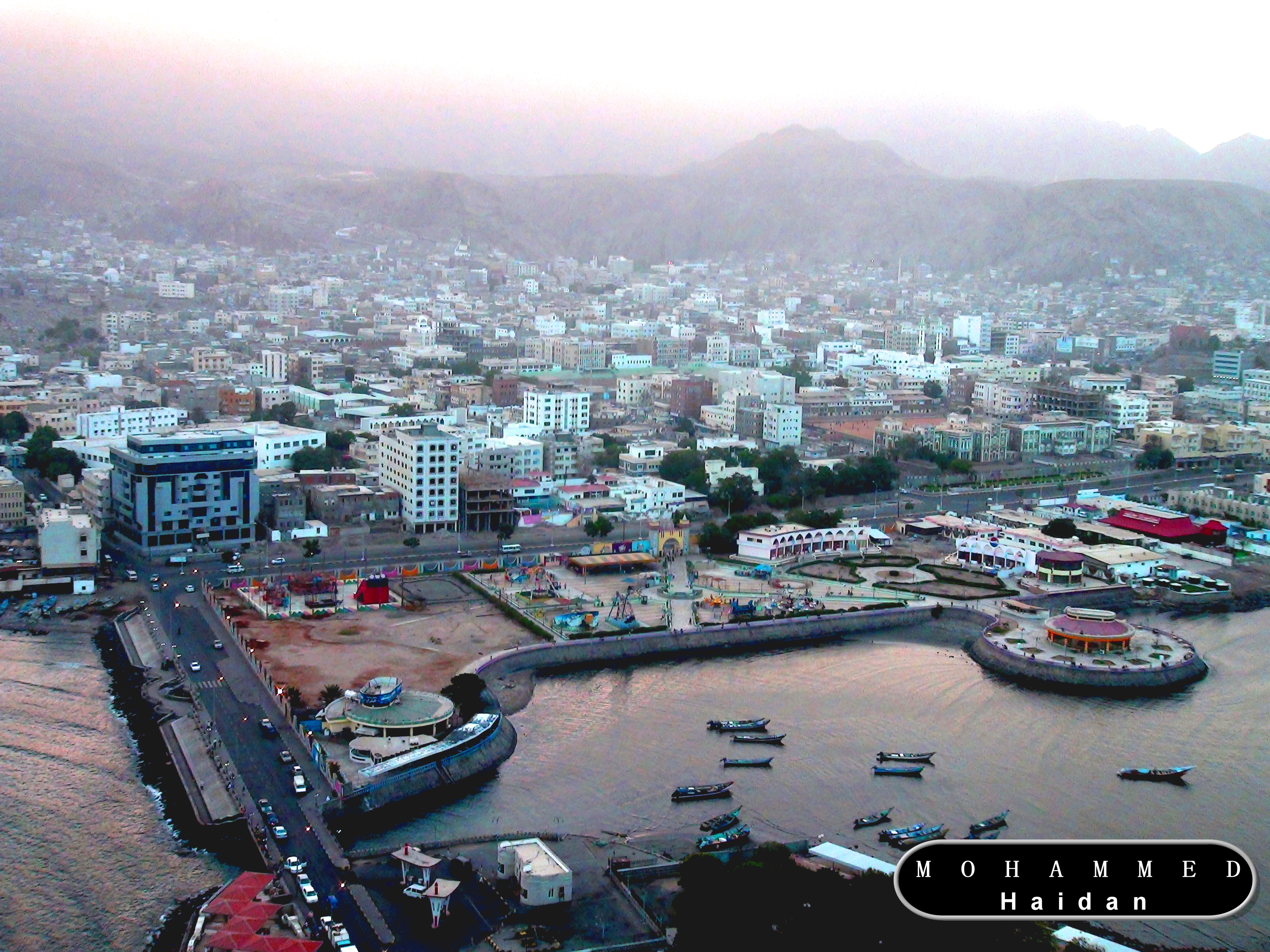
- View of Aden from Sira Fortress
- Interactive map of Crater
- Country: Yemen
- Governorate: Aden Governorate

Population (2003)
  - Total: 76,723
  - Density: 13/km^{2} (34/sq mi)
- Time zone: UTC+3 (Yemen Standard Time)

Crater (/ˈkreɪtər/; Arabic: كريتر, [ˈkɾeːtəɾ]), also Kraytar, is a district of the Aden Governorate, Yemen. Its official name is Seera (Arabic: صيرة Ṣīrah). It is situated in a crater of an ancient volcano which forms the Shamsan Mountains. As of 2003, the district had a population of 76,723 people.

== Etymology ==
The city's name, Crater, derives from the English word "crater", given by the British during their colonization of Aden, which is situated on an inactive volcano.

== History ==
=== Modern history ===
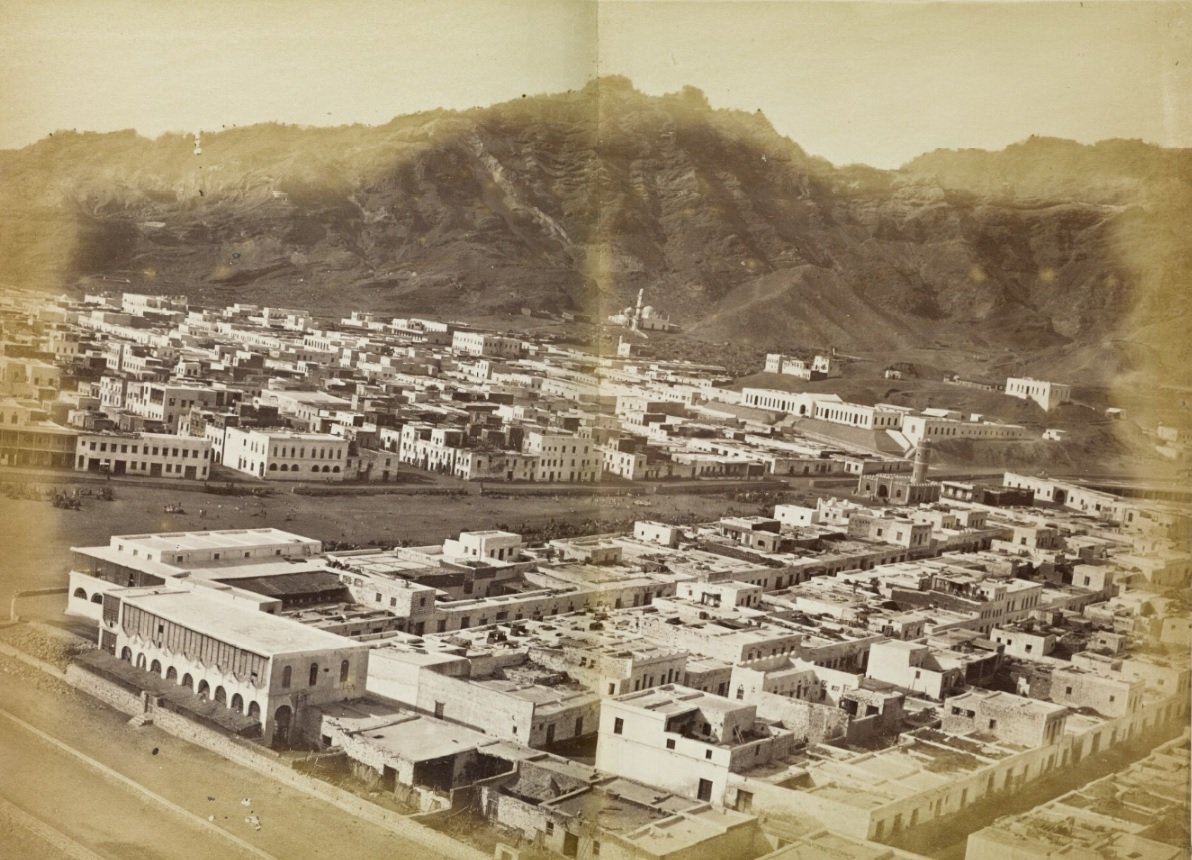
Crater in the mid-1870s.

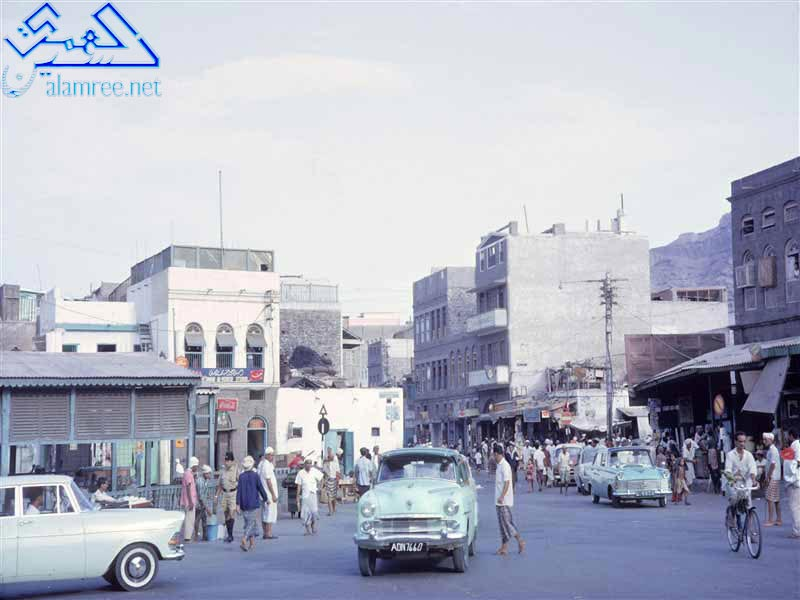
Crater in 1962

In the closing days of British rule in 1967, Crater District became the focus of the Aden Emergency, sometimes called the last imperial war. After a mutiny of hundreds of soldiers in the South Arabian Federation Army on 20 June, all British forces withdrew from Crater. Crater was occupied by Arab fighters while British forces blocked off its two main entrances.

On 3 July 1967, the Battle of Crater began with the Argyll and Sutherland Highlanders commanded by Lt-Col Colin Mitchell ("Mad Mitch") performing a night invasion of Crater, which he termed Operation Stirling Castle, after the Argylls' regimental headquarters. The National Liberation Front was taken by surprise, and effective resistance ceased. A particular sign of Mitchell's confidence was his decision to order the pipe band to march down the main street of Crater, playing regimental tunes, for which the Pipe major was mentioned in despatches. British troops remained in Crater until the end of the Emergency.

== Tourist views ==
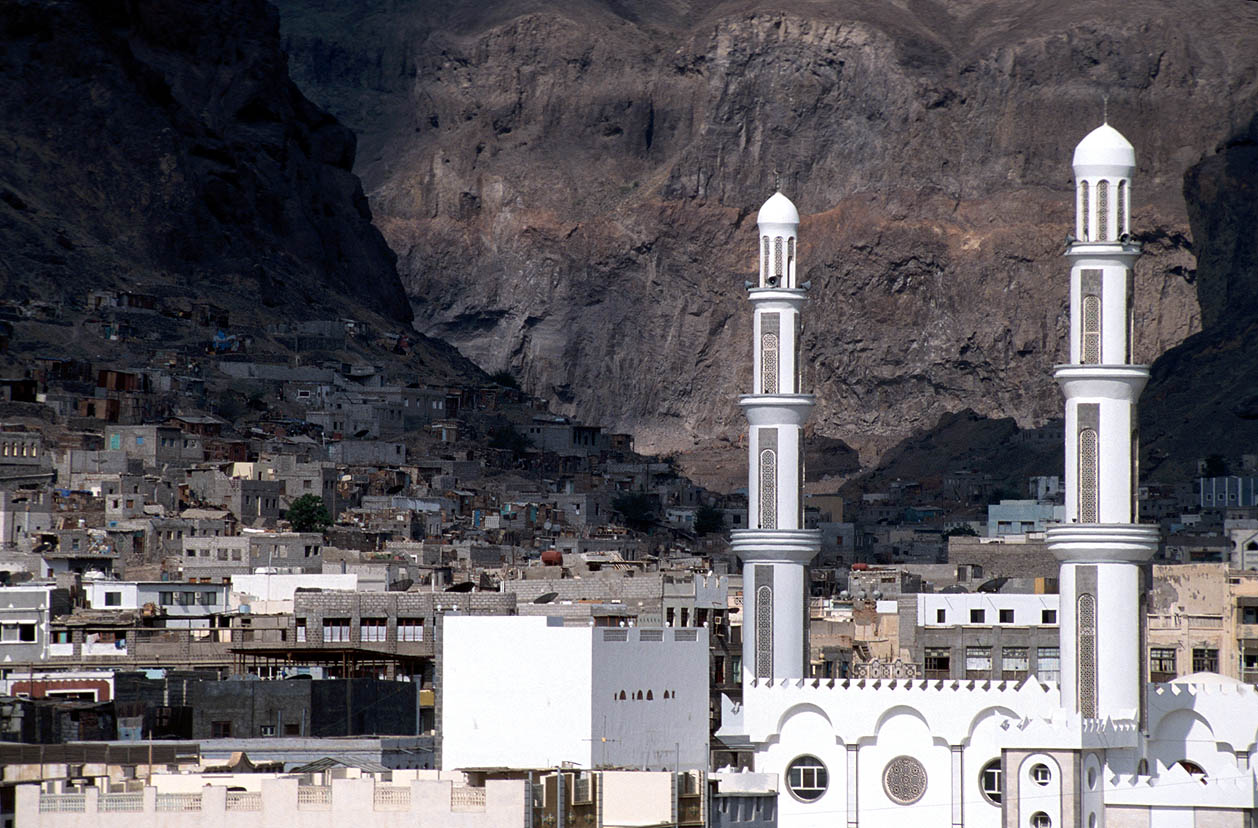
Aban Mosque in Crater

- Sira Fortress
- Cisterns of Tawila
- Aden lighthouse
- Bab Aden
- Gate of Aden
- Legislative Council of Aden
- Aban Mosque
- Aidrus Mosque
- Abdali Sultan Palace

== Geography ==
=== Climate ===
Crater's climate is dominated all year by the subtropical anticyclone, or subtropical high, with its descending air, elevated inversions and clear skies. The Köppen Climate Classification subtype for this climate is BWh (Tropical and Subtropical Desert).

Climate data for Crater, Yemen
Month	Jan	Feb	Mar	Apr	May	Jun	Jul	Aug	Sep	Oct	Nov	Dec	Year
Mean daily maximum °C (°F)	32 (90)	32 (90)	34 (93)	35 (95)	38 (100)	39 (102)	39 (102)	39 (102)	38 (100)	35 (95)	33 (91)	32 (90)	36 (96)
Daily mean °C (°F)	27 (81)	27 (81)	29 (84)	30 (86)	33 (91)	34 (93)	34 (93)	33 (91)	32 (90)	29 (84)	28 (82)	27 (81)	30 (86)
Mean daily minimum °C (°F)	22 (72)	22 (72)	24 (75)	25 (77)	27 (81)	28 (82)	28 (82)	27 (81)	27 (81)	24 (75)	23 (73)	22 (72)	25 (77)
Average precipitation mm (inches)	0 (0)	2 (0.1)	6 (0.2)	15 (0.6)	12 (0.5)	0 (0)	10 (0.4)	11 (0.4)	5 (0.2)	0 (0)	0 (0)	0 (0)	61 (2.4)
Average precipitation days	0	1	1	2	2	0	2	3	2	0	0	0	13
Mean monthly sunshine hours	248	232	279	270	310	270	217	248	270	310	270	279	3,203
Source: weather2travel.com
