= Battle of Crater =

1967 battle during the Aden Emergency

- Part of Aden Emergency
Date	July 1967
Location	Aden, Aden Protectorate
Result	British victory

Belligerents
United Kingdom	(Yemen) NLF; FLOSY

Commanders and leaders
Lt. Col. Colin Mitchell; Maj. Ian Mackay; Maj. Tony Shewan	Unknown

Units involved
45 Commando; Argyll and Sutherland Highlanders; Queen's Dragoon Guards; Royal Northumberland Fusiliers; 60th Squadron, Royal Engineers; 47th Light Artillery Regiment; 15th Signal Regiment; 60th Transport Squadron	Unknown

Strength
Unknown; 1 helicopter	400

Casualties and losses
None	11 killed

The Battle of Crater, also known by the British as Operation Stirling Castle, was a battle that took place in July 1967 during the Aden Emergency. After the mutiny of the Arab Armed Police and ambush of British troops by them, the Crater district in Aden was abandoned by British troops. The British then decided to enter Crater and retrieve the bodies of dead British soldiers.

== The battle ==
The operation began on 3 July 1967 with the Argyll and Sutherland Highlanders commanded by Lt-Col Colin Mitchell ("Mad Mitch") performing a night invasion of Crater, which he termed Operation Stirling Castle, after the Argylls’ regimental headquarters. The enemy was taken totally by surprise, and effective resistance ceased. A particular sign of Mitchell’s confidence was his decision to order the pipe band to march down the main street of Crater, playing regimental tunes, for which the Pipe major was mentioned in despatches. British troops remained in Crater until the end of the Emergency.
