= State of Aden =

British protectorate (1963–1967)

Coordinates: 12°48′N 45°02′E

State of Aden وِلْاَيَةْ عَدَنْ
- State of the Federation of South Arabia
- 1963–1967
- Flag

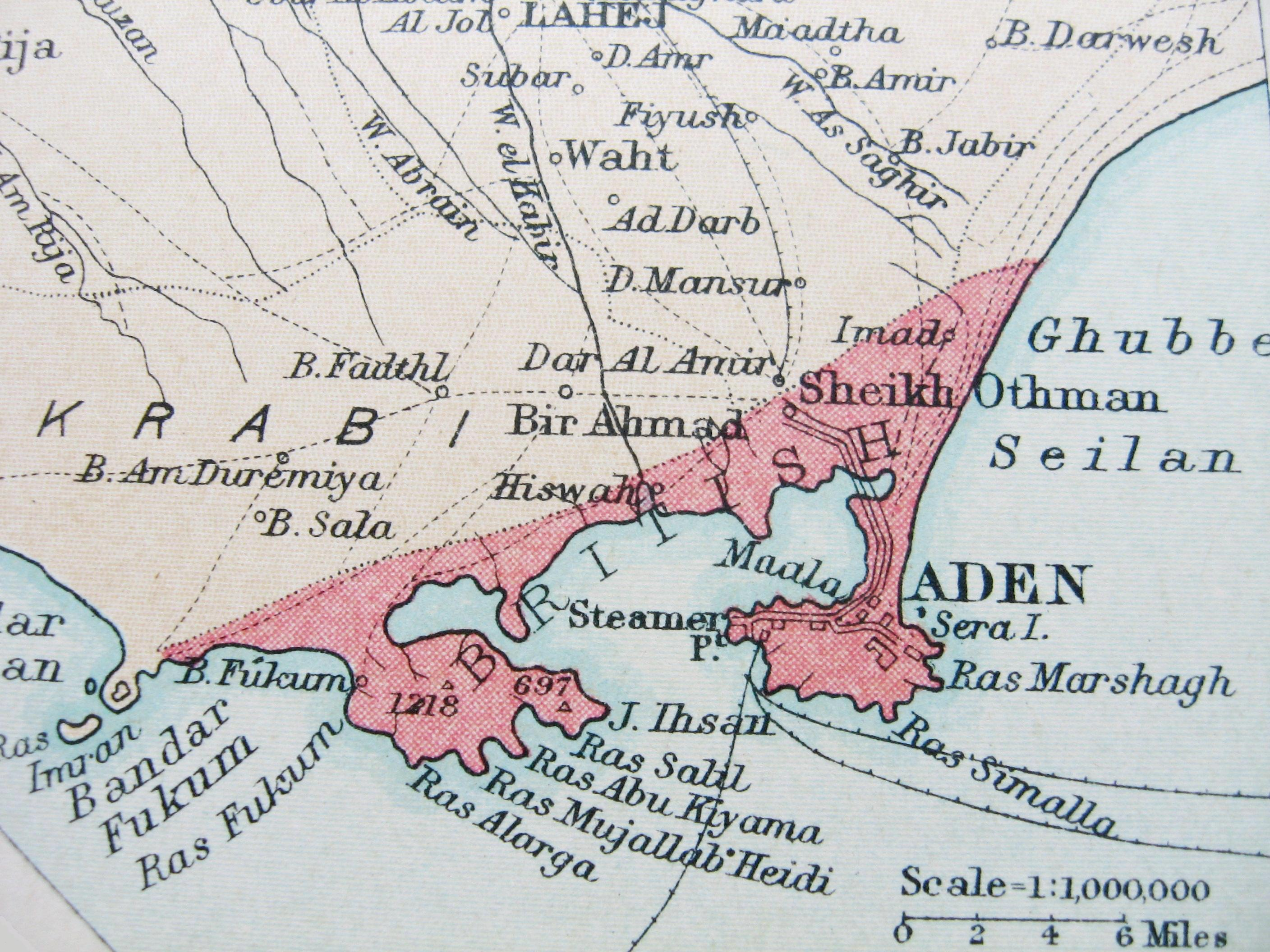
- Map of British Aden (1922)
- Capital: Aden
- Area
- 192 km^{2} (74 sq mi)
- Legislature: Legislative Council
- History
  - Federation of South Arabia established: 18 January 1963
  - State of Aden disestablished: 30 November 1967
Preceded by	Succeeded by
Aden Colony	South Yemen

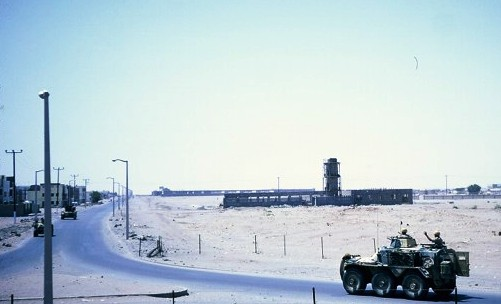
Saracen armored vehicle on patrol in Aden in 1966.

The State of Aden (Arabic: وِلْاَيَةْ عَدَنْ Wilāyat ʿAdan) was a state constituted in Aden within the Federation of South Arabia. Following its establishment on 18 January 1963, Sir Charles Johnston stepped down as the last Governor of Aden.

In spite of the hopes placed in the Federation, the insurgency in Aden escalated and hastened the end of British presence in the territory with the British leaving Aden by the end of November 1967.

The State of Aden became part of the independent People's Republic of Southern Yemen on 30 November 1967, which today is part of the Republic of Yemen.

== History ==
To solve many of the problems the Colony of Aden faced, as well as continuing the process of self-determination that was accompanying the dismantling of the British Empire, it was proposed that the Colony of Aden should form a federation with the protectorates of East and West Aden. Under this scheme it was hoped that the conditions would be created to lessen Arab calls for complete independence, while still allowing British control of foreign affairs and the BP refinery at Little Aden to continue.

Federalism was first proposed by ministers from both the colony and protectorates: the suggested amalgamation would be beneficial, they argued, in terms of economics, race, religion and languages. However the step was illogical in terms of Arab Nationalism, for it was taken just prior to some impending elections, and was against the wishes of Aden Arabs, notably many of the trade unions.

An additional problem was the huge disparity in political development, as at the time Aden colony was some way down the road to self-government and in the opinion of some dissidents, political fusion with the autocratic and backward Sultanates was a step in the wrong direction.

In the federation, the former Aden Colony was to have 24 seats on the new council, while each of the eleven sultanates of the former Aden Protectorate was to have six. The federation as a whole would have financial and military aid from Britain.

=== Aden Emergency ===
Many of the problems that Aden had suffered in its time as a colony did not improve as a federated state. In the new federation the Aden Trade Union Congress (ATUC) had a large influence in the new assembly and to prevent it seizing control of the federation in 1962 the former Colony of Aden had joined the Federation of South Arabia so that Aden's pro-British assembly members could counter the ATUC's influence.

However, the day after State of Aden joined the federation the Muhammad al-Badr of the Yemenite monarchy was overthrown and civil war ensued between forces backed by Gamal Abdel Nasser such as the National Liberation Front (NLF) and monarchist forces backed by the Saudi Arabia and the United Kingdom. Internal disturbances continued and intensified, leading on 10 December 1963 to the Aden Emergency, when a state of emergency was declared in the largely dysfunctional Aden State.

Other events of the conflict that kept spreading throughout the region include the Battle of the Crater which brought Lt-Col Colin Campbell Mitchell (AKA. "Mad Mitch") to prominence. On June 20, 1967 there was a mutiny in the South Arabian Federation Army, which also spread to the police. Order was restored by the British, mainly owing to the efforts of the 1st Battalion Argyll and Sutherland Highlanders, under the command of Lt-Col Mitchell.

Nevertheless, deadly guerrilla attacks against British forces, particularly by the Egyptian-supported National Liberation Front (NLF), soon resumed in all their intensity. British presence finally ended with the final departure of British troops. The withdrawal was undertaken earlier than had been planned by British Prime Minister Harold Wilson and left the future state without an agreement on the succeeding governance. Finally the enemies of the State of Aden and the Federation, the NLF, managed to seize power.

On 30 November 1967 Aden State, together with the federation, became the People's Republic of South Yemen. In line with other formerly British Arab territories in the Middle East, the independent state did not join the British Commonwealth. The South Arabian dinar, however, continued at the one to one parity with sterling until 1972.

== See also ==
- Aden Protectorate
- British Forces Aden
- Aden Emergency
