= 1963 Aden airport attack =

1963 terrorist incident in Aden

- Part of the Aden Emergency
- Location: 12°49′46″N 045°01′45″E; Khormaksar Airport, Aden
- Date: December 10, 1963; 62 years ago c. 08:30 (UTC+3)
- Target: Kennedy Trevaskis
- Attack type: Grenade attack
- Weapon: No. 36 Mills bomb
- Deaths: 2
- Injuries: 49 (including Trevaskis)
- Perpetrator: (Yemen) National Liberation Front
- Assailant: 1

The 1963 Aden airport attack was an incident which saw the beginning of the Aden Emergency. Arab nationalists of the NLF made a grenade attack against the British High Commissioner, Sir Kennedy Trevaskis, immediately killing one person, a local woman, and injuring 50 others.

George Henderson, the assistant high commissioner, saved Sir Kennedy's life by pushing him out of the way. Henderson later died of his injuries, making the final toll two killed and forty-nine wounded.

The incident led to Britain declaring a state of emergency in South Arabia.

== Attack ==
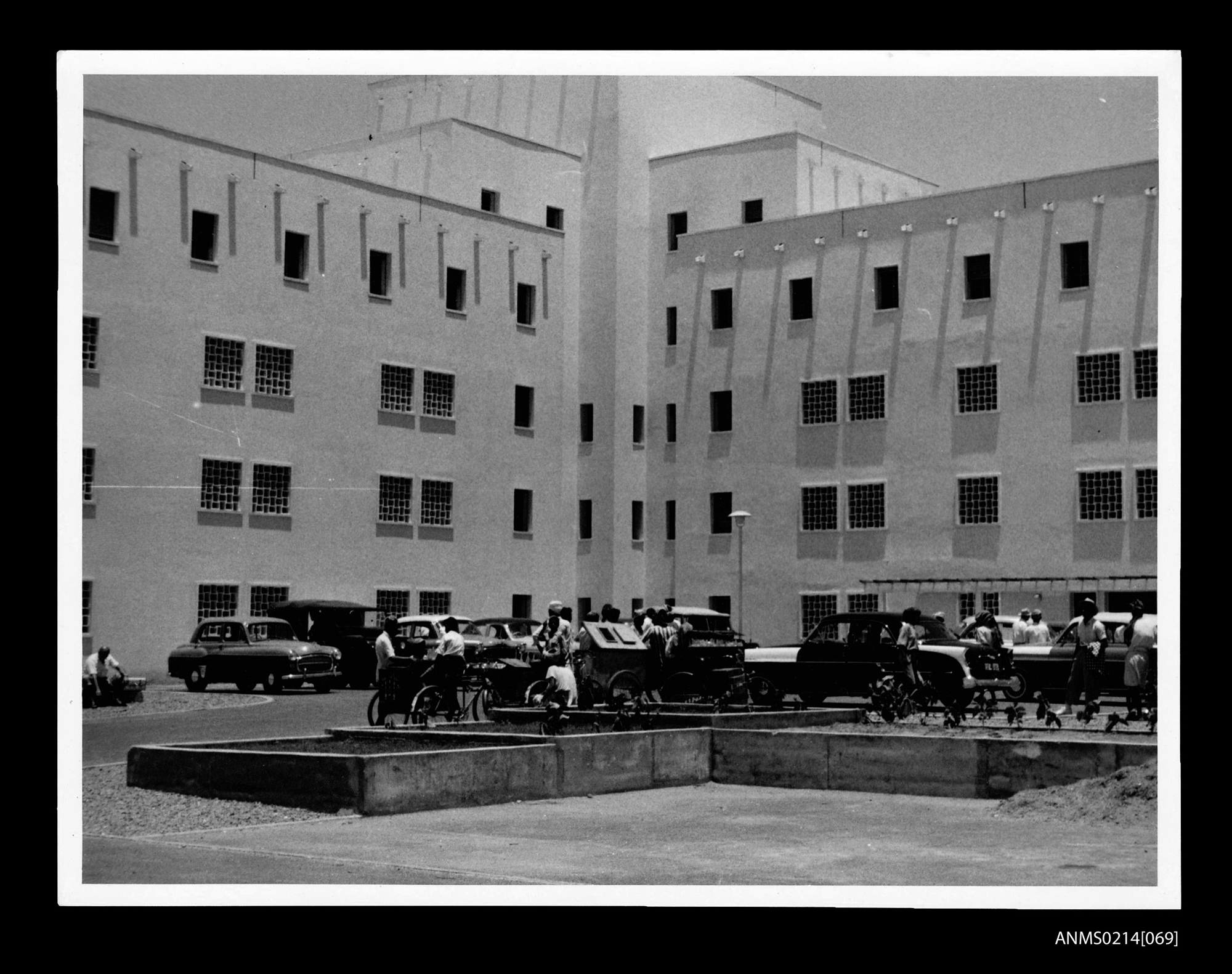
The victims of the attack were treated at Queen Elizabeth Hospital in Steamer Point.

On 10 December 1963, Trevaskis was to depart from Aden to London, where he alongside other colonial minister's would discuss issues relating to the Aden's constitution and its potential incorporation into the Federation of South Arabia with colonial secretary Duncan Sandys. He departed his residence alongside his wife after around 07:00, heading in an official limousine from Steamer Point (Tawahi) to the international airport in Aden, RAF Khormaksar. The limousine arrived outside the VIP lounge of the airport terminal as passengers were gathered to board BOAC Flight BA 237, a Comet jet airliner bound to London. Heading there alongside the officials were other "leading Aden citizens", while a group of Arab notables were also present to greet Trevaskis and wish him farewell.

Meanwhile, two undercover insurgents, Khalifa Abdulla Hasson Khalifa and his accomplice Mohamed Abdul Majid Miyya, were waiting within the passenger lounge for an opportunity to close the gap to the VIP section. A witness recalled that the former was carrying a blue registrar on him, as if he was pretending to be a supervisor at the airport. At around 08:30, shortly after Trevaskis had come through the gates and joined the crowd, Khalifa pulled out a No. 36 Mills bomb from his pocket and rolled it into them. Trevaskis later recalled in his journal:

Suddenly I heard a faint hissing noise. I turned round and saw a Mills bomb coloured green lying against the kerbs of a flowerbed with smoke coming out of it. Before I had time to react I was seized round the waist by George Henderson in something approximating to a rugger tackle and propelled towards the door of the building.

Seconds later, Trevaskis alongside police commissioner Arthur Wiltshire were able to escape through the gates before the grenade exploded. Godfrey Meynell, political officer for Dhala, and Trevaskis' wife, were speaking together when the grenade was rolled in. Sheila Trevaskis initially believed it to be a firework, casually turning around and covering her ears before an Indian woman walked between her and the device just as it detonated, completely absorbing the blast and inadvertently saving her.

Trevaskis, Wiltshire, and Henderson were immediately rushed in an official vehicle to Queen Elizabeth Hospital in Steamer Point. Trevaskis, who only suffered minor wounds to his hand, implored Wiltshire to let him go back to see his wife, but was refused. Henderson last said "Thank God you are safe, sir" to Trevaskis before he lost consciousness within the vehicle. Henderson received intensive treatment at the hospital for two weeks before he eventually died, specifically by pulmonary embolism "due to a collection of blood in the chest wound caused by a jagged piece of metal which pierced his right lung" according to the resident pathologist.

Two people in total had died; Henderson and the woman who stepped in front of Sheila Trevaskis. A further 49 people suffered injuries, some serious. They included three ministers; Wiltshire, interior minister Sharif Hussein Beiham and information minister Ahmed Abdullah, along with the British chief of public relations in Aden, Donald Foster, Sultan Ahmed Abdulla Fadhli, Colonel Lasser Saleh, BBC correspondent Kenneth Brazier, Yemeni royalist foreign minister Ahmed al-Shani, and a number of other civilians.
