= Rajih Labouza =

- Born: 1917; Radfan, Sultanate of Lahej
- Died: 14 October 1963 (aged 45–46)
- Political party: National Liberation Front

Rajih bin Ghalib Labouza (1917-14 October 1963) was a Yemeni revolutionary and tribal leader who was one of the leaders of the 14 October Revolution. Born in the Radfan district of Lahij, he grew up as an orphan in the Debsan area. He participated in the 26 September Revolution in North Yemen, and then returned to southern Yemen and settled in Radfan. Together with his comrades, he started the 14 October Revolution on the morning of 14 October 1963 and was killed in the early hours of the fighting against British forces.
