= No. 8 Squadron RAF =

Flying squadron of the Royal Air Force

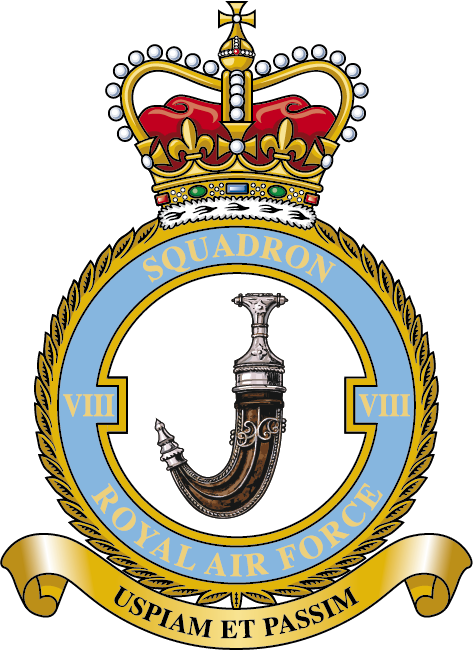
- Squadron badge
- Active: 1915–1918 (RFC); 1918–1920; 1920–1945; 1945; 1946–1971; 1972–present
- Country: United Kingdom
- Branch: Royal Air Force
- Type: Flying squadron
- Role: Airborne early warning and control
- Part of: ISTAR Force
- Station: RAF Lossiemouth
- Mottos: Uspiam et passim (Latin for 'Everywhere unbounded')
- Mascot: Augustus (A European eagle owl)
- Aircraft: E-7 Wedgetail

Insignia
- Roundel

Number 8 Squadron (sometimes written as No. VIII Squadron) is a squadron of the Royal Air Force. It is based at RAF Lossiemouth, Scotland and took delivery of its first Boeing E-7 Wedgetail AEW1 in May 2026. The Wedgetail is the replacement for the Boeing E-3D Sentry which the squadron operated from until 1991 to 2021.

== History ==
=== First World War (1915–1920) ===
As No. 8 Squadron of the Royal Flying Corps (RFC) it was formed at Brooklands, Surrey on 1 January 1915, equipped with the Royal Aircraft Factory B.E.2c. The squadron moved to Fort Grange, Gosport later on 6 January for further training, and crossed to France on 15 April 1915 to Saint-Omer. While its main equipment was the B.E.2c, it also operated a fighter flight between May 1915 and early 1916 equipped with a mixture of aircraft, including the Royal Aircraft Factory B.E.8 and the Bristol Scout, while it also evaluated the prototype Royal Aircraft Factory B.E.9, a modified B.E.2 that carried the observer/gunner in a nacelle ahead of the aircraft's propeller.

Operating from airfields near Saint-Omer, the squadron was initially used for bombing and long-range reconnaissance, carrying out flights of up to 100 miles (160 km) behind the front lines. In February 1916, it moved to Bellevue and specialised in the Corps Reconnaissance role, carrying out contact patrols and artillery spotting in close co-operation with the army. The squadron flew in support of the Battle of the Somme in the summer of 1916 and the Battle of Arras in April and May 1917. It received the improved B.E.2e from February 1917, but despite this, losses were heavy as all marks of B.E.2 were outclassed. The Armstrong Whitworth FK.8 replaced the B.E.2s in August 1917.

In June 1918, No. 8 Squadron, part of the Royal Air Force since 1 April 1918 and commanded by Major T. Leigh-Mallory, was allocated to the Tank Corps, flying contact patrols in support of the Tank Corps attacks during the Battle of Amiens, and becoming expert in spotting and destroying German anti-tank guns. The FK.8 and some tanks were equipped with wireless sets, although wireless communications between tanks and aeroplanes remained at a very basic stage for the rest of the war.

On 12 August 1918, Captain Ferdinand West of No. 8 Squadron was flying a F.K.8 on a contact patrol when he was attacked by seven German fighters. Despite a severe leg wound, West managed to manoeuvre his aircraft so that his observer could drive off the attacking fighters, before making a forced landing behind Allied lines and insisting in reporting the results of the flight. He was awarded the Victoria Cross for this action.

In December 1918, a few weeks after the Armistice with Germany that ended the First World War, the squadron re-equipped with Sunbeam Arab-engined Bristol F.2 Fighter. It served briefly in Germany as part of the British Army of Occupation, before moving back to the United Kingdom in July 1919 and disbanding on 20 January 1920.

=== Interwar period (1920–1939) ===
No. 8 Squadron reformed on 18 October 1920 at Helwan, near Cairo, Egypt, as a day-bomber squadron equipped with the Airco DH.9A. With the security of Iraq the responsibility of the RAF, the squadron moved to Basra in February 1921 to carry out air policing. The squadron was deployed to Kirkuk in July 1922, where it operated against a Kurdish rebellion and Turkish infiltration, and helping to evacuate forces allied to the British from the city of Sulaymaniyah in September 1922. In November and December 1923, the squadron was deployed against Marsh Arabs in the Mesopotamian Marshes.

Between 29 December 1921 and 27 February 1927, No. 8 Squadron was based at RAF Hinaidi in the southern suburbs of Baghdad. During that time, nine members of the squadron lost their lives in the service of their country and were buried at the Hinaidi RAF Peace Cemetery (later renamed the Ma’Asker Al Raschid RAF Cemetery). Though the cemetery has long been abandoned by the Commonwealth War Graves Commission, three of the No. 8 Squadron headstones have survived the ravages of time out of the three hundred burials at Ma’Asker.

In February 1927, in response to unrest in Aden, No. 8 Squadron was deployed to RAF Khormaksar, where it continued in the air policing role. The squadron replaced the elderly DH.9A with new Fairey IIIF light bombers from January 1928. It flew operations against Zaidi in February 1928 and against the Subaihi tribe, who were refusing to pay taxes and revolting, from January to March 1929. Operations against the Subaihi involved destroying crops with incendiary bombs and bombing villages after giving warning so they could be evacuated. This pressure eventually forced the Subaihi to sue for peace, with the rebel chiefs paying fines. More peaceful operation carried out by the squadron included survey flights, casualty evacuation and carrying mail, while the squadron carried out a long-distance return trip from Aden to Cairo and back in 1932.

In April 1935, it re-equipped again with the Vickers Vincent, a general purpose aircraft based on the Vickers Vildebeest biplane torpedo bomber. The squadron started to receive Bristol Blenheim twin-engined monoplane bombers in April 1939, but it retained a flight of Vincents for operations over the rough interior of the Aden Protectorate.

=== Second World War (1939–1945) ===
On 10 June 1940, Italy declared war on Britain and France. No 8 Squadron flew its first combat missions of the war on 12 June, when nine Blenheims bombed an airfield at Assab in Italian-occupied Eritrea, across the Red Sea from Aden, with five Vincents attacking the same airfield that night. On 5 August 1940, Italy invaded British Somaliland, and No. 8 Squadron's Blenheims flew missions against advancing Italian troop columns. The Italians heavily outnumbered the British and Commonwealth defences, and the port of Berbera was occupied by the Italians on 19 August.

The unit continued to be based at RAF Khormaksar in Aden equipped with Bristol Blenheims. The Vickers Wellington XIII was flown from December 1943 until May 1945.

=== Post-War (1945–1971) ===
On 15 May 1945, No. 8 Squadron reformed by renumbering No. 200 Squadron at RAF Jessore in India, equipped with the Consolidated Liberator VI. The squadron again disbanded on 15 November 1945.

The squadron was reformed at Khormaksar on 1 September 1946 by renumbering No. 114 Squadron and the role of fighter bomber was adopted, initially with the de Havilland Mosquito FB.6. These were replaced by the Hawker Tempest, and the Bristol Brigand. These fighter was supported by the Anson C.19 and Auster AOP.6. The squadron's first jet aircraft were received in 1953 when it equipped with the de Havilland Vampire FB.9. Continued updating of equipment brought the de Havilland Venom FB.1 and FB.4 and the Hawker Hunter, flown from 1960 until 1971. The squadron disbanded on 21 December 1971.

=== Shackletons and Sentries (1972–2021) ===
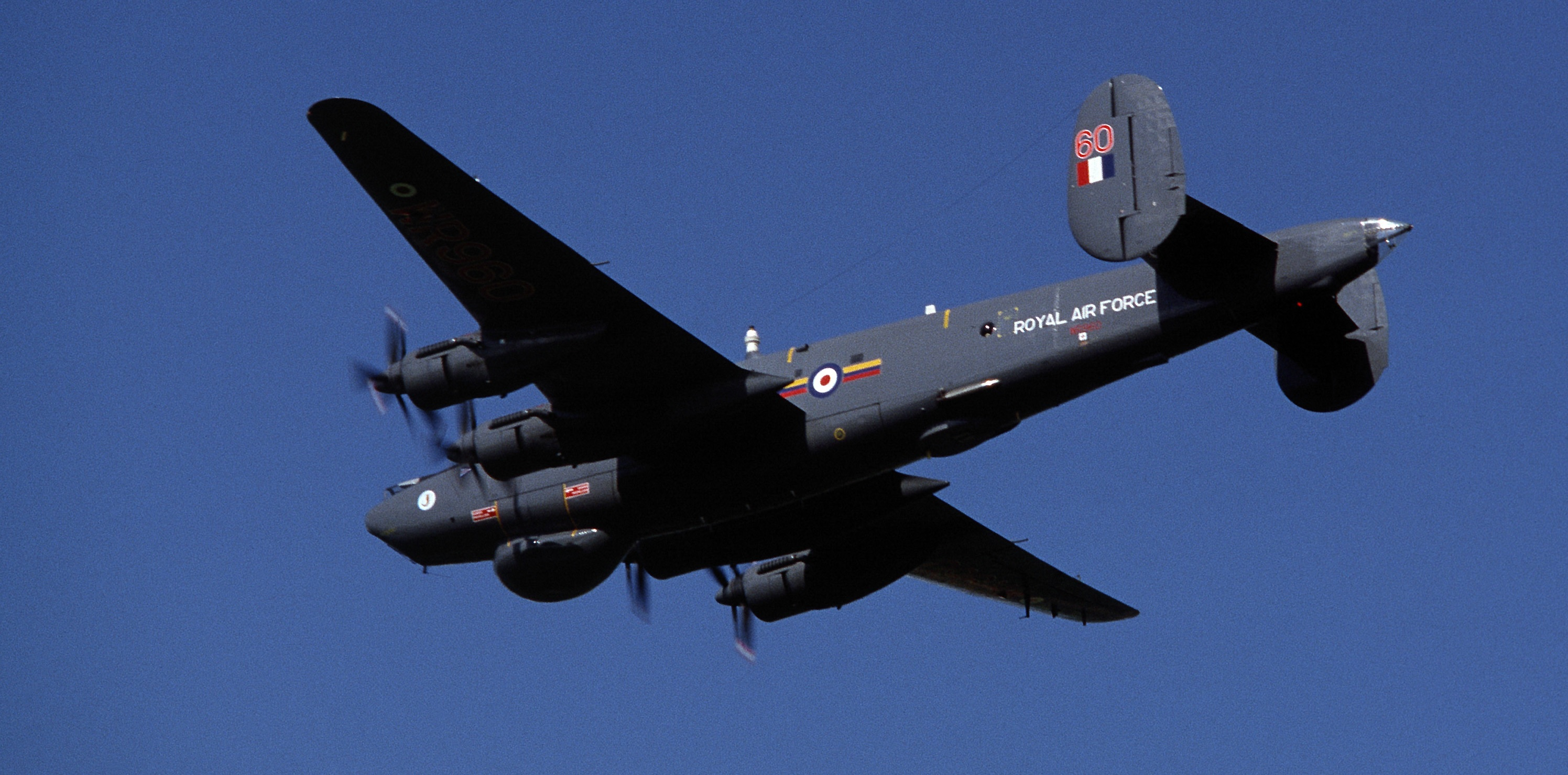
An Avro Shackleton AEW.2 of No. 8 Squadron in 1982

The squadron reformed at RAF Kinloss on 1 January 1972 in the Airborne Early Warning (AEW) role using the Avro Shackleton AEW.2. It moved to RAF Lossiemouth on 14 August 1973, where it stayed until 1991 when it moved to RAF Waddington near Lincoln and re-equipped with the Boeing E-3D Sentry. The first of seven Sentries was handed over to the RAF on 26 March 1991 and the last during May 1992. The squadron was deployed over the Balkans in the early 1990s; it also saw action over Iraq in 2009 and Afghanistan in 2010 and was then involved in Operation Ellamy in 2011 during the Libyan Civil War.

In early 2015, No. 8 Squadron deployed with two Sentries to RAF Akrotiri, Cyprus, to participate in Operation Shader.

Two Sentries deployed to RAF Akrotiri on Cyprus in late May and early June 2021 to support Carrier Strike Group 21 as it passed through the Mediterranean Sea. The E-3D's final operational sortie was carried out on 30 July, with the two aircraft returning to Waddington on 2 August and 4 August. The Sentry was officially retired by the RAF on 28 September 2021.

== Future ==
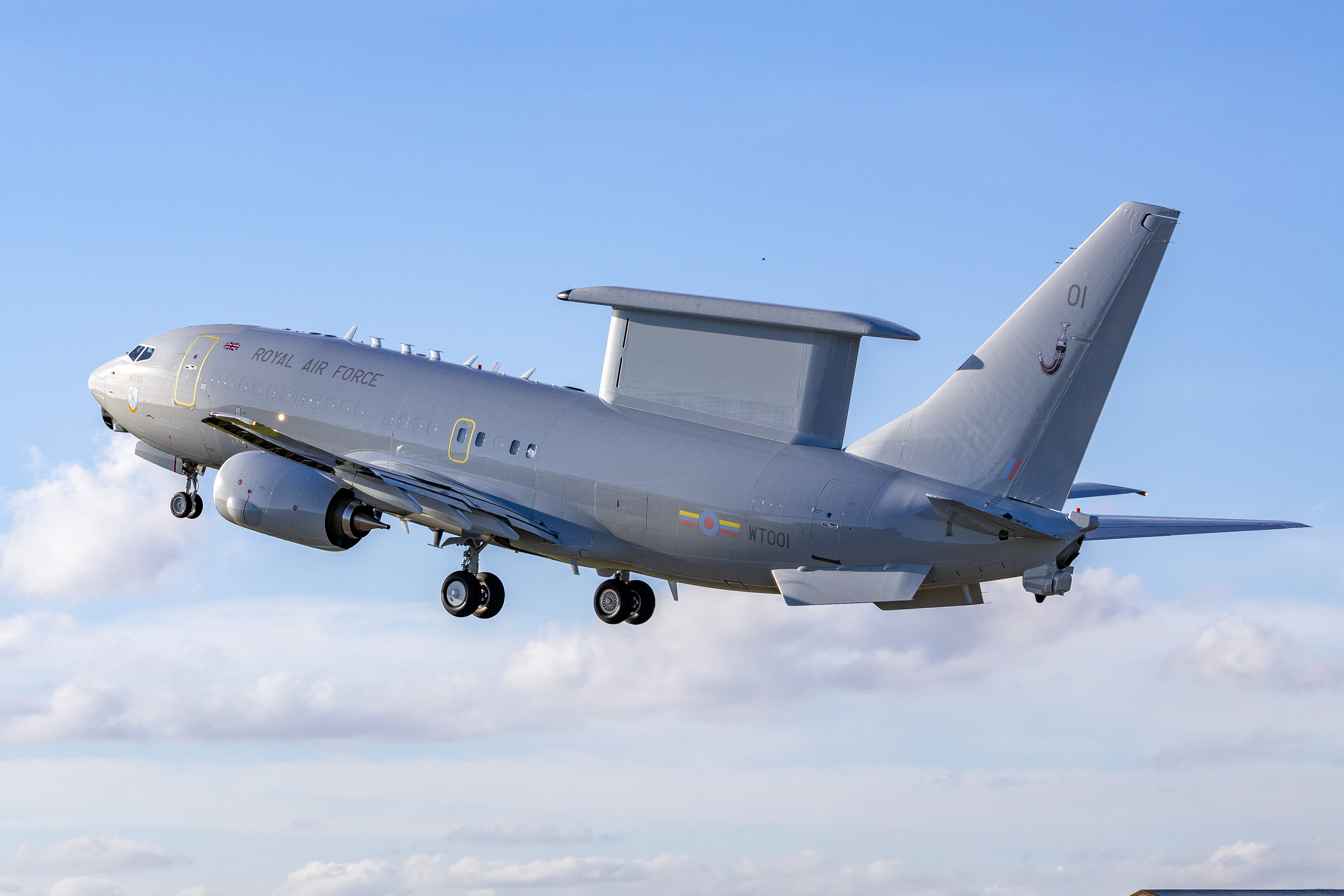
An E-7 Wedgetail in October 2024, which is soon to be operated by No.8 Squadron.

It was announced in July 2019 that from the mid-2020s the squadron will be the first to operate the Boeing E-7 Wedgetail, the planned replacement for the RAF's E-3D Sentry fleet.

On 21 May 2026, the first of three E-7s was delivered to the RAF, with initial operational capability planned for 2026.

== Aircraft operated ==
Aircraft operated include:

- Royal Aircraft Factory BE.2 (1915–1917)
- Armstrong Whitworth F.K.8 (1917–1918)
- Bristol F.2b Fighter (1918–1920)
- Airco DH.9A (1920–1928)
- Fairey IIIF (1928–1935)
- Vickers Vincent (1935–1942)
- Bristol Blenheim Mk.I, Mk.IV and Mk.V (1941–1944)
- Martin Maryland (1940–1941)
- Lockheed Hudson (1943)
- Vickers Wellington Mk.XIII (1943–1945)
- Consolidated Liberator Mk.VI (1945)
- de Havilland Mosquito FB.6 (1946–1947)
- Hawker Tempest F.6 (1947–1950)
- Bristol Brigand (1949–1953)
- de Havilland Vampire FB.9 (1952–1953)
- de Havilland Venom FB.1 and FB.4 (1955–1960)
- Gloster Meteor FR.9 (1958–1961)
- Hawker Hunter FGA.9 and FR.10 (1960–1971)
- Avro Shackleton AEW.2 (1972–1991)
- Boeing E-3 Sentry AEW1 (1991–2021)
- Boeing E-7 Wedgetail AEW Mk1 (2026–present)

== Heritage ==
=== Badge and motto ===
The squadron's badge features a sheathed Arabian dagger known as a jambia, adopted in recognition of the unit's long association with Arabia. The weapon is sheathed to symbolise the squadron's guardian duties. The badge was approved by King George VI in December 1943.

The squadron's motto is Uspiam et passim (Latin for 'Everywhere unbounded'). This reflects the vast areas of wilderness associated with the squadron's operations in Aden during the 1930s and 1940s.

=== Aircraft markings ===
The squadron markings which appear on either side of the RAF roundel are horizontal bars of yellow, blue and red, representing sand, sea and blood.

=== Aircraft names ===
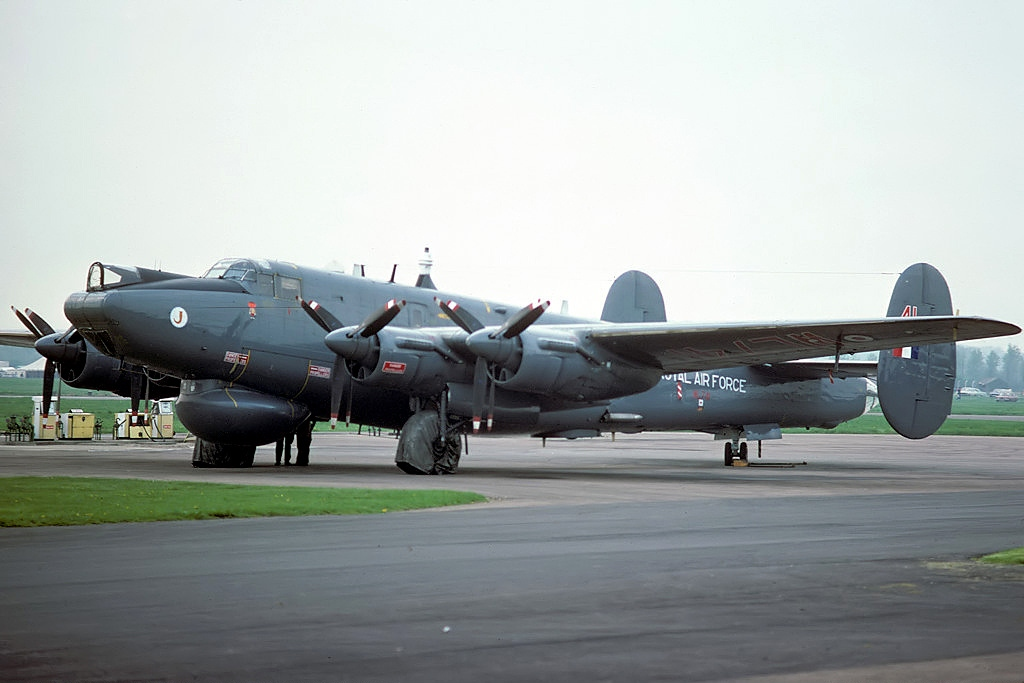
A No. 8 Squadron Avro Shackleton AEW.2 in 1978

The squadron's Avro Shackletons were named after characters from British children's television programmes The Magic Roundabout and The Herbs:

- WL741 – 'PC Knapweed' and 'Basil'
- WL745 – 'Sage'
- WL747 – 'Florence'
- WL754 – 'Paul'
- WL756 – 'Mr Rusty' and 'Snoopy'
- WL757 – 'Brian'
- WL790 – 'Mr McHenry' and 'Zebedee'
- WL793 – 'Ermintrude' and 'Dylan'
- WL795 – 'Rosalie' and 'Zebedee'
- WR960 – 'Dougal'
- WR963 – 'Ermintrude' and 'Parsley'
- WR965 – 'Dill' and 'Rosalie'

The tradition continued when the squadron converted to the E-3D Sentry, with each named after one of the dwarfs from Disney's 1937 animated film Snow White and the Seven Dwarfs.

- ZH101 – 'Doc'
- ZH102 – 'Dopey'
- ZH103 – 'Happy'
- ZH104 – 'Sleepy'
- ZH105 – 'Sneezy'
- ZH106 – 'Grumpy'
- ZH107 – 'Bashful'

== Battle honours ==
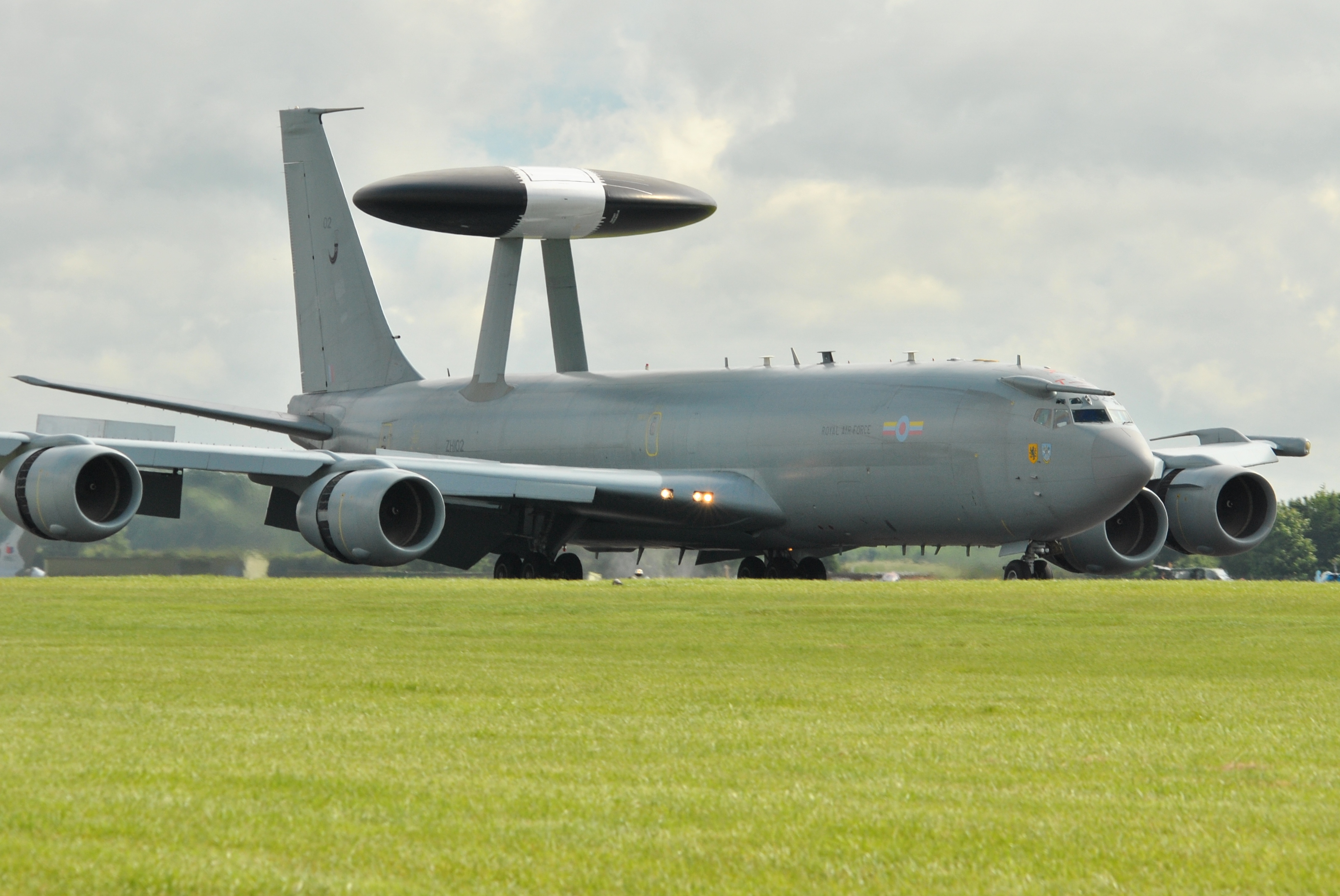
A E-3D Sentry AEW1 of No. 8 Squadron at RAF Waddington, 2012.

No. 8 Squadron has received the following battle honours. Those marked with an asterisk (*) may be emblazoned on the squadron standard.

- Western Front (1915–1918)*
- Loos*
- Somme (1916)*
- Arras*
- Cambrai (1917)*
- Somme (1918)
- Amiens
- Hindenburg Line
- Kurdistan (1922–1924)
- Aden (1928)
- Aden (1929)
- Aden (1934)
- East Africa (1940–1941)*
- Eastern Waters (1942–1945)*
- Burma (1945)*
- Kosovo (1999)
- Afghanistan (2001–2014)
- Iraq (2003)
- Libya (2011)

Along with other units forming the NATO Airborne Earlier Warning Force, No. 8 Squadron was awarded a battle honour by NATO's Supreme Allied Commander Europe for operations during the Kosovo War in the late 1990s. The squadron was the first in the RAF to be formally presented with a second standard in 1967; the first standard gifted in 1954, deteriorated in the climate whilst the squadron was located in Aden.

== See also ==
- List of Royal Air Force aircraft squadrons
- Armed forces in Scotland
- Military history of Scotland
