= Kennedy Trevaskis =

British colonial official and army officer

Sir Gerald Kennedy Nicholas Trevaskis, KCMG, OBE (1 January 1915 – 14 March 1990) was a British colonial official and army officer. He served as High Commissioner of Aden from 1963 to 1965.

Trevaskis saw active service during the Second World War as a soldier and then officer in the Northern Rhodesia Regiment. In August 1940, he was captured by the Italian forces while serving in British Somaliland, becoming a prisoner of war (POW). Having been released in 1941, he spent the rest of the war serving with the British Military Administration of Eritrea.

On 10 December 1963, Trevaskis came under attack from the Yemeni National Liberation Front (NLF). A grenade was thrown at his group at Khormaksar Airport: he was among the wounded and two others were killed. This attack triggered the Aden Emergency.
