= Colin Mitchell =

British Army officer and politician (1925–1996)

- Colin Mitchell c.1967

Member of Parliament for Aberdeenshire West
- In office 18 June 1970 – 8 February 1974
- Preceded by: James Davidson
- Succeeded by: Sir Russell Fairgrieve

Personal details
- Born: 17 November 1925 Croydon, Surrey, England
- Died: 20 July 1996 (aged 70) Westminster, London, England
- Nickname: Mad Mitch

Military service
- Allegiance: United Kingdom
- Branch/service: Home Guard; British Army
- Years of service: 1943–1968
- Rank: Lieutenant Colonel
- Commands: 1st Battalion, Argyll and Sutherland Highlanders
- Battles/wars: World War II; Palestine Emergency; Korean War; Cyprus Emergency; Indonesia–Malaysia confrontation Aden Emergency

Colin Campbell Mitchell (17 November 1925 – 20 July 1996), also known as Mad Mitch, was a British Army soldier and politician. He became a public figure in 1967 as the commanding officer of the 1st Battalion of the Argyll and Sutherland Highlanders. Forces under his command reoccupied the Crater district of Aden which had been taken over by local police mutineers in what became known as "the last battle of the British empire". The reoccupation and subsequent control of the Crater were controversial and Mitchell resigned his army commission in 1968. Subsequently, he became a Conservative Member of Parliament and served one term from 1970 to February 1974. After participation in a failed business venture he subsequently worked as a security and military consultant. In 1989 Mitchell took a leading role in the Halo Trust, a not-for-profit organization undertaking mine clearance in former war zones.

== Early life ==
Mitchell's father (also called Colin) came from an Argyllshire fishing family. Mitchell (Snr) worked in a solicitor's office and for the MacBrayne ferry company before serving in the 10th Battalion Argyll and Sutherland Highlanders in World War I. Mitchell (Snr) achieved the rank of captain (commissioned 'in the field') and was awarded the Military Cross at the Second Battle of Ypres, but when the young Colin asked him how he would only say, 'Oh, shooting rabbits'. He was badly gassed in 1918. After the war, he worked in the City of London and married a Glaswegian woman (née Gilmour) whose father worked as a manager for the LMS Railway company. The couple took up residence in the South London suburb of Purley where they had two children – Colin and Henrietta. The family lived in a modest semi-detached house and Colin would attend services at the local Presbyterian Church wearing a kilt. Mitchell received his formal education at the Whitgift Grammar School in Croydon.

== Military career ==
In 1940, at age 15, Mitchell enlisted in the Home Guard, and may have been the youngest Home Guard soldier. In May 1943 he joined the British Army, enlisting as a private in the Royal West Kent Regiment. He soon became a Lance-Corporal and instructed newcomers in physical training. One of his fellow instructors was Stan Cullis who had been the captain of the Wolverhampton Wanderers cup side at Wembley in 1939 and was the captain of England at the time. Mitchell was commissioned into the Argyll and Sutherland Highlanders in 1944. He fought in the final battles of the Italian campaign, and was lightly wounded in the advance on Ferrara. Despite this, his wartime experience inclined him to take up a military career. He was appointed to a regular commission on 21 December 1946.

Following the war, he saw action against Jewish guerrillas during the Palestine Emergency. While in Palestine, he participated in operations to arrest Jewish militants. During Operation Agatha, which saw most of the Jewish political leadership in Palestine detained, Mitchell's mission was to arrest Moshe Shertok (a future Prime Minister of Israel). Initially, his unit raided the wrong house. However, they were later able to find and arrest him. In July 1946, he witnessed the King David Hotel bombing: he and his company commander were within 300 feet of the building when the bombing occurred. While on a personal reconnaissance mission, he was shot and wounded by one of his own Bren gunners surprised by gunfire and seeing someone moving towards him. After recovering from his injuries, he was transferred from his regiment to become aide-de-camp to General Gordon MacMillan, the commander of British forces in Palestine and Transjordan. He spent a total of three years in Palestine. While there, he made friends among both the Arabs and Jews, including Moshe Dayan, later an Israeli general who became one of Mitchell's heroes. Moshe Shertok, too, developed a cordial relationship with Mitchell after his arrest and corresponded with him for years afterward, when he became a senior Israeli government official.

In 1950, with the outbreak of the Korean War, he was allowed to rejoin his regiment so he could deploy to Korea. He participated in the initial advance into North Korea, seeing close-quarters combat along the way. His regiment ultimately reached Taechon, near the Chinese border on the Yalu River. When the Chinese Army intervened and crossed the Yalu River in overwhelming numbers, the regiment was forced to take part in the retreat of UN forces, and later helped hold the line against Communist forces when UN forces consolidated. The regiment held a position known as "Frostbite Ridge", where they had to endure freezing conditions. They held the area through the winter until the thaw, and in 1951, they began to advance. However, shortly afterward, they were relieved and withdrawn.

Following his service in Korea, Mitchell was posted in Britain, but in late 1957, he returned to the Argylls as a company commander with the 1st Battalion, and was posted to Cyprus. At the time, the Cyprus Emergency was in full swing. Mitchell was placed in charge of the coastal towns of Paphos and Ktima, where his men engaged in counter-insurgency operations against EOKA guerrillas. They faced both conventional EOKA raids and forest fires deliberately lit by EOKA fighters and local villagers who were motivated by the money they would receive to fight them.

Mitchell was subsequently posted to the British Army of the Rhine with the rest of the regiment, and then joined the King's African Rifles, and was posted to East Africa. Soon afterward, he saw action in Zanzibar with the KAR in breaking up disturbances between the island's Arab and African populations, which had begun during a general election and had descended into widespread rioting and clashes. He also participated in operations on the Northern Frontier District. At the time, Somali guerrillas were launching raids as part of a campaign to unite the region with Somalia, and the frontiers with other neighbouring states were also volatile. In one incident, Mitchell was searching for Somali guerrillas in a low-flying helicopter, and an elephant attempted to attack the helicopter, nearly clipping it with its tusks. It has been claimed that while with the KAR Mitchell was instrumental in obtaining a commission for Idi Amin, who later became President of Uganda. Mitchell's familiarity with the Scottish clan system made him more comfortable with African tribal issues than was the case with his English contemporaries. Impressed by Mitchell and other Scottish officers, Amin would later adopt the title King of Scotland.

Following his service in Kenya, Mitchell rejoined the Argylls, which was sent to Borneo to participate in the Indonesian-Malaysian Confrontation. Mitchell participated in a series of clashes with Indonesian forces. After six months of jungle warfare, the regiment was sent back to Singapore to recuperate. Mitchell was posted back to the UK as a staff officer. Throughout all this time Mitchell was making a reputation as a bold and efficient officer, passing out top of Staff College and serving as GSO1 on the staff of Chief of the Defence staff, Lord Mountbatten. Mitchell was promoted lieutenant in 1947, captain in 1952, major in 1959, and his success in a wide range of appointments won him brevet rank as a lieutenant-colonel in 1964.

Mitchell was promoted to substantive lieutenant-colonel on 31 December 1966, and made commanding officer 1st Battalion, The Argyll and Sutherland Highlanders (the 'Argylls') on 12 January 1967.

== Aden ==
In 1967 the British Aden colony consisted of the City of Aden and attached Protectorate areas, with a total land mass similar to that of the United Kingdom. These territories enjoyed a degree of self government as the Federation of South Arabia. Within the City itself was the old quarter known as "The Crater", so called because it was sited in an extinct volcano. The Crater district had an area of approximately one square mile and housed approximately 80,000 people. Between 1963 and 1967 the British administration faced a low intensity insurgency from groups of armed Arab nationalists who were seeking independence for Aden and competing for future power after the British withdrawal. This insurgency was designated the "Aden Emergency".

=== Uprising in Aden City ===
In late June 1967 the 1st Battalion Argyll and Sutherland Highlanders was due to take over responsibility for security in Aden's Crater district from the Royal Northumberland Fusiliers. However, before this took place, on 20 June 1967 elements of the locally recruited Aden Police mutinied, seizing control over the district in alliance with insurgent forces, staging several ambushes of British troops in the Crater district's streets. Eight British soldiers from a transport unit were attacked and killed by the mutineers, and other British troops were killed in coordinated separate attacks. Three men from the Argylls (its Officer Commanding 'D' company, along with two privates) were killed when a patrol of the Royal Northumberland Fusiliers that they were accompanying was ambushed. All but one of the patrol were shot and killed.

For some days a stand-off around the Crater existed between British Forces and the mutineers, with the authorities hesitating. Then, just before sunset on 3 July 1967 Mitchell commanded an operation that reoccupied the Crater. The Argylls and other units entered and reoccupied the Crater, accompanied by 15 bagpipers playing "Scotland the Brave" and the Argylls' regimental charge, "Monymusk". Mitchell subsequently used what were described as "strong arm methods" to maintain order in the Crater district for the remaining months before British withdrawal from Aden. The reoccupation itself was almost bloodless. One local man was killed and control of the Treasury building holding the Federation's currency reserves was restored. Mitchell then used an integrated system of observation posts, patrols, checkpoints and intelligence gathering to maintain the Crater as a pacified area whilst security conditions elsewhere in Aden began to deteriorate. However, British troops in the Crater became subject to sniper and grenade attacks.

Allegations were made of abuses by Mitchell and the troops under his command. There were also allegations that British troops had engaged in some looting within the district. Mitchell used the Chartered Bank building in the Crater district as his headquarters, and army snipers positioned upon its roof would shoot at anyone thought to represent a threat in the streets below. A BBC reporter stated "Once we stood together in Crater watching the Argylls stacking, as in a butcher's shop, the bodies of four Arab militants they had just shot and Mad Mitch said: 'It was like shooting grouse, a brace here and a brace there'." Mitchell (nicknamed 'Mad Mitch' by sections of the press) imposed what was described as "Argyll law" on the Crater.

The reoccupation of the Crater made Mitchell popular with sections of the British press and public. At the same time it brought disapproval from Mitchell's superiors in both the Army and the High Commission. He was criticized for being a publicity-seeker, and there were accusations that the troops under his command lacked discipline. One High Commission official in Aden describing the Argylls as "a bunch of Glasgow thugs" (a statement for which he later apologized). The reoccupation and subsequent control of the Crater district were controversial. General-Officer-Commanding Middle East Land Forces, Major-General Philip Tower, feared that it would merely provoke trouble. He was of the view that engaging in a full reoccupation of the Crater, with its risk of casualties, was pointless given that British withdrawal from Aden was imminent and British strategy was moving to the role of neutral peacekeeping. Tower had authorized a probe into the Crater but Mitchell had used this authority to carry out a full military reoccupation. Tower subsequently ordered Mitchell to "throttle back" on the operation. Mitchell stated that he considered Tower's approach to be "wet hen tactics". The situation that developed was described in The Times as follows:

Mitchell frequently appeared on television: a small, handsome man with a direct, pugnacious manner, speaking the robust, un-minced words that the British had not heard from their army officers since the acceleration of the Imperial decline had begun nearly two decades before. Newspapers took him up as a popular hero, proudly bestowing upon him the sobriquet of 'Mad Mitch'.

Questions were raised in the House of Commons about the events in Aden. Tam Dalyell (Labour, West Lothian) asked whether it was true that: "Mitchell disobeyed operational and administrative orders of his senior officers during the recapture of the Crater"? Mitchell himself later stated that he had been rebuked over the reoccupation by General Tower. The nature of this rebuke was explained by British Government's Defence Minister Denis Healey as follows:

… the brigade commander thought it necessary to emphasize to Colonel Mitchell that the maintenance of law and order with minimum force leading to an orderly withdrawal from Aden with minimum casualties was the policy that had to be followed.

The final British withdrawal from Aden took place in November 1967. Mitchell and the Argylls arrived back at their Plymouth garrison on 27 November. Between July and November the regiment had suffered 5 dead and 25 wounded in Aden, a near 5% casualty rate. Unlike all the other battalion commanders from Aden, Mitchell was not decorated, receiving instead a Mention in Despatches. It was also indicated to him that further career advancement within the army was unlikely. Interviewed by the BBC in 1985, General Tower said "Colonel Mitchell, for reasons of his own, wanted to cut a dash with the Argylls in the Crater" thereby accepting unnecessary casualties. Reports began to circulate to the effect that the Argylls were to be disbanded as part of a general cutback in defence spending. In July 1968, Mitchell gave notice of his intention to resign his commission at the end of the year. Although he had not given the customary 7 months' notice required of senior officers, his resignation was accepted with effect from 1 October 1968.

== Political career ==
Once he was a civilian, Mitchell assumed a prominent public role in a "Save the Argylls" campaign to stop the abolition of the regiment. He published a memoir entitled Having Been a Soldier, undertook some freelance journalism and briefly took a job as management trainee with Beaverbrook Newspapers. However, he had become a popular public figure from his time in Aden, and turned this to his advantage when he started a new career in politics. In 1969 he was adopted as the Conservative Party's parliamentary candidate for Aberdeenshire West. This was a Liberal Party-held seat, although the sitting member was retiring at the next election. Mitchell took the seat with a 5,000 vote majority in the 1970 general election. His main opponent in that election was Laura Grimond, wife of former Liberal leader Jo Grimond.

Mitchell was considered to be an energetic and effective constituency MP. He also served for a year as Parliamentary Private Secretary to the Secretary of State for Scotland. However, it became apparent that he was not likely to develop a ministerial career. His main political interest was the British Army, and he was frequently critical of its leadership. In August 1970 he was quoted as having referred to "... those bastards in Whitehall". He gravitated towards the right wing of the Conservative Party, opposing the United Kingdom's membership of the European Economic Community, economic sanctions being placed upon Rhodesia, and the arms embargo on Israel. He also became a prominent member of both the Monday Club and the 'Anglo-Rhodesian Society'. Mitchell became known as a maverick M.P., and was one of 39 Conservatives who defied the Party whip to vote against entry to the EEC in the Commons vote on 28 October 1971. Although never promoted to ministerial office, Mitchell was a high-profile backbench M.P., in demand by society and the media. He was a popular member of the Garrick Club, and was reported to enjoy a "gregarious social life" in London.

In 1973 he was approached by a consortium that was planning to establish a large sporting and agricultural estate in Scotland, which invited him to take a stake in the project and become the project's General-Manager with a generous salary. Mitchell accepted and announced he would not be seeking re-election to Parliament on the basis that he “…could not afford to be an MP". — a remark that would come back to haunt him. He left Parliament at the time of the February 1974 general election, against the advice of both his wife Sue and fellow maverick M.P Tam Dalyell.

== 1974-1989 ==
The Scottish estate project failed and Mitchell became unemployed. He later stated that giving up his seat in Parliament had been a disastrous mistake. Mitchell spent much of the next 10 years trying to get back into Parliament. He applied to several constituency Conservative Associations, including Bournemouth East in August 1977, but at every selection interview the question was raised as to why he had given up Aberdeenshire West in 1974. No winnable constituency would adopt him. He remained on the fringes of Conservative Party politics, The Times Diary columnist reporting on a meeting of the Monday Club at the 1976 Conservative Party conference where he had made a speech on the subject of Rhodesia:

I went to mock, but came away with much sympathy for Mitchell personally rather than for the lost cause he espouses. He is quite at odds with the world in which he finds himself

During this period Mitchell remained sporadically active in a series of consultancies, mostly of a military or security nature. He is known to have provided services to backers of the Mujahideen insurgents in Afghanistan and Contra rebels in Nicaragua. In November 1980, Mitchell praised the Mujahideen as "gallant fighters... expressing themselves, as Afghans know best, in the romantic tradition of sniping, raiding and brigandry." He urged Western leaders to provide them with military training and equipment, and to select "proven guerrilla fighters" from their ranks for training as future leaders of Afghanistan. However, Mitchell became increasingly dissatisfied with his situation.

At times his disappointment showed and it amounted to bitterness. He turned angrily against the media, which he had used so brilliantly... and against old friends who had tried to help him in difficult times. Once a popular member of the Garrick Club, he avoided it for years, finally stopping his subscription.

== The Halo Trust ==
In 1989, Mitchell co-founded the Halo Trust (the Hazardous Areas Life-support Organization) after a clandestine visit to Afghanistan on a fact-finding mission in the early 1980s. This non-profit making organization undertook de-mining operations in former war zones. It employed a core of (mostly British and Commonwealth) de-mining experts and a large number of locally recruited and trained personnel. Most of the Halo personnel were former servicemen. Halo became active around the world in areas such as Mozambique, Cambodia and Afghanistan.

Mitchell thrived in his work with Halo. It raised his public profile once again, and in a manner that was both positive and uncontroversial. His biographer Aaron Edwards wrote: “As a counterweight to his earlier Mad Mitch persona, or perhaps in spite of it, he shunned the glitz and glamour. In Guy’s [HALO co-founder Willoughby] words, ‘Mitch virtually invented the whole business and he had one rule – no (Press) conferences, no PR razzmatazz. Just action’.”

== Death ==
Mitchell died in his 71st year on 20 July 1996 at Westminster in London, after a short illness. His obituary in The Independent was written by his friend the Labour MP Tam Dalyell. Dalyell stated:

In the course of my last conversation with him in 1995 Mitchell said that in perspective the "Mad Mitch" image had ruined his prospects of a serious senior military career, and had deprived him of being taken seriously as a politician ...

== Personal life ==
Mitchell married Jean Hamilton (Sue) Phillips in April 1956. Phillips was the daughter of Wing Commander Stephen Phillips, R.A.F., and was a native of Meikleour, Perthshire. The couple had three children (2 sons and 1 daughter), the youngest of whom (Colina) was born in 1965. Their son, Dr Angus Mitchell, is a noted authority on the life of Irish revolutionary Roger Casement. One observer later described Phillips as: "his marvellous wife ... who backed him through thick and thin - mostly thin".

After Mitchell’s death in 1996 his son Angus said: “He was always a maverick. In his final years, he chose the dirtiest and most dangerous job left on Earth – clearing up the lethal debris of war. It became an obsession with him.”

== Biography ==
- Mad Mitch’s Tribal Law: Aden & the End of Empire, Aaron Edwards (Mainstream, 2013) ISBN 978-1780577005

Parliament of the United Kingdom
Preceded by James Davidson	Member of Parliament for Aberdeenshire West; 1970–Feb 1974	Succeeded by Russell Fairgrieve
