= Sira Fortress =

Historical fort

Coordinates: 12.780044°N 45.049821°E

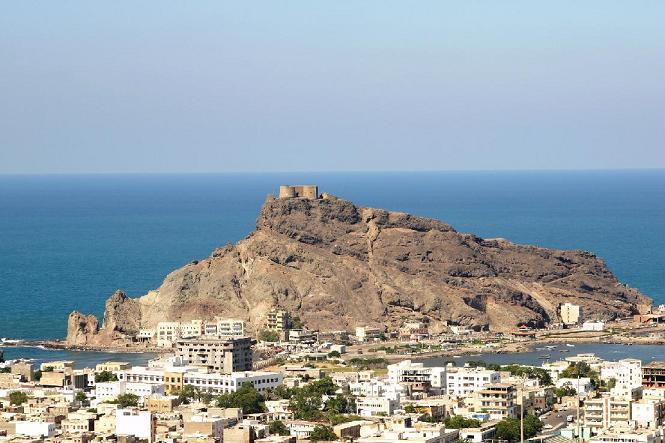
Sira Fortress on the Island of Sira.

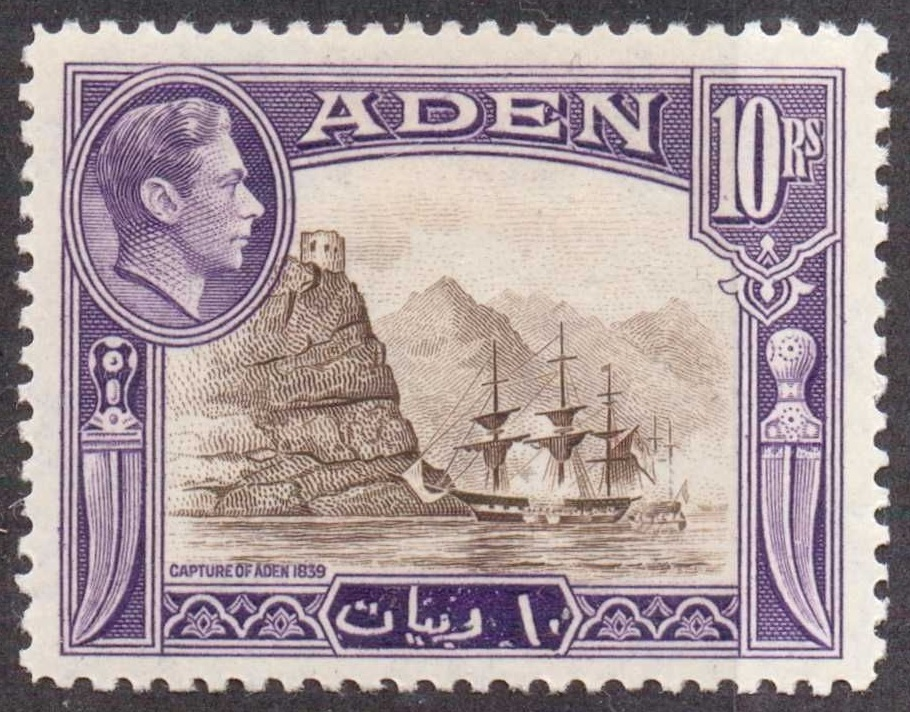
1937 stamp showing the Aden Expedition of 1839. Sira Fortress is visible on the top left.

Sira Fortress/Castle (قلعة صيرة) is a military site in Aden, Yemen. The original fortress dates to the 11th century, and is still in use today by the Yemeni military. The fort is located on Sira Island, a rocky and tall volcanic outcropping which dominates the old harbor of Aden. Although it is referred to as a castle quite often, it is less of a castle and more of a fortification. Much of the fort's history is unknown, especially since there have been few archaeological studies done of the area. One theory is that construction was initiated around the year 1173 by a Turkish ruler of Aden named Prince Othman Al-Zangabili Al-Takriti. The fortress was proven during subsequent attacks against Aden by the Portuguese and especially the Turks in 1517. Although the ancient harbor began to silt up and the primary commercial center eventually moved to the other side of the Aden Peninsula, the British continued to develop and garrison the fortress after their arrival in 1839. It is about a fifteen minute walk up the stairs and can be considered a bit steep. It is one of the most common tourist attractions in the city of Aden.

== See also ==
- Cisterns of Tawila
