= Aden Emergency =

1963–1967 insurgency in South Arabia against British colonial rule

- Part of the Cold War, the Arab Cold War, and the decolonisation of Asia
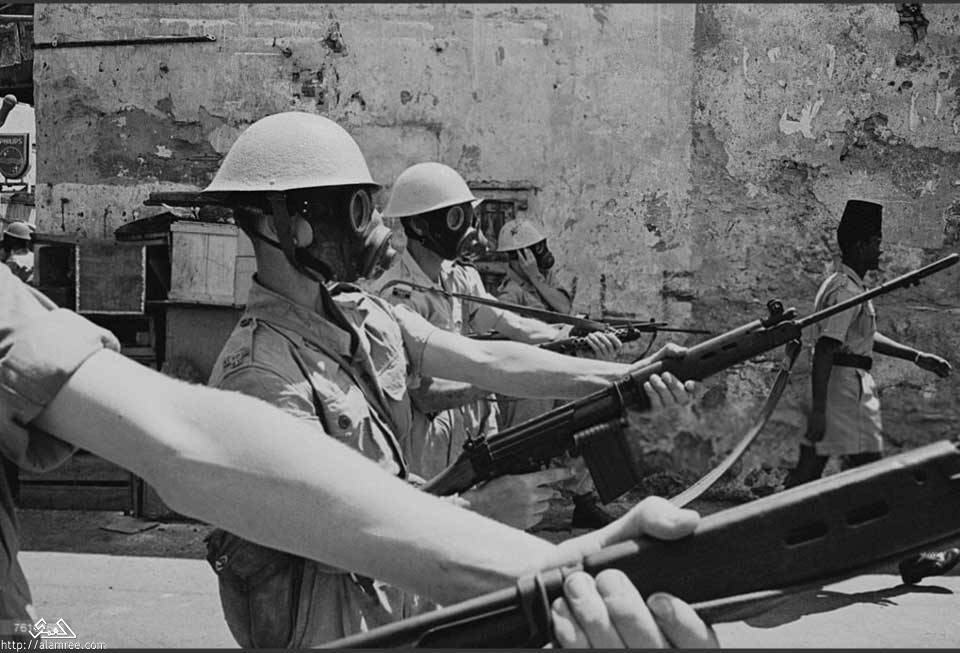
- British soldiers crack down on protests by using tear gas
Date	14 October 1963 – 30 November 1967 (4 years, 1 month, 2 weeks and 2 days)
Location	Western and Eastern Protectorates, Aden Protectorate
Result	Yemeni NLF victory: British withdrawal; Independence of South Yemen

Belligerents
National Liberation Front (NLF) Front for the Liberation of Occupied South Yemen (FLOSY); Supported by: United Arab Republic	United Kingdom Federation of South Arabia: State of Aden; Alawi Sheikhdom; Aqrabi Sheikhdom; Audhali Sultanate; Emirate of Beihan; Dathina Sheikhdom; Emirate of Dhala; Fadhli Sultanate; Haushabi Sultanate; Sultanate of Lahej; Lower Aulaqi Sultanate; Sultanate of Lower Yafa; Muflahi Sheikhdom; Sheikhdom of Shaib; Upper Aulaqi Sheikhdom; Upper Aulaqi Sultanate; Wahidi Sultanate; Protectorate of South Arabia: Mahra Sultanate; Kathiri Sultanate; Qu'aiti Sultanate; Upper Yafa; Sheikhdom of al-Hawra; Sheikhdom of al-`Irqa; South Arabian League; Supported by: Saudi Arabia

Commanders and leaders
(Yemen) Qahtan al-Shaabi (Yemen) Jarallah Omar (Yemen) Salim Rubaya Ali (Yemen) Rajih Labouza † (Yemen) Ali Antar Abdullah al-Asnag	(United Kingdom) Harold Wilson (United Kingdom) Michael Le Fanu (United Kingdom) Michael Beetham (United Kingdom) Colin Campbell Mitchell

Units involved
unknown	See British Order of Battle at the Aden Emergency

Strength
(Yemen) 26,000 fighters	(United Kingdom) 30,000 at peak (3,500 in November 1967); 15,000 federal troops

Casualties and losses
(Yemen) 382 killed (Yemen) 1,714 wounded	British Army: (United Kingdom) 90–92 killed (United Kingdom) 510 wounded Federal Regular Army: 17 killed 58 wounded
- Total: 2,096 casualties

The Aden Emergency, also known as the 14 October Revolution (Note: Arabic: ثورة 14 أكتوبر, romanised: Thawrat 14 ʾUktūbar, lit. '14th October Revolution') or the Aden Insurgency, was an armed rebellion led mainly by the National Liberation Front (NLF) and the Front for the Liberation of Occupied South Yemen (FLOSY) against the British Protectorate and Federation of South Arabia. It began on 14 October 1963 when tribes from Radfan attacked British troops and ended with the proclamation of independence of the People's Republic of Southern Yemen.

The British had declared a state of emergency following the throwing of a grenade at a gathering of British officials on 10 December 1963 at RAF Khormaksar. A state of emergency was then declared in the British Crown colony of Aden and its hinterland, the Aden Protectorate. The emergency escalated in 1967, which hastened the end of British rule in the territory, which had begun in 1839.

== Background ==
=== British arrival in Yemen ===
The first political intercourse between Yemen and the British took place in 1799 during the French invasion of Egypt and Syria, when a naval force was sent from Britain, with a detachment of troops from India, to occupy the island of Perim and prevent all communication of the French in Egypt with the Indian Ocean, by way of the Red Sea. Due to the lack of water supply, the barren and inhospitable island of Perim was found unsuitable for troops. The Sultan of Lahej, Ahmed bin Abdul Karim, then received the detachment for some time at Aden. He proposed to enter into an alliance and to grant Aden as a permanent station, but the offer was declined. A treaty was, however, concluded with the Sultan in 1802 by Admiral Home Popham, who was instructed to enter into political and commercial alliances with the Chiefs of the Arabian coast of the Red Sea.

By the early 1800s, the British were looking for a coaling station to fuel their steamships through their journey from the Suez Canal to the British Raj. The British tried to negotiate with the Mahra Sultanate to buy the island of Socotra, located in the Arabian Sea, but the Sultan of Mahra refused and told the British naval officer who was tasked with the mission that the island was "the gift of the Almighty to the Mahris". In 1835, a year after the British had given up on Socotra, they had attempted to purchase the port city of Aden and its inlet from the Sultan of Lahej, Muhsin Bin Fadl, but they failed. In 1837, the Duria Dawla, an Indian ship flying the Union Jack, crashed near the east coast of Aden and was looted by local tribesmen. A year after the incident, in 1838, British officials arrived in Lahej and demanded 12,000 Maria Theresa thalers (MTT) as compensation for the losses. The sultan, unable to pay that sum of money, was forced to cede Aden to the British for a sum of 8,700 MTT a year. On 19 January 1839, the British East India Company landed Royal Marines at Aden to retain full control of Aden and stop attacks by pirates against British shipping to India.

After the landing in Aden, the British established informal treaties of protection with nine sheikhdoms and sultanates in the surrounding region. This was more a precautionary measure to prevent the Imams of Yemen from storming Aden, which was something the sheikhdoms did not want to happen. Those agreements allowed the British to maintain control to assert their influence by using the existing tribal structures. Since the region was plagued by frequent tribal conflicts and no single ruler held enough sway to unify the tribes, there was little threat to British dominance. The fragmentation not only prevented any strong opposition but also delayed the formation of a broader national identity. The British, in turn, benefited from a system that was both efficient and inexpensive by spending only around $5,435 a year in subsidies to secure the loyalty of 25 sultans. By avoiding direct administration and relying on a policy of strategic dependence, the British expanded their influence. By 1914, they had treaties with nearly every sultan in the region.

=== Partitioning Yemen ===
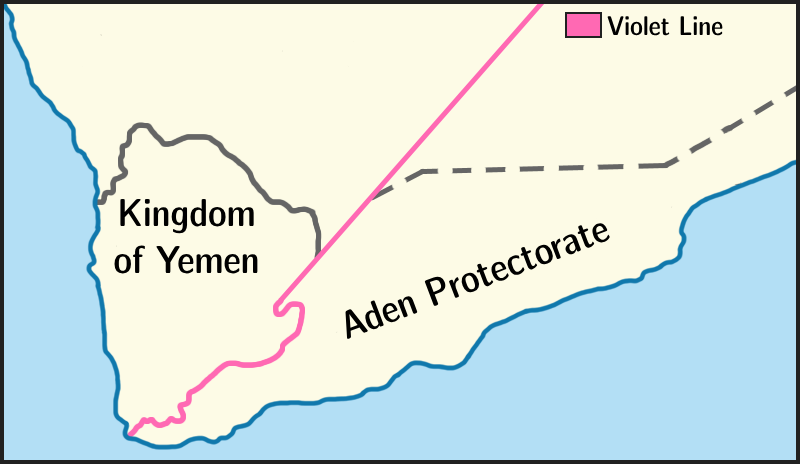
Map showing the Violet Line

In 1914, following the Anglo-Ottoman Convention of 1913, the British and the Ottomans divided Arabia into two parts: the northwest under Ottoman control and influence and the southeast under British control and influence. Although a further agreement, which came to be later known as the Violet Line, was negotiated, the Ottomans planned an invasion of the Aden Protectorate in cooperation with local tribes. They had gathered significant strength at the Cheikh Said peninsula. On 5 November 1914, during the First World War, the British declared war on the Ottomans, who responded with their declaration a few days later, on 11 November. Although the Ottomans managed to capture the Sultanate of Lahej and reach the city of Aden, they were later expelled by the British. Around the same time, the British-sponsored Arab Revolt in the Hejaz broke out, which diverted Ottoman attention from Aden and effectively ending the campaign. The Armistice of Mudros, signed in 1918, officially concluded the war and forced the Ottomans out of Arabia, which led to the establishment of the Kingdom of Yemen.

During the period between the World Wars, Aden grew significantly in strategic value to the British. Positioned near the entrance to the Persian Gulf, it played a crucial role in safeguarding maritime routes through the Suez Canal and was close to the newly discovered oil reserves in the Arabian Peninsula. Recognising its increased importance, Britain formally designated Aden as a Crown Colony in 1937 and implemented a full colonial administrative system. The move further diminished the authority of local rulers, as Britain took full control over governance and policy decisions. The centralisation of power in British hands sparked several small-scale uprisings. In response, Yemeni leaders, often supported by British forces, resorted to harsh and repressive tactics to suppress dissent and maintain order among the tribes.

=== Beginning of end of British rule in Yemen ===
In 1952, Arab nationalism began to sweep across the Arab world, starting in Egypt, accompanied by anti-colonial sentiments. Nationalist pressures prompted the rulers of the Aden Protectorate states to renew efforts at forming a federation. On 11 February 1959, six of those states signed an accord to form the Federation of the Emirates of South Arabia. Over the next three years, nine additional sheikhdoms joined, and on 18 January 1963, Aden Colony was merged with the federation, creating the new Federation of South Arabia (FSA), although all but four sheikhdoms out of twenty-one had joined the union. Meanwhile, the Qu'aiti and Kathiri sultanates of Hadhramaut, along with Mahra, and Upper Yafa refused to join either federation and became the Protectorate of South Arabia, marking the end of the Aden Protectorate. The FSA did not succeed for several reasons, the first of which was the British insistence that the State of Aden would be part of the entity, which was rejected by the commercial elite of Aden, most of which was Indians, Persians and Jews, because it feared that Aden's wealth would be taken away by the neighbouring sheikhdoms. On the other hand, the leaders of the sheikhdoms had little experience with federal rule and had no desire for cooperation. In addition, there were differences between the sheikhdoms over who should head the federation's new government.

In 26 September 1962, a successful coup carried out against the Kingdom of Yemen by the Free Officers Movement in Yemen, supported by Egyptian President Gamal Abdel Nasser, who had led the Egyptian Revolution of 1952 against British rule, resulted in the establishment of the Yemen Arab Republic. This coup inspired organisations, such as the local branch of the Movement of Arab Nationalists and the Aden Trade Union Congress, to form the National Liberation Front (NLF) (Note: led by Qahtan al-Shaabi) and the Front for the Liberation of Occupied South Yemen (FLOSY), (Note: led by Abdullah al-Asnag) respectively. Supporters of the NLF were from the countryside of Radfan, Yafa', and Ad-Dali, while the supporters of the FLOSY were mainly the citizens of Aden because tribal affiliations played a major role in attracting supporters.

=== Involved organisations ===
There were a number of different nationalist groups fighting the British, which often fought one another. The most well-known groups are:

1. The National Liberation Front (NLF)
2. The Front for the Liberation of South Yemen (FLOSY)
3. The South Arabian League (SAL)
4. The Organization for the Liberation of the Occupied South (OLOS)
5. The People's Socialist Party (PLP)

Among the main players, the SAL was backed by Saudi Arabia, the FLOSY by Egypt and the Aden Trade Unions. All of the major groups were based in Yemen, and they regularly combined and split with other groups. For instance, SAL joined with PSP to become OLOS in 1965, and then broke away in 1966. The NLF joined with OLOS in January 1966 to form FLOSY but broke away in December 1966. Such movements were quite common throughout the war.

== History ==
=== Grenade attack and British declaration of state of emergency ===
The British declared a state of emergency on 10 December 1963, following an NLF grenade attack on the British High Commissioner of Aden, Sir Kennedy Trevaskis, which took place as he arrived at Khormaksar Airport to catch a London-bound flight. The grenade killed the High Commissioner's adviser and a woman and injured fifty other people.

NLF and FLOSY began a campaign against British forces in Aden that relied largely on grenade attacks. One such attack was carried out against RAF Khormaksar during a children's party, killing a girl and wounding four children.

The guerrilla attacks largely focused on killing off-duty British officers and policemen. Much of the violence was carried out in Crater, the old Arab quarter of Aden. British forces attempted to intercept weapons being smuggled into Crater by the NLF and FLOSY on the Dhala road, but their efforts met with little success. Despite taking a toll on British forces, the death toll among rebels was far higher, largely because of interfactional fighting among different rebel groups.

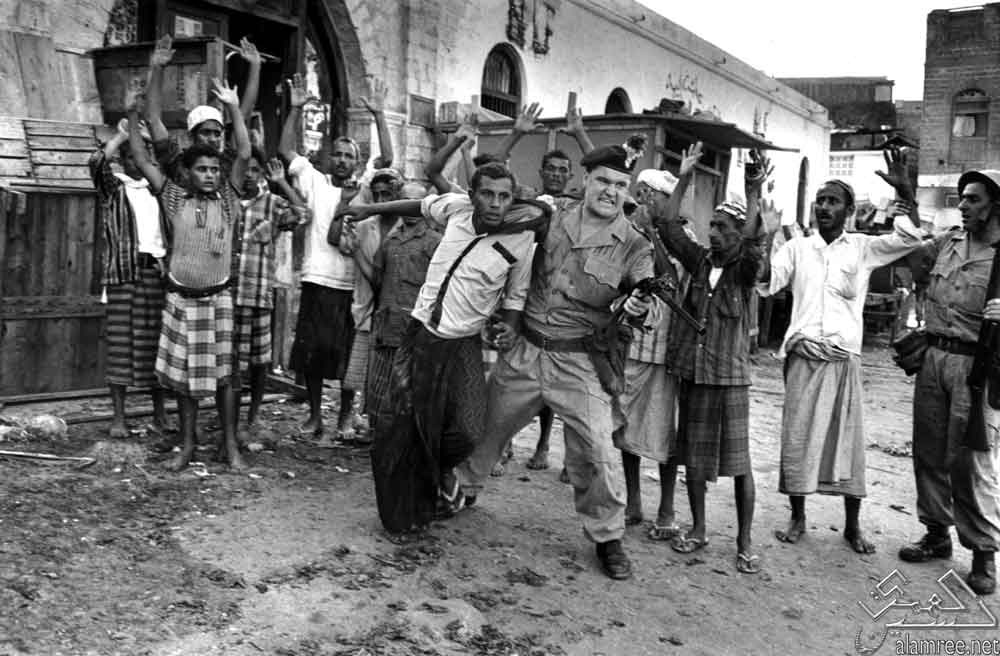
Aden in 1965

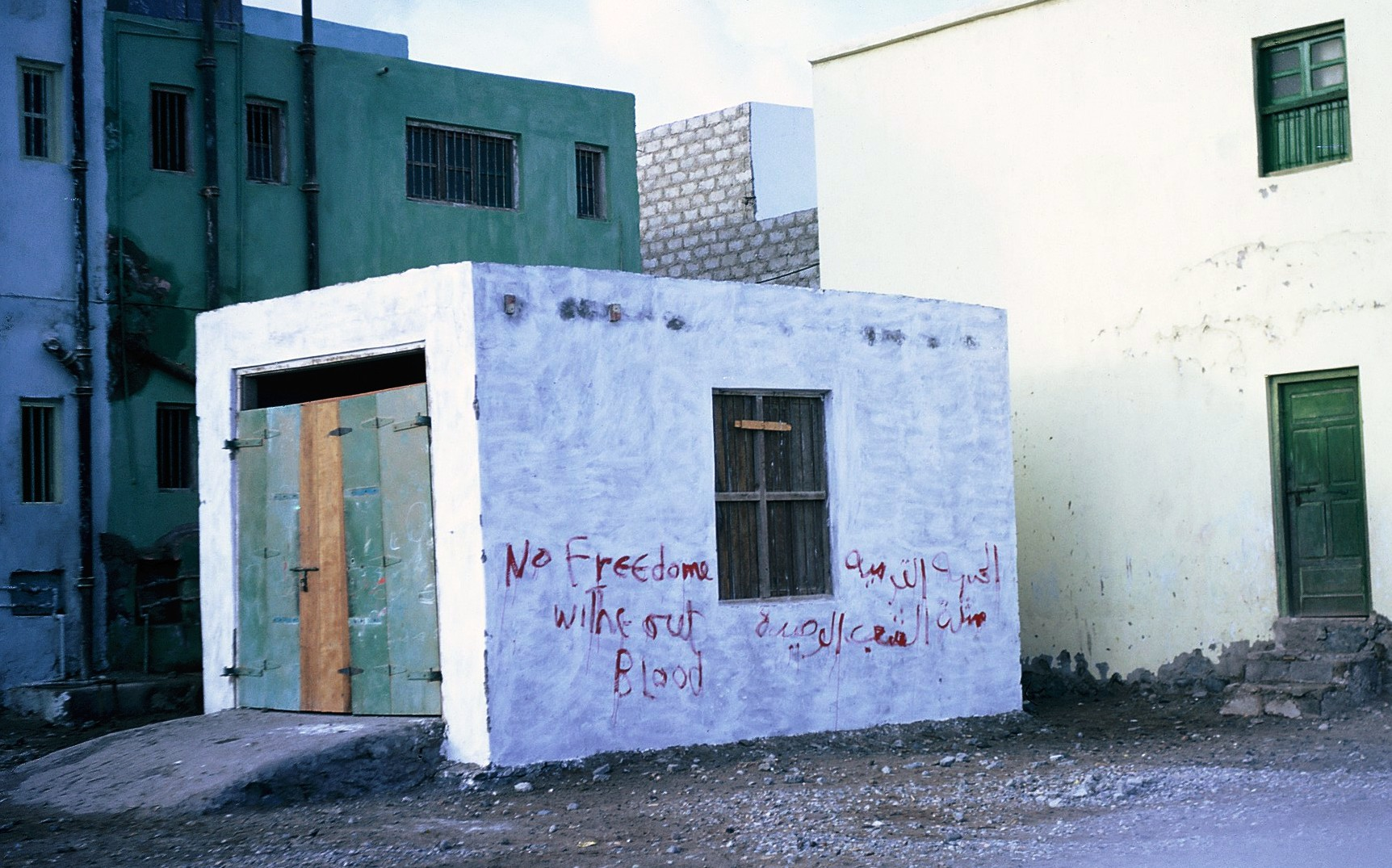
NLF graffiti in Mansoura, 1966: "No freedom without blood"

By 1965, the RAF station RAF Khormaksar was operating nine squadrons, including transport units with helicopters and several Hawker Hunter fighter-bomber aircraft. The army called in these for attacks on rebel positions in which they would use 60-pound high explosive rockets and their 30 mm ADEN cannon.

=== Aden street riots ===
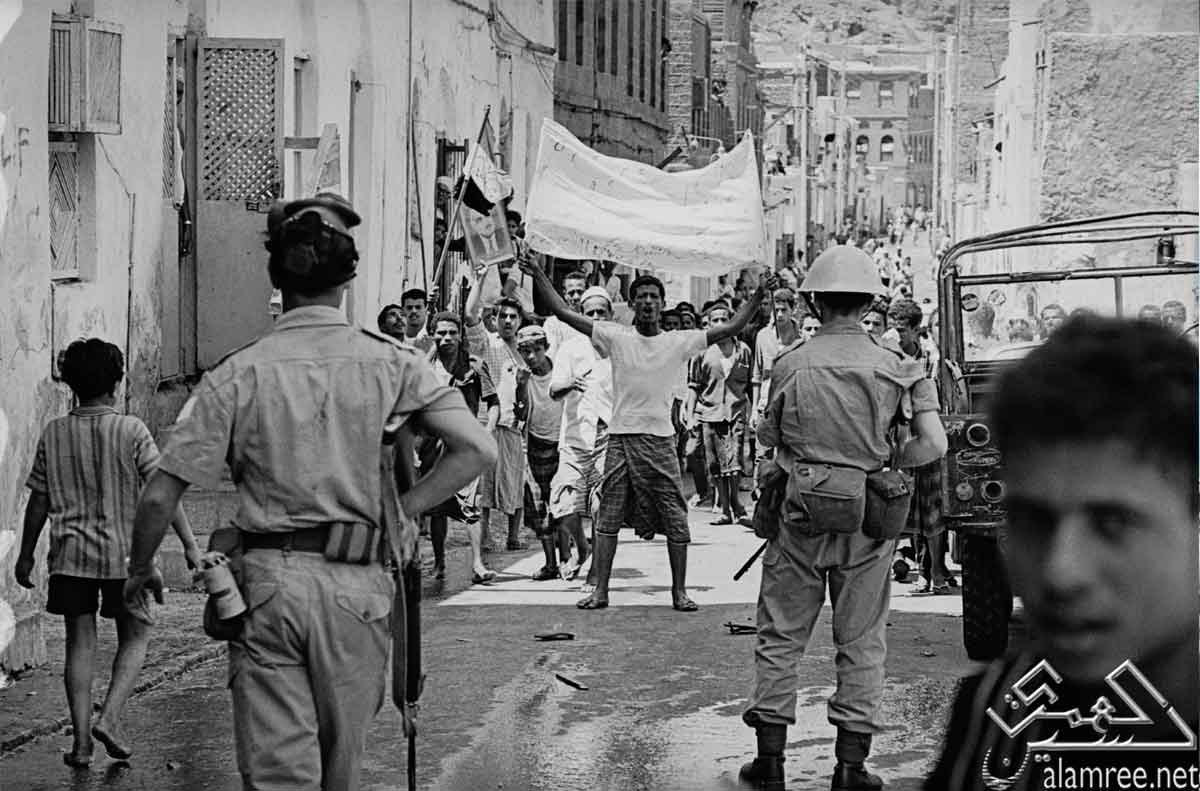
Street riots in Aden, 1967

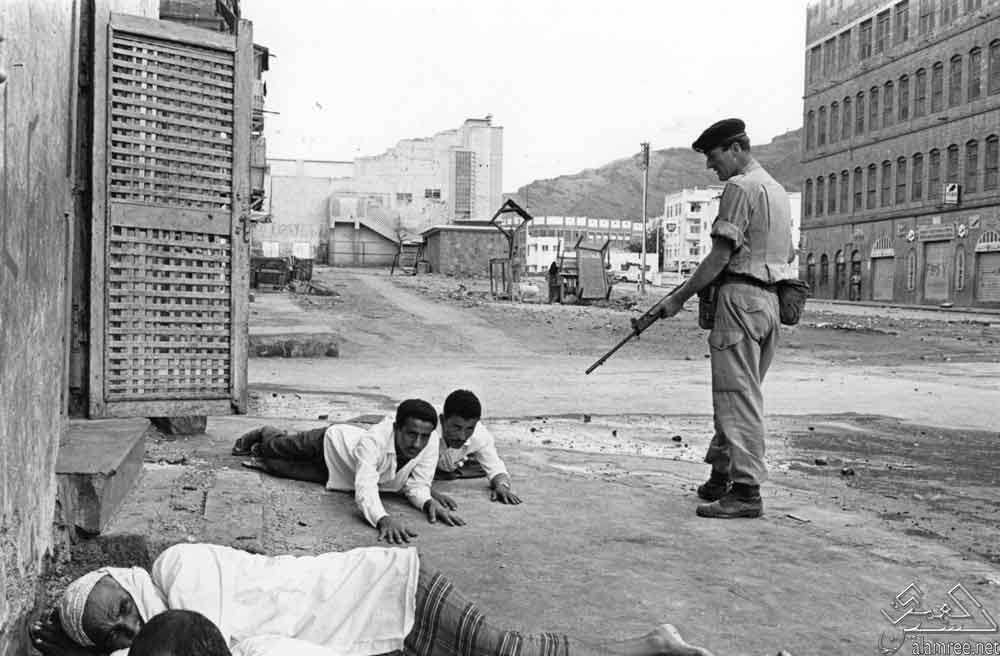
Aden in 1967

On 19–20 January 1967, the NLF provoked street riots in Aden. After the Aden police lost control, British High Commissioner Sir Richard Turnbull deployed British troops to crush the riots. As soon as the NLF riots were crushed, pro-FLOSY rioters took to the streets. Fighting between British forces and pro-guerrilla rioters lasted into February. British forces opened fire 40 times, and during that period there were 60 grenade and shooting attacks against British forces, including the destruction of an Aden Airways Douglas DC-3, which was bombed in mid-air, killing all the people on board.

At one point, toward the end of the rebellion in early 1967 the NLF killed at least 35 members of FLOSY in 32 days. The FLOSY guerrillas first asked the British for protection, and then 80 actually flew to the UK using the British passports they had as citizens of a British Colony.

=== Arab police mutiny ===
The emergency was further exacerbated by the Six-Day War in June 1967. Egyptian President Gamal Abdel Nasser claimed that the British had helped Israel in the war, which led to a mutiny by hundreds of soldiers in the South Arabian Federation Army on June 20 that spread to the Aden Armed Police. The mutineers killed 22 British soldiers and shot down a helicopter. The pilot had to abandon a takeoff from a ledge near Crater after being hit in the knee by a bullet. The Sioux helicopter crashed and burned out, but all three occupants escaped. As a result, Crater was occupied by rebel forces.

Concerns were heightened regarding the ability to give sufficient security to British families in the midst of the increased violence, resulting in evacuation plans for families being sped up considerably.

=== Battle of Crater ===
Following the mutiny, all British forces were withdrawn from Crater, and Royal Marines of 45 Commando took up sniping positions on the high ground and killed 10 armed Arab fighters. However, Crater remained occupied by an estimated 400 Arab fighters. NLF and FLOSY fighters then took to the streets and engaged in gun battles, and arson, looting and murder were also common. British forces blocked off the two main entrances to Crater. They came under sniper fire from an Ottoman fort on Sira Island, but the snipers were silenced by a shell from an armoured car. Order was restored in July 1967, when the 1st Argyll and Sutherland Highlanders entered Crater under the command of Lt. Col. Colin Campbell Mitchell and managed to occupy the entire district overnight with no casualties.

=== British withdrawal from Yemen ===
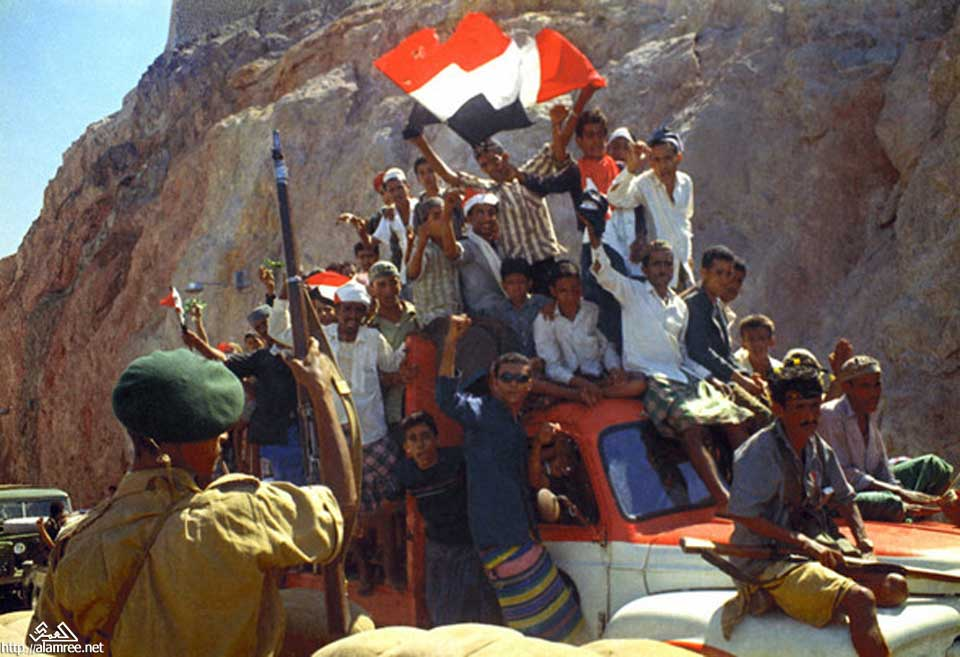
NLF supporters waving their flags as part of the celebrations and mass marches on 29 and 30 November, 1967

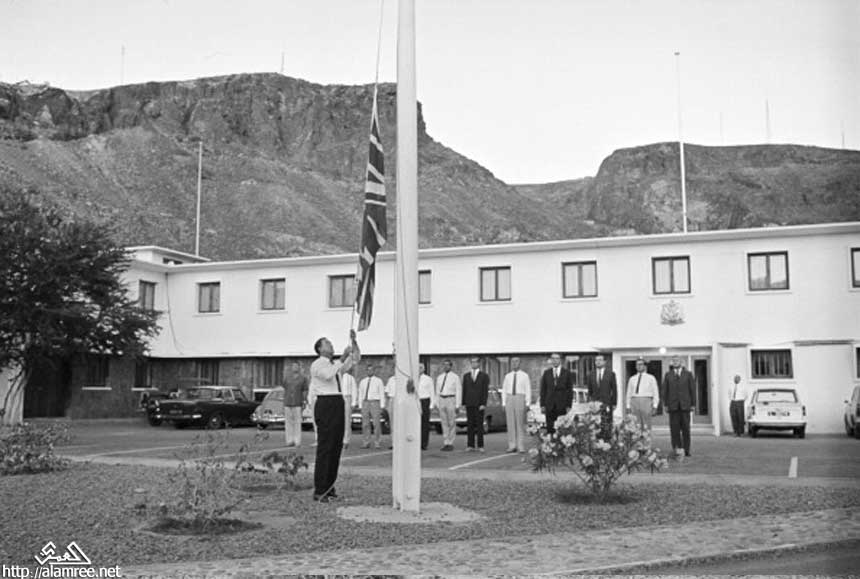
Lowering of the Union Flag in Aden

Nevertheless, repeated guerrilla attacks by the NLF soon resumed against British forces, causing the British to leave Aden by the end of November 1967, earlier than had been planned by British Prime Minister Harold Wilson and without an agreement on the succeeding governance. That effectively abandoned the South Arabian government.

On 30 November 1967, the Federation of South Arabia ceased to exist when the People's Republic of Southern Yemen was proclaimed. In 1967, Israel defeated Egypt in the Six-Day War, thus obliging Egypt to evacuate its troops from Yemen. FLOSY, now without any military support from its Egyptian ally, continued fighting the NLF. However, FLOSY's fate was sealed when the NLF managed to persuade the Yemen Federal Army to join the fight. On 7 November 1967, FLOSY tried to attack a federal army base, but the army defeated FLOSY with the NLF's help, inflicting heavy losses on FLOSY. After the defeat, FLOSY's fighting force disbanded although some cadres and leaders remained outside the country. Most of the opposing leaders reconciled by 1968, in the aftermath of a final royalist siege of San'a'.

== Aftermath ==
British military casualties from 1963 to 1967 were 90 to 92 killed and 510 wounded. British civilian deaths were 17. Local government forces lost 17 killed and 58 wounded. Casualties among the rebel forces stood at 382 killed and 1,714 wounded.

== See also ==
- Corrective Move – 1969 Marxist internal coup in South Yemen
- List of modern conflicts in the Middle East – List of Middle Eastern conflicts since 1914
