= RAF Khormaksar =

Former airport in Yemen

RAF Khormaksar
- Aden, Aden Protectorate in Yemen
- Motto: Into the Remote Places

Site information
- Type: Royal Air Force station
- Owner: Ministry of Defence
- Operator: Royal Air Force
- Controlled by: British Forces Aden

Location
- Shown within Yemen
- Coordinates: 12°49′46″N 045°01′45″E

Site history
- Built: 1917
- In use: 1917 – 29 November 1967
- Battles/wars: Aden Emergency

Airfield information
- Identifiers: IATA: ADE, ICAO: OYAA
- Elevation: 1 metre (3 ft 3 in) AMSL
Runways
Direction	Length and surface
08/26	Asphalt

Royal Air Force Khormaksar, or RAF Khormaksar, is a former Royal Air Force station in Aden, Yemen. Its motto was "Into the Remote Places". During the 1960s, it was the base for nine squadrons and became the RAF's busiest-ever station as well as the biggest staging post for the RAF between the United Kingdom and Singapore.

It later became Aden International Airport.

== History ==
Established in 1917, RAF Khormaksar was enlarged in 1945. No. 8 Squadron RAF arrived in 1927, and stayed until 1945, operating the Fairey IIIF, Vickers Vincent, Hawker Demon, Martin Maryland, Fairey Swordfish, and the Lockheed Hudson.

On 10 June 1940, Italy declared war on Britain and France, and Aden quickly became an important British base for the East African Campaign. Khormaksar launched its first combat sorties three days later, when 8 Squadron sent nine Bristol Blenheims to bomb an airfield at Assab in Italian Eritrea, across the Red Sea from Aden on 12 June. Five Vincents attacking the same airfield that night. On 5 August 1940, Italy invaded British Somaliland, and 8 Squadron's Blenheims flew missions against advancing Italian troop columns. The Italians heavily outnumbered the British and Commonwealth defences, and the port of Berbera, immediately south of Aden across the Gulf of Aden, was occupied by the Italians on 19 August.

After December 1941, the station became a stopover and refueling point for the USAAF Air Transport Command. 8 Squadron continued to be based at Khormaksar equipped with Blenheims. The squadron flew Vickers Wellington XIIIs were flown from December 1943 until May 1945.

In September 1944, No.1566 Meteorological Flight was relocated to Khormaksar from Hiswa. The unit consisted of 4 Hurricane Mark IIBs and 10 support crew. Spitfires were later used. The flight operated until 1946.

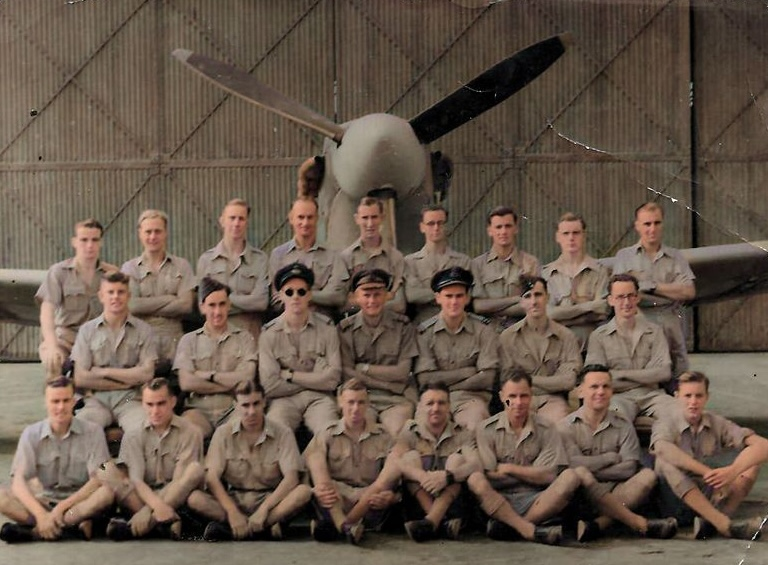
Flight 1566 Meteorological Flight support crew circa 1945

In 1943 a Communication Squadron, HQ British Forces Aden Communication Squadron, was established here. It changed names twice in 1951 and 1955 before being disbanded in 1956.

In 1958, a state of emergency was declared in Aden as Yemeni forces occupied nearby Jebel Jehaf and RAF squadrons were involved in action in support of the British Army. In the 1960s, during operations around Rhadfan, the station reached a peak of activity, becoming overcrowded and attracting ground attacks by rebels. In 1966, the newly elected Labour government in the United Kingdom announced that all forces would be withdrawn by 1968.

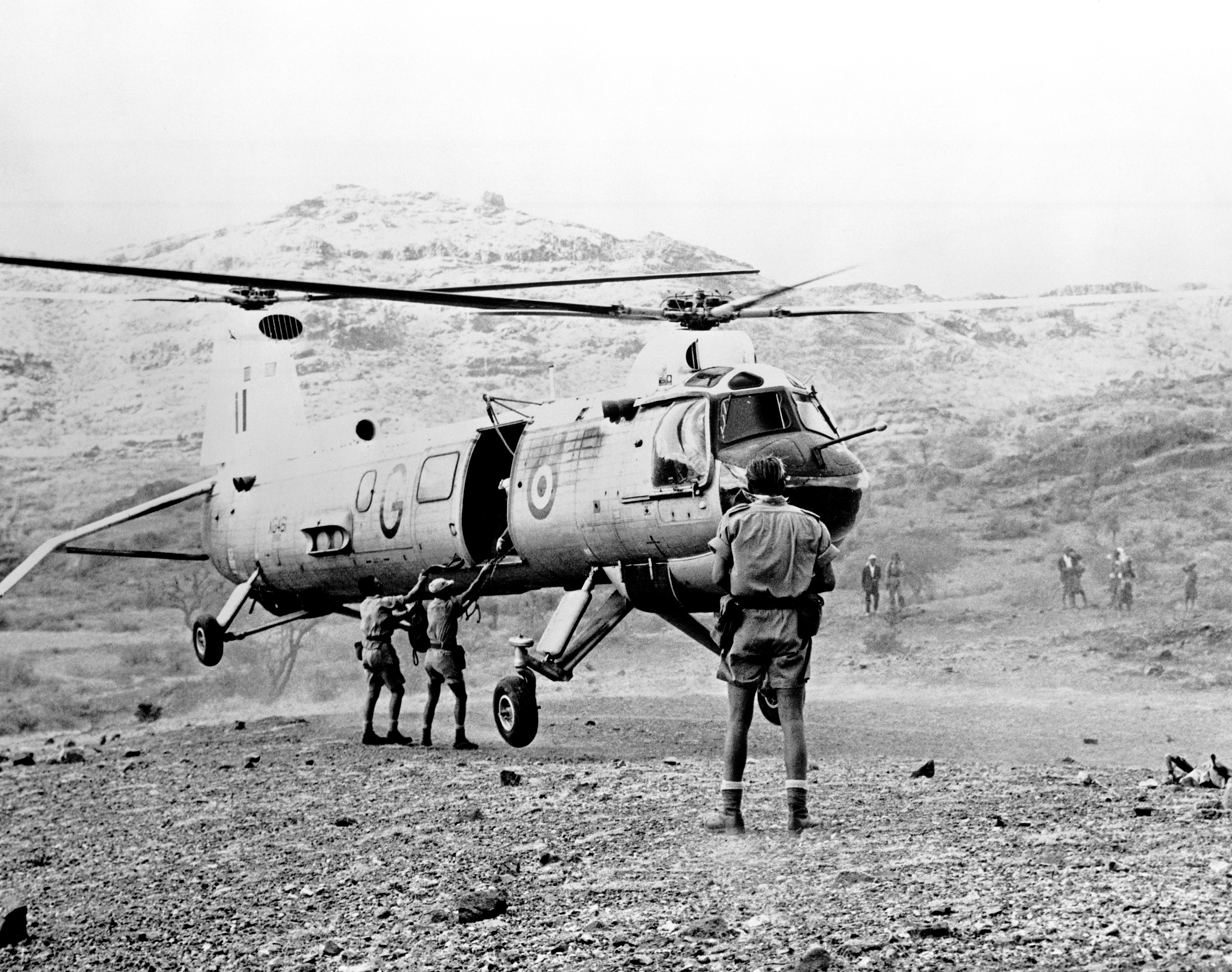
Belvedere HC.1 of 26 Squadron based at Khormaksar c. 1964

In May 1967, it was expected that planned final force levels at Khormaksar ahead of the January 1968 withdrawal would be:

*The Army element, comprising Tactical Headquarters Aden Brigade, one commando, one battalion, one armoured car troop, one light artillery troop, one engineer troop and elements of the small Joint Headquarters. Total of some 1,150 personnel.

*The RAF element, comprising a squadron of Hunters and a Wessex flight (both with servicing support parties), a visiting aircraft servicing party, the Communications Centre, elements of an ATOC, movements, airfield services and elements of the Joint Headquarters. Total of some 350 personnel.

Khormaksar played a role in the evacuation of British families from Aden in the summer of 1967. The station closed on 29 November 1967.

== Units and aircraft ==
Inter war years and Second World War

Unit	Dates	Aircraft	Variant	Notes
No. 8 Squadron RAF	27 February 1927 - 1 May 1945	Fairey III Vickers Vincent Hawker Demon Bristol Blenheim Martin Maryland Fairey Swordfish Lockheed Hudson Vickers Wellington	F. I I I I VI XIII	Disbanded
No. 12 Squadron RAF	20 October 1935 - 25 November 1935 23 March 1936 - 18 May 1936 28 July 1936 - 11 August 1936	Hawker Hart	I	Moved to RAF Robat Moved to RAF Robat Moved to RAF Andover
No. 41 Squadron RAF	20 October 1935 - 18 March 1936	Hawker Demon	I	Moved to RAF Sheikh Othman
No. 94 Squadron RAF	26 March 1939 - 2 May 1939	Gloster Gladiator	I & II	Moved to RAF Sheikh Othman
No. 114 Squadron RAF	23 September 1945 - 1 May 1946	Douglas Boston de Havilland Mosquito	V VI	Reduced to a Cadre
No. 203 Squadron RAF	18 May 1940 - 16 April 1941	Bristol Blenheim	IV	Moved to RAF Kabrit
No. 216 Squadron RAF	27 November 1942 - 15 July 1945	Lockheed Hudson Douglas Dakota	VI I	Detached from RAF Cairo West
No. 244 Squadron RAF	17 March 1944 - 1 May 1945	Vickers Wellington	XIII	Detached from RAF Masirah
No. 259 Squadron RAF	14 September 1943 - 1 May 1945	Consolidated Catalina	IB	Detached from RAF Dar es Salaam
No. 265 Squadron RAF	1 April 1943 - 1 May 1945	Consolidated Catalina	IB	Detached from RAF Diego Suarez
No. 459 Squadron RAAF	1 July 1942 - 5 April 1944	Lockheed Hudson	III	Detached from LG227 and LG143
No. 621 Squadron RAF	5 December 1943 - 12 November 1945	Vickers Wellington	XIII & XIV	Moved to RAF Mersah Matruh

Cold War

Unit	Dates	Aircraft	Variant	Notes
No. 8 Squadron RAF	1 September 1946 - 14 August 1950	de Havilland Mosquito Hawker Tempest Bristol Brigand Avro Anson Auster	FB.6 F.6 B.1 C.19 AOP.6	Moved to RAF Nicosia
No. 8 Squadron RAF	25 September 1950 - 31 May 1951	Bristol Brigand Avro Anson Auster	B.1 C.19 AOP.6	Moved to RAF Shaibah
No. 8 Squadron RAF	8 September 1951 - 23 February 1952	Bristol Brigand Avro Anson Auster	B.1 C.19 AOP.6	Moved to RAF Nicosia
No. 8 Squadron RAF	9 April 1952 - 7 July 1953	Bristol Brigand de Havilland Vampire	B.1 FB.9	Moved to RAF Nicosia
No. 8 Squadron RAF	23 November 1953 - 24 July 1956	de Havilland Vampire de Havilland Venom	FB.9 FB.1 & FB.4	Moved to RAF Habbaniyah
No. 8 Squadron RAF	20 December 1956 - 30 June 1961	de Havilland Venom Gloster Meteor Hawker Hunter	FB.1 & FB.4 FR.9 FGA.9 & FR.10	Moved to RAF Bahrain
No. 8 Squadron RAF	14 October 1961 - 8 August 1967	Hawker Hunter	FGA.9 & FR.10	Moved to RAF Masirah
No. 21 Squadron RAF	1 June 1965 – 9 September 1967	Scottish Aviation Twin Pioneer Douglas Dakota Hawker Siddeley Andover	CC.1 I CC.2	Disbanded
No. 26 Squadron RAF	1 March 1963 – 30 November 1965	Bristol Belvedere	HC.1	Disbanded
No. 37 Squadron RAF	21 August 1957 – 7 September 1967	Avro Shackleton	MR.2	Disbanded
No. 43 Squadron RAF	1 March 1963 – 7 November 1967	Hawker Hunter	FGA.9	Disbanded
No. 73 Squadron RAF	30 July - 21 December 1956	de Havilland Venom	FB.1	Moved to RAF Nicosia
No. 78 Squadron RAF	15 April 1956 – 13 October 1967	Scottish Aviation Pioneer Scottish Aviation Twin Pioneer Percival Pembroke Westland Wessex	CC.1 CC.1 C.1 HC.2	Moved to RAF Sharjah
No. 84 Squadron RAF	31 December 1956 – 3 September 1967	Vickers Valetta Bristol Sycamore Percival Pembroke Blackburn Beverley Hawker Siddeley Andover	C.1 HR.14 C.1 C.1 C.1	Moved to RAF Sharjah
No. 105 Squadron RAF	15 June 1962 – 6 August 1967	Armstrong Whitworth Argosy	C.1	Moved to RAF Muharraq
No. 208 Squadron RAF	26 March - August 1956 (Det) 15 November - 30 November 1961 30 November - 9 December 1961 (Det) 9 December 1961 - 8 June 1964	Gloster Meteor Hawker Hunter Hunter Hunter	FR.9 FGA.9 FGA.9 FGA.9	Sqn at RAF Akrotiri Moved to RAF Eastleigh Sqn at RAF Eastleigh Det at RAF Muharraq
No. 233 Squadron RAF	1 September 1960 – 31 January 1964	Vickers Valetta	C.1	Disbanded
No. 683 Squadron RAF	18 December 1951 - 10 June 1952	Avro Lancaster Vickers Valetta	PR.1 C.1	Moved to RAF Habbaniyah

Units

Unit	Dates	Aircraft	Variant	Notes
No. 1417 Flight RAF	1958 – 1960 1 March 1963 – 8 September 1967	Gloster Meteor Hawker Hunter	FR.9 FR.10 / T.7	Reabsorbed into No. 8 Squadron RAF
Aden Communication Squadron RAF	1 December 1951 – 1 September 1955	Various	Various	Became Aden Protectorate Communication and Support Squadron RAF
Aden Protectorate Communication and Support Squadron RAF	1 September 1955 – 31 December 1956	Various	Various	Redesignated No. 84 Squadron RAF
Headquarters British Forces Aden Communications Flight RAF	21 March 1943 – 1 January 1944; January 1946 - 1 December 1951	Various	Various	Became Aden Communication Squadron
Aden Communication Unit RAF	1 January 1944 - January 1946	Various	Various	Reverted back to the HQ British Forces Aden Communications Flight RAF
No. 131 Maintenance Unit	9 March 1942 - 1 November 1945; 1 November 1958 - 31 August 1967	Blackburn Beverley Armstrong Whitworth Argosy Scottish Aviation aircraft Bristol Belvedere	Various	Aircraft Repair & General Engineering Sections
Search and Rescue Flight RAF, Khormaksar	13 June 1958 - 1 July 1967	Bristol Sycamore Westland Whirlwind	HR.14 HAR.2/HAR.4	Disbanded

== See also ==
- British Forces Aden
  - Air Forces Middle East
