= Arab police mutiny =

1967 rebellion among Arab police and soldiers against British rule

- Part of Aden Emergency and the aftermath of the Six-Day War
Date	19–20 June 1967
Location	Aden, Aden Protectorate
Result	British victory

Belligerents
United Kingdom	(Yemen) NLF; South Arabian Army; FLOSY

Commanders and leaders
(United Kingdom) Maj. David Miller	Unknown

Units involved
King's Own Royal Border Regiment; Queen's Dragoon Guards; Royal Corps of Transport	South Arabian Army; Aden Armed Police

Strength
Unknown	500 (est.)

Casualties and losses
24 killed 1 helicopter destroyed	Unknown

The Arab police mutiny was an incident during the Aden Emergency where Arab soldiers and police mutinied against British troops. While the mutiny itself was localized and quickly suppressed, it undermined the South Arabian Federation which had been organized by Britain in 1959 as an intended successor to direct colonial rule.

== Background ==
In 1962 the British Crown Colony of Aden became partially self-governing, before being incorporated into the Federation of South Arabia the following year. In addition to British units, Aden and the hinterland territories making up the Protectorate were garrisoned by a number of locally recruited units under British and Arab officers. On 1 June 1967 these were amalgamated to form the South Arabian Army (SAA). Since 1931 a gendarmerie style force called the Aden Armed Police had been responsible for maintaining order in Aden itself.

By 1967, relations between the residual British administration and the Arab population of Aden had become increasingly tense following the Six-Day War. With British withdrawal from Aden pending, nationalist sentiment and concern for their own future spread amongst the personnel of the locally recruited army and police units organised by the British. This was exacerbated by the suspension of three Arab colonels. Two rival nationalist groups: the National Liberation Front (NLF) and the Front for the Liberation of South Yemen (FLOSY) competed for influence amongst the Aden population at large. The loyalty of the indigenous military and police to both the Federation and to their remaining British officers became uncertain.

== Mutiny ==
On the morning of 20 June 1967 Arab soldiers of the South Arabian Army mutinied setting fire to their barracks. They then attacked a truck containing men of 60 Squadron Royal Corps of Transport, killing eight of the soldiers. The SAA mutineers then attacked Radfan Camp, killing an officer of the Lancashire Regiment, two policemen and a civil servant.

British troops of the King's Own Royal Border Regiment and the Queen's Dragoon Guards subsequently put down the SAA mutiny, rescuing officers from the camp guardroom. However unrest had spread to the Aden Armed Police who seized their barracks in the Crater District of Aden and fired from windows on a passing patrol of 2 Land Rovers carrying British troops, killing all except for one young soldier, Fusilier John Storey (of the Royal Northumberland Fusiliers), who fled to a nearby apartment block and held a family hostage for 3 hours until back-up returned (John Storey later recounted the incident on the 1985 ITV Programme End of Empire and a more detailed account in a documentary "Britain’s Small wars – a look at Aden" in 2007.). The AAP, together with armed nationalist fighters, then proceeded to occupy Crater. Twenty-four people, including 17 British soldiers had been killed in a series of separate clashes throughout the day.

== Reoccupation of Crater District and aftermath ==
On 3 July 1967, the newly arrived Argyll and Sutherland Highlanders reoccupied Crater with minimal casualties and remained in control of the district for the five months remaining until the final British withdrawal from Aden. On 7 November the SAA, now renamed the Arab Armed Forces of Occupied South Yemen, rallied to the National Liberation Front in a brief civil war with FLOSY. Following the NLF victory, the former SAA and AAP became the regular armed forces of the newly independent People's Democratic Republic of Yemen.

The significance of the mutiny lay less in its immediate impact, which was limited to part of Aden town itself and quickly contained, than its clear illustration of the fragility of the South Arabian Federation. Intended as a conservative grouping of Crown Colony and inland local rulers, the South Arabia government could not hope to survive the withdrawal of British forces.
