= Radfan =

Region of the Republic of Yemen

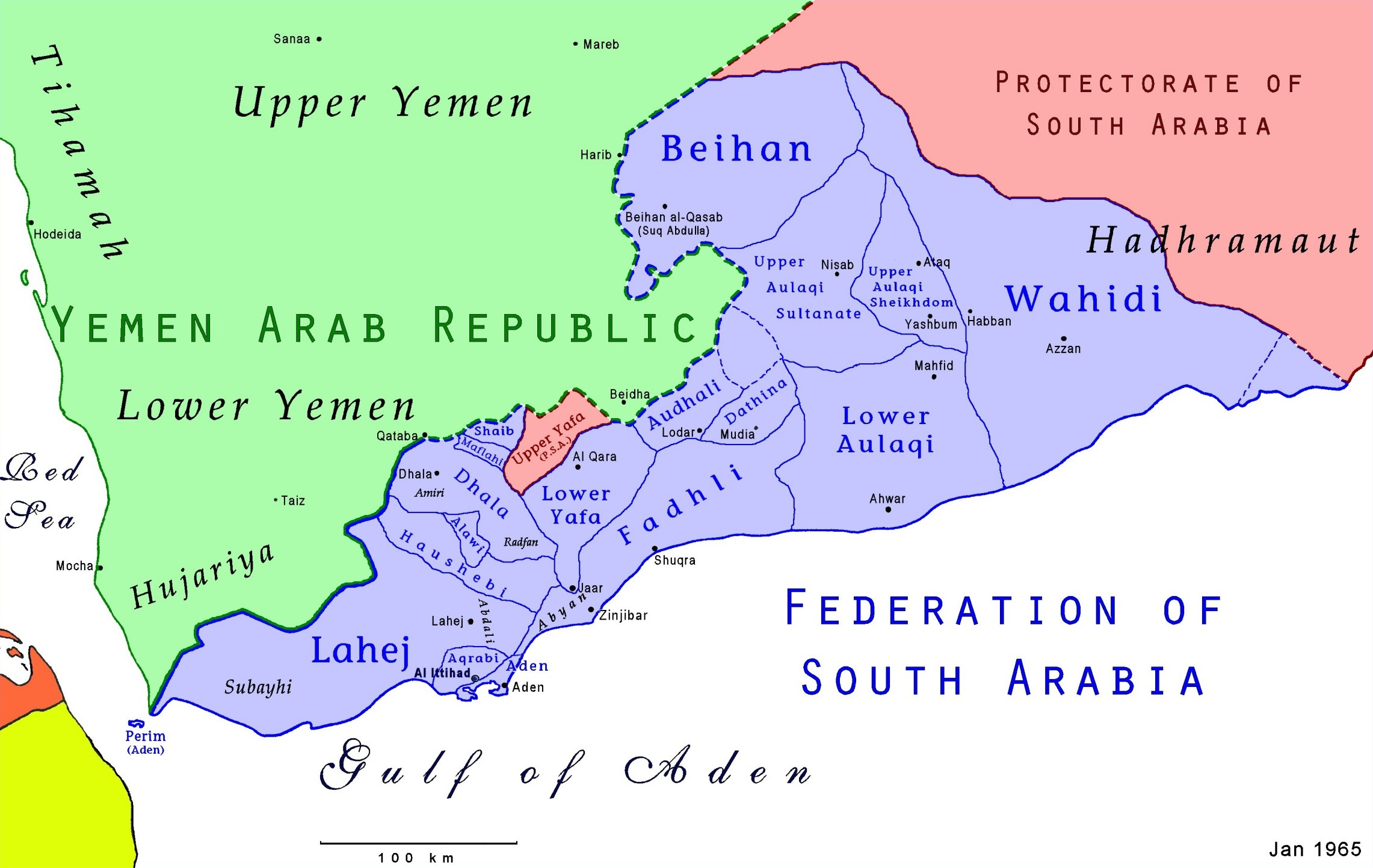
Map of the Federation of South Arabia showing Radfan within Dhala

Radfan or the Radfan Hills is a region of the Republic of Yemen. In the 1960s, the area was part of a British protectorate of Dhala (a member of the Federation of South Arabia) and was the site of intense fighting during the Aden Emergency. In 1964, local Qutaibi tribespeople attacked the British on the Aden to Mecca caravan route which passed through the nearby town Dhala (Ad Dali'). The tribespeople had traditionally collected tolls from passing caravans, but the implementation of the customs union of the Federation of South Arabia in 1962 put a stop to this. The tribespeople resented the loss of this income.

The highest peak is Jebel Huriyah at 1867 m (6125 ft).
