= Front for the Liberation of Occupied South Yemen =

1964–1967 Arab nationalist military organisation in the Federation of South Arabia

Front for the Liberation of Occupied South Yemen جبهة تحرير جنوب اليمن المحتل
- F.L.O.S.Y. initials
- Leader: Abdullah al-Asnag
- Dates active: 1964 – November 7, 1967
- Headquarters: Mountains and deserts of Yemen
- Active regions: Federation of South Arabia; Protectorate of South Arabia; South Yemen
- Ideology: Yemeni nationalism Nasserism; Anti-imperialism
- Political position: Left-wing
- Wars: Aden Emergency

The Front for the Liberation of Occupied South Yemen (FLOSY; Arabic: جبهة تحرير جنوب اليمن المحتل, romanized: jabhat taḥrīr janūb al-Yaman al-muḥtali) was an Arab nationalist military organization operating in the Federation of South Arabia (a British protectorate; now Southern Yemen) in the 1960s. As the British tried to exit, Abdullah al Asnag created the FLOSY. The FLOSY attempted to seize power when the British left from another military group operating in South Arabia, the National Liberation Front (NLF).

== Background ==
Abdullah al Asnag was a labour leader in the Aden Trade Union Congress (ATUC), a union operating in and around the British protectorate: the port of Aden. In the late 1950s, Egyptian president Gamal Abdel Nasser's Pan-Arabism had spread to the region and threatened Britain's and the traditional Emirs of the region's control. In response the British were able to convince the feuding Emirs to merge into the Federation of South Arabia. The Aden Trade Union Congress had a large influence in the new Federation's assembly and to prevent it seizing control of the Federation in 1962 the Colony of Aden joined the Federation so that Aden's pro-British assembly members could counter the ATUC's influence. The day after Aden joined the Federation, Muhammad al-Badr of the Yemenese monarchy was overthrown and civil war ensued between forces backed by Egypt like the National Liberation Front (NLF) and monarchist forces backed by the British. This conflict spread throughout the region becoming the Aden Emergency and officially began on 10 December 1963, when a state of emergency was declared in the State of Aden. The NLF campaign for power spread to the Federation of South Arabia in 1964. In 1964 a new government headed by the Labour Party won the United Kingdom general election. They attempted to grant independence to the Federation of South Arabia by giving Abdullah al Asnag control of the country. This proposal was vetoed by the American President Johnson who didn't want Britain to withdraw while the Americans were escalating the Vietnam War.

== Creation ==
Stencil cut from metal sheet with Arabic inscription and F.L.O.S.Y. initials, Imperial War Museum; the Arabic text reads jabhat al-taḥrīr, "Liberation Front"

In 1965 the British suspended the Federation of South Arabian government and imposed direct colonial rule. Realizing that the British weren't going to give him control Asnag fled the country and joined the NLF. However elements of the NLF became more radical Marxist and they split from the Egyptians. Asnag formed his own military organization, FLOSY, in order to counter the NLF. The NLF quickly denounced Asnag and FLOSY as Imperialist forces under control of Nasser and in addition to attacking the British also engaged FLOSY in combat. By February 1967 the British could no longer control or protect its bases in Aden and announced it was leaving the country, against American wishes. Nasser threw its weight behind FLOSY and arrested the head of the NLF who was living at the time in Egypt. Officially FLOSY and the NLF refused to talk to the leaving British forces as they didn't want to be seen as agents of British Imperialism. The last governor of Aden, Sir Humphrey Trevelyan, left the country with no immediately apparent successor. As a point of respect, he had the government house repainted for whoever emerged victorious. However unofficial secret talks were held between the British and the NLF who conspired to defeat FLOSY so that the Nasser-supported FLOSY would be defeated.

== Destruction ==
On November 30, 1967 Federation of South Arabia ceased to exist with the creation of the People's Republic of South Yemen. In 1967, Nasser was defeated in the Six-Day War and was forced to pull troops out of Yemen. This left FLOSY without any military support from its Egyptian allies. With the loss of Egyptian support, the NLF allied with Yemen's Federal army, allowing them to defeat FLOSY. On November 7, 1967 FLOSY took heavy losses attacking a federal army base in conjunction with the NLF. With that defeat, the military forces of FLOSY ceased to exist although some cadres and leaders remained outside the country.

== Bibliography ==
Notes

References

- Dean, Lucy (2004). The Middle East and North Africa 2004 (2004 ed.). Routledge. ISBN 978-1-85743-184-1.
- Kitchen, Martin (1994). Empire and after: a short history of the British Empire and Commonwealth (1994 ed.). Centre for Distance Education, Simon Fraser University. ISBN 978-0-86491-142-1.
- Kostiner, Joseph (1984). The struggle for South Yemen (1984 ed.). Taylor & Francis. ISBN 978-0-7099-1504-1.
- Mawby, Spencer (2005). British policy in Aden and the protectorates 1955-67: last outpost of a Middle East empire (2005 ed.). Routledge. ISBN 978-0-7146-5459-1.
