= Aden =

Temporary capital of Yemen

Aden عَدَنْ
- Temporary capital and city
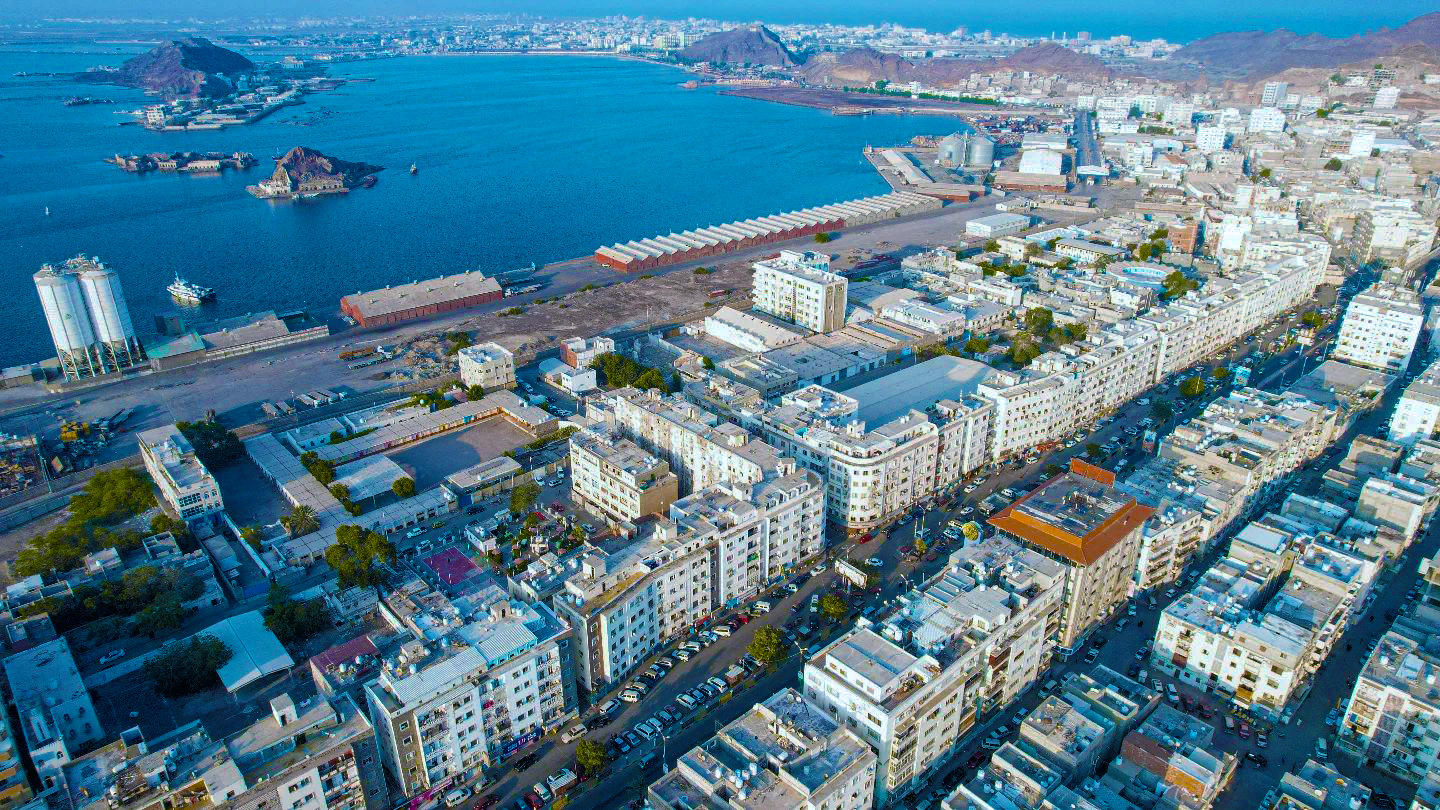
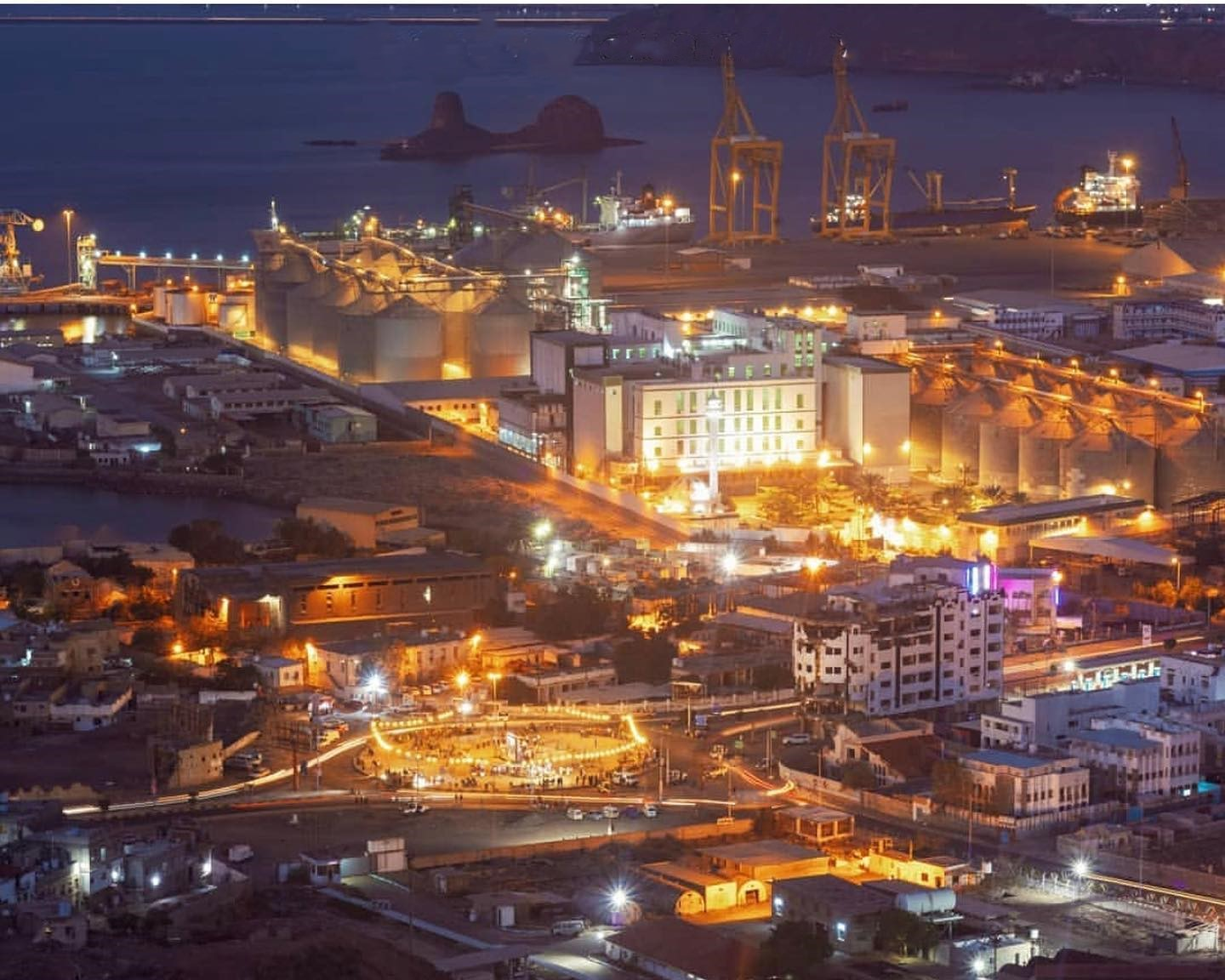
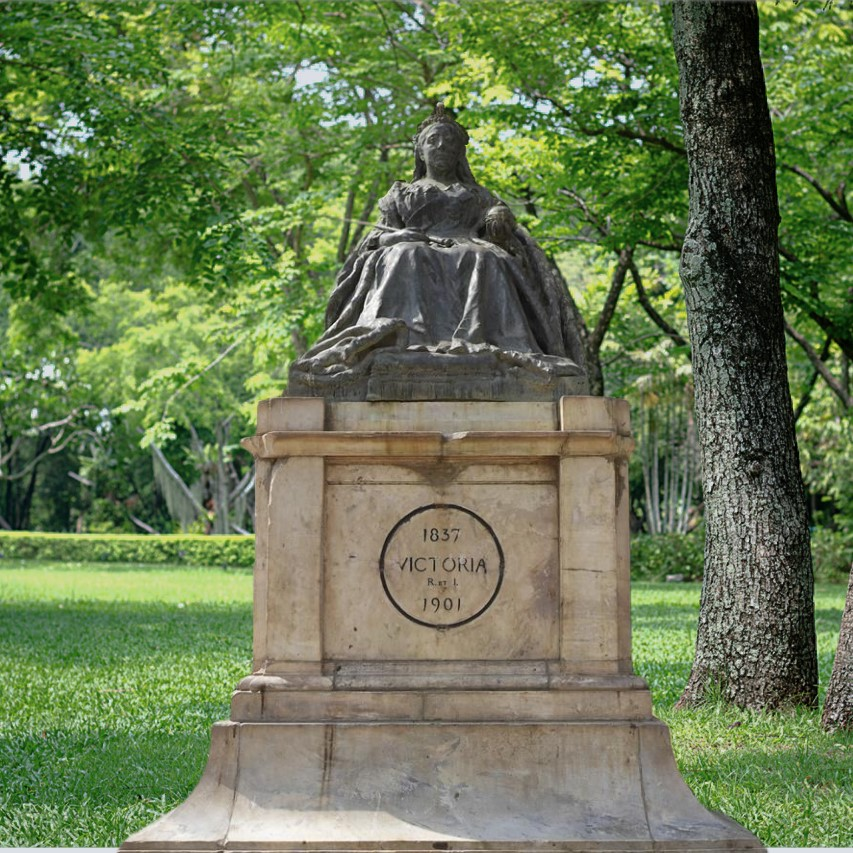
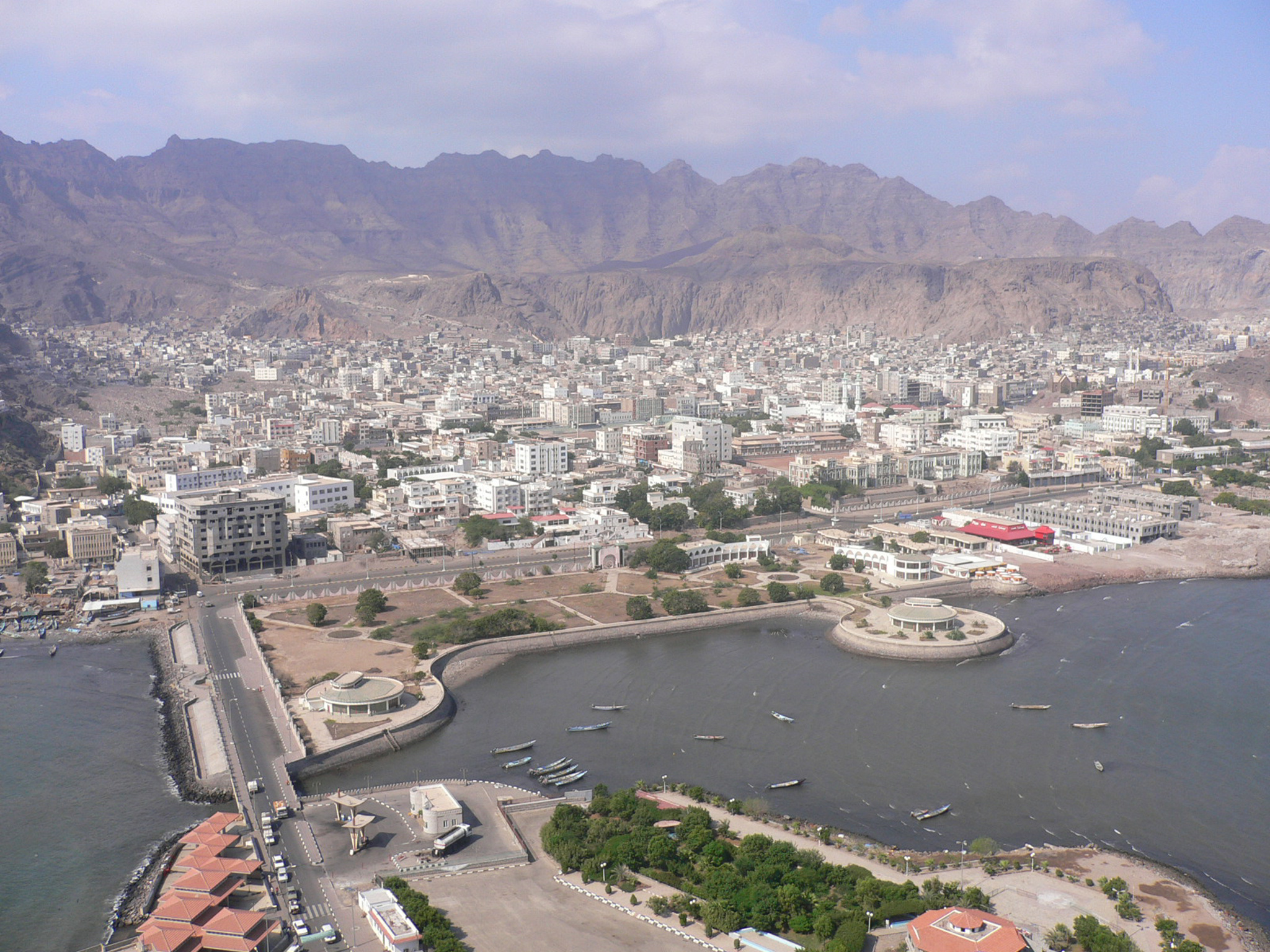
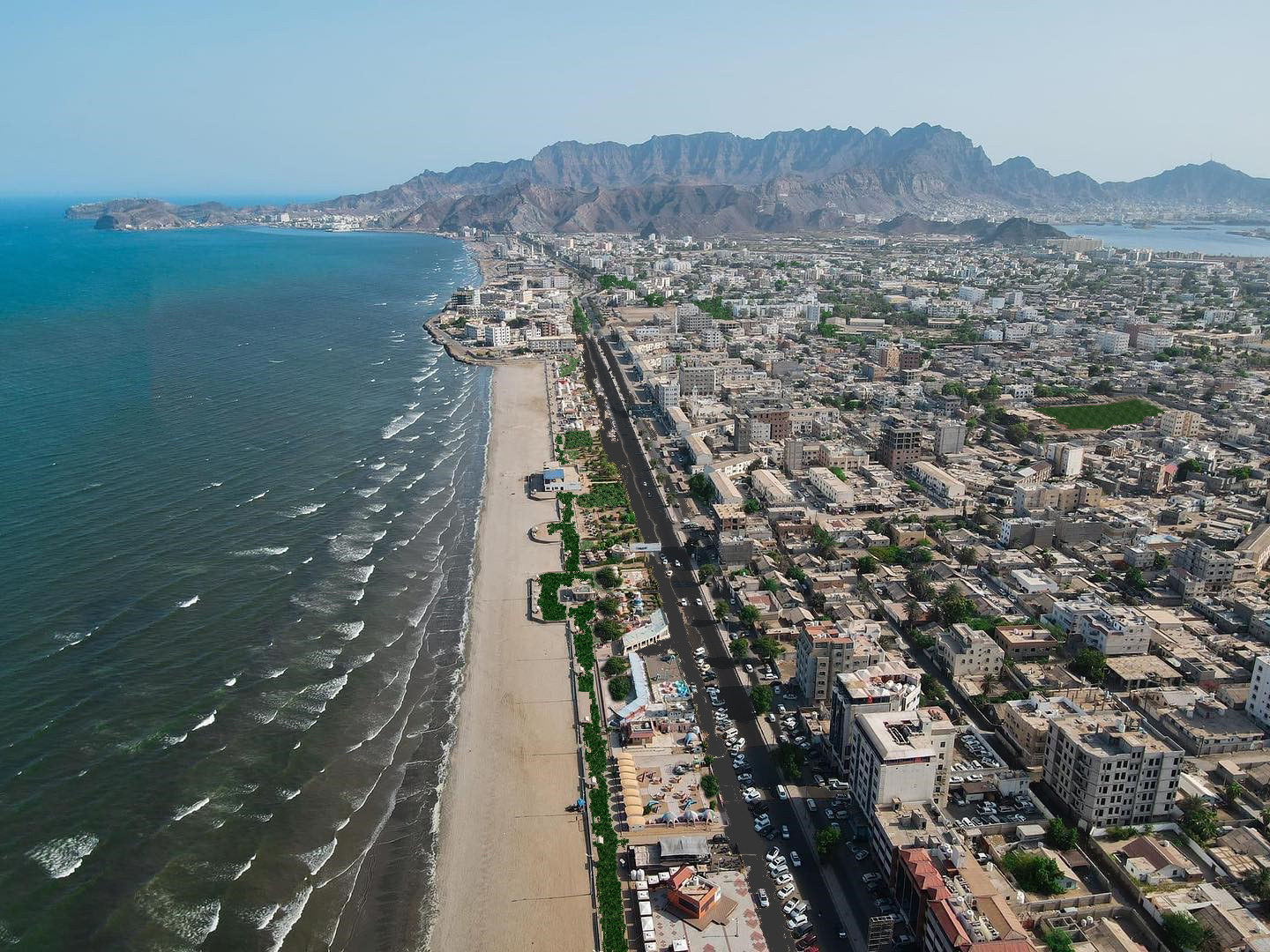
- Mualla District Port of Aden Queen Victoria Statue Crater Khor Maksar

- Location in Yemen
- Coordinates: 12°48′N 45°02′E
- Country: Yemen
- Governorate: Aden Governorate
- First settled: 7th century BC
- British occupation: 19 January 1839; 187 years ago
- State of Aden within the FSA: 18 January 1963; 63 years ago
- Independence: 30 November 1967; 58 years ago

Government
  - Governor: Abdulrahman Al-Yafei
  - Governing body: Aden Local Council
  - Aden Police Director: Maj Gen Mutahar Al-Shuaibi

Area
  - Total: 760 km^{2} (290 sq mi)
- Elevation: 6 m (20 ft)

Population (2017)
  - Total: 863,000 ▲
  - Estimate (2026): 1,194,160 ▲
  - Density: 1,135.52/km^{2} (2,941.0/sq mi)
- Demonym: Adeni/Adenies

Ethnicities
  - Majority: Arabs
  - Minorities: Afro-Arabs, Indians, Pakistanis, Somalis

Languages
  - Official: Arabic MSA (Education and Government)
  - Spoken: Adeni Arabic (majority) English (widely used) Hindi, Somali (minorities)
- Time zone: UTC+3 (AST)
- Area code: 02

Historical affiliations

Kingdom of Awsan
Himyarite Kingdom
Kingdom of Aksum
Sasanian Yemen
First Islamic state
Rashidun Caliphate
Umayyad Caliphate
Abbasid Caliphate
Ziyadid dynasty
Najahid dynasty
Sulayhid dynasty
Zurayid dynasty
Ayyubid dynasty
Rasulid dynasty
Tahirid Sultanate
Mamluk Sultanate
Portuguese Aden
Yemen Eyalet
Qasimid State
Yemen Vilayet
Qasimid State
Sultanate of Lahej 1728–1839
(British Raj) Aden Province 1839–1937
Aden Colony 1937–1963
(British Empire) Aden protectorate 1937–1963
State of Aden within the FSA 1963–1967
South Yemen 1967–1990
Republic of Yemen 1990–1994
Democratic Republic of Yemen 1994
Republic of Yemen 1994–present

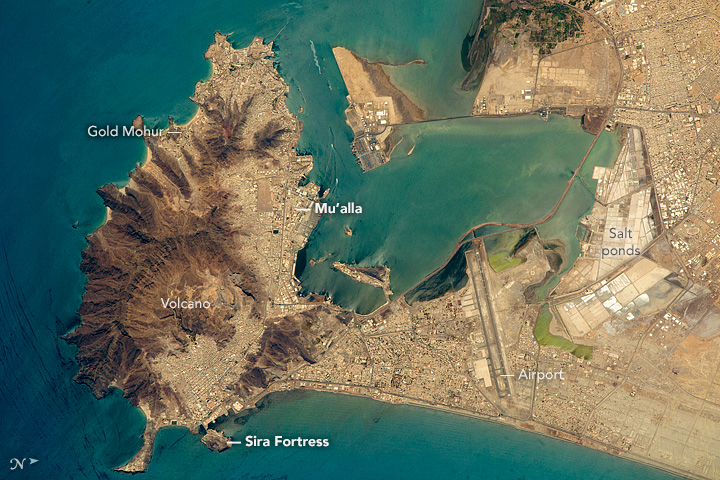
Port of Aden from the ISS, 2016

Aden (Note: /ˈeɪdən/; Arabic: عَدَنْ, romanised: ʿAdan; IPA: [ʕa.dan]) is an ancient port city in the southern part of the Arabian peninsula, on the north coast of the Gulf of Aden, positioned near the eastern approach to the Red Sea, and has been the de facto capital of the internationally recognized government of Yemen since 2014. It is approximately 170 km (110 mi) east of the Strait of Bab al-Mandab. With its strategic location on the coastline, Aden serves as a gateway between the Red Sea and the Arabian Sea, making it a crucial maritime hub connecting Africa, Asia, and the Middle East.

In 2026, Aden had a population estimated at 1,194,160, making it one of the largest cities in Yemen. It is the capital and principal part of Aden Governorate, encompassing eight districts. During the colonial period, the name Aden referred to the area along the north coast of the gulf, encompassing Tawahi, Mualla, Crater, and much of Khor Maksar district. The western harbour peninsula, known as Little Aden, now falls within the Al Buraiqeh district.

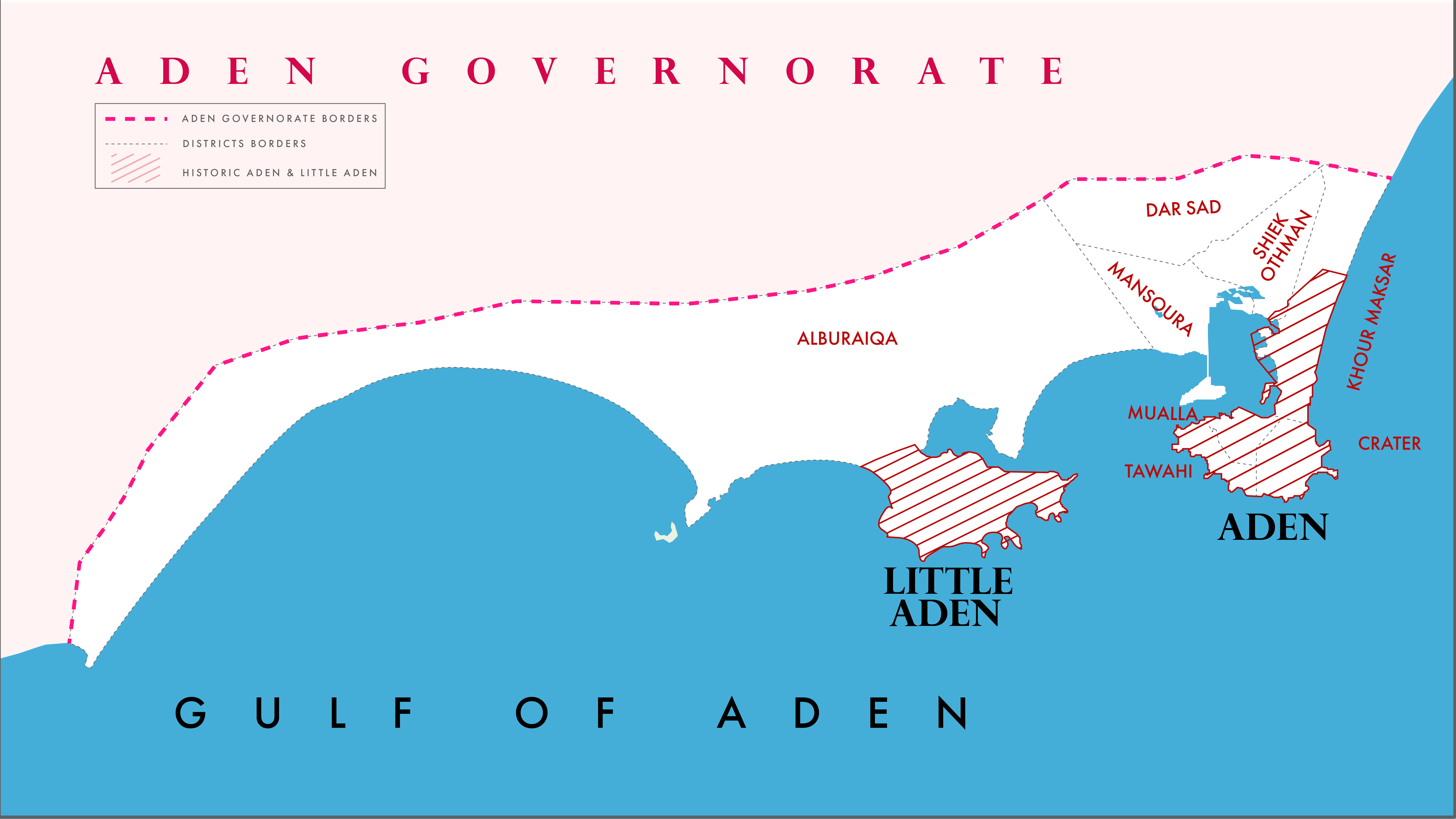
Map showing Aden and Little Aden within the modern-day Governorate of Aden

The city and surrounding area were under the British Empire from 1839 until independence in 1967. Before gaining independence, Aden comprised distinct sectors: Crater, the original port; Ma'alla, the modern port; Tawahi, formerly "Steamer Point"; and Gold Mohur resorts. Khormaksar, on the isthmus connecting Aden to the mainland, hosts diplomatic missions, Aden University's main offices, and Aden International Airport. On the mainland, sectors include Sheikh Othman, an old oasis area; Al-Mansura, a British-planned town; and Madinat ash-Sha'b (formerly Madinat al-Ittihad), the former capital of the South Arabian Federation, now the location of a large power/desalination facility and additional Aden University faculties.

Aden encloses the eastern side of a vast natural harbour that constitutes the modern port. Little Aden was developed as the site of the oil refinery and tanker port. Both were established and operated by British Petroleum until they were turned over to South Yemeni government ownership and control in 1978.

Aden was the capital of South Yemen from 1967 until that state's union with North Yemen in 1990. It has been the temporary capital of the internationally recognized government of Yemen since the Houthi takeover of Sanaa in the start of the Yemeni civil war in 2014, hosting some members of the Cabinet of Yemen mainly in al-Maashiq Palace. It was also the seat of the secessionist Southern Transitional Council from 2018 to 2026.

== Etymology ==
Aden is a home and a place for ships, and in Arabic the word "Aden" means residence, and it is said "Aden Al-Balad", meaning the settlement of the country. Among the sayings of geographers about the city:

Yaqut al-Hamwi said: "It is a famous city on the coast of the Indian Sea, towards the Yemen, and it is poor, with no water or pasture. They drink from a spring between it and Aden, about a distance of about today, and despite that, it is bad, except that this place is the port for Indian ships, and merchants gather there for that reason, as it is a town of trade." And it is added to Abyan, which is the opposite of Aden in its entirety.

Ibn Manzur said: "It is a country on the edge of the sea in the furthest part of Yemen."

Ibn Khaldun said: "This Aden is one of the most fortified cities in Yemen, and it is on the bank of the Indian Sea. It is still a country of trade from the time of the Trabaids, and most of them were built with stones, which is why silk merchants visit it often."

== History ==
=== Antiquity ===
Aden is an ancient port and was mentioned by the Greeks under the name (Ancient Greek: Αραβία Εμπόριον, romanised: Arabia Emporion), which means an Arabic trade port. The port's convenient position on the sea route between India and Europe has made Aden desirable to rulers who sought to possess it at various times throughout history. Known as Eudaemon (Ancient Greek: Ευδαίμων, meaning "blissful, prosperous") in the 1st century BC, it was a transshipping point for the Red Sea trade, but fell on hard times when new shipping practices by-passed it and made the daring direct crossing to India in the 1st century AD, according to the Periplus of the Erythraean Sea. The same work describes Aden as "a village by the shore", which would well describe the town of Crater while it was still little developed. There is no mention of fortification at this stage. Aden was more an island than a peninsula, as the isthmus (a tombolo) was not then so developed as it is today. Aden was explicitly mentioned by this name in the Book of Ezekiel, which talks about Jerusalem, and it says:

"The merchants of Sheba and Raamah are your merchants. They set up your markets with the finest perfumes and every precious stone and gold. Harran, Qena, and Aden are the merchants of Sheba, and Assyria and Kilmud are your merchants."

At its beginning, the city was a small peninsula with no significant natural resources, but its location between Egypt and India made it important in the ancient Indian Ocean trade route. The city was the home of the ancient Kingdom of Awsan from the eighth to seventh centuries BC. In the beginning of the seventh century BC, Karibʾil Watar I, king of the Kingdom of Sheba, launched a campaign against Awsan during which, according to the Sabaean texts, sixteen thousand people were killed, forty thousand people were enslaved, and the kings of Awsan made offerings to the god Almaqah, according to the inscription that Karibʾil Watar I left in Sirwah, commemorating his victory.

In the second half of the first century BC, the Roman Emperor Augustus Caesar determined to control Arabia Felix and reach the Indian Ocean. Aelius Gallus' Roman expedition to Arabia Felix (26–25 BCE) aimed to capture the Sabaean capital of Marib but failed due to extreme desert conditions, disease, and logistical challenges. After an unsuccessful week-long siege, the army, weakened by illness and dehydration, withdrew, losing most of its ~10,000 troops to environmental factors and disease" The Himyarites overthrew the Kingdom of Sheba in 275 AD and took control of Aden. Recent incomplete archaeological studies suggest that the Himyarites were the ones who built the huge water cisterns currently known as the "Cisterns of Aden", which stored nearly 30 million imperial gallons of water (approximately 130 million litres).

The Himyarite Kingdom fell in the first quarter of the sixth century AD. Yusuf Dhu Nuwas mentioned Bab al-Mandab in one of his writings. The forces of the Kingdom of Aksum were entering Yemen through it. The Byzantine Emperor Justinian I sent a fleet to fight the Himyarite Jews and support the Kingdom of Aksum and the Christians of Najran. The fleet entered through Aden. Byzantine sources indicate that the Sasanian Empire took control of the city in 571 AD.

A local legend in Yemen states that Aden may be as old as human history itself. Some also believe that Cain and Abel are buried somewhere in the city.

=== Medieval history ===
Although the pre-Islamic Himyar civilisation was capable of building large structures, there seems to have been little fortification at this stage. Fortifications at Mareb and other places in Yemen and the Hadhramaut make it clear that both the Himyar and the Sabean cultures were well capable of it. Thus, watchtowers, since destroyed, are possible. However, the Arab historians Ibn al Mujawir and Abu Makhramah attribute the first fortification of Aden to Beni Zuree'a. Abu Makhramah has also included a detailed biography of Muhammad Azim Sultan Qamarbandi Naqsh in his work, Tarikh ul-Yemen. The aim seems to have been twofold: to keep hostile forces out and to maintain revenue by controlling the movement of goods, thereby preventing smuggling. In its original form, some of this work was relatively feeble.

With the introduction of Islam to Yemen in the seventh century AD, Aden experienced a period of stagnation that lasted until the ninth century AD. In the early years of Islam, Aden belonged to the province of Jund (Taiz). It was controlled by the state of Ziyadid and the Sulayhid. After the death of Ali bin Muhammad Al-Sulayhi, his son took charge of Zurayids, and Aden continued to pay the annual royalty until Queen Arwa bint Ahmed Al-Sulayhi reduced it. After the fall of the Sulayhid state, the Banu Zurayi became independent in Aden, taking advantage of the Sulayhids' preoccupation with the Khawlan tribes. The Zurayites continued to rule Aden, Lahj, and Abyan for less than forty years until they fell under the Ayyubids' control of the city. A major battle took place between Turan Shah bin Ayyub and Yasser bin Bilal al-Muhammadi, Minister of State, and the Zurayiyyah were defeated and al-Muhammadi fled to Taiz. One of the most important contributors to the defeat of the Zurayids was their ongoing wars with the Bani Mahdi in Tihama and the departure of their army to confront the Ayyubids instead of fortifying themselves in Aden.

After 1175, rebuilding in a more solid form began, and ever since then Aden has been a popular city attracting sailors and merchants from Egypt, Sindh, Gujarat, East Africa and even China. According to Muqaddasi, Persians formed the majority of Aden's population in the 10th century. It was visited by the medieval scholar Ibn Battuta in the 14th century, who described Aden's reservoirs, the Cisterns of Tawila, "These reservoirs accumulate rainwater for the sole purpose of drinking for the city's citizens."

During the Ayyubid period in Yemen, Sanaa and its environs were more hostile to their presence than other regions. The Zaidi tribes were able to defeat the Ayyubids in 1226, but Omar bin Rasul, the founder of the Rasulid state, was able to repel them, so he tightened his control over Aden. The city regained its position during the days of the Rasulids, so they dug wells and built schools, and Aden flourished commercially. The kings of Bani Rasul were also merchants and enacted a number of laws and regulations to codify trade in the city.

The Banu Tahir were able to control Aden after the Banu Rasool, and the Italian traveller Lodovico di Verthama describes it as one of the most powerful cities seen on Earth during the days of the Tahirids.

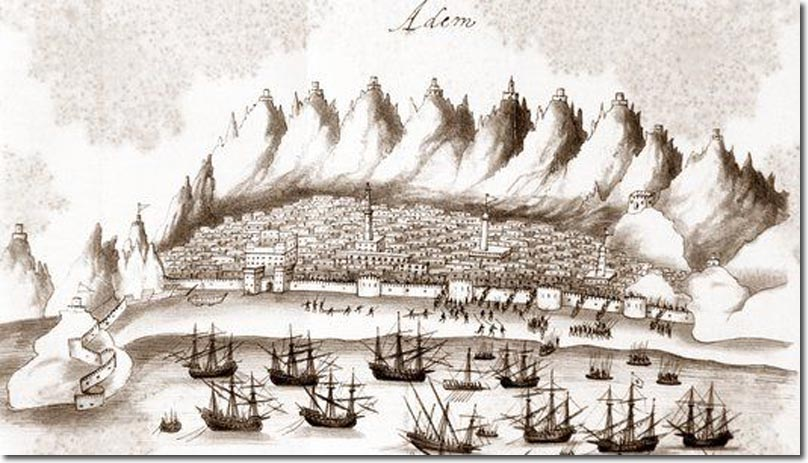
Portuguese conquistador and viceroy Afonso de Albuquerque failed twice to capture Aden in 1513.

In 1513, the Portuguese, led by Afonso de Albuquerque, launched an unsuccessful four-day naval siege of Aden. The Mamluks in Egypt sensed the danger and sent a force led by Hussein al-Kurdi. The victorious King Amer bin Abdul Wahhab provided great aid to the Kurds, but he suffered a heavy defeat in the Battle of Diu. The Mamluks sent a second fleet, but the victorious king refused to cooperate with the Mamluks because he had succeeded in repelling the Portuguese from Aden without their help. Hussein al-Kurdi became angry and allied with the Zaidi Imam, who was opposed to the Tahirids, al-Mutawakkil Sharaf al-Din, and the Tahirid cities fell successively, with the exception of Aden. The Ottoman Empire took control of the city in 1538. The Ottomans' goal was to prevent the Portuguese from controlling Aden, so the city witnessed difficult days, in addition to the fact that the port of Mocha gained greater importance at the expense of Aden during the sixteenth century. The city's population declined and it turned into a small village with a population of no more than 600 people. While its population was approximately eighty thousand people during the days of the Rasulid state.

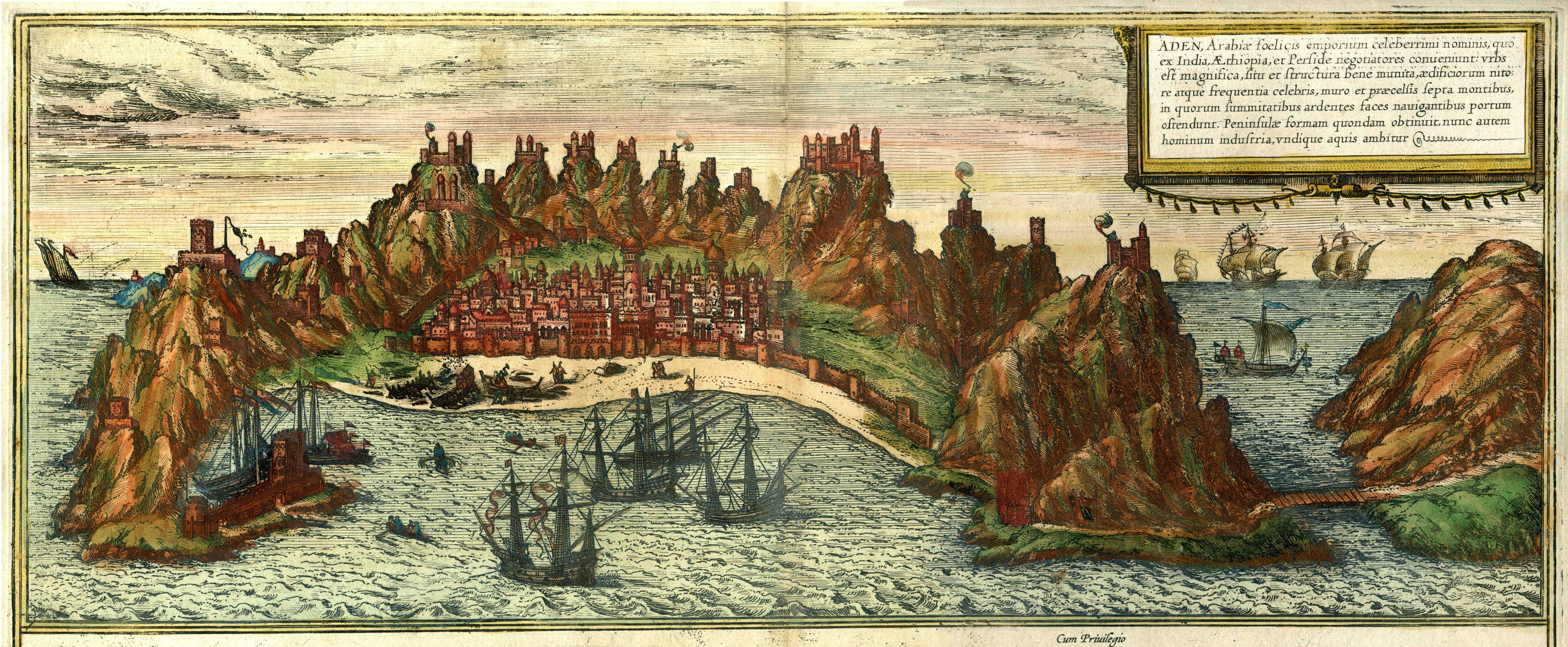
Aden, with Portuguese fleet (1590)

In 1421, China's Ming dynasty Yongle Emperor ordered principal envoy grand eunuch Li Xing and grand eunuch Zhou Man of Zheng He's fleet to convey an imperial edict with hats and robes to bestow on the king of Aden. The envoys boarded three treasure ships and set sail from Sumatra to the port of Aden. This event was recorded in the book Yingyai Shenglan by Ma Huan who accompanied the imperial envoy.

Plan of Aden on the south coast of Arabia 1703 - Jan 11th 1784

After Ottoman rule, Aden was ruled by the Sultanate of Lahej, under suzerainty of the Zaidi imams of Yemen. The first political intercourse between Lahej and the British took place in 1799, when a naval force was sent from Great Britain, with a detachment of troops from India, to occupy the island of Perim and prevent all communication of the French in Egypt with the Indian Ocean, by way of the Red Sea. The island of Perim was found unsuitable for troops, and the Sultan of Lahej, Ahmed bin Abdul Karim, received the detachment for some time at Aden. He proposed to enter into an alliance and to grant Aden as a permanent station, but the offer was declined. A Treaty was, however, concluded with the Sultan in 1802 by Admiral Sir Home Popham, who was instructed to enter into political and commercial alliances with the chief rulers on the Arabian coast of the Red Sea.

=== Modern history ===
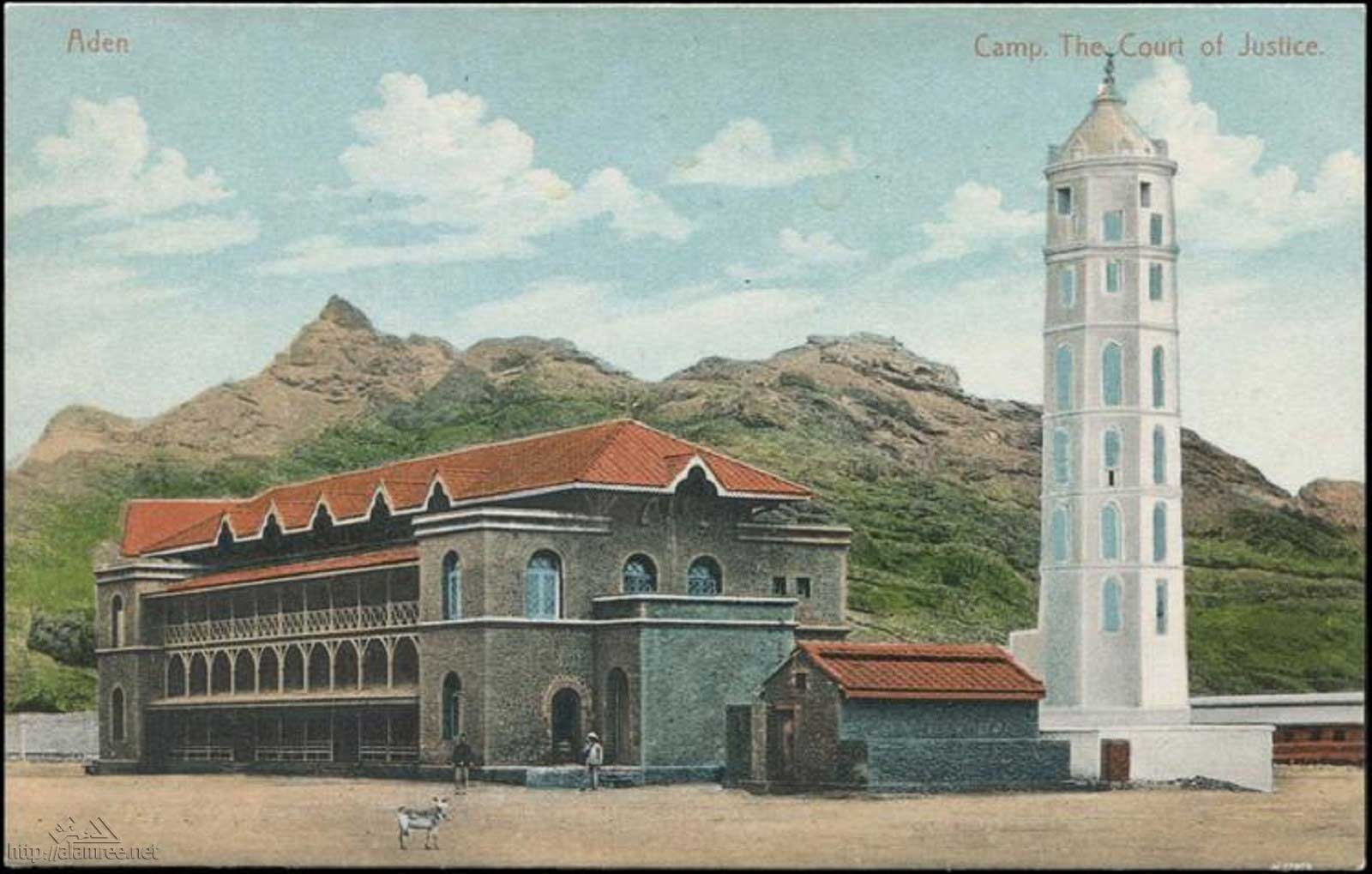
Crater lighthouse next to the post office at the beginning of the last century

The situation was different in the north of the country, where the Zaidis did not recognise the authority of the Ottomans and revolted against them many times, the most recent of which was the revolution of Imam Al-Mansur Billah Al-Qasim bin Muhammad bin Al-Qasim, who and his son Al-Mu'ayyad Billah Muhammad were able to unite the tribes and expel the Ottomans. The imams relied on the revenues from the port of Mocha, and Aden was not as important as the Abadlahs were. At the end of the eighteenth century, Sultan Fadl al-Abdali concluded an alliance with the Yafi tribes to rebel against the Zaidi imams and monopolise Aden's revenues equally among them. The Sultan of Lahej got rid of the imams, but he did not fulfil his promise to Yafa. The Zaidi imams did not recognise inheritance and saw fighting for the imamate, so the war between Al-Nasir Muhammad bin Ishaq and Al-Mansur Al-Hussein bin Al-Mutawakkil prolonged, so Al-Abdali took the opportunity to declare his independence in Lahej and Aden. The English had been visiting Aden and Mocha from 1609, led by Sir Henry Middleton, who was imprisoned, his ships confiscated, and eight of his men killed.

The British tried to conclude treaties with the Zaidi imams after the Ottomans were expelled from Aden. They visited Sanaa and Mocha, but they treated the British ambassador poorly and rejected his offer. Things were different when the Abdali gained independence from Lahj and Medina. They signed a treaty with the British in 1802, stipulating that they build a factory in Crater and allocate a special cemetery for British subjects free of charge. The Abdali wanted protection from the tribes. Sultan Fadl bin Ali was killed by Yafi' gunmen, then one of the sheikhs of Al-Hujariya invaded Lahj and besieged it for five months. Al-Awaliq also besieged it with eight thousand fighters, and they did not leave until Sultan Ahmed bin Abdul Karim paid them seven thousand dollars. Then the Fadl family attacked Aden in 1836.

==== British administration 1839–1967 ====
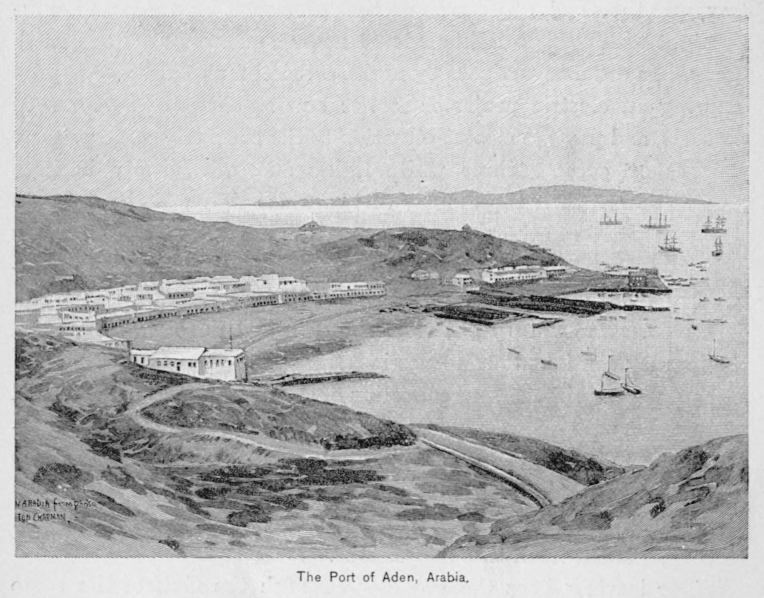
Port of Aden, 1890

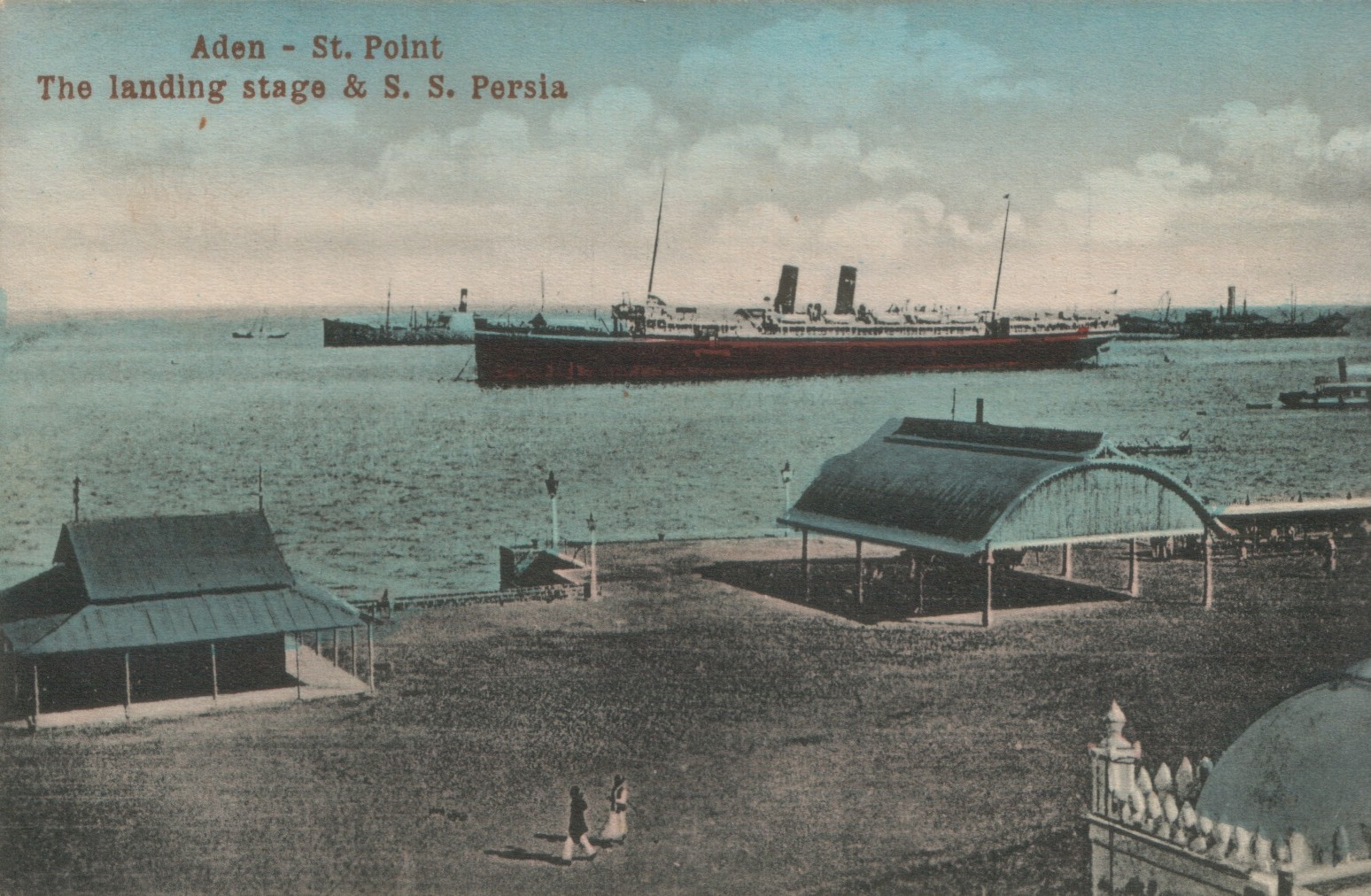
Port of Aden (around 1910). Ships lying off Steamer Point at the entrance to the modern inner harbour.

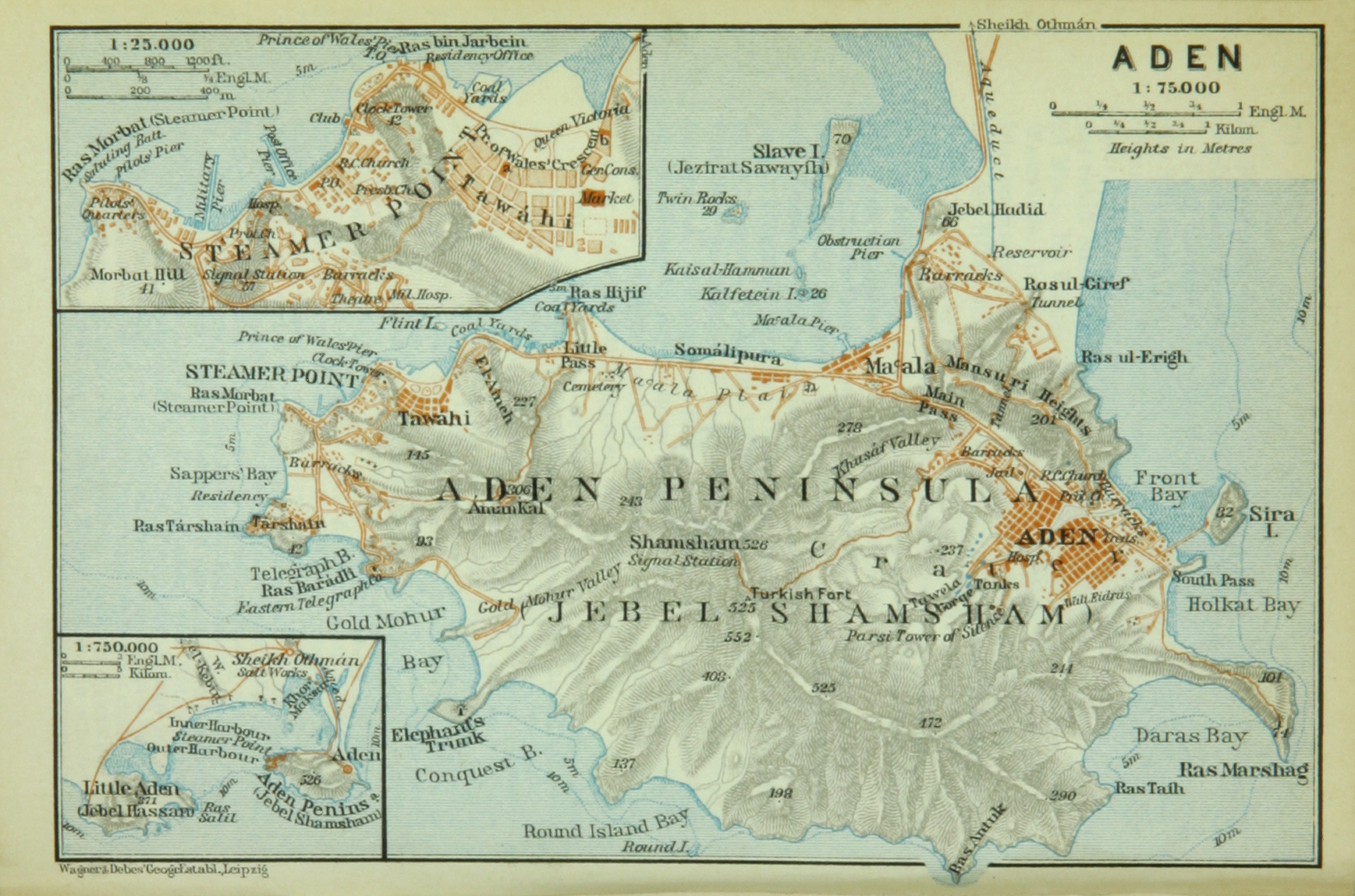
Map of Aden peninsula, c. 1914

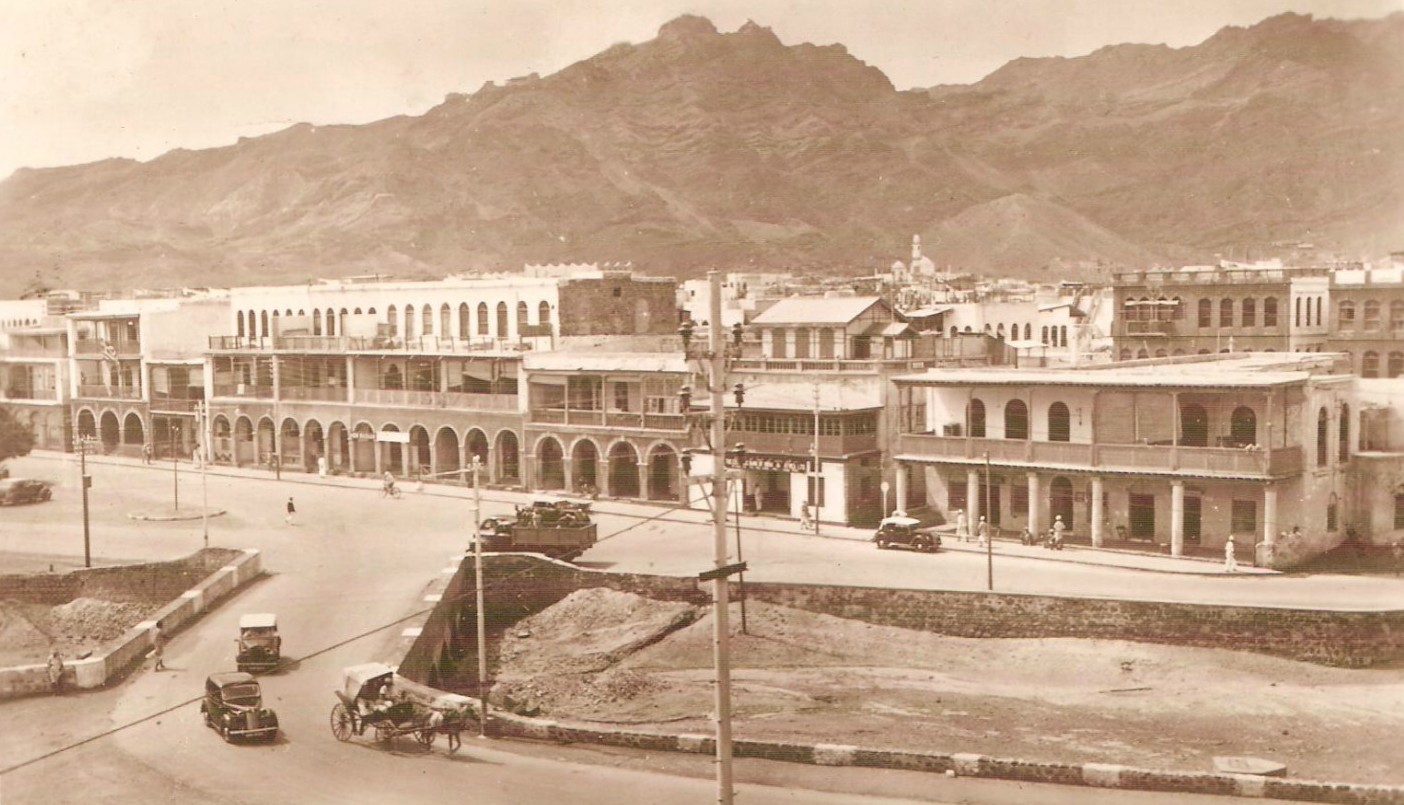
Esplanade Road in the late 1940s

In 1609 The Ascension was the first English ship to visit Aden, before sailing on to Mocha during the fourth voyage of the East India Company.

British interests in Aden began in 1796 with Napoleon's invasion of Egypt, after which a British fleet docked at Aden for several months at the invitation of the sultan. The French were defeated in Egypt in 1801, and their privateers were tracked down over the subsequent decade. By 1800, Aden was a small village with a population of 600 Arabs, Somalis, Jews, and Indians—housed for the most part in huts of reed matting erected among ruins recalling a vanished era of wealth and prosperity. As there was little British trade in the Red Sea, most British politicians until the 1830s had no further interest in the area beyond the suppression of piracy. However, a small number of government officials and the East India Company officials thought that a British base in the area was necessary to prevent another French advance through Egypt or Russian expansion through Persia. The emergence of Muhammad Ali of Egypt as a strong local ruler only increased their concerns. The governor of Bombay from 1834 to 1838, Sir Robert Grant, was one of those who believed that India could only be protected by preemptively seizing "places of strength" to protect the Indian Ocean.

The Red Sea increased in importance after the steamship Hugh Lindsay sailed from Bombay to the Suez isthmus in 1830, stopping at Aden with the sultan's consent to resupply with coal. Although cargo was still carried around the Cape of Good Hope in sailing ships, a steam route to the Suez could provide a much quicker option for transporting officials and important communications. Grant felt that armed ships steaming regularly between Bombay and Suez would help secure British interests in the region and did all he could to progress his vision. After lengthy negotiations due to the costs of investing in the new technology, the government agreed to pay half the costs for six voyages per year and the East India Company board approved the purchase of two new steamers in 1837. Grant immediately announced that monthly voyages to Suez would take place, despite the fact that no secure coal supplying station had been found. The British first stationed a coal depot on the island of Socotra in 1834. However, due to the lack of suitable infrastructure there, they quickly lost interest in Socotra and turned towards Aden instead.

In 1838, under Muhsin bin Fadl, Lahej ceded 194 km^{2} (75 sq mi) including Aden to the British. On 19 January 1839, the British East India Company landed Royal Marines at Aden to definitively conquer the territory (the so-called Aden Expedition) and stop attacks by pirates against British shipping to India. In 1850 it was declared a free trade port, with the liquor, salt, arms, and opium trades developing duties as it won all the coffee trade from Mokha. The port lies about equidistant from the Suez Canal, Bombay, and Zanzibar, which were all important British possessions. Aden had been an entrepôt and a way-station for ships in the ancient world. There, supplies, particularly water, were replenished, so, in the mid-19th century, it became necessary to replenish coal and boiler water. Thus Aden acquired a coaling station at Steamer Point and Aden was to remain under British control until November 1967.

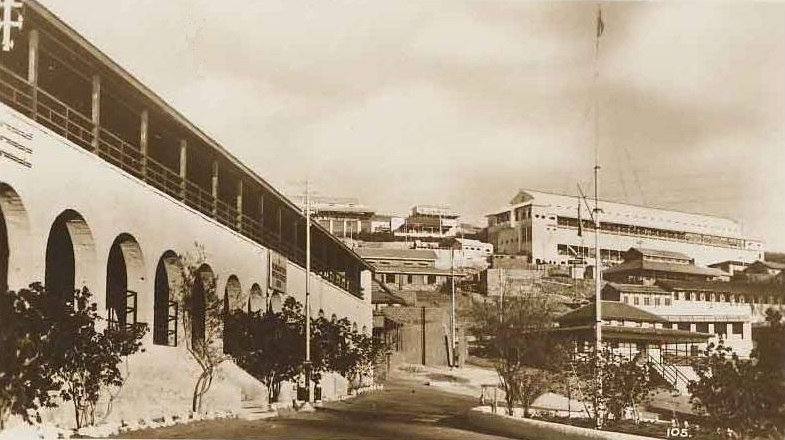
Photograph showing the headquarters of the British Forces in Aden (in Barrack Hill, Steamer Point). The R.A.F. Hospital is seen in the background. Cropped from a postcard published c. 1935.

Until 1937, Aden was governed as part of British India and was known as the Aden Settlement. Its original territory was enlarged in 1857 by the 13 km^{2} (5.0 sq mi) island of Perim, in 1868 by the 73 km^{2} (28 sq mi) Khuriya Muriya Islands, and in 1915 by the 108 km^{2} (42 sq mi) island of Kamaran. The settlement would become Aden Province in 1935.

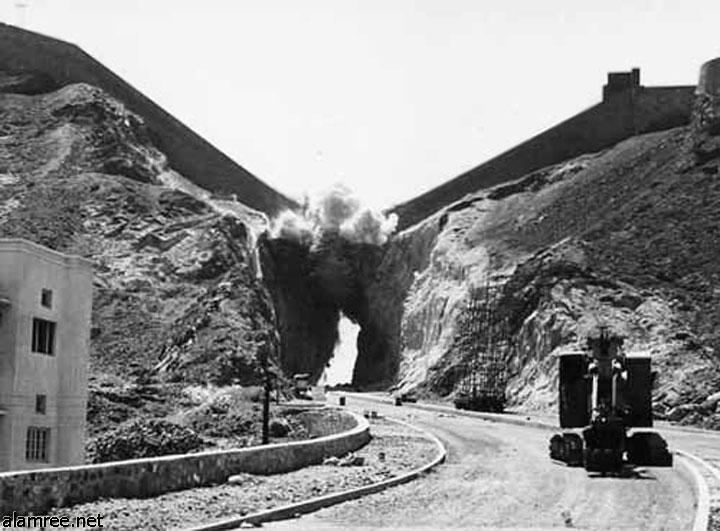
Bab Aden demolition in March 1963, under the pretext of expanding the road

In 1937, the settlement was detached from India and became the Colony of Aden, a British Crown colony. The change in government was a step towards the change in the official currency unit. When British India became independent in 1947, Indian rupees (divided into annas) were replaced in Aden by East African shillings. The hinterland of Aden and Hadhramaut were also loosely tied to Britain as the Aden Protectorate, which was overseen from Aden.

Aden's location also made it a useful entrepôt for mail passing between places around the Indian Ocean and Europe. Thus, a ship passing from Suez to Bombay could leave mail for Mombasa at Aden for collection (See Postage stamps and postal history of Aden).

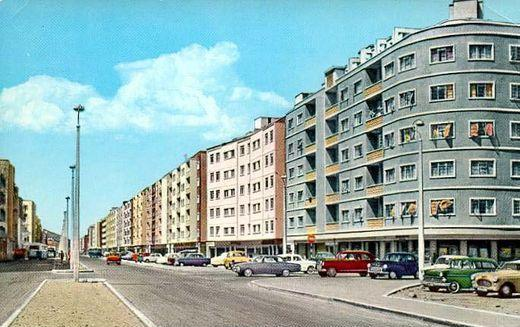
Mualla Main Road, 1963. Vehicles at the time were right-hand drive and drove on the left, in the British custom, until 1977.

In December 1947, a three-day riot broke out in reaction to the drafting of the Partition Plan for Palestine. The riots and their repression by the Aden Protectorate Levies saw the killing of 76–82 Jews, 33 Arabs, 4 Muslim Indians and 1 Somali, in addition to looting and damaging of property. After the Suez Crisis in 1956, the British held on to Aden as an outpost in the region for another decade. The British authorities had already decided to further expand its port shortly before the Suez Canal's 1956 closure.

Aden sent a team of two to the 1962 British Empire and Commonwealth Games in Perth, Western Australia.

==== Federation of South Arabia and the Aden Emergency ====
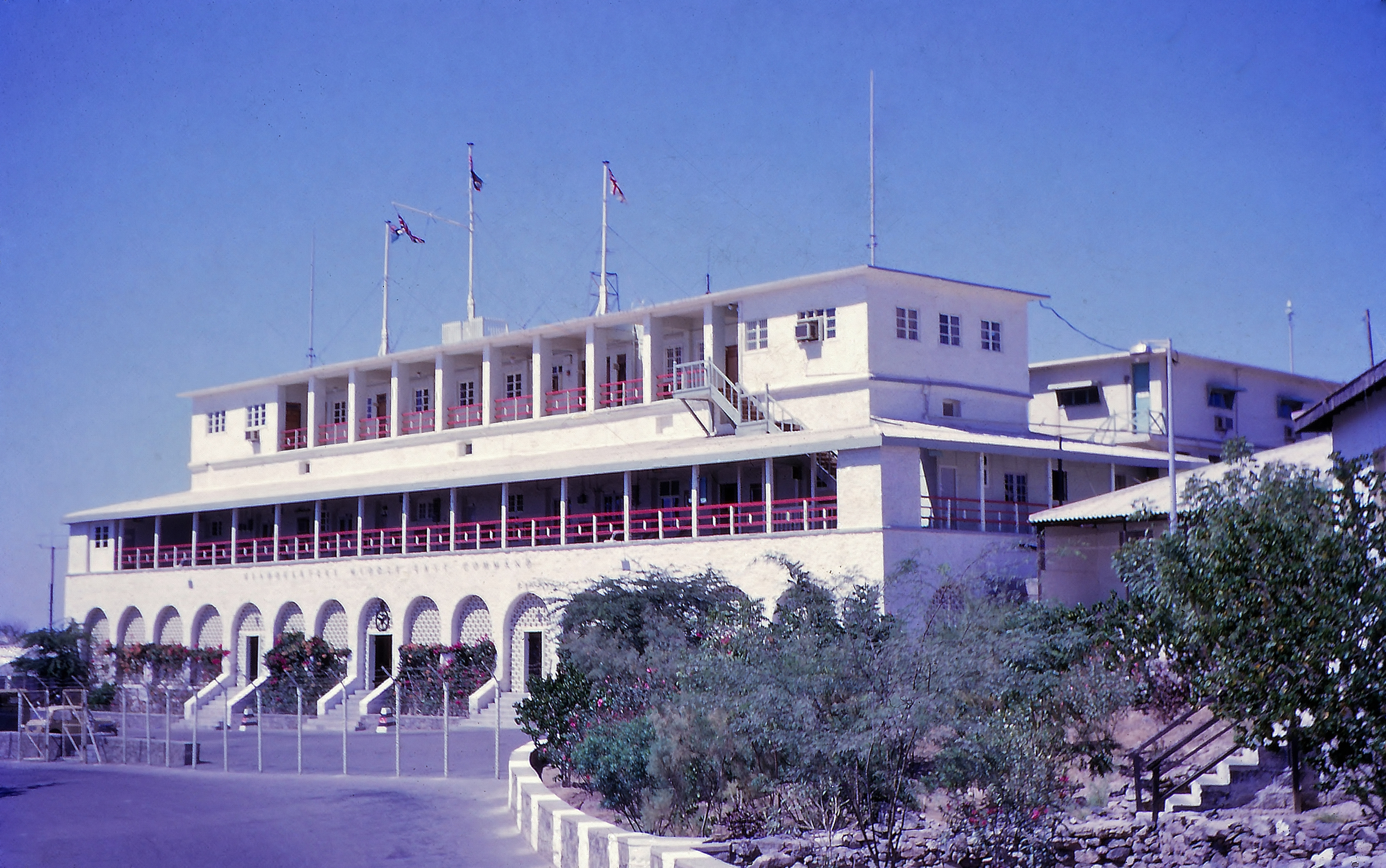
Joint Headquarters of Aden's military. Steamer Point (Tawahi), Aden, 1967

In order to stabilise Aden and the surrounding Aden Protectorate from the designs of the Egyptian backed republicans of North Yemen, the British attempted gradually to unite the disparate states of the region in preparation for eventual independence. On 18 January 1963, the Colony of Aden was incorporated into the Federation of Arab Emirates of the South against the wishes of North Yemen. The city became the State of Aden and the Federation was renamed the Federation of South Arabia (FSA).

An insurgency against British administration known as the Aden Emergency began with a grenade attack by the communist National Liberation Front (NLF), against the British High Commissioner on 10 December 1963, killing one person and injuring fifty, and a "state of emergency" was declared.

In 1964, Britain announced its intention to grant independence to the FSA in 1968, but that British troops would remain in Aden. The security situation deteriorated as NLF and FLOSY (Front for the Liberation of Occupied South Yemen) vied for the upper hand.

In January 1967, there were mass riots between the NLF and their rival FLOSY supporters in the old Arab quarter of Aden town. This conflict continued until mid February, despite the intervention of British troops. On 20 June 1967, 23 British Army soldiers were ambushed and shot dead by members of Aden Police during the Aden Mutiny in the Crater District. During the period there were as many attacks on the British troops by both sides as against each other, culminating in the destruction of an Aden Airways DC3 plane in the air with no survivors.

The increased violence was a determining factor in the British ensuring all families were evacuated more quickly than initially intended, as recorded in From Barren Rocks to Living Stones.

On 30 November 1967, British troops were evacuated, leaving Aden and the rest of the FSA under NLF control. The Royal Marines, who had been the first British troops to arrive in Aden in 1839, were almost the last to leave, followed only by the 10 Airfields Squadron of the Royal Engineers, which left Aden on 13 December 1967. Helicopters of aircraft carrier HMS Albion (R07), part of a Royal Navy task force, lifted off the Royal Marine commandos who had been left to secure the airfield.

=== Post-independence ===
The last British soldier left Aden on 30 November 1967, and the National Liberation Front had the upper hand at the expense of the Front for the Liberation of Occupied South Yemen, whose members were divided between joining the National Front or leaving for North Yemen, so Abdullah Al-Asanj and Muhammad Basindwa left for North Yemen. Qahtan al-Sha'bi assumed the presidency of the new state, and the sheikhdoms of the Eastern Protectorate of Hadramaut and Al-Mahra were annexed to the new state. Al-Shaabi took over a new country with a collapsed economy. Civilian workers and businessmen left, and British support ceased. The closure of the Suez Canal in 1967 played an important role in the country's economy, as it reduced the number of ships crossing Aden by 75%.

The new state was divided into six governorates on 11 December 1967, in order to end the manifestations of tribalism in the state and ignore the tribal borders between the defunct sheikhdoms. On March 20, 1968, Qahtan dismissed all leftist leaders from the government and party membership. He was able to put down a rebellion led by leftist factions in the army in May of the same year, and faced new rebellions from leftist parties in July, August and December 1968. This is because all Arab countries welcomed the front. National Liberation received a cold reception. Regimes like Egypt wanted to merge the National Front with the Front for the Liberation of Occupied South Yemen, where the leftist section was more numerous than the supporters of the popular Qahtan. They wanted a regime that would lead the masses and face the great challenges facing the new state, the most important of which was the bankruptcy of the treasury.

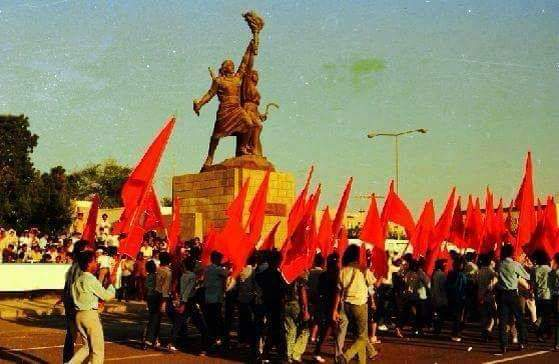
People celebrating the 14th October Revolution next to the "Freedom statue" in al-Oroud Square

Qahtan al-Shaabi dismissed Interior Minister Muhammad Ali Haitham on 16 June 1969, but the latter, with his ties to the tribes and the army, reassembled the leftist forces that had been dispersed by President Qahtan al-Shaabi, and they were able to place him under house arrest on 22 June. A presidential committee was formed from Five people: Salem Rabie Ali, who became president, Muhammad Saleh Al-Awlaki, Ali Antar, Abdel Fattah Ismail, and Muhammad Ali Haitham, who became prime minister. This group took an extreme leftist line, declaring its support for the Palestinians and the Dhofar Revolution, and strengthening its relationship with the Soviet Union. West Germany severed its relationship with the state due to its recognition of East Germany, and the United States also severed its relationship in October 1969. The new powers issued a new constitution, nationalised foreign banks and insurance companies, and changed the name of the country to the People's Democratic Republic of Yemen in line with the Marxist–Leninist approach they followed. A centrally planned economy was established. The port of Aden was the largest source of national income for the Republic of South Yemen, but the closure of the Suez Canal by Egypt between 1967 and 1975 – reduced commercial activities in the port.

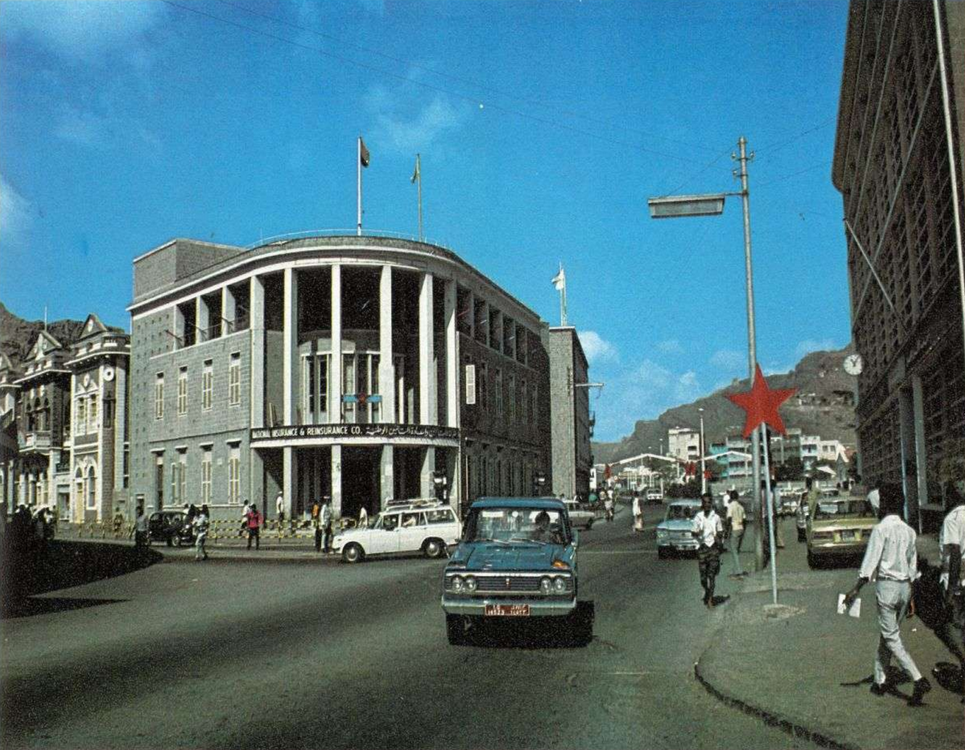
Aden in the late 1970s

Salem Rubaya Ali wanted to adopt a practical approach, so he communicated with the President of North Yemen, Ibrahim al-Hamdi, and made attempts to restore normal relations with Western countries. During his presidency, relations between South Yemen and Saudi Arabia were established in 1976. President Salmin, as he is known, coveted more Soviet support, so the contract with Saudi Arabia worried him. The Soviets pushed them to increase aid, but relations with Saudi Arabia became strained again in 1977 following the assassination of North Yemeni President Ibrahim al-Hamdi. It is believed that Salem Rabie Ali orchestrated the assassination of Ahmed Hussein al-Ghashmi in revenge for Ibrahim al-Hamdi. Salem Rabie Ali was subjected to a quick trial that ended with his execution and Abdel Fattah Ismail assuming the presidency of South Yemen. Relations with North Yemen became tense, due to Fattah's support for the factions opposing Ali Abdullah Saleh, who was more fanatical than his predecessors. Relations with the Soviet Union became active in an unprecedented way, so the Front War broke out in 1978, in which the Soviet Union and the United States intervened.

Ali Nasser Muhammad was able to force Abd al-Fattah Ismail al-Jawfi to resign for "health reasons", and Ismail was exiled to Moscow two years after he assumed the presidency. Despite the approach of the People's Democratic Republic of Yemen and its removal of tribal aspects, tribalism remained alive among politicians and the public despite the exposure of its sheikhs. Tribes from their authorities. Tribal and regional favouritism and nepotism remained rife in southern Yemen, as political forces called on their tribal and regional affiliations during crises.

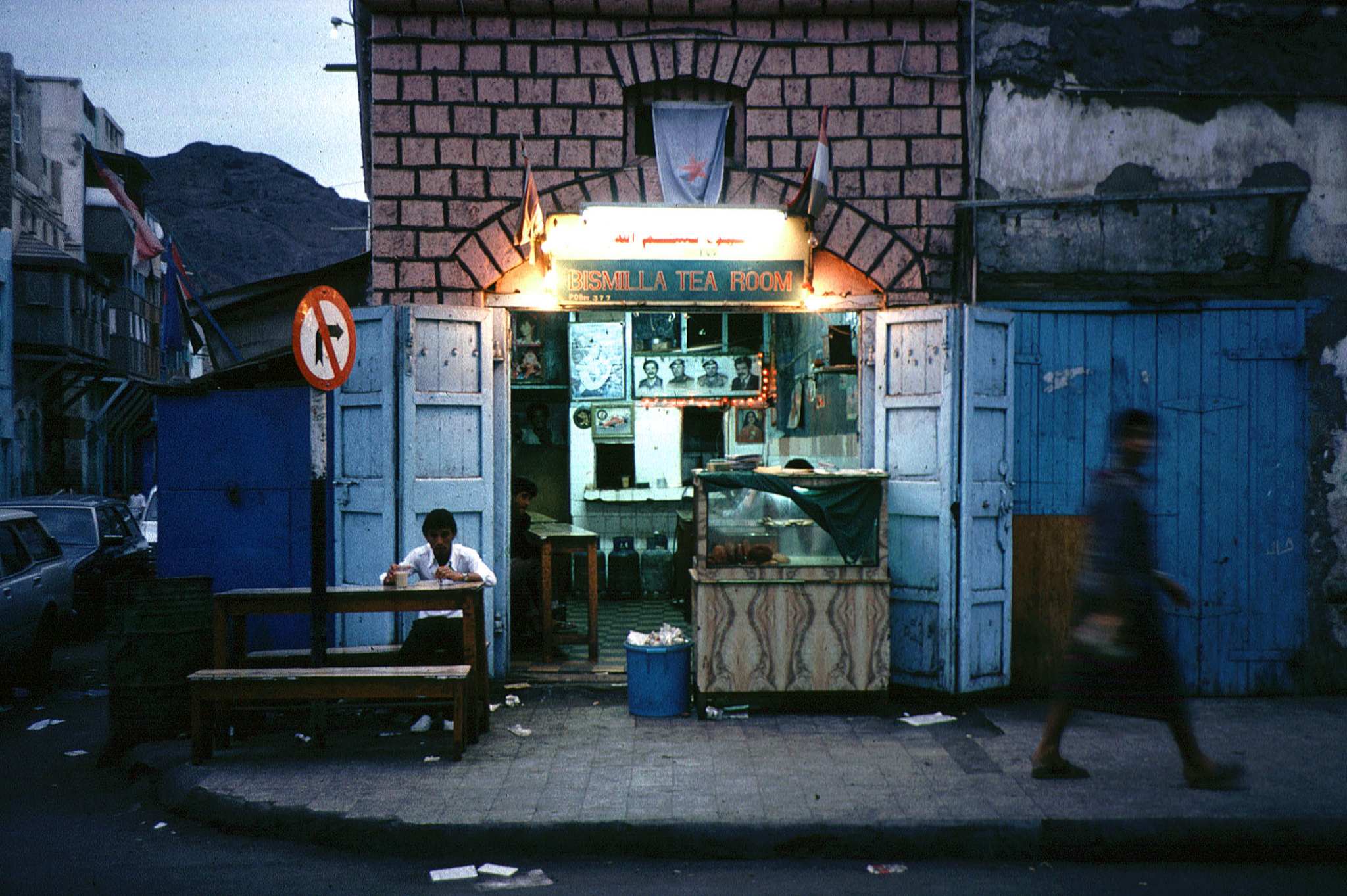
A Maqhaya in Aden with the flag of the ruling Yemeni Socialist Party hanging above it, 1989

By January 1986, Aden was torn apart by the rivalry of two factions in the ruling Socialist Party, when President Ali Nasser Muhammad's guards launched a surprise attack on the political party's office in Aden on 13 January 1986. This was the beginning of the 1986 civil war in South Yemen. The basis of the war was regional. Ali Nasser Muhammad was from Abyan Governorate, while most of those killed in the political party office were from Al-Dhalea and Lahj. Military brigades from those areas bombed Aden from land and sea, forcing Ali Nasser Muhammad to flee and hundreds of thousands of civilians and soldiers to flee to northern Yemen, including Abd Rabbuh Mansour Hadi. This was followed by systematic killings and liquidations against the people of Abyan Governorate, on charges that they were collaborating with Ali Nasser Muhammad. Nearly ten thousand people were killed, and thousands migrated towards North Yemen, most of whom were from Abyan and Shabwa.

With the unification of north and south Yemen in 1990, Aden was no longer a national capital but remained the capital of Aden Governorate which covered an area similar to that of the Aden Colony.

On 29 December 1992, Al Qaeda conducted its first known terrorist attack in Aden, bombing the Gold Mohur Hotel, where US servicemen were known to have been staying en route to Somalia for Operation Restore Hope. A Yemeni and an Austrian tourist died in the attack.

That war marked the end of the state of the People's Democratic Republic of Yemen, and Haider Abu Bakr Al-Attas assumed the presidency until May 22, 1990, the unity of South Yemen with North Yemen, and the establishment of the Republic of Yemen. At that time, Ali Salem al-Beidh was considered Ali Abdullah Saleh's deputy, and Haider Abu Bakr Al-Attas was considered prime minister, and after the 1993 elections. Conflicts began within the ruling coalition, and Vice President Ali Salem Al-Beidh retreated to Aden in August 1993. The general security situation in the country deteriorated, and the complete integration of the two armies failed. The southern forces, which were transferred to Amran, clashed with the northern forces there, and the forces of the northern giants, which were transferred to Amran, clashed. Abyan with the southern forces, and the political parties signed the 1994 Covenant and Agreement, in the Jordanian capital, on February 20, 1994, in an attempt to end the crisis, and successive events led to the outbreak of the Summer 1994 civil war, and the southern military leaders who fled after the events of 1986 joined the ranks of the forces loyal to former President Ali Abdullah Saleh, and supported the Unity Army in the war against their former comrades in 1994 in the war against the separatists. At the forefront of these emerged a group of the brightest officers, such as Abd Rabbuh Mansour Hadi, who became Minister of Defense at the time; the former Chief of Staff, Major General Abdullah Aliwa; and Major General Salem Qatan, who was assassinated by an Al-Qaeda gunman. After the war, Abd Rabbuh Mansour Hadi was appointed Vice President of the Republic, and remained in office. He held his position until 2012, when he was elected president of the country.

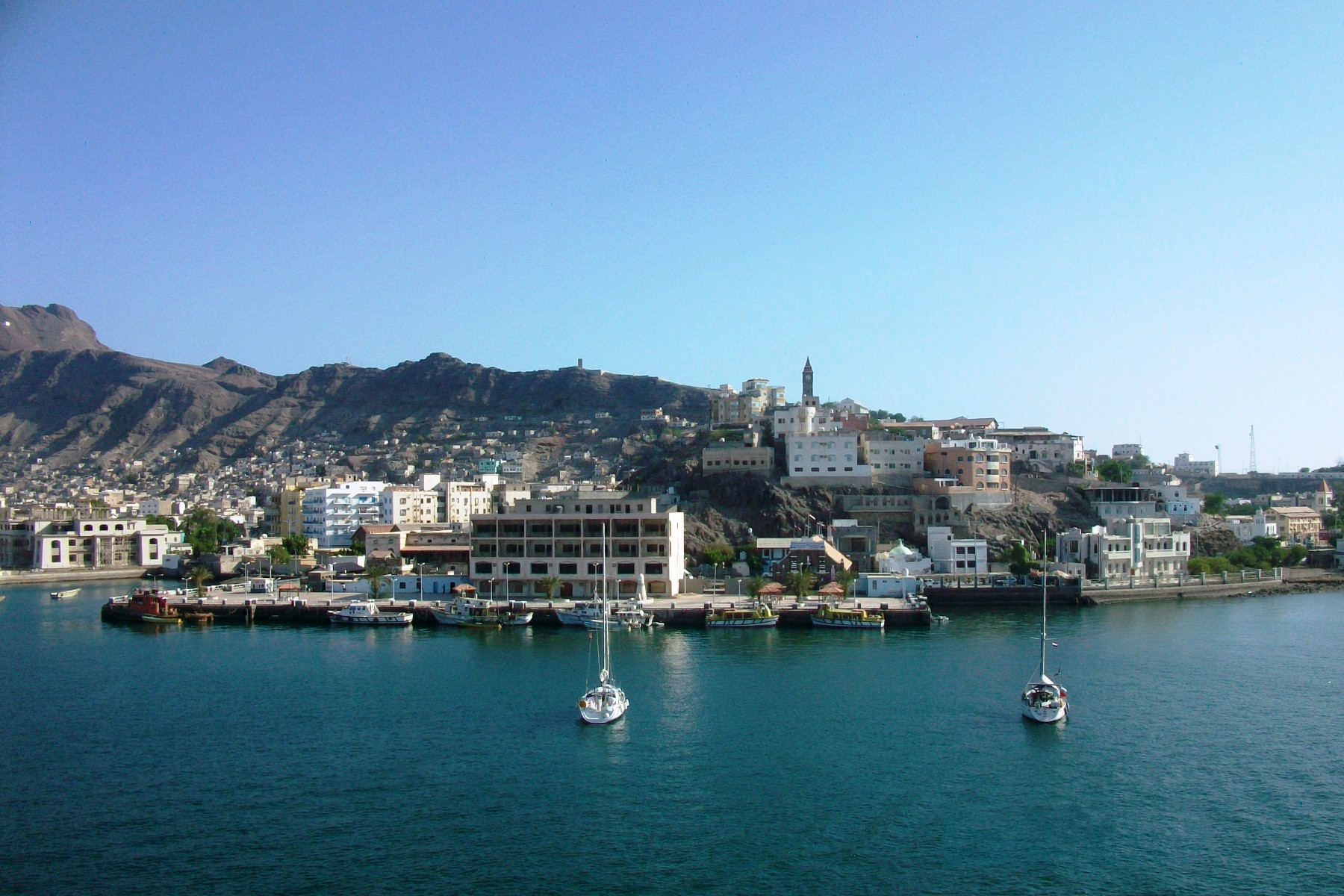
View of Tawahi, Aden, in 2010

Members of al Qaeda attempted to bomb the US guided-missile destroyer The Sullivans at the port of Aden as part of the 2000 millennium attack plots. The boat that had the explosives in it sank, forcing the planned attack to be aborted. The bombing attack on destroyer USS Cole took place in Aden on 12 October 2000.

In 2007 growing dissatisfaction with unification led to the formation of the secessionist South Yemen Movement. According to The New York Times, the Movement's mainly underground leadership includes socialists, Islamists and individuals desiring a return to the perceived benefits of the People's Democratic Republic of Yemen.

=== Temporary capital and civil war ===
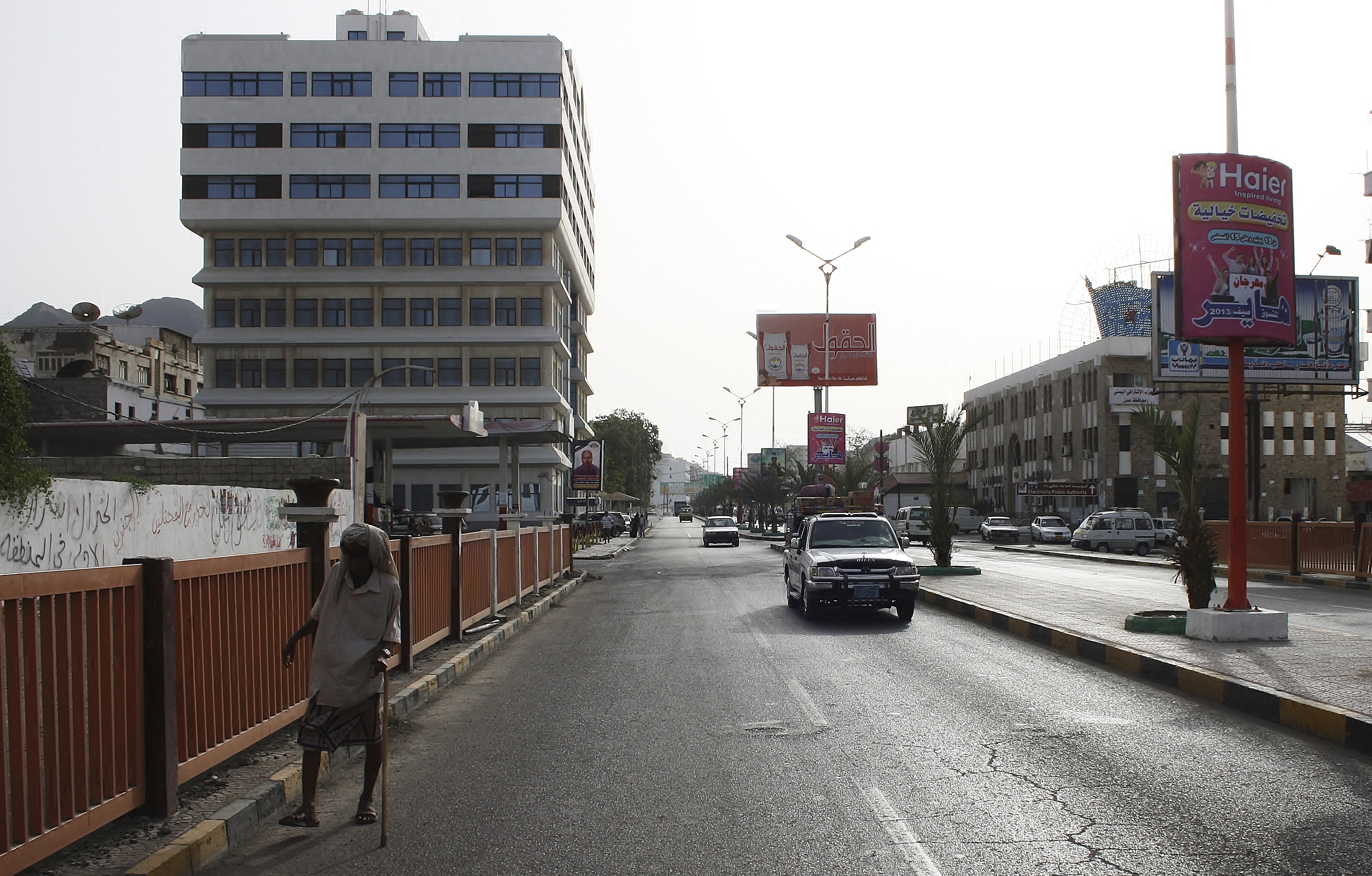
Mualla, Aden, in 2013

Aden remained in a state of political stagnation for 25 years until President Abd Rabbuh Mansour Hadi took refuge there and carried out his work from the Republican Palace in Aden. On 7 March 2015, Hadi declared Aden the temporary capital, instead of Sanaa, which he described as occupied by the Houthis. This was after the Houthis took control of Sanaa on 21 September 2014, and imposed a siege on the Republican Palace and the home of President Hadi on 20 January. On 22 January, Hadi submitted his resignation to Parliament; it did not hold a session to accept or reject the resignation, and Hadi remained under house arrest imposed by the Houthis. Until he was able to leave for Aden on 21 February 2015, he retracted his resignation, and gave a statement in which he said: "All decisions taken since September 21 are invalid and have no legitimacy."

President Abd Rabbuh Mansur Hadi fled to Aden, his hometown, in February 2015 after being deposed in the coup d'état that many consider to be the start of the Yemeni civil war. Others consider that the civil war began in September 2014 when Houthi forces took over the capital city Sanaa, which was followed by a rapid Houthi takeover of the government.

Hadi declared in Aden that he was still Yemen's legitimate president and called on state institutions and loyal officials to relocate to Aden. In a televised speech on 21 March 2015, he declared Aden to be Yemen's "economic and temporary capital" while Sanaa is controlled by the Houthis.

Aden was hit by violence in the aftermath of the coup d'état, with forces loyal to Hadi clashing with those loyal to former president Ali Abdullah Saleh in a battle for Aden International Airport on 19 March 2015. After the airport battle, the entire city became a battleground for the Battle of Aden, which left large parts of the city in ruins and had killed at least 198 people by 25 March 2015.

Some Arab and foreign embassies were transferred to Aden, and Defense Minister Mahmoud Al-Subaihi was able to leave Sanaa for Aden and met with President Hadi. On March 4, 2016, unidentified gunmen stormed the Mother Teresa House in the city and killed sixteen people, including four nuns. A number of the old city's churches have also been destroyed by Islamic extremists since mid-2015.

On 14 July 2015, the Saudi Arabian Army launched an offensive to win control of the city. Within three days, the city was cleared of Houthi rebels, ending the Battle of Aden with a coalition victory.

Beginning on 28 January 2018, separatists loyal to the Southern Transitional Council (STC) seized control of the Yemeni government headquarters in Aden in a coup d'état against the Hadi-led government.

On 30 December 2020, the undersecretary of labour and deputy minister of public works were killed along with between 20 and 30 others at the Aden airport while they conducted an international press briefing about their new arrangements with the STC, which includes the partition of forces inside Aden, as they returned from hiding in the Saudi capital. Prime Minister Maeen Abdulmalik Saeed, his ministers and his entourage were conducted to safety under the barrage of hostile fire.

On 7 January 2026, the Yemeni government forces managed to control Aden following the collapse of the Southern Transitional Council.

== Culture ==
=== Dialects ===
The entry of the Yemenis into Islam contributed to their abandoning their ancient script and replacing it with the late Nabataean alphabet in which the Qur'an was written. (Note: Jawad Ali says: It appears from researchers finding writings written in the Musnad in various places in the Arabian Peninsula, including the coasts of the Arabian Gulf, some of which are ancient and some of which are close to Islam, that the Musnad pen was the authentic and first Arabic pen among the Arabs. All the people of the Arabian Peninsula wrote about it, but the Christian preaching that entered the Arabian Peninsula and spread in various places brought with it the late Armenian pen, the pen of the Eastern churches, and began spreading it among the people. Because it was his sacred pen with which the clerics used to write. Since this pen was easier to write than the musnad, it found widespread followers among those who converted to Christianity and among pagans as well, due to its ease of writing. However, it was not able to eliminate the musnad as people continued to write with it. When Islam came, the scribes wrote the revelation with the pen of the people of Mecca so that the revelation would descend among them. The Mecca pen became the official pen for the Muslims, and Al-Musnad was then sentenced to death. He died and was forgotten by the Arabs, until the Orientalists resurrected him and brought him back to existence again, to translate for us the ordinary writings that were recorded in him. Jawad Ali, Al-Mufassal fi Tarikh al-Arab before Islam, vol. 8, p. 153) Today, Yemenis speak Arabic in the Yemeni dialect, which is a developed dialect and closely linked to the ancient language. It has three dialects with branches: the Sanʽani dialect, the Hadrami dialect, and the Taʽizzi-Adeni dialect, in addition to the Bedouin dialect of the residents of Marib. Al Jawf, Shabwa, and Inner Hadhramaut, and each of these dialects has characteristics and features.

=== Music and poetry ===
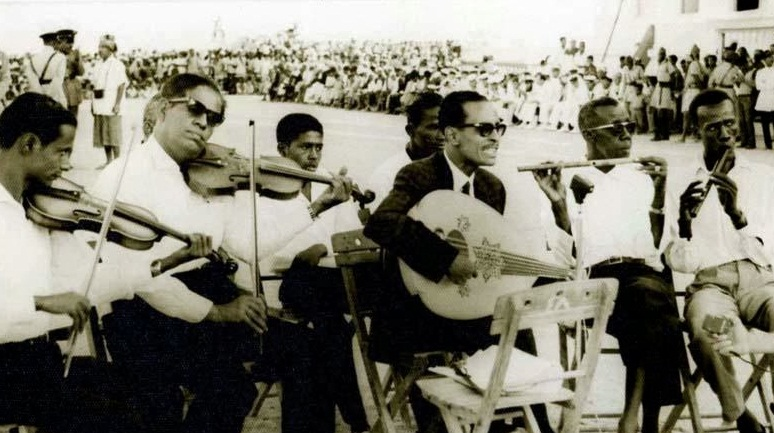
Artist Muhammad Salem bin Shamekh at a popular singing concert in Aden

Adeni art or the Adeniyat is an art of Arabic music. Among the ancient artists of Aden are Iskander Thabet Saleh and Muhammad Murshid Naji, and among the poets are Abdul Rahman Ibrahim Muhammad, Ahmed Ghaleb Muhammad Al-Jabri, Abdullah Abdul Karim Muhammad, Ali Abdullah Jaafar Aman, Farid Muhammad Barakat, Lotfi Jaafar Aman, and Mohsen Ali Brik.

"Adeni music" played a major role in Aden society, and artists in the Aden dialect were called "al-Mutariba", meaning people of music. Adeni music began in 1920 when the army of the Aden Protectorate was formed, and after it the National Guard, where there were teams for those forces and those teams participated On special occasions and weddings.

=== Sports ===
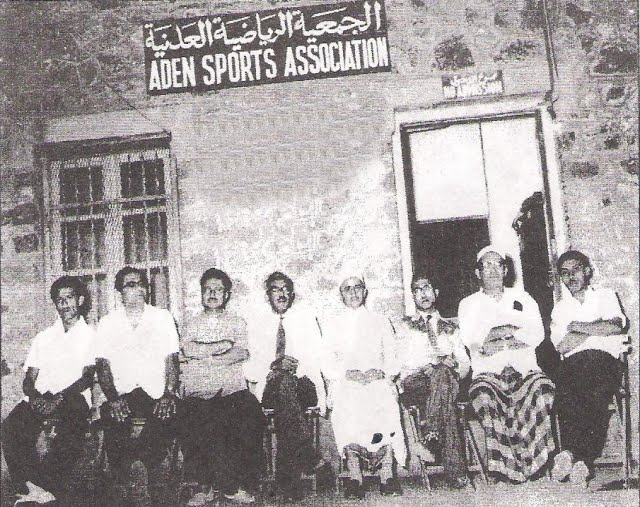
Aden Sports Association

==== Pre-independence ====
The first beginning of Adenian sports dates back to the year 1902, when the Adeni Tennis Club was established, with its headquarters in the Al-Qatee' neighbourhood in Crater, and Youssef Muhammad Khan founded the "Recreational Club United" in the city of Crater, and it was known as the Yousef Khan Stadium. The city of Aden is considered the first city in which sports were practiced in the Arabian Peninsula, and the first private club in Aden was founded in 1905 under the name "Al-Ittihad Al-Muhammadi Club", as the first sports club in Yemen and the Arab world. He was fighting the occupation army divisions and the fleet divisions coming and passing to the port of Aden.

In 1924, the "Al-Husseini Sports Club" was founded in Crater, and a third club appeared in Tawahi under the name "Al-Bamboot Club" and Sheikh Othman. The 1930s witnessed the emergence of a number of clubs. In 1933, the "Nujoom Al-Layl Club", Al-Aidrousi Club, and Nujoom Al-Sabah Club appeared in Crater, and in Tawahi, the "Al-Ittihad Al-Islami Club" (Al-Mawlada) appeared.

Until that year, football matches were played in a friendly manner between the teams of the Crater, Al-Tawahi, and Sheikh Othman regions, as there were no federations regulating sports activity. In 1934, the occupation authority announced the establishment of a sports association called the "Adeniya Sports Association", after the increasing number of local clubs. Its members were appointed by the Governor-General of Aden, and all of its members were English, headed by the English Governor of Aden, Bernard Reilly, as sponsor. The association's board of directors consists of Hikam Bottom as president, the Indian Rosario as secretary, and two other members.

This association began holding the first club tournament, which was the "Rosario Cup Championship". Six clubs participated in the tournament, three from Crater (Al-Ittihad Al-Mohammadi, Al-Husseini, and Nojoom Al-Layl), from Al-Tawahi (Al-Mawalda, and Al-Bamiot), and from Sheikh Othman, Sheikh Othman Club, which includes Players from various small teams in the Sheikh Othman area, and Al-Ittihad Al-Mohammadi Club won this championship.

Among the most important tournaments held in Aden before independence were the Rosario Cup, the Riley Cup, the Somali Bassem Al-Nar Cup, the Aramco Cup, and the Kik Muncherji Championship.

==== Post-independence ====
After independence, the "Football Federation" was established on January 18, 1968, on the ruins of the "Adeniya Sports Association". The Federation took a decision regarding the Adeniya clubs, which had numbered about 64 sports clubs, reducing and merging the clubs in Aden and Lahj to only 16 clubs, and the clubs were forced to join or unite with large teams. In February 1968, several sports clubs were abolished, leaving only 12 clubs remaining. In December 1968, Al-Islah Club and Al-Shaab Club were merged into one club under the name of the latter in Al-Tawahi. In 1969, the Al-Ittihad Al-Muhammadi Club and Al-Tadamon Club were united in Crater, under the name Al-Tadamon Al-Muhammadi Club.

In the "First General Sports Conference" in 1973, the clubs were merged and reduced again, so that their number became only 7 clubs: Al-Ahrar Club, Al-Ahly Club, Shamsan Club, Al-Shaab Club, Al-Hilal Club, United Youth Club, and Aden Tennis Club. On July 18, 1975, the stage of forming urban clubs, and the beginning of the stage of politicisation of the clubs in favour of the National Liberation Front, took place. It was decided to change their names and reduce them to become 5 clubs: Al-Tilal Club, Shamsan Club, Al-Minaa Club, Al-Wahda Club, and Al-Shoula Club.

On July 18, 1975, the "Al-Tilal Sports Club" appeared, headed by Yassin Saeed Noman, as a new name for the "Al-Ittihad Al-Muhammadi Club", which was founded in 1905, and in 1976 the "Yemeni Football Federation" appeared. Al-Tilal Club participated in the "September 26 Cup Competition" in 1980, as the first football competition in which it participated with teams from northern and southern Yemen, such as the national team of Ibb Governorate, Taiz Governorate, Hadhramaut Governorate, Lahj and Hodeidah, at the Shaheed Al-Dharafi Stadium in Sanaa, and Al-Hilal was crowned champion of the September 26 Cup, after victory over Hodeidah national team by five clean goals.

Football is the most popular sport in Aden. There are 9 stadiums in Aden, including the May 22 International Stadium, and 10 sports clubs. In November 2010, Aden hosted the 2010 Arabian Gulf Football Cup.

=== Tourist sites ===
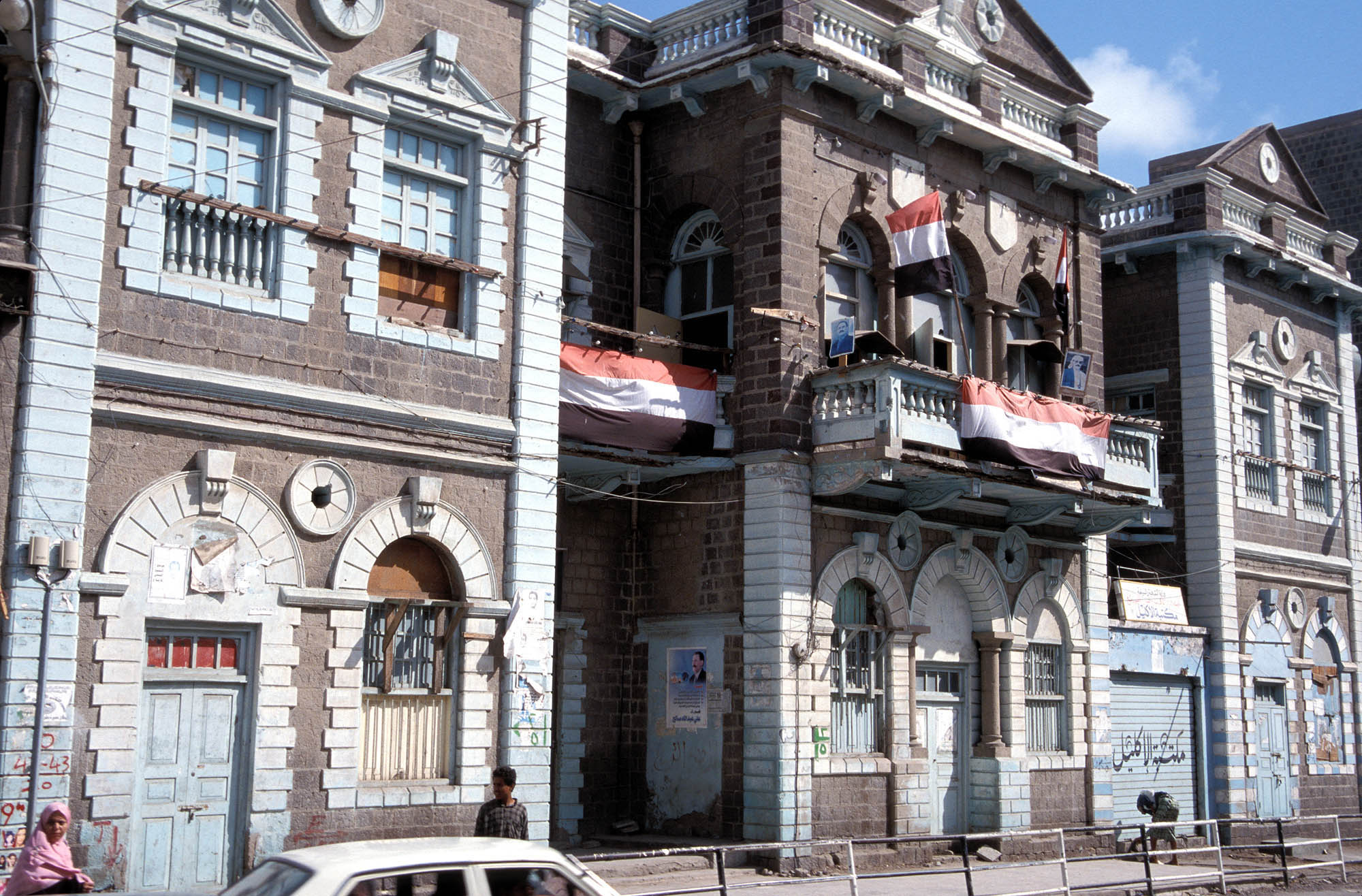
Crown Library of Aden, 1999

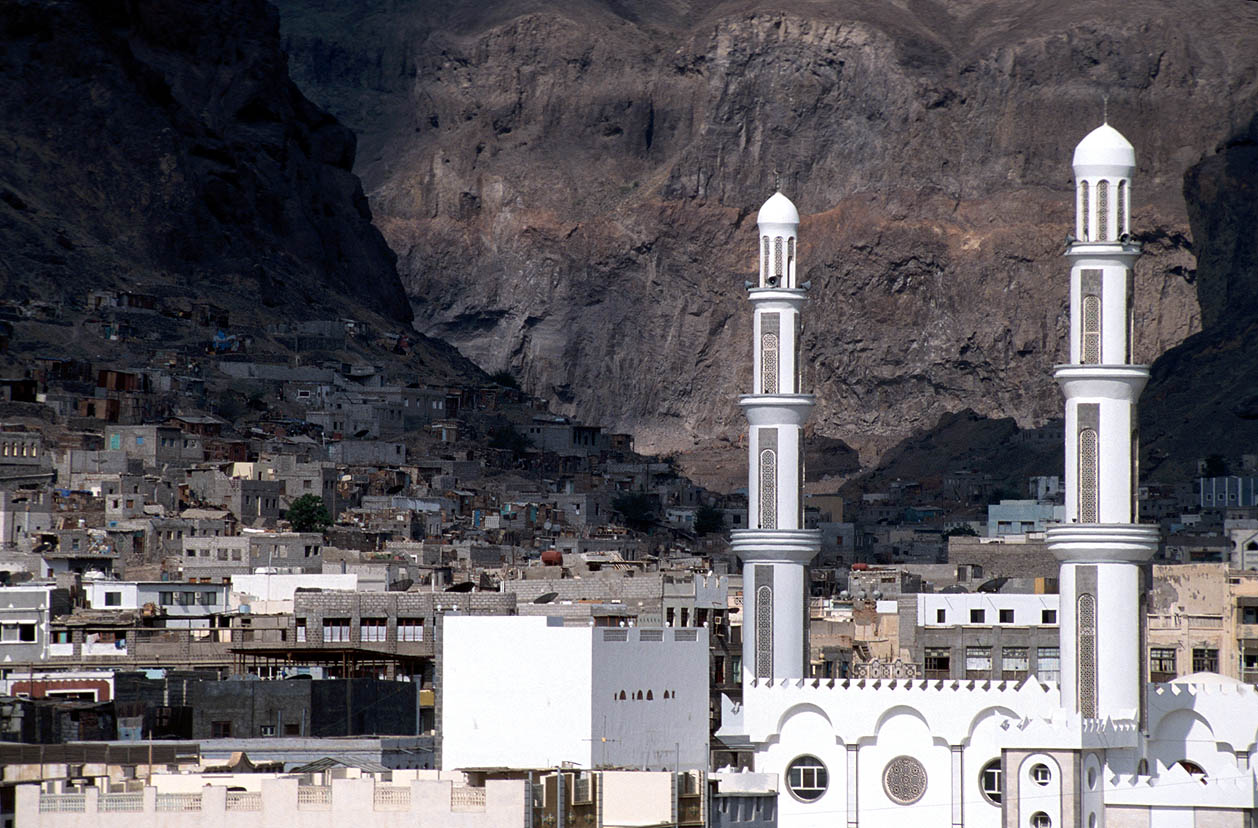
Aban Mosque

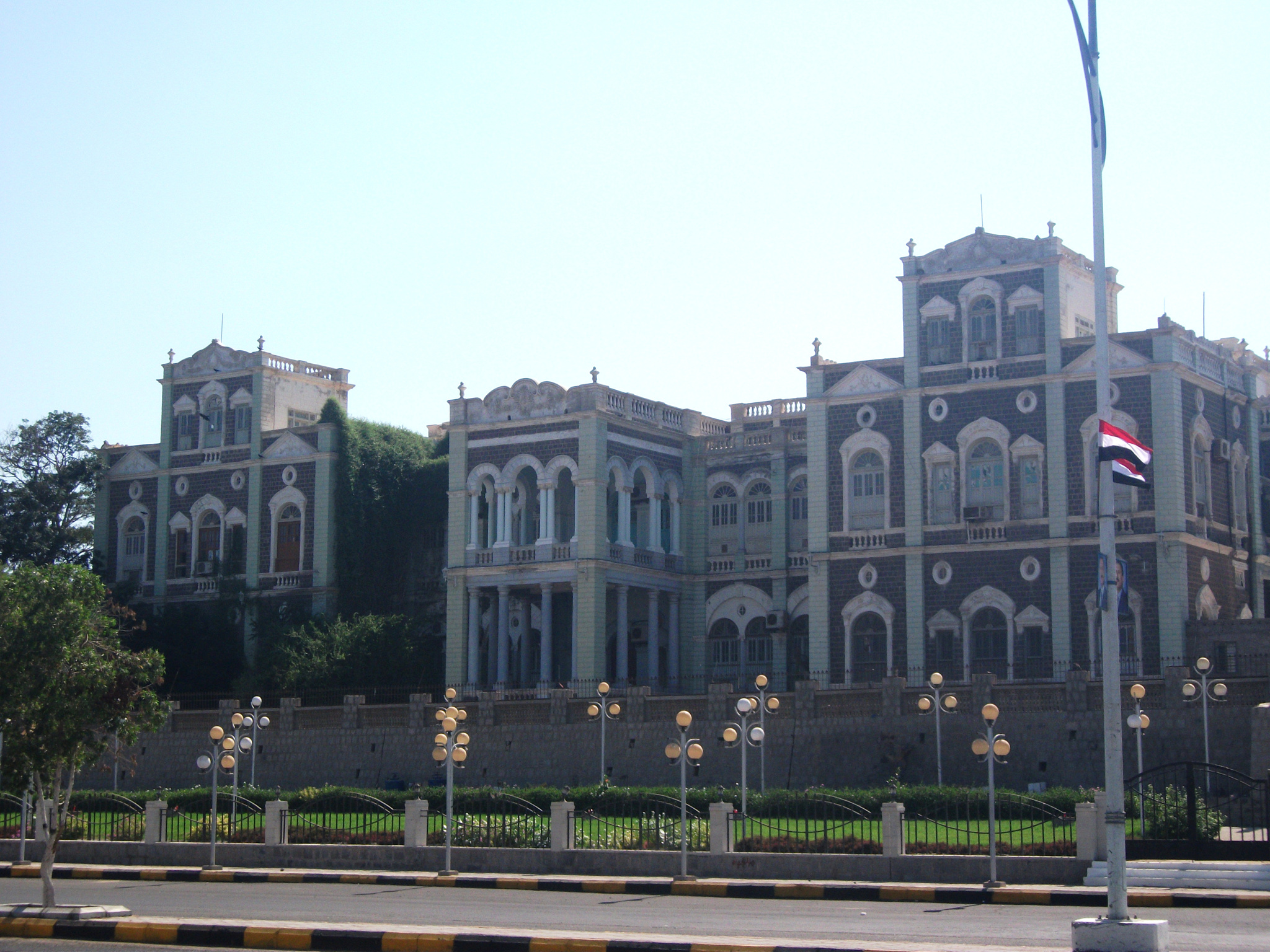
The Palace of the Sultanate of Lahej, now the National Museum of Yemen

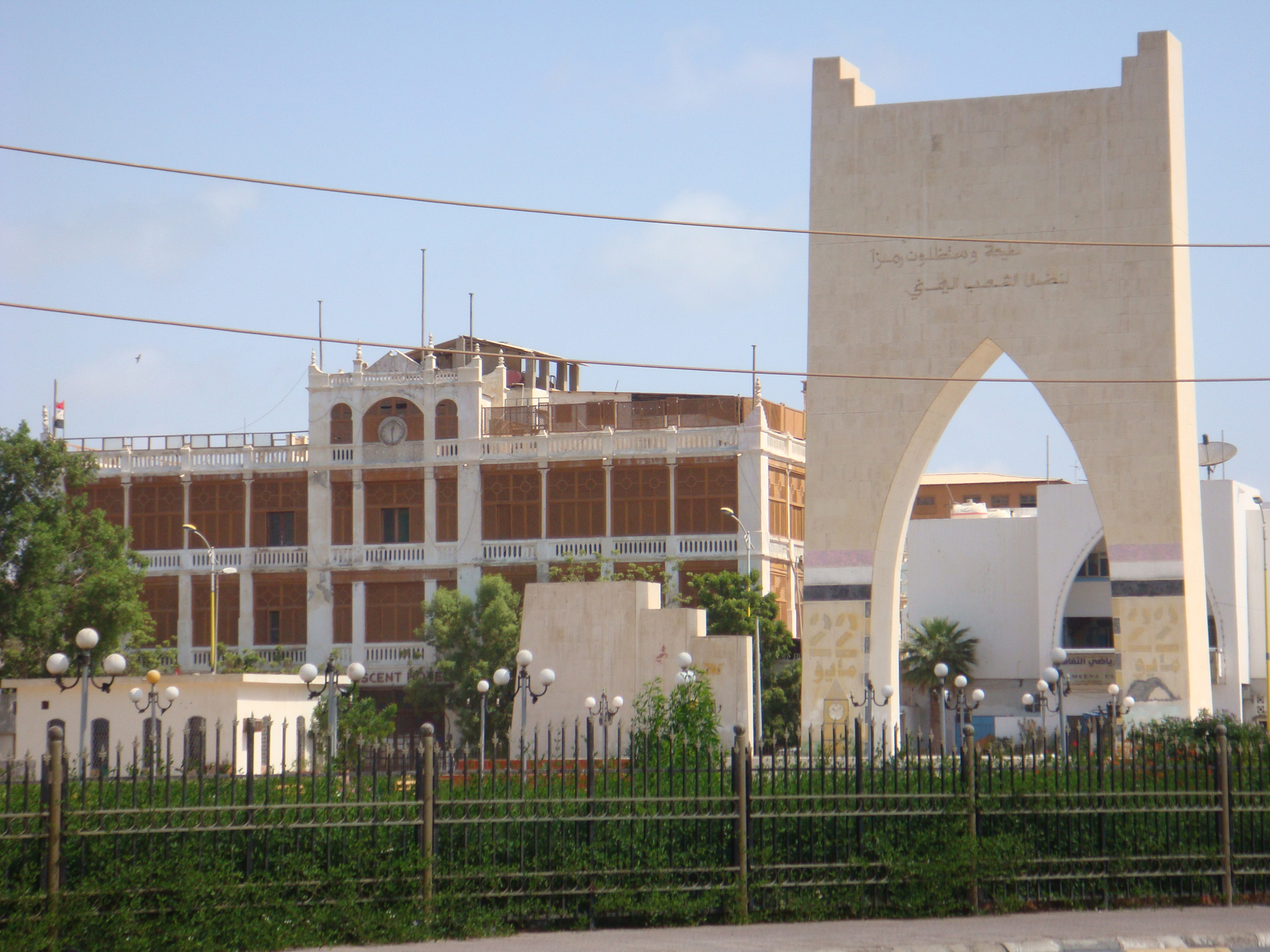
The Crescent Hotel

Aden has several historical and natural sites of interest to visitors. These include:

- The historical British churches, one of which lies empty and semi-derelict in 2019.
- The Zoroastrian Temple
- The Cisterns of Tawila—an ancient water-catchment system located in the sub-centre of Crater
- Sira Fortress
- The Aden Minaret
- Little Ben, a miniature Big Ben Clock Tower overlooking Steamer Point. Built during the colonial period, this was restored in 2012 after 3 decades of neglect since the British withdrawal of 1967.
- The Landing Pier at Steamer Point is a 19th-century building used by visiting dignitaries during the colonial period, most notably Queen Elizabeth during her 1954 visit to the colony. This building was hit by an airstrike in 2015 and is currently in the process of being restored in 2019.
- The Crescent Hotel which contained a number of artifacts relating to the Royal Visit of 1954 and which currently remains derelict as a result of a recent airstrike.
- The Palace of the Sultanate of Lahej/National Museum—The National Museum was founded in 1966 and is located in what used to be the Palace of the Sultanate of Lahej. Northern forces robbed it during the 1994 Civil War, but its collection of pieces remains one of the biggest in Yemen.
- The Aden Military Museum which features a painting depicting the 20 June 1967 ambush by Arab Police Barracks on a British Army unit when a number of the 22 soldiers killed that day were driving in two Land Rovers on Queen Arwa Road, Crater.
- The Rimbaud House, which opened in 1991, is the two-story house of French poet Arthur Rimbaud who lived in Aden from 1880 to 1891. Rimbaud moved to Aden on his way to Ethiopia in an attempt for a new life. As of the late 1990s, the first floor of the house belonged to the French Consulate, a cultural centre and a library. The house is located in al-Tawahi—the European Quarter of Aden—and is politically and culturally debated for its French nature in an area previously colonised by Britain.
- The fortifications of Jebal Hadid and Jebal Shamsan
- The beaches of Aden and Little Aden—Some of the popular beaches in Aden consist of Lover's Bay Beach, Elephant Beach and Gold Beach. The popular beach in Little Aden is called Blue Beach. Some beaches are private and some are public, which is subject to change over time due to the changing resort industry. According to the Wall Street Journal, kidnappings on the beaches and the threat of Al Qaeda has caused problems for the resort industry in Aden, which used to be popular among locals and Westerners.
- Al-Aidaroos Mosque
- Main Pass – now called Al-Aqba Road is the only road into Aden through Crater. Originally an Arched Upper bridge known as Main Gate, it overlooked Aden city and was built during the Ottoman Empire. A painted crest of the 24th British army battalion is still visible on the brickwork adjacent to the Gate site and is believed to be the only remaining army Crest from colonial rule still visible in Aden. In March 1963 the bridge was removed by a British Army controlled explosion to widen the 2 lane roadway to the present 4 lane highway and the only reminder of this bridge is a quarter scale replica built at the end of the Al-Aqba road intersection known as the AdenGate Model roundabout.

== Economy and transportation ==
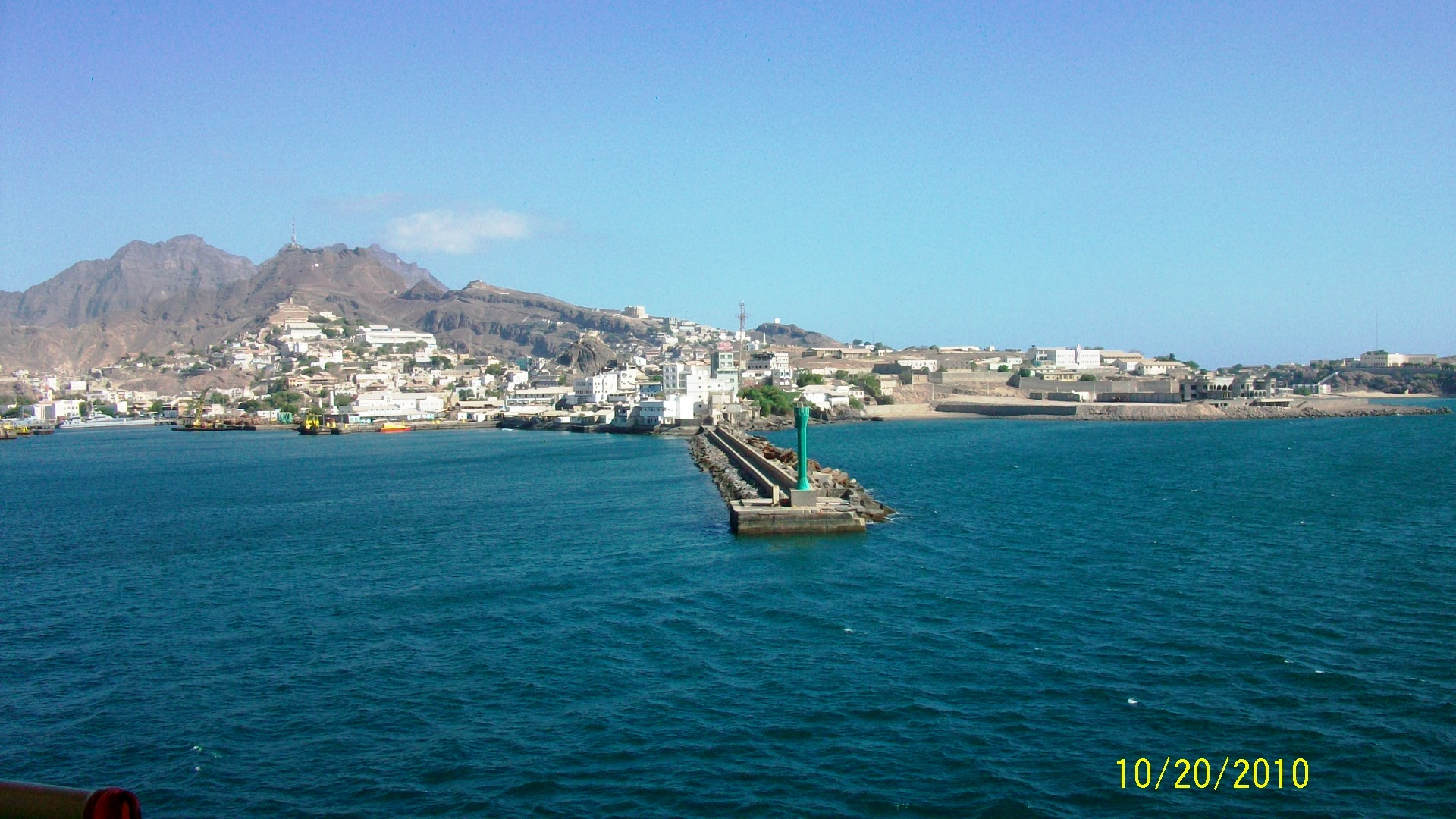
A small green lighthouse in the port of Aden, and there is another white lighthouse (Aden Lighthouse).

The industrial activity in Aden is represented by a group of factories and production units, the forefront of which is the oil refinery. The oil refinery in Aden is considered one of the first refineries to be established in the region, and began operating in 1954 AD. The Aden Refineries Company has facilities such as an oil tanker port, a network of storage tanks, and a centre to supply ships with fuel.

Historically, Aden was a station for importing goods from the African coast and from Europe, the United States, and India. As of 1920, Aden was a major commercial centre for trade in the Arabian Peninsula, and the port exported small quantities of local products to most Arab ports. Aden provided coal and salt to passing ships, and the port was a stopping point for ships when they entered Bab al-Mandab.

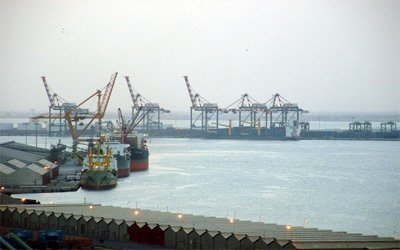
Port of Aden

=== Transport ===
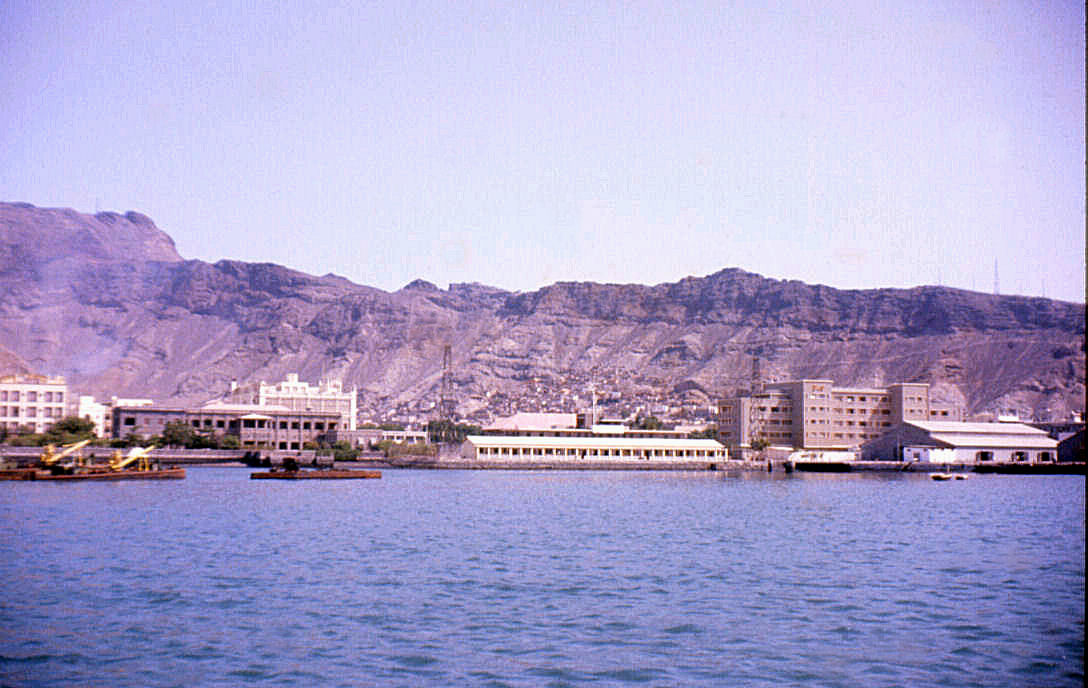
Aden's harbour in 1960

Historically, the port of Aden was the main transport port in the region. Passenger ships land in Al-Tawahi District, and the city is served by Aden International Airport, which is about 10 kilometres (6 mi) from the city. The airport is the main headquarters of Al-Saeeda Airlines and its operations centre. The airport is considered the second largest airport. In Yemen, after Sanaa International Airport, it is considered the best airport in Yemen in terms of location due to the mountainous nature of Yemen. However, this airport is surrounded by the Arabian Sea in terms of take-off and landing. The establishment of Aden Airport dates back to the year 1927 when the British forces established a military airport in the district. Khor Maksar. After World War II, Britain carried out extensive urban modernisation and built Aden International Airport, known today, next to the military airport. Alyemda Airlines was the official carrier of South Yemen, before unification, and was based in Aden, before merging with Yemen Airways in 1996. Before the Battle of Aden Airport and the 2015 military intervention in Yemen closed this airport along with other airports in Yemen. On 22 July, Aden International Airport was declared fit for operation again after the Houthi forces were driven from the city, and a Saudi plane carrying aid reportedly became the first plane to land in Aden in four months. The same day, a ship chartered by the World Food Programme carrying fuel docked in Aden's port.

Historically, Aden's harbour has been a major hub of transportation for the region. As of 1920, the harbour was 13 by 6 km (8 by 4 mi) in size. Passenger ships landed at Steamer Point now called Tawahi.

During the British colonial period motor vehicles drove on the left, as in the United Kingdom. On 2 January 1977, Aden, along with the rest of South Yemen, changed to driving on the right, bringing it into line with neighbouring Arab states.

During the early 20th century, Aden was a prominent export centre for coffee grown in the Jubail highlands. And also to export frankincense, wheat, barley, alfalfa and millet, which are produced and exported from Aden. The leaves and stems of clover, millet, and corn produced in Aden were generally used as fodder. Beginning in 1920, Aden was desalinating seawater to produce table salt. Between 1916 and 1917, Aden produced more than 120,000 tons of salt. Aden also produced potash, which was exported to Mumbai.

=== Economy ===
Historically, Aden would import goods from the African coast and from Europe, the United States, and India. As of 1920, the British described it as "the chief emporium of Arabian trade, receiving the small quantities of native produce, and supplying the modest wants of the interior and of most of the smaller Arabian ports." At the docks, the city provided coal to passing ships. The only item being produced by the city, as of 1920, was salt. Also, the port was the stop ships had to take when entering the Bab-el-Mandeb; this was how cities like Mecca had received goods by ship. Yemen Airlines, the national airline of South Yemen, had its head office in Aden. On 15 May 1996, Yemen Airlines merged with Yemenia.

During the early 20th century Aden was a notable centre of coffee production. Women processed coffee beans, grown in the Yemen highlands. Frankincense, wheat, barley, alfalfa, and millet was also produced and exported from Aden. The leaves and stalks of the alfalfa, millet and maize produced in Aden were generally used as fodder. As of 1920, Aden was also gathering salt from salt water. An Italian company called Agostino Burgarella Ajola and Company gathered and process the salt under the name Aden Salt Works. There was also a smaller company from India, called Abdullabhoy and Joomabhoy Lalji & Company that owned a salt production firm in Aden. Both companies exported the salt. Between 1916 and 1917, Aden produced over 120,000 tons of salt. Aden has also produced potash, which was generally exported to Mumbai.

Aden produced jollyboats. Charcoal was produced as well, from acacia, and mainly in the interior of the region. Cigarettes were produced by Jewish and Greek populations in Aden. The tobacco used was imported from Egypt.

Since the outbreak of the Yemeni Civil War spread to Aden in 2015, the city has been struck by constant protests over a range of issues, but especially concerning electricity generation. Aden's power grid is composed solely of diesel generators and is thus heavily dependent on imported fuel. The main power plant is al-Hasswa diesel power plant, which in June 2021 had only two turbines out of five running, producing up to 50 megawatts (MW) of power in a region where the deficit hovers around 300 MW. Nawfal al-Mojamal, the plant director, said "In its 35 years of existence, al-Hasswa station never had any kind of maintenance, except in 2016 ... when the two turbines were restored". This electricity shortage led to the development of Yemen's first large-scale solar power plant servicing Aden with a 120 MW capacity, opened in July 2024.

=== Free zone ===
The free zone, which was opened in 1991, represents Yemen's economic gateway and the meeting point of the continents of Asia and Africa. The free zone gains its strategic importance from the special location of the port of Aden, as it is located directly on the main trade route around the world and from the Middle East to Europe and America, and is distinguished by the possibility of providing transit services. To East Africa, the Red Sea, the Indian subcontinent and the Arabian Gulf. The free zone represents a storage and distribution area suitable for Africa, the Red Sea and the Arabian Gulf.

== Geography ==
Aden's location in Yemen

Aden is located on the coast of the Gulf of Aden, and is about 363 kilometres from the capital, Sanaa. It is located between latitudes 47 and 12 north of the equator, and at an altitude of 6 metres above sea level. It is surrounded by Lahj Governorate to the north and east, and the Governorate of Abyan is to the northwest. Aden has an airport (Aden International Airport), a seaport (the port of Aden), and has land routes from the north linking it to Hajj, Abyan and Taiz.

=== Landforms ===
Aden is a coastal city; it overlooks the Gulf of Aden, which opens to the Indian Ocean. The shape of the city of Aden in the form of two peninsulas helped this factor to make the city of Aden unique in this particularity, which clearly affected the occurrence of the phenomenon of land and sea breezes. Which occurs due to air exchange between land and water during the day and night. Its location on the water surface also affects the daily and annual temperature range. This does not mean that there are no significant differences in temperatures in summer and winter.

The surface of the city of Aden slopes south, and the highlands appear in the southern part of Aden, represented by the highlands of Jabal Shamsan, whose highest peaks exceed 500 metres, and the highlands of Jabal Ihsan and Jabal Al-Muzalqim in Little Aden, which are lower in height than Jabal Shamsan, and the highlands of Aden do not differ from the rest of the highlands of Yemen in terms of In terms of composition, it is of volcanic origin, and although the mountain highlands occupy large areas of the city, their influence is weak and limited on the climate of the city of Aden.

=== Climate ===
Aden has a hot desert climate (BWh) in the Köppen-Geiger climate classification system. Although Aden sees next-to-no precipitation year-round, it is humid throughout the year.

Climate data for Aden
| Month | Jan | Feb | Mar | Apr | May | Jun | Jul | Aug | Sep | Oct | Nov | Dec | Year |
|---|---|---|---|---|---|---|---|---|---|---|---|---|---|
| Record high °C (°F) | 31.1 (88.0) | 31.7 (89.1) | 35.0 (95.0) | 37.8 (100.0) | 41.1 (106.0) | 41.1 (106.0) | 41.1 (106.0) | 42.8 (109.0) | 38.3 (100.9) | 38.9 (102.0) | 35.0 (95.0) | 32.8 (91.0) | 42.8 (109.0) |
| Mean daily maximum °C (°F) | 28.5 (83.3) | 28.6 (83.5) | 30.2 (86.4) | 32.2 (90.0) | 34.1 (93.4) | 36.6 (97.9) | 35.9 (96.6) | 35.3 (95.5) | 35.4 (95.7) | 33.0 (91.4) | 30.7 (87.3) | 28.9 (84.0) | 32.4 (90.3) |
| Daily mean °C (°F) | 25.7 (78.3) | 26.0 (78.8) | 27.2 (81.0) | 28.9 (84.0) | 31.0 (87.8) | 32.7 (90.9) | 32.1 (89.8) | 31.5 (88.7) | 31.6 (88.9) | 28.9 (84.0) | 27.1 (80.8) | 26.0 (78.8) | 29.1 (84.4) |
| Mean daily minimum °C (°F) | 22.6 (72.7) | 23.2 (73.8) | 24.0 (75.2) | 25.6 (78.1) | 27.7 (81.9) | 28.8 (83.8) | 28.0 (82.4) | 27.5 (81.5) | 27.8 (82.0) | 24.6 (76.3) | 23.2 (73.8) | 22.9 (73.2) | 25.5 (77.9) |
| Record low °C (°F) | 15.6 (60.1) | 17.2 (63.0) | 18.9 (66.0) | 18.9 (66.0) | 21.1 (70.0) | 23.9 (75.0) | 22.8 (73.0) | 23.3 (73.9) | 25.0 (77.0) | 18.9 (66.0) | 18.3 (64.9) | 16.7 (62.1) | 15.6 (60.1) |
| Average precipitation mm (inches) | 6 (0.2) | 3 (0.1) | 5 (0.2) | 2 (0.1) | 1 (0.0) | 0 (0) | 3 (0.1) | 3 (0.1) | 5 (0.2) | 1 (0.0) | 3 (0.1) | 5 (0.2) | 36 (1.4) |
| Average precipitation days (≥ 0.1 mm) | 3 | 2 | 2 | 2 | 1 | 1 | 2 | 2 | 1 | 1 | 1 | 3 | 20 |
| Average relative humidity (%) | 72 | 72 | 74 | 74 | 72 | 66 | 65 | 65 | 69 | 68 | 70 | 70 | 70 |
| Mean monthly sunshine hours | 241.8 | 203.4 | 217.0 | 240.0 | 303.8 | 282.0 | 241.8 | 269.7 | 270.0 | 294.5 | 285.0 | 257.3 | 3,106.3 |
| Mean daily sunshine hours | 7.8 | 7.2 | 7.0 | 8.0 | 9.8 | 9.4 | 7.8 | 8.7 | 9.0 | 9.5 | 9.5 | 8.3 | 8.5 |
Source: Deutscher Wetterdienst

Aden mean sea temperature
| Jan | Feb | Mar | Apr | May | Jun | Jul | Aug | Sep | Oct | Nov | Dec |
|---|---|---|---|---|---|---|---|---|---|---|---|
| 25 °C (77 °F) | 25 °C (77 °F) | 26 °C (79 °F) | 27 °C (81 °F) | 29 °C (84 °F) | 30 °C (86 °F) | 29 °C (84 °F) | 29 °C (84 °F) | 30 °C (86 °F) | 28 °C (82 °F) | 27 °C (81 °F) | 25 °C (77 °F) |

== Environment ==
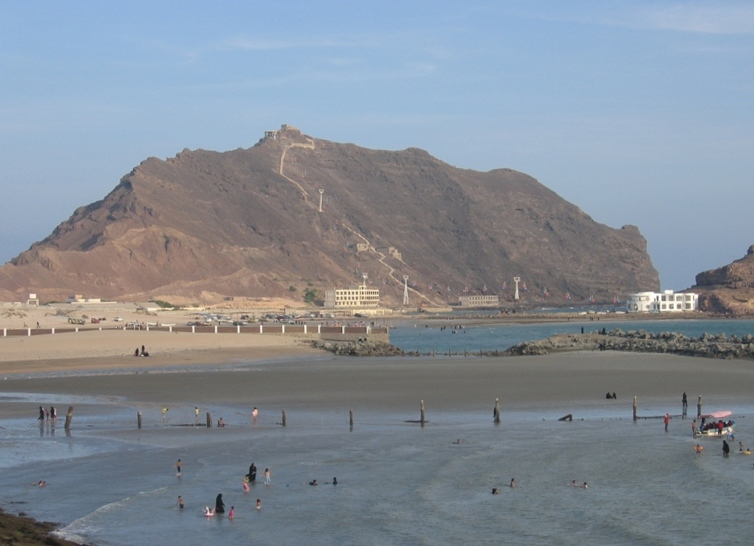
Shores of Aden

=== Coasts ===
Most of the coasts of Aden Governorate along the coastal strip are sandy coasts, and the governorate has coastal beaches, including the Golden Coast in Al-Tawahi District, the coast of Abyan Bakhour Maksar, Al-Ghadeer Beach, and Kud Al-Nimr Beach in Buraiqa.

=== Offshore islands ===
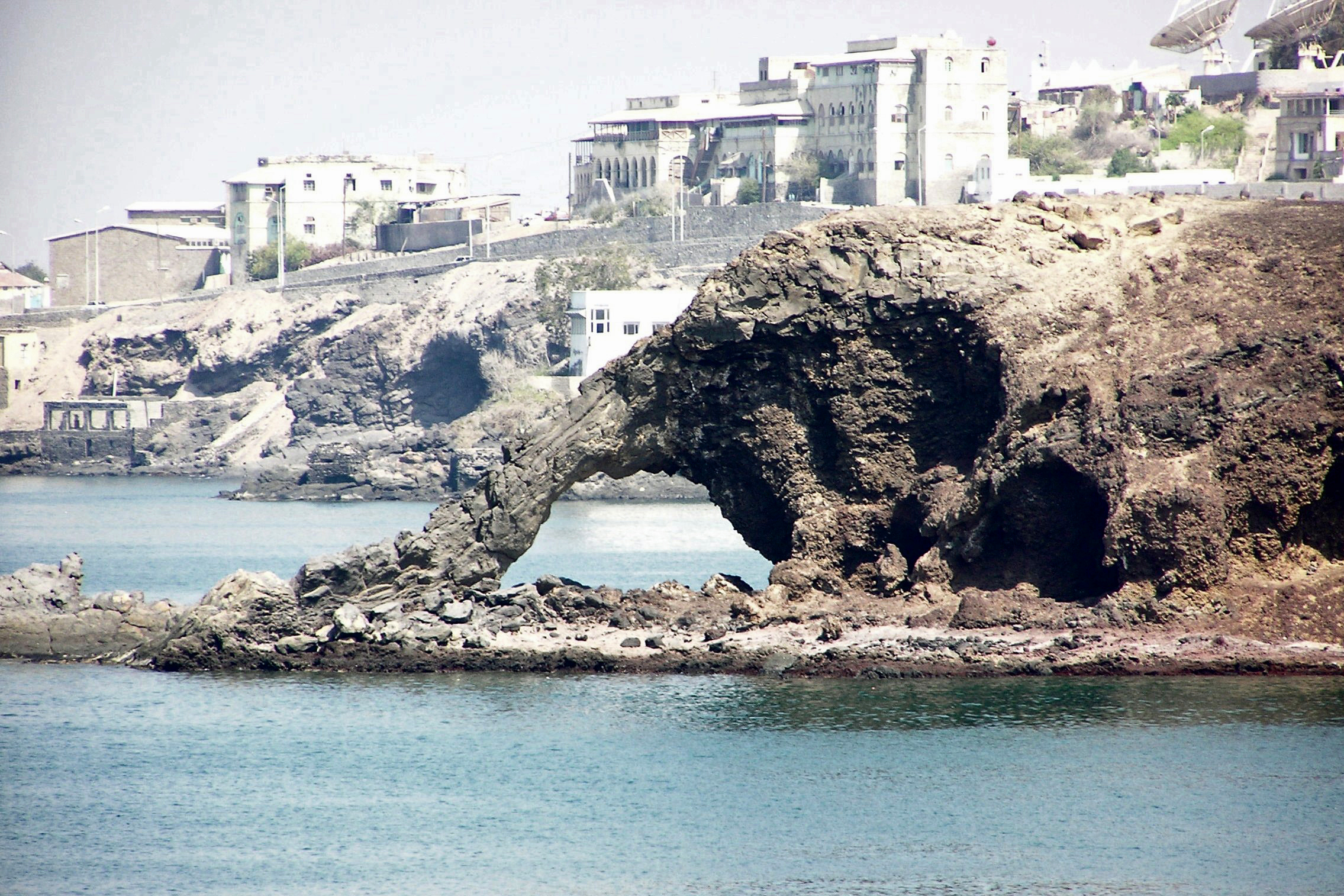
Khartoum al Feel (Arabic: خرطوم الفيل, lit. 'Elephant's trunk') in the Gold Moor beach of Aden

There are about 21 islands around the peninsulas of Aden, Aden Lesser, and Ras Amran. They are mostly rocky islands, some of which are surrounded by incomplete coral reefs, and most of them are considered fishing areas. A number of islands have many activities, especially on Al-Ummal Island and Sirah Island.

=== Wild and domestic animal diversity ===
Yemen is considered one of the countries rich in bird species in the Middle East due to the availability of many suitable coastal environments that helped attract many migratory birds to wetland sites, coasts and islands. The Aden region (Khor Maksar – Al-Haswah) was registered on the list of important areas of the World Bird Organization as a habitat. The last three species that are globally threatened with extinction are: the great eagle, the gull eagle, and the eastern king eagle.

There are dozens of bird species recorded in the wetlands of Aden and the Caltex swamp area, which are rich in a wide variety of endemic and migratory birds, including birds that are present throughout the year. There are many birds in the area, including great flamingos, dwarf flamingos, and rock egrets. And the spoonbill, the hooked tern and the seagull.

== Public services ==
=== Education ===
There are 95 schools in Aden, including 13 kindergartens, and 82 basic education schools, including 29 schools for boys, 29 schools for girls, and 29 joint schools for boys and girls. There are also 29 secondary schools, including 15 schools for boys and 14 schools for girls, all of which are in a double shift system. Until 2004, the number of male students reached In basic education, there were 57,941 students and 48,081 female students, with a total of 104,622 students. In secondary education, the number of male students reached 11,029 students, and 9,643 female students.

As for vocational, technical and vocational education centres and institutes, their number is 13, with 2,214 students enrolled, including 453 teachers. The health institutes have one institute, with 864 students enrolled, including 147 teachers, according to 2010 statistics. As for higher education, there is one government university in Aden, which is the University of Aden, which has 9 colleges. More than 29 thousand students are enrolled, according to 2010 statistics.

=== Health ===
There are 15 hospitals in the economic capital, Aden, including 5 public government hospitals, 6 belonging to the private sector, and 37 health centres. There are 34 facilities in the city that provide maternity and childhood services, and the number of specialised workforce in health facilities is 2,825 specialists.

==== Endemic areas ====
In June 2015, the International Red Cross team present in conflict areas in Yemen during the events of the Yemeni civil war announced that the cities of Crater, Al-Mualla, Khor Maksar and Al-Tawahi in the Aden Governorate in the south of the country were areas affected by dengue fever. The health authorities in Aden said that this fever had spread remarkably and widely. Since the beginning of May, health services have deteriorated and infrastructure facilities, such as electricity, water, and sanitation, have been damaged as a result of the ongoing fighting in the city for months.

=== Mail ===
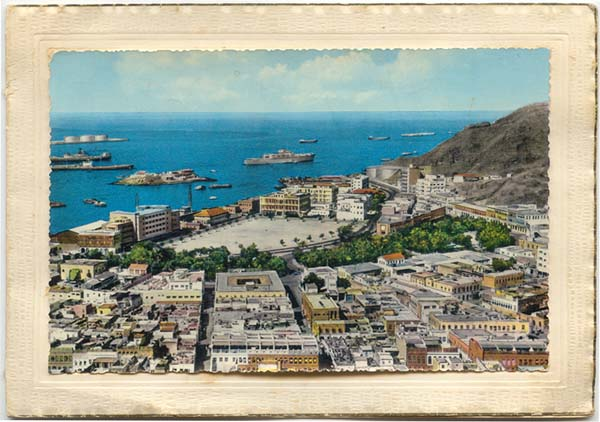
A postcard of Tawahi in 1961 during the British occupation

Aden has known mail since June 15, 1839, that is, a year after the British occupation, although the official post office was not inaugurated until 1857. Postage stamps of both Britain and India were used in Aden until it became called the Aden Colony on April 1, 1937, although the stamps of this stage It bears no distinctive sign, but the use of the number 124 as a postal code is attributed to Aden as part of the Indian postal numerical system.

Then, when it became a colony in 1937, it had sets of postage stamps containing pictures and the name Aden printed on them. In 1939, a new postage set was issued containing a picture of King George VI, but the Sultans of Hadhramaut – who were under the umbrella of the Aden Protectorate – controlled Britain has had it since the 1880s – they refused to do so, and so Britain issued a separate postal set in 1942, but this time with the inclusion of a phrase and pictures expressing the Kathiri Sultanate in Sayun and the Qu'aiti Sultanate in Shihr and Mukalla, in addition to pictures of the sultans.

== Media ==
=== Journalism ===
Brigadier General Muhammad Bashraheel

The weekly Al-Amal newspaper was founded in 1957 in Aden. Its slogan was "Freedom, Bread, and Peace". The British authorities allowed only 1,500 copies to be printed weekly, and the newspaper was banned shortly afterward.

In 1958, Al-Ayyam, an independent daily newspaper in the Arabic language, was established in Aden during the British occupation. The first issue was published on 30 July 1958, and its founder and editor-in-chief was Brigadier General Muhammad Ali Bashraheel. It stopped publishing after independence during the era of the People's Democratic Republic of Yemen, and then resumed publication. After achieving Yemeni unity, the first issue of the second edition was on 7 November 1990, after a hiatus that lasted more than 23 years. In 1998, Al-Ayyam was the first newspaper in Yemen to be prosecuted by the government under a criminal law. Other cases followed until it became public by the end of the year. 2008, responsible for 73% of the total number of cases filed by the Ministry of Information and the Yemeni government against the press in Yemen. When the protests and clashes intensified in Aden in April 2009, "Al-Ayyam covered the events extensively, and pictures of blood and injuries were on the cover of the newspaper for days." President Ali Abdullah Saleh sent delegations to the newspaper, asking them to reduce the severity of their coverage, and to stop using pictures of the injured. On 12 May 2009, security forces launched an attack on the headquarters of Al-Ayyam newspaper in Aden.

=== Radio and television ===
Radio Aden was established on 17 August 1954, under the name "Aden Radio Station". It is currently broadcast in two periods, morning and evening. The British occupation opened the Aden Channel on 11 September 1964, following the revolution of 14 October 1963. Television transmission was limited to covering populated neighbourhoods in the city of Aden, especially where soldiers and families of the British forces were present. In January 1979, the television headquarters moved to the "Radio and Television Building" in Tawahi; at that time broadcasts were in black-and-white. In March 1981 the gradual transition to colour broadcasting began, and in June 1981 the channel began broadcasting via satellite. After the Yemeni unification on 22 May 1990, Aden Channel was the second official channel of Yemeni TV.

== Notable people ==
- Sabah al-Alwani — first woman member of Yemen's Supreme Judicial Council
- Mukesh Ambani (born 1957) — businessman and currently the richest person in Asia
- Amr Gamal (born 1983) — film and theatre director, producer, and writer
- Eddie Izzard (born 1962) — comedian
- Shafiqa Zawqari (born 1942) — author
- Barry Stewart Hunter (born 1973) — author (born in Aden)

== See also ==
- Hadhramaut Mountains
- History of the Jews in Aden
- Military history of Britain
- Postage stamps and postal history of Aden
- Yemen Ports Authority
