= Shafiqa Zawqari =

- شفيقة زوقري
- Born: 1942
- Occupation: Short story writer

Shafiqa Ahmad al-Zawqari (زوقري، شفيقة أحمد; born 1942) is a Yemeni short story writer.

Shafiqa Zawqari was born on 1942 in Aden, Yemen. As of 2008, she was a school principal living in the United Arab Emirates.

She was one of a number of women writers in 1970s Yemen creating direct, realistic stories involving contemporary issues, politics, and social criticism. Her prize-winning short story " ارملة الشهيد" (Armalat shahid/A Martyr's Widow) was published in the first issue of the periodical المجلة (Almajalah) in 1968. She has published two collections of short stories.

== Bibliography ==
- نبضات قلب/Nabadat qalb (Heartbeats), 1970
- حرمان ضالة أخرى/Hırmān Ḍāllah ukhrā (Another Unfulfilled Desire), 1977
