= Aden unrest (2015–2019) =

Conflict in southern Yemen between government, separatists and Islamists

Coordinates: 12.8000°N 45.0333°E

- Part of the South Yemen insurgency
- People gather at the site of a car bomb attack that killed the Aden governor, Jaafar Mohammed Saad, during the Aden unrest.
| Date | 6 October 2015 – 29 August 2019 (3 years, 10 months, 3 weeks and 2 days) |
| Location | Aden, Yemen |
| Result | STC Victory: ISIL expelled from Mualla; AQAP expelled from Al-Mansoura; Battle of Aden erupts in January 2018; STC takes control of Aden; Mass protests, assassinations, and renewed clashes between STC, Hadi loyalists, and other factions in late 2018 |

Belligerents
| AQAP | Yemen Army (Hadi government): Republican Guard; Amaliqah Brigade; Al-Islah; People's Committees; Popular resistance; Coalition: Saudi Arabia; Bahrain; Jordan; Kuwait; Morocco (2015–19); Qatar (2015–17); Sudan (2015–19) | Southern Transitional Council: Southern Movement; Southern Resistance Forces (SRF); Security Belt Forces; Abu Abbas Brigade; United Arab Emirates | Islamic State of Iraq and the Levant: Wilayat Aden |

Commanders and leaders
| Ali Abed al-Rab bin Talab †; Helmi Al Zinji (POW) | (Yemen) Abd Rabbuh Mansur Hadi (Saudi Arabia) Brig. Gen. Muhran Qabati (Yemen) Jaafar Mohammed Saad † (Yemen) Sheikh Abdulrahman al-Adani † (pro-Hadi Sunni cleric) (Yemen) Adham Mohammed Al Ga’ari † (Aden's deputy chief of intelligence) (Yemen) Abdrabu Hussein Al Israeli † (Commander of military forces in Abyan) (Yemen) Salem al-Milqat † (Police chief of Tawahi district) (Saudi Arabia) Sheikh Mazen al-Aqrabi † (Saudi Arabia) Saleh Ali al-Dibani † | (South Yemen) Aidarus al-Zoubaidi (South Yemen) Hani Bin Breik (South Yemen) Khalid Bamadhaf (Aden Southern Movement leader) (South Yemen) Saleh al-Emeiry (South Yemen) Kamel Al-Khalidi Abu Yunus | Abu Bilal al-Harbi † |

Strength
| 500+ | 12,000 Hadi loyalists and popular committees and 700+ Sudanese troops | 15,000 Southern Movement and al-Hizam Brigade fighters | 80-300 |

Casualties and losses
| 27-34+ fighters killed 23+ fighters wounded 21 fighters captured | 180-187+ Yemeni security forces killed 98-110+ wounded 1 Mirage 2000-9D lost 1 Saudi soldier killed | 6 UAE servicemen killed | 24-36+ killed 70 captured |
- 83+ civilians killed 178+ wounded and one Indian priest captured

The Aden unrest was a conflict between Islamist factions, such as al-Qaeda in the Arabian Peninsula, and Islamic State – Yemen Province, against the loyalists of president Abdrabbuh Mansour Hadi and later a conflict between UAE-backed and Saudi-backed factions within the coalition. In 2017, fighting also broke out between factions aligned with different members of the Saudi-led coalition namely Saudi Arabia-backed Hadi and Al-Islah and UAE-backed separatist Southern Transitional Council and Southern Movement.

== Attacks and incidents during 2015 ==
On October 6, 2015, terrorists incidents broke out when a group of Islamic State (IS) fighters targeted a motel in Aden which housed the Vice President and Prime Minister of Yemen, and served as the military base for the Arab Coalition and the Yemen Army units loyal to Yemeni president Abdrabbuh Mansour Hadi, killing 15 Hadi and Saudi loyalists. Two IS suicide bombers blew themselves up too. Although the Houthis were first suspected behind the attack by Yemeni Transport Minister Badr Basalma, IS claimed responsibility later.

On 13 October, Emirati counter-terrorism units arrived in Aden in response to the terrorist attacks of October 6. On the same day, another 300 Sudanese troops arrived in Aden.

On October 26, a suicide bomber exploded in central Aden killing two Southern Resistance troops. No group claimed responsibility.

At the end of October, AQAP overran some neighborhoods inside Aden, recruiting fighters, and imposing Sharia law.

On November 1, IS fighters attacked and captured a government media building in Tawahi district, killing on the same day two intelligence officers in the central Aden.

On November 4, some Popular resistance fighters attacked the presidential palace with Hadi's son inside, with Emirate soldiers stopping the attack without casualties. The resistance fighters said that they attacked to protest three months of unpaid salaries. On November 18, Bahrain troops arrived in Aden to assist the coalition against the armed groups.

On December 3, Saudi officials said that they would train over 12,000 popular resistance fighters to fight around and in Aden.

On December 6, Yemeni Major General and Aden governor, Jaafar Mohammed Saad, was killed along with six of his bodyguards in a suicide bombing. The attack was claimed by IS. On the same day, IS gunmen killed 4 Yemeni government fighters, and assassinated the judge Mohsen Alwan, who was investigated the USS Cole bombing. Also on the same day, unknown gunmen killed an energy official, and two security officers.

On December 23, unknown gunmen, believed to be AQAP assassins killed the popular resistance colonel Jalal al-Awbali in his car in northern Aden. No group claimed responsibility.

== Other incidents during 2016 ==
On 1 January 2016, Hadi loyalists attacked and killed an AQAP commander who was travelling from Abyan to Aden. The AQAP leader named Ali Abed al-Rab bin Talab was killed along with three of his bodyguards during the attack.

On January 18, a suicide bomber exploded outside of Aden's security director's home, the Brigadier General Shalal Ali Shayyeh, killing four of his bodyguards and injuring many bystanders. On the same day, unknown gunmen killed a judge in the street.

On January 19, Aden's governor banned motorbike use because of the many killings in the type of shot and running.

On January 23, unknown assailants killed a man and his father belonging in the Shia sect of Dawoodi Bohra. Four others kidnapped some days before belonging to the sect, but three of them have released with another one to remain in captivity.

On January 28, an IS suicide car bomber blew himself outside the home of Hadi, killing 6 loyalists and injuring another 11. Hadi was inside in his home at the time, but survived the attack unharmed.

On 12 February, AQAP fighters attacked and killed five Hadi loyalists guards in their posts in Basateen area of Aden.

On February 16, Governor of Aden Aidarus al-Zubaidi and Brigadier General Shalal Ali Shayyeh, escaped an assassination attempt on their lives after suspected IS fighters attacked their convoy in central of Aden. Three assailants killed, with another two bodyguards and civilians to be wounded during the gun battle.

On 28 February, unknown gunmen killed Sheikh Abdulrahman al-Adani, a pro-Hadi influential moderate Salafi cleric, well known for his rejection on Al-Qaeda and IS. No group claimed responsibility.

On 3 March, suspected AQAP gunmen attacked and killed Hussein al-Wuhayshi, a leader of Popular committees in the neighbor Abyan province, along with his brother in the borders of Aden-Abyan. No group claimed responsibility.

On March 10, popular committees units opened fire to security guards outside of an army HQ after one of their wounded died because of no use of permitted medication. The group had requested medication in a riot against commandeers of Aden. No man killed in the clashes.

On March 14, two UAE pilots were killed after they crashed by unknown reason in Aden. Some sources claims that AQAP shot down the plane, but that cannot official and independently confirmed.

On 16 March, three AQAP fighters were killed inside a home of one of them, when an exploding device inside the home exploded killing the three of them instantly.

On 12 April, an IS suicide bomber explode himself outside of a football stadium in near the coast of Aden, targeting new recruits of the army, killing five of them and wounding another 8. The youths where waiting the bus to get them in their base in the center of Aden.

On 17 April, two unknown suicide car bombers attacked Hadi loyalists in a checkpoint near Aden airport, killing 4 soldiers, and wounding two others. No group claimed responsibility.

On 28 April, a woman dressed suicide car bomber detonated himself outside of the home of general Shallal Shayae, security chief of Aden. No one killed by the attack, and no group claimed responsibility, but two bystanders wounded.

On 29 October, a car laden with explosives blew up near the headquarters of Yemen's central bank in the Crater district, injuring five people, local security sources said. There was no immediate claim of responsibility for the attack.

== Battle of Mualla (2016) ==
During 1 and 4 January 2016, a battle erupted in the port city of Mualla, which had previously been seized by IS militants. It was reported that the city was used by IS and AQAP for smuggling weapons and money. During the four days of battle, nine Hadi loyalists and 14 IS fighters were killed, with the Hadi loyalists gaining control of the entire area. On the next day, The Hadi government imposed a curfew in the city of Aden, in the honor of the dead victims. On the same day, suspected IS militants assassinated a Sufi cleric, the Sheikh Ali Othman al-Gailani. No group claimed responsibility for the assassination. More than 70 IS members were arrested on the next day, in Mualla.

== 2016 Sheikh Othman incidents ==
The incidents began in Sheikh Othman district, when on January 6, unidentified gunmen shot dead a colonel of Aden's criminal investigation office, inside his own car. On January 31, the body of a top Salafi cleric in the Sheikh Othman district, founded dead and tortured. The cleric was abducted some days before by militant groups. The cleric, named Samahan Abdel-Aziz, was very influential in the side of Hadi loyalists, rejecting AQAP, IS and Houthis in his speeches. No group claimed responsibility for the killing. On 29 February, a suspected IS suicide bomber explode himself outside of a military checkpoint, killing four and wounding seven Hadi loyalists, in the al-Mimdara neighborhood in Sheikh Othman. On 4 March, IS gunmen stormed an Elderly house care home run by Christian volunteers, and killed 1 guard, 11 residents of the house and four Indian Christian nuns. 1 Indian priest inside the home, kidnapped and is believed to executed some weeks after. His agency claims that the priest is not executed and is still alive. Pope Francis goddamned the attack, saying that was a diabolic action of mass murder. On April 29, gunmen on motorbikes assassinated the senior security officer of Aden, Colonel Marwan Abdulalim, when he was traveling in his car in Sheikh Othman district.

== 2016 crater bombings ==
The terror attacks began to show up in Crater district on December 30, when a VBIED explode in the district killing at least three people. No group claimed responsibility. On January 29, an IS car suicide bomber explode himself outside of a military checkpoint in the central Crater, killing two soldiers and wounding another five. IS claimed responsibility in online media outlets. On 29 February, fighter of popular committees clashed with Hadi guards outside of Army HQ in Crater demanding medical medication for their wounded fighters. No casualties reported.

== 2016 Inma attack ==
On January 5, a suicide attacker detonated near a convoy that was caring the governor of Aden and Lahji, and the Aden security director. The three officials survived the attack, but the gun battle followed killing at least three of their bodyguards. The militants fled to the desert areas of Aden, with the government suspecting IS for the attack.

== Battle of Al-Mansoura (2015–2016) ==
Map of the operation in Al-Mansoura in 2016

The major battle stage in Al-Mansoura began on December 31, when gunmen attacked a commander of popular resistance in Aden, the Ahmed al-Idrisi, killing him, and four of his aids. No group claimed responsibility.

On 11 January 2016, IS claimed that have assassinated a colonel in Al-Mansoura, showing the assassination in a video. The organization don't tells when the killing is taken place.

On January 11, unidentified gunmen attacked and killed a police security officer in his way to his home in Al-Mansoura. No group claimed responsibility for the attack.

On 23 January, unidentified gunmen killed a Hadi loyalist in Al-Mansoura and fled out with motorbikes. The day after, gunmen killed Colonel Taha al-Sobeihi inside his police vehicle, along with a bodyguard and a female civilian.

On 9 February, fighting taken place in the city and shopping centers of Al-Mansoura, killing two AQAP fighters and a civilian family of four. The fighting began when Hadi loyalists backed by Saudi Apache stormed AQAP positions in the city central and the shopping center, in an attempt to drive out al-Qaeda militants for the parts of the city, which they have been in control in the city from the early of October. During the fight, a rocked from unknown origin, hit a home and killed a family of four, two kids and the two parents. Also a 5-year-old daughter of the family wounded in the strike.

Two days later, on 11 February, AQAP soldiers attacked and killed three Hadi loyalists as they walked into the central road of Al-Mansoura. On 20 February, AQAP fighters assassinated a senior Hadi loyalists commander, named Sheikh Mazen al-Aqrabi.

On 23 February, suspected AQAP fighters attacked and killed two high level security officials as they driving into their homes inside a car. The two officials identified as General Abdrabu Hussein Al Israeli, the commander of military forces in Abyan province, and Ga’abal Alawi Amras, the deputy of Aden's political security who was driving the car.

On March 5, suspected IS gunmen attacked the Colonel Salem al-Milqat, police chief of Tawahi district, killing his and his aide inside his convoy in the central of Al-Mansoura.

On March 17, Hadi loyalists backed by UAE Apache helicopters attacked AQAP fighters in Al-Mansoura after militants attacked an UAE Apache helicopter with a rocked missile trike. 17 AQAP soldiers killed, along with a civilian, and another 23 AQAP fighters wounded. Three Hadi loyalists also wounded during the operation. After the operation, AQAP retreated deeper into Al-Mansoura city.

On March 30, Hadi loyalists aided by UAE and Saudi forces stormed the remaining areas held by AQAP in Al-Mansoura, clearing the city and capturing 21 AQAP fighters. The remaining AQAP fighters fled in the neighbor Lahij Governorate's provincial capital, Al Houta, a town in control of AQAP since the early beginnings of 2016.

On April 14, the Hadi government told the press that the army has captured the AQAP commander of Aden's assassin's cell, Helmi Al Zinji. The government told that Al Zinji captured after al-Qaeda expelled from Al-Mansoura, on March 30, where he tried to fled to nearly AQAP controlled town of Zinjibar.

On April 14, an IS planned car bomb exploded outside of ministry of foreign affair, wounding several bystanders. No one killed in the attack.

On May 1, a suspected IS suicide bomber exploded himself near a convoy with Aden's governor and security chief inside, killing four guards. The officials survived the attack. No group claimed responsibility.

On 6 May, unknown gunmen killed Al-Mansoura prison chief Wahad Awn when he left his mother's house. One of his bodyguards also killed. No group claimed responsibility.

== 2016 Aden car bombing ==
On 25 March 2016, three IS car suicide bombers detonated themselves in checkpoints in multiple places in Aden, killing 17 soldiers and 10 civilians, also wounding dozens. The group claimed responsibility in online outlets.

== 2016 fighting in Khormaksar ==
Fighting erupted in Khormaksar district of Aden on 10 February when AQAP fighters attacked security guards from they bases in Mansoura. Reports said that civilians and army guards killed in the fighting by car bombs and missile strikes in the Aden international airport of the city. On February 26, suspected IS gunmen attacked and killed colonel Adham Mohammed Al Ga’ari. The colonel was inside in his car and traveled in Khormaksar with his two sons when the gunmen attacked. One of his sons was wounded in the attack. On 7 May, unknown gunmen inside a car, assassinated colonel Badr Al Yafei and two of his bodyguards. No group claimed responsibility. On 23 May, two IS suicide bombers staggering brigadier general Abdullah Al Subaihi killed at least 45 Hadi loyalists and wounded dozens of other soldiers, outside and inside of a base in Khormaksar. General Al Subaihi survived the attack.

== 2016 Al Buraiqeh bombings ==
On February 17, 2016, an IS suicide bomber explode himself inside Ras Abbas camp of Al Buraiqeh district, killing more than 13 and wounding more than 60 new recruits loyal to president Hadi. IS claimed responsibility in online outlets claiming that 20 Hadi loyalists were killed in the attack, and not 13.

== Clashes between STC and Hadi loyalists ==
Factional fighting broke out in the vicinity of Aden International Airport on 12 February 2017. The Presidential Guard, loyal to Hadi, attempted to seize the airport from a UAE-backed militia that had controlled it since 2015. A Coalition helicopter gunship reportedly opened fire on the pro-Emirati faction, wounding three soldiers. These clashes have been interpreted as evidence of a deepening rift between members of the Coalition.

In early March, Sudanese soldiers reportedly assaulted the airport, in an attempt to wrest control from the pro-Emirati forces.

In the end of April 2017, Aden Governor Aidarus al-Zoubaidi was sacked by Hadi, with the reason of disloyalty to him, and loyalty to the Southern Movement.

On May 3, major rallies were held in Aden to protest the decision of Hadi.

One week later, STC was formed, and some of the members were the governors of Shabwah Governorate, Hadramaut Governorate, Lahij Governorate, Socotra, and Al Mahrah Governorate. It haves also partial control in Abyan Governorate and in Aden.

One day later, Hadi rejected the council, and called it illegitimate.

On 31 May, fighters loyal to STC captured Aden airport from Hadi loyalists, killing two men. The Aden airport issue first erupted when Hadi himself was refused landing permission in early February and had to land instead of on the Yemeni island of Socotra before he made another attempt to fly back into Aden. Hadi then had Brigadier General Muhran Qabati, commander of the Fourth Brigade - which acts as the presidential bodyguard - lay siege to the airport, and clashes between the two sides followed. On June 12, Al-Alam checkpoint handed over to al Hizam Brigade by Hadi loyalist commander, Saleh Ali Al-Dibani. The Hizam brigade commander who took command of the checkpoint, is Kamel Al-Khalidi Abu Yunus.

On January 28, 2018, the Southern Transitional Council captured the government headquarters in Aden. Thereupon, Yemen's Prime Minister Ahmed Obeid bin Daghr spoke of a "coup" and asked Saudi Arabia for military support. President Abdrabu Mansur Hadi ordered his forces to cease fire immediately after fierce clashes with southern separatists broke out in Aden.

On 29 January President of the STC Aidarus al-Zoubaidi announced the state of emergency in Aden and that "the STC has begun the process of overthrowing Hadi's rule over the South".

On 30 January 2018, the STC seized control of Aden.

In October 2018, STC announced it was rising up against Hadi's government.

In October 2018, Hadi loyalist officials started escaping from the city to Saudi Arabia and Egypt.

On 10 October 2018, elite pro-Hadi forces were diverted from the Hodeidah front to Aden.

On 29 August 2019, the Southern Transitional Council took control of Aden and Zinjibar.

On 5 November 2019, the Riyadh Agreement was signed by the warring sides, leading to an official end to the conflict and fighting. Despite this, tensions continued to increase between both sides and the STC withdrew from the peace deal in August 2022.

== Assassinations ==
During the civil war there were many assassinations in Aden. During 2017–2018, at least 27 Imams were assassinated in Aden by suspected STC and UAE-linked militants, reportedly for opposing South Yemen separatism.

In October 2018, Abraham Golan, the founder and CEO of PMC, Spear Operations Group, revealed that UAE hired his firm to assassinate multiple members of Al-Islah in Yemen.

== See also ==
- Outline of the Yemeni Crisis, revolution, and civil war (2011-present)
