= Ahmed Lamlas =

Yemeni politician and minister

Ahmed Lamlas (Arabic: أحمد حامد لملس; born 1970 ) is a Yemeni politician currently serving as a minister of state and governor of Aden.

== Political career ==
He was born in 1970 in Shabwah. He held many positions, including the director of Shaikh Outhman District in 2003, Al-Mansoura District in 2007, and Khur Maksar in 2012. He was appointed as the governor of Shabwah in 2016 and Aden in 2020. He has been a member of state since 2022. He has recently been appointed as the Secretary General of the Southern Transitional Council.
