= Jaafar Mohammed Saad =

Governor of Yemen's Aden Governorate in 2015 (d. 2015)

Governor of Aden Governorate
- In office 9 October 2015 – 6 December 2015
- President: Abdrabbuh Mansour Hadi
- Preceded by: Nayef al-Bakri
- Succeeded by: Aidarus al-Zoubaidi

Personal details
- Born: 5 May 1950 Ash Shaikh Outhman District, Aden Governorate, Yemen
- Died: 6 December 2015 (aged 65) Tawahi, Aden Governorate, Yemen
- Cause of death: Assassination (car bomb attack)

Military service
- Allegiance: South Yemen; Yemen
- Rank: Major general
- Battles/wars: Yemeni Civil War (1994); Yemeni Civil War (2015-present)

Major General Jaafar Mohammed Saad (Arabic: جعفر محمد سعد; born 1950 – died 6 December 2015) was a Yemeni politician and soldier.

== Biography ==
Saad was a soldier for South Yemen before unification with North Yemen in 1990. Local officials said he fought for South Yemen in the Yemeni Civil War of 1994 and later lived in exile in Egypt and the United Kingdom.

Saad, who held the rank of Major-General, helped government forces defend the city of Aden from Houthis in the Yemeni Civil War of 2015. He was appointed as Governor of Aden Governorate on 9 October 2015.

== Death ==
Jaafar Mohammed Saad was assassinated on 6 December 2015 when a car bomb targeted his convoy in the Tawahi district of Aden. The attack resulted in his death along with five of his bodyguards. The Islamic State of Iraq and the Levant claimed responsibility for the bombing. However, the circumstances surrounding the assassination, as well as the political and security developments that followed in Aden, have led some observers and analysts to question the official account and point to alternative interpretations regarding the parties that may have benefited from the attack.

== See also ==
- 2015 Aden car bombing
