= RAF Sheikh Othman =

RAF Sheikh Othman RAF Unit Sheikh Othman
- Sheikh Othman District, Aden, Aden Governorate in Yemen
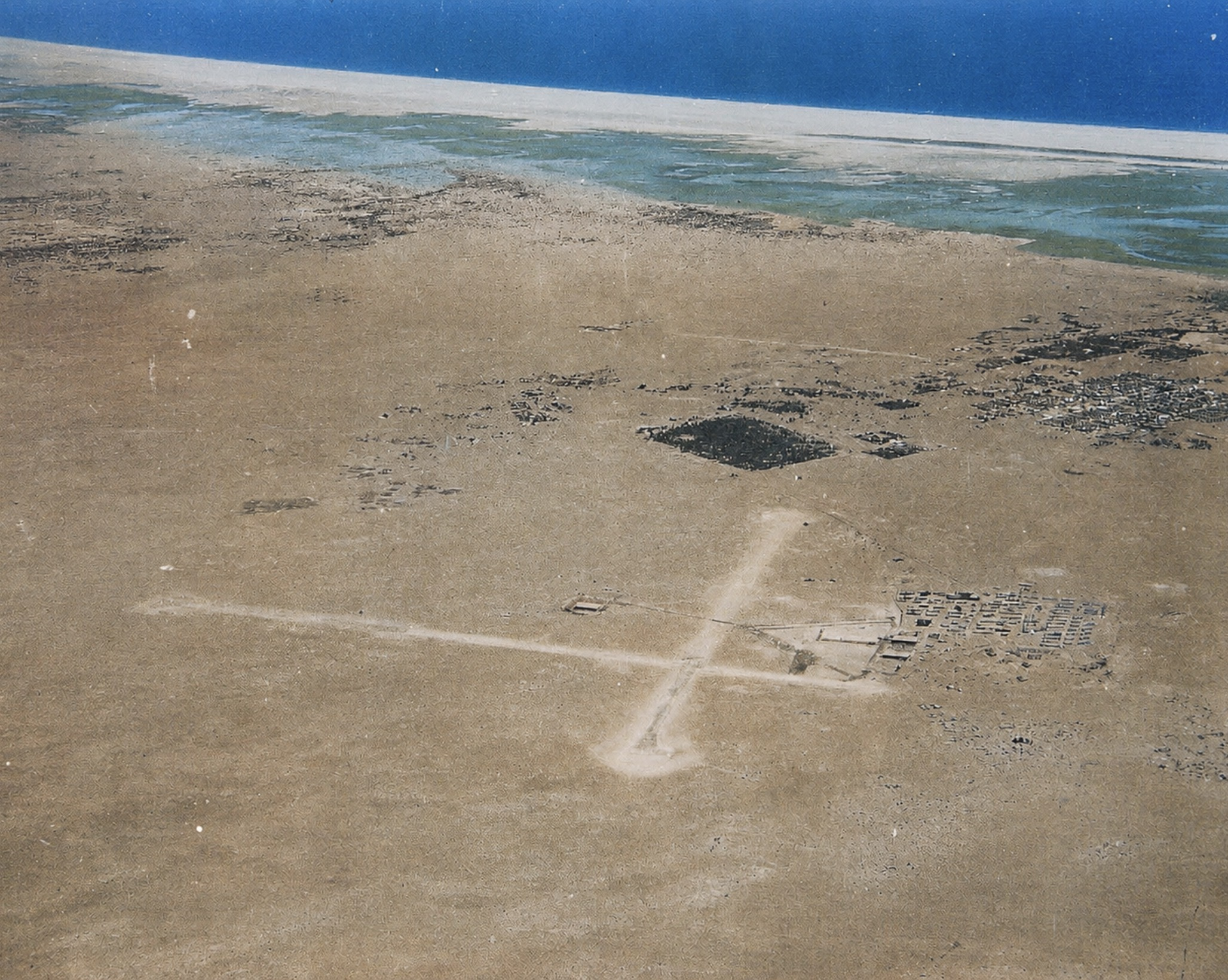
- Oblique photograph of RAF Sheikh Othman.

Site information
- Type: Royal Air Force station
- Owner: Air Ministry
- Operator: Royal Air Force; United States Army Air Forces
- Controlled by: AHQ Aden

Location
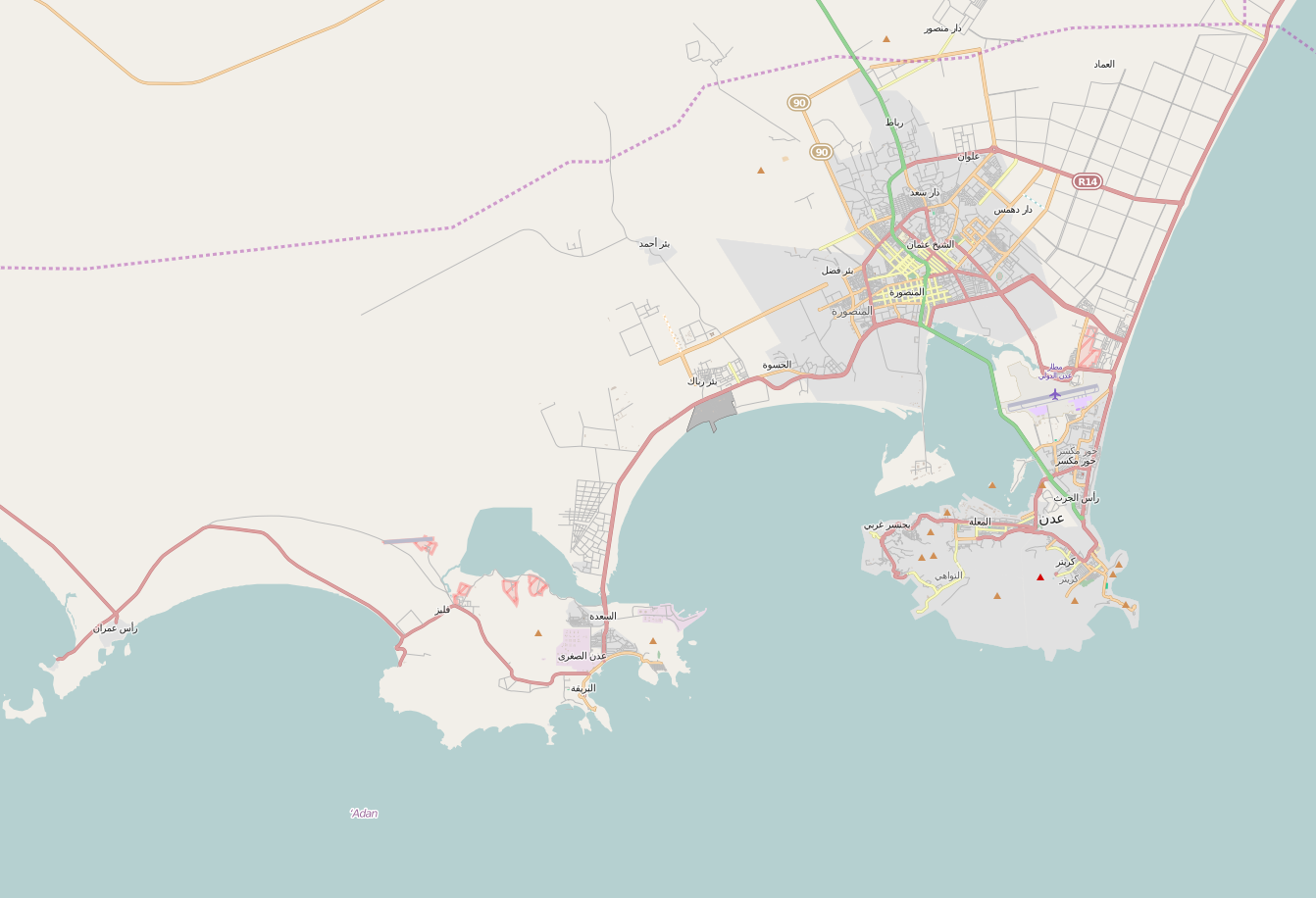
- Shown within Yemen RAF Sheikh Othman (Yemen)
- Coordinates: 12°52′44″N 44°58′03″E

Site history
- Built: 1936
- In use: 1936-1950
- Battles/wars: Mediterranean and Middle East theatre of World War II

Royal Air Force RAF Sheikh Othman or more simply RAF Sheikh Othman, also known as Bir Fadhl Airfield, is a former Royal Air Force station located within Sheikh Othman District, Aden, Aden Governorate, Yemen.

== History ==
In 1936, an airfield was established at Bir Fadhl for establishing communication links in the Aden Protectorate and British Somaliland and supporting tribal control. At the start of the Second World War, Bir Fadhl Airfield was the only permanent airfield in the Aden Protectorate. In late 1939, the expansion of the airfield was completed, allowing it to handle one full squadron. Additionally, it provided additional accommodation for Indian infantry units. In 1940, the airfield was renamed to Sheikh Othman, and further extensions took place in 1941 to house an operational training unit. On 9 June 1942, a Staging Post was established at the base. By 1943, Aden was recognised as a strategic base for anti-submarine and escort operations to the Far East. As a result, RAF Sheikh Othman was partly handed to the United States Army Air Forces. On 3 March 1943, the Staging Post was expanded and upgraded into the Station Headquarters (HQ). In May 1944, control of the base was transferred to No. 115 Wing. The HQ was absorbed back into RAF Unit Sheikh Othman (Staging Post) on 1 June 1946.

In 1950, RAF Sheikh Othman was closed, and it began operating as an emergency landing ground afterwards. Constant rolling and watering of the runway allowed it to be used for jet training. Maintenance of the airfield ceased in 1953. By 1958, the former airfield's runways had become unserviceable due to prolonged inactivity.

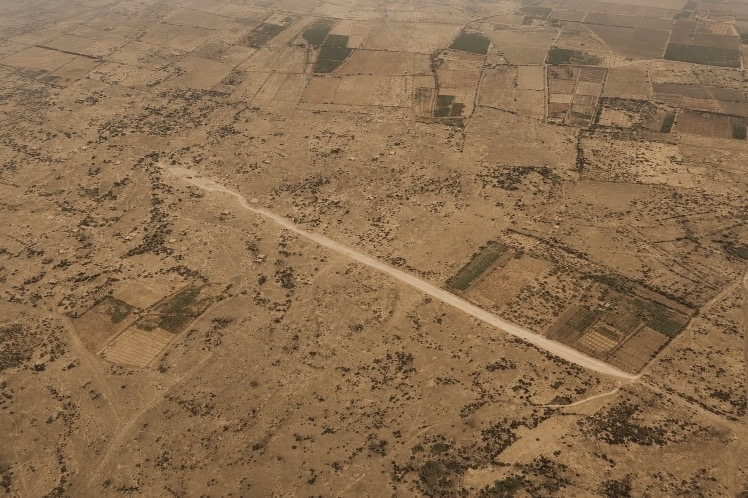
An aerial photograph showing the former RAF Sheikh Othman: a dirt road runs over the former runway.

== Units ==
The following units were here at some point:

- Detachment from No. 8 Squadron RAF between April 1939 and July 1940 with the Bristol Blenheim I
- No. 11 Squadron RAF between 16 June and 1 December 1940 with the Blenheim I
- No. 39 Squadron RAF between 13 May and 1 December 1940 with the Blenheim I
- No. 41 Squadron RAF between 18 March and 11 August 1936 with the Hawker Demon
- No. 94 Squadron RAF between 2 May 1939 and 19 April 1941 with the Gloster Gladiator I & II
- No. 203 Squadron RAF between 15 February and 18 May 1940 with the Short Singapore III and the Blenheim I & IV
- No. 73 Operational Training Unit RAF between 20 November 1941 and 30 November 1942 with the Curtiss Mohawk and Hawker Hurricane I
- No. 3 (Middle East) Ferry Control RAF between 20 May 1942 and 1 February 1944
- No. 30 Staging Post between 9 June 1942 and 1 June 1946
- Fighter Defence Flight, Aden between 1 October 1942 and 31 January 1943 with the Hurricane I

== See also ==
- List of former Royal Air Force stations
