= Aden unrest =

Aden unrest can refer to the following violent incidents in Aden, Yemen:

- 1947 Aden riots
- Yemeni–Adenese clan violence (1956–1960)
- Aden unrest (2015–present)
