= 2015 Aden car bombing =

ISIL assassination of the governor of Aden, Yemen, and his entourage

- Part of the Aden unrest and the Yemeni civil war (2014–present)
- Location of Aden Governorate in Yemen
- Location: Aden, Aden Governorate, Yemen
- Date: 6 December 2015
- Attack type: Car bombing
- Weapon: Bomb
- Deaths: 7
- Injuries: Unknown
- Perpetrator: Islamic State – Yemen Province

On 6 December 2015, a car bomb attack killed Aden governor, Major General Jaafar Mohammed Saad, and his entourage. Saad's caravan was traveling to his office in a western district of Aden.

The Islamic State of Iraq and the Levant Yemen branch claimed responsibility for the car bomb. They described Saad as an oppressor and infidel and threatened further attacks in Yemen. The group stated that they detonated the bomb as Saad's convoy passed where the car was parked.

The explosion was powerful and was heard from 10 km away. Six bodyguards of Saad were killed and several people injured. Medics stated the victims bodies were unrecognizable. Photographs, supposedly of the attack, showed a burning, wrecked car.

The Islamic State released a video under Aden-Abyan Province media, which the bombing was part of it.
