= Big Ben Aden =

Clock tower in Aden, Yemen

Coordinates: 12°47′24″N 44°58′53″E

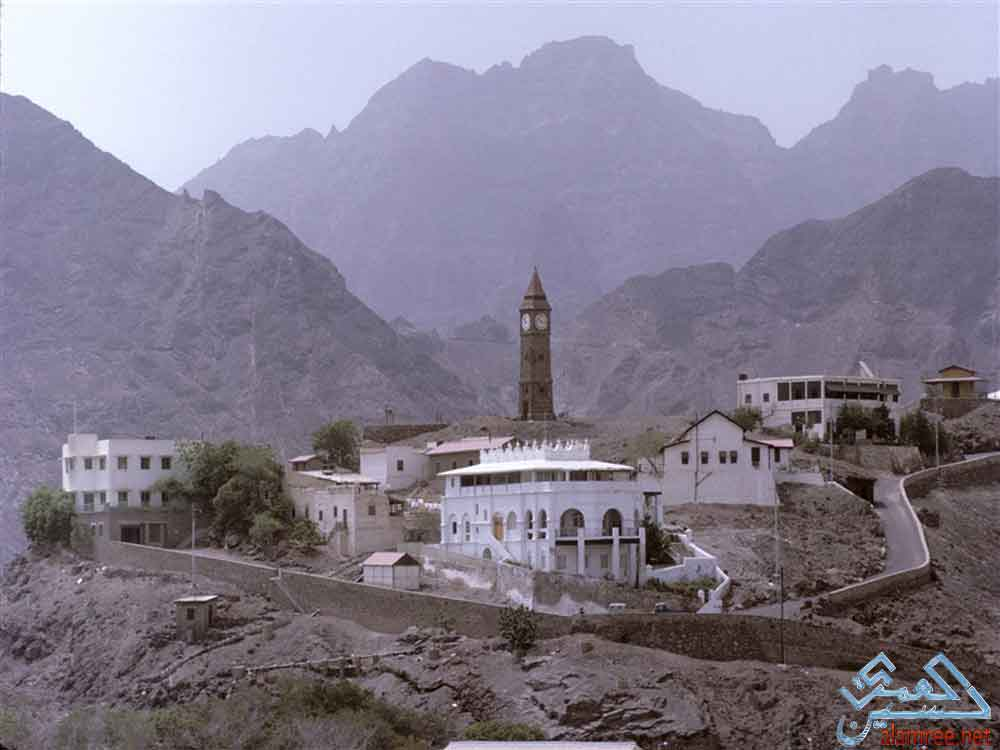
Big Ben Aden in 1964

Big Ben Aden (Arabic: بيغ بن عدن), also known as Little Ben and the Hogg Clock Tower, is a clock tower beside Aden Harbour in Yemen, built during British rule. It stands on a hill in Al-Tawahi, historically known as Steamer Point. It is superficially similar to the Elizabeth Tower (popularly known as Big Ben), the clock tower attached to the Palace of Westminster in London.

The tower was completed in 1892–93 to commemorate the tenure of Brigadier-General Adam George Forbes Hogg as political resident at Aden. The clock stopped during fighting in 1986 and was restored in 2002. Further repairs were announced in 2012.

== History ==
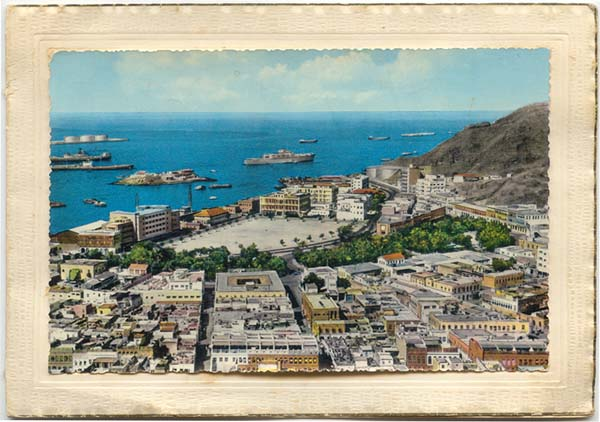
Postcard of Tawahi

Aden came under British rule in 1839 and developed as a coaling station for steamships. The opening of the Suez Canal in 1869 increased its importance on international shipping routes. Steamer Point developed around the harbour's deep-water access, with shipping offices, shops and hotels along the waterfront. The clock tower was erected on the higher ground behind the Prince of Wales' Crescent.

Construction was completed during the 1892–93 administrative year. The tower commemorated Hogg's term as political resident, from 1885 to 1890, and was paid for by public subscription. Hogg (1836–1908) was a Bombay Army officer who later became a lieutenant-general.

== Description ==
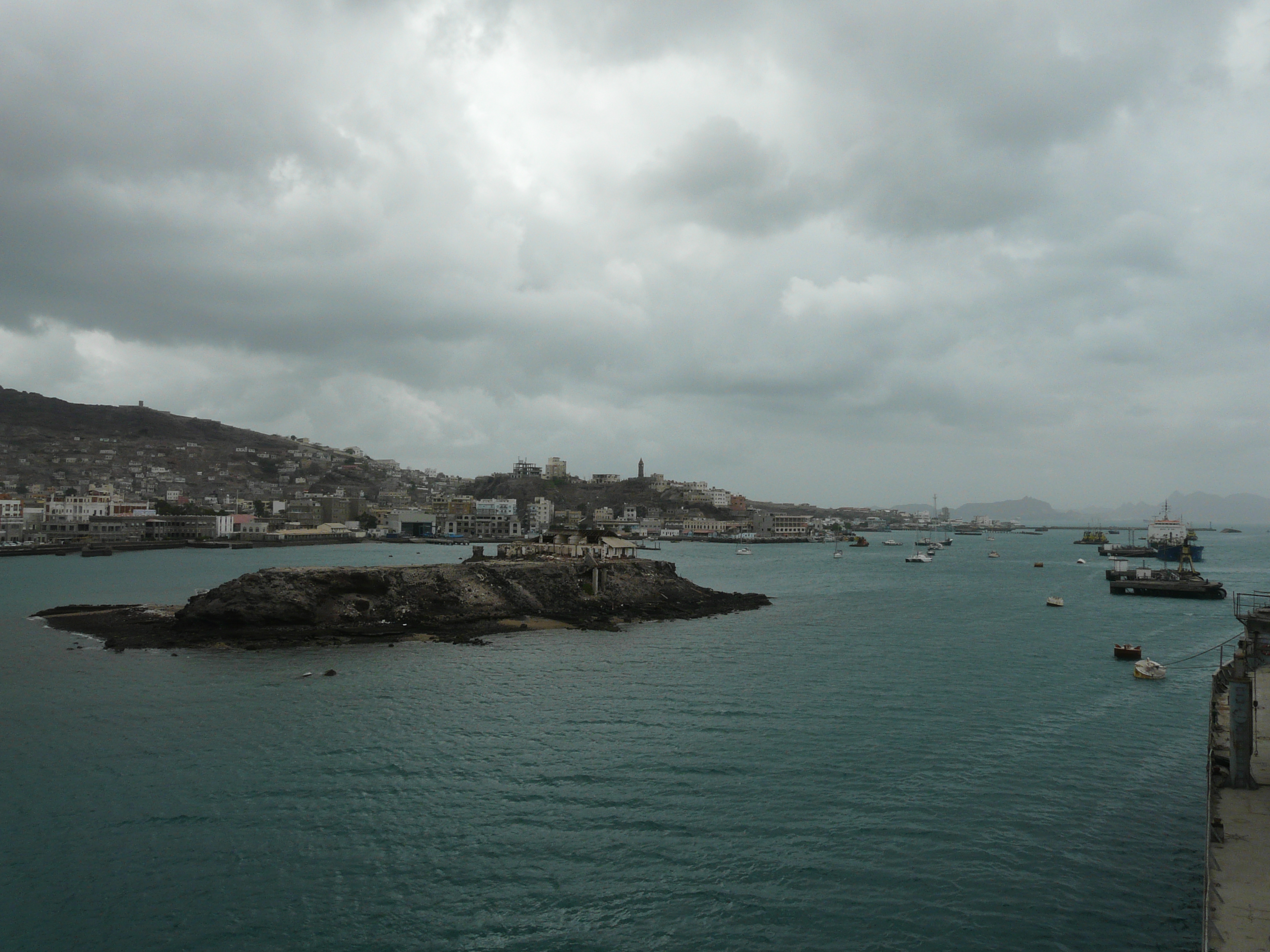
Big Ben Aden viewed from the inner roadstead in 2010

The tower overlooks the sea and the Tawahi area. Inside, it has an iron staircase. At its completion, it was recorded as 60 feet (18.3 m) high, with four clock dials each 7 feet (2.1 m) in diameter.

== Restoration ==
The clock broke down in the early 1960s and was repaired by Yemeni engineers in the 1980s. It stopped again during the fighting of 13 January 1986. By 1999, two of its four faces and all its hands were missing. The British consul sought information about the tower's history to support a restoration proposal.

In October 2002, a British engineer and staff from the local Public Works and Roads office repaired the clock, installing an electrical mechanism with a 12-volt battery backup. British assistance with the restoration was acknowledged in Parliament in April 2003. The clock was working in February 2006, although nearby construction obstructed views of its faces from some locations.

In January 2012, Al-Tawahi's local council and public works office were carrying out further repairs at a reported cost of six million Yemeni rials, equivalent to US$24,000. The work included four replacement white fibreglass faces, lighting, hands, a control device and repairs to the exterior. A return to service was planned for the following February. By November 2014, the clock again needed repair.

On 18 August 2026, district director Riyad Hassan Ali inspected the tower and the separate Peace Clock to discuss returning them to service. The visit included discussions with the operating team about the technical and logistical requirements for repairs.

== Gallery ==
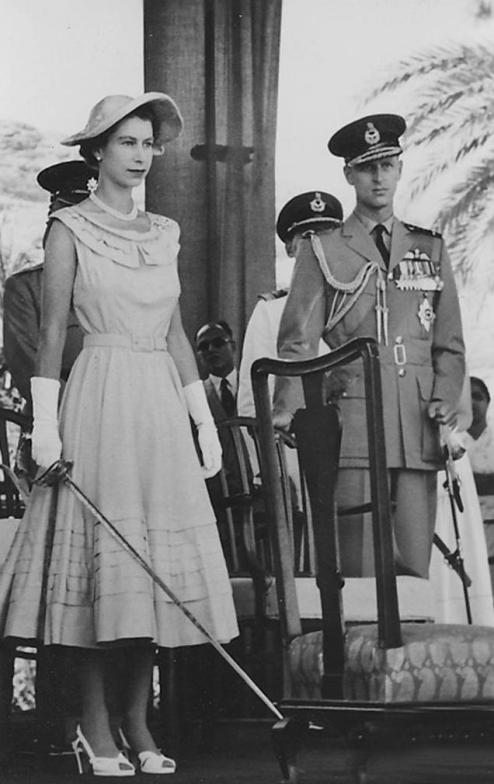
Elizabeth II during her visit to Aden in 1954, with Prince Philip at right
