= Abu Osama al-Muhajer =

Leader of the ISIL-YP

- Native name: أبو أسامة المهاجر
- Died: 9 July 2023 Aleppo Governorate, Syria
- Allegiance: Islamic State – Yemen Province
- Service years: – 2023

Muhammad Qan'an Al-Saya'ri, known by his nom de guerre Abu Osama al-Muhajer (Arabic: أبو أسامة المهاجر), was the former leader of the Islamic State – Yemen Province (IS-YP). On 25 June 2019, Saudi special forces announced that they captured Abu Osama al-Muhajer, on 3 June along with other members including the chief financial officer of the organization.

On 9 July 2023, al-Muhajer was assassinated in Northwestern Syria in a drone strike by the U.S. Military's CENTCOM.
