= Islamic State – Yemen Province =

Branch of Islamic State, active in Yemen

Yemen Province
- ولاية اليمن
- The logo of the Islamic State's Yemen Province
- Leaders: Abu Bilal al-Harbi † (c. 2014 – March 2017); Abu Osama al-Muhajir (POW) (March 2017 – 3 June 2019); Unknown (since 2019)
- Dates active: 13 November 2014 – present
- Headquarters: Yemen
- Active regions: Yemen
- Ideology: Islamic Statism
- Size: 300 (June 2015); 500 (2018); 250 (2023); 100 (2025)
- Part of: Islamic State
- Wars: the Yemeni Civil War

The Islamic State – Yemen Province (IS-YP; Arabic: الدولة الإسلامية – ولاية اليَمَن, romanized: ad-Dawlah al-Islāmiyah – Wilayat al-Yaman) is a branch of the militant Islamist group Islamic State (IS), active in Yemen. IS announced the group's formation on 13 November 2014.

== Organization ==
Yemen Province's organizational structure is divided into geographical based sub-units. There are at least eight known sub-provinces active in Yemen as of 2015, many named after existing administrative divisions of Yemen:

Logo	Name	Native Name	Area	Citation
	Wilayah Sana'a	ولاية صنعاء	around Yemen's capital of the same name	
	Wilayah Aden-Abyan	ولاية عدن-أبين	around the Aden Governorate	
	Wilayah Lahij	ولاية لحج	in the governorate of Lahij	
	Wilayah al-Liwa al-Akhdar (Note: lit. "Green Brigade Province")	ولاية اللواء الاخضر	in the southwestern governorates of Ibb and Taiz	
	Wilayah al-Bayda	ولاية البيضاء	in the central Al Bayda Governorate	
	Wilayah Shabwah	ولاية شبوة	in around the area of Shabwah Governorate	
	Wilayah Hadramawt	ولاية حضرموت	in the large eastern Hadhramaut Governorate	

At least seven separate sub-wilayah have claimed responsibility for attacks in Yemen, including Wilayah Sana'a, Wilayah Lahij, and Wilayah al-Bayda.

By 2018, all the wilayat in Yemen were merged as a singular "Yemen Wilayah" similar to ISIL's merger of its Iraqi and Syrian provinces into singular provinces rather than several smaller ones.

In summer 2020, the Houthis cleared 1000 square kilometers of terrain from AQAP and ISIS forces in their Al Bayda offensive. Abu Al-Walid Al-Adani, ISIS Emir in Qifah District was killed in this offensive. With that, the largest known ISIS pocket in Yemen was eliminated.

As of 2025 all ISIL forces have been completely defeated with only a few cell networks remaining and in hiding with their current positions unknown.

== Activities ==
On 13 November 2014, IS announced that a branch of the group had been established in Yemen, following pledges of allegiance made by unidentified militants in the country. al-Qaeda in the Arabian Peninsula (AQAP), the strongest militant group in the country, rejected this establishment. By December 2014, IS had begun to build an active presence inside Yemen, and its recruitment drive brought it into direct competition with AQAP. The branch's first attack occurred in March 2015, when it carried out suicide bombings on 2 Shia Mosques in the Yemeni capital. In the following months it continued to carry out attacks aimed largely at civilian targets associated with the Shia Houthi movement.

The group has been able to attract recruits by appealing to heightened sectarianism in the country following the outbreak of the Yemeni Civil War in 2015. It has received a number of defectors from al-Qaeda in the Arabian Peninsula, who are drawn by the group's money and its ability to carry out regular attacks against the Houthis. This has led to increased tensions with AQAP, although the two sides had avoided clashes as of late 2015.

On 6 October 2015, IS militants conducted a series of suicide bombings in Aden that killed 15 soldiers affiliated with the Hadi government and the Saudi-led coalition. The attacks were directed against the al-Qasr hotel, which had been a headquarters for pro-Hadi officials, and also military facilities. The group carried out further attacks against pro-Hadi forces, including the December 2015 assassination of Aden's governor. The group experienced a major split in the same month, when dozens of its members, including military and religious leaders, publicly rejected ISIL's leader in Yemen for perceived violations of Sharia. ISIL's central command condemned the dissenters, accusing them of violating their pledge to al-Baghdadi. A member of AQAP claimed in early 2016 that about 30 members of IS in Yemen had recently defected to his organisation, unhappy with the group's tactics and targeting of mosques and Muslim civilians.

On 15 May 2016, IS militants claimed responsibility for a suicide attack that killed 25 police recruits in the city of Mukalla in southern Yemen. AQAP was forced out of the city in April by the Saudi-led coalition. On November 15, Assailants (suspected to be Islamic State Militants)raided a residence and beheaded a civilian near Bayda, Al Bayda.

On February 14, 2017, an ISIS suicide car bomb blast against at a sports club in Radaa, Al Bayda, killing three houthi fighters and wound eight people more. ISIS fighters shelled the house of a tribal leader, killing a civilian and wounding another, in Bakarat, Al Qurayshiyah.

On 26 April 2019, IS militants claimed a bombing against a grocery store in Yakla, Al Bayda, killing eight civilians. Months later, in 30 August, IS claimed responsibility for a suicide attack that killed 3 soldiers of security belt forces.

On 18 August 2020, IS members attacked tribal forces in Wadi Yakla, Al Bayda. the result of the attack is unknown. The next month, IS spokesman Abu Hamza al-Qurashi offered condolences to the organization's Yemen branch confirming end of IS territorial control in the country.

On 9 July 2022, an IS suicide bomber riding a motorcycle bombed a Houthi convoy about 160 km southeast of Sana’a, in the Afar region of al-Bayda. Several Houthis were killed or wounded.

As of 2025, IS controls no direct territory in Yemen, but its regional affiliate was believed to still operate with about 100 fighters. By and large, researcher Daniel Milton described IS-YP as "repressed" branch of IS, deeming the Houthis as being mainly responsible for mostly dismantling it.

== Leadership ==
The first known leader of IS-YP was Abu Bilal al-Harbi, which started the rule on 6 July 2015 and died in 2017. In March 2017, Yemeni national Abu Osama al-Muhajer became leader, but was captured by Saudi coalition forces on 25 June 2019.

== Designation as a terrorist organization ==
Country	Date	References
United States	19 May 2016	
Iraq	10 March 2020	
