= Glasfabrik Lamberts =

Glass manufacturer in Germany

- Type: GmbH & Co. KG
- Industry: Glass production
- Founded: 1887
- Headquarters: Wunsiedel, Bavaria, Germany
- Key people: Christoph Lamberts, CEO
- Products: Architectural glass
- Number of employees: ca. 150
- Website: www.lamberts.info

Glasfabrik Lamberts is a glass manufacturing company in Germany. Established in 1887 by Laurenz Lamberts, it is managed by the fourth generation of the family to the present day. The Glashütte is the only independent glass factory in the world to produce all four types of cast glass. Lamberts is the only glass factory in Germany and Europe to manufacture profiled glass in all production stages within Europe. The company’s headquarters and production plant are located in Holenbrunn, a suburb of Wunsiedel in the Fichtelgebirge region.

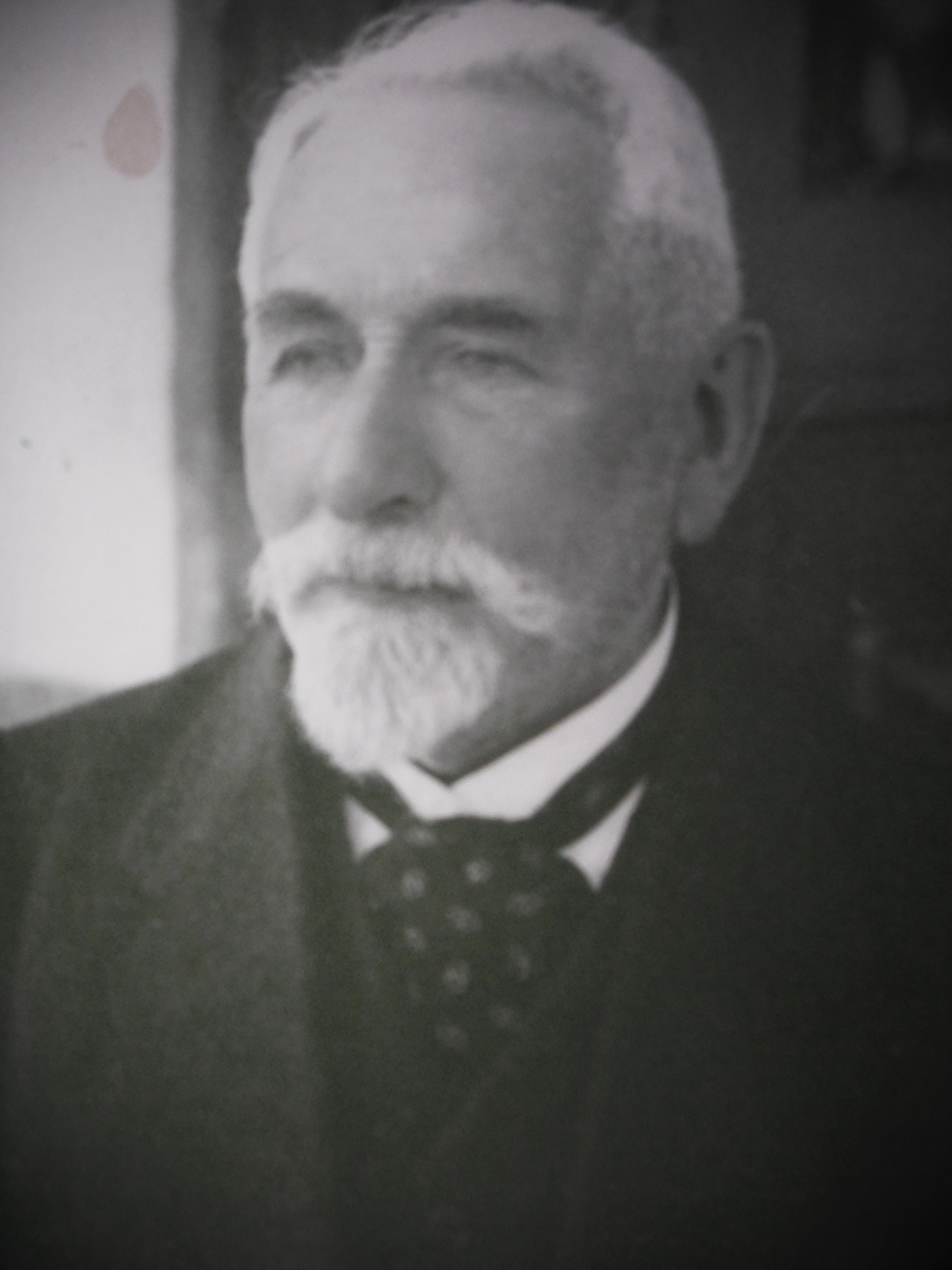
Company founder Laurenz Lamberts

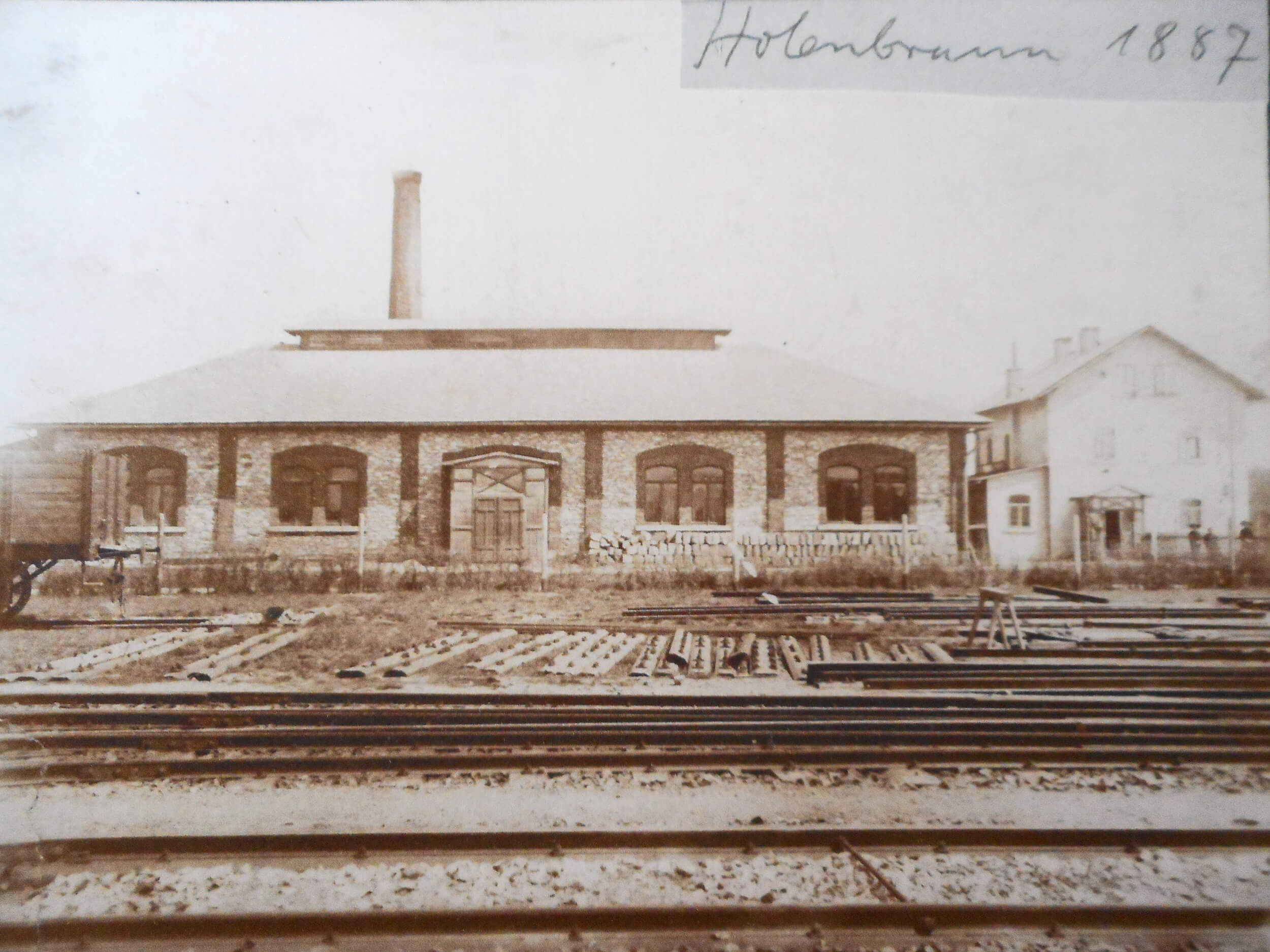
Glasfabrik in the year 1887

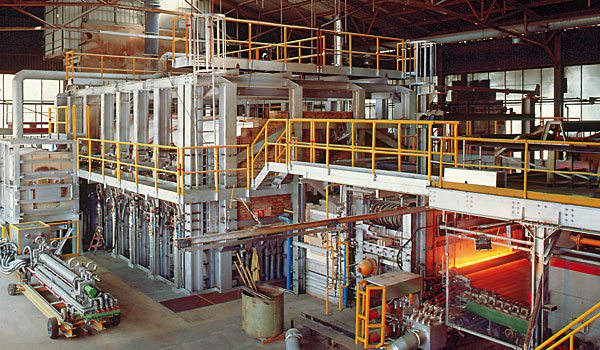
The Glasfabrik production plant today

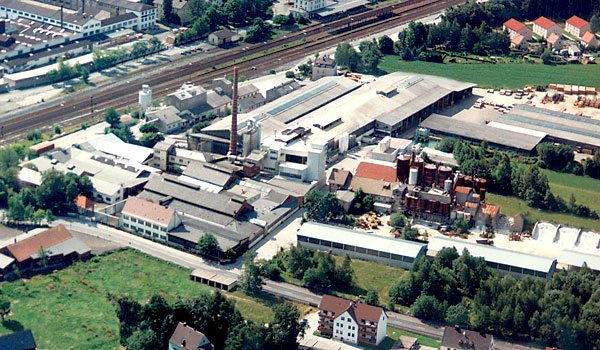
Aerial view of the company site in Wunsiedel

== History ==
Laurenz Lamberts bought the company premises on 23 May 1887 and founded the Glasfabrik in the same year. He did not choose Wunsiedel at random. One reason for the location was the regionally available raw materials. Even today the resources used for production come directly from the region. The second important reason was the expansion of the railway line between Regensburg and Hof and the connection to Holenbrunn. The station was essential for the company in terms of transporting its glass products.

== Production ==
Glasfabrik Lamberts is the only independent manufacturer of cast glass to produce profile glass, ornamental glass, wired glass and antimony-free solar glass.

Since 1996 the company has manufactured all its types of glass with the aid of an oxygen-fired glass melting furnace and sold them as EcoGlass, and it still the only producer of architectural glass to do so. Up to 50% waste glass is used in the various glass products and 100% of the glass waste is recycled. Since 2011 the entire production facility and offices have been completely powered by green electricity from Bavarian hydroelectric power plants.

== Big Ben ==
During Big Ben's 2017 renovation, the original Victorian glass plates used for the dials were removed and replaced with faithful reproductions made in Germany by Glasfabrik Lamberts.
