= David Buggé =

English cricketer and banker

Personal information
- Full name: David Anthony Bowdell Buggé
- Born: 12 December 1956 (age 69); Tawahi, Colony of Aden
- Batting: Right-handed
- Bowling: Right-arm medium-fast

Domestic team information
- Years: Team
- 1977: Oxford University

Career statistics
Competition	First-class
Matches	1
Runs scored	0
Batting average	–
100s/50s	–/–
Top score	–
Balls bowled	42
Wickets	0
Bowling average	–
5 wickets in innings	–
10 wickets in match	–
Best bowling	–
Catches/stumpings	–/–
- Source: Cricinfo, 26 January 2020

David Anthony Bowdell Buggé (born 12 December 1956) is an English banker and former first-class cricketer.

Buggé was born in the Colony of Aden in December 1956. He was educated in England at Cranleigh School, before going up to Oriel College, Oxford. While studying at Oxford, he made a single appearance in first-class cricket for Oxford University against Gloucestershire at Oxford in 1977. After graduating from Oxford, Buggé became a banker. He worked in a number of senior positions within the banking industry, including with Deutsche Bank and Citigroup, which he joined in 2011 as the managing director in the European leveraged finance business.
