= Big Ben =

Clock tower in London, England

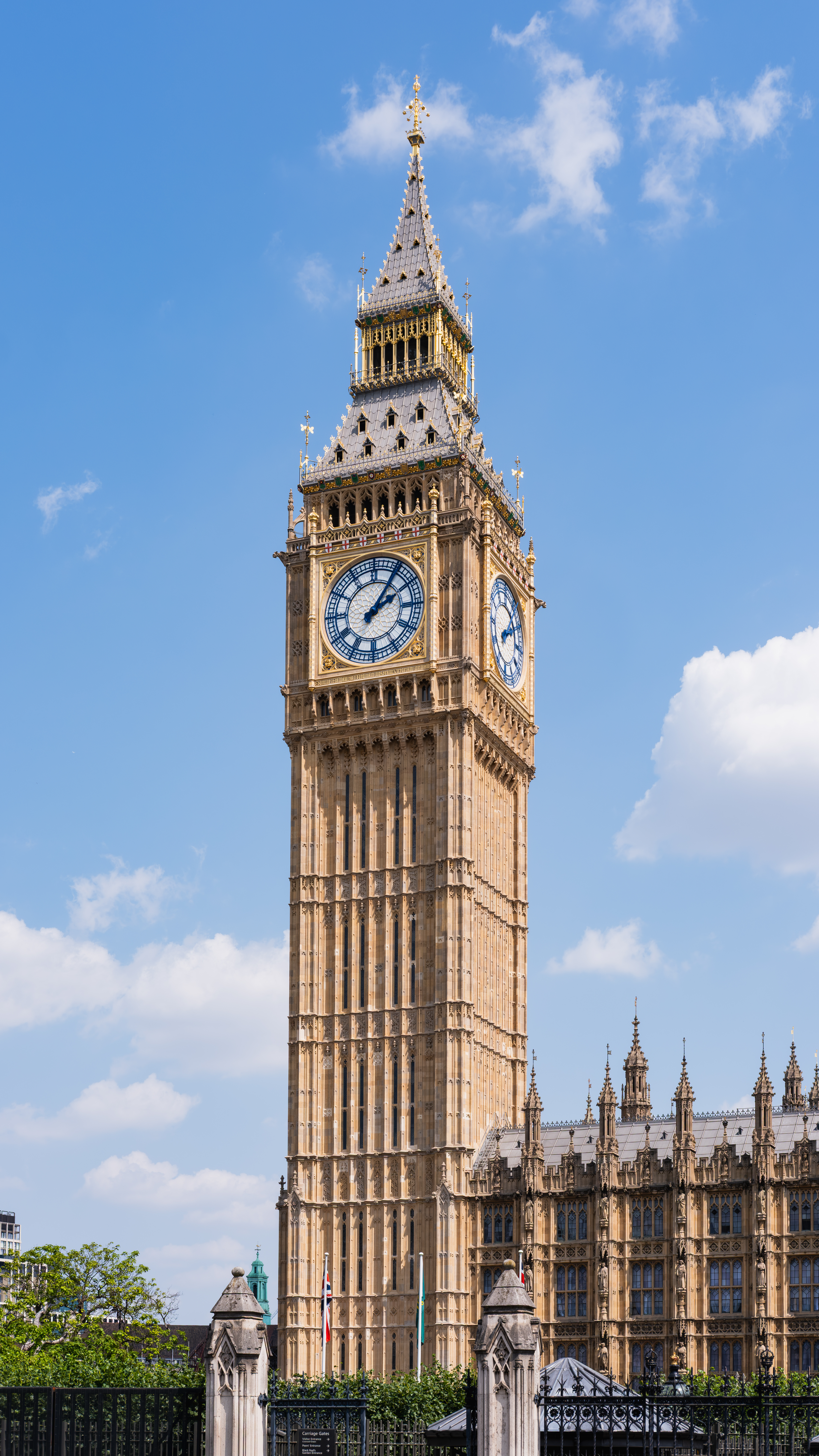
- Big Ben in July 2026, after renovations
- Alternative names: Elizabeth Tower; Clock Tower

General information
- Type: Clock tower
- Architectural style: Gothic Revival
- Location: Westminster, London, England
- Coordinates: 51.5007°N 0.1245°W
- Construction started: 28 September 1843
- Completed: 31 May 1859; 167 years ago

Height
- Height: 316 feet (96 m)

Technical details
- Floor count: 11

Design and construction
- Architects: Charles Barry and Augustus Pugin

Website
- www.parliament.uk/bigben/

Big Ben is the nickname for the Great Bell of the Great Clock of Westminster, and, by extension, for the clock tower that stands at the north end of the Palace of Westminster in London, England. Originally named the Clock Tower, the structure was renamed the Elizabeth Tower in 2012 to mark the Diamond Jubilee of Queen Elizabeth II. The clock is a striking clock with five bells.

The tower was designed by Augustus Pugin and Sir Charles Barry in the Perpendicular Gothic style and was completed in 1859. It is decorated with stone carvings and features symbols related to the four countries of the United Kingdom and the Tudor dynasty. A Latin inscription celebrates Queen Victoria, under whose reign the palace was built. It stands 316 feet (96 m) tall, and the climb from ground level to the belfry is 334 steps. Its base is square, measuring 40 feet (12 m) on each side. The dials of the clock are 22.5 feet (6.9 m) in diameter.

The clock uses its original mechanism and was the largest and most accurate four-faced striking and chiming clock in the world upon its completion. It was designed by Edmund Beckett Denison and George Airy, the Astronomer Royal, and constructed by Edward John Dent and Frederick Dent. It is known for its reliability, and can be adjusted by adding or removing pre-decimal pennies to or from the pendulum. The Great Bell was cast by the Whitechapel Bell Foundry and weighs 13.5 long tons (13.7 tonnes; 15.1 short tons). Its nickname, "Big Ben", derives from the tall Sir Benjamin Hall, who oversaw its installation. There are four quarter bells, which chime on the quarter hours.

Big Ben is a British cultural icon. It is a prominent symbol of Britain and parliamentary democracy, and is often used in the establishing shot of films set in London. The tolling of the bells is broadcast live in the UK on BBC Radio 4 and internationally on both the BBC World Service and online on BBC Sounds twice a day, with an additional broadcast on Sundays. It has been part of a Grade I listed building since 1970, and in 1987 it was designated by UNESCO as a World Heritage Site. The clock and tower were renovated between 2017 and 2021, during which the bells remained silent (with a few exceptions). During this time, the BBC broadcast a recording of the bells on radio in replacement before the news.

== Tower ==
=== History ===
Elizabeth Tower, originally named the Clock Tower, and popularly known as "Big Ben", was built as a part of Charles Barry's design for a new Palace of Westminster after the old palace was largely destroyed by fire on 16 October 1834. Although Barry was the chief architect of the neo-gothic palace, he turned to Augustus Pugin for the design of the Clock Tower, which resembles earlier designs by Pugin, including one for Scarisbrick Hall, a country house in Lancashire. Construction of the tower began on 28 September 1843. The building contractors were Thomas Grissell and Morton Peto. An inscribed trowel in the Parliamentary Archives records that Emily, sister of Peto's daughter-in-law, was given the honour of laying the first stone. It was Pugin's last design before his descent into mental illness and death in 1852, and Pugin himself wrote, at the time of Barry's last visit to him to collect the drawings, "I never worked so hard in my life for Mr Barry for tomorrow I render all my designs for finishing his bell tower and it is beautiful".

=== Design ===
Audio description of the tower by Gary O'Donoghue

Completed in 1859, the tower is designed in Pugin's Gothic Revival style and is 316 feet (96.3 m) high, making it the third-tallest clock tower in Britain. Its dials (at the centre) are 180 feet (54.9 m) above ground level. Its base is square, measuring 40 feet (12.2 m) on each side, resting on concrete foundations 12 feet (3.7 m) thick. It was constructed using bricks clad on the exterior with sand-coloured Anston limestone from South Yorkshire, topped by a spire covered in hundreds of cast iron roof-tiles. There is a spiral staircase with 290 stone steps up to the clock room, followed by 44 to reach the belfry, and an additional 59 to the top of the spire.

Above the belfry and the Ayrton Light are 52 shields decorated with national emblems of the four countries of the UK: the red and white rose of the Tudor dynasty of England, the thistle of Scotland, shamrock of Northern Ireland, and leek of Wales. They also feature the pomegranate of Catherine of Aragon, first wife of the Tudor king Henry VIII; the portcullis, symbolising both Houses of Parliament; and fleurs-de-lis, a legacy from when English monarchs claimed to rule France.

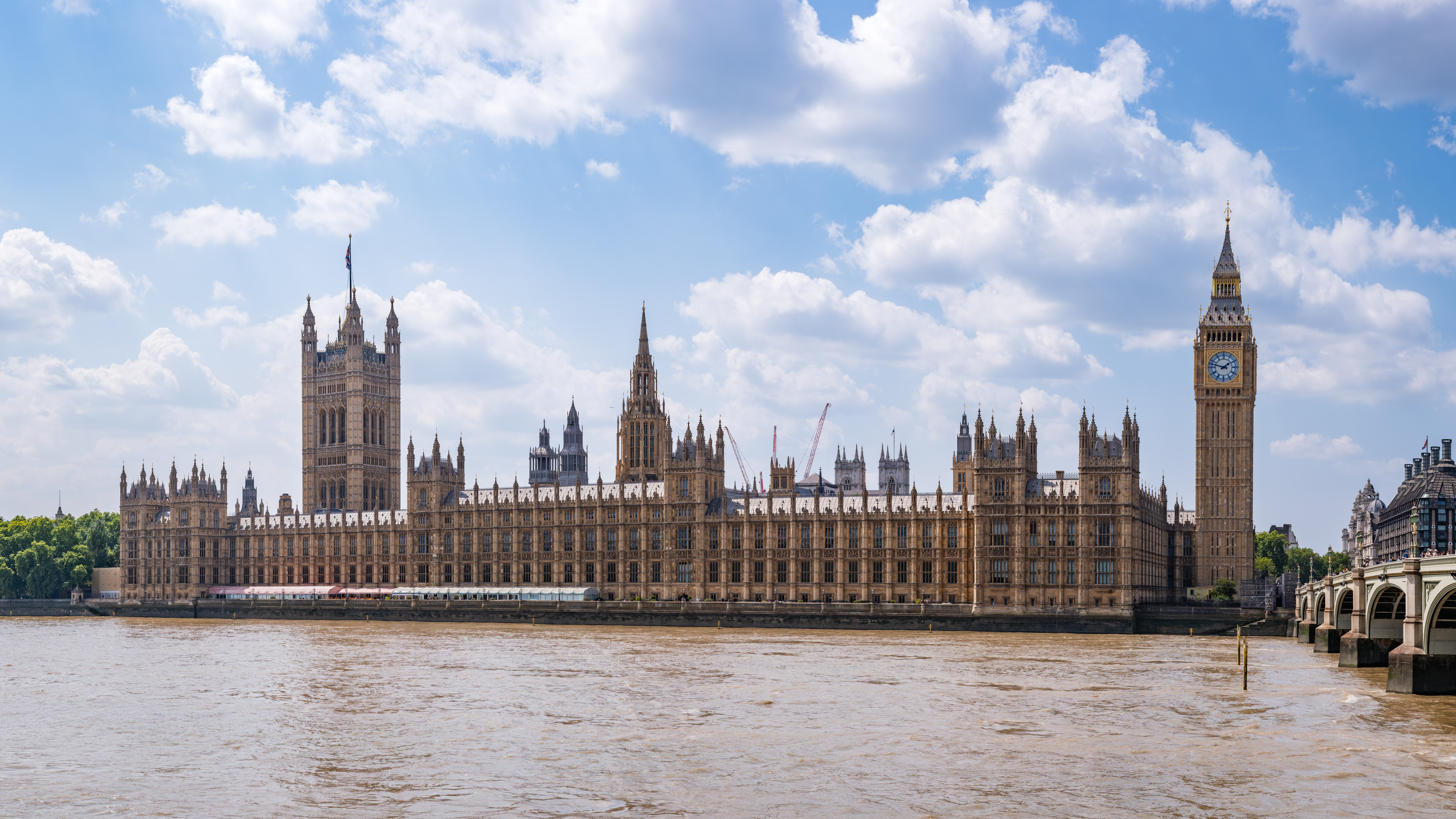
The Palace of Westminster from across the River Thames. Elizabeth Tower is on the right.

A ventilation shaft running from ground level up to the belfry, which measures 16 feet (4.9 m) by 8 feet (2.4 m), was designed by David Boswell Reid, known as "the grandfather of air-conditioning". It was intended to draw cool, fresh air into the Palace of Westminster; in practice this did not work and the shaft was repurposed as a chimney until around 1914. The 2017–2021 conservation works included the addition of a lift in the shaft.

Its foundations rest on a layer of gravel, below which is London Clay. Owing to this soft ground, the tower leans slightly to the north-west by roughly 230 mm (9.1 in) over 55 m height, giving an inclination of approximately 1/240. This includes a planned maximum of 22 mm increased tilt due to tunnelling for the Jubilee Line Extension. In the 1990s thousands of tons of concrete were pumped into the ground underneath the tower to stabilise it during construction of the Westminster section of the Jubilee line of the London Underground. It leans by about 500 mm (20 in) at the finial. Experts believe the leaning will not be a problem for another 4,000 to 10,000 years.

=== Ayrton Light ===
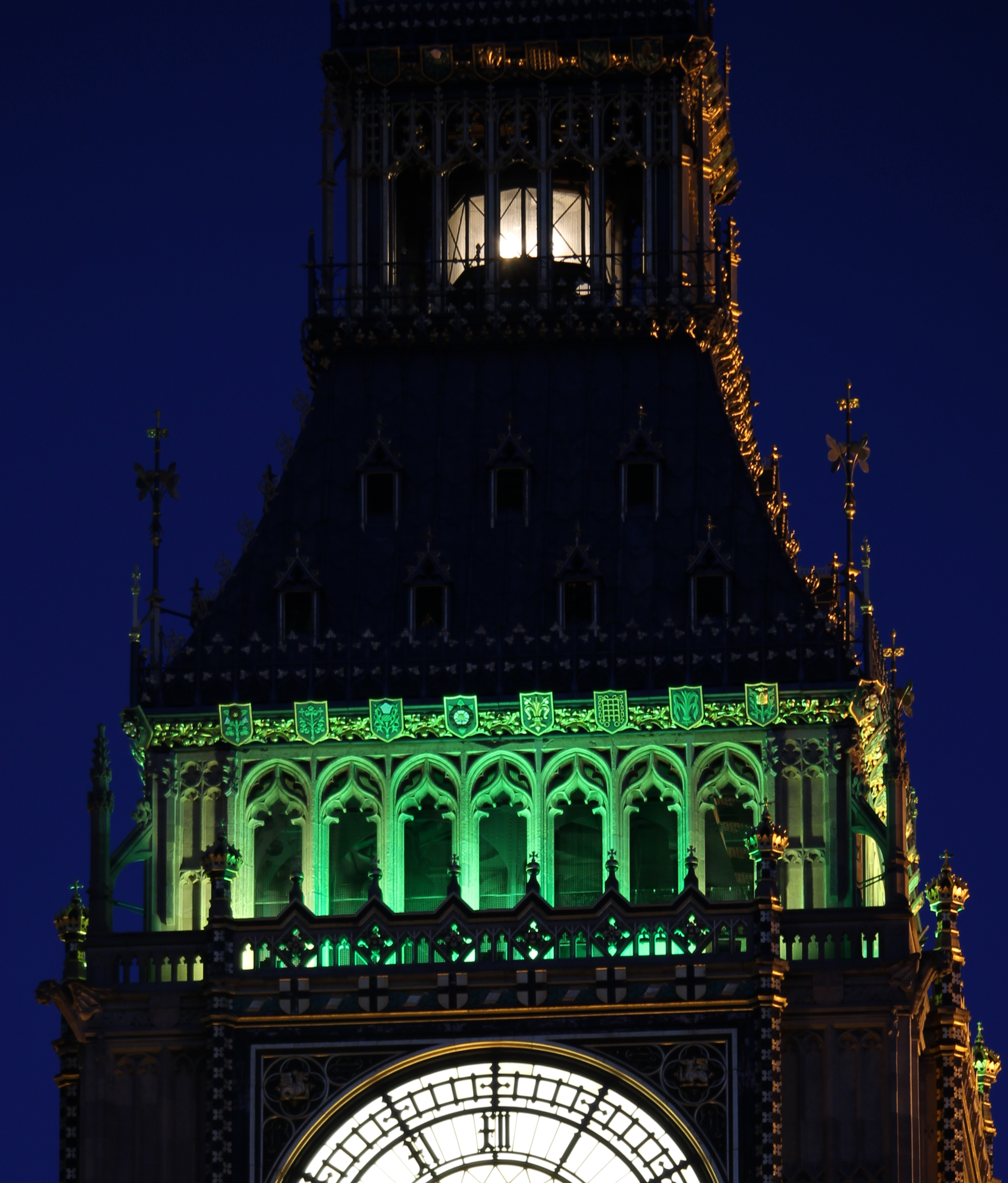
Ayrton Light, above the green-lit belfry

A new feature was added in 1873 by Acton Smee Ayrton, then First Commissioner of Works. The Ayrton Light is a lantern sited above the belfry and is lit whenever the House of Commons sits after dark. It can be seen from across London. Originally, it shone towards Buckingham Palace so Queen Victoria could look out of a window and see when the Commons were at work.

=== Prison Room ===
Inside the tower is an oak-panelled Prison Room, which can only be accessed from the House of Commons, not via the tower entrance. It was last used in 1880 when Charles Bradlaugh, an atheist and the newly elected member of Parliament (MP) for Northampton, was imprisoned by the Serjeant at Arms after he protested against swearing a religious oath of allegiance to Queen Victoria. Officially, the Serjeant at Arms can still make arrests, as they have had the authority to do since 1415. The room, however, is currently occupied by the Petitions Committee, which oversees petitions submitted to Parliament.

=== Name ===
Journalists during Queen Victoria's reign called it St Stephen's Tower. As members of Parliament originally sat at St Stephen's Hall, these journalists referred to anything related to the House of Commons as "news from St Stephens". The Palace does contain a feature called St Stephen's Tower, located above the public entrance. On 2 June 2012 the House of Commons voted in support of a proposal to change the name from the Clock Tower to Elizabeth Tower in commemoration of Queen Elizabeth II in her Diamond Jubilee year, since the large west tower known as Victoria Tower had been renamed in tribute to Queen Victoria on the occasion of her Diamond Jubilee. On 26 June 2012 the Commons confirmed that the name change could proceed. David Cameron, then the prime minister, announced the change of name on 12 September 2012. It was marked by a naming ceremony in which John Bercow, then Speaker of the House of Commons, unveiled a plaque attached to the tower on the adjoining Speaker's Green. Despite the formal name change, the term Big Ben is overwhelmingly used by the general public.

== Clock ==
=== Dials ===
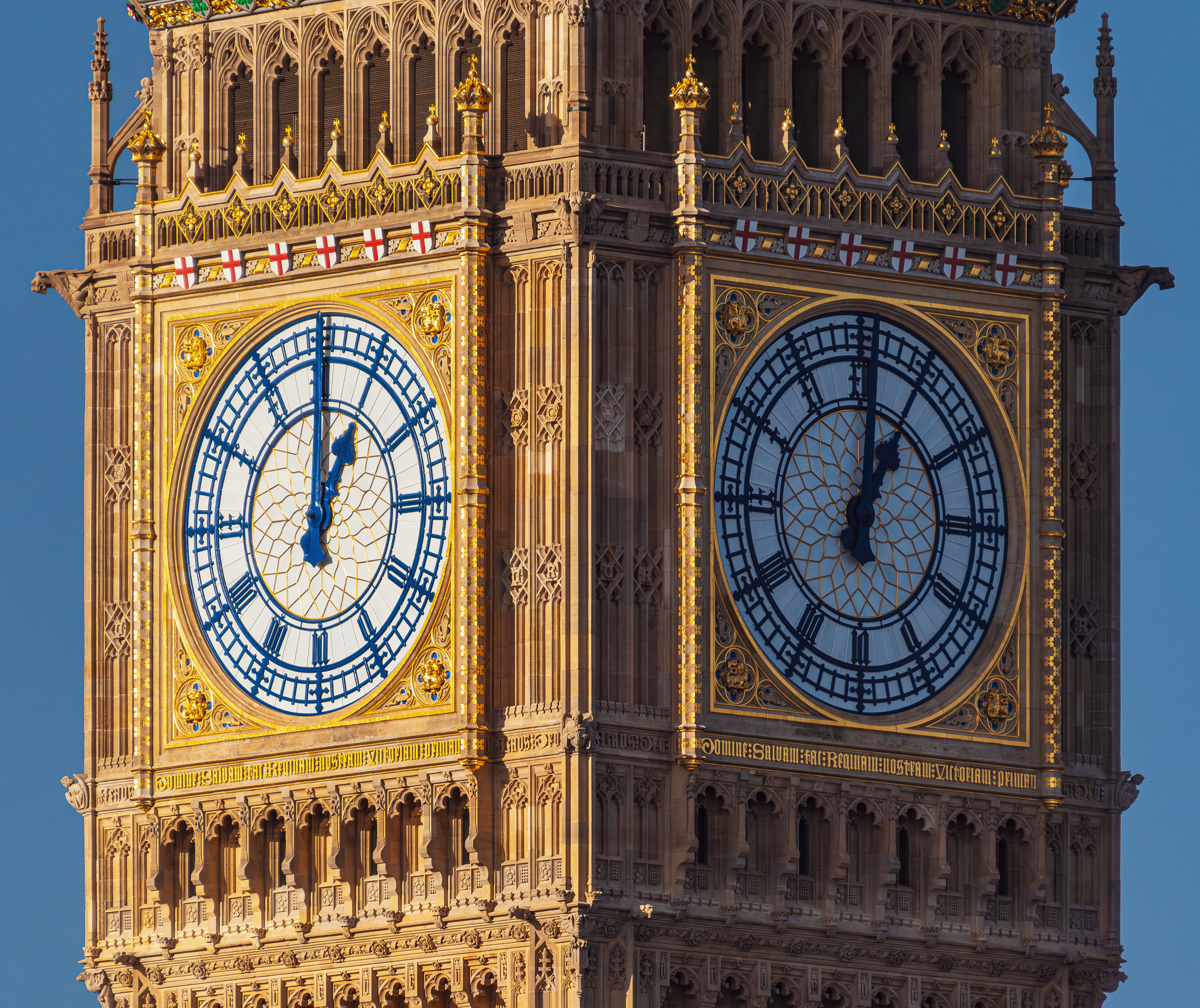
Two restored clock dials in 2023

Augustus Pugin drew inspiration from the clockmaker Benjamin Lewis Vulliamy when he designed the dials. Each is made of cast iron sections bolted together. The whole frame is 22.5 feet (6.9 m) in diameter making them the third-largest in the UK. They each contain 324 pieces of opalescent glass. It has been claimed that no two of the pieces of glass in each dial are the same.

Originally, the dials were backlit using gas lamps, at first only when Parliament was sitting, but they have routinely been illuminated from dusk until dawn since 1876. Electric bulbs were installed at the beginning of the 20th century. The ornate surrounds of the dials are gilded. At the base of each dial is the Latin inscription DOMINE SALVAM FAC REGINAM NOSTRAM VICTORIAM PRIMAM, which means "O Lord, keep safe our Queen Victoria the First". Unlike Roman numeral clock dials that show the "4" position as IIII, the Great Clock faces depict "4" as IV. Its gun metal hour hands and copper minute hands are 8.75 feet (2.7 m) and 14 feet (4.3 m) long respectively.

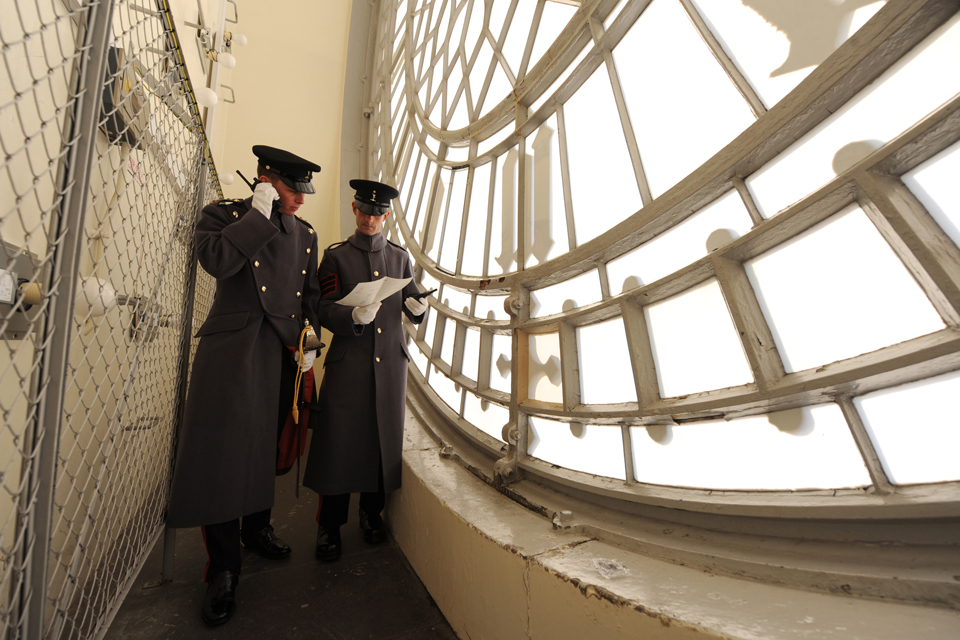
The interior of the clock face in 2012. The men are soldiers of the Royal Signals.

When completed, the dials and clock hands were Prussian blue, but were painted black in the 1930s to disguise the effects of air pollution. The original colour scheme was reinstated during the 2017–2021 conservation work. Analysis of the paint layers found that no fewer than six different colour schemes had been used over the past 160 years. The Victorian glass was also removed and replaced with faithful reproductions made in Germany by the glassmakers Glasfabrik Lamberts.

=== Movement ===
The clock's movement is known for its reliability. The designers were the lawyer and amateur horologist Edmund Beckett Denison and George Airy, the Astronomer Royal. Construction was entrusted to the clockmaker Edward John Dent; after his death in 1853, his stepson Frederick Dent completed the work in 1854. As the tower was not completed until 1859, Denison had time to experiment before its installation in April that year: instead of using a deadbeat escapement and remontoire as originally designed, he invented a double three-legged gravity escapement, which provides the best separation between pendulum and clock mechanism, thus mitigating the effects of rain, wind and snow on the dials. Denison never patented his design, and it quickly became the standard on all new high-quality tower clocks.

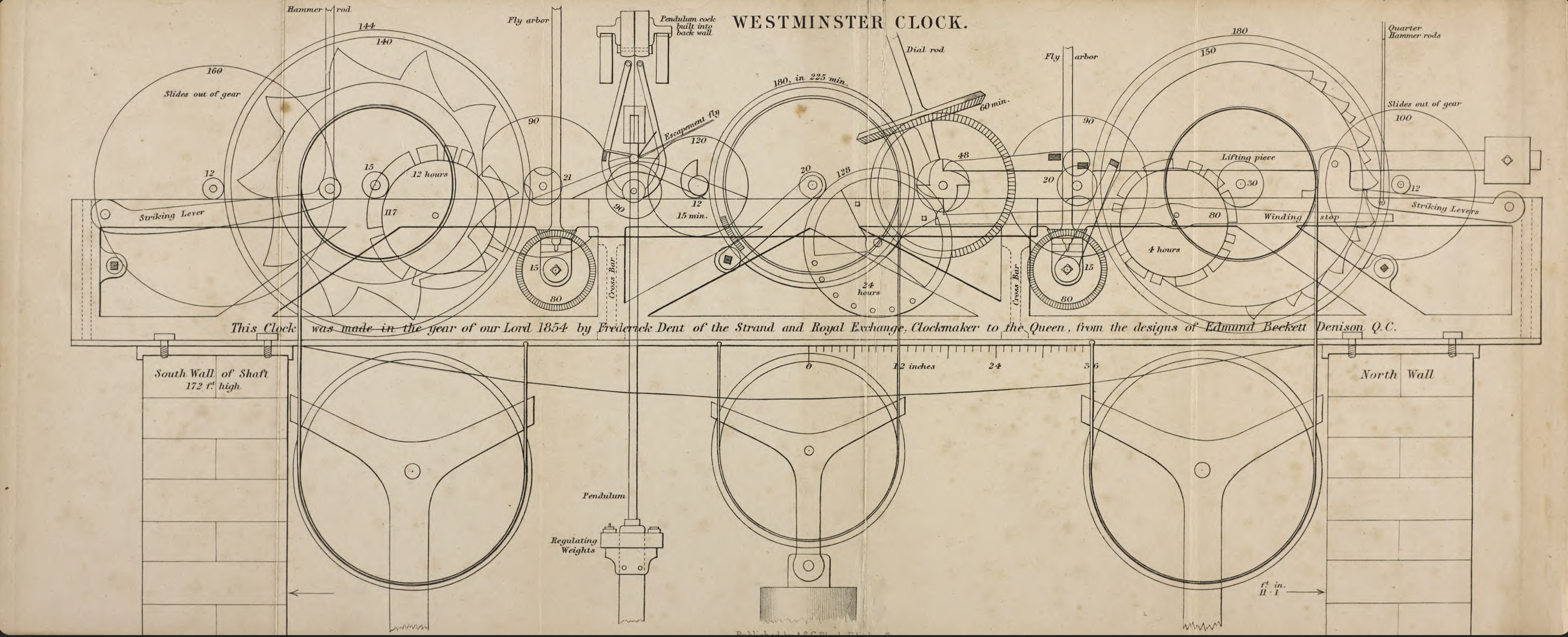
Plan of the clock mechanism, annotated: "This Clock was made in the year of our Lord 1854 by Frederick Dent … from the designs of Edmund Beckett Denison Q.C."

On top of the pendulum is a small stack of pre-decimal penny coins; these are to adjust the time of the clock. Adding a coin has the effect of minutely lifting the position of the pendulum's centre of mass, reducing the effective length of the pendulum rod and hence increasing the rate at which the pendulum swings. Adding or removing a penny will change the clock's speed by 0.4 seconds per day. Other coins have been placed on the pendulum as well; in 2009, three of the pennies were replaced with a £5 commemorative coin minted to celebrate the then-upcoming 2012 Summer Olympics.

Winding the clock mechanism

Big Ben keeps time to within a few seconds per week. It is hand wound (taking about 1.5 hours) three times a week. The Keeper of the Clock is responsible for looking after the movement in addition to overseeing every aspect of maintenance around the Palace. A team of horologists are on call 24 hours a day to attend to the clock in the event of an emergency; they are also responsible for about 300 other clocks in the Palace of Westminster.

On 10 May 1941, the day before the Blitz during the Second World War ended, an air raid by the Luftwaffe of Nazi Germany damaged two of the dials and sections of the tower's stepped roof and destroyed the Commons chamber. The architect Sir Giles Gilbert Scott designed a new five-floor block. Two floors are occupied by the current chamber, which was used for the first time on 26 October 1950. The clock ran accurately and chimed throughout the Blitz.

=== Breakdowns and other incidents ===
==== 19th century ====
- Before 1878: The clock stopped for the first time in its history, "through a heavy fall of snow" on the hands of a clock face.
- 21 August 1877 – January 1878: The clock was stopped for three weeks to allow the tower and mechanism to be cleaned and repaired. The old escape wheel was replaced.

==== 20th century ====
- February 1900: The heavy build-up of snow on a clock face impeded the progress of the hour hand, causing the clock to stop for about eight hours.
- 1916: For two years during the First World War, the bells were silenced and the clock faces were not illuminated at night to avoid guiding attacking Zeppelins of the German Empire. The bells were restored at 11:00 am on 11 November 1918 to mark the end of the war.
- 29 December 1927: Snow build-up on a clock face stopped the clock.
- Winter 1928: Heavy snow stopped the clock for several hours.
- 2 April 1934: The clock stopped from 7:16 am to 1:15 pm, when it was repaired.
- 23 September 1936: A painter in the clock room placed a ladder against a shaft driving the hands, stopping the clock from 8:47 am to 10:00 am.
- 1 September 1939: Although the bells continued to ring, the clock faces were not illuminated at night throughout the Second World War to avoid guiding bomber pilots during the Blitz.

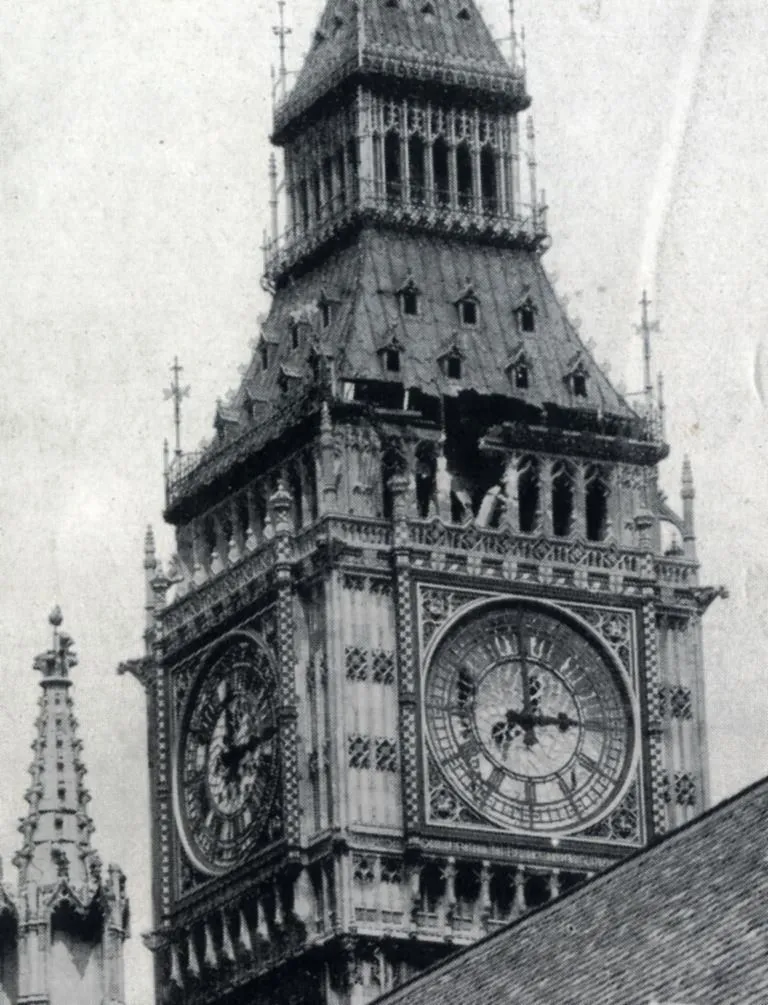
Bomb damage sustained during the Second World War

- 10/11 May 1941: the clock was damaged during a German bombing raid, either by a small bomb or by a British anti-aircraft shell. Stonework and ornamental ironwork were damaged, and the glass on the south dial was shattered. The damage was repaired at the time, but in major refurbishment from 2017 it was found that the tower had sustained greater damage than originally thought, and asbestos, lead paint and broken glass were discovered, increasing the refurbishment cost from an estimated £29 million to nearly £80 million.
- 3–4 June 1941: The clock stopped from 10:13 pm until 10:13 the following morning, after a workman repairing air-raid damage to the clock face left a hammer too close to the mechanism.
- 9 December 1944: The clock hands stopped due to mechanical failure. The broken part—a pendulum suspension spring—was replaced within a few hours.
- 25–26 January 1945: Extremely cold temperatures froze the rubber bushings on the quarter-bell hammers, preventing the chimes sounding from 9:00 pm on the 25th to 9:00 pm the following evening; the BBC broadcast the pips in the interval.
- 28 January 1947: The rubber bushings on the quarter bell hammers again froze before the clock sounded midnight, muting the chimes, though the problem was resolved by the morning.
- 12 August 1949: The clock slowed by four-and-a-half minutes after a flock of starlings perched on the minute hand.
- 13 January 1955: The clock stopped at 3:24 am due to drifts of snow forming on the north and east dials. Small electric heaters were placed just inside these two dials, and this measure has helped to reduce instances of freezing in recent years.
- 18 July 1955: The rope operating the striking hammer broke, silencing the clock from 10:00 am to 5:00 pm.
- New Year's Eve 1962: The clock slowed due to heavy snow and ice on the hands, causing the pendulum to detach from the clockwork, as it is designed to do in such circumstances, to avoid serious damage elsewhere in the mechanism – the pendulum continuing to swing freely. Thus, it chimed-in the 1963 new year nine minutes late.
- 30 January 1965: The bells were silenced during the funeral of Winston Churchill.
- 9 January 1968: Snow buildup on the clock faces blocked the hands from moving, stopping the clock from 6:28 am to 10:10 am.
- 5 August 1976: The air brake speed regulator of the chiming mechanism broke from torsional fatigue after more than 100 years of use, causing the fully wound 4-ton weight to spin the winding drum out of the movement, causing much damage. The clock was shut down for a total of 26 days over nine months – it was reactivated on 9 May 1977. This was the longest break in operation since its construction. During this time BBC Radio 4 broadcast the pips instead. Although there were minor stoppages from 1977 to 2002, when maintenance of the clock was carried out by the old firm of clockmakers Thwaites & Reed, these were often repaired within the permitted two-hour downtime and not recorded as stoppages. Before 1970, maintenance was carried out by the original firm of Dent; since 2002, by parliamentary staff.
- 11 June 1984: Two members of the environmental group Greenpeace scaled the tower and blocked the face for 11 hours.
- March 1986 and January 1987: The problem of the rubber bushings on the quarter bell chimes freezing recurred, muffling the chimes.
- 30 April 1997: The clock stopped 24 hours before the general election, and stopped again three weeks later.

==== 21st century ====
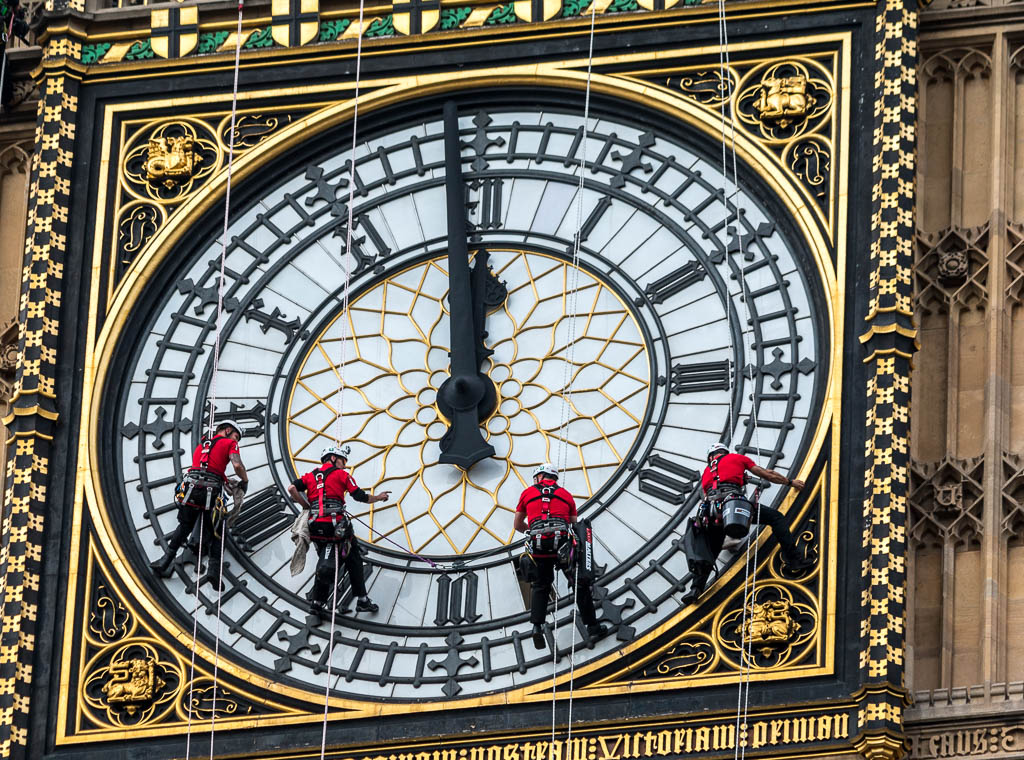
Cleaning of a clock face in 2014

- 20 March 2004: Twenty years after their first scaling of the tower, Greenpeace activists blocked the clock face for seven hours.
- 27 May 2005: The clock stopped at 10:07 pm, possibly because of hot weather; temperatures in London had reached an unseasonable 31.8 °C (89.2 °F). It resumed, but stopped again at 10:20 pm, and remained still for about 90 minutes before resuming.
- 29 October 2005: The mechanism was stopped for about 33 hours to allow maintenance work on the clock and its chimes. It was the lengthiest maintenance shutdown in 22 years.
- 7:00 am on 5 June 2006: The "Quarter Bells" were taken out of commission for four weeks as a bearing holding one of the quarter bells was worn and needed to be removed for repairs. During this period, BBC Radio 4 broadcast recordings of British bird song followed by the pips in place of the usual chimes.
- 11 August 2007: Start of six-week stoppage for maintenance. Bearings in the clock's chime train and the "great bell" striker were replaced, for the first time since installation. During the maintenance the clock was driven by an electric motor. Once again, BBC Radio 4 broadcast the pips during this time. The intention was that the clock should run accurately for a further 200 years before major maintenance is again required; in fact the repairs sufficed for ten years.
- 17 April 2013: The bells were silenced as a mark of "profound dignity and deep respect" during the funeral of the former prime minister, Margaret Thatcher.
- 25 August 2015: Maintenance crews discovered the clock to be running seven seconds fast. They removed coins from its pendulum to correct the error, which caused it to run slow for a period.
- 21 August 2017: Start of a four-year silencing of the chimes during maintenance and repair work to the clock mechanism, and repairs and improvements to the clock tower building. During this time, dials, hands and lights were removed for restoration, with at least one dial – with its hands driven by an electric motor – left intact, functioning, and visible at any given time. A lift was also installed during this renovation.
- 10 May 2023: The clock dials all stopped at 12:55 pm, and Big Ben did not chime at 1:00 pm. The hands restarted, but the clock was five minutes slow until rectified at 1:47 pm.
- 8 March 2025: Daniel Day scaled the side of the tower and sat on a ledge holding a Palestinian flag in protest of the Gaza genocide. He posted videos and photos of his climb on the Internet. Emergency services used a cherry picker to bring him down, ending his 16-hour protest. He pleaded guilty to trespassing on a protected site, and in June 2026 a jury found him guilty of causing a public nuisance.

== Bells ==
=== Big Ben (Great Bell) ===
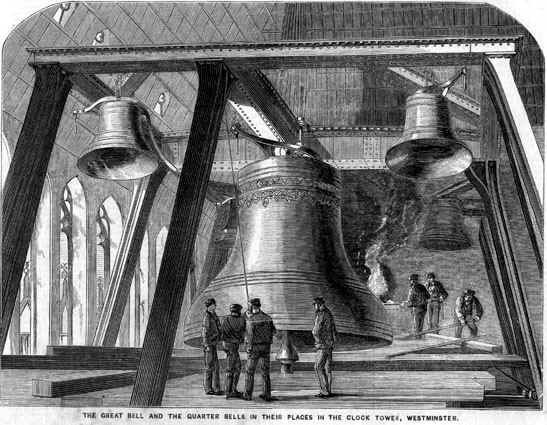
The second "Big Ben" (centre) and the Quarter Bells from The Illustrated News of the World, 1858

The main bell, officially known as the "Great Bell" but better known as Big Ben, is the largest bell in the tower and part of the Great Clock of Westminster. It sounds an E-natural.

The original bell was a 16-ton (16.3-tonne) hour bell, cast on 6 August 1856 in Stockton-on-Tees by John Warner & Sons. It is thought that the bell was originally to be called "Victoria" or "Royal Victoria" in honour of Queen Victoria, but that an MP suggested the bell's current nickname of "Big Ben" during a Parliamentary debate; the comment is not recorded in Hansard.

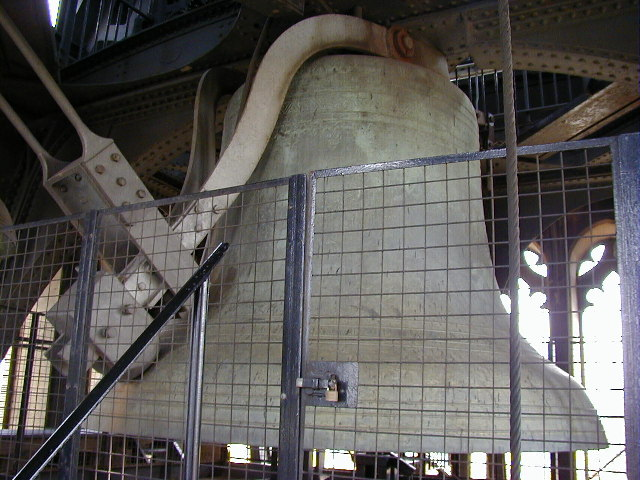
The Great bell in 2001

Since the tower was not yet finished, the bell was mounted in New Palace Yard but, during testing, it cracked beyond repair and a replacement had to be made. The bell was recast on 10 April 1858 at the Whitechapel Bell Foundry as a 13.5-ton (13.76-tonne) bell. The second bell was transported from the foundry to the tower on a trolley drawn by sixteen horses, with crowds cheering its progress; it was then pulled 200 ft (61.0 m) up to the Clock Tower's belfry, a feat that took 18 hours. It is 7 feet 6 inches (2.29 m) tall and 9 feet (2.74 m) diameter. This new bell first chimed on 11 July 1859; in September it too cracked under the hammer. According to the foundry's manager, George Mears, the horologist Denison had used a hammer more than twice the maximum weight specified. For three years Big Ben was taken out of commission and the hours were struck on the lowest of the quarter bells until it was repaired. To make the repair, a square piece of metal was chipped out from the rim around the crack, and the bell given an eighth of a turn so the new hammer struck in a different place. Big Ben has chimed with a slightly different tone ever since, and is still in use today with the crack unrepaired. Big Ben was the largest bell in the British Isles until "Great Paul", a 16.75-ton (17 tonne) bell currently hung in St Paul's Cathedral, was cast in 1881.

In August 2007 the striker was replaced for the first time since installation. The current striker weighs 440 lb (200 kg) and is operated by the clock mechanism. When it hits the bell, it generates a sound 110–115 decibels in intensity within the tower, making ear protection a must for any technicians working there.

==== Nickname ====
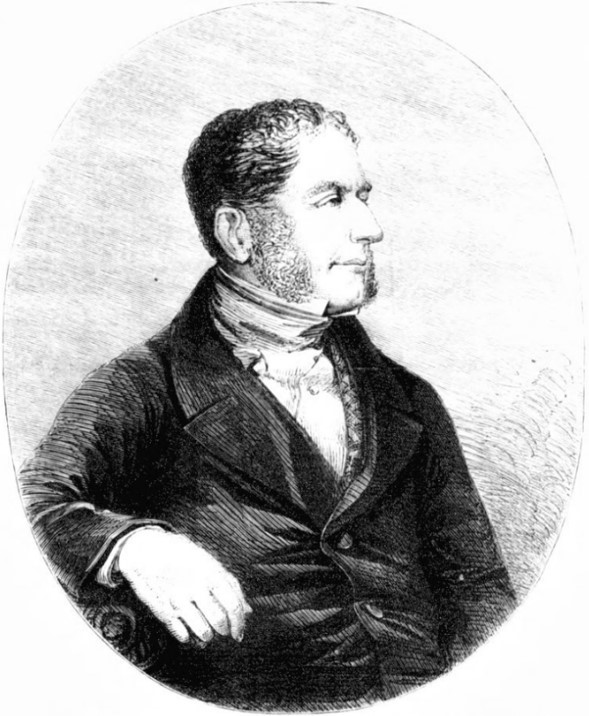
The Right Honourable Sir Benjamin Hall, Minister of Public Works, January 1858.

The origin of the nickname "Big Ben" has been the subject of some debate. The nickname was applied first to the Great Bell, and there is debate as to whether it was named after Sir Benjamin Hall, who as Minister for Public Works oversaw the installation of the Great Bell, or after the English heavyweight boxing champion Ben Caunt, who had also been nicknamed "Big Ben". Nonetheless, several newspapers from the late 1850s suggested that the name was originally a reference to Hall. "Big Ben" is now often used to refer to the bell, the clock, and the tower collectively, although it is not universally accepted as referring to the clock and tower. Some authors of works about the tower, clock and bell sidestep the issue by using the words Big Ben first in the title, then going on to clarify that the subject of the book is the clock and tower as well as the bell.

=== Chimes ===
Along with the Great Bell, the belfry houses four quarter bells which play the Westminster Quarters on the quarter hours. The four quarter bells sound G♯, F♯, E, and B. They were cast by John Warner & Sons at their Crescent Foundry in 1857 (G♯, F♯ and B) and 1858 (E). The Foundry was in Jewin Crescent, in what is now known as the Barbican, in the City of London. Like the Great Bell, the quarter bells are operated by the clock mechanism. Their sounds are generated by hammers pulled by cables coming from the link room—a low-ceiling space between the clock room and the belfry—where they are triggered by cables coming from the chime train.

The quarter bells play a once-repeating, 20-note sequence of rounds and four changes in the key of E major: 1–4 at quarter past, 5–12 at half past, 13–20 and 1–4 at quarter to, and 5–20 on the hour (which sounds 25 seconds before the main bell tolls the hour). Because the low bell (B) is struck twice in quick succession, there is not enough time to pull a hammer back, and it is supplied with two wrench hammers on opposite sides of the bell. The tune is that of the Cambridge Chimes, first used for the chimes of Great St Mary's church, Cambridge, and supposedly a variation, attributed to William Crotch, based on violin phrases from the air "I know that my Redeemer liveth" in George Frideric Handel's Messiah. The notional words of the chime, again derived from Great St Mary's and in turn an allusion to Psalm 37:23–24, are: "All through this hour/Lord be my guide/And by Thy power/No foot shall slide". They are written on a plaque on the wall of the clock room.

One of the requirements for the clock was that the first stroke of the hour bell should be correct to within one second per day. The tolerance is with reference to Greenwich Mean Time (BST in summer). So, at twelve o'clock, for example, it is the first of the twelve hour-bell strikes that signifies the hour (the New Year on New Year's Eve at midnight). The time signalled by the last of the "six pips" (UTC) may be fractionally different.

On 13 November 2022, Remembrance Sunday, the chimes of Big Ben returned to regular service for the first time since August 2017, preceding the hour bell being sounded at 11:00 am local time, the first hour strike marking the beginning of two minutes of silence.

== Cultural significance ==
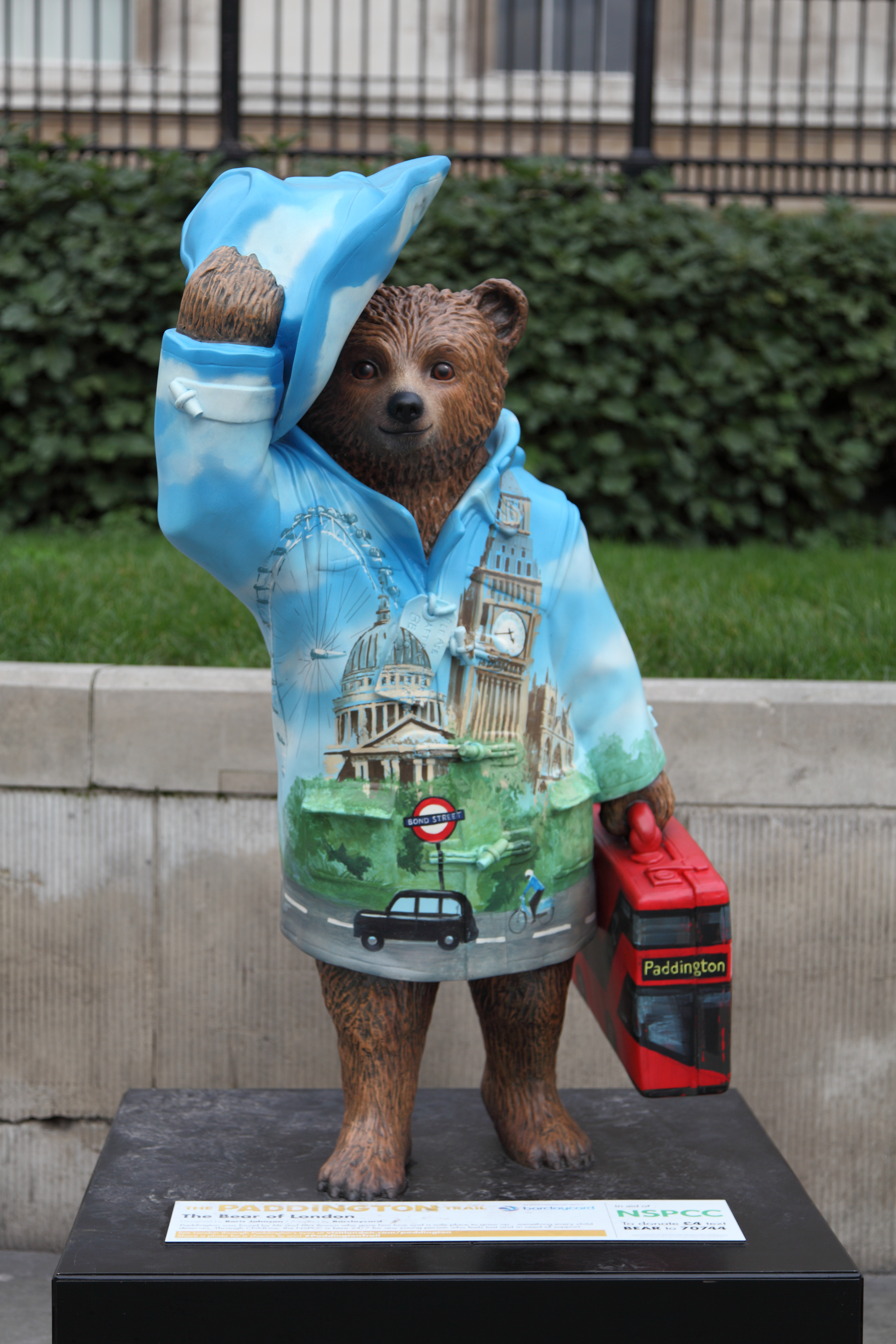
A London-themed Paddington Bear statue, featuring Big Ben, located outside the National Gallery in Trafalgar Square in 2014

The clock has become a cultural symbol of the United Kingdom, particularly in the visual media. When a television or film-maker wishes to indicate a generic location in the country, a popular way to do so is to show an image of the tower, often with a red double-decker bus or black cab in the foreground.

In 2008 a survey of 2,000 people found that the tower was the most popular landmark in Britain. It has also been named as the most iconic film location in London.

The sound of the clock chiming has also been used this way in audio media; the Westminster Quarters are imitated by other clocks and other devices, but the sound of Big Ben is preferred as the original and best. Big Ben is a focal point of New Year celebrations in the United Kingdom, with radio and television stations airing its chimes to welcome the start of the New Year. To welcome in 2012, the clock tower was lit with fireworks that exploded at every toll of Big Ben. On New Year's Eve 2024, the bell struck midnight within about five-thousandths of a second of the correct time.

Similarly, on Remembrance Day, the chimes are broadcast to mark the 11th hour of the 11th day of the 11th month and the start of the two minutes' silence.

In 1999, prior to the millennium New Year, a recording of the clock was released by London Records under the title "Millennium Chimes", with the artist labelled as Big Ben. It reached number 53 for the week ending 8 January 2000 (which included purchases prior to 31 December 1999).

The chimes of Big Ben have also been used at the state funerals of monarchs on four occasions, chiming one stroke for each year of the monarch's life: firstly, at the funeral of King Edward VII in 1910 (68 strokes); secondly, at the funeral of King George V in 1936 (70 strokes); thirdly, at the funeral of King George VI in 1952 (56 strokes); and lastly, at the funeral of Queen Elizabeth II in 2022 (96 strokes).

ITN's News at Ten's opening sequence, broadcast on the ITV network, formerly featured an image of the tower with the sound of Big Ben's chimes punctuating the announcement of the news headlines of the day. Since 1999, a recording of the Big Ben chimes (known within ITN as "The Bongs") are still played during the headlines at 10 pm and all ITV News bulletins use a graphic based on the Westminster clock dial, which first debuted four years ago. (Note: The recorded "bongs" are played between each headline, and do not ring at the same tempo as the Great Bell in the tower.)

Big Ben can also be heard live striking the hour (along with the quarter bells preceding it) at the start of some news bulletins on BBC Radio 4 every day (6 p.m. and midnight, plus 10 pm on Sundays) and the BBC World Service, a practice that began on 31 December 1923. Additionally, since the launch of audio streaming and internet radio service BBC Sounds, the bells are broadcast internationally online as well. The sound of the chimes is broadcast from a microphone permanently installed in the tower and connected by line to Broadcasting House. On some occasions, Londoners who live an appropriate distance from the tower and Big Ben can, by means of listening to the chimes both live and on analogue radio, hear the bell strike thirteen times. This is possible because the electronically transmitted chimes arrive virtually instantaneously, while the "live" sound is delayed travelling through the air since the speed of sound is relatively slow. (Note: If listened to on analogue radio (AM or FM, among others), the broadcast is truly live aside from a negligible delay as radio waves travel at the speed of light. On digital radio and internet audio streaming, there is a delay, more so with the latter.)

At the close of the polls for the 2010 general election the results of the national exit poll were projected onto the south side of the tower. On 27 July 2012, starting at 8:12 am, Big Ben chimed 30 times, to welcome the Games of the 30th Olympiad, which officially began that day, to London.

== 2017–2021 restoration ==
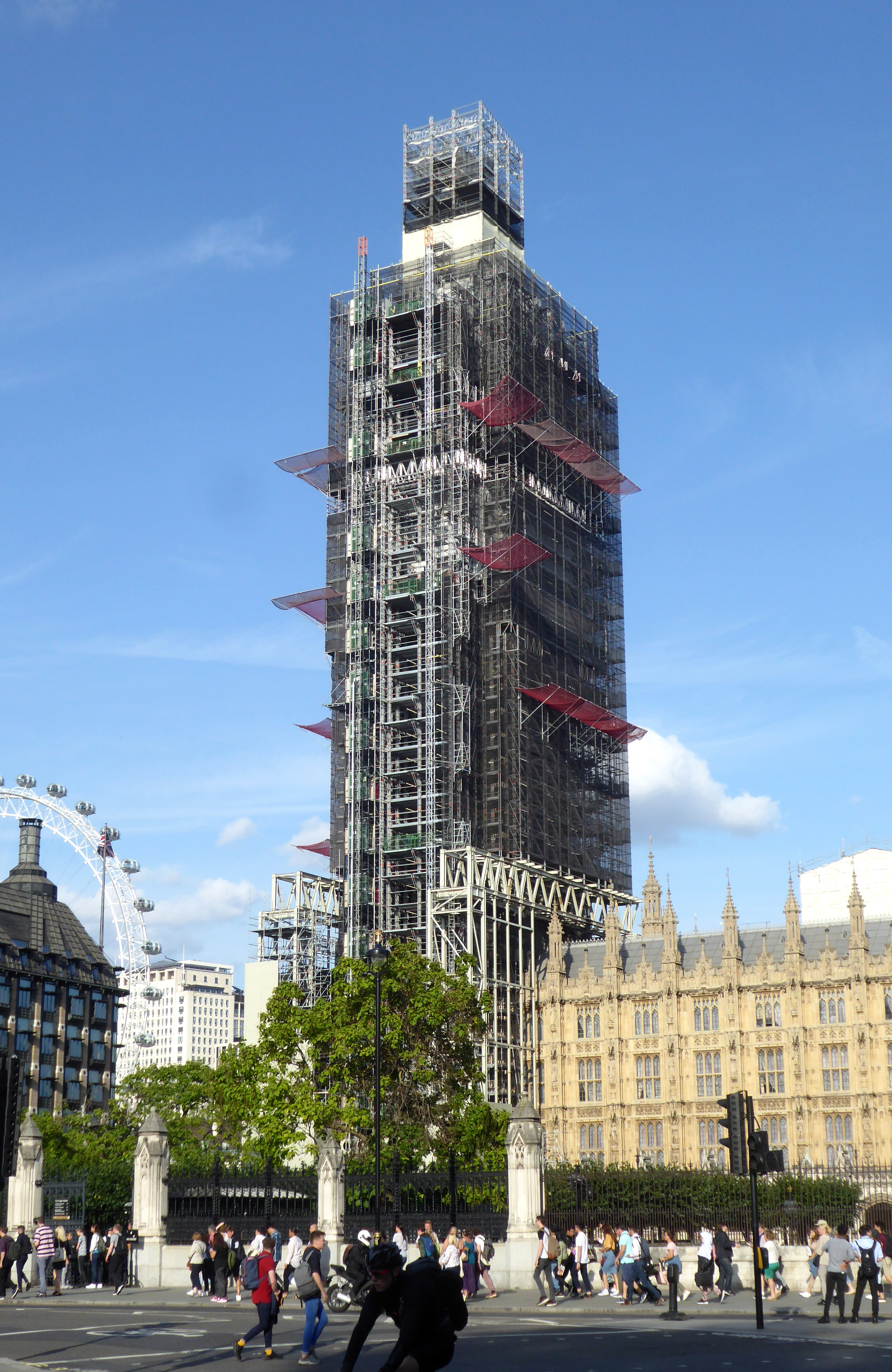
Scaffolding erected in 2017 to allow worker access

On 21 August 2017, the chimes fell silent for four years to allow essential restoration work to be carried out on the tower. The decision to silence the bells was made to protect the hearing of the workers on the tower, and was criticised by senior MPs and Prime Minister Theresa May. The striking and tolling of the bells for important occasions, such as New Year's Eve and Remembrance Sunday, was powered by an electric motor. At least one of the four clock faces always remained visible during the restoration. Scaffolding was put up around the tower immediately after the bells were silenced. The cost of the project was originally estimated to be roughly £29 million (equivalent to £37.2 million in 2024), but it more than doubled, to £69 million (equivalent to £80.9 million in 2024).

In February 2020, the renovations revealed that the Elizabeth Tower had sustained greater damage than previously thought from the May 1941 bombing raid that destroyed the adjacent Commons chamber. Other costly discoveries included asbestos in the belfry, the extensive use of lead paint, broken glass on the clock dials, and serious deterioration to intricate stone carvings due to air pollution. The cost of addressing these problems was estimated at £18.6 million (equivalent to £21.8 million in 2024), bringing the restoration budget to nearly £80 million (£93.8 million in 2024).

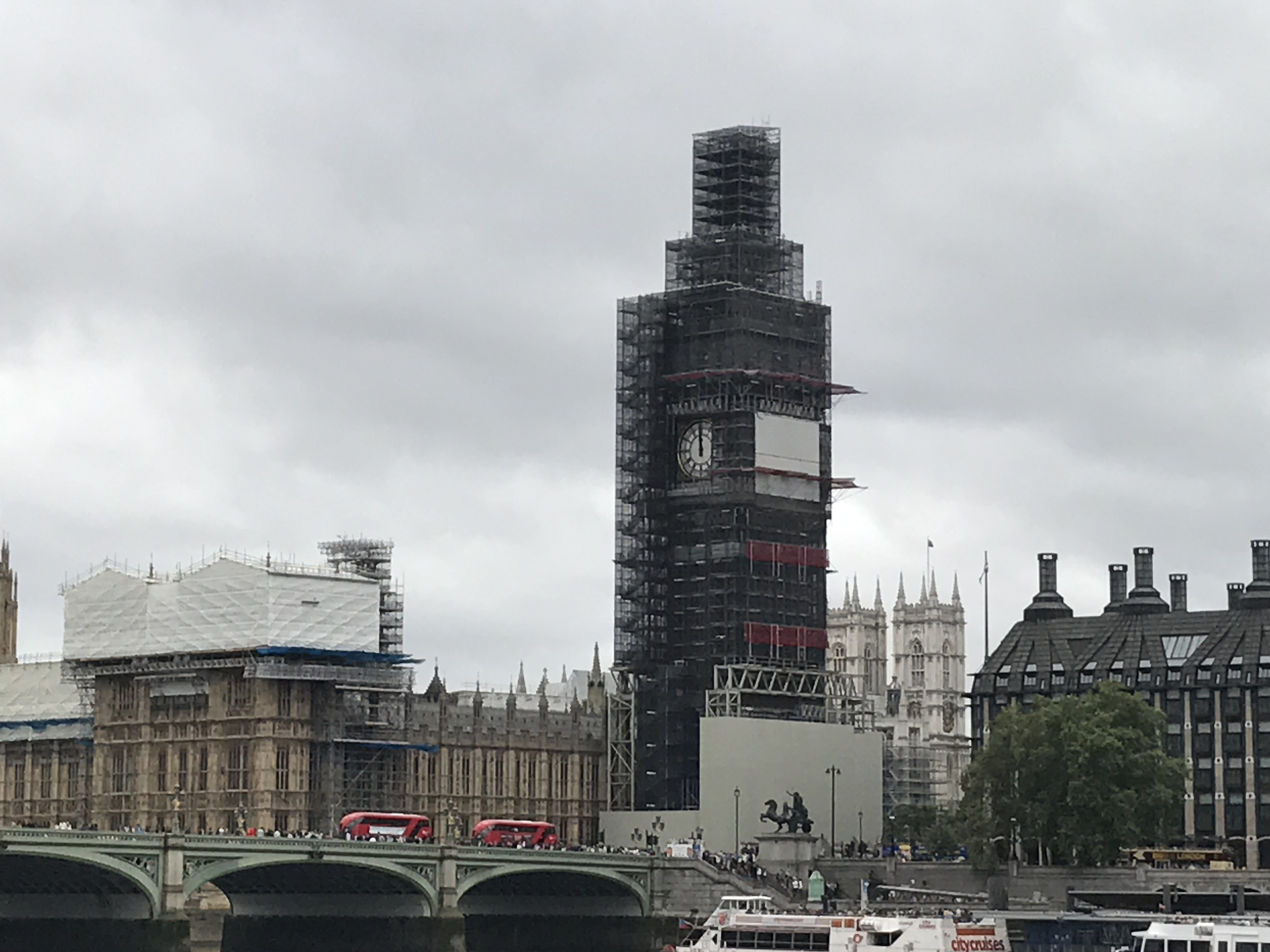
Big Ben in scaffolding, 2018

The 2,567 cast-iron roof tiles were removed and refurbished, and a lift was installed to make access easier, along with a basic toilet facility with running water, for the first time in the tower itself. The Ayrton Light at the top of the tower, which is lit when Parliament is sitting, was also fully dismantled and restored along with the other lights in the Belfry, being replaced with low-energy LEDs. One of the most visible changes to the tower has been the restoration of the clock-face framework to its original colour of Prussian blue, used when the tower was first built in 1859, with the black paint that was used to cover up the soot-stained dial frames having been stripped away. The clock faces were regilded, and the shields of Saint George repainted in their original red and white colours. The 1,296 pieces of glass that make up the clock faces have also been removed and replaced.

In December 2021, after four years of renovations and restoration, the tower emerged from behind its scaffolding in time for the ringing in of the new year. In April 2022, the gantry supporting the scaffolding was removed.

In September 2025, the restoration of the tower was shortlisted for the Stirling Prize. It also won a RIBA National Award.

== See also ==
- Big Ben Aden; a 22-metre replica built in 1890
- Kolkata Time Zone Tower in Lake Town, Kolkata, India; a 30-metre replica built in 2015
- Little Ben; a smaller 1892 clock tower near London Victoria station

== Bibliography ==
- Fowler, H. W. (1976). The Concise Oxford dictionary of current English (6th ed.). Clarendon Press. ISBN 978-0-19-861121-9.
- Good, Richard (1996). Victorian Clocks. British Museum Press. ISBN 978-0-7141-0578-9.
- Hill, Rosemary (2009). God's Architect: Pugin & the Building of Romantic Britain. Yale University Press. ASIN B008W30TJO.
- Lockyer, Herbert (1993). A Devotional Commentary on Psalms. Kregel Christian Books. ISBN 978-0-8254-9742-1.
- McKay, Chris (2010). Big Ben: the Great Clock and the Bells at the Palace of Westminster. Oxford University Press. ISBN 978-0-19-958569-4.
- Weinreb, Ben; Hibbert, Christopher (2011). "Big Ben". The London Encyclopaedia (3rd ed.). Macmillan. ISBN 978-0-2307-3878-2.
