= Al Buraiqah district =

Al Buraiqah district مديرية البريقة
- District
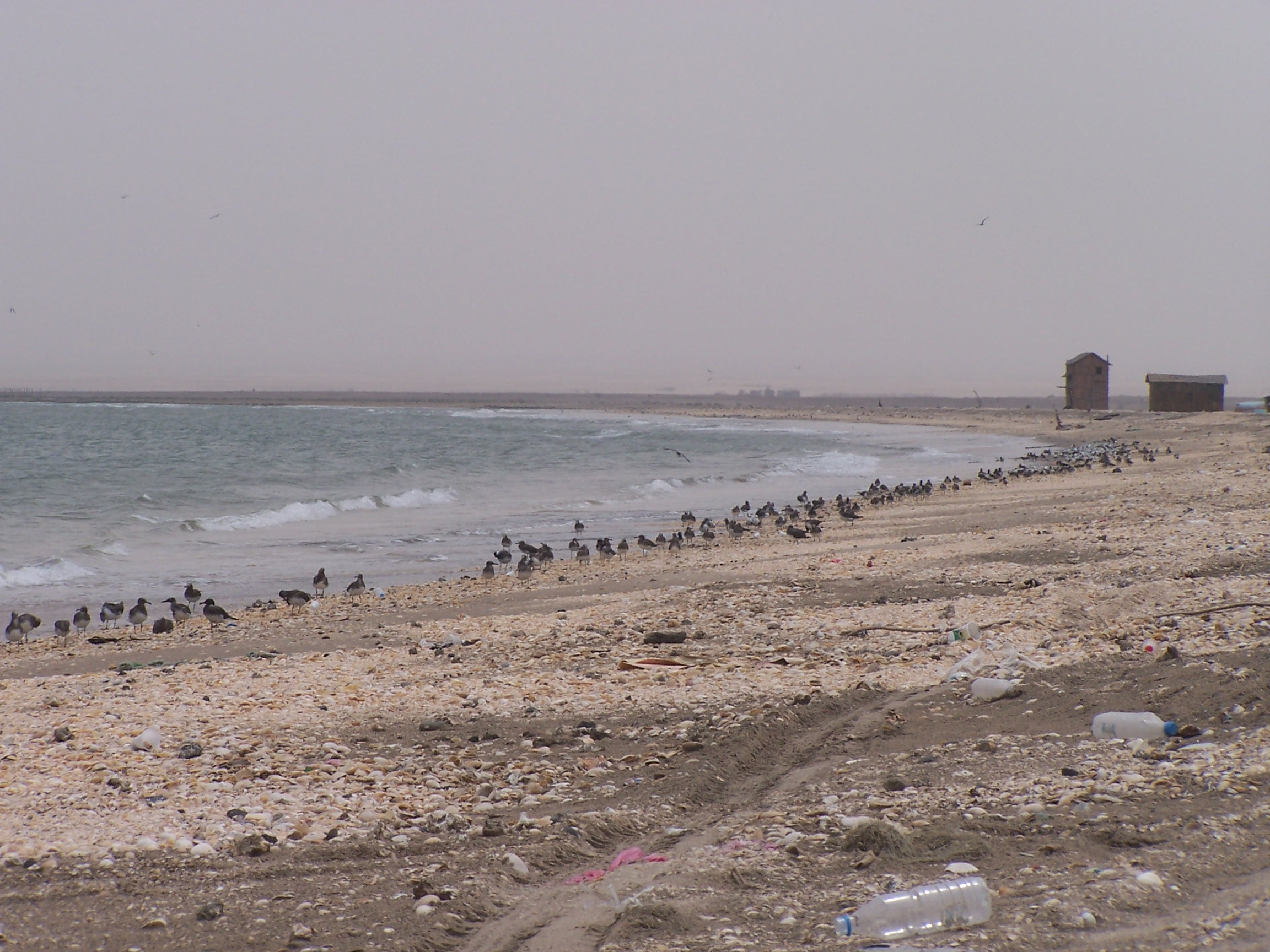
- View from the coast of the Gulf of Aden in the Al Buraiqah district in 2003

- Location in Yemen
- Coordinates: 12.8036°N 44.7761°E
- Country: Yemen
- Governorate: Aden

Population (2003)
  - Total: 62,405
- Time zone: UTC+3 (Yemen Standard Time)

Al Buraiqah, or Al Burayqah, (Note: Also Bureika, Al Buraiqeh.) is a district of the Aden Governorate, Yemen. As of 2003, the district had a population of 62,405 inhabitants.
