= Abu Bilal al-Harbi =

Saudi governor of Yemen's Islamic State branch

- Born: Nasir Muhammad 'Awad al-Ghidan al-Harbi; 20 July 1974; Al-Qassim Region, Saudi Arabia
- Died: 16 October 2017 (aged 43); Yemen
- Other names: Abu Bilal al-Ghaydani, Hammam al-Najdi, Ra'i al-Ras

Nasir Muhammad 'Awad al-Ghidan al-Harbi (20 July 1974 - 16 October 2017), known by his kunya Abu Bilal al-Harbi, was a Saudi Arabian citizen who was the governor of the Islamic State's branch in Yemen.

== Biography ==
He was born in Al-Qassim Region, Saudi Arabia on either 20 July or 5 September 1974.

In September 2014, he established contact with IS and sought pledges of allegiance on their behalf. In late 2014, he allegedly facilitated the movement of people and material for IS operations in Saudi Arabia. According to the Treasury, he "was in Yemen with a group that pledged allegiance to ISIL and received significant funding from either ISIL or an unidentified donor".

According to the United States Department of the Treasury, he recruited for the Islamic State in Yemen in mid-2015 having received funding from IS in 2014 to implement their plan in Yemen. He declined to recruit and facilitate efforts in Yemen on behalf of Al-Qaeda in the Arabian Peninsula in favor of an alleged promise of 4,000 al-Qaeda in the Islamic Maghreb fighters by Abu Bakr al-Baghdadi.

=== Leadership disputes in Yemen ===
In December 2015, he suffered a rebellion against his rule as governor by members of the Islamic State in Yemen, who appealed to the Islamic State leadership in Syria and Iraq to replace him. Seventy members announced their defection in a letter published online, though they reaffirmed their allegiance to Abu Bakr al-Baghdadi.

The authors accused him and his "inner circle" of committing "excesses and violations against sharia." Despite our efforts to advise and inform the caliph's office on matters happening in Yemen, the violations against the sharia remain present and continue to increase," the letter continued. "They stopped working in accordance with the prophetic path regarding the resolution of many problems and issues."

The letter further listed three violations of sharia supposedly committed by Abu Bilal; the wrongful "dismissal of a number of soldiers" after they filed a complaint, a failure to provide "basic resources" during a battle in Hadhramaut Governorate, and the refusal to submit to a sharia ruling against a regional commander. Additional accusations were made of "oppressing the downtrodden" and "expelling the muhajireen". They then demanded that Baghdadi dismiss the governor for Yemen, along with "his retinue."

Abu Ubaydah Abd al-Hakim, a member of the consultative council of the Islamic State responded, rejecting the request to remove the governor and saying, "What you have ventured to do is absolutely rejected. You must hear and obey he who has been tasked with your emirate, and you tasked by his emiracy over you".

=== US sanctions ===
He was sanctioned by the United States Department of the Treasury on 29 September 2015.

== Death ==
In 2017, videos lamenting Abu Bilal al-Harbi's death were circulated by the Islamic State – Yemen Province, implying he had died.
