= Al-Mansoura (Aden) =

Coordinates: 12.8531°N 44.9722°E

Al Mansura District مديرية المنصورة
- District
- Interactive map of Al Mansura District
- Country: Yemen
- Governorate: Aden

Population (2003)
  - Total: 114,931
- Time zone: UTC+3 (Yemen Standard Time)

Al Mansoora (Arabic: المنصورة, romanized: Al Manşūrah) is a city district in Aden Governorate, Yemen, with a population of 114,931 according to the 2003 census.

== History ==
Al Mansoura was named after a resolution made by Legislative Council of Aden in 1962. The construction of the neighbourhood is associated with the acute housing crisis in the colony of Aden between 1955 and 1962 as a result of the increasing population and expanding British Military Base.

== Mansoura prison ==
One of the most important architectural landmarks is Mansoura prison built by the Colonial Government of Aden, between 1962 and 1963, as a political prison for the detention of activists and partisans of the Liberation Army and the armed revolution, currently in prison for the continued unity of the Yemeni Central Security.
