= Tawahi =

Coordinates: 12°47′N 44°59′E

Tawahi District مديرية التواهي
- District
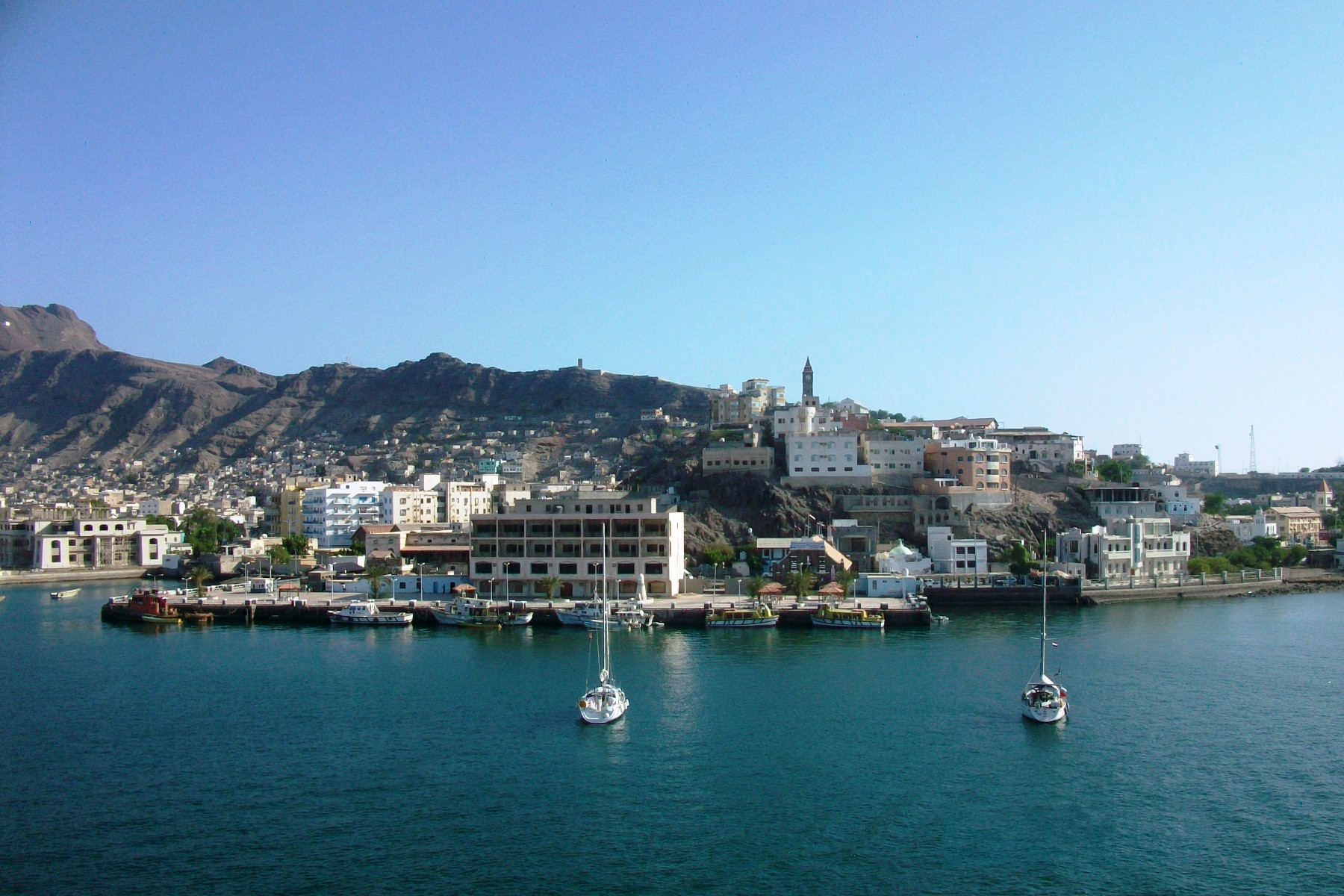
- Interactive map of Tawahi District
- Country: Yemen
- Governorate: Aden Governorate

Population (2004)
  - Total: 52,984
- Time zone: UTC+3 (Yemen Standard Time)

Tawahi (Arabic: مديرية التواهي, romanized: At Tawāhī) is a city district in the city of Aden, located in the Aden Governorate in Yemen.

== Etymology & History ==
The name Al-Tawahi is derived from the anglicized local Adeni dialect pronunciation of the word suburbs (Arabic: الضواحي), the Tawahi district became known as "Steamer Point" during Aden's time as a British colony. It was urbanized by the British and planned as a modern port and was part of Aden Settlement.

== Population ==
Its population in 2004 was about 52,984.

== Notable people ==
- David Buggé (born 1956), English cricketer and banker
