= Aden Governorate =

Governorate of Yemen

Coordinates: 12°54′N 44°55′E

Aden محافظة عدن
- Governorate
- Country: Yemen
- Seat: Aden

Government
  - Governor: Ahmed Lamlas

Area
  - Total: 750 km^{2} (290 sq mi)

Population (2025 est.)
  - Total: 1,248,228
  - Density: 1,700/km^{2} (4,300/sq mi)

Aden (Arabic: عَدَنْ) is one of the governorates of Yemen. Located in the Gulf of Aden, it is approximately 363 km (226 mi) from the national capital Sana'a. It covers an area of approximately 750 km^{2} (290 sq mi) and is subdivided into eight districts. Its seat is Aden, which served as the capital of the erstwhile People's Democratic Republic of Yemen and serves as the Yemen's internationally recognized government since 2015. According to the 2004 census, it had a population of 589,419, and had an estimated population of 1,248,228 in 2025.

== History ==
Aden is mentioned in the Book of Ezekiel. It has historically been an important port on the southern coast of the Arabian Peninsula as a part of maritime trade route linking the Indian Ocean and the Mediterranean Sea. It further flourished from the 12th to 16th centuries before declining under the Ottoman Empire. In 1839, the British occupied Aden, which subsequently developed Aden into a major hub en route to India. Aden was became a Crown Colony in 1937 and the Little Aden oil refinery began operations in 1954. In 1963, it joined the Federation of South Arabia. Following the Aden Emergency and the British withdrawal, Aden became the capital of the independent People's Democratic Republic of Yemen on 30 November 1967. It subsequently became part of the unified Republic of Yemen in 1990.

Since 2015, Aden has served as the temporary capital of the internationally recognised Yemeni government following the capture of Sana'a by Houthi forces during the Yemeni Civil War. On 6 December 2015, the governor of Aden, Jaafar Mohammed Saad, was killed in a car bomb attack by the Islamic State. The governorate subsequently experienced armed confrontations involving government forces and the Southern Transitional Council, which gained control of the city in 2019.

== Geography ==
Aden is one of the governorates of Yemen. It is located in the Gulf of Aden, approximately 363 km (226 mi) from the national capital Sana'a. It occupies an area of approximately 750 km^{2} (290 sq mi), and has its seat at the city of Aden.

Aden governorate consists of a coastal plateau and a mountainous terrain inland. The coast is predominantly flat with the presence of sand dunes. The Tuban Delta is formed by two wadies–Wadi Al Kabeer and Wadi Al Sageer. There are 21 islands which form part of the governorate. The governorate experiences a hot and humid climate with annual average temperature of 27 °C (81 °F) and average humidity of 62 to 73%. The governorate receives rainfall mainly during the winter and spring. The water supply is mainly through reservoirs and open wells.

== Administration and sub-divisions ==
Aden is administered through a local council consisting of 16 members and the governor. The governorate is divided into eight districts:

Districts
District	Size (km²)	Population		
District	Size (km²)	Female	Male	Total
Dar Sad	37	95,756	99,115	194,871
Ash Shaikh Outhman	42	107,253	111,016	218,269
Al Mansura	88	105,504	109,206	214,710
Al Buraiqeh	486	75,094	77,730	152,824
Attawahi	10	54,450	56,366	110,816
Al Mualla	4	50,659	52,437	103,096
Craiter	13	77,098	79,801	156,899
Khur Maksar	61	47,537	49,206	96,743
Total	741	613,351	634,877	1,248,228

== Demographics ==
According to the 2004 population census, Aden Governorate had a population of 589,419. The population was estimated to be 731,000 in 2011. According to a 2025 report, the governorate had an estimated population of 1,248,228, comprising 634,877 males and 613,351 females.

== Economy ==
Aden govenorate is an important commercial and economic center of Yemen. Aden is the second most populous city of the country, and hosts the Aden Port and oil facilities. The economic activities in the governorate include commerce, agriculture, fishing, and other services. Agriculture is practised in the Tuban Delta, where crops such as wheat, millets, maize, cotton, and fruits are grown. Fishing is practised along the coast. Other industries include petrochemicals and the manufacture of construction materials from scoria, perlite, and clay.

According to the 2014 local authority budget, locally generated revenues contributed 9% and central government grants and subsidies accounted for approximately 91% of the governorate's income.
