= Sheikh Othman =

Coordinates: 12.8864°N 45.0156°E

Sheikh Othman مديرية الشيخ عثمان
- District
- Interactive map of Sheikh Othman
- Country: Yemen
- Governorate: Aden

Population (2003)
  - Total: 105,248
- Time zone: UTC+3 (Yemen Standard Time)

Sheikh Othman (Arabic: الشيخ عثمان, romanized: Ash Shaykh ‘Uthmān) is a district of the Aden Governorate, Yemen. As of 2003, the district had a population of 105,248 inhabitants.

== History ==
Sheikh Othman derives its name from a religious shrine for Sheikh Othman Al-Zubairi Al-Wahki. The shrine is located in the original village of "Sheikh Al-Daweel". In 1880 the Government of Aden Colony completed buying a vast area of land from the Sultan of Lahj. The area then was properly planned for civil settlement new streets were paved and all supporting facilities such as schools, public colleges, mosques, markets, and cinemas were built.

RAF Sheikh Othman was located within the district.
