= Flag of the Colony of Aden =

1937–1963 official flag

Flag of Aden

Flag of the Governor of Aden

The Flag of the Colony of Aden was used as the official flag for the British Colony of Aden from 1937 until 18 January, 1963. When it was renamed as the State of Aden, subsequently, the Flag of the State of Aden under the Federation of South Arabia, was used. However, there is evidence that the flag was used after 1963, in Perim and the Kuria Muria islands. It was a navy blue flag with the Union Jack in the top left corner, which featured a badge similar to colonial Zanzibar, with a two-masted Arab dhow sailing on turquoise waters. It was designed by George Kruger Gray, of the Royal Mint.

== History ==
The Colony of Aden was created in 1937 after Aden Province was split from the British Raj. The first Governor of Aden, Sir Bernard Rawdon Reilly came up with the idea for the flag badge for the new colony. Reilly suggested using a two masted dhow on the seas. He also recommended that brown hills be in the background, similar to ones that appeared on Aden's postage stamps. However, when the designs got to the Royal Mint, when the badge and flag were created, the planned inclusion of the hills were omitted. It was also noted in the design that the stern flag appeared to be flying against the wind. In addition to being used on the regular blue ensign to represent the colony, a version with a red ensign was also created around the same time to act as Aden's merchant ensign.

In 1963, following Aden's transfer to the Federation of South Arabia as the State of Aden, a new flag was created for the state within the Federation to replace the colonial flag.
