= Tom Hickinbotham =

British colonial administrator (1903–1983)

Sir Tom Hickinbotham KCMG KCVO CIE OBE

Governor of Aden
- In office 1951–1956
- Preceded by: Sir Reginald Champion
- Succeeded by: Sir William Henry Luce

Personal details
- Born: 27 April 1903 Carnarvon, Western Australia
- Died: 14 October 1983 (aged 80)
- Occupation: Colonial administrator

Sir Tom Hickinbotham (27 April 1903 – 14 October 1983) was a British colonial administrator who served as governor of Aden from 1951 to 1956.

== Early life and education ==
Hickinbotham was born on 27 April 1903 in Carnarvon, Western Australia, the son of James Ryland Hickinbotham and Beatrice Elliot Sharp. He was educated at Epsom College and Colchester Royal Grammar School before he passed through Royal Military College, Sandhurst.

== Career ==
Hickinbotham joined the Indian Army in 1923 and served on the North West Frontier for which he was decorated. In 1924, he was posted to 5th Battalion, Baluch Regiment.

In 1930, Hickinbotham transferred to the Indian Political Service and served successively in Aden from 1931 to 1932, 1933 to 1935, and 1938 and 1939; then as political agent in Bahrain in 1937; Muscat from 1939 to 1941; Kuwait from 1941 to 1943; Bahrain from 1943 to 1945; and Qalat from 1945 to 1947.

In 1948, Hickinbotham returned to Aden Colony where he served for three years as chairman of the Aden Port Trust. In 1951, he was appointed governor and commander-in-chief of Aden, a post he held until his retirement from government service in 1956. A highlight of his term in office was the visit to Aden of Queen Elizabeth in 1954.

After retiring from service, Hickinbotham became a director of various companies from 1956 to 1973. He died on 14 October 1983, aged 80.

== Honours ==
- Hickinbotham was appointed Companion of the Order of St Michael and St George (CMG) in 1951, and promoted to Knight Commander (KCMG) in the 1953 Coronation Honours.
- He was appointed Knight Commander of the Royal Victorian Order (KCVO) in 1954.
- He was appointed Companion of the Order of the Indian Empire (CIE) in the 1944 New Year Honours.
- He was appointed Officer of the Order of the British Empire (OBE) in the 1939 New Year Honours.
