= Governor Luce =

Governor Luce may refer to:

- Richard Luce, Baron Luce (born 1936), Governor of Gibraltar from 1997 to 2000
- William Luce (colonial administrator) (1907–1977), Governor of Aden from 1956 to 1960
