= Charles Theodore Abbott =

British senior colonial judge (1897-1956)

- Born: 1897; Tunbridge Wells, Kent
- Died: 13 January 1956 (aged 58); Seremban
- Occupation(s): Barrister and senior colonial judge
- Children: 1 son

Charles Theodore Abbott (1897 – 13 January 1956) was a British barrister and senior colonial judge.

== Early life and education ==
Abbott was born in 1897 at Tunbridge Wells, Kent, the only son of John Abbott FRCS. He was educated Portora Royal School, Enniskillen.

In 1914, at the age of 17, he joined the Royal Navy and served as an able seaman for the first few months of the First World War. In 1915 he was granted a commission in the Middlesex Regiment, and saw service in India, Mesopotamia and Salonika until his demobilisation in 1919.

== Career ==
Abbott enrolled as a student at Gray's Inn, was called to the Bar in 1921, and went on the South Eastern Circuit for nine years.

In 1930, he was appointed as a resident magistrate and Crown counsel in the Colony and Protectorate of Kenya. In 1932, he went to Cyprus as President of a District Court, and in 1938 was transferred to Sierra Leone as Solicitor-General. He acted as Chief Justice of Aden in 1940–41; was appointed Puisne Judge, Nigeria, 1944–1950; and acted as Chief Justice of the Federation of Malaya in 1951.

== Personal life and death ==
Abbott married Constance Smithett in 1921 and they had a son. Abbott died at Seremban, Malaya on 13 January 1956, aged 58.
