= Harold Ingrams =

British colonial administrator (1897–1973)

William Harold Ingrams, OBE CMG (3 February 1897 – 9 December 1973) was a British colonial administrator who served in Zanzibar, Mauritius, Aden (1934-1945), the British occupation zone in Germany (1945-1947), and the Gold Coast. He is best known for his posting in Mukalla, together with his wife Doreen, where he oversaw the Hadhramaut region and brokered a truce between feuding tribes known as "Ingrams' Peace".

For their pioneer work in Southern Arabia Harold and Doreen Ingrams were awarded jointly the Gold Medal of the Royal Geographical Society (1940) and the Lawrence Memorial Medal of the Royal Society for Asian Affairs (1939) - the only time either organisation offered a joint award.

== Bibliography ==
- Arabia and the Isles: Its History and Its People, with a foreword by Lt-Col Sir Bernard Reilly. John Murray, London, 1942; 3rd edition with an Introduction Covering the Recent Developments in South Western Arabia, Praeger, New York, 1966.
- Seven Across the Sahara, from Ash to Accra, John Murray, London, 1949.
- Hong Kong, HM Stationery Office, London, 1952.
- Uganda: A Crisis of Nationhood, HM Stationery Office, London, 1960.
- The Yemen: Imams, Rulers and Revolutions, John Murray, London, 1963.
- Zanzibar: Its History and Its People, Cass, London, 1967.

== See also ==
- Hadhrami Bedouin Legion
- Sayyid Abubakr bin Shaikh Al-Kaff
