= Hadhrami Bedouin Legion =

- Arabic: جيش البادية الحضرمي
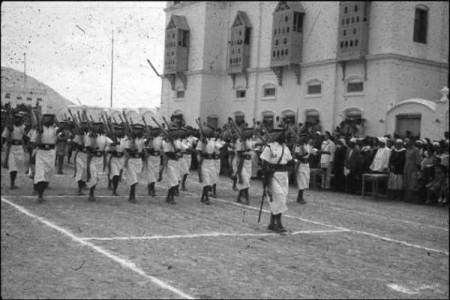
- Military parade of the HBL
- Founded: 1940
- Disbanded: 1968

The Hadhrami Bedouin Legion (Arabic: جيش البادية الحضرمي, romanized: Jaish Al-Badia Al-Hadhrami) was a joint army of the Hadhrami sultanates of South Arabia. It established on 1 January 1940 in Ghail bin Yamin in Hadramout, according to a proposal submitted by the political advisor to the Qu’aiti and Kathiri Sultanates, Harold Ingrams, to the British Colonies Ministry, which responded with an approval. A period when groups of people from all regions of the Badia joined, which included: the Qu'aiti sultanate, the Kathiri sultanate, the sultanate of al-Mahra and the sultanate of al-Wahidi.

The formation of this army followed the Jordanian pattern on which the formation of the "Jordanian Desert Forces" was based. The main task of the Hadhrami Bedouin Legion was to maintain security in the eastern protectorate, protect its borders, conduct contacts and form social ties and political relations with the Bedouin communities along the historical deserts of Hadramout, which were not until that time under the influence of any of the sultanates, and before that, its formation was for the purpose of achieving The spread of British influence throughout the historical lands of Hadramout, according to the British strategy “Forward”. The subordination of that army to the British Crown was direct, as was the regular Union Army (the Liwi Army) in the Western Aden Protectorate (the Southern Arab Union).

== The Truce of Ingrams ==
After the truce concluded by the British Chancellor (Harold Ingrams) between the Hadrami tribes, the idea of establishing and establishing the Hadhrami Bedouin Legion came into being, at the hands of Chancellor Ingrams, who is the founder and sponsor of this army and its managers until it became one of the best organized armies in the south of the Arabian Peninsula. This army was considered From the beginning it was an integral part of the forces of the King of Britain [needing a source] and at the end of 1939 AD the Hadhrami Bedouin Legion was founded. Sometimes for leaving the force camp. In 1941 AD their number reached seventy men, and in 1943 AD their number ranged between eighty and ninety men. And the number began to rise in 1944 AD to three hundred soldiers, seventy irregulars, and one hundred reservists.

On the other hand, Ingrams made sure that the leaders of the Hadhrami Bedouin Legion were not from the British, although he was impressed by Glubb Pasha's experience in Jordan, but he preferred that the leaders of the Hadhrami Bedouin Legion be from the Arab Legion in Jordan. He asked Glubb Pasha to lend him a number of Arab officers, the most prominent of whom were: Abdullah Suleiman Al-Saadoun Al-Iraqi, Barakat Trad Al-Khraisha, and Abd Al-Hadi Hammad Al-Otaibi. Tribal Courts Law - a judge and mediator between the Bedouin tribes. The Jordanians continued to lead the Bedouin Legion until just before independence, when an Hadrami officer was appointed to this army, Salem Omar Al-Juhi.

In 1943 AD, Mukalla became the main center of the Badia Army, where the old Thumi Fort in East Dis Al-Mukalla was restored and repaired, and military barracks were built next to it. A small hospital was also built in that place, which also serves the rest of the other military units. And after the construction of the Legon Fort in 1939 AD, the Bir Al-Askar Fort was built near Shabwa in 1942 AD, and in 1944 AD centers and forts were built for this army in Qarn in Raida Al-Maara, and in Haru, which is located on an important road that connects Ghail bin Yamin from the west, and it also became a fortress Al-Ar al-Qadim in the Manahil region on the way to the tomb of the Prophet of God Hood became another center of his force, and other forts followed in Al-Abr, so the country of Al-Sa’ir and Najidin in the Al-Din region, Mawla Matar in the Siban region, and Jedmah in the Al-Akbari region, and the formation of a camel force whose tasks are limited to patrols roaming Ramla Al-Sabateen west of Hadramout.

== Leadership ==
Colonel Hussein Muslim Al-Minhali, who held that commanding position (Staff of the Badia Army in Hadhramaut), was competent and capable through his superiority by obtaining an academic qualification in the management of military command. One of the foundations of the army was Lijeon. At the beginning of the first phase of establishing the army, the means of transportation was the military-trained camel to transport supplies, equipment, and equipment. One of the army’s tasks is to protect the companies operating in the desert strip by guarding its brigades, the work sites of those mobile companies according to its plans in every work site of the company ( Al-Kanb), and the guard moves daily with the survey work teams (naqsha), as well as oil exploration operations by guarding the rigs (cranes). in border protection. These centers were considered prominent landmarks and historical constants, but the centers are now in dire need of urgent maintenance and restoration operations to preserve them, because parts of them, if not all, are threatened with collapse due to lack of attention to them, except for the Thamud Center, which is the only existing building, which It was built in the early fifties, when its construction coincided with the construction of Al-Tomato bin Harbi Al-Minhali, a house for him in Thamud, and thus those forts that were built next to the historical well of Thamud are considered.

== Strength ==
Ingrams brought in officers from the Jordanian Arab Legion to train and organize the Hadhrami Bedouin Legion, and the "Legion" area near Gail bin Yamin in the center of the Hamum region was chosen to be the main center for this force. The aim, according to Ingrams' point of view, was to distance it from all centers of urban influence. The people of the region resisted the presence of that center in their region, but they were subdued by force, so they had no choice but to surrender.

The Hadhrami Bedouin Legion initially consisted of: 50 soldiers, 12 camels, two transport vehicles and a wireless device. The number of that force grew slowly, as it reached in 1941 AD to seventy men, and to about ninety men in 1943, until it reached in 1944 to three hundred men in addition to seventy men from its affiliates who were irregulars, i.e. civilian attachés, and one hundred reservists.

The development of the Hadhrami Bedouin Legion was reflected positively on the geographical area to which its control extended, and barracks, castles and fortresses were built for it in every area it controlled, and it was provided with the necessary services, the most important of which are military medical services. It received special patronage, and achieved a wide spread in the eastern protectorate of Aden, and became the most important military force in it.

== Army's role ==
The Badia Army was not used as a tool of repression and did not participate in any war. Rather, its role was mainly limited to settling disputes by tribal custom between the tribes with each other, and between the tribes and the government. Did not exceed the number of killed members of this army ten or eleven people. His victims are also a few dead. Sometimes he was forced to use force to protect his followers or to help and save some members of the regular army.

The first incident in which the Badia Army used force was against members of the “House of Ali” of the Hamoum tribe. A small group from Beit Ali attacked a regular army fort in Ghail Bin Yamin, and when the army command heard the shooting, it prepared the force and rushed to the aid of the regular army soldiers. Bedouin in this incident. The second incident occurred in November 1942, when two people from Ali's house killed two soldiers from the Badia Army with the aim of stealing their rifles. A squad from the Badia Army managed to chase and kill them, and the two guns were recovered.

And the third incident, when a group from Ali’s house ambushed three cars loaded with building materials for Fort Lijoun, in the Harro Plain, killing five young guards of the convoy and wounding others, so help from the Bedouin Legion moved from Ghail bin Yamin led by Hassan Bahaj, and they came from behind and killed 25 people from the house Ali, and the rest of them withdrew alive. The Badia Army was constantly patrolling the Badia and border areas.

There are quarterly inspection patrols that come out of the main center in Mukalla and pass through all the Badia Army centers. Doreen Ingrams accompanied one of those patrols in 1943, during which she covered five hundred miles on camel, and her and the patrol's only food was dates and dried fish. The purpose of these patrols was to visit army centers in those remote Bedouin areas, to notify the Bedouins of regular visits from the government, to strengthen ties between the Bedouins and the government, and to collect information (intelligence) about what was going on in the desert.

== The legion and education ==
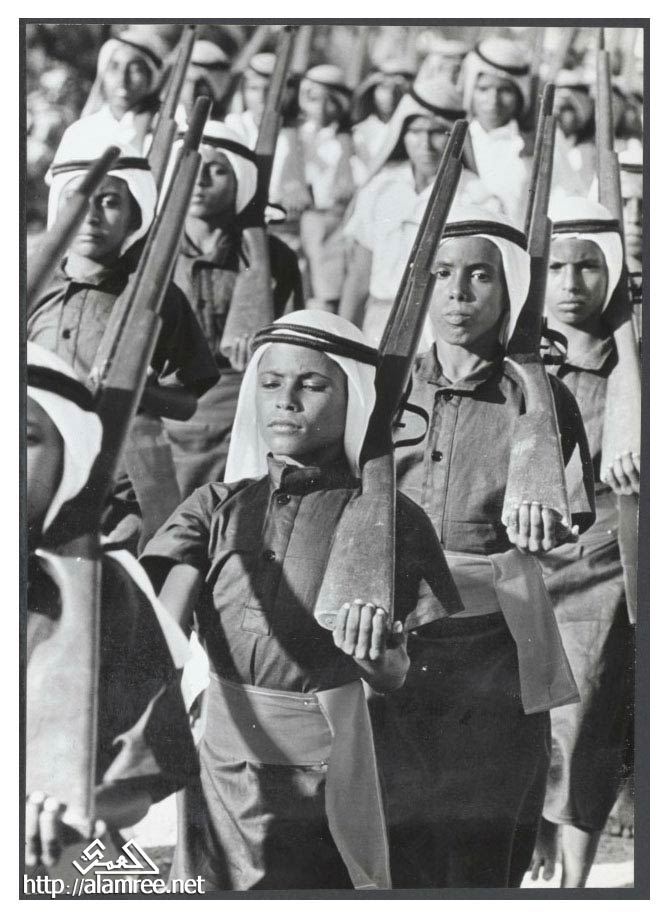
A military parade for members of the Hadhrami Bedouin Legion Youth School

The “Badia Army” law gave importance to the issue of education and literacy among the members of the Badia Army, and when the nucleus of the Badia Army was established, a special teacher was appointed for it, whose task is to erase the illiteracy of individuals, although the priority of admission to the army is for the illiterate, but the literacy of those accepted is a task that takes place within the army . That is why Articles 45-51 of the Badia Army Law stressed the need for the army commander to make sure that all members of the force received a degree of education and became able to read and write in the shortest possible time, and the necessity of continuing education, and the necessity of providing the requirements for that. Therefore, a plan was drawn up to pay attention to the education of the children of the Bedouins, through a central school in Mukalla that accommodates one hundred students, the School of the Bedouins.

The Badia Girls School had opened a few months after the Badia Boys School, and it started with twenty-four students. The stages of the primary school classes were completed, the acceptance rate increased, and the classrooms and boarding buildings were crowded with Bedouin children who set out eager to seek knowledge from its sources, tempted by the love of knowledge and ambition to register as soldiers and non-commissioned officers in the Bedouin army. For government jobs in the chancellery.

The stated goals when the Badia Army was established were to limit the Badia Army's activity mainly to the Bedouin areas only, but the conditions that prevailed in some urban areas made Ingrams extend the army's activity to the areas that fall under the direct supervision of the governments of the two sultanates. In 1941 AD, Ingrams conducted patrols for the Badia Army in the Hadramout Valley, to protect the roads around Seiyun. The Katheer family, and with them the Al-Kaf family, looked at this upbringing with suspicion and suspicion, and their presence in the rooms in 1943 caused concern for the many, so they asked the British authorities in Aden to withdraw them.

== British withdrawal ==
In 1967, the British summoned their advisors and civil servants from Mukalla, Seiyun, and Al-Mahra, and their offices and female advisors were closed by gathering them at Al-Rayyan airport, from which they traveled to Aden. The British leaders of the Hadrami army with their complete and final withdrawal from Hadramout in “August 1967 AD” and the cancellation of all treaties and consultations signed between Britain and the sultans. A month before the rebels of the National Front took control of Mukalla », the following authorization came:

1. The military commander, Salem Omar Al-Jouhi, Commander of the Badia Army, and Commander Hussein Muslim Al-Menhali, the Deputy Staff of the Army, are authorized to manage the affairs of the country with their patriotism and their full knowledge of their country.
2. A financial authorization to operate the current account in the Eastern Bank, especially the budget of the Hadhrami Bedouin Legion, and authorization for both: Salem Al-Juhi, Army Commander, Hussein Al-Minhali, Staff Command, Saleh Bin Brik, Army Accountant
3. The commanders mentioned in this authorization were delegated to travel to Aden to bring sums of money to meet the obligations of the Badia Army.

Britain instructed the sultans to travel to discuss the determination of their fate with the Arab bodies and governments and the world at the same time determined that the Hadrami Bedouin Legion take over the country with the authorization of British representatives.

== See also ==
- Yemeni Armed Forces
