= Lawrence of Arabia Medal =

The Lawrence of Arabia Medal (also known as the Lawrence Memorial Medal) was an award conferred by the Royal Society for Asian Affairs (RSAA).

== History ==
The Lawrence of Arabia Medal was established in 1935 in honour of T. E. Lawrence to recognise "work of outstanding merit in the fields of exploration, research or literature" by British subjects. The design of the medal was by Eric Kennington.

In 2025, the RSAA decided that, as the medal had been created to honour activities that were mainly connected with Britain's imperial past, and because it had consequently been awarded only infrequently in recent decades, it should be discontinued.

== Recipients ==
The medal was awarded 32 times between 1936 and 2016:

- 1936 John Bagot Glubb
- 1937 Charles Bell
- 1938 Claude Scudamore Jarvis
- 1939 Harold Ingrams and Doreen Ingrams
- 1940 Frederick Peake
- 1941 C. E. Corry
- 1942 Mildred Cable
- 1943 Orde Wingate
- 1944 Ursula Graham Bower
- 1947 Charles Pawsey
- 1948 Henry Holland
- 1949 Freddie Spencer Chapman
- 1953 John Hunt, Baron Hunt
- 1954 Wilfred Thesiger
- 1960 Violet Dickson
- 1961 Stephen Hemsley Longrigg
- 1964 Nevill Barbour
- 1965 Hugh Boustead
- 1966 Charles Belgrave
- 1969 Max Mallowan
- 1971 Seton Lloyd
- 1973 Olaf Caroe
- 1974 Robert Bertram Serjeant
- 1980 Elizabeth Monroe
- 1985 Chris Bonington
- 1986 Sandy Gall
- 1995 George Basil Popov
- 1998 Hugh Leach
- 2001 Colin Thubron
- 2004 John Hare
- 2011 David Hempleman-Adams
- 2016 Michael Asher
