= Bradshaw Reilly =

British army officer

Lieutenant colonel Bradshaw Yorke Reilly (March 1807 - 5 November 1853) was a military officer in the service of the East India Company in the 19th century.

== Biography ==
He was born in Bath, Somerset in 1807. He entered the East India Company Military Seminary in 1821 and was commissioned into the Bengal Engineers as an ensign in 1823. On passing out, he was selected with a fellow cadet Frederick Bordwine for the engineers, however unable to distinguish between the two who were equals on merit, it was resolved that they draw lots resulting in Reilly going to Bengal and Bordwine to Bombay. He was promoted to Lieutenant in May 1824 and participated in the Siege of Bharatpur. He married Emily Robson on 13 July 1836. He saw action again as a Captain during the Gwalior campaign in 1843. Reilly was appointed a Commandant of the Corps in April 1843 and was advanced to Major in late 1844. In the First Anglo-Sikh War he commanded the 2, 3, 4, 5, 6 and 7 Companies at the Battle of Sobraon. He was transferred to the Invalid Establishment as a Lieutenant-Colonel in November 1848 and died at Landour, British India in 1853. He is the grandfather of Bernard Rawden Reilly, first Governor of Aden.
