= Al-Hallaniyah =

Large island in Oman

Native name: الحلانية
- Location within Oman Al-Hallaniyah (Middle East)

Geography
- Location: Arabian Sea
- Coordinates: 17°30′52″N 56°01′29″E
- Archipelago: Khuriya Muriya Islands
- Area: 56 km^{2} (22 sq mi)

Administration
- Oman
- Governorate: Dhofar
- Province: Shalim and the Hallaniyat Islands

Demographics
- Population: 100-150

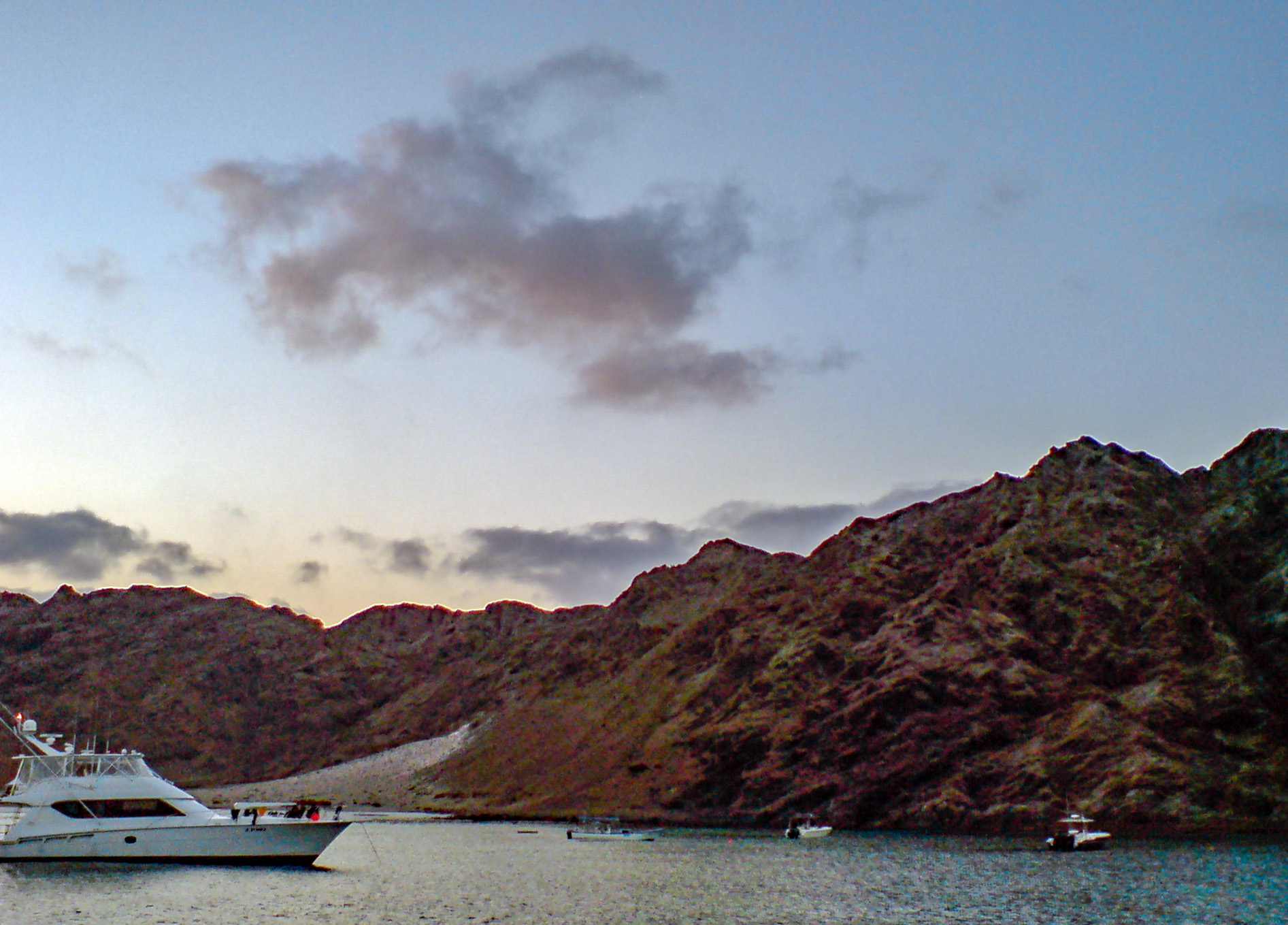
Al Hallaniyah

Al Hallaniyah (Arabic: الحلانية) is the largest and most populated of the Khuriya Muriya Islands, which belong to Oman. It is located in the center of the group, eight kilometers east of Al-Sawda, the closest island, and the second largest of the group. The area is 56 square kilometres (22 sq mi). The only village is located on the flat western part, with a population in the range of 100 to 150. It is reachable by boat or plane. An airstrip is located nearby.

The island is generally rugged and barren, except for some tamarix trees and a little grass on its eastern side. The central part of the island rises to granite chimney peaks standing close together. The tallest peak reaches a height of 495 metres (1,624 ft).

The east and west ends of the island terminate in comparatively low points. Ras al Hallaniyah, the summit and northern headland of the island, is a bold projecting bluff, 501 metres (1,644 ft) high. The coast of a length of one mile on either side of this bluff consists of a Muschelkalk cliff descending almost vertically to the sea.

The inhabitants visit the other islands with their boats, weather permitting, to catch birds and collect eggs. Other than that, their main occupation is fishing. The inhabitants speak a dialect of the Shehri (or Jibbali) language. During the Charif, from mid-May to mid-September, cold water rich of nutrients from great depths reaches the surface, bringing with it an abundance of fish. The sea is rough during that time, and the weather is windy and foggy.

In early 2016, the International Journal of Nautical Archaeology released an interim report documenting the discovery and subsequent excavation of a shipwreck believed to be the Portuguese vessel Esmerelda. Esmeralda foundered in 1503 while being captained by Vicente Sodré, maternal uncle of Vasco da Gama, and was discovered in 1998. Although little remained of the vessel itself due to the shallow waters in which it sank, an excavation from 2013 to 2015 discovered 2,800 artifacts including an extremely rare índio silver coin minted for trade with India, a dozen gold coins, a copper alloy ship's bell, stone cannonballs, and part of what is believed to be an astrolabe. In March 2019, the astrolabe has been recorded as the oldest of its kind, according to the Guinness World Record.
