= List of British colonial administrators of Aden =

Flag of the Governor of Aden and High Commissioner of South Arabia

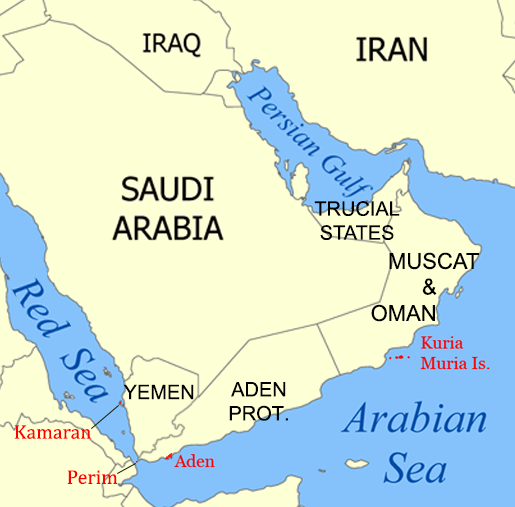
Map of the Colony of Aden, including insular dependencies (the islands of Kamaran, Perim and Khuriya Muriya).

This is a list of British colonial administrators of Aden from the 1839 Aden Expedition to the 1967 withdrawal from Aden. They were appointed from British India until 1937 when the Chief Commissioner's Province of Aden became the Colony of Aden under the responsibility of the Colonial Office in London.

Aden merged into independent South Yemen on 30 November 1967. For British representation since then, see: List of ambassadors of the United Kingdom to Yemen.

== List ==
British colonial administrators of Aden
Portrait	Name	Term of office	
Political Agents
	Captain Stafford Bettesworth Haines, Indian Navy	1839	1854
	Major-General James Outram	1854	1856
Political Residents
	Colonel William Marcus Coghlan	1854	1862
	Major-General R. W. Honner	1862	1862
	Colonel William Marcus Coghlan	1862	1863
	Major William Merewether	1863	1867
	Major-General Sir Edward Russell	1867	1870
	Major-General Charles William Tremenheere	1870	1872
	Brigadier John Schneider	1872	1877
	Brigadier Francis Adam Ellis Loch	1877	1882
	Brigadier James Blair	1882	1885
	Brigadier Adam George Forbes Hogg	1890	1890
	Brigadier John Jopp	1890	1895
	Brigadier Charles Alexander Cunningham	1895	1899
	Brigadier Garratt O'Moore Creagh	1899	1901
	Brigadier Pelham James Maitland	1901	1904
	Major-General Harry Macan Mason	1904	1906
	Major-General Ernest de Brath	1906	1910
	Brigadier James Alexander Bell	1910	1914
	Brigadier Charles Henry Uvedale Price	1915	1915
	Major-General James Marshall Stewart	1916	1920
	Major-General Thomas Edwin Scott	1920	1925
	Major-General John Henry Keith Stewart	1925	1928
	Lieutenant Colonel George Stewart Symes	1928	1930
	Lieutenant Colonel Bernard Rawdon Reilly	1930	1932
Chief Commissioner
	Lieutenant Colonel Bernard Rawdon Reilly	1932	1937
Governors
	Sir Bernard Reilly	1937	1940
	Sir John Hathorn Hall	1940	1944
	Sir Reginald Champion	1944	1951
	Sir Tom Hickinbotham	1951	1956
	Sir William Henry Luce	1956	1960
	Sir Charles Johnston	1960	1963
High Commissioners
	Sir Kennedy Trevaskis	1963	1965
	Sir Richard Turnbull	1965	1967
	Sir Humphrey Trevelyan	1967	1967

== See also ==
- Aden Province
- Colony of Aden
- Federation of South Arabia
- State of Aden
