= Sayyid Abubakr bin Shaikh Al-Kaff =

Yemeni philanthropist (c. 1890–1965)

Sir, Sayyid Abubakr bin Shaikh Al-Kaff KBE
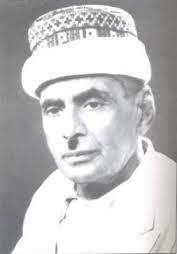
- Born: c. 1890; Singapore, Straits Settlements
- Died: 1965 (aged 74–75); Seiyun, Protectorate of South Arabia
- Known for: Pacifism and philanthropy

Abubakr bin Shaikh Al-Kaff KBE (Arabic: أبو بكر بن شيخ الكاف; c. 1890–1965) was a Yemeni philanthropist known for assisting Harold Ingrams in pacifying Hadhramaut. He was also Councillor of the Kathiri State of Seiyun in the Aden Protectorate.

== Early life ==
Al-Kaff was born in Singapore around 1890 but would later move to Hadhramaut. He was part of a sayyid family from Tarim who had become wealthy from real estate and trading in the Dutch East Indies and Singapore.

== Life ==
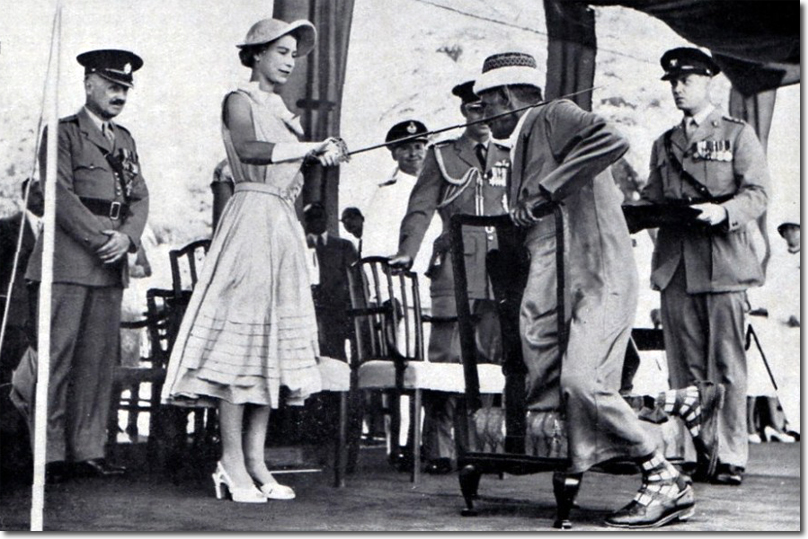
Elizabeth II knighting Al-Kaff as part of her 1954 visit to Aden Colony.

Al-Kaff helped to finance the construction of a road in Hadhramaut from the interior to the coast which included compensating local tribesmen for the loss of earnings from their camel trains due to the rise of motor vehicles. Ingrams wrote that he had started building the road about ten years prior to his arrival and that the cost of compensations was $180,000. He also commented that the little knowledge Al-Kaf's foreman Ubeid had was dangerous as he never knew when a task was impossible and thought motor-cars could go up anything like flies. Al-Kaff was also involved in providing free education and medical care to the people of Tarim by maintaining a school and hospital.

In 1936, Al-Kaff assisted British colonial administrator Harold Ingrams in brokering a three year truce between warring Qu'aiti and Kathiri tribes. Ingrams mentions him in his 1942 book Arabia and the Isles in which he describes Al-Kaf as being "in a class by himself, but, although his holy descent no doubt increased his influence, his claim to fame rests rather on his own personality and character". He added that they "were total allies and he played no part with the general body of Seiyids who had a traditional vested interest in the continuation of feuds". Ingrams noted that he could be an embarrassment due to his desire for Hadhramaut to be ruled by the British like Singapore but that Al-Kaf accepted that he "would not play that way".

In 1938, he was appointed Commander of the Most Excellent Order of the British Empire for his public services and in 1953 he was promoted to Knight Commander. In April 1954, Queen Elizabeth II formally knighted him in Aden's first and only knighthood ceremony as part of her visit to the colony. He was knighted whilst kneeling on a chair instead of bowing due to his Muslim faith.

== Death ==
Al-Kaff died in Seiyun in 1965.

== Sources ==
- Ingrams, Harold (1942). Arabia and the Isles. Routledge. ISBN 9781136170447.
- The Illustrated London News (1954). The Illustrated London News, Volume 224.
