= Chief Commissioner's Province =

Type of administrative division in British India

Chief Commissioner's Province refers to a type of province in British India and in the post-colonial successor states. In British India, they were under the direct control of the governor-general, and in most cases lacked representative government institutions. In 1956, as part of independent India, they were later renamed "union territories".

== India ==
In the Dominion of India (Union of India) and Republic of India:

- Chief Commissioner's Province of Ajmer-Merwara (the British Political Agent in Rajputana served as ex officio Chief Commissioner)
- Chief Commissioner's Province of Delhi
- Chief Commissioner's Province of Andaman and Nicobar Islands
- Chief Commissioner's Province of Assam
- Central Provinces and Berar
- Chief Commissioner's Province of Coorg (the British Resident in Mysore served as ex officio Chief Commissioner)
- Chief Commissioner's Province of Himachal Pradesh

== Pakistan ==
In the Dominion of Pakistan:

- North-West Frontier Province
- Chief Commissioner's Province of Balochistan (the British Political Agent in Baluchistan served as ex officio Chief Commissioner)
