= Aden Province =

Dependency of British India

Coordinates: 12°48′N 45°02′E

Aden Settlement (1839–1932) Chief Commissioner's Province of Aden (1932–1937)
- Dependency of British India
- 1839–1937
- Flag

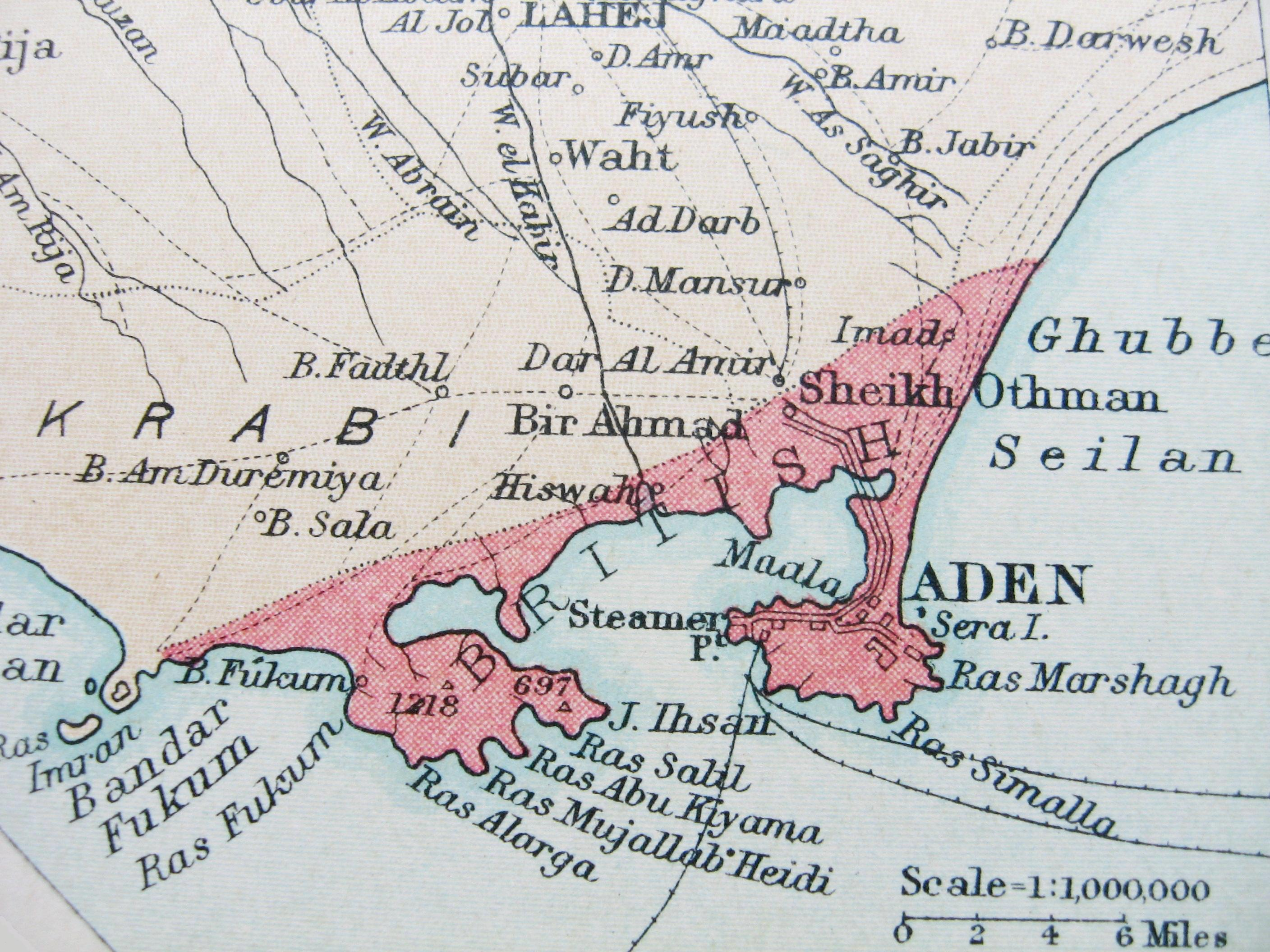
- Aden in 1922
- Capital: Aden
- Demonym: Adenese
- Area
  - 1932: 192 km^{2} (74 sq mi)
- History
  - Occupied by the British: 19 January 1839
  - Established as the Colony of Aden: 1937
Preceded by	Succeeded by
Sultanate of Lahej	Colony of Aden

The Chief Commissioner's Province of Aden was the administrative status under which the former Aden Settlement (1839–1932) was placed from 1932 to 1937. Under that new status, the Viceroy of India assumed control over Aden, which had hitherto been administered by the government of the Bombay Presidency. The Aden Protectorate remained unaffected by this change.

== Background ==
For nearly a century following the 1839 capture of the port of Aden by forces of the East India Company ('EIC'), the town and its immediately surrounding area were under British rule and known as the Aden Settlement. This area became a dependency (a semi-exclave) of the distant Bombay Presidency, a polity and administrative unit of the British Raj first established in 1668 by the EIC. The settlement's indeterminate position at the southwestern end of the distant Arabian peninsula, as well as its varying population and strategic criticality, meant that there were bound to be difficulties in these governance arrangements. Historian RJ Gavin pointed out in 1975 that "Aden’s whole history since 1839 had been marked by administrative confusion and complication." Before taking action, the chief British official at Aden—known as the Resident—was often required to obtain approval from three different authorities: the Bombay Government, the Government of British India (headed by the Viceroy), and the Colonial Office in London.

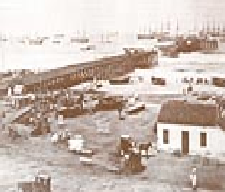
A photograph of the harbour of Aden, photographed in 1864.

Matters came to a head during World War I. In 1917, the Government of British India, recognising its inability to provide sufficient forces to defend Aden against invading Turkish forces, transferred military control of the settlement to the War Office and control of Aden Protectorate affairs to the Foreign Office. The transfer was incomplete since India retained control of affairs within the Settlement itself, something which was increasingly seen in London as an anachronism given that Aden was so obviously positioned in the Middle East and its population was substantially from the Arab world.

Things dragged on however and for the next two decades the administration of Aden witnessed incessant bureaucratic wrangling among the Bombay Presidency, the Government of India, the India Office, the Colonial Office, and the War Office. This "broke through from time to time in the columns of newspapers and on to the floor of the House of Commons and the representative assemblies in India." The chief disagreement was over the division of costs between India and London, in particular regarding the sizeable defence costs of Aden. Another important roadblock (to the full transfer of Aden to London) was the unpopularity of the Colonial Office amongst the well-established and powerful Indian commercial community in Aden; it was aware of administrative discrimination against Indians in British East Africa and there was a fear the same would happen in Aden if it was placed directly under the control of the Colonial Office.

== Creation of the Chief Commissioner's Province ==
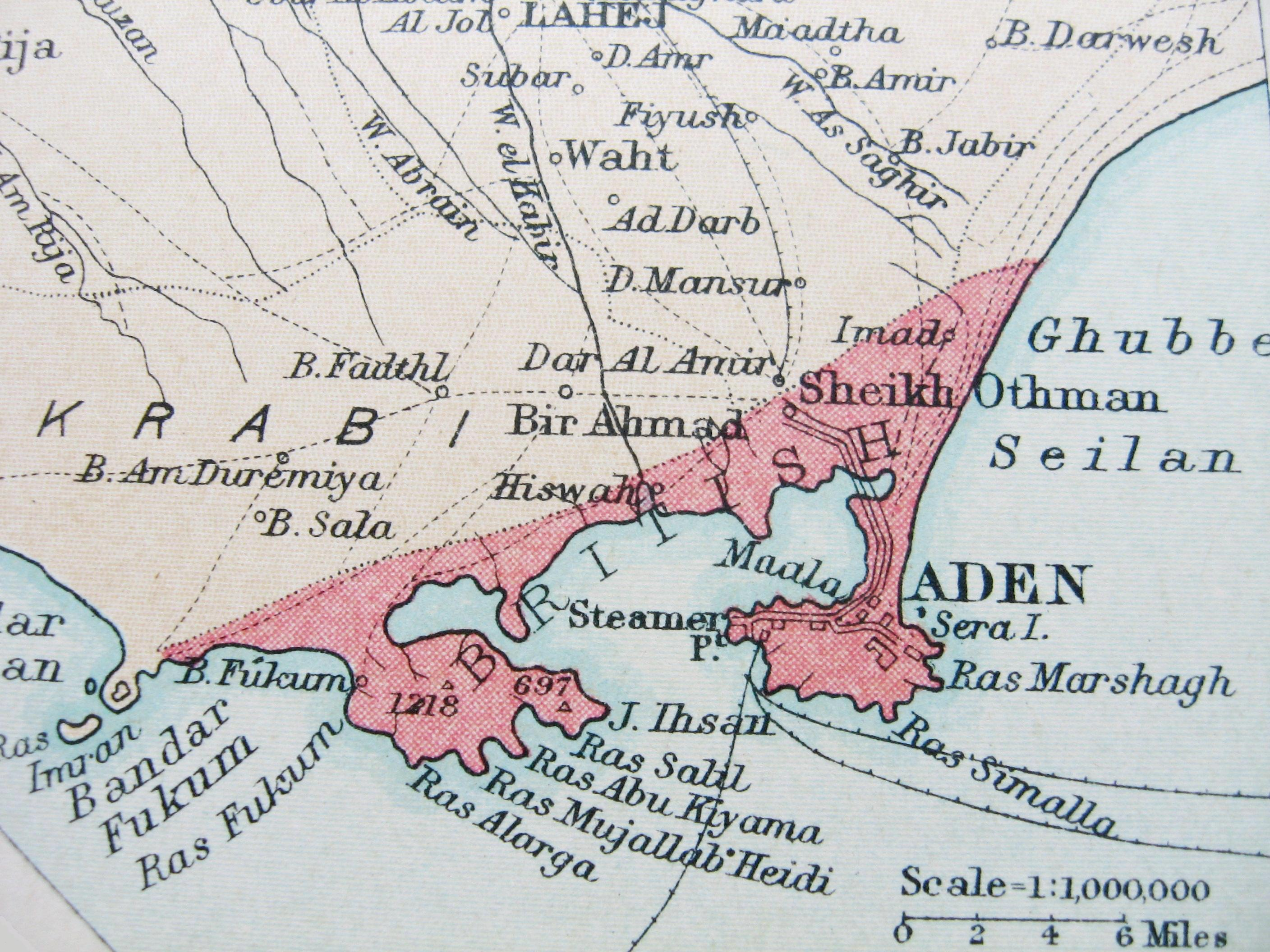
The territory of British Aden on a 1922 map.

The issue gained urgency at the end of the 1920s when discussions on constitutional reforms in India began. Far-away Aden, with its Arab majority, could not easily be accommodated in a new federal India, especially if a considerably empowered Bombay legislative assembly would remain in charge. Therefore, it was decided that, until the final status of Aden was decided, Bombay would give up its administrative control over the territory and it would become a "Chief Commissioner's Province" under the control of the Viceroy.

This status, which took effect on 1 April 1932, was expected to be short-lived: one provision of the Government of India Act 1935, stated that "Aden shall cease to be a part of British India". And so it was: in accordance with the Aden Colony Order 1936, Aden became a Crown Colony under the direct responsibility of the Colonial Office, effective from 1 April 1937. At the time, the British government had made it clear that it was unwilling to share control of such a vital imperial base or anything pertaining to it with a future, nascent, and independent nation of India. However, to mollify the Indian community (which still opposed the transfer), links with India were not totally severed. While the District and Sessions Court of Aden became the Supreme Court of the new Colony, appeals therefrom lay to the High Court of Judicature in Bombay in civil cases involving property, some other civil rights cases, and criminal cases. Also, the Indian rupee maintained its official currency status.

Sir Bernard Rawdon Reilly, who had been named Resident in 1931, then Chief Commissioner in 1932, became the first Governor of Aden Colony in 1937.

=== Religious Composition of Aden in 1891 ===
Religion	Population	Percentage
Islam	35,193	79,8%
Christian	3,005	6,8%
Judaism	2,826	6,4%
Hinduism	2,713	6,1%
Zoroastrianism	318	0,7%
Buddhism	24	0,05%

=== Composition of the population of Aden in 1933 ===
Ethnicity	Population
Arabs	29,820
Indians	7,287
Jews	4,120
Somalis	3,935
Europeans	1,145
Miscellaneous	331

=== Chief Commissioners ===
For previous British ruling officers see List of British representatives at Aden.

Sir Bernard Rawdon Reilly, a British Colonial Office diplomat, who had served as Resident in Aden from 1931, served as Chief Commissioner of the Province of Aden from its creation in 1932 until 1937. In 1937 he received his appointment as Governor of the new Colony of Aden; he served in that new role for three years, returning to London in 1940.

== Gallery ==
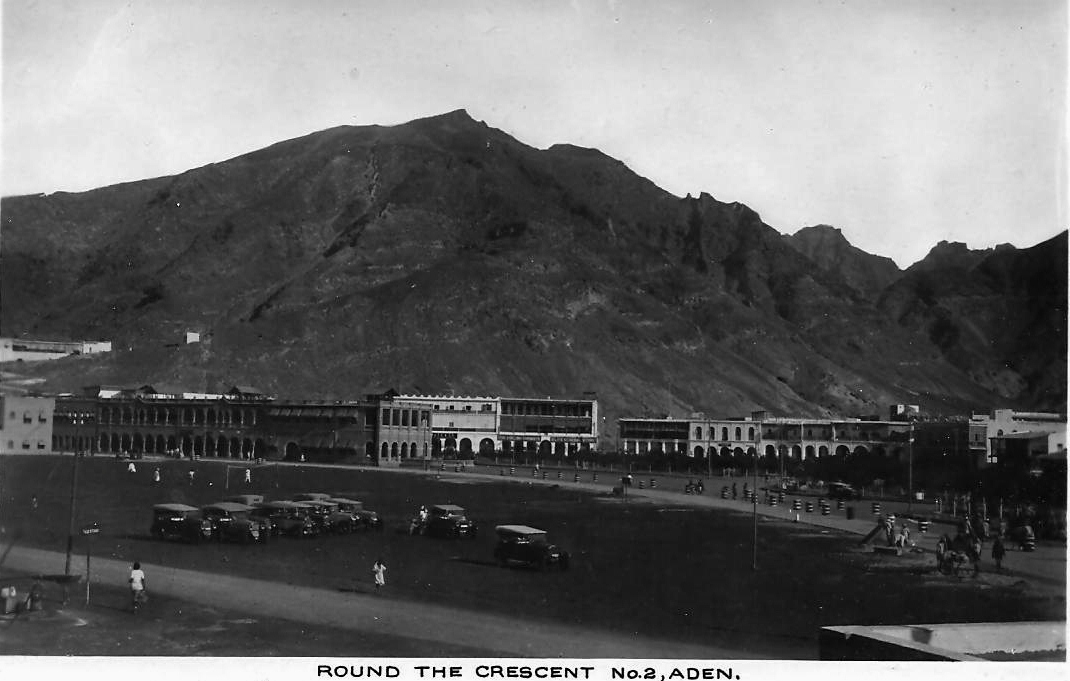
The Aden crescent in 1931

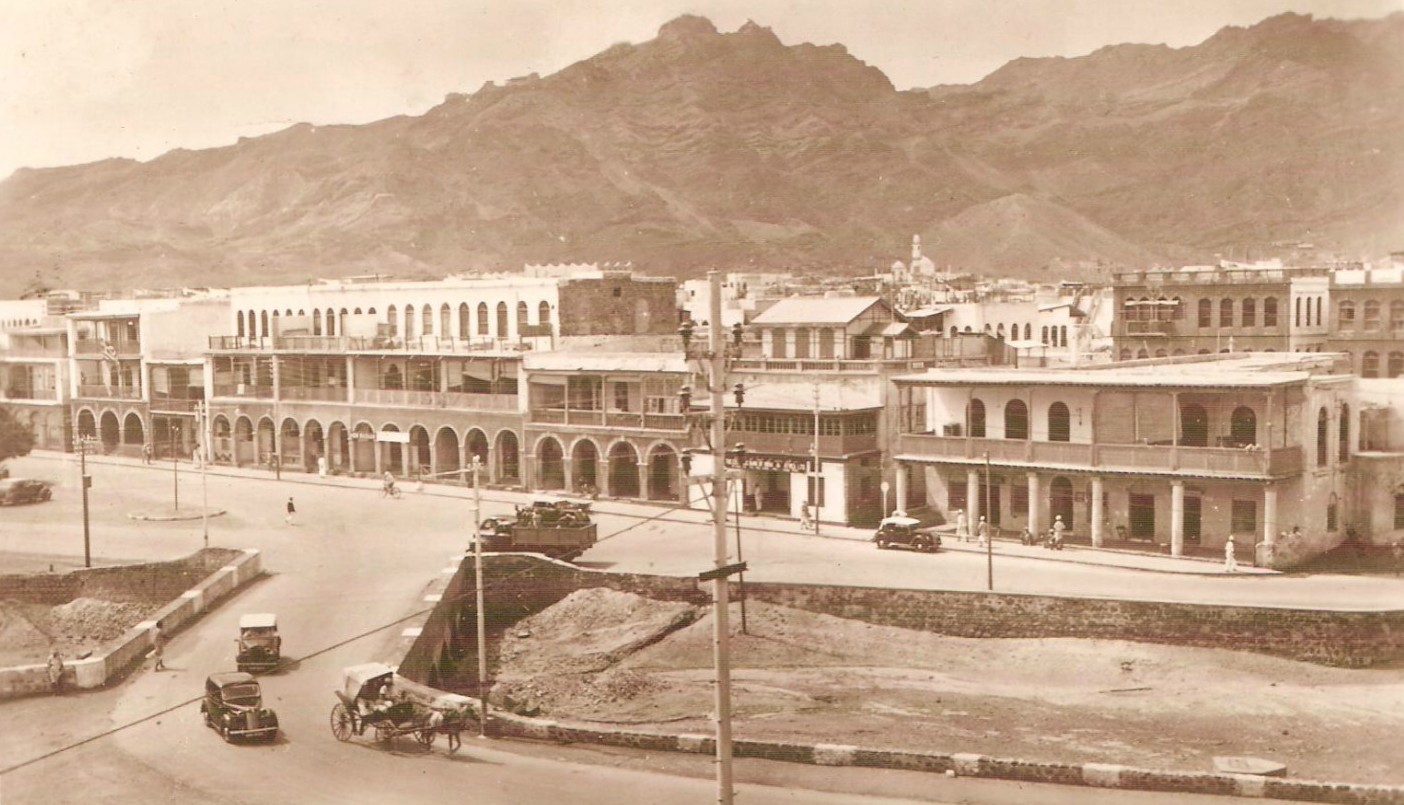
Esplanade Road in the late 1930s.

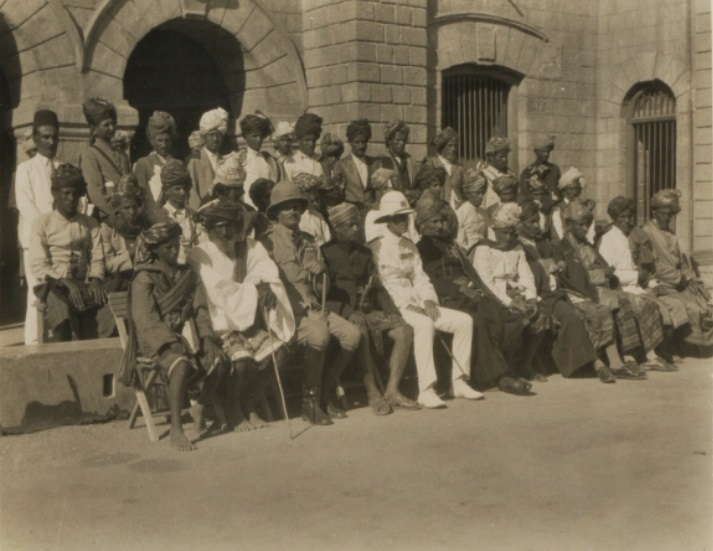
Sir Bernard Rawdon Reilly (front row 3d from left), the chief British official of Aden, at a meeting in Lahej; c. 1928–1930

== See also ==
- Postage stamps and postal history of Aden
- Aden Protectorate
- Trucial Oman
- Territorial evolution of the British Empire
- Baloch Regiment
- Robert Moresby (Survey of the Red Sea)
