= Khuriya Muriya Islands =

Islands of Oman

Khuriya Muriya
Native name: جزر الحلانيات
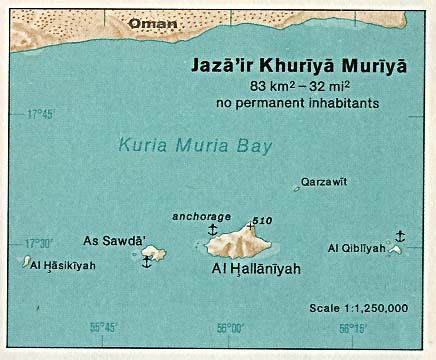

- Location within Oman Khuriya Muriya Islands (Middle East)

Geography
- Location: Arabian Sea
- Coordinates: 17°30′52″N 56°01′29″E
- Total islands: 5
- Area: 73 km^{2} (28 sq mi)

Administration
- Oman
- Governorate: Dhofar
- Province: Shalim and the Hallaniyat Islands

The Khuriya Muriya Islands or Al-Hallaniyat Islands (also Kuria Muria, Kooria Mooria, Curia Muria, Al-Hallaniyat) (Arabic: جزر الحلانيات, romanized: Juzur al-Ḥallāniyāt) are a group of five islands in the Arabian Sea, 40 km (25 mi) off the southeastern coast of Oman. The islands form part of the province of Shalim and the Hallaniyat Islands in the governorate of Dhofar.

== History ==
In antiquity the islands were called the Zenobii or Zenobiou Islands (Greek: Ζηνοβίου νησία; Latin: Zenobii Insulae) or Doliche (Greek: Δολίχη). The islands were mentioned by several early writers including Ptolemy (vi. 7. § 47) who numbered them as seven small islands lying in Khuriya Muriya Bay (Greek: Σαχαλίτης κόλπος; Latin: Sinus Sachalites), towards the entrance of the "Persian Gulf" (most likely the modern Gulf of Aden). The Periplus of the Erythraean Sea, a periplus dated to between AD 40 and 70, thus mentioned the Khuriya Muriya Islands, then called Isles of Zenobios:

After sailing along it over open water for about 2000 stades from the Isles of Zenobios, you come to the Isle of Sarapis, as it is called, about 120 stades offshore.

— Periplus of the Erythraean Sea, §33

=== Modern history ===
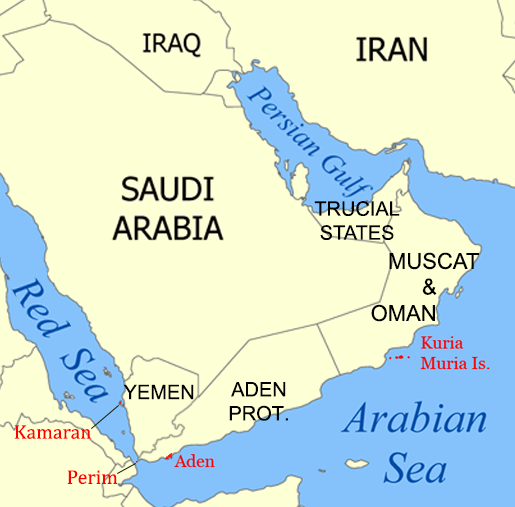
Aden Colony and dependencies, including the Kuria Muria Islands, in red

In 1854 the sultan of Muscat (later Muscat and Oman, now Oman) presented the islands to Queen Victoria as a gift and responsibility for the islands was granted to the Bombay government in British India. There was some concern at the time that the deed of cession was null since the sultan had no rights over the archipelago. The Red Sea and India Telegraph Company, formed in 1858, intended to use one of the islands as a base for a telegraph connection between Aden and Karachi but the project was abandoned in 1861 after sections of the cable failed. A group of Liverpool entrepreneurs were granted monopoly rights to harvest the abundant guano deposits, but after having met resistance from the local inhabitants who considered that resource theirs, and questions in the British parliament about the advisability of granting monopoly rights to anyone, the mining was abandoned after some 200,000 tons had been extracted between 1855 and 1860. During that period, the archipelago presented a busy scene, with up to 52 ships present on one occasion. As per a British intelligence report from 1883, fewer than 40 inhabitants lived on Al-Hallaniyah, the main island. The islanders lived in huts of unmortared stone with mat roofs, and at certain seasons they moved to caves. They lived on fish, shellfish and goat's milk, occasionally exchanging dried fish for dates and rice from passing ships. They fished entirely with hooks since they had neither boat nor nets.

==== Yemeni control ====
In 1886, the islands were attached administratively to Aden. Due to their remoteness, the lack of anchorages and the fact that the inhabitants continued to consider themselves subjects of the Sultan of Muscat, the islands remained un-administered and, for decades, were only sporadically visited by British officials. While technically part of Aden Colony, the islands, because of their remoteness and inaccessibly, were left to the supervision of the British Resident in the Persian Gulf. As a British possession until 1967, they were administered by the Governor of Aden until 1953, then by the British High Commissioner until 1963, and finally by the British Chief Political Resident of the Persian Gulf (based in Bahrain). On 30 November 1967, Lord Caradon, the British Ambassador to the United Nations, announced that in accordance with the wishes of the local inhabitants, the islands would be returned to Muscat and Oman, despite criticism from President Qahtan Muhammad al-Shaabi that the islands should be transferred to the People's Republic of South Yemen. The boundary between the two countries was not formally settled until 1992 when it was agreed that the islands were on Oman's side of the line.

==== Renaming ====
After the islands returned to Oman, the authorities in Muscat renamed the group the Hallaniyat Islands, after its largest island, Al-Hallaniyah. That island was already recorded as Hallania in 1911. The travel writer Tim Mackintosh-Smith thought the change rested on a misunderstanding, the belief that "Kuria Muria" was a European invention connected with the Virgin Mary.

In December 1967, Ali Nasir Muhammad was appointed governor of the islands of South Yemen. He gave a different explanation for the renaming, writing that the name "Kuria Muria" translates to “bird droppings.”

By February 1991 the islands formed a wilayat (province) of Dhofar under the name Hallaniyat Islands. In October 1991 the wilayat was renamed Shalim and the Hallaniyat Islands.

== Important Bird Area ==
The island group has been designated an Important Bird Area (IBA) by BirdLife International because it supports seabird breeding colonies of red-billed tropicbirds, tropical shearwaters, masked boobies, Socotra cormorants, sooty gulls, and bridled and greater crested terns. Other significant birds are resident mourning wheatears and visiting Jouanin's petrels.

== Islands ==
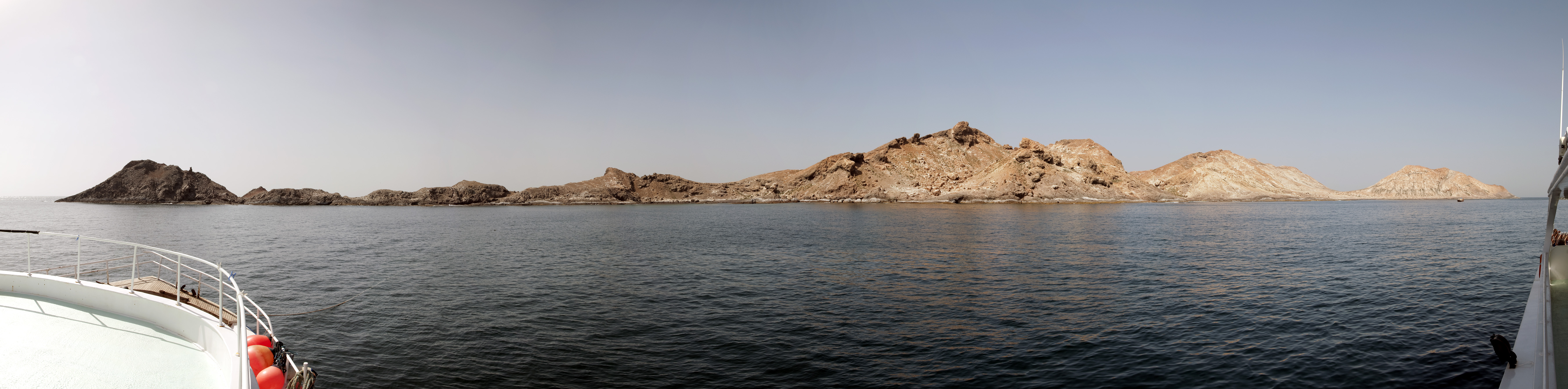
Al-Qibliyah in 2012

Island	Arabic	Transliteration	Area (km^{2})	Coordinates
Al-Hasikiyah	جزيرة الحاسكية	Ǧazīrat al-Ḥāsikiyya	2	17°28′28″N 55°36′05″E
Al-Sawda	الجزيرة السوداء	al-Ǧazīra al-Sawdāʾ	11	17°29′28″N 55°51′18″E
Al-Hallaniyah	جزيرة الحلانية	Ǧazīrat al-Ḥallāniyya	56	17°30′52″N 56°01′29″E
Qarzawit	جزيرة جرزعوت	Ǧazīrat Ǧarzaʿūt	0.3	17°37′01″N 56°08′24″E
Al-Qibliyah	الجزيرة القبلية	Ǧazīra al-Qibliyya	3	17°30′00″N 56°20′15″E
Khuriya Muriya Islands	جزر خوريا موريا	Ǧuzur Ḥūriyā Mūriyā	73	17°30′N 56°00′E

== See also ==
- Al-Hallaniyah
- Masirah Island
- Socotra
- Oman–Yemen relations

== Sources ==
- Schoff, Wilfred Harvey, ed. (1912), The Periplus of the Erythraean Sea: Travel and Trade in the Indian Ocean by a Merchant of the First Century, New York: Longmans, Green, & Co. ISBN 978-81-215-0699-1.
