= Reginald Champion =

British colonial administrator

Sir Reginald Stuart Champion, KCMG, OBE (21 March 1895 – 9 October 1982) was a British colonial administrator and Church of England clergyman. He was Governor of Aden from 1944 to 1951.

== Early life ==
The son of Philip Champion and Florence Mary Hulburd, Champion was educated at Sutton Valence School. In 1912 he enlisted in the West Kent Yeomanry, and in 1913 was commissioned in the East Surrey Regiment.

== Palestine ==
During the First World War, he served in the Middle East; in 1917 he was assigned to the Occupied Enemy Territory Administration in Palestine. He transferred to the Colonial Administrative Service in 1920, and served as District Officer in Palestine until 1928. He was wounded in Palestine.

== Aden ==
Champion was Political Secretary in Aden from 1928 to 1934, Financial Adviser to the Emirate of Trans-Jordan from 1934 to 1939, and District Commissioner in the Galilee from 1939 to 1942. He also carried out political missions to the Yemen in 1933–34 and 1940. He was appointed Chief Secretary to the Government of Aden in 1942, and was appointed Governor and Commander-in-Chief of Aden in 1944.

=== Aden riots ===
In the Aden riots following UN Resolution 181 (II) in 1947, Champion dispatched the Aden Protectorate Levies, a military force of local Arab-Muslim recruits, to quell the disturbances. The APL was responsible for much of the killing in the riot, which resulted in the death of 82 Jews, 33 Arabs, 4 Muslim Indians, and one Somali.

He retired from the Colonial Service in 1951.

== Retirement ==
After his retirement from government service, Champion entered the Lincoln Theological College in 1952, being ordained a deacon in January and a priest in December. The same year, he was appointed a curate at All Saints’, Maidstone. In 1953 he was appointed Vicar of Chilham, Kent. He retired from active ministry in 1961. In retirement he lived in Tunbridge Wells.

Champion was appointed OBE in 1934, a CMG in 1944, and a KCMG in 1946.

== Family ==
Champion married Margaret Macgregor, daughter of Very Rev. W. M. Macgregor, in 1920. They had two sons and a daughter.
