= Doreen Ingrams =

British writer

- Born: 24 January 1906; United Kingdom
- Died: 25 July 1997 (aged 91); United Kingdom
- Occupations: Writer, Ethnographer, BBC Senior Assistant
- Notable work: A Time in Arabia (1970)
- Spouse: Harold Ingrams (m. 1930; died 1973)
- Children: 1
- Parent: Edward Shortt (father)
- Awards: Lawrence Memorial Medal (1939); Gold Medal (1940)

Doreen Ingrams (née Shortt; 24 January 1906 - 25 July 1997) was a British writer whose pioneering survey-work in South Arabia led to a memoir, A Time in Arabia (1970), and to the "Ingrams' Peace", a truce between warring tribes in the Hadhramaut in southern Arabia.

== Early life ==
The daughter of Edward Shortt MP, who was Home Secretary 1919-22, she became an actress, with friends including Michael MacLiammoir and Peggy Ashcroft. in 1930, she married Harold Ingrams, a colonial administrator, and she gave up her stage career to accompany him to his posting in Mauritius.

== South Arabia ==
In 1934 Harold and Doreen Ingrams were transferred to South Arabia, where Harold was charged with investigating conditions in the inland territory of the Aden Protectorate. They faced an unprecedented and challenging nine-week journey through an anarchic and feuding region, but travelling by donkey and camel, Mr and Mrs Ingrams succeeded in producing a detailed Report on the Social, Economic and Political Condition of Hadhramaut (1935), the earliest European account of the territory. In the course of this first trip, They were the first Europeans to travel through Sei’ar country and the Mahra hinterland - where on one occasion their lives were threatened by local tribesmen - and Doreen was the first European woman to enter Seiyun and Tarim. The report, which had the rare distinction of being the subject of a Times leading article, became the mainspring of closer British involvement in Hadhramaut and later in the Protectorate as a whole.

In 1936 Harold, accompanied by Doreen, was sent back to the Hadhramaut to persuade local tribal leaders to accept a general truce. Doreen’s access to the women enabled her to enlist the support of an important constituency for peace. Negotiating the truce, known as the Ingrams' Peace, which was to commence in early 1937 and initially to last for three years, is considered a remarkable achievement. The truce was extended for a further ten years, and Harold and Doreen became very popular figures among the Hadhrami.

Harold and Doreen Ingrams became the first Europeans to live in the Hadhramaut, and they explored all its network of valleys. Peace led to a new treaty with the Quaiti Sultan, in which the latter agreed to accept British advice in all matters relating to the welfare of his state (with the exception of religion and custom), and in 1937 Harold was appointed first British resident Advisor in Mukalla, a post which, apart from two years as Chief Secretary in Aden, he held until 1944. This gave Doreen, now fluent in the local Arabic, the opportunity of further travel in largely unexplored areas of Hadhramaut - sometimes on her own, with just an escort of one or two Bedouin retainers. When she travelled without her husband, she was able to obtain unprecedented access to the homes of rich and poor where no European woman had ever been before. This led her to produce her own Survey of Social and Economic Conditions in the Aden Protectorate (1949). This period of her life formed the material for her memoir, A Time in Arabia (1970, new edition by Eland in 2013). Collectively, the output of Harold and Doreen Ingrams concerning South Arabia have made a unique contribution to the history and sociology of the region.

During the Second World War, the area suffered from famine. Doreen was directly involved in organising relief centres and emergency medical care in Mukalla (where she later established the first bedouin girls’ school with Al-Sia‘ad Al-Ameria) for the victims of famine, especially women and children.

== Later life ==
In her third career Doreen Ingrams spent 12 years as a Senior Assistant in the Arabic Service of the BBC, where she was in charge of talks and magazine programmes, especially programmes for women. Gathering material for these, she travelled widely, and after her retirement in 1967 she kept closely in touch with developments in the Arab world.

In 1972 she made use of little-known archive material to produce a work of lasting historical significance in Palestine Papers 1917-1922: Seeds of Conflict (1972, new edition by Eland in 2009), pinpointing the responsibility of British ministers and officials for the subsequent tragedy in Palestine. She was a founder-member of the Council for the Advancement of Arab-British Understanding (Caabu) and served for many years on its executive committee. With her daughter Leila, she edited and published in 16 volumes the Records of Yemen 1798-1960 (1993).

At a reception in her honour in 1994 the members of the Arab Club in Britain presented her with a silver tray as a symbol of "her outstanding contribution to the promotion of Arab-British understanding". For their pioneer work in Southern Arabia Harold and Doreen Ingrams were awarded jointly the Gold Medal of the Royal Geographical Society (1940) and the Lawrence Memorial Medal of the Royal Society for Asian Affairs (1939) - the only time either organisation offered a joint award. In addition, Doreen received in 1993 the Sir Richard Burton Medal of the Royal Asiatic Society.
