= William Henry Luce =

British governor of Aden

Sir William Henry Luce GBE KCMG
- Portrait by Walter Bird, 1960

Governor of Aden
- In office 1956–1960
- Monarch: Elizabeth II
- Preceded by: Tom Hickinbotham
- Succeeded by: Charles Johnston

Personal details
- Born: William Tucker Luce; 25 August 1907 Alverstoke, Hampshire
- Died: 7 July 1977 (aged 69) Fovant, Wiltshire
- Relations: Admiral David Luce (brother)
- Children: Richard Luce, Baron Luce; Diana Luce
- Parent(s): Rear Admiral John Luce; Mary Dorothea Tucker
- Education: Christ's College, Cambridge
- Awards: Knight Grand Cross of the Order of the British Empire; Knight Commander of the Order of St Michael and St George

Sir William Henry Tucker Luce GBE KCMG (25 August 1907 – 7 July 1977) was a British colonial administrator and diplomat. He served as the governor and commander-in-chief of Aden from 1956 to 1960.

Luce was the son of Rear Admiral John Luce and Mary Dorothea Tucker. He was educated at Clifton College. His brother was Sir David Luce, who served as First Sea Lord of the Royal Navy. His granddaughter is comedian Miranda Hart.

He served as a member of the Sudan Political Service. In 1947 he was appointed Officer of the Order of the British Empire.

In 1954 for his services as Adviser on External and Constitutional Affairs for the Sudan Government, he was appointed Companion of the Order of St Michael and St George Luce ended his career in Sudan as adviser to the governor-general on constitutional and external affairs and was knighted in 1956 as Knight Commander of the Order of the British Empire. In 1957 he was appointed KCMG.

After four years as Governor of Aden he became political resident in the Persian Gulf from 1961 to 1966. In 1961 he was appointed Knight Grand Cross of the Order of the British Empire.

He married Margaret Napier, daughter of Trevylyan Napier, who was the commander-in-chief, America and West Indies Station (1919–1920). By her he had two children:

- Richard Luce, Baron Luce (b. 14 October 1936)
- Diana Luce, married David Hart Dyke, mother to Miranda Hart.

Luce died in 1977, aged 69.
