= Bernard Rawdon Reilly =

British diplomat and colonial official (1882-1966)

Sir Bernard Rawdon Reilly KCMG CIE OBE (1882–1966) was a British diplomat and colonial official, active in the government of Aden between 1908 and 1940. He became the first Governor of Aden in 1937 and held the position until 1940.

== Biography ==
Born on 25 March 1882 in Durrington, Wiltshire, Sir Bernard Reilly was educated at Bedford School and enlisted with the British Indian Army in 1902. In 1908, he transferred to the political department and was posted to Aden, then controlled by the Bombay Presidency.

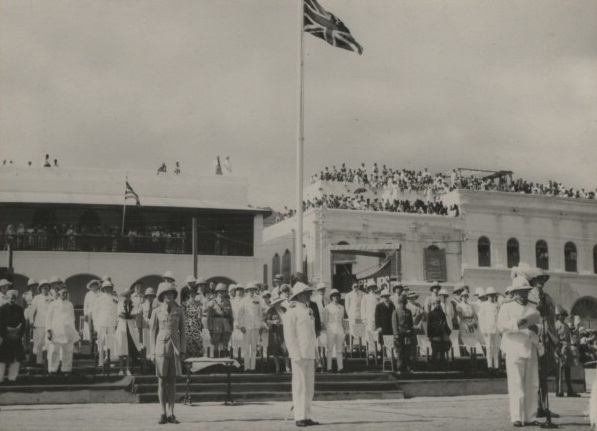
Reilly presiding at Aden's centennial ceremony in 1939

Reilly was appointed Resident in Aden between 1931 and 1932, Chief Commissioner of Aden (after the administration of Aden was transferred to the Government of India in Delhi) between 1932 and 1937, and Governor of Aden (after Aden became a British colony administered by the Colonial Office in London) between 1937 and 1940. In 1940, Reilly left Aden to join the Colonial Office, and spent World War II in London.

Sir Bernard Reilly died in London on 28 October 1966 and was buried at Winchester. He was the grandson of Lt. Col. Bradshaw Reilly.
