= Protectorate =

Concept in international relations

A protectorate, in the context of international relations, is a state or dependent territory that foregoes an independent foreign policy and often defence in favour of treaty with a protecting power, in order to ensure its defence against regional aggressors. It is a dependent territory that enjoys self government over most of its internal affairs, while still recognizing the suzerainty of a more powerful sovereign state without being a possession. In exchange, the protectorate accepts treaty obligations which bind it to the protecting power in foreign policy. Protectorates are established formally by a treaty between the powers involved. Under certain conditions—as with Egypt under British rule (1882–1914)—a state can also be labelled as a de facto protectorate or a veiled protectorate.

A protectorate is different from a colony, insofar as it retains, at least on paper, self-governance and legal identity as a separate state, is not directly possessed, and rarely experiences colonization by the suzerain state. A state that is under the protection of another state while retaining its international legal personality and some independent foreign policy is sometimes called a "protected state" as distinct from a true protectorate, which has no foreign policy of its own save its alliance with its protector; a "protected state" in this sense typically has a greater degree of independence. (Note: Protected state in this technical sense is distinguished from the informal usage of "protected state" to refer to a state receiving protection.)

== History ==
Protectorates are one of the oldest features of international relations, dating back to classical antiquity. The Delian League, Classical Athens's empire, operated as a network of poleis, internally self-governing but surrendering their foreign policy to Athens. Likewise, the Roman Republic had an extensive network of protectorates, known as socii, which provided up to 60% of the Republic's manpower.

In the Middle Ages, Andorra was a protectorate of France and Spain. The modern understanding of protected states developed during the Napoleonic Wars, when the French Empire set up numerous protectorates across Europe, including Confederation of the Rhine, the Kingdoms of Italy, Spain, Etruria, and Holland, the Duchy of Warsaw, and puppet republics in Switzerland and (ephemerally) Ireland.

== Typology ==
=== Foreign relations ===
In practice, a protectorate often has direct foreign relations only with the protector state, and transfers the management of all its more important international affairs to the latter. Similarly, the protectorate rarely takes military action on its own but relies on the protector for its defence. This is distinct from annexation, in that the protector has no formal power to control the internal affairs of the protectorate.

Protectorates differ from League of Nations mandates and their successors, United Nations trust territories, whose administration is supervised, in varying degrees, by the international community. A protectorate formally enters into the protection through a bilateral agreement with the protector, while international mandates are stewarded by the world community-representing body, with or without a de facto administering power.

=== Protected state ===
A protected state has a form of protection where it continues to retain an "international personality" and enjoys an agreed amount of independence in conducting its foreign policy.

For political and pragmatic reasons, the protection relationship is not usually advertised, but described with euphemisms such as "an independent state with special treaty relations" with the protecting state. A protected state appears on world maps just as any other independent state.

International administration of a state can also be regarded as an internationalized form of protection, where the protector is an international organisation rather than a state.

=== Colonial protection ===
Multiple regions—such as the Colony and Protectorate of Nigeria, the Colony and Protectorate of Lagos, and similar—were subjects of colonial protection. Conditions of protection are generally less generous for areas of colonial protection, but were also much more flexible arrangements. However, protectorates in the modern period were often reduced to a de facto condition similar to a state colony, but with the pre-existing native state continuing as an agent of indirect rule. Occasionally, a protectorate, and indeed colonies, during this time had been established by another form of indirect rule: a chartered company, which becomes a de facto corporate trading entity in its home state (yet geographically overseas), yet allowed to be an independent political actor, with its own foreign policy, and generally its own armed forces, and enabled to participate in local politics and affairs. This had the advantage of the ability to establish a new subordinated state by private company authority, which brought little cost to the state and could then be brought under the home state's authority after such a chartered company's abolition.

In fact, protectorates were often declared despite no agreement being duly entered into by the state supposedly being protected, but some were agreed to by a protectorate's native institutional authority (which was often absolutist or autocratic in its headship) that was in legitimate power within those states. Protecting powers frequently decided to rearrange several protectorates into new, artificial unified states without consulting the protectorates native headship or being mindful of the theoretical duty of a protector to help maintain a protectorate's status and integrity. The Berlin agreement of 26 February 1885, allowed colonial powers of the time to establish protectorates in Sub-Saharan Africa (the last region to be divided among them) by mere diplomatic notification, even without actual possession of the territory on the ground. This aspect of history is referred to as the Scramble for Africa. A similar case is the formal use of such terms as colony and protectorate for a union—convenient only for the colonizer or protector—of adjacent territories, over which it held (de facto) regional influence by protective or "raw" power.

=== Amical protection ===
In an amical protection—as in the UK's previous relationship with the United States of the Ionian Islands from 1815 to 1864—the terms are often very favourable for the protectorate. Frequently established in the Early-Mid Modern period, the political interest of the protector was typically a moral one (as rather a matter of culturally accepted moral obligation, prestige, ideology, internal popularity, or of dynastic, historical, or ethnocultural ties). The protector's interest could also be in countering a rival or enemy power—such as preventing the rival from obtaining or maintaining control of areas of strategic importance. This may involve a very weak protectorate surrendering control of its external affairs of state but may not have constituted any practical sacrifice, as the protectorate may not have been able to have a similar use of them without the protector's power.

The great powers frequently extended amical protection to other Christian (generally European) states, and to states of no significant importance. After 1815, non-Christian states (such as the Chinese Qing dynasty) also provided amical protection to other, much weaker states.

In post-modern times, a form of amical protection can be seen as an important or defining feature of microstates. According to the definition proposed by Dumienski (2014): "microstates are modern protected states, i.e. sovereign states that have been able to unilaterally depute certain attributes of sovereignty to larger powers in exchange for benign protection of their political and economic viability against their geographic or demographic constraints".

== List of protectorates ==
=== Argentina ===
- Liga Federal (1815–1820)
- República de Tucumán (1820–1821)
- Perú (1820–1822)

=== Brazil ===
Imperial protectorates

- Uruguay (1851–1870)
- Paraguay (1869–1876)

Republican protectorates

- Independent State of Acre (1903)

=== British Empire ===
==== List of former British protectorates ====
===== Americas =====
- Mosquito Coast (1638–1787, 1844–1860) (over Central America's Miskito people)

===== Arab world =====
- Aden Protectorate (1872–1963); precursor state of South Yemen
  - Eastern Protectorate States (mostly in Haudhramaut); later the Protectorate of South Arabia (1963–1967)
    - Kathiri
    - Mahra
    - Qu'aiti
    - Upper Yafa (consisted of five Sheikhdoms)
      - Al-Busi
      - Al-Dhubi
      - Hadrami
      - Maflahi
      - Mawsata
    - Hawra
    - Irqa
  - Western Protectorate States; later the Federation of the Emirates of South Arabia (1959–1962) and the Federation of South Arabia (1962–1967), including Aden Colony
    - Wahidi Sultanates
      - Wahidi Balhaf
      - Wahidi Azzan
      - Wahidi Bir Ali
      - Wahidi Haban
    - Beihan
    - Dhala and Qutaibi
    - Fadhli
    - Lahej
    - Lower Yafa
    - Audhali
    - Haushabi
    - Upper Aulaqi Sheikhdom
    - Upper Aulaqi Sultanate
    - Lower Aulaqi
    - Alawi
    - Aqrabi
    - Dathina
    - Shaib
- Sultanate of Egypt (1914–1922)
- Anglo-Egyptian Sudan (1899–1956) (condominium with Egypt)

===== Asia =====
- North Borneo (1888–1946)
- Various Princely states (1845–1947) – The princely states were lower in status than protectorates as the British reserved the right to interfere in internal matters under the principle of British Paramountcy.
- Sultanate of the Maldive Islands (1887–1948) – Became a protected state after 1948.

===== Europe =====
- Anglo-Corsican Kingdom (1794–1796)
- British Cyprus (1878–1914) (put under British military administration 1914–22 then proclaimed a Crown colony 1922–60)
- Malta Protectorate (1800–1813); Crown Colony of Malta proclaimed in 1813) (de jure part of the Kingdom of Sicily but under British protection)
- United States of the Ionian Islands (1815–1864) (a Greek state and amical protectorate of Great Britain between 1815 and 1864)

===== Sub-Saharan Africa =====
- Barotziland–North-Western Rhodesia (1899–1911)
- Bechuanaland Protectorate (1885–1966)
- British Somaliland (1884–1920)
- British Central Africa Protectorate (1893–1907)
- East Africa Protectorate (1895–1920)
- Gambia Protectorate* (1894–1965)
- Kenya Protectorate* (1920–1963)
- Lagos Protectorate* (1862–1906)
- Nigeria Protectorate* (1914–1960)
- Niger Coast Protectorate (1884–1900)
- Northern Nigeria Protectorate (1900–1914)
- Northern Rhodesia (1924–1964)
- Northern Territories of the Gold Coast (1901–1957)
- North-Eastern Rhodesia (1900–1911)
- Nyasaland Protectorate (1907–1964)
- Sierra Leone Protectorate* (1896–1961)
- Southern Nigeria Protectorate (1900–1914)
- Swaziland Protectorate (1906–1968)
- Protectorate of Uganda (1894–1962)
- Walvis Bay (1878–1884)
- Wituland (1890–1905/1923)
- Sultanate of Zanzibar (1890–1963)

*protectorates that existed alongside a colony of the same name

===== Oceania =====
- British New Guinea (1884–1888)
- British Solomon Islands (1893–1978)
- Cook Islands Federation (1888–1901)
- Gilbert and Ellice Islands (1892–1916)
- Niue (1900–1901)
- Tokelau (1889–1916)

==== List of former British protected states ====
As protected states, the following states were never officially part of the British Empire and retained near-total control over internal affairs; however, the British controlled their foreign policy. Their status was rarely advertised while it was in effect, but it became clear only after it was lifted.

- Emirate of Afghanistan (1879–1919) (Note: The British held a de jure protected state over Afghanistan. Despite agreeing to the terms of the Treaty of Gandamak, Abdur Rahman Khan held Afghanistan as a de facto independent state by holding external affairs with other nations such as Persia and Russia, and often opposing the British.)
- Brunei (1888–1984)
- Bhutan (1910–1947)
- Emirate of Nejd and Hasa (1915–1921)
- Sultanate of Nejd (1921–1926)
- Kingdom of Hejaz and Nejd (1926–1927)
- Kingdom of Egypt (1922–1936)
- Federation of Malaya (1948–1957)
  - Federated Malay States (1895–1946)
    - Negeri Sembilan (1888–1895)
    - Pahang (1888–1895)
    - Perak (1874–1895)
    - Selangor (1874–1895)
  - Unfederated Malay States (1909–1946)
    - Johor (1909–1946)
    - Kedah (1909–1946)
    - Kelantan (1909–1946)
    - Perlis (1909–1946)
    - Terengganu (1909–1946)
- Tonga (1900–1970)
- British Residency of the Persian Gulf (1822–1971); headquarters based at Bushehr, Persia
  - Persia (1919–1921)
  - Bahrain and its Dependencies
  - Emirate of Kuwait (1899–1961)
  - Qatar (1916–1971)
  - Trucial States; precursor state of the UAE (1820–1971)
    - Abu Dhabi (1820–1971)
    - Ajman (1820–1971)
    - Dubai (1835–1971)
    - Fujairah (1952–1971)
    - Ras al-Khaimah (1820–1971)
    - Sharjah (1820–1971)
      - Kalba (1936–1951)
    - Umm al-Quwain (1820–1971)
  - Muscat and Oman (1891–1970)
- Raj of Sarawak (1888–1946)
- Sultanate of the Maldive Islands (1948–1965)
- Swaziland (1967–1968)

=== China ===
- Han dynasty:
  - Protectorate of the Western Regions
- Tang dynasty:
  - Beiting Protectorate
  - Protectorate General to Pacify the West
  - Protectorate General to Pacify the North
  - Protectorate General to Pacify the East
  - Protectorate General to Pacify the South
- Song dynasty
  - Longyou Protectorate
- Yuan dynasty:
  - Goryeo (1270–1356)
- Qing dynasty:
  - Tibet (Note: Some scholars regard the relationship as one of Priest-patron rather than a protectorate.)

=== Dutch Empire ===
Various sultanates in the Dutch East Indies (present day Indonesia):

==== Sumatra ====
- Tarumon Kingdom (1830–1946)
- Langkat Sultanate (26 October 1869 – December 1945)
- Deli Sultanate (22 August 1862 – December 1945)
- Asahan Sultanate (27 September 1865 – December 1945)
- Bila (1864–1946)
- Tasik (Kota Pinang) (1865 – December 1945)
- Siak Sultanate (1 February 1858 – 1946)
- Sungai Taras (Kampong Raja) (1864–1916)
- Panei (1864–1946)
- Sultanate of Serdang (1865 – December 1945)
- Indragiri Sultanate (1838 – September 1945)
- Jambi Sultanate (1833–1899)
- Kuala (1886–1946)
- Pelalawan (1859 – November 1945)
- Siantar (1904–1946)
- Tanah Jawa (1904–1946)

==== Riau Archipelago ====
- Riau-Lingga (1824–1911)

==== Java ====
- Banten (1682–1811)
- Cirebon (1684–1819)
- Yogjakarta Sultanate (13 February 1755 – 1942)
- Mataram Sultanate (later Surakarta Sunanate) (26 February 1677 – 19 August 1945)
- Principality of Mangkunegara (24 February 1757 – 1946)
- Duchy of Pakualaman (22 June 1812 – 1942)
- Semarang (1682–1809)

==== Bali ====
- Klungkung (1843–1908)
- Badung (1843–1906)
- Bangli (1843–1908)
- Buleleng (1841–1872 and 1890–1893)
- Gianyar (1843–1908)
- Jembrana (1849–1882)
- Karang Asem (1843–1908)
- Tabanan (1843–1906)

==== Lombok ====
- Mataram Lombok (1843–1894)
- Sumbawa (1908–c. 1948)
- Bima (8 December 1669 – 1949)
- Dompu (1905–1942)

==== Flores and Solor ====
- Larantuka (1859–1904)
- Tanah Kuna Lima (1917–1924)
- Ndona (1917–1924)
- Sikka (1879–c. 1947)

==== Borneo ====
- Sultanate of Banjar (1826–1860)
- Pontianak Sultanate (16 August 1819 – 1942)
- Sambas Sultanate (1819–1949)
- Kubu (4 June 1823 – 1949)
- Landak (1819–c. 1949)
- Mempawah Kingdom (1819–1942)
- Sanggau Kingdom (182?–1949)
- Sekadau (182?–c. 1949)
- Simpang (1822–c. 1949)
- Sintang (1822–1949)
- Sukadana (1828–c.1949)
- Kota Waringin Sultanate (1824–1949)
- Kutai Kertanegara Sultanate (8 August 1825 – 1949)
- Gunung Tabur (1844–c.1945)
- Bulungan Sultanate (1844–c.1949)
- Simbaliung (1844–c. 1949)
- Kubu (1823–1949)
- Tayan (1823–c. 1949)

==== Celebes ====
- Gowa Sultanate (1669–1906; 1936–1949)
- Bone Sultanate (1669–1905)
- Bolaang Mongonduw (1825–c. 1949)
- Laiwui (1858–c. 1949)
- Luwu (1861–c. 1949)
- Soppeng (1860–c. 1949)
- Butung (1824–c. 1949)
- Siau (1680–c. 1949)
- Banggai (1907–c. 1949)
- Tallo (1668–1780)
- Wajo (1860–c. 1949)
- Tabukan (1677–c. 1949)

==== Ajattappareng Confederacy (1905–c. 1949) ====
- Malusetasi
- Rapang
- Swaito (union of Sawito and Alita, 1908)
- Sidenreng
- Supa

==== Mabbatupappeng Confederacy (1906–c. 1949) ====
- Barru
- Soppengriaja (union of Balusu, Kiru, Kamiri, 1906)
- Tanette

==== Mandar Confederacy (1906–c. 1949) ====
- Balangnipa
- Binuang
- Cenrana
- Majene
- Mamuju
- Pambauang
- Tapalang

==== Massenrempulu Confederacy (1905–c. 1949) ====
- Allah
- Batulapa
- Bontobatu
- Enrekang
- Kasa
- Maiwa
- Malua

==== Moluccas ====
- Ternate Sultanate (12 October 1676 – 1949)
- Bacan Sultanate (1667–1949)
- Tidore (1657–c.1949)

==== West Timor and Alor ====
- Amanatun (1749–c. 1949)
- Amanuban (1749–c. 1949)
- Amarasi (1749–c. 1949)
- Amfoan (1683–c. 1949)
- Beboki (1756–c. 1949)
- Belu (1756–c.1949)
- Insana (1756–c.1949)
- Sonbai Besar (1756–1906)
- Sonbai Kecil (1659–1917)
- Roti (Korbafo before 1928) (c. 1750–c.1949)
- TaEbenu (1688–1917)

==== New Guinea ====
- Dutch New Guinea:
  - Kaimana Sultanate (1828–1949)

=== Egypt ===
- All-Palestine (1948–1959) – although it claimed the former territory of Mandatory Palestine, the polity only held control of the Gaza Strip. It was recognized by Egypt, Iraq, Lebanon, Saudi Arabia, Syria and Yemen; but not Transjordan who would annex the West Bank in 1950.

=== France ===
==== Africa ====
"Protection" was the formal legal structure under which French colonial forces expanded in Africa between the 1830s and 1900. Almost every pre-existing state that was later part of French West Africa was placed under protectorate status at some point, although direct rule gradually replaced protectorate agreements. Formal ruling structures, or fictive recreations of them, were largely retained—as with the low-level authority figures in the French Cercles—with leaders appointed and removed by French officials.

- Benin traditional states:
  - Independent of Danhome, under French protectorate, from 1889
  - Porto-Novo a French protectorate, 23 February 1863 – 2 January 1865. Cotonou a French Protectorate, 19 May 1868. Porto-Novo French protectorate, 14 April 1882.
- Central African Republic traditional states:
  - French protectorate over Dar al-Kuti (1912 Sultanate suppressed by the French), 12 December 1897
  - French protectorate over the Sultanate of Bangassou, 1894
- Chad: Baghirmi state 20 September 1897 a French protectorate
- Côte d'Ivoire: 10 January 1889 French protectorate of Ivory Coast
- Guinea: 5 August 1849 French protectorate over coastal region; (Riviéres du Sud).
- Niger, Sultanate of Damagaram (Zinder), 30 July 1899 under French protectorate over the native rulers, titled Sarkin Damagaram or Sultan
- Senegal: 4 February 1850 First of several French protectorate treaties with local rulers
- Comoros traditional states:
  - Grande Comore, Mohéli and Anjouan were French protectorates from 6 January 1886 until 25 July 1912, when annexed.
- Present Djibouti was originally, from 24 June 1884, the Territory of Obock and Protectorate of Tadjoura (Territoires Français d'Obock, Tadjoura, Dankils et Somalis), a French protectorate recognized by Britain on 9 February 1888, renamed on 20 May 1896 as French Somaliland (Côte Française des Somalis).
- Mauritania: 12 May 1903 French protectorate; within Mauritania several traditional states:
  - Adrar emirate from 9 January 1909 French protectorate (before Spanish)
  - The Taganit confederation's emirate (founded by Idaw `Ish dynasty), from 1905 under French protectorate.
  - Brakna confederation's emirate
  - Emirate of Trarza: 15 December 1902 placed under French protectorate status.
- Morocco – most of the sultanate was under French protectorate (30 March 1912 – 7 April 1956) although, in theory, it remained a sovereign state under the Treaty of Fez; this fact was confirmed by the International Court of Justice in 1952.
  - The northern part of Morocco was under Spanish protectorate in the same period.
- Traditional Madagascar States
  - Kingdom of Imerina under French protectorate, 1882. French Madagascar colony, 28 February 1897.
- Tunisia (12 May 1881 – 20 March 1956): became a French protectorate by treaty

==== Asia ====
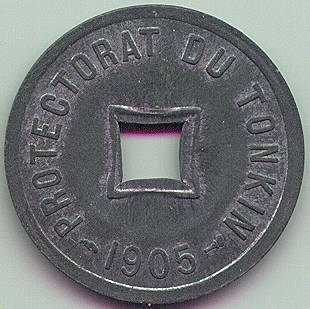
1 Sapèque – Protectorate of Tonkin (1905)

- French Indochina until 1953/54:
  - Annam and Tonkin 6 June 1884
  - Cambodia 11 August 1863
  - Laos 3 October 1893
  - Vietnam 6 June 1884

==== Europe ====
- Neapolitan Republic (1647–1648)
- Rhenish Republic (1923–1924)
- Saar Protectorate (1946–1956), not colonial or amical, but a former part of Germany that would by referendum return to it, in fact a re-edition of a former League of Nations mandate. Most French protectorates were colonial.

==== Oceania ====
- French Polynesia, mainly the Society Islands (several others were immediately annexed). All eventually were annexed by 1889.
  - Tahiti (native king styled Ari`i rahi) becomes a French protectorate, 1842–1880
  - Raiatea and Tahaa (after temporary annexation by Tahiti; (title Ari`i) a French protectorate, 1880)
  - Mangareva (one of the Gambier Islands; ruler title `Akariki) a French protectorate, 16 February 1844 (unratified) and 30 November 1871
- Wallis and Futuna:
  - Wallis declared to be a French protectorate by King of Uvea and Captain Mallet, 4 November 1842. Officially in a treaty becomes a French protectorate, 5 April 1887.
  - Sigave and Alo on the islands of Futuna and Alofi signed a treaty establishing a French protectorate on 16 February 1888.

=== Germany ===
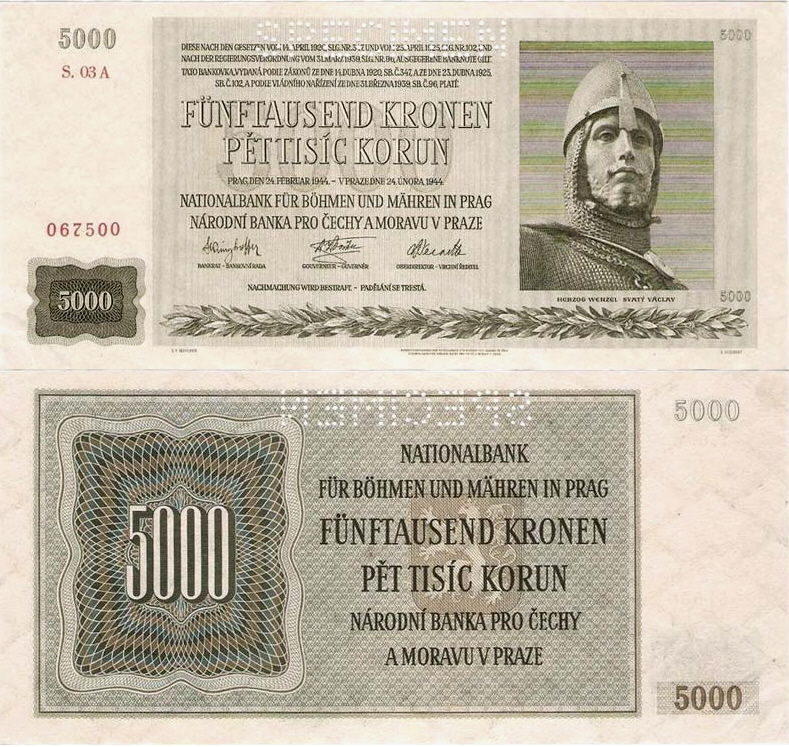
5000 kronen – Protectorate of Bohemia and Moravia (1939–1945)

The German Empire used the word Schutzgebiet, literally protectorate, for all of its colonial possessions until they were lost during World War I, regardless of the actual level of government control. Cases involving indirect rule included:

- German New Guinea (1884–1920), now part of Papua New Guinea
- Togoland (1884–1914), now part of Ghana and Togo
- North Solomon Islands (1885–1920), now part of Papua New Guinea and the Solomon Islands
- Wituland (1885–1890), now part of Kenya
- German Samoa (1900–1920), present-day Samoa
- Marshall Islands
- Nauru, various officials posted with the Head Chiefs
- Gando Emirate (1895–1897)
- Gulmu (1895–1897)

Before and during World War II, Nazi Germany designated the rump of occupied Czechoslovakia and Denmark as protectorates:

- Protectorate of Bohemia and Moravia (1939–1945), however it was also considered a partially annexed territory of Germany
- Denmark (1940–1943)

=== India ===
- Bhutan (1947–2011)
- Kingdom of Sikkim (1950–1975), later acceded to India as State of Sikkim.

=== Italy ===
- The Albanian Republic (1917–1920) and the Albanian Kingdom (1939–1943)
- Monaco under amical Protectorate of the Kingdom of Sardinia 20 November 1815 to 1860.
- Ethiopia : 2 May 1889 Treaty of Wuchale, in the Italian language version, stated that Ethiopia was to become an Italian protectorate, while the Ethiopian Amharic language version merely stated that the Emperor could, if he so chose, go through Italy to conduct foreign affairs. When the differences in the versions came to light, Emperor Menelik II abrogated first the article in question (XVII), and later the whole treaty. The event culminated in the First Italo-Ethiopian War, in which Ethiopia was victorious and defended her sovereignty in 1896.
- Libya: on 15 October 1912 Italian protectorate declared over Cirenaica (Cyrenaica) until 17 May 1919.
- Benadir Coast in Somalia: 3 August 1889 Italian protectorate (in the northeast; unoccupied until May 1893), until 16 March 1905 when it changed to Italian Somaliland.
  - Majeerteen Sultanate since 7 April 1889 under Italian protectorate (renewed 7 April 1895), then in 1927 incorporated into the Italian colony.
  - Sultanate of Hobyo since December 1888 under Italian protectorate (renewed 11 April 1895), then in October 1925 incorporated into the Italian colony (known as Obbia).

=== Japan ===
- Korean Empire (1905–1910)

=== Poland ===
- Kaffa (1462–1475)

=== Portugal ===
- Cabinda (Portuguese Congo) (1885–1974), Portugal first claimed sovereignty over Cabinda in the February 1885 Treaty of Simulambuco, which gave Cabinda the status of a protectorate of the Portuguese Crown under the request of "the princes and governors of Cabinda".
- Kingdom of Kongo (1857–1914)
- Gaza Empire (1824–1895), now part of Mozambique
- Angoche Sultanate (1903–1910)
- Kingdom of Larantuka (1515–1859)

=== Russia and the Soviet Union ===
- Cossack Hetmanate (1654–1764)
- Kingdom of Kartli-Kakheti (1783–1801)
- Kingdom of Imereti (1804–1810)
- Revolutionary Serbia (1807–1812)
- Principality of Serbia (1826–1856), now part of Serbia
- Principality of Moldova (1829–1856), now part of Moldova, Romania and Ukraine
- Principality of Wallachia (1829–1856)
- Emirate of Bukhara (1873–1920)
- Khanate of Khiva (1873–1920)
- Uryankhay Krai (1914)
- Second East Turkestan Republic (1944–1949), now part of Xinjiang, China

==== De facto ====
Some sources mention the following territories as de facto Russian protectorates:

- South Ossetia (2008–present)
- Transnistria (1992–present)
- Abkhazia (1994–present)
- Donetsk People's Republic (2015–2022)
- Luhansk People's Republic (2015–2022)
- Republic of Artsakh (2020–2023)

=== Spain ===
- Spanish Morocco protectorate from 27 November 1912 until 2 April 1958 (Northern zone until 7 April 1956, Southern zone (Cape Juby) until 2 April 1958).
- Sultanate of Sulu (1851–1899)
- Spanish protectorate in Cambodia (1593/97-1600)
- Elobey, Annobón, and Corisco (1843-1926)

=== Turkey and the Ottoman Empire ===
- Principality of Wallachia (1396–1397, 1417–1829, 1856–1861)
- Principality of Moldavia (1456–1457, 1503–1829, 1856–1861)
- Samtskhe-Saatabago (1500–1625)
- Kingdom of Imereti (1555–1804)
- Principality of Svaneti (1555–1804)
- Principality of Abkhazia (1555–1810)
- Principality of Mingrelia (1557–1803)
- Maldives (1560–1590)
- Aceh Sultanate (1569–1903)
- Principality of Transylvania (1570–1699)
- Principality of Guria (1614–1810)
- Cossack Hetmanate (1669–1685)
- Principality of Serbia (1815–1826, 1856–1878)
- United Principalities of Romania (1862–1877)
- Principality of Bulgaria (1878–1908)

==== De facto ====
- Hatay State (1938–1939)
- Northern Cyprus (1974–present)
- Northern Syria (2016–2026)

=== Israel ===
==== De facto ====
Some sources mention the following territories as de facto Israeli protectorates:

- Palestinian Authority (1994–present)
- Administrative Council of Jabal Bashan (2025–present)
- State of Free Lebanon (1979–1984)

=== United Nations ===
Administered territories

- (United Nations) West New Guinea (1962-1963)
- Cambodia (1992-1993)
- (United Nations) Eastern Slavonia, Baranja and Western Sirmium (1996-1998)
- (United Nations) Kosovo (1999-2008)
- (United Nations) East Timor (1999-2002)

Buffer zones

- United Nations Buffer Zone in Cyprus (1964-present)
- (United Nations) UNDOF Zone (1974-present)

=== United States ===
- Republic of Negros (1899–1901)
- Republic of Zamboanga (1899–1903)
- Sultanate of Sulu (1899–1915)

==== De facto ====
Some sources mention the following territories as de facto American protectorates:

- Venezuela (2026–present)

==== Contemporary usage ====
Some agencies of the United States government, such as the Environmental Protection Agency, refer to the insular areas of the United States—such as American Samoa and the U.S. Virgin Islands—as protectorates. However, the agency responsible for the administration of those areas, the Office of Insular Affairs within the United States Department of the Interior, uses only the term "insular area" rather than protectorate.

- American Samoa
- Guam
- Northern Mariana Islands
- Puerto Rico
- U.S. Virgin Islands

== Joint protectorates ==
- Republic of Ragusa (1684–1798), a joint Habsburg Austrian–Ottoman Turkish protectorate
- The United States of the Ionian Islands and the Septinsular Republic were federal republics of seven formerly Venetian (see Provveditore) Ionian Islands (Corfu, Cephalonia, Zante, Santa Maura, Ithaca, Cerigo, and Paxos), officially under joint protectorate of the allied Christian powers, de facto a British amical protectorate from 1815 to 1864.
- (United Kingdom) (Egypt) Anglo-Egyptian Sudan (1899–1956)
- Independent State of Croatia (1941–1943)
- Free City of Cracow (1815–1846)

== See also ==
- British Protected Person
- Client state
- European Union Police Mission in Bosnia and Herzegovina
- EUFOR Althea
- High Representative for Bosnia and Herzegovina
- League of Nations mandate
- Peace Implementation Council
- Protector (titles for Heads of State and other individual persons)
- Protectorate (imperial China)
- Timeline of national independence
- Tribute
- List of territories administered by the United Nations

== Bibliography ==
- Hoffmann, Gerhard (1987). "Protectorates". Encyclopedia of Disputes Installment 10. Elsevier. pp. 336–339. doi:10.1016/B978-0-444-86241-9.50085-3. ISBN 9780444862419.
- Macdonell, John (1911). "Protectorate" . Encyclopædia Britannica. Vol. 22 (11th ed.). pp. 468–470.
- Meijknecht, Anna (2001), Towards International Personality: The Position of Minorities and Indigenous Peoples in International Law, Intersentia NV, ISBN 978-90-5095-166-1
- Onley, James (March 2009), "The Raj Reconsidered: British India's Informal Empire and Spheres of Influence in Asia and Africa" (PDF), Asian Affairs, 11 (1), archived from the original (PDF) on 9 October 2022
- Reisman, W. (1989), "Reflections on state responsibility for violations of explicit protectorate, mandate, and trusteeship obligations", Michigan Journal of International Law, 10 (1): 231–240
- Willigen, Niels van (2013), Peacebuilding and International Administration: The Cases of Bosnia and Herzegovina and Kosovo, Routledge, ISBN 978-1-134-11718-5
- Larousse, Pierre; Paul Augé; Claude Augé (1925). Nouveau Petit Larousse Illustré: Dictionnaire Encyclopédique (in French). Larousse.
