= British protectorate =

Territory over which the British government exercised limited jurisdiction

British protectorates were protectorates under the jurisdiction of the British government. Many territories that became British protectorates already had local rulers with whom the Crown negotiated through a treaty, acknowledging their status whilst simultaneously offering protection. British protectorates were therefore governed by indirect rule. In most cases, the local ruler, as well as the subjects of the ruler, were not British subjects, but rather British protected persons. British protected states represented a looser form of British suzerainty, where the local rulers retained absolute control over the states' internal affairs and the British exercised control over defence and foreign affairs.

== History ==
=== Implementation ===
When the British took over Cephalonia in 1809, they proclaimed, "We present ourselves to you, Inhabitants of Cephalonia, not as invaders, with views of conquest, but as allies who hold forth to you the advantages of British protection." When the British continued to occupy the Ionian Islands after the Napoleonic Wars, they did not formally annex the islands but described them as a protectorate. The islands were constituted by the Treaty of Paris in 1815 as the independent United States of the Ionian Islands under British protection. Similarly, Malta was a British protectorate between the French capitulation in 1800 and the Treaty of Paris of 1814. The princely states of India were another example of indirect rule during the time of Empire. So too were many of the West African holdings.

Other British protectorates followed. In the Pacific Ocean, the sixteen islands of the Gilbert Islands (now Kiribati) were declared a British protectorate by Captain Davis R.N., of HMS Royalist between 27 May and 17 June 1892. The Royalist also visited each of the Ellice Islands, and islanders requested Captain Davis to raise the British flag, but he did not have instructions to declare the Ellice Islands as a protectorate. The nine islands of the Ellice Group (now Tuvalu) were declared a British protectorate by Captain Gibson R.N., of HMS Curacoa, between 9 and 16 October of the same year. Britain defined its area of interest in the Solomon Islands in June 1893, when Captain Gibson R.N., of HMS Curacoa, declared the southern Solomon Islands as a British protectorate with the proclamation of the British Solomon Islands Protectorate.

In 1894, Prime Minister William Ewart Gladstone's government officially announced that Uganda, where Muslim and Christian strife had attracted international attention, was to become a British protectorate. The British administration installed carefully selected local kings under a programme of indirect rule through the local oligarchy, creating a network of British-controlled civil service. Most British protectorates were overseen by a Commissioner or a High Commissioner, under the Foreign Office, rather than a Governor under the Colonial Office.

British law made a distinction between a protectorate and a protected state. Constitutionally, the two were of similar status, in which Britain provided controlled defence and external relations. However, a protectorate had an internal government established, while a protected state established a form of local internal self-government based on the already existing one. Persons connected with a former British protectorate, protected state, mandated territory or trust territory may remain British Protected Persons if they did not acquire the nationality of the country at independence. The last British protectorate proper was the British Solomon Islands, now Solomon Islands, which gained independence in 1978; the last British protected state was Brunei, which gained full independence in 1984.

== List of former British protectorates ==
=== Americas ===
- Mosquito Coast (1638–1787, 1844–1860) (over Central America's Miskito people)

=== Arab world ===
- Aden Protectorate (1872–1963); precursor state of South Yemen
  - Eastern Protectorate States (mostly in Haudhramaut); later the Protectorate of South Arabia (1963–1967)
    - Kathiri
    - Mahra
    - Qu'aiti
    - Upper Yafa (consisted of five Sheikhdoms)
      - Al-Busi
      - Al-Dhubi
      - Hadrami
      - Maflahi
      - Mawsata
    - Hawra
    - Irqa
  - Western Protectorate States; later the Federation of the Emirates of South Arabia (1959–1962) and the Federation of South Arabia (1962–1967), including Aden Colony
    - Wahidi Sultanates
      - Wahidi Balhaf
      - Wahidi Azzan
      - Wahidi Bir Ali
      - Wahidi Haban
    - Beihan
    - Dhala and Qutaibi
    - Fadhli
    - Lahej
    - Lower Yafa
    - Audhali
    - Haushabi
    - Upper Aulaqi Sheikhdom
    - Upper Aulaqi Sultanate
    - Lower Aulaqi
    - Alawi
    - Aqrabi
    - Dathina
    - Shaib
- Sultanate of Egypt (1914–1922)
- Anglo-Egyptian Sudan (1899–1956) (condominium with Egypt)

=== Asia ===
- North Borneo (1888–1946)
- Various Princely states (1845–1947) – The princely states were lower in status than protectorates as the British reserved the right to interfere in internal matters under the principle of British Paramountcy.
- Sultanate of the Maldive Islands (1887–1948) – Became a protected state after 1948.

=== Europe ===
- Anglo-Corsican Kingdom (1794–1796)
- British Cyprus (1878–1914) (put under British military administration 1914–22 then proclaimed a Crown colony 1922–60)
- Malta Protectorate (1800–1813); Crown Colony of Malta proclaimed in 1813) (de jure part of the Kingdom of Sicily but under British protection)
- United States of the Ionian Islands (1815–1864) (a Greek state and amical protectorate of Great Britain between 1815 and 1864)

=== Sub-Saharan Africa ===
- Barotziland–North-Western Rhodesia (1899–1911)
- Bechuanaland Protectorate (1885–1966)
- British Somaliland (1884–1920)
- British Central Africa Protectorate (1893–1907)
- East Africa Protectorate (1895–1920)
- Gambia Protectorate* (1894–1965)
- Kenya Protectorate* (1920–1963)
- Lagos Protectorate* (1862–1906)
- Nigeria Protectorate* (1914–1960)
- Niger Coast Protectorate (1884–1900)
- Northern Nigeria Protectorate (1900–1914)
- Northern Rhodesia (1924–1964)
- Northern Territories of the Gold Coast (1901–1957)
- North-Eastern Rhodesia (1900–1911)
- Nyasaland Protectorate (1907–1964)
- Sierra Leone Protectorate* (1896–1961)
- Southern Nigeria Protectorate (1900–1914)
- Swaziland Protectorate (1906–1968)
- Protectorate of Uganda (1894–1962)
- Walvis Bay (1878–1884)
- Wituland (1890–1905/1923)
- Sultanate of Zanzibar (1890–1963)

*protectorates that existed alongside a colony of the same name

=== Oceania ===
- British New Guinea (1884–1888)
- British Solomon Islands (1893–1978)
- Cook Islands Federation (1888–1901)
- Gilbert and Ellice Islands (1892–1916)
- Niue (1900–1901)
- Tokelau (1889–1916)

== List of former British protected states ==
As protected states, the following states were never officially part of the British Empire and retained near-total control over internal affairs; however, the British controlled their foreign policy. Their status was rarely advertised while it was in effect, but it became clear only after it was lifted.

- Emirate of Afghanistan (1879–1919) (Note: The British held a de jure protected state over Afghanistan. Despite agreeing to the terms of the Treaty of Gandamak, Abdur Rahman Khan held Afghanistan as a de facto independent state by holding external affairs with other nations such as Persia and Russia, and often opposing the British.)
- Brunei (1888–1984)
- Bhutan (1910–1947)
- Emirate of Nejd and Hasa (1915–1921)
- Sultanate of Nejd (1921–1926)
- Kingdom of Hejaz and Nejd (1926–1927)
- Kingdom of Egypt (1922–1936)
- Federation of Malaya (1948–1957)
  - Federated Malay States (1895–1946)
    - Negeri Sembilan (1888–1895)
    - Pahang (1888–1895)
    - Perak (1874–1895)
    - Selangor (1874–1895)
  - Unfederated Malay States (1909–1946)
    - Johor (1909–1946)
    - Kedah (1909–1946)
    - Kelantan (1909–1946)
    - Perlis (1909–1946)
    - Terengganu (1909–1946)
- Tonga (1900–1970)
- British Residency of the Persian Gulf (1822–1971); headquarters based at Bushehr, Persia
  - Persia (1919–1921)
  - Bahrain and its Dependencies
  - Emirate of Kuwait (1899–1961)
  - Qatar (1916–1971)
  - Trucial States; precursor state of the UAE (1820–1971)
    - Abu Dhabi (1820–1971)
    - Ajman (1820–1971)
    - Dubai (1835–1971)
    - Fujairah (1952–1971)
    - Ras al-Khaimah (1820–1971)
    - Sharjah (1820–1971)
      - Kalba (1936–1951)
    - Umm al-Quwain (1820–1971)
  - Muscat and Oman (1891–1970)
- Raj of Sarawak (1888–1946)
- Sultanate of the Maldive Islands (1948–1965)
- Swaziland (1967–1968)

== Bibliography ==
- Onley, James (March 2009), "The Raj Reconsidered: British India's Informal Empire and Spheres of Influence in Asia and Africa" (PDF), Asian Affairs, 11 (1), archived from the original (PDF) on 9 October 2022
