= Yafa'a =

Coordinates: 13°39′N 45°13′E

Yafaʿ District يافع
- District
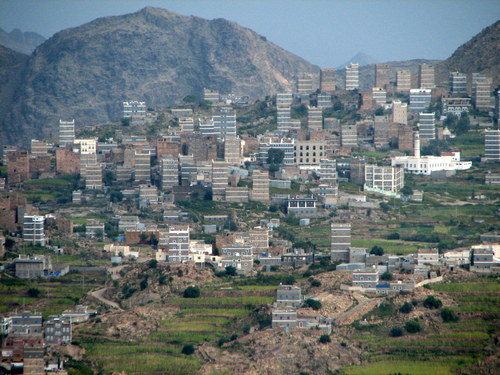
- Interactive map of Yafaʿ District
- Country: Yemen
- Governorate: Lahij

Population (2003)
  - Total: 75,014
- Time zone: UTC+3 (Yemen Standard Time)

Yafaʿ (Arabic: يافع, romanized: Yāfiʿ) is an Arab tribe, geographical area, and a district of the Lahij Governorate, Yemen. As of 2003, the district had a population of 75,014 inhabitants.

== Tribe ==
The tribe of Yafa' is an Arab tribe in southern Yemen. It is one of the biggest tribes that descended from the ancient Himyarites. Today, most members of the tribe can be found across the Arabian Peninsula, in particular Yemen, Saudi Arabia, Oman, Bahrain, The United Arab Emirates, and Qatar, wherein it is estimated that the Yafa' tribe makes up the second-largest Arabian tribe among the Qatari society, with the Al Murrah tribe coming first. According to Arab historian Abu Muhammad al-Hasan al-Hamdani, the genealogy of Yafa' is of the following: "Yafa' bin Qawel bin Zaid bin Naaitah bin Sharhabel bin Al Harth bin Yareem dhi Raain bin Zaid bin Sahal bin Amer bin Qais bin Muawiyah bin Joshom bin Abd Shams bin Wael bin Al Ghawth bin Al Humaysaa bin Himyar bin Saba." Yafa' has gone through a complex structuration of different tribal forms in the last several centuries. The division comprises Yafi' bani Qasid (Lower Yafa or Yafa' as-Sufla) and Yafi' bani Malik (Upper Yafa or Yafa' al-Ulya), each including five branches and sheikhdoms. Branches of Yafa' alamry

- Al-Harm (آل هرم)

Branches of Yafa' bani Qasid:

- Kaladi (كلدي)
- Saadi (سعدي)
- Yazeedi (يزيدي)
- Nakhibi (ناخبي)
- Yehri (يهري).

Branches of Yafa' bani Malik:

- Maflahi (مفلحي)
- Mawsata (الموسطة)
- Al-Dhubi (الضُبي)
- Al-Busi (البعسي)
- Hadhrami (الحضرمي).

The area is located northeast of the port city of Aden. In ancient times, the area was referred to as Dehsim or Saro Himyar. The once ruling Qu'aiti dynasty of Hadramaut was Yafa'i in origin. Yafa' was united with the rest of Arabia under the Rashidun Caliphate.

== See also ==
- Himyarite Kingdom
- Upper Yafa
- Lower Yafa
- List of Sunni dynasties
- Rashidun Caliphate
