= Yemeni–Adenese clan violence =

Period of conflict in Aden and Yemen (1956–1960)

Date
Location
1956–1960
Yemen
- Kingdom of Yemen (North Yemen)
- Federation of the Emirates of South Arabia (Southwest Yemen)

Belligerents
Zaidi Shi‘ite rioters Kingdom of Yemen	Shafi'i Sunni rioters (United Kingdom) Aden Protectorate (1956-1959): Colony of Aden; Federation of the Emirates of South Arabia (1959–1960): Colony of Aden

Casualties and losses
- 1,000+ deaths

The Yemeni–Adenese clan violence refers to sectarian violence in Yemen and Aden between 1956 and 1960, resulting in some 1,000 deaths.

== Background ==
In 1950, Kennedy Trevaskis, the Advisor for the Western Protectorate drew up a plan for the British protectorate states to form two federations, corresponding to the two-halves of the protectorate. Although little progress was made in bringing the plan to fruition, it was considered a provocation by Ahmad bin Yahya, the leader of the Mutawakkilite Kingdom of Yemen. In addition to his role as king, he also served as the imam of the ruling Zaidi branch of Shia Islam. He feared that a successful federation in the Shafi‘i Sunnite protectorates would serve as a beacon for discontented Shafi‘ites who inhabited the coastal regions of Yemen. To counter the threat, Ahmad stepped up Yemeni efforts to undermine British control.

== Violence ==
In the mid-1950s, Yemen supported a number of revolts by disgruntled tribes against the protectorate states. The sectarian violence in Yemen Kingdom and Aden from 1956 to 1960 resulted in some 1,000 deaths. The appeal of Yemen was limited initially in the protectorate but a growing intimacy between Yemen and the popular Arab nationalist president of Egypt Gamal Abdel Nasser and the formation of the United Arab States increased its attraction.

== See also ==
- List of wars involving Yemen
