= Al-Busi =

Former administrative division of Yemen

Coordinates: 13°41′N 44°43′E

Bu`si Sheikdom مشيخة البعسي
- c. 18th century–1967
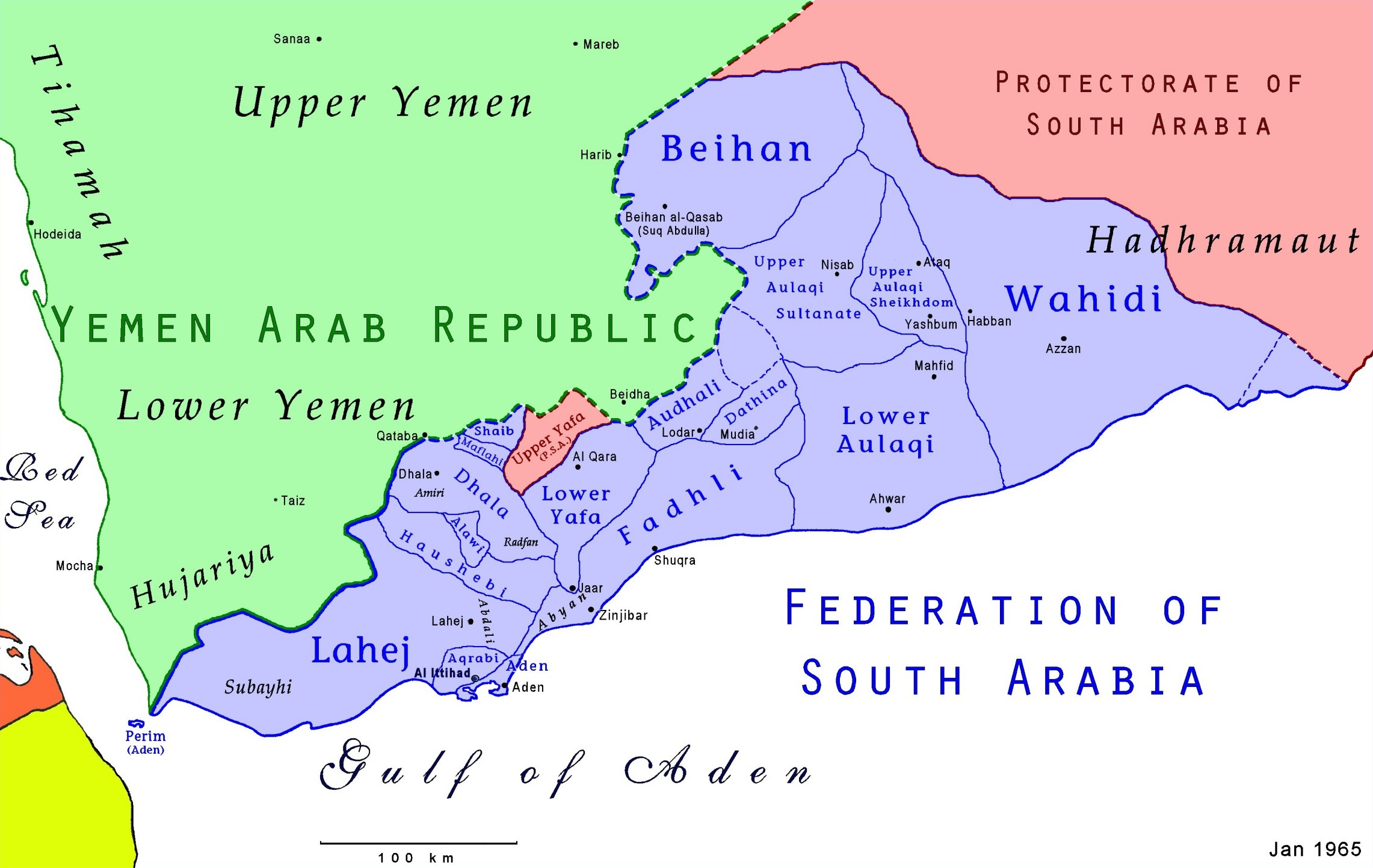
- Largest city: Hazar-ul-Abu's
- Common languages: Arabic
- Religion: Islam
- Government: Monarchy
- Sheikh
  - 1903-1954: 2 rulers, names unknown
- History
  - Established: c. 18th century
  - British protectorate: 1954
  - Disestablished: 1967

Population
  - 1917: 2,000
Succeeded by
South Yemen
- Today part of: Yemen

Al-Bu`si, Busi, Bo'sī, (Arabic: البعسي Bu`sī), or the Bu`si Sheikhdom (Arabic: مشيخة البعسي Mashyakhat al-Bu`sī), was a small state in the British Aden Protectorate. It was one of the states of Upper Yafa.

== History ==
Busi was established around the 18th century.

Protectorate treaties were signed with the other states of Upper Yafa in 1903, but Busi was excluded and remained independent. Between 1903 and 1954, two different sheikhs of Busi, father and son, attempted to obtain a protectorate treaty, but Britain denied their applications, partly because it was undesirable to multiply the number of treaty chiefs. Although Busi was not allowed to enter into the British protectorate, the sheikhs were still entitled to an annual visit to Aden. The Sheikh of Busi was one of the South Arabian rulers attending the second Lahej conference in 1930.

In August 1954, a request for a protectorate treaty by the Sheikh of Busi was forwarded by Tom Hickinbotham, the Governor of Aden, to Alan Lennox-Boyd, the Secretary of State for the Colonies. In that year, Busi became the last of the Yemeni polities to enter into a protectorate treaty with Britain. In A History of Modern Yemen (2000), Paul Dresch notes that this treaty was virtually identical to the ones Britain had signed with Busi's neighbours 50 years earlier. Busi did not join the Federation of South Arabia in 1962, but was nominally part of the Protectorate of South Arabia.

Its last sheikh was deposed in 1967 upon the founding of the People's Republic of South Yemen and the area is now part of the Republic of Yemen.

== Geography ==
The Busi country was a flat plain intersected by small valleys, the principal of which was the Wādī-ul-Ab'us. Busi was bordered by Al-Dubi in the west and Hadrami in the north. Busi had no border with the Mutawakkilite Kingdom of Yemen.

== Demographics ==
Busi was inhabited by a single tribe of the same name. In 1917, it was estimated to have a population of around 2000. The plurality of the Busi, about 900 of them, resided in the settlement of Hazar-ul-Abu's, while the rest of them were spread out over 18 other villages in the vicinity.

== Military ==
As of 1917, Busi had around 500 fighting men.

== See also ==
- Aden Protectorate
- Upper Yafa
