= Al-Dhubi =

Former state of the British Aden Protectorate

Coordinates: 13°41′N 44°43′E

Dhubi Sheikdom مشيخة الضُبي
- State of the Protectorate of South Arabia
- 18th century–1967
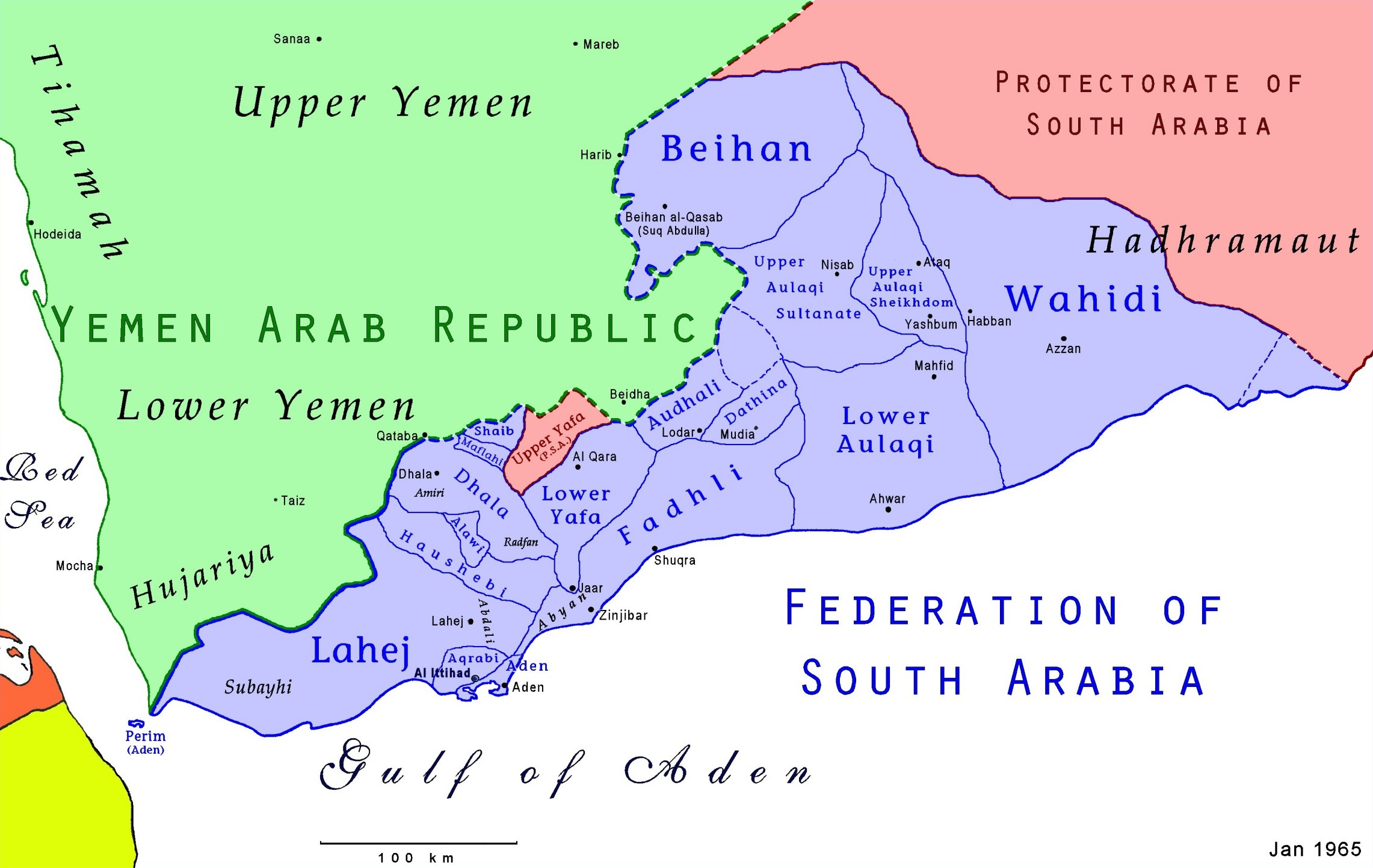
- Map of the Federation of South Arabia
  - Type: Sheikhdom
- Historical era: 20th century
  - Established: 18th century
  - Disestablished: 1967
Preceded by	Succeeded by
Federation of Arab Emirates of the South	South Yemen

Al-Dhubi, Al-Dubi (Arabic: الضُبي Dhubī), or the Dhubi Sheikhdom (Arabic: مشيخة الضُبي Mashyakhat ad-Dhubī), was a small state in the British Aden Protectorate. Dhubi was located between Mawsata in the southwest, Hadrami in the northeast, Lower Yafa in the south and Upper Yafa in the north.

Its last sheikh was deposed in 1967 upon the founding of the People's Republic of South Yemen and the area is now part of the Republic of Yemen.

== History ==
Al-Dhubi was one of the five sheikhdoms of Upper Yafa.

It entered into a protectorate treaty with Britain on 11 May 1903.

It was part nominally of the Western Aden Protectorate.

Al-Dhubi never joined the Federation of South Arabia, but became part of the Protectorate of South Arabia between 1963 and 1967.

=== Rulers ===
Al-Dhubi was ruled by sheikhs who bore the title Shaykh al-Mashyakha ad-Dhubiyya.

==== Sheikhs ====
- c.1750 - 1780 Muhammad
- c.1780 - 1810 Jabir ibn Muhammad
- c.1810 - 1840 `Atif ibn Jabir
- c.1840 - 1870 Ahmad ibn `Atif
- c.1870 - 1900 Salih ibn Ahmad ibn `Atif Jabir
- 1900 - 1915 Muhammad ibn Muthana ibn `Atif Jabir
  - Together with `Umar ibn Muthana ibn `Atif Jabir
  - 1915 - 1946 Both previous rulers jointly with Salim ibn Salih ibn `Atif Jabir
- 1946 - 1967 `Abd al-Rahman ibn Salih

== See also ==
- Aden Protectorate
- Upper Yafa
