= Aden Protectorate =

British protectorate in Arabia, 1872–1963

Aden Protectorate محمية عدن
- 1872–1963
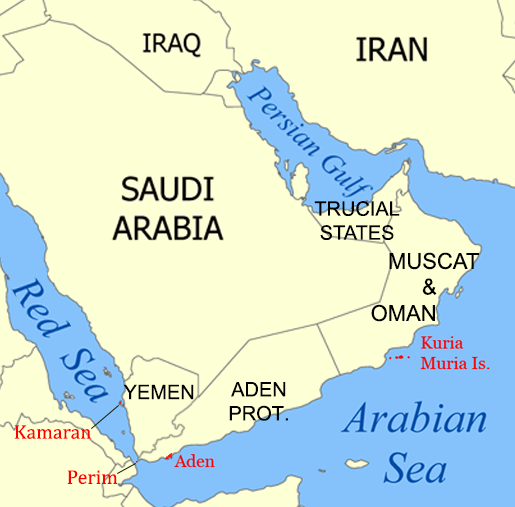
- Location of the Aden Protectorate on the Arabian Peninsula.
- Status: Self-ruling sultanates, emirates and sheikdoms under British protection
- Capital: Various
- Common languages: Arabic (Yemeni Arabic, Judeo-Yemeni Arabic); Persian; English; Ottoman Turkish
- Religion: Islam; Judaism; Christianity
- Demonym: Adeni
- History
  - Initial treaty: 1872
  - Federation formed: 11 February 1959
  - Disestablished: 18 January 1963
- Currency: Thaler, Rupee
Preceded by
Kathiri
Mahra Sultanate
Quaiti
Yemen Vilayet
Independent Tribes
Succeeded by
Federation of the Emirates of the South
Protectorate of South Arabia
- Today part of: Yemen

The Aden Protectorate (Arabic: محمية عدن Maḥmiyyat ‘Adan) was a British protectorate in southern Arabia. The protectorate evolved in the hinterland of the port of Aden and in the Hadhramaut after the conquest of Aden by the Bombay Presidency of British India in January 1839, and which continued until the 1960s. In 1940, it was divided for administrative purposes into the Western Protectorate and the Eastern Protectorate. The territory now forms part of the Republic of Yemen.

The rulers of the Aden Protectorate, as generally with the other British protectorates and protected states, retained a large degree of autonomy: their flags still flew over their government buildings, government was still performed by them or in their names, and their states maintained a distinct 'international personality' in terms of international law, in contrast to states possessed directly by the British Empire, such as Colony of Aden, where the British monarch was the sovereign.

== History ==
=== Informal beginnings ===
What became known as the Aden Protectorate began with informal arrangements of protection with nine states in the immediate hinterland of the port city of Aden, namely Abdali, Alawi, Amiri, Aqrabi, Aulaqi, Fadhli, Haushabi, Subeihi, and Yafa.

British expansion into the area was designed to secure the important port that was, at the time, governed from British India. From 1874, these protection arrangements existed with the tacit acceptance of the Ottoman Empire that maintained suzerainty of Yemen to the north, and the polities became known collectively as the "Nine Tribes" or the "Nine Cantons."

=== Formal treaties of protection ===
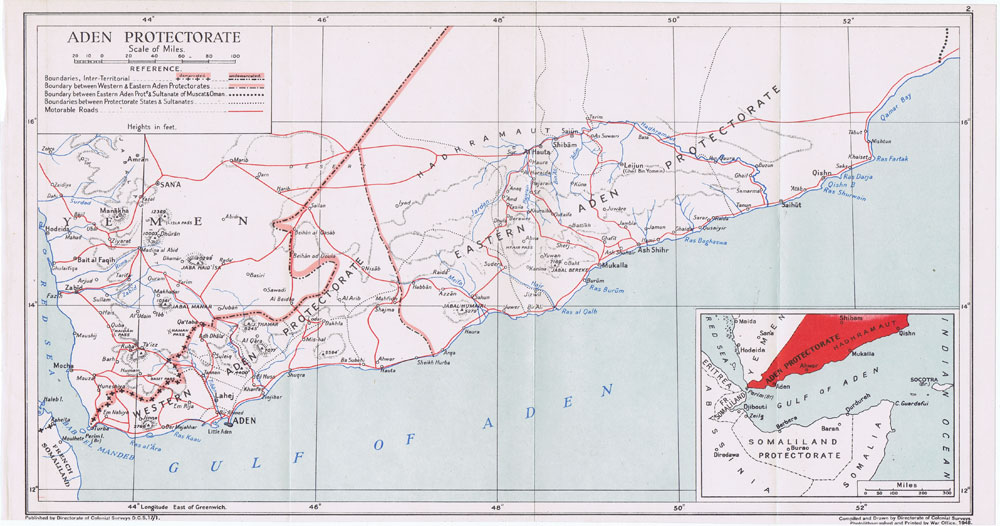
Official map of the Aden Protectorate, 1948.

Beginning with a formal treaty of protection with the Mahra Sultanate of Qishn and Socotra in 1886, the British began a slow formalisation of protection arrangements that included more than 30 major treaties of protection with the last signed only in 1954. These treaties, together with a number of other minor agreements, created the Aden Protectorate that extended well east of Aden to Hadhramaut and included all of the territory that would become South Yemen except for the immediate environs and port of the colonial capital, Aden.

Aden with its harbour was the only area in full British sovereignty and, together with some offshore islands, was known as Aden Settlement (1839–1932), Aden Province (1932–1937), the Colony of Aden (1937–1963) and finally State of Aden (1963–1967).

In exchange for British protection, the rulers of the constituent territories of the Protectorate agreed not to make treaties with or cede territory to any other foreign power. In 1917, control of Aden Protectorate was transferred from the Government of India, which had inherited the British East India Company's interests in various princely states on the strategically important naval route from Europe to India, to the British Foreign Office. For administrative purposes, the protectorate was divided into the Eastern Aden Protectorate (with its own Political Officer, a British advisor, stationed at Mukalla in Qu'aiti from 1937 to c. 1967) and the Western Aden Protectorate (with its own Political Officer, stationed at Lahej from 1 April 1937 to 1967), for some separation of administration.

In 1928, the British established Aden Command, directed by the Royal Air Force, to preserve the security of the Protectorate. It was renamed British Forces Aden in 1936 and was known later as British Forces Arabian Peninsula and then Middle East Command (Aden).

=== Polities ===
The boundaries between the polities and even their number fluctuated over time. Some such as the Mahra Sultanate barely had any functioning administration.

Not included in the protectorate were Aden Colony and the insular areas of Perim, Kamaran, and Khuriya Muriya that were administered by it.

==== Eastern Protectorate ====
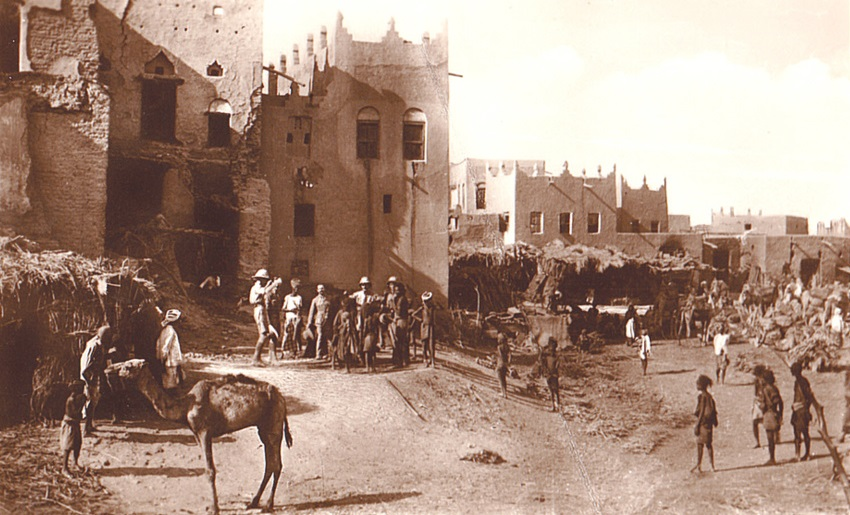
Lahej, Western Protectorate c. 1910

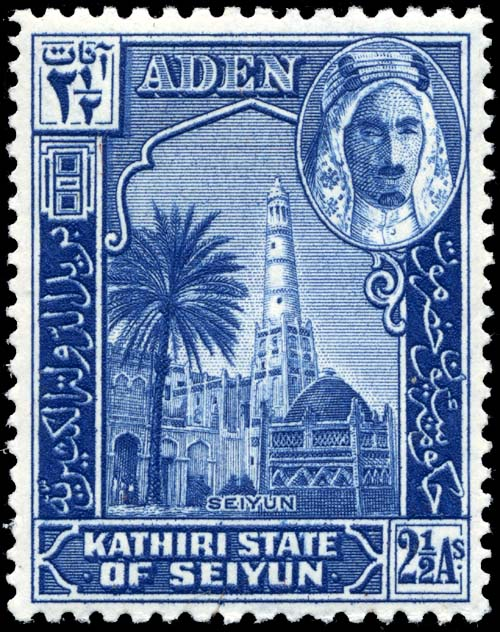
Postage stamp of the Kathiri state of Sai'yun with portrait of Sultan Jafar bin Mansur

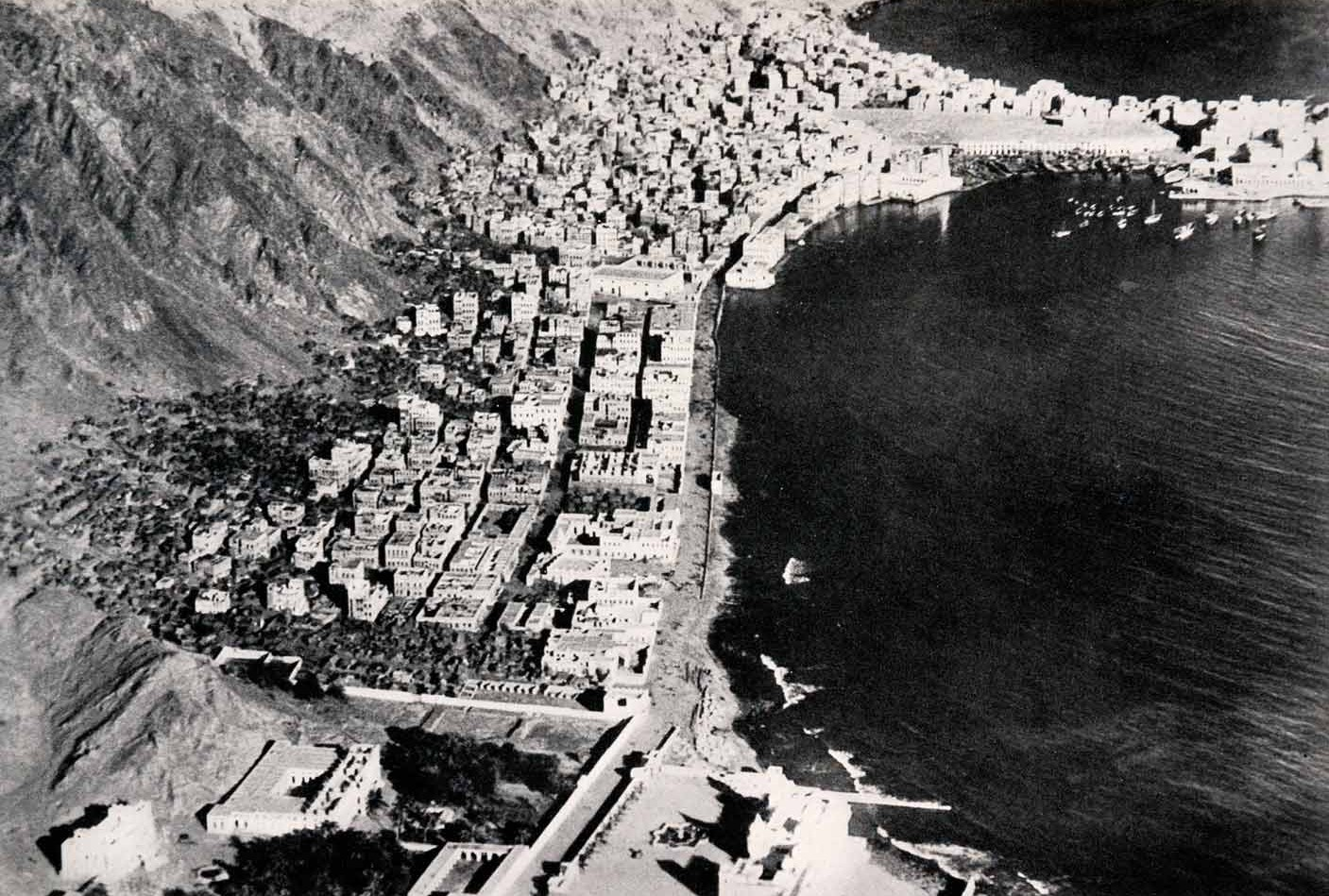
Aerial view of Mukalla, Eastern Protectorate, 1932

The Eastern Protectorate (c. 230,000 km^{2}) came to include the following entities (mostly in Hadhramaut):

- Kathiri
- Mahra
- Qu'aiti
- Wahidi Balhaf
- Wahidi Bir Ali
- Wahidi Haban

==== Western Protectorate ====
The Western Protectorate (c. 55,000 km^{2}) included:

- Alawi
- Aqrabi
- Audhali
- Beihan
- Dathina
- Dhala
  - Qutaibi Dependence of Dhala
- Fadhli
- Haushabi
- Lahej
- Lower Aulaqi
- Lower Yafa
- Shaib
- Upper Aulaqi Sheikhdom
- Upper Aulaqi Sultanate
- Upper Yafa Sultanate and the five Upper Yafa sheikhdoms of:
  - Al-Busi
  - Al-Dhubi
  - Hadrami
  - Maflahi
  - Mawsata

=== Advisory treaties ===
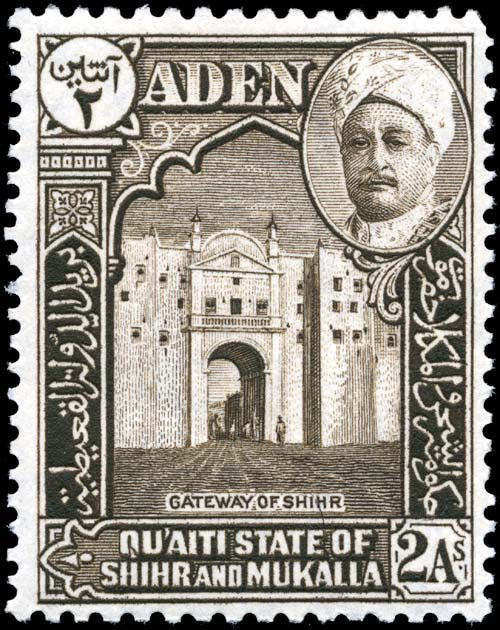
Postage stamp from the Qu'aiti state of Shihr and Mukalla with portrait of Sultan Salib bin Ghalib.

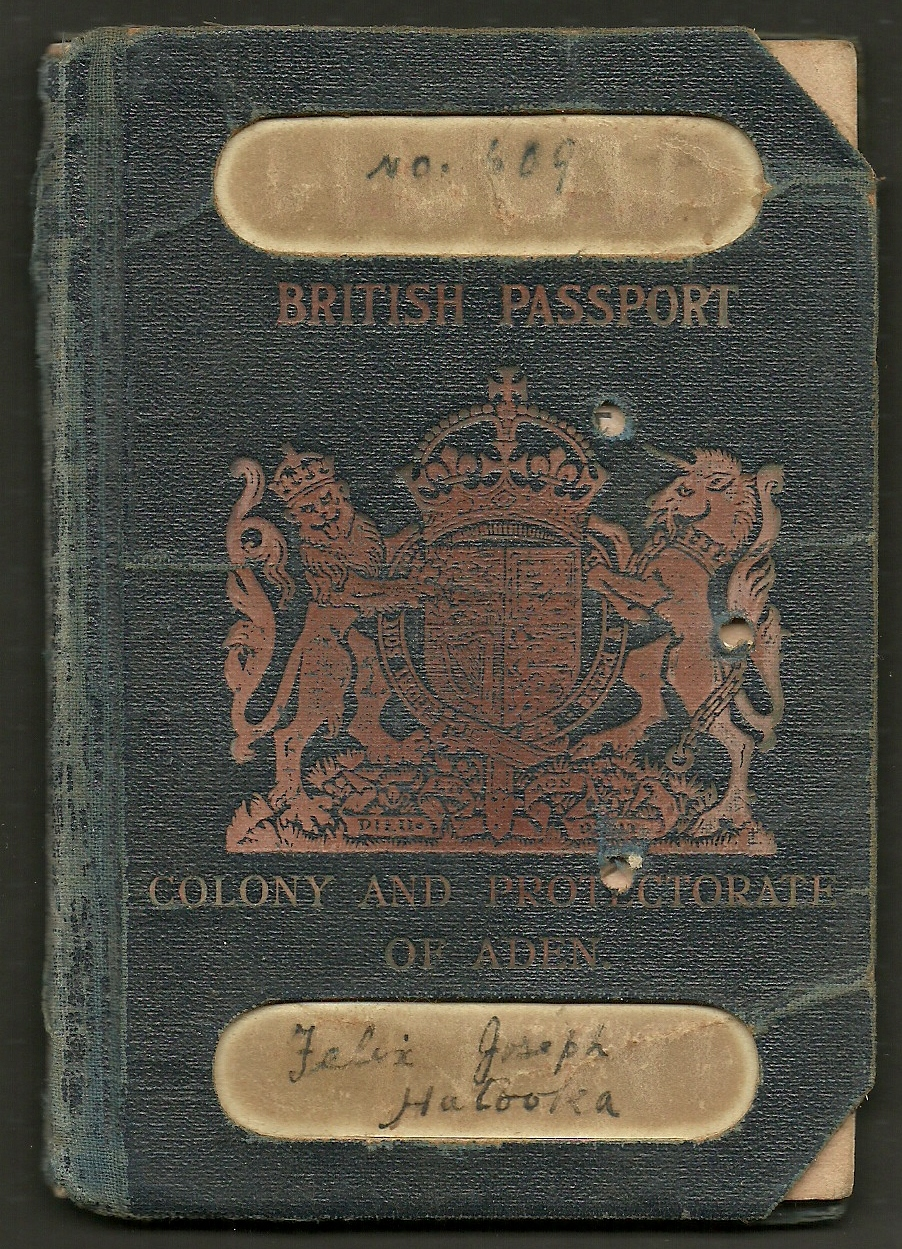
1940 cover of British controlled Aden protectorate passport.

In 1938, Britain signed an advisory treaty with the Qu'aiti sultan and, throughout the 1940s and 1950s, signed similar treaties with twelve other protectorate states. The following were the states with advisory treaties:

Eastern Protectorate States

- Kathiri
- Mahra
- Qu'aiti
- Wahidi Balhaf

Western Protectorate States

- Audhali
- Beihan
- Dhala
- Haushabi
- Fadhli
- Lahej
- Lower Aulaqi
- Lower Yafa
- Upper Aulaqi Sheikhdom

These agreements allowed for the stationing of a Resident Advisor in the signatory states which gave the British a greater degree of control of their domestic affairs. This rationalised and stabilised the rulers' status and laws of succession but had the effect of encouraging official corruption. Aerial bombardment and collective punishment were sometimes used against wayward tribes to enforce the rule of Britain's clients. British protection came to be considered by some to be an impediment to progress, especially by promoters of Arab nationalism as reinforced by news from the outside received by newly available transistor radios.

=== Challenges to the status quo ===
British control was also challenged by King Ahmad bin Yahya of the Mutawakkilite Kingdom of Yemen to the north who did not recognise British suzerainty in South Arabia and had ambitions of creating a unified Greater Yemen. During the late 1940s and the early 1950s, Yemen was involved with a series of border skirmishes along the disputed Violet Line, a 1914 Anglo-Ottoman demarcation that served to separate Yemen from the Aden Protectorate.

In 1950, Kennedy Trevaskis, the Advisor for the Western Protectorate developed a plan for the protectorate states to form two federations, corresponding to the two halves of the protectorate. Although little progress was made with the plan, it was considered a provocation by Ahmad bin Yahya. In addition to his role as king, he also served as the imam of the ruling Zaidi branch of Shi'a Islam. He feared that a successful federation in the Shafi'i Sunnite protectorates would serve to encourage discontented Shafi'ites who inhabited the coastal regions of Yemen. To counter the threat, Ahmad increased Yemeni efforts to decrease British control and, during the mid-1950s, Yemen assisted a number of revolts by disgruntled tribes against protectorate states. The appeal of Yemen was limited initially in the protectorate but a growing intimacy between Yemen and the popular Arab nationalist president of Egypt Gamal Abdel Nasser and the formation of United Arab States increased its attraction.

=== Federation and the end of the Protectorate ===
Aden had been of interest to Britain as a link to British India and then, after the loss of most of Britain's colonies from 1945 and the disastrous Suez Crisis in 1956, as a valuable port for accessing crucial Middle Eastern oil. It had also been chosen as the new location for Middle East Command.

Nationalist pressure prodded the threatened rulers of the Aden Protectorate states to revive efforts at forming a federation and, on 11 February 1959, six of them signed an accord forming the Federation of Arab Emirates of the South. During the next three years, they were joined by nine others and, on 18 January 1963, Aden Colony was merged with the federation creating the new Federation of South Arabia. At the same time, the (mostly eastern) states that had not joined the federation became the Protectorate of South Arabia, thus ending the existence of the Protectorate of Aden.

=== Aden Emergency ===
On 10 December 1963, a state of emergency was declared in the former protectorate and the newly created State of Aden.

The Emergency was caused largely by Arab nationalism spreading to the Arabian Peninsula, encouraged especially by the Socialist and pan-Arabist doctrines of the Egyptian president Gamel Abdel Nasser. The British, French, and Israeli invasion forces that had invaded Egypt after Nasser's nationalisation of the Suez Canal in 1956 had been forced to withdraw after intervention from both the United States and the USSR.

Nasser had only limited success in spreading his pan-Arabist doctrines through the Arab world, with his 1958 attempt to unify Egypt and Syria as the United Arab Republic ending in failure only 3 years later. An anti-colonial uprising in Aden in 1963 provided another potential opportunity for his doctrines, though it is not clear whether the revolt among the Arabs in Aden had the Yemeni guerrilla groups drawing inspiration from Nasser's pan-Arabist ideas or acting independently themselves.

By 1963 and during the ensuing years, anti-British guerrilla groups with varying political objectives began to coalesce into two larger, rival organisations: first the Egyptian-supported National Liberation Front (NLF) and then the Front for the Liberation of Occupied South Yemen (FLOSY), who attacked each other as well as the British.

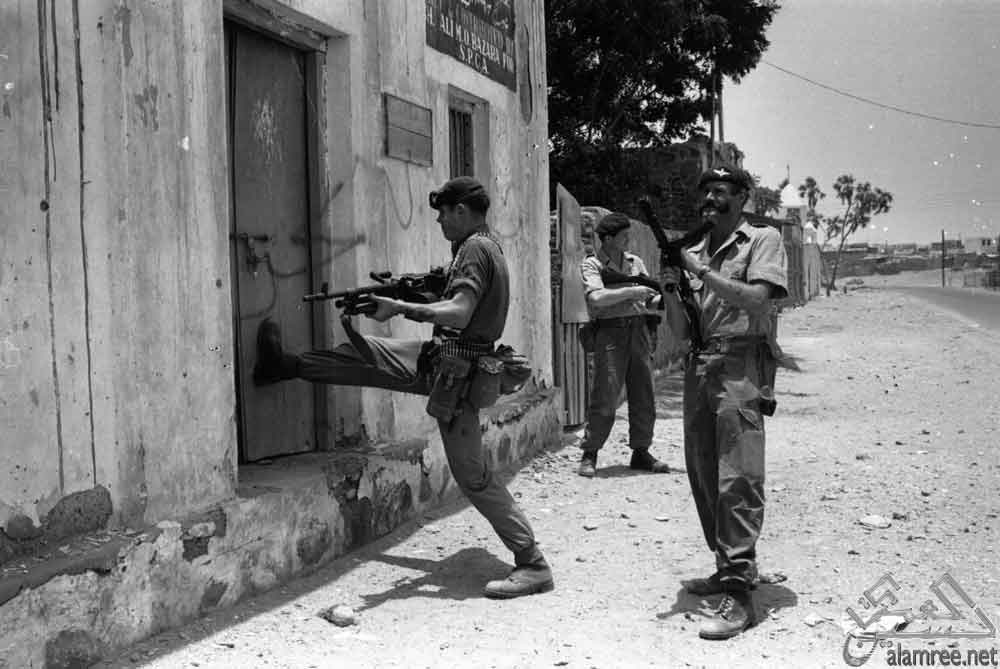
A scene in Aden in 1965.

By 1965, the RAF station (RAF Khormaksar) was operating nine squadrons. These included transport units with helicopters and a number of Hawker Hunter ground attack aircraft. They were called in by the army for strikes against positions using "60 lb" high explosive rockets and 30 mm Aden cannon.

The Battle of Crater brought Lt-Col Colin Campbell Mitchell (AKA "Mad Mitch") to prominence. On 20 June 1967 there was a mutiny in the Army of South Arabian Federation, which spread to the police. Order was restored by the British, due mainly to the efforts of the 1st Battalion Argyll and Sutherland Highlanders, commanded by Lt-Col Mitchell.

Nevertheless, deadly guerrilla attacks particularly by the NLF resumed soon against British forces, with the British leaving Aden by the end of November 1967, earlier than had been planned by British Prime Minister Harold Wilson and without an agreement for the succeeding governance. The NLF then seized power.
