= Sheikhdom of al-Hawra =

Coordinates: 13.817366°N 47.578196°E

Sheikhdom of al-Hawra (Note: Also transliterated as Haura.) المشيخة (من) الحوراء
- 19th century–1951
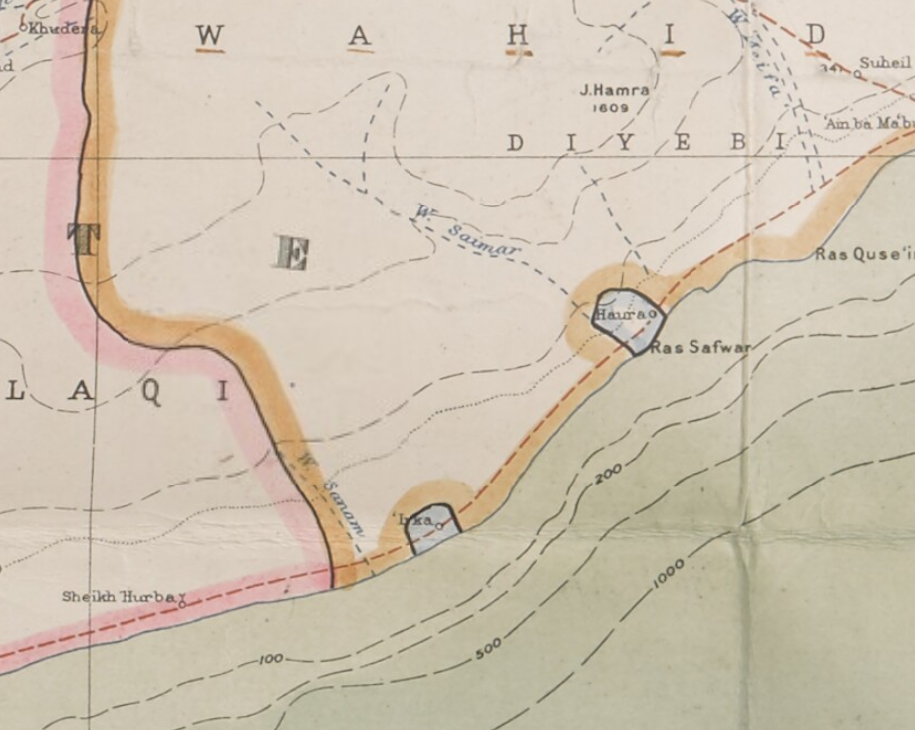
- Map of the Sheikhdoms of al-Hawra and al-ʽIrqa in 1926

- Al-Hawra within modern Yemen
- Capital: al-Hawra
- Religion: Islam
- Government: Sheikhdom
- Sheikh
  - 1858 – 1895: `Abd Allah ibn Muhammad Ba Shahid (first)
  - 1917 – 1951: Awad ibn Salih Ba Shahid (last)
- History
  - Established: 19th century
  - British protectorate: 1888
  - Disestablished: 1951

Area
- 1946: 41.6 km^{2} (16.1 sq mi)

Population
  - 1946: 300
- Today part of: Yemen

The Sheikhdom of al-Hawra (Arabic: المشيخة (من) الحوراء, romanized: al-Mashyakhat (min) al-Hawra) was a state of the Protectorate of South Arabia which existed from the 19th century to 1951. It became a British protectorate in 1888.

== History ==
=== Origins ===
The Sheikhdom of al-Hawra was established in the 19th century. The first known Sheikh of al-Hawra was Abd Allah ibn Muhammad Ba Shahid, who ruled from circa 1858 to 1895.

=== Theodore Bent's visit ===
Between 1893 and 1897, Theodore Bent, and his wife, Mabel Bent, undertook several expeditions into Southern Arabia. At one point, they visited the Sheikhdom of al-Hawra, where they described a large castle, belonging to the ruling Al Kaiti family, dominating a humble village. The castle, built out of sun-dried bricks, was seven stories high and covered roughly an acre (4 km^{2}) of land, and prominently featured battlements, towers, and machicolations. Theodore and Mabel were welcomed by the Sultan, who requested a gift, which was given in the form of 20 Indian rupees.

=== British protectorate ===
Starting in 1888, the British Empire paid an annual stipend to al-Hawra, and a Protectorate Treaty was concluded with them in that year. In May 1895 Shaikh Abdulla bin Muhammad ba Shahid, the representative Shaikh, died. He was succeeded by Shaikh Said bin Abdulla ba Shahid who abdicated in February 1896, being succeeded by his brother, Shaikh Ahmed bin Abdulla. The latter died in March 1900, and was succeeded by Shaikh Saleh bin Awadh.

A revised Protectorate Treaty was concluded with the latter in April 1902, when his stipend was increased from 50 to 180 dollars.

On 6 October 1917 Shaikh Salih bin Awadh died. He was succeeded by his son, Awadh bin Salih.

=== End of the Sheikhdom ===
In c. 1951, al-Hawra was incorporated into Wahidi Balhaf.

== Rulers ==
The rulers of al-Hawra bore the title Shaykh al-Hawra.

=== List of Sheikhs ===
1. `Abd Allah ibn Muhammad Ba Shahid, 1858? – 6 May 1895
2. Sa`if ibn `Abd Allah Ba Shahid, 1895 – February 1896
3. Ahmad ibn `Abd Allah Ba Shahid, February 1896 – 1 March 1900
4. Salih ibn `Awad Ba Shahid, March 1900 – 6 October 1917 (Interrupted in May 1904)
5. Awad ibn Salih Ba Shahid, October 1917 – 1951

== Demographics ==
In 1946, the Sheikhdom of al-Hawra had a population of 300.

== Geography ==
al-Hawra is a seaport about 12 miles from Irqa. A report in 1946 described al-Hawra as a "small fishing village".
