= Kathiri =

1395–1967 sultanate in modern-day Yemen

Kathiri State of Seiyun السلطنة الكثيرية (Arabic)
- 1395–1967
- Flag Coat of Arms

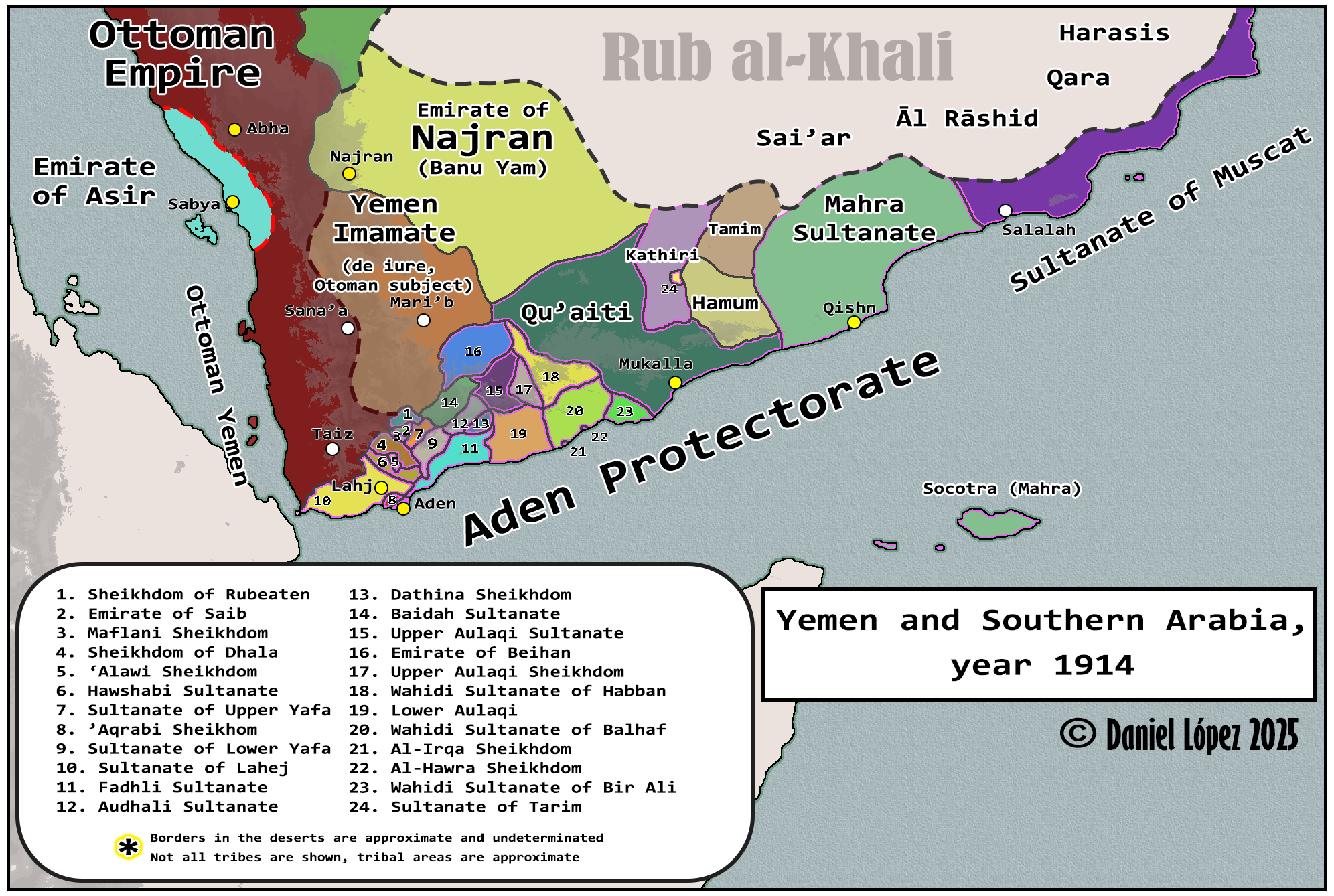
- Map of South Arabia in 1914
- Capital: Seiyun; 17°10′N 50°15′E
- Government: Sultanate
- HRH Sultan
  - 1395-c. 1430: Badr as-Sahab ibn al-Habrali Bu Tuwairik (first)
  - 1948–1967: al-Muhsin bin ‘Ali bin al-Mansur (last)
- Establishment: 1395
- Historical era: Middle Ages to Cold War
  - First Kathiri state established: 1395
  - Fall of the first Kathiri state: 1730
  - Second Kathiri state established: 1803
  - Fall of the second Kathiri state: 1858
  - Third Kathiri state established: 1840s
  - Informal protection treaty with the British signed: 1888
  - Aden Agreement: 1918
  - Incorporation into South Yemen: 30 November 1967
  - Established: 1395
  - Disestablished: 1967

Population
  - 1952: 60,000
Preceded by
Rasulid dynasty
Succeeded by
Quaiti Sultanate
South Yemen
Muscat and Oman
- Today part of: Yemen; Saudi Arabia; Oman

Kathiri, also known as the Kathiri sultanate (Arabic: السلطنة الكثيرية, romanized: al-Saltanah al-Kathīrīyah), and officially as the Kathiri State of Seiyun, was a sultanate in the Hadhramaut region of the southern Arabian Peninsula, in what is now part of Yemen and the Dhofar Governorate of Oman. It was established in 1379 and ruled Hadhramaut from Dhofar in the east to Sharura in the Empty Quarter in the north and Ain Bamabd in the south.

Throughout its history, the Kathiri state ruled a large area of Hadhramaut, but it lost much of its power in the 19th century in favor of its rival, the Qu'aiti, and lost its eastern regions to the Omani Empire and the Mahra Sultanate, eventually limiting the authority of the Kathiri state to northern Hadhramaut.

In 1414, Sultan Ali bin Omar bin Jaafar bin Badr al-Kathiri decided to seize Dhofar, which was supported by all Hadramawt scholars at that time, and seized it. In the mid-1950s, the Kathiri state was forced to join the British Protectorate of South Arabia, and remained in it until 1967, when the 14 October Revolution took place, expelling the colonizers and unifying the rest of the sultanates into one state, the People's Republic of South Yemen.

== History ==
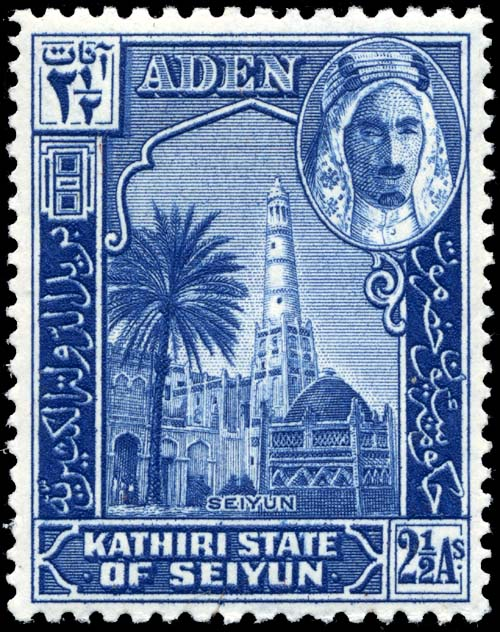
A postage stamp of 1942 depicts the sultan and the capital city

The Kathiri state was established in 1395 by Badr as-Sahab ibn al-Habrali Bu Tuwairik, who ruled until c. 1430. The Kathiri conquered Ash-Shihr in the 1460s.

The country inhabited by this tribe was formerly extensive, reaching from the Aulaqi districts on the west to the Maliri tribe on the east, and including the seaports of Mukalla and Shihr. Civil wars led to the interference of the Yafai, and much of the Kathiri territory came under the sway of the Kasadi and Qu'aiti.

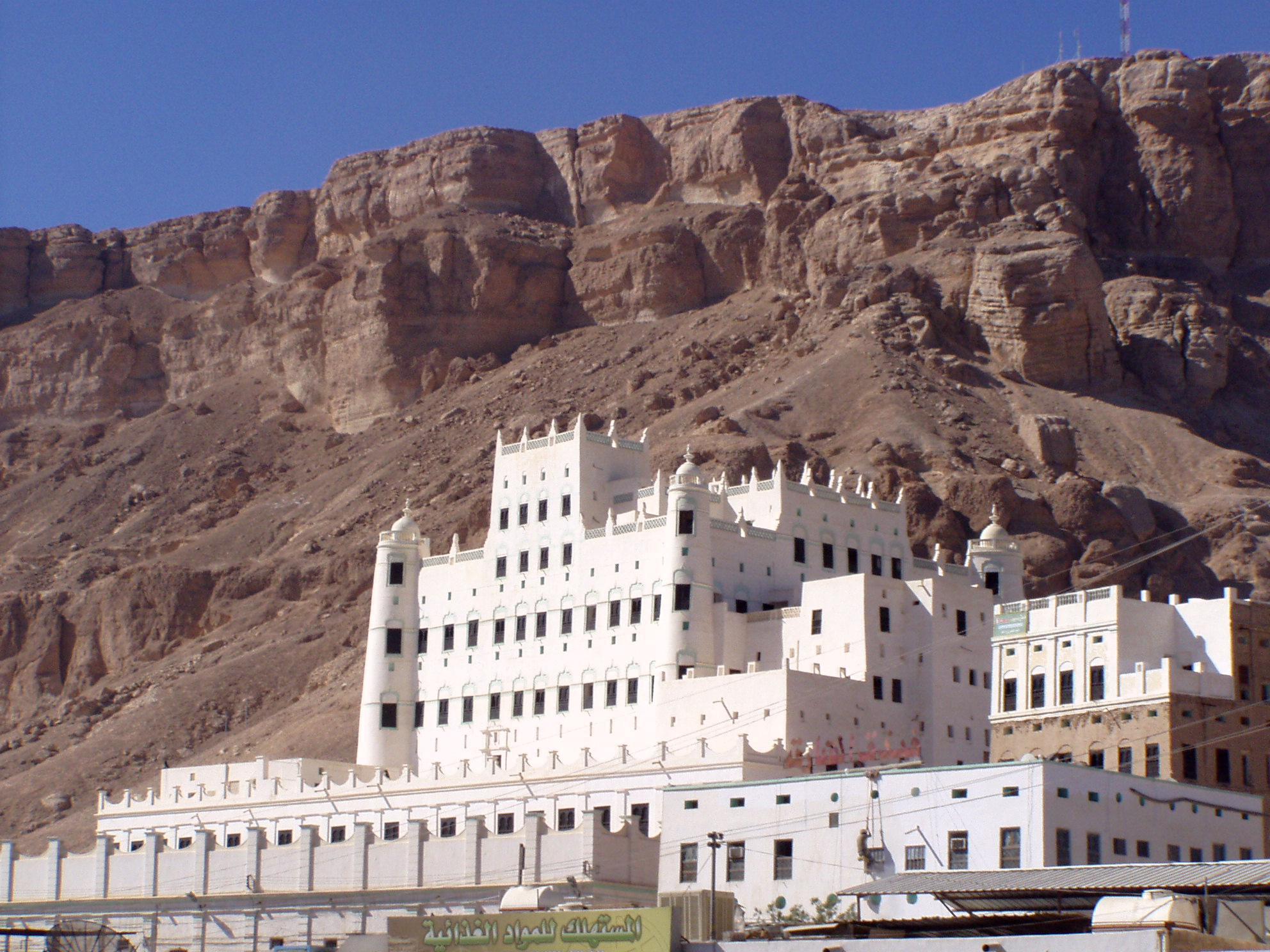
Sultan Al Kathiri Palace

The Kathiris were eventually restricted to a small inland portion of Hadhramaut with their capital at Seiyun (Say'un), where the Seiyun Palace was located.

At the end of 1883, Sultan Abdulla bin Salih, one of the Kathiri Shaikhs, visited the Resident at Aden. His principal object was to ascertain what attitude the British Government would maintain in the event of the Kathiri attacking the Qu'aiti with a view to repossessing themselves of the ports of Shihr and Mukalla. Abdulla bin Salih also visited Zanzibar with intent to intrigue with the ex-Naqib of Mukalla, from whom however, he failed to obtain any material assistance.

The Government of India in March 1884 directed that the Kathiri be warned that an attack upon Shihr and Mukalla would be viewed with grave displeasure, and that, if necessary, a gun-boat would be sent to support the Qu'aiti ruler. The Jamadar of Shihr and Mukalla was subsequently assured in the most public manner that the Government would support him in the event of any attack on his ports.

In 1895, the Kathiri captured the port at Dhufar, driving out the Governor, who retired to Mirbat. In 1897 the port was recaptured. In 1918, a long standing Qu'aiti-Kathiri quarrel was settled, with the assistance of the Aden Residency, by the conclusion of an agreement between the parties, by which the Kathiri agreed to accept as binding upon them the treaty of 1888 between the Qu'aiti and the British Government and also accepted the arbitration of the British Government in the settlement of future disputes.

Sultan Mansur bin Ghalib died at Mecca in May 1929 and was succeeded by his son Ali bin Mansur.

The Kathiri State declined to join the Federation of South Arabia, but remained under British protection as part of the Protectorate of South Arabia. By the end of the Sultanate's existence, its two principal cities of Say'un and Tarim were almost entirely financially dependent on Kathiri holdings in Jakarta and Singapore. Al-Husayn ibn Ali, Kathiri sultan since 1949, was overthrown in October 1967, and the following month the former sultanate became part of newly independent South Yemen.

The first prime minister in the history of East Timor, Mar'ī al-Kathīrī, is a third generation descendant of immigrants from Kathiri, part of a significant migration of Hadhramis to Southeast Asia in the 19th and 20th centuries. This is reflected in his name 'Alkatiri'. The Indonesian human rights activist Munir Said Thalib is also a descendant of immigrants from the Kathiris.

== Demographics ==
=== Social Stratification ===
A system of social stratification defined Kathiri society. Membership in these groups was acquired at birth and dictated a person's marriage prospects, occupation, and political role. The structure is generally divided into four major categories:

- Sada (Sayyids): At the top of the social hierarchy, they claim direct descent from Muhammad. Historically, they were an unarmed scholarly elite who held a monopoly on formal education and served as religious advisers and mediators in tribal disputes.
- Mashayikh: Families of religious renown and scholars who, while not claiming Prophetic descent, held high social prestige based on religious scholarship and ancestral descent from holy men.
- Qaba‘il (Tribesmen): Armed groups who claimed descent from Qahtan and held a monopoly on force. Their identity was tied to the ownership and defense of tribal land.
- Masakin or Hadhar: Unarmed town-dwellers, merchants, and craftsmen who lacked a distinguished pedigree. This group included a diverse range of economic statuses, from wealthy trading families to manual laborers.

==== Lower Social Strata and Labor Groups ====
Beneath the primary tiers resided several groups categorized as "weak" (dhu‘afa’) because they did not bear arms:

- Harthan: A cultivating class of farmers and sharecroppers. In some areas, the term fallah was used as a derogatory epithet for individuals of lower social status who were involved in agriculture.
- Abid (Slaves): A distinct group of African origin. While socially stigmatized, many served in the hashiya (regular military forces) of the Sultanate and could rise to high administrative ranks as governors or magistrates.
- Akhdam and Subiyan: Groups involved in menial tasks and ceremonial services (weddings, funerals, etc.). The Subiyan were often believed to be of Ethiopian origin and acted as permanent clients to specific tribal families.

=== Religion ===
The inhabitants were almost exclusively Sunni Muslims adhering to the Shafi'i school of law. Religious life was heavily influenced by Sufism, particularly the Ba 'Alawi tradition, which centered on the veneration of saints and ritual visits (ziyara) to tombs, such as that of the Prophet Hud in Qabr Hud.

=== Language ===
Arabic was the primary language; however, due to extensive migration, Malay was frequently the court language in Seiyun and the common tongue among the educated classes.

== List of sultans ==
Sultan's name	Reign
Ghalib bin Muhsin bin Ahmad	1865–1870
al-Mansur bin Ghalib bin Muhsin	1870–1929
‘Ali bin al-Mansur bin Ghalib	1929–1938
Ja‘far bin al-Mansur bin Ghalib	1938–1948
al-Muhsin bin ‘Ali bin al-Mansur	1948–1967
