= Mawsata =

State in the British Aden Protectorate

Coordinates: 14°26′N 44°16′E

State of Mawsata دولة الموسطة
- State of the Protectorate of South Arabia
- 1780–1967
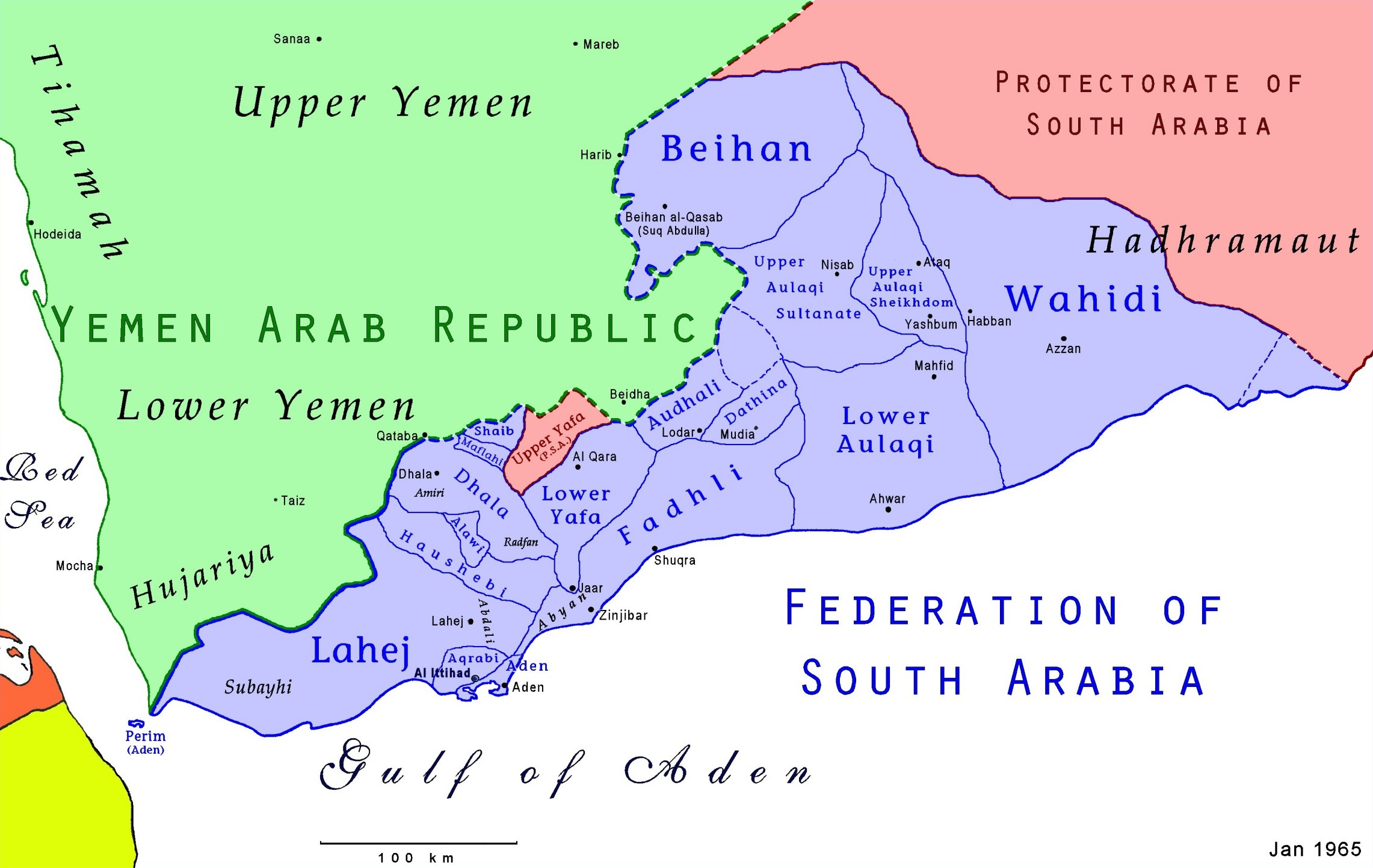
- Map of the Federation of South Arabia
  - Type: Sheikhdom
- Historical era: 20th century
  - Established: 1780
  - Disestablished: 1967
Preceded by	Succeeded by
Federation of Arab Emirates of the South	South Yemen

Mawsata, Mausata (Arabic: الموسطة), or the Mawsata State (Arabic: دولة الموسطة Dawlat Mawsaṭah), was a state in the British Aden Protectorate. Mawsata was located in the western and southwestern part of Upper Yafa. The main mountain in the area is Jabal Darfan.

Mawsata was the most populated of the five sheikhdoms of Upper Yafa. The last ruler was deposed in 1967 upon the founding of the People's Republic of South Yemen and the area is now part of the Republic of Yemen.

== History ==
The State of Mawsata (Dawlat Mawsata) was established in 1780. Owing to family dissensions, in 1860 the ruling family was divided into two lineages. Around 1904 the state became a British protectorate.

Mawsata was part of the Protectorate of South Arabia until 1967 when it was abolished.

=== Rulers ===
The ruler of Mawsata State bore the title Naqib.

- 1780 - 1810 al-Qasim Al Harhara
- 1810 - 1840 `Ali ibn al-Qasim Al Harhara
- 1840 - 1860 `Askar ibn `Ali Al Harhara

==== Lineage 1 ====
- 1860 - 1907 `Ali ibn `Askar Al Harhara
- 1907 - 1940 Naji ibn `Ali ibn `Askar Al Harhara
- 1940 - Jan 1963 Ahmad ibn Abi Bakr ibn `Ali Al Harhara
- Feb 1963 - Jun 1967 `Aydarus ibn Ahmad Al Harhara

==== Lineage 2 ====
- 1860 - 1920 Muhsin ibn `Askar Al Harhara
- 1920 - 1946 Muhammad ibn Muhsin ibn `Askar Al Harhara
- 1946 - 1959 al-Husayn ibn Salih ibn Muhsin Al Harhara
- 1959 - Jun 1967 Salih ibn al-Husayn ibn Salih Al Harhara

== See also ==
- Aden Protectorate
- Upper Yafa
