= Qutaibi =

Qutaibi Sheikhdom قطيبي
- Government: Sheikhdom
- Today part of: Republic of Yemen

Qutaibi (Arabic: قطيبي Quṭaybī) or the Qutaibi Sheikhdom (Arabic: مشيخة القطيبي Mashyakhat al-Quṭaybī) was a polity in the western Aden Protectorate, a dependency of the Emirate of Dhala and now part of the Republic of Yemen. In 1964, during the Aden Emergency, its tribesmen attacked British Empire troops in the Radfan Hills area and became known as the "Red Wolves" for their combat ferocity.
