= Upper Yafa =

Former state in the British Aden Protectorate

Coordinates: 13°49′51″N 45°15′20″E

State of Upper Yafa يافع العليا Yāfi‘ al-‘Ulyā
- State of the Protectorate of South Arabia
- 1680–1967
- Flag Emblem

- Upper Yafa in its region

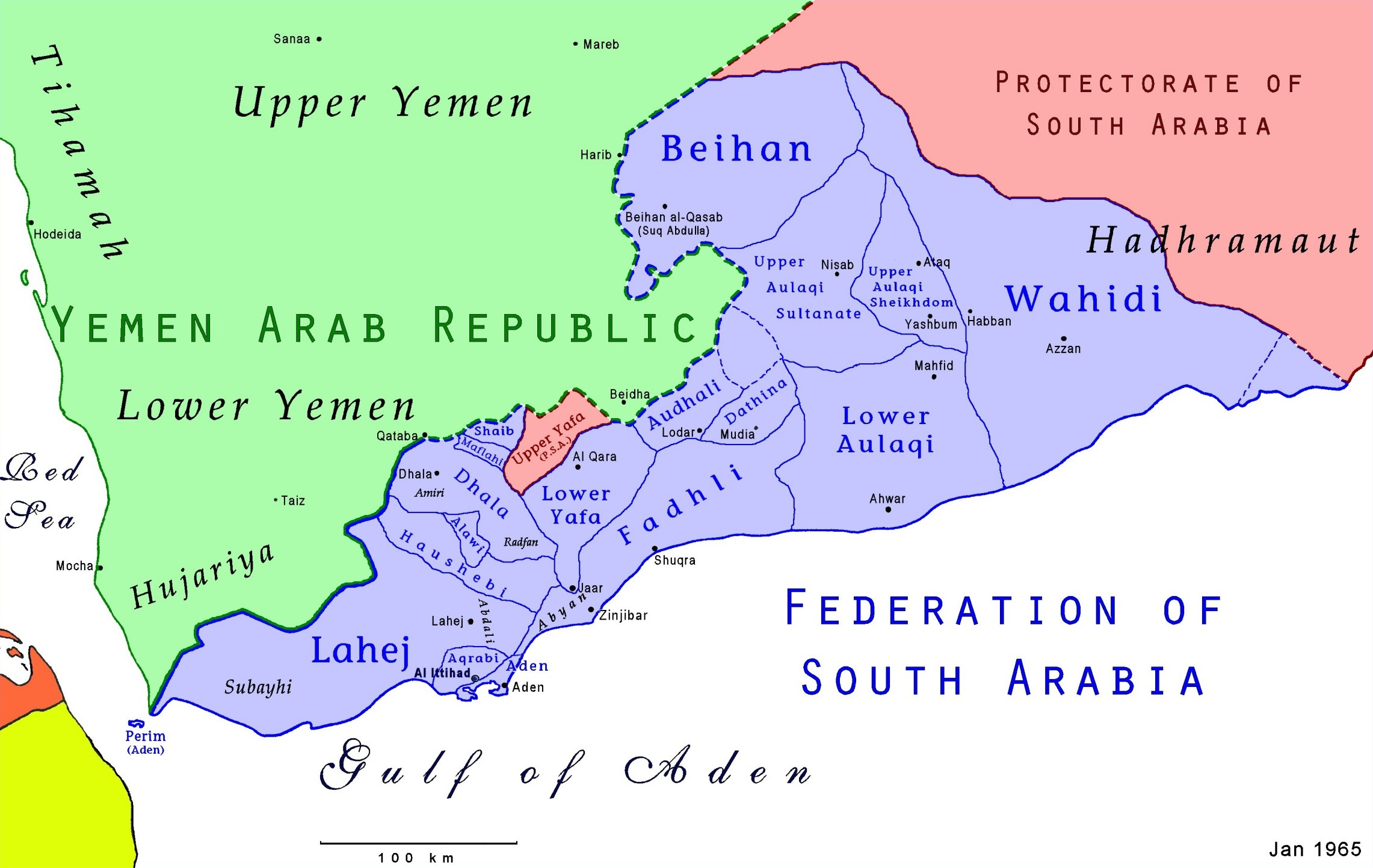
- Upper Yafa is the western exclave of the Protectorate of South Arabia (red) between the Federation of South Arabia (blue) and the Yemen Arab Republic (green) in this map of the region in the 1960s
- Capital: Mahjaba
- Area
  - 1967 est.: 1,600 km^{2} (620 sq mi)
- Population
  - 1967 est.: 35,000
- Government
  - Type: Confederal Sultanate
  - Motto: إِنَّ اللَّهَ يَأمُرُ بِالعَدلِ وَالإِحسَانِ 'Inn Alllah yamur bialeadl wal'iihsan "Indeed, Allah commands justice and grace"
- Historical era: 20th century
  - Established: 1680
  - Disestablished: 29 November 1967
Succeeded by
South Yemen

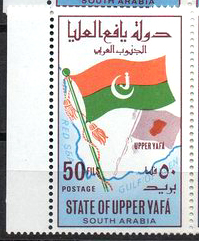
Upper Yafa stamp

Upper Yafa (Arabic: يافع العليا Yāfi‘ al-‘Ulyā), officially the State of Upper Yafa (Arabic: دولة يافع العليا Daulat Yāfiʿ al-ʿUlyā), was a military alliance in the British Aden Protectorate and the Protectorate of South Arabia. It was ruled by the Harharah dynasty and its capital was Mahjaba, a small town on a hill located about 50km northeast of Habilayn. Upper Yafa was one part of Yafa'a, the other part being Lower Yafa.

The sultan of Upper Yafa had very little control over Upper Yafa's constituent sheikdoms, which had separate protectorate treaties with the British, and were free to disassociate from the policies of the Upper Yafa sheikh. The only time that the Upper Yafa sheikh held influence was during a crisis that threatened the independence of Upper Yafa's states, during which they would unite under the sultan. This meant that Upper Yafa was more akin to a military alliance than a genuine state.

== History ==
The Yafa'i tribe has traditionally inhabited the mountainous hinterland of the Aden area. Upper Yafa was formed in the 18th century. It included the sheikhdoms of Al-Busi, Al-Dhubi, Al-Hadrami, Al-Muflihi, Al-Mausata, Na'wah and Rubeitein. In 1895 Sultan Qahtan bin Umar succeeded to the titular chieftainship on the death of Sultan Muhammad bin Ali. Very few dealings were held with the Upper Yafai till 1903, when in that year it was proposed to demarcate the north-eastern frontier. Treaties were concluded with the Dhubi, Mausatta and Muflahi sections, with Sultan Qahtan as titular chief of the whole tribe, and with the Hadrami and Shaibi sections. In August the Shaibi frontier was demarcated, but, on the survey party entering the Rubiatein district, a post which had been established at Awabil was attacked by Sultan Salih bin Umar, Sultan Qahtan's brother. The attack was repelled but as the Turks declared that any advance into the Rada district would imperil the negotiations then proceeding between the two countries, all attempts to demarcate the north-eastern frontier were abandoned. In October 1903 an Agreement was made by Shaikh Mutahir Ali of the Shaibi tribe, by which he undertook to look after the boundary pillars for a monthly stipend of 7 dollars.

In 1904 owing to the agreement entered into with the British Government, Sultan Qahtan bin Umar was deposed by tribesmen headed by his brother, Salih. In 1905 Government sanctioned the gift to Sultan Qahtan of $3,000 as assistance towards effecting his rehabilitation.

The Shaibi tribesmen have their headmen of clans, who owe a sort of allegiance to a stipendiary by name Shaikh Ali Mana, the Saqladi. The Nuqaba of Mausatta, two of whom share the stipend granted to them by His Majesty's Government under the terms of their Treaty, assert that they have considerable influence in Shaibi; and Shaikh Ali Muhsin Askar, the son of Muhsin Askar (one Mausatta stipendiary), frequently visited the country as mediator. In recognition of his importance, Ali Muhsin Askar was granted an allowance of $20 a month, so long as he remained faithful to Government. In 1906 Ali Muhsin Askar, owing to a fancied slight which he asserted that he had received in Aden, returned to the Shaibi country and knock- ed down a boundary pillar. His allowance was stopped till he came into Dhala before the Resident and asked for pardon.

In 1913 Sultan Qahtan died, without having succeeded in getting himself reinstated. He was succeeded by his son, Sultan Umar, but his recognition was withheld by Government who gave him one year's time within which to bring about his rehabilitation, and continued to him provisionally the stipend paid to his father. The period was extended from year to year till 1919, when he abdicated in favour of his uncle Salih. The latter had been accepted by the Muflahi section as their Sultan in 1911, and in 1920 he was recognized by His Majesty's Government and was granted the stipend previously paid to Sultan Umar.

In November 1919 the Imam of Sanaa's troops captured Shaib', Rubiatein, Nawa and Dhabiani. They were compelled to evacuate Shuib in July 1928 but still occupied the other three Yafai sections.

Previous flag of Upper Yafa

In 1923, with a view to checking the advance of the troops of the Imam of Sanaa, Khan Bahadur Sayyid Husein bin Hamid el Mehdar, the Minister of the Sultan of Shir and Mukalla, paid a special visit, to Upper Yafa, with the approval of the Resident, and obtained the signatures of the Yafai sheikhs to an agreement by which they declared themselves bound by their existing treaties with Great Britain and pledged themselves to tribal unity and combination against any aggressors. This agreement contributed to the successful co-operation of the Upper Yafai tribes in the expulsion of the Imam's forces from Shaibi territory in July 1928.

Sultan Salih bin Umar abdicated in 1927 in favour of his son, Sultan Muhammad bin Salih, who was accorded recognition by the British government.

In 1931, the numbers of the Upper Yafai tribesmen were estimated very approximately at 80,000. The area of Upper Yafa had not been visited by Europeans before Colonel M.C. Lake of the British Indian Army explored it to gather intelligence and to find suitable sites for landing grounds. In 1925 Lake built a small army of tribal warriors that would be able to assist the British Aden Protectorate in eventual territorial scuffles with the Imam of Yemen.

Between 1955 and 1957 there were uprisings against the British authorities in Upper Yafa that were successfully suppressed. In 1959, several tribal leaders with assistance of the Mutawakkilite Kingdom of Yemen rose up against the Upper Yafa sultan. The rebellion was suppressed following bombardment by the Royal Air Force on 15, 16, and 18 June, at the request of the sultan. There were no casualties from the rebellion and they became known as the Upper Yafa disturbances.

Unlike Lower Yafa, in the 1960s Upper Yafa did not join the British-sponsored Federation of South Arabia, forming instead an exclave part of the Protectorate of South Arabia. The Upper Yafa Sultanate was abolished in 1967 upon the founding of the People's Republic of South Yemen. South Yemen united with North Yemen in 1990 to form the Republic of Yemen.

== States ==
- Al-Busi
- Al-Dhubi
- Hadrami
- Mawsata
- Maflahi
- Na'wah
- Rubeaten
- Juban

== Rulers ==
=== Sheikhs of Upper Yafa ===
- c.1730 – 1735: `Ali ibn Ahmad Al Harhara
- c.1735 – 1750: Ahmad ibn `Ali Al Harhara
- c.1750 – 1780: Salih I ibn Ahmad Al Harhara
- c.1780 – 1800: `Umar I ibn Salih Al Harhara

=== Sultans of Upper Yafa ===
- c.1800 – 1810: Qahtan I ibn `Umar ibn Salih Al Harhara (1st time)
- c.1810 – 1815: `Umar II ibn Qahtan ibn `Umar Al Harhara
- c.1815 – 1840: Qahtan I ibn `Umar ibn Qahtan Al Harhara (2nd time)
- c.1840 – 1866: `Abd Allah ibn Nasir ibn Salih Al Harhara
- 1866 – 1875: al-Husayn ibn Abi Bakr ibn Qahtan Al Harhara
- 1875 – 28 Apr 1895: Muhammad I ibn `Ali ibn Salih ibn Ahmad Al Harhara
- 1895 – 1903: Qahtan II ibn `Umar ibn al-Husayn Al Harhara
- 4 Dec 1903 – 1913: Salih II ibn `Umar ibn al-Husayn Al Harhara (1st time)
- 1913 – 1919: `Umar III ibn Qahtan ibn `Umar Al Harhara
- 1919 – 1927: Salih II ibn `Umar ibn al-Husayn Al Harhara (2nd time)
- 1927 – 1948: Umar IV ibn Salih ibn `Umar Al Harhara
- 1948 – 29 Nov 1967: Muhammad II ibn Salih ibn `Umar Al Harhara

== Postage stamps ==
The Sultanate of Upper Yafa issued stamps in September 1967 although Mahjaba did not have functioning postal services at that time.

Artistamp artist Bruce Grenville has created a set of stamps for the Sultanate of Upper Yafa.

Many further stamps were issued, not by the official authority, even after the dissolution of the Federation and the establishment of the People's Republic of Southern Yemen. These stamps can be found in the Phillips CD Catalogue of Oman State, Dhufar and South Arabia (Volume 15)

== See also ==
- List of Sunni dynasties
- Lower Yafa
- Protectorate of South Arabia
