= Dathina =

Coordinates: 13°56′N 46°05′E

Dathina Sheikhdom مشيخة دثينة
- State of the Federation of South Arabia
- 18th century–1967
- Flag

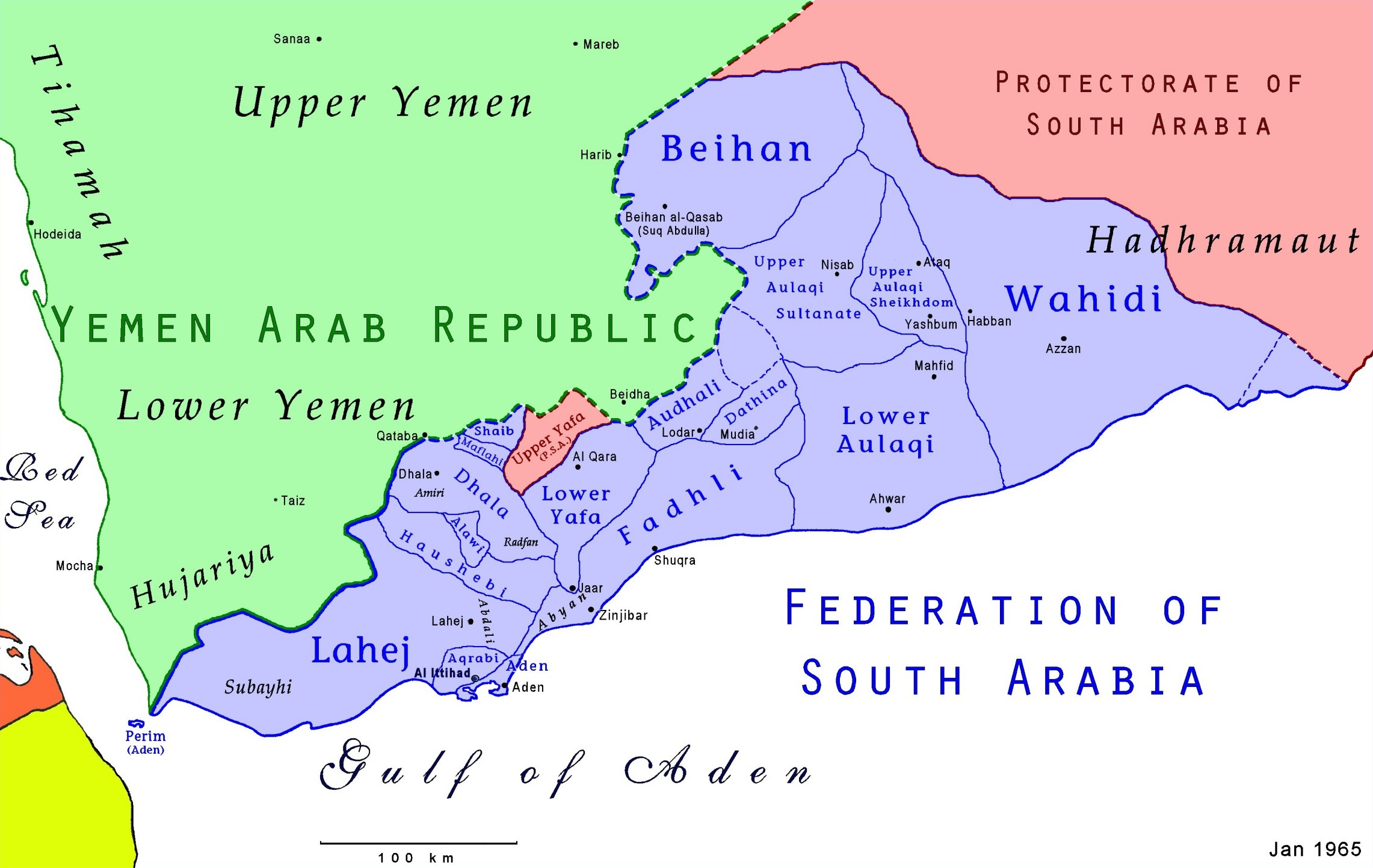
- Map of the Federation of South Arabia
- Capital: Mudiyah
  - Type: Sheikhdom
- Historical era: 20th century
  - Established: 18th century
  - Disestablished: 1967
Preceded by	Succeeded by
Federation of Arab Emirates of the South	South Yemen

Dathina (Arabic: دثينة Dathīnah), the Dathina Sheikhdom (Arabic: مشيخة دثينة Mashyakhat Dathīnah), or sometimes the Dathina Confederation, was a state in the British Aden Protectorate, the Federation of Arab Emirates of the South, and its successor, the Federation of South Arabia. Its capital was Mudiyah.

== History ==
The state was abolished on 14 August 1967 upon the founding of the People's Republic of Yemen. In 1990 it became part of the Republic of Yemen.

=== Rulers ===
Dathina was ruled for one-year terms by Chairmen of the Council of State who bore the title Na'ib, Ra'is Majlis al-Dawla.

- 1965 - 6? Apr 1966? al-Husayn ibn Mansur al-Jabiri
- 1966 - 14 Aug 1967 `Abd al-Qadir ibn Shaya

== See also ==
- Aden Protectorate
