= Lower Yafa =

Former state

Coordinates: 13°13′0″N 45°18′0″E

Sultanate of Lower Yafa Arabic: يافع السفلى Yāfi‘ as-Suflá
- State of the Federation of South Arabia
- 1681–1967
- Flag

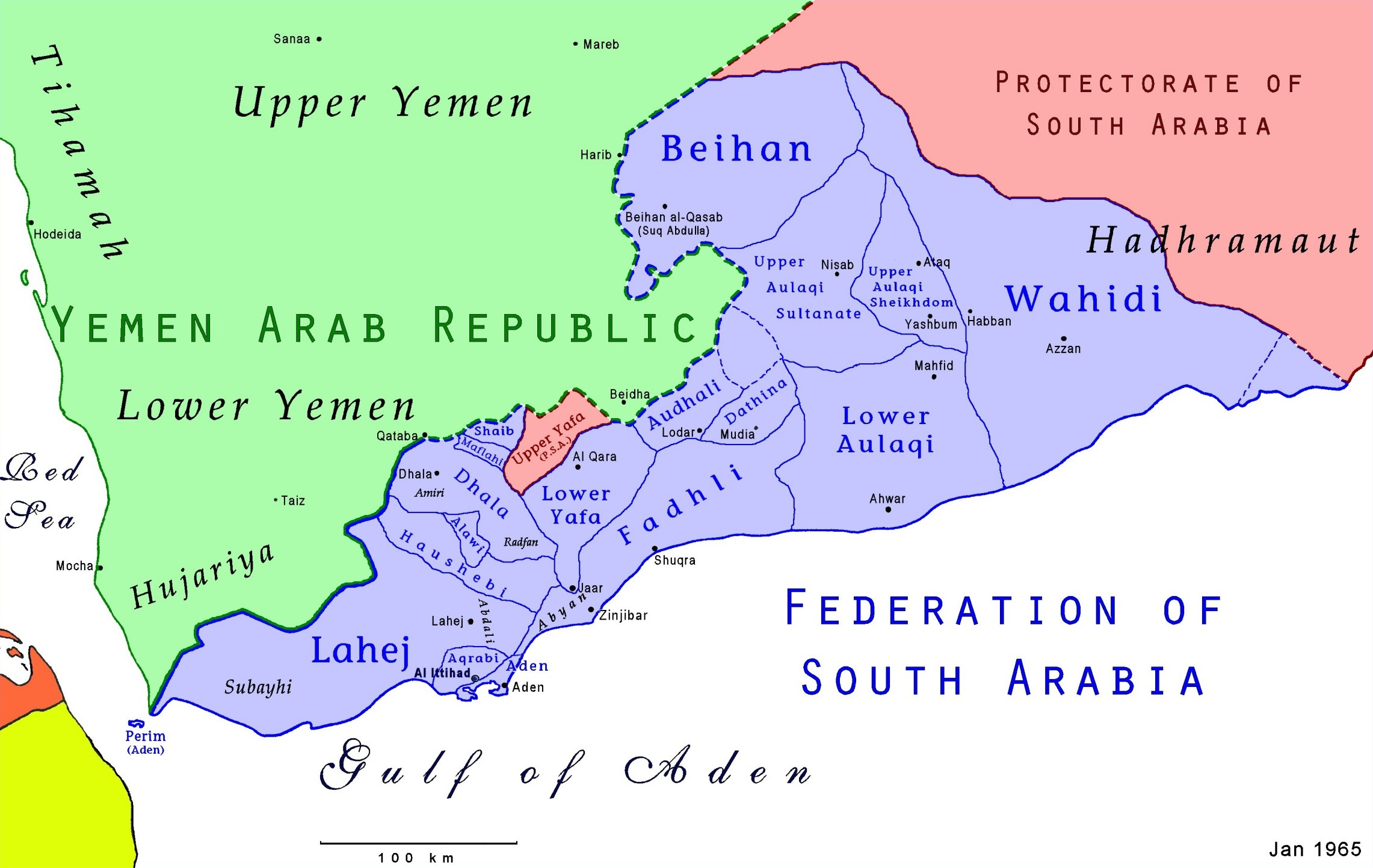
- Map of the Federation of South Arabia
- Capital: Jaʿār
- Government
  - Type: Sultanate
- Historical era: 20th century
  - Established: 1681
  - Disestablished: 1967
Succeeded by
South Yemen

Lower Yafa (Arabic: يافع السفلى Yāfi‘ as-Suflá), or the Sultanate of Lower Yafa (Arabic: سلطنة يافع السفلى Salṭanat Yāfi‘ as-Suflá), was a sultanate in the British Aden Protectorate ruled by the Al Afifi dynasty. Its capital was at Jaar. Lower Yafa was one part of Yafa'a, the other part being Upper Yafa. It is now part of the Republic of Yemen.

== History ==
Soon after the British capture of Aden an engagement was entered into in 1839 with Ali bin Ghalib, Sultan of the Lower Yafai, similar to that concluded with the Abdali and Fadhli Sultans. It would be loyally adhered to.

Sultan Ali bin Ghalib died in 1841 at a great age, and was succeeded by his son, Ahmed bin Ali. He died in September 1873, and was succeeded by his son, Ali bin Ahmed, who was succeeded by his brother, Muhsin bin Ahmed, in May 1885. The latter died in July 1891, and his nephew, Sultan Ahmed bin Ali, was elected as his successor. The Government of India sanctioned the continuance to him, with effect from 20 July 1891, of the annual stipend of 250 dollars enjoyed by the late Sultan.

In 1873 hostilities broke out between the Yafai and the Fadhli, in consequence of the Yafai Sultan having repudiated an engagement, concluded on his behalf by his son and in the presence of the Resident at Aden, whereby he had consented to accept from the Fadhli Sultan a royalty of 25 dollars a year for the use of water for irrigation. For this breach of faith the stipend of the Yafai Sultan was temporarily withheld.

From 1888 to 1893 desultory strife, interrupted by short truces, was carried on with the Fadhli over the water-supply from the Naza channel. In 1893 a truce was made and was kept for several years.

In 1893 Sultan Ahmed bin Ali visited Aden on his way to Mecca, where he died on 27 June. He was succeeded by Sultan Bubakar bin Seif.

On 1 August 1895 a Protectorate Treaty was concluded between the British and the Lower Yafai.

In 1899 Sultan Bubakar bin Seif died. He was succeeded by Sultan Abdulla bin Muhsin.

In 1902 the Fadhli Sultan established a new customs post at Zanzibar and levied dues on Yafai qafilahs. The Yafai retaliated by cutting off the water-supply from the Naza channel. The Fadhli then attacked Al Husn and Ar Rawa. In 1903 the Resident endeavored to effect a settlement, but the Yafai Sultan refused to attend the conference. In 1904 the Fadhli attacked Ar Rawa and Khanfar, taking possession of the latter and for a time no settlement was reached; while relations with the Lower Yafai Sultan continued strained, partly owing to his dissatisfaction with the position accorded to certain sections of the Upper Yafai, over whom he was inclined to assert a claim to general suzerainty, and partly to his dissatisfaction with the rank and precedence assigned to himself.

In 1916 Sultan Abdulla bin Muhsin died. He was succeeded by his cousin, Sultan Muhsin bin Ali, who renewed friendly relations with the Aden Residency, to which he paid periodical visits.

In 1925 Sultan Muhsin bin Ali died and was succeeded by his son, Sultan Aidrus bin Mubsin bin Ali. This Sultan has established his personal authority over the whole of the Lower Yafai clans.

In June 1926 a truce of four years was concluded between the Lower Yafai and Fadhli Sultans.

In June 1929 the Sultan of Lahej settled this long-standing feud and restored Khanfar to the Lower Yafai.

In November 1925 Major M. C. Lake was sent on a special Mission to Lower and Upper Yafai. Sultan Aidrus accorded him a warm welcome and gave him every assistance in his journey.

In 1926 Sultan Aidrus bin Mulisin was granted a personal salute of 9 guns.

In 1931, the population of Lower Yafai was estimated at 70,000, and the gross revenue at Rs. 10,000 a year.

The Lower Yafa Sultanate was a founding member of the Federation of Arab Emirates of the South in 1959 and its successor, the Federation of South Arabia, in 1963. Its last sultan, Mahmūd ibn Aidrūs Al Afīfi, was deposed and his state abolished in 1967 upon the founding of the People's Republic of South Yemen. Eventually South Yemen united with North Yemen in 1990 to form the Republic of Yemen.

== Geography ==
Its capital was the former residence of the Banū Afīf Sultans. There was a second capital in Al Qara where a picturesque palace, the mountain retreat of the Sultan, was located.

== Rulers ==
Afif, 1681–1700.

Qahtan ibn Afif, 1700–1720.

Sayf ibn Qahtan al-Afifi, 1720–1740.

Ma`awda ibn Sayf al-Afifi, 1740–1760.

Ghalib ibn Ma`awda al-Afifi, 1760–1780

Abd al-Karim ibn Ghalib al-Afifi, 1780–1800.

Ali I ibn Ghalib al-Afifi, 1800–1841.

Ahmad ibn Ali al-Afifi, 1841–1873 (1st time).

Ali II ibn Ahmad al-Afifi, 1873–1885.

Muhsin I ibn Ahmad al-Afifi, 1885–1891.

Ahmad ibn Ali al-Afifi, 1891–1893 (2nd time).

Abu Bakr ibn Sha'if al-Afifi, 1893–1899.

Abd Allah ibn Muhsin al-Afifi, 1899–1916.

Muhsin II ibn Ali al-Afifi, 1916–1925.

Aydarus ibn Muhsin al-Afifi, 1925–1958.

Regent, 1947–1949. .... –

Mahmud ibn Aydarus al-Afifi, 1958–1967.

== See also ==
- List of Sunni Muslim dynasties
- Federation of South Arabia
- Upper Yafa
