= Maflahi =

Coordinates: 13°41′N 44°43′E

Muflihi Sheikdom مشيخة المفلحي
- State of the Federation of South Arabia
- 1850–1967
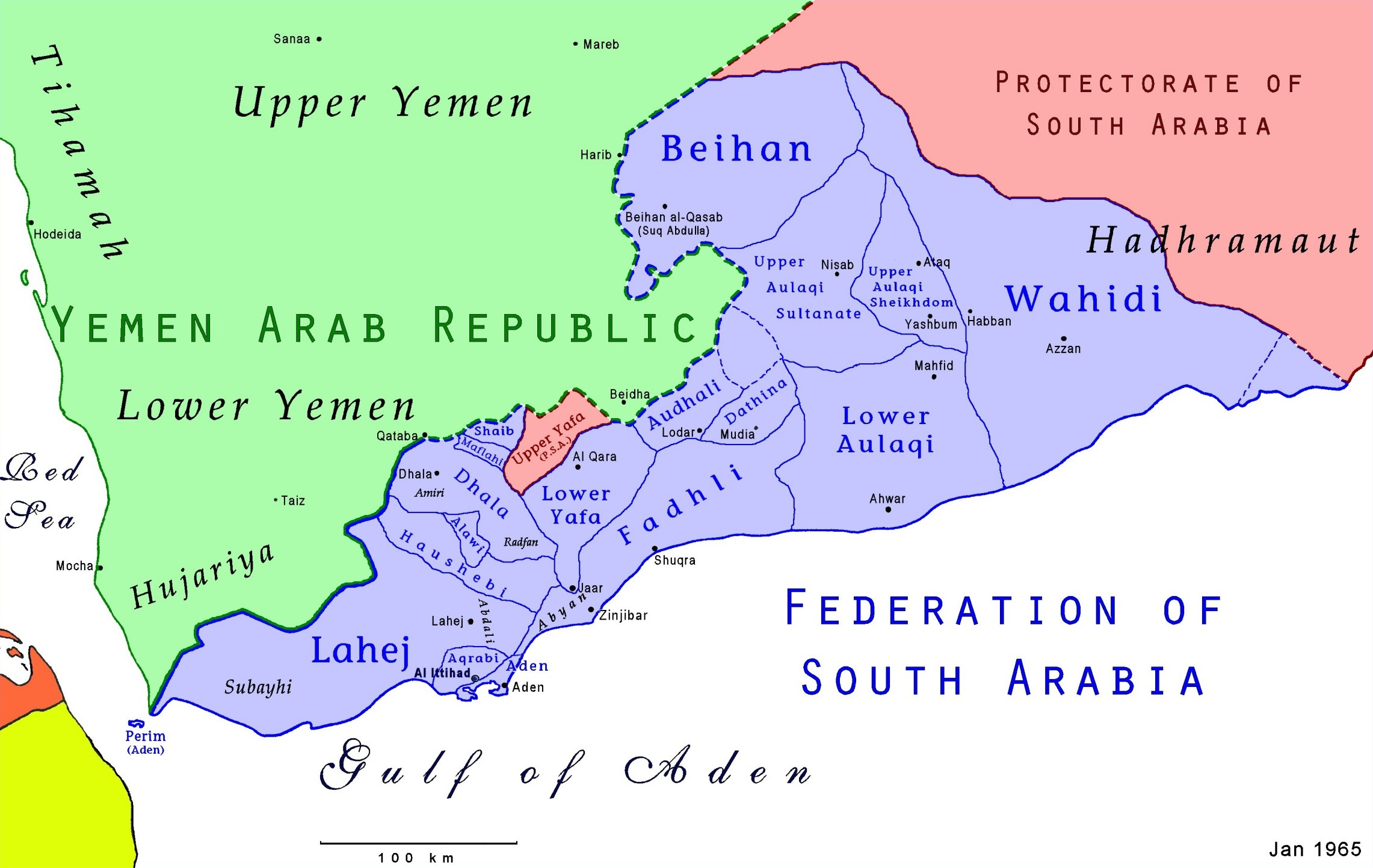
- Map of the Federation of South Arabia
- Capital: Ad Dali'
  - Type: Sheikhdom
- Historical era: 20th century
  - Established: 1850
  - Disestablished: 1967
Preceded by	Succeeded by
Federation of Arab Emirates of the South	South Yemen

Muflihi, Muflahi (Arabic: مفلحي Muflaḥī), Muflihi or the Muflahi Sheikhdom (Arabic: مشيخة المفلحي Mashyakhat al-Muflaḥī), was a state in the British Aden Protectorate. Its last sheikh, Kassim Abdulrahaman Al-Muflihi, was deposed in 1967 upon the founding of the People's Republic of South Yemen and the area is now part of the Republic of Yemen.

== History ==
Muflihi was originally one of the five sheikhdoms of Upper Yafa but joined the Federation of South Arabia and its successor, the Federation of South Arabia, as a separate state. Although most of the Al Muflahi family members still reside in Yemen, some members of the family migrated north of the Arabian peninsula in the early 1960s by settling into countries such as Saudi Arabia, Kuwait, United Arab Emirates and Qatar. Recently, many have moved to western countries as well, including the United Kingdom in areas such as Birmingham and the United States of America; in the latter they live predominantly in the Metro Detroit area.

=== Sheikhs ===
- 1850 – 1885 al-Qasim al-Sakkaf
- 1885 – 1920 `Abd al-Rahman ibn al-Qasim al-Sakkaf
- 1920 – 12 August 1967 al-Qasim ibn `Abd al-Rahman
- 1967 – 2000 Abd al-Hamid ibn Qasim
- 2000 – Present `Ammar ibn `Abd al-Hamid

== See also ==
- Aden Protectorate
- Upper Yafa
