= Hadrami sheikhdom =

Coordinates: 13°53′N 45°14′E

Hadhrami Sheikdom مشيخة الحضرمي
- State of the Protectorate of South Arabia
- 1820–1967
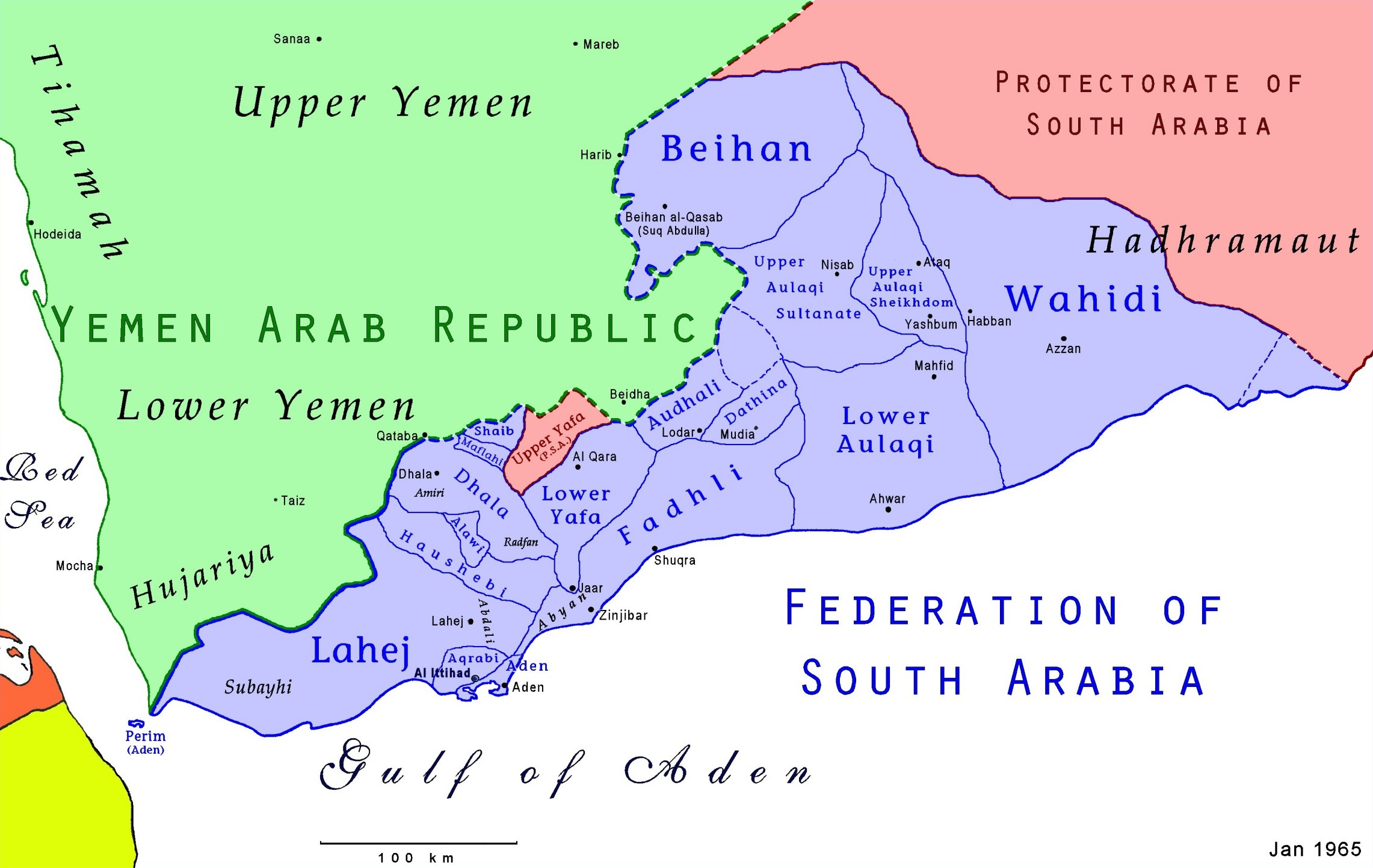
- Map of the Federation of South Arabia
- Capital: Al-Shibr
  - Type: Sheikhdom
- Historical era: 20th century
  - Established: 1820
  - Disestablished: 1967
Preceded by	Succeeded by
Federation of Arab Emirates of the South	South Yemen

The Hadrami or Hadhrami Sheikdom (Arabic: مشيخة الحضرمي), Maktab Al Hadharem (Arabic: مكتب الحضارم), or Al Hadharem (Arabic: الحضارم), is one of the five sheikdoms of Upper Yafa. The Hadrami sheikdom was divided into four quarters: Sinaani (سناني), Bal Hay (بلحأي), Thuluthi (ثلثي), and Marfadi (مرفدي). The capital of the sheikdom is the village of Al-Shibr (Arabic: قرية الشبر), which is located in the Sinaani quarter.

== History ==
The state was abolished on 14 August 1967 upon the founding of the People's Republic of Yemen. In 1990, it became part of the Republic of Yemen.

=== Rulers ===
Hadrami was ruled by sheikhs who bore the title Shaykh al-Mashyakha al-Hadramiyya.

==== Sheikhs ====
- 1820 - 1850 Abu Hajar Ghalib al-Hadrami
- 1850 - 1870 Muhammad ibn Ghalib al-Hadrami
- 1870 - 1900 Muhsin ibn Ghalib al-Hadrami
- 1900 - 1915 Muhsin ibn Muhsin al-Hadrami
- 1915 - 1945 Nasi ibn Muhsin al-Hadrami
- 1945 - 1958 Muhammad ibn Muhsin al Hadrami
- 1959 `Abd Allah ibn Muhammad al-Hadrami
- 1959 - 1967 `Abd al-Qawi ibn Muhammad al-Hadrami

== See also ==
- Aden Protectorate
- Upper Yafa
