= Protectorate of South Arabia =

1963–1967 British protectorate in south Arabia

Protectorate of South Arabia محمية الجنوب العربي
- 1963–1967
- Map of the Protectorate of South Arabia
- Status: British protectorate
- Common languages: Arabic
- Historical era: Cold War
  - Established: 18 January 1963
  - Disestablished: 30 November 1967
- Currency: East African shilling, then South Arabian dinar (1965–67)
Preceded by	Succeeded by
Aden Protectorate	South Yemen

The Protectorate of South Arabia (Arabic: محمية الجنوب العربي), also known as the Eastern Aden Protectorate, consisted of various states located at the southern end of the Arabian Peninsula under treaties of protection with Britain. The area of the former protectorate became part of South Yemen after the Aden Emergency and is now part of the Republic of Yemen.

== History ==
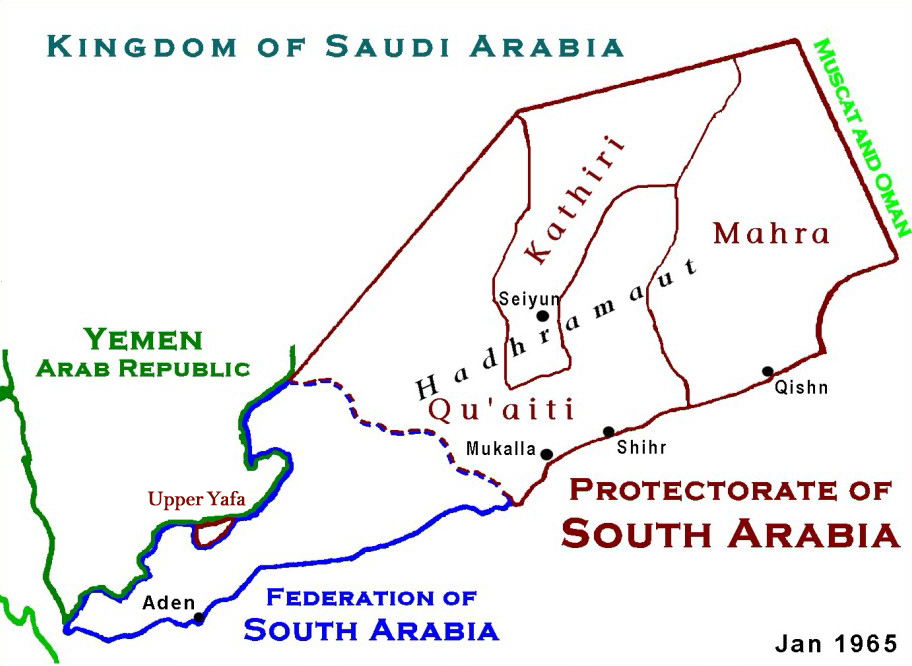
Map of the southern Arabian peninsula in 1965.

The Protectorate of South Arabia was designated on 18 January 1963 as consisting of those areas of the Aden Protectorate that did not join the Federation of South Arabia, and it broadly, but not exactly, corresponded to the division of the Aden Protectorate which was called the Eastern Aden Protectorate.

The protectorate included the Hadhrami states of Kathiri, Mahra, and Qu'aiti except the three Wahidi Sultanates in the Eastern Aden Protectorate, with Upper Yafa in the Western Aden Protectorate. The Protectorate of South Arabia was dissolved on 30 November 1967 and its constituent states quickly collapsed, leading to the abolition of their monarchies. The territory was absorbed into the newly independent People's Republic of South Yemen, which became part of the Republic of Yemen in 1990.

== States ==
- Mahra Sultanate
- Kathiri Sultanate
- Qu'aiti Sultanate
- Upper Yafa

Former states of the British Aden Protectorate were united in the 1960s to form the People's Republic of South Yemen, which became independent on 30 November 1967. South Yemen later merged with North Yemen to form the modern state of Yemen in 1990.

== List of rulers ==
State	Ruler	Deposed	House	Reign	Ref(s)
Kathiri	Husayn ibn Ali	2 October 1967	Al Kathiri	Last reigning Sultan (1949–1967)	
Mahra	Abdullah ibn Ashur	16 October 1967	Banu Afrar	Last reigning Sultan (1966–1967)	
Qu'aiti	Ghalib II	17 September 1967	Al Qu'aiti	Last reigning Sultan (1966–1967)	
Upper Yafa	Muhammad ibn Salih	29 November 1967	Harharah	Last reigning Sultan (1948–1967)	

== See also ==
- South Yemen
- Hadhrami Bedouin Legion
