= List of wars involving Yemen =

This is a list of wars involving the Republic of Yemen and its predecessor states.

== Predecessor states ==
Date	Name of the battle	Part of	1st combattant	2nd combattant	Result
570	Siege of Sanaa (570)	Aksumite–Persian wars	Sasanian Empire	Kingdom of Aksum	Sasanian victory
26 February 1548	Capture of Aden (1548)	Ottoman–Portuguese conflicts (1538–1560) (Ottoman–Portuguese confrontations)	Ottoman Empire	Portuguese Empire	
7 April 1548	Battle of al-Shihr (1548)	/	Portuguese Empire and Mahra Sultanate	Kathiri	Portuguese victory
January 1551	Battle of Bab al-Mandab	Ottoman–Portuguese conflicts (1538–1560) (Ottoman–Portuguese confrontations)	Portuguese Empire	Ottoman Empire	Ottoman victory
February 1558	Attack on Mocha	Ottoman–Portuguese conflicts (1538–1560) (Ottoman–Portuguese confrontations)	Portuguese Empire	Ottoman Empire	Ottoman victory
1560		Ottoman–Portuguese conflicts (1538–1560) (Ottoman–Portuguese confrontations)	Portuguese Empire	Ottoman Empire	Ottoman victory

== North Yemen ==
Conflict	Combatant 1	Combatant 2	Result	Head of State
1931 Saudi–Yemeni border skirmish (1931)	Kingdom of Yemen	Kingdom of Hejaz and Nejd	Unclear: Military outcome unclear; Status quo ante bellum	Imam Yahya
Najran conflict (1931/1932)	Kingdom of Yemen	Kingdom of Hejaz and Nejd	Inconclusive	Imam Yahya
Saudi–Yemeni war (1934) (1934)	Kingdom of Yemen; Supported by: Italy	Kingdom of Saudi Arabia	Saudi victory: Treaty of Taif signed on 14 June 1934: Jizan, Asir, and Najran become provinces of Saudi Arabia; Saudi Arabia leaves and returns control of Hajjah and Hodeidah to Yemen; Enforcement of a 20 years non-aggression pact; Yemen pays Saudi Arabia 100,000 British pounds in war indemnities	Imam Yahya
1948 Arab–Israeli War (1948–1949)	Arab League: Egypt; All-Palestine Protectorate (Note: After 22 September 1948); Holy War Army; Transjordan; Iraq; Syria; Lebanon (Note: Lebanon had decided to not participate in the war and only took part in the battle of al-Malikiya on 5–6 June 1948.); Saudi Arabia; Yemen Irregulars: Arab Liberation Army; Al-Najjada; Holy War Army	Israel Before 26 May 1948: (Israel) Yishuv; Paramilitary groups: Haganah; Palmach; Hish; Him; Irgun; Lehi; Allied Bedouin tribes After 26 May 1948: Israel Defense Forces; Minorities Unit; Foreign volunteers: Mahal	Defeat: Israeli victory; Establishment of the State of Israel; Partial Jordanian victory; Jordanian annexation of the West Bank; Palestinian defeat; 1948 Palestinian expulsion and flight; Beginning of the Palestinian Fedayeen insurgency; Establishment of the State of Israel, Jordanian annexation of the West Bank, Egyptian occupation of the Gaza Strip	Ahmad bin Yahya
North Yemen civil war (1962–1970)	Kingdom of Yemen; Saudi Arabia	Yemen Arab Republic; Egypt	Republican victory	Muhammad al-Badr
First Yemenite War (1972)	North Yemen	South Yemen	Status quo ante bellum	Abdul Rahman al-Eryani
NDF Rebellion (1978–1982)	North Yemen; Republic of China; Islamic Front; Supported by: United States	National Democratic Front; Revolutionary Democratic Party of Yemen; Organisation of Yemeni Revolutionary Resistors; Popular Vanguard; Labour Party; Popular Democratic Union; Supported by: South Yemen; Libya	Government victory	Ali Abdullah Saleh
Second Yemenite War (1979)	North Yemen	South Yemen	South Yemeni victory	Ali Abdullah Saleh

== South Yemen ==
Conflict	Combatant 1	Combatant 2	Result	Head of Government
Aden Emergency (1963–1967)	National Liberation Front (NLF) Front for the Liberation of Occupied South Yemen (FLOSY); Supported by: United Arab Republic	United Kingdom Federation of South Arabia: State of Aden; Alawi Sheikhdom; Aqrabi Sheikhdom; Audhali Sultanate; Emirate of Beihan; Dathina Sheikhdom; Emirate of Dhala; Fadhli Sultanate; Haushabi Sultanate; Sultanate of Lahej; Lower Aulaqi Sultanate; Sultanate of Lower Yafa; Muflahi Sheikhdom; Sheikhdom of Shaib; Upper Aulaqi Sheikhdom; Upper Aulaqi Sultanate; Wahidi Sultanate; Protectorate of South Arabia: Mahra Sultanate; Kathiri Sultanate; Qu'aiti Sultanate; Upper Yafa; Sheikhdom of al-Hawra; Sheikhdom of al-`Irqa; South Arabian League; Supported by: Saudi Arabia	Yemeni NLF victory: British withdrawal; Independence of South Yemen	None
Al-Wadiah War (1969)	South Yemen	Saudi Arabia; Supported by: Pakistan (air support)	Saudi victory: al-Wadiah and Sharurah captured by Saudi forces	Muhammad Ali Haitham
First Yemenite War (1972)	South Yemen	North Yemen	Status quo ante bellum	Ali Nasir Muhammad
Lebanese Civil War (1976–1977)	Lebanese Armed Forces Arab Deterrent Force (from 1976) (Note: Although nominally present at the behest of the government of Lebanon, the force was under the direct command of Syria.): Saudi Arabia (from 1976); Sudan (from 1976); UAE (from 1976); Libya (1976 only); South Yemen (1976–1977)	Lebanese Front (from 1976): Kataeb Party; National Liberal Party; Lebanese Forces; Marada Brigade; Guardians of the Cedars; Al-Tanzim; Lebanese Youth Movement (MKG); Tyous Team of Commandos; Zahliote Group; Shuraya Party; Vanguard of the Maani Army (MDJ); Other minor organizations; Army of Free Lebanon; South Lebanon Army (from 1977) Lebanese National Movement; PLO; ASALA Syria (1976); Amal Movement; PNSF; Lebanese Forces – Executive Command	Withdrawal: South Yemen withdraws from the ADF force in 1977; Syria occupies northern/eastern Lebanon until 30 April 2005	Ali Nasir Muhammad
Ogaden War (1977–1978)	Ethiopia; Cuba; Soviet Union; South Yemen	Somalia; WSLF	Ethiopian victory: Somalia breaks all ties with the Soviet Bloc and the Second World (except China and Romania).; Beginning of the Somali Rebellion	Ali Nasir Muhammad
Second Yemenite War (1979)	South Yemen	North Yemen	South Yemeni victory	Ali Nasir Muhammad
South Yemeni crisis (1986)	al-Zomrah faction of the Yemeni Socialist Party	al-Toghmah faction of the Yemeni Socialist Party	al-Toghmah faction victory: Defeat of al-Zomrah faction and their exile to the Yemen Arab Republic; Death of Abdul Fattah Ismail, Ali Antar, Saleh Moslih, and Ali Shayi'; Assumption of power by Ali Salem al-Beidh and Haidar Abu Bakr al-Attas	Haidar Abu Bakr al-Attas

== Unified Yemen ==
Conflict	Combatant 1	Combatant 2	Result	Head of State
Yemeni Civil War (1994)	Yemen; Islamic Jihad in Yemen; Yemeni Socialist Party (al-Zomrah faction)	(South Yemen) Democratic Republic of Yemen: Yemeni Socialist Party	Unionist victory (Note: See the § Aftermath section)	Ali Abdullah Saleh
Hanish Islands conflict (1995)	Yemen	Eritrea	Eritrean military victory: Eritrean occupation of Greater Hanish until 1998. The Permanent Court of Arbitration determined that most of the archipelago belonged to Yemen, while some small islands closest to Eritrea belonged to Eritrea.	Ali Abdullah Saleh
Al-Qaeda insurgency in Yemen (1998 – present)	Republic of Yemen (internationally recognized; led by the PLC since 2022): Yemeni Armed Forces; Republican Guard; General People's Congress (anti-Houthi); STC (2022–present) (Note: Since April 2022, the Southern Transitional Council is part of the Yemeni government led by the Presidential Leadership Council. Multiple sources:); United Arab Emirates; Yemeni National Resistance (2017–present); Tihamah Resistance; Giants Brigades; Hadhramaut Tribal Alliance; Al-Islah; Bani Dhabyan; Saleh loyalists (2017–present); Popular Resistance Committees; Popular Committees; Saudi-led coalition: Saudi Arabia; United Arab Emirates; Sudan; Senegal; Morocco (2015–19); Qatar (2015–17); Bahrain; South Korea; Academi security guards (2015–16); Supported by: United States: U.S. Navy (Note: logistic support and assistance with the naval blockade of Houthi-held territories in October 2016); United States Army (Special Forces); United Kingdom (Note: training, intelligence, logistical support, weapons, and blockade up to 2017); France; Canada; Belarus: Belarusian military specialists; Malaysia; Australia STC (2017–2022) United Arab Emirates	al-Qaeda: AQAP; Ansar al-Sharia; Islamic Emirate of Yemen; Aden-Abyan Islamic Army; Council of Sunni Scholars and al-Jama'a; Hadrami Domestic Council faction; al-Dhahab tribesmen; Supported by: al-Shabaab (2009–present) (alleged); al-Qaeda in the Islamic Maghreb (2009–2017); al-Qaeda in the Indian Subcontinent (2014–present); Al-Nusra Front (2012–2017); Alleged Support: Iran (denied); Qatar (denied); Supreme Political Council (formerly SRC): Houthi movement; General People's Congress (pro-Houthi); Saleh loyalists (until 2017); Pro-Houthi Popular Committees; Sanaa-GPC forces; Alleged support: Iran; Hezbollah; North Korea; Islamic State: Islamic State - Yemen Province	Ongoing: Escalation into crisis and civil war; Yemeni Crisis begins in late January 2011; On 31 March 2011, AQAP declared the Islamic Emirate of Yemen	Ali Abdullah Saleh
First Sa'dah War (2004)	Yemen	Houthis	Government victory: Death of Hussein al-Houthi	Ali Abdullah Saleh
Second Sa'dah War (2005)	Yemen	Houthis	Government victory: Houthis surrender after signing a deal	Ali Abdullah Saleh
Third Sa'dah War (2005–2006)	Yemen	Houthis	Government victory: Fighting ends before Presidential election	Ali Abdullah Saleh
Fourth Sa'dah War (2007)	Yemen	Houthis	Government victory: Rebel leaders go into exile	Ali Abdullah Saleh
Fifth Sa'dah War (2008)	Yemen	Houthis	Stalemate: Yemeni government declares unilateral ceasefire	Ali Abdullah Saleh
Sixth Sa'dah War (2009–2010)	Yemen; Hashed tribesmen Saudi Arabia; Alleged support: Morocco; Jordan	Houthis; Alleged support: Iran: Quds Force; Hezbollah	Stalemate: Ceasefire after rebels accepted the government's truce conditions.	Ali Abdullah Saleh
South Yemen insurgency (2009– present)	Government: Yemen Army; Yemeni Republican Guard; Yemeni Air Force; Yemen Paramilitary; Pro-government tribes: Al-Islah militias; Supported by: Saudi Arabia	(South Yemen) Southern Transitional Council (since 2017): Southern Movement; Southern Resistance; Security Belt; Supported by: United Arab Emirates	Ongoing	Ali Abdullah Saleh
Yemeni Revolution (2011–2012)	Government: General People's Congress; Yemen Army; Yemeni Police Force; Central Security Organization; Republican Guards; Yemeni Air Force; Pro-government tribes	(Yemen) Opposition: Joint Meeting Parties; Al-Islah; Yemeni Socialist Party; Southern Movement; Houthis; Student activists; Hashid; Alliance of Yemeni Tribes; Defected soldiers; Civil Bloc; National Dialogue Committee	Overthrow of Saleh government: Resignation of Prime Minister Mujawar; Resignation of MPs from the ruling party; Occupation of several regions and cities in Yemen by Al-Qaeda and Houthi rebels; AQAP declares the Islamic Emirate of Yemen; Restructure of the military forces by sacking several of its leaders; Approval of President's immunity from prosecution by Yemeni legislators; One candidate Presidential election held to replace Saleh as the new president of Yemen; Abdrabbuh Mansur Hadi elected and inaugurated	Ali Abdullah Saleh
Seventh Sa'dah War (2012–2015)	Yemen	Houthis	Escalation into full-scale civil war: Houthis take control of northern Yemen	Abdrabbuh Mansur Hadi
Yemeni Civil War (2014– present)	Republic of Yemen (internationally-recognized; led by the PLC since 2022); Yemeni Armed Forces; Republican Guard; GPC; STC (2022–present); United Arab Emirates; National Resistance (2017–present); Tihamah Resistance; Giants Brigades; Hadhramaut Tribal Alliance; Al-Islah; Bani Dhabyan; Saleh loyalists (2017–present); Popular Resistance; Popular Committees; Saudi-led coalition: Saudi Arabia; United Arab Emirates; Sudan; Senegal; Morocco (2015–19); Qatar (2015–17); Kuwait; Bahrain; Academi security guards (2015–16) Janjaweed (2019-2023); STC (2017–2022); United Arab Emirates	Supreme Political Council (formerly SRC); Houthis; GPC (pro-Houthi); Saleh loyalists (until 2017); Pro-Houthi Popular Committees; Sanaa-GPC forces; Al-Qaeda and allies; AQAP; Ansar al-Sharia; Council of Scholars of Ahl al-Sunna wal-Jama'ah; Hadhrami Domestic council; Dhi Na'im tribe; Al-Hamiqan tribe; Islamic State; Yemen Province	Ongoing, ceasefire since 2 April 2022 with some periodic clashes: Houthis take control of Sanaa (2014); Saudi Arabian-led coalition forces intervene from 2015, backing the Hadi-led government; Former President Saleh is killed (2017); United Nations announce two-month nationwide truce on 2 April 2022; further extended on 2 June and officially expired in October but still active; Hadi-led government resigns (7 April 2022); Transfer of power to the PLC, consisting of STC representatives; Rashad al-Alimi becomes President and STC President Aidarus al-Zoubaidi becomes Vice President; STC launches an offensive against the Islah party, taking large amounts of territory (August 2022); Negotiations to end the civil war that include all major combatants start in April 2023 after Iran and Saudi Arabia resume diplomatic relations; Red Sea crisis begins in 2023 leading to Operation Prosperity Guardian, 2024 missile strikes in Yemen and March 2025 United States attacks in Yemen.	Abdrabbuh Mansur Hadi (Cabinet of Yemen) Mohammed Ali al-Houthi (SPC)
