= Yemeni War =

Yemeni or Yemenite War may refer to various events in the history of Yemen:

- Yemeni–Ottoman conflicts (up to 1911)
- North Yemeni Civil War (1962–1970)
- Aden Emergency also known as the Radfan Uprising (1963–1967)
- (First) Yemenite War of 1972 (1972)
- (Second) Yemenite War of 1979 (1979)
- South Yemeni Civil War (1986)
- (First) Yemeni Civil War (1994)
- (Second) Yemeni Civil War (2014–present)

== See also ==
- Yemen
- List of wars involving Yemen
