= Yemeni civil war =

Yemeni civil war may refer to:

- North Yemen civil war, 1962–1970
- South Yemeni crisis, 13–25 January 1986
- Yemeni civil war (1994)
- Yemeni civil war (2014–present)

== See also ==
- Insurgency in Yemen (disambiguation)
- List of wars involving Yemen
- Yemen war (disambiguation)
- Yemeni coup d'état (disambiguation)
- Yemeni revolution (disambiguation)
