= Jarallah Omar =

Yemeni politician and guerrilla fighter (1942–2002)

- جار الله عمر

Personal details
- Born: 1942 Kuhal, Ibb Governorate
- Died: 28 December 2002 (aged 59–60) Sanaa, Yemen

Jarallah Omar al-Kuhali (Arabic: جار الله عمر; 1942 – 28 December 2002) was a Yemeni politician, intellectual, and guerrilla fighter.

== Life ==
He was trained in Islamic law, but in the 1960s he turned towards Marxism. He was a political prisoner from 1968 to 1971 and participated in the civil war against the Northern Government as one of the leaders of the National Democratic Front, a politico-military coalition affiliated to the socialist government of the South. He escaped to the South after his forces were defeated by then-North Yemeni President Ali Abdullah Saleh. Omar became a member of the Politburo of the Yemeni Socialist Party (YSP), the ruling party in the South, and was named minister of culture in the government of a newly unified Yemen in the early 1990s. He resigned his cabinet post and went into exile shortly before a failed attempt by former southern politicians to re-establish a "Democratic Republic of Yemen" in 1994. The president of the ephemeral secessionist regime, Ali Salem al-Beidh, was a former ally of Omar in the factional disputes within the YSP in 1986. When Omar returned to the country in 1995, he developed a reputation as a leading advocate of human rights and political freedoms in the authoritarian political climate of Yemen.

== Assassination ==
Omar was assassinated in Sanaa in December 2002, receiving two shots to the chest. The assassin was 26-year-old Ali Ahmad al-Jarallah, an Islamist hardliner who sided with Saleh's government in the civil war. He was arrested immediately following the shooting and in interrogation revealed plots to kill other secular leftist (Nasserite and Baathist) leaders. He was sentenced to death on 14 September 2003.

== Aftermath ==
At the time of Omar's death, he was deputy secretary-general of the YSP. He was buried in the "martyrs' cemetery" in Sanaa, on the orders of President Saleh.
