= South Arabia (disambiguation) =

South Arabia is a region in the Arabian Peninsula.

South Arabia may also refer to:

- Federation of South Arabia, former British protectorate in Aden and its hinterland
- Federation of the Emirates of South Arabia
- Yemen, a country in South Arabia
  - South Yemen, a former country in South Arabia
