= Insurgency in Yemen =

Insurgency in Yemen or Yemeni insurgency may refer to any of the following:

- Aden Emergency (1963–1967), insurgency in South Yemen against British rule
- NDF Rebellion (1978–1982), insurgency in North Yemen against Ali Abdullah Saleh
- Al-Qaeda insurgency in Yemen (1998–present), escalated into the Yemeni crisis and the Yemeni civil war (2014–present)
- Houthi insurgency (2004–2014), in former North Yemen, which escalated into the Yemeni civil war
- South Yemen insurgency (2009–2026), escalated into the Yemeni crisis and the Yemeni civil war

== See also ==
- Terrorism in Yemen
- Yemeni Civil War (disambiguation)
