= Arab Hope Party =

Social democratic political party in Yemen

Arab Hope Party حزب الأمل العربي
- Leader: Layla ath-Thawr
- Founded: 2011
- Ideology: Pacifism; Feminism; Goals of the Arab Spring
- Political position: Center-left
- Colours: Red
- House of Representatives: 0 / 301

The Arab Hope Party (Arabic: حزب الأمل العربي, Ḥizb al-Amal al-'Arabī), is a center-left political party in Yemen that was founded as the Arab Spring Party (Arabic: حزب الربيع العربي, Ḥizb ar-Rabī'a al-'Arabī) in December 2011. The party reportedly arose from the youth sit-ins of the Yemeni Revolution and was built up by Layla ath-Thawr and her sister Amal, making it the first female-led party in the country and one of the first in the Arab World. The party was founded as a reaction to a perceived attempt of established parties to hijack the revolution for their political agendas.

After the foundation, Layla ath-Thawr was elected "leader of the political bureau and relations". She is a peace- and Human rights-activist and mother of four, who participated in the sit-ins and witnessed numerous violent crimes against the protesters. In 2011 she was one of the initiators of the Civil Alliance for Peace and Protection of Rights and Freedoms, an umbrella organization uniting 66 civil society organizations and unions, such as the Federation of Yemeni Workers.

When the Houthis rose to power, the party joined the Supreme Revolutionary Committee alongside 12 other parties and movements such as the Arab Socialist Ba'ath Party – Yemen Region, Al-Ahrar Organization, National Accord Party and others. It also opposed the Saudi-led intervention in Yemen and met the United Nations' Under-Secretary-General for Humanitarian Affairs and Emergency Relief Coordinator, Stephen O'Brien on 11 August 2015, to discuss the humanitarian situation in the country. During the meeting, ath-Thawr asked to put pressure on the United Nations Security Council to put an end to what she called an aggression and unjust siege against her country.

== Positions ==
=== Goals of the Arab Spring ===
The party strongly criticizes the corruption in the bureaucratic structures of the Yemeni state. Also, the party advocates for the establishment of a modern civil state based on democracy and the protection of Human rights, freedoms, dignity, justice and equality.

=== Pacifism ===
The party rejected the armed conflicts in Yemen from the start and emphasizes the importance of a peaceful democratic process and transition of power. Fearing that the clashes in Dammaj could escalate to end up in Sanaa, the party leader ath-Thawr met with the speaker of the House of Representatives Yahya ar-Ra'i, calling on him to speak out against the acts of violence. When the war started, ath-Thawr got engaged in acvocating for the release of prisoners of war, which included many child soldiers. She condemned the war as a "machinery of death". The party leader stated that violence can never solve a conflict and that the civil society is a vital part for finding a solution to the Yemeni civil war.

=== Feminism ===
The party considers women's rights in the country to have been usurped by groups with reactionary and extremist ideas and mentalities and calls on women in the country to get politically active and lead the struggle against this oppression. The party sees it as integral process to convince the society and the notables of the role of the women and is proud of the Yemeni history, as the party claims Yemen to be the only country that has been ruled by over nine queens in its history. The party leader ath-Thawr, who has organized events in which she talked about gender equality and awareness, also said that she often confronts male politicians that they have to prove their trustworthiness when it comes to the empowerment of women by giving leadership positions to women. Furthermore, she claims that women are playing a major role in initiatives for peace and the release of prisoners.

Layla ath-Thawr also underlined that she experienced a lot of criticism and belittlement in conversation with other political figures due to her being a woman, especially when she didn't receive legitimacy from tribal elites yet. For example, she claims that on several occasions, men tried to brand initiatives regarding the release of prisoners organized by her as their own doing. The party leader also has been involved in organizing the release of women and girls abducted by criminal gangs.

In an interview with al-Methaq, the newspaper of the General People's Congress, Layla ath-Thawr criticized that women are excluded from official peace talks between the warring factions in the country. She argued, that the exclusion is one of the reasons why the language of violence gets favoured over a language of rationality, logic and wisdom to resolve the conflict. The Houthis, ath-Thawr argued, are following an extremist agenda to transform Yemeni society by destroying the historically important role of the women into a herd that can be pushed around without protest.

=== Criticism of the Houthis ===
Over the years, the party has become more critical of the Houthi movement. In an article published by the Washington Institute in 2023, party leader ath-Thawr accused the Houthis of cementing their authoritarianism and indoctrinating children and the society. She claimed, that the new curriculum for school and the new codex for the approximately 1.2 Million civil servants are designed to institutionally promote their ideology. She said that this process is ongoing since the Houthi takeover in Yemen. Also, she accused the Houthis of corruption, enriching their leaders while not paying the salaries of ordinary civil servants for months. The combination of promoting their ideology and pausing salaries are used to push the remaining people who oppose the Houthis out of the institutions, ath-Thawr stated.

== Anti-war activities ==
The party leader organized a bureau collecting information on prisoners of war and connected with another such organization active in southern Yemen. Ath-Thawr criticized that international organizations such as UNICEF and the International Red Cross showed little interest to help despite being contacted and informed about the huge number of children being used as fighters and ending up as prisoners of war. Despite that, she managed to negotiate with high-ranking members of both sides of the war. She convinced Hakim al-Hassani, a leader in the Southern Resistance to agree to complete a comprehensive exchange of prisoners. He also helped her to organize visits to prisoners in the detention centers of various factions of the Southern Resistance. After almost seven months of negotiations, her initiative succeeded in organizing the release of 480 prisoners of war between the Houthis and the Southern Movement on 17 December 2015. In total, she claims to have been involved in organizing the release of over a thousand prisoners.

Ath-Thawr's visits to prisons of all sides of the war, combined with establishing contact between prisoners and their families and the organization of exchanges gave her the nickname "mother of prisoners." When the success of her initiative became more clear, ath-Thawr claims, international organizations that were initially not interested to help her suddenly were keen on getting their signatures on documents regarding an exchange of prisoners and tried to diminish her role in it. For her activities, she was awarded the title "ambassador of peace and Human rights" by several international and local organizations.

== Repression against the party ==
On 19 November 2015, Abdulmalik al-Hajri, the secretary general of the pro-Houthi Yemeni Dignity Party, publicly threatened the party leader Layla ath-Thawr. The party reacted by announcing the intent to confront al-Hajri with a lawsuit.

On 15 January 2018, when returning to her car after getting some things from her house, ath-Thawr found a bullet hole in the front window and a bullet inside her car. She contacted notables from the Houthi movement about the death threat, but only got advised to lower her advocacy activities, as this would likely be connected to the prisoner release she organized in December 2017.

Later that year, a Houthi leader accused her of being part of a sleeper cell following a post on Facebook, in which she condemned a Houthi crackdown on private shops, the looting of private property and the pausing of the payment of salaries for civil servants.

In March 2018, party leader Layla ath-Thawr was arrested by the Houthis and brought to the an-Nasr police station in Sanaa, where her personal phone was stolen. The arrest likely happened in response to her advocacy to release 80 prisoners from a prison in Sanaa during these days. After a public outcry, she was released after a few hours. Over the years, ath-Thawr also received a lot of death threats online and to her personal phone number.

Fearing for her life, party leader ath-Thawr fled from Yemen in 2018 and now lives in the diaspora in Egypt, where she also works as an advisor in the bureau of the United Nations envoy to Yemen.

== See also ==
- List of political parties in Yemen
