= National Solidarity Party =

National Solidarity Party may refer to one of the following parties.

- National Solidarity Party (Guatemala)
- National Solidarity Party (Peru)
- National Solidarity Party (Portugal)
- National Solidarity Party (Singapore)
- National Solidarity Party of Afghanistan
- National Solidarity Party (Yemen)
