= Yemeni coup d'état =

Yemeni coup d'état may refer to:

- Al-Waziri coup (1948), in the Kingdom of Yemen
- Yemeni coup attempt (1955)
- North Yemen coup d'état (1967)
- June 13 Corrective Movement (1974)
- Houthi takeover in Yemen (2014–15)
- North Yemen civil war (1962–1970)
- South Yemen civil war (1986)

== See also ==
- Yemeni revolution (disambiguation)
- Yemen war (disambiguation)
- Yemeni civil war (disambiguation)
