= Yemeni revolution (disambiguation) =

Yemeni revolution generally refers to the 2011 Yemeni revolution, but may also refer to:

- Alwaziri coup of 1947
- 1962 coup d'état in North Yemen
- Houthi takeover of Yemen
- The Yemeni Revolution (film), a 1966 Egyptian film
- Aden Emergency

== See also ==
- Yemeni coup d'état (disambiguation)
- Yemen war (disambiguation)
- Yemeni civil war (disambiguation)
