= Audhali =

Sultanate in Britain's Aden Protectorate

Coordinates: 13.54°N 45.52°E

Audhali Sultanate سلطنة العوذلي
- State of the Federation of South Arabia
- 18th century–1967
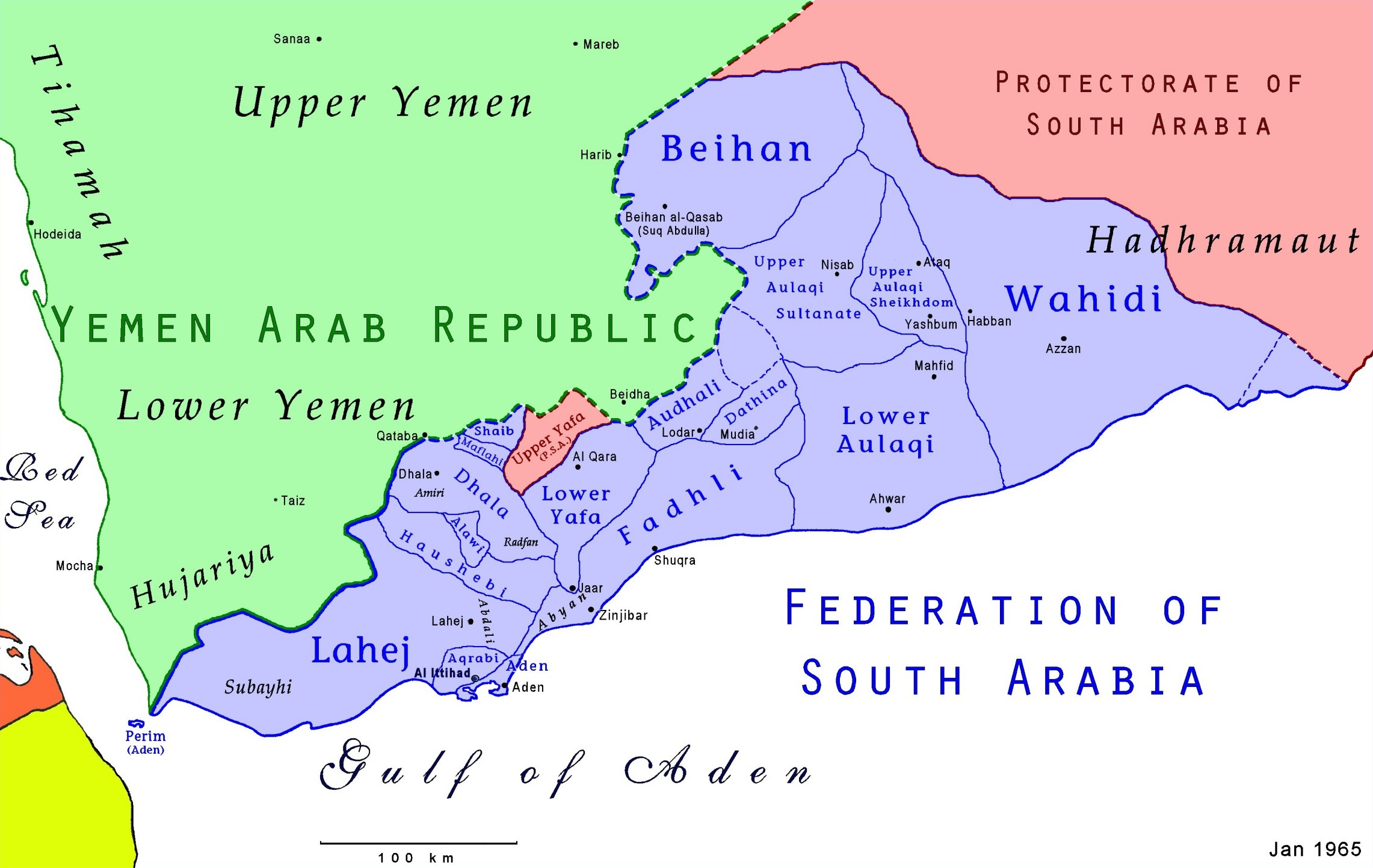
- Map of the Federation of South Arabia
- Capital: Zarah
  - Type: Sultanate
- Historical era: 20th century
  - Established: 18th century
  - Disestablished: 1967
Preceded by	Succeeded by
Federation of Arab Emirates of the South	South Yemen

Audhali (Arabic: العوذلي al-‘Awdhalī or العواذل al-‘Awādhal), or the Audhali Sultanate (Arabic: سلطنة العوذلي Salṭanat al-‘Awdhalī), was a state in the British Aden Protectorate. It was a founding member of the Federation of Arab Emirates of the South in 1959 and its successor, the Federation of South Arabia, in 1963. Its capital was Zarah.

The Audhali country was of considerable extent and lay between the Fadhli on the south, Aulaqi on the east and Yafai on the west.

== History ==
The date of the foundation of the Sultanate is uncertain.

The Sultan made overtures for treaty relations with the British in 1902, but he was not at the time considered of sufficient importance to be encouraged.

In 1903, owing to their supposed complicity with the Ahl Am Saidi of Dathina in an attack on a British survey party, the Audhali were excluded from Aden; but the overtures were continued, and in September 1914 a Protectorate Treaty was concluded with Sultan Qasim bin Ahmed. He was killed in September 1928 by the brothers Muhammad and Husein Jabil, of another branch of the family, and was succeeded by the son of the latter, Salih, a minor, under the regency of his uncle Muhammad.

In 1923 the Imam’s troops invaded and occupied the highland portion of Audhali territory known as Adh Dhahir. In 1925, in consequence of their encroaching still further and occupying the lowland portion, known as Al Kor, and the commercial town of Lodar together with the adjoining village of Al Kubeida where the Sultan resided, British air action was taken against them with tribal co-operation and they were compelled to withdraw from the lowland portion, but as of 1931, they were still in possession of the highlands.

Ahmed, the son of the murdered Sultan, and Qasim bin Abdulla, his cousin, had formed a rival faction to the brothers Jabil and have thrown in their lot with the Amil of Beidha, under the Imam, taking up their residence at Aryab in the highlands.

Its last sultan, Salih ibn al Husayn ibn Jabil Al Audhali, was deposed and his state was abolished in 1967 upon the founding of the People's Republic of South Yemen. The area is now part of the Republic of Yemen.

=== Rulers ===
The rulers of the `Awdhali Sultanate had the style of Sultan al-Saltana al-`Awdhaliyya.

==== Sultans ====
- c.1750 - 1780 Salih al-`Awdhali Ibn al-Awsaji
- c.1780 - 1820 Ja`bil ibn Salih al-`Awdhali ibn al-Awsaji
- c.1820 - 1870 Ahmad ibn Salih al-`Awdhali ibn al-Awsaji
- 1870 - 1890 Muhammad ibn Ahmad al-`Awdhali ibn al-Awsaji
- 1890 - 1900 Hamid ibn Ja`bil al-`Awdhali ibn al-Awsaji
- 1900 - 3 Sep 1928 al-Qasim ibn Hamid al-`Awdhali ibn al-Awsaji
- 1928 - Sep 1967 Salih ibn al-Husayn ibn Ja`bil al-`Awdhali ibn al-Awsaji
- 1928 - 19.. Muhammad Ja`bil -Regent

== See also ==
- Aden Protectorate
