= Al Qasha =

Coordinates: 13.468°N 44.656°E

Al Qasha was the capital of the Alawi sheikhdom in south Yemen. It is a small city bordering northern Yemen.

== History ==
The city was founded by sheikh Sayel Bin Alawi Al Rabaa in 1743, after he left his home in Najran, present day Saudi Arabia, to avoid problems between his family, the Hepatullah royal family of Najran, and his wife's family, the Hameduldeen royal family. He started his own sheikhdom of Al Alawi in Al Qasha in order to create a safe place for his family and people.

The Alawi sheikhdom remained until 1967.

== See also ==
- Aden Protectorate
