= Yemen war =

Yemen war may refer to:

- Saudi–Yemeni war (1934)
- North Yemen civil war (1962–1970)
- First Yemenite War
- NDF Rebellion (1978–1982)
- Second Yemenite War
- South Yemeni crisis (1986)
- Yemeni civil war (1994)
- Hanish Islands conflict (1995)
- Al-Qaeda insurgency in Yemen (1998–present)
- Houthi insurgency (2004–2015)
- South Yemen insurgency (2009–2015)
  - Yemeni civil war (2014–present)
    - Saudi-led intervention in the Yemeni civil war (2015–present)
    - Houthi–Saudi Arabian conflict
    - 2026 Yemen offensives
- Red Sea crisis
