= First Yemenite War =

Short military conflict between North and South Yemen

- Part of the Cold War and the Arab Cold War
- North & South Yemen
Date	26 September – 19 October 1972 (3 weeks and 2 days)
Location	North Yemen–South Yemen border
Result	Status quo ante bellum

Belligerents
North Yemen	South Yemen

Commanders and leaders
(Yemen Arab Republic) Abdul Rahman al-Eryani (Yemen Arab Republic) Ali Abdullah Saleh	Ali Antar

The First Yemenite War was a short military conflict between the Yemen Arab Republic (YAR; North Yemen) and the People's Democratic Republic of Yemen (PDRY; South Yemen).

== Background ==
South Arabian League (SAL) rebels attacked positions in eastern South Yemen, arriving from Saudi Arabia on February 20, 1972. The rebels were defeated by South Yemen government troops on February 24, 1972, with some 175 rebels killed during the military hostilities. Prime Minister Ali Nasir Muhammad survived an assassination attempt by SAL rebels on May 22, 1972. Six persons were sentenced to death for plotting to overthrow the government on July 9, 1972. Saudi Arabia continued to oppose South Yemen and supported the Northern Yemeni troops in the upcoming struggle.

== Conflict ==
The war, initiated by North Yemen, started on 26 September 1972, the tenth anniversary of the start of the North Yemen Civil War. A force composed of members of different political groups and exiled tribesmen from South Yemen, equipped with Alvis Saladin armoured cars provided by Libya and artillery donated by the North Yemeni military, invaded South Yemen in the Qatabah area. In response, the South Yemenis brought several of their battalions to the area of the border with the Yemen Arab Republic (North Yemen). The South Yemeni air force (PDRYAF) also started bombing the areas invaded by the Northerners, and their military positions. Over the course of one such mission, on 30 September, a PDRYAF MiG-17 fighter was shot down and its pilot killed. In the end, South Yemeni counterattacks supported by air strikes caused over 200 casualties to the invaders, and recovered all of the lost territory. Overall, during the short war, the Southern military demonstrated its capability to run well-planned operations. Its logistics system proved adequate, and the air force's actions in ground-attack and supply missions were deemed effective.

During the conflict, the Yemen Arab Republic (North) was supplied by Saudi Arabia, Jordan, Egypt, Iran, the United Kingdom and the United States and the People's Democratic Republic of Yemen (South) by the Soviet Union, Czechoslovakia, Iraq, Libya and Cuba. According to the CIA, "Cuban pilots flew combat as well as training missions in Soviet-supplied MIGs for the People's Democratic Republic of Yemen (PDRY) during active phases of that country's conflict with North Yemen".

== Aftermath ==
=== Cairo Agreement of 1972 ===
The fighting was short-lived; the war ended 23 days later, on 19 October, by a ceasefire. This was followed by the Cairo Agreement of 28 October, which put forward a plan to unify the two countries in a "republican, national and democratic" state, based on "free and direct" elections.

=== Hostilities in late 1970s ===
South Yemen instigated and funded a broad-based opposition movement in the north, the National Democratic Front (NDF), during the mid-1970s.

== See also ==
- NDF Rebellion
- Second Yemenite War
- Modern history of Yemen
- List of wars involving Yemen
