= Madinat ash Sha'b =

Madinat ash Sha'b مدينة الشعب Al-Ittihad
- Location within Yemen
- Coordinates: 12.837°N 44.929°E
- Country: Yemen
- Governorate: Aden Governorate

Madinat ash Sha'b or Madinat ash Shaab (Note: also Madinat ash Shab, Madinat al Shaab, Madinat Asha'ab etc.) (Arabic: مدينة الشعب, romanized: Madīnat al-Shaʿb) formerly called Al-Ittihad (Arabic: الاتحاد, romanized: Al-Ittiḥād, meaning "union" or "unity"), is a suburb of Aden in the Al Buraiqah district of Aden Governorate, Yemen. Madinat ash Sha'b was founded in 1959 as Al-Ittihād, the first capital of the British Federation of the Emirates of South Arabia.
