= Yemen Renaissance Movement =

Centrist political party

Yemen Renaissance Movement تيار نهضة اليمن
- Abbreviation: YRM
- General Secretary: Muhammad al-Humaydi
- Founded: 21 February 2020
- Ideology: Big tent Yemeni unity Economic liberalism Anti-Zionism
- Political position: Center
- Colours: Black
- House of Representatives: 0 / 301

Website
- https://yemenrm.net/

The Yemen Renaissance Movement (Arabic: تيار نهضة اليمن, Tayyār Nahḍah al-Yaman), is a centrist political party in Yemen. The party was founded on 21 February 2020 by a group of Yemeni academics, intellectuals, activists and media specialists both in Yemen and in the diaspora. Its main objective is the "restoration of the Yemeni state" under republican principles, ensuring amongst others national unity, democracy and rule of law, a federal state and equal rights for all citizens. Furthermore, it supports the reestablishment of an unified army. The diaspora played an important role in the creation of the party and it is described as a party of the cultural and academic elite of the country. The party distances itself from "ideological politization", placing itself in a purportedly "unideologic" center of the political spectrum.

== History ==
On 22 September 2020, the party held a conference for the foundation of the branch in Hadhramaut. During the conference, the party's co-chair Muhammad Haydarah said that they reject all forms of foreign meddling in the country's affairs, pointing to the undermining of national authority in the ports of Al Ghaydah, Aden and Socotra without naming actors specifically. In the conference, he also said that the party is preparing to take Human Rights violations by militias in the country to the International Court of Justice.

Twelve days later, the party organized another conference for the foundation of the branch in Ta'izz. Speakers at the conference emphasized the party's patriotic principles, influenced by the country's republican struggle, as well as the opposition to the Houthis, which was accused of terrorism and aiming to establish an Imamate. Ali as-Sarari, a member of the party's supreme body, called on all parties to put aside differences and unite to support legitimacy and reconstruction of the institutions as well as the state as a federal body.

On 15 October 2022, the party held a ceremony celebrating the 1962 Yemeni Revolution, drawing an analogy from the struggle against the Mutawakkilite Kingdom of Yemen to the struggle against the Houthis. Rashad al-Alimi, leader of the Presidential Leadership Council, was present during the ceremony.

On 25 October 2022, the party's general secretary Muhammad al-Humaydi said that the current threats to the country require all political, tribal, social and cultural forces to support the Presidential Leadership Council and that Rashad al-Alimi has an "integral vision" to overcome the difficult and complex situation.

== See also ==
- List of political parties in Yemen
