= National Solidarity Party (Yemen) =

Centrist political party

National Solidarity Party حزب التضامن الوطني
- Abbreviation: Tadhamon
- Chairman: Abdullah an-Numani
- Founded: 24 November 2012
- Headquarters: Sana'a
- Ideology: Centrism; Yemeni nationalism
- Political position: Center
- Colours: Light green
- House of Representatives: 0 / 301

The National Solidarity Party (Arabic: حزب التضامن الوطني, Ḥizb al-Taḍāmun al-Watanī), is a centrist political party in Yemen. It was founded on 24 November 2012, where the founding committee chose Sheikh Husayn bin Abdullah al-Ahmar as president and chairman. Husayn is the son of al-Islah's leader Abdullah ibn Husayn al-Ahmar and had left the governing General People's Congress on 26 February 2011. In 2016, he was named as presidential advisor to Abdrabbuh Mansur Hadi. The party was joined by some opposition activists and an unspecified number of members of parliament. At the founding conference in March 2013, Sadiq al-Ahmar, the leader of the Hashid tribal confederation, held a speech in which he blessed the founding of the party. Several other ministers and advisors were present at the conference as well. The leader Husayn was a prominent Sheikh of the Hashid tribal confederation and one of the first to oppose the Houthi movement. On 4 April 2015, the Houthis stormed and searched the party's headquarters in ar-Rabat street in Sana'a. On 5 September 2016, president Abdrabbuh Mansur Hadi met with the party to discuss the developments in the country, such as steps towards peace and the hardships brought by the war, which both sides made the Houthis responsible for.

Husayn Abdullah al-Ahmar, the party's founder and chairman died on 27 March 2022 while being in Turkey, likely by a stroke. Husayns father, al-Islah's leader Abdullah ibn Husayn al-Ahmar, was welcoming mourners at his house the following day. The party's current chairman who followed Husayn is Abdullah an-Nu'mani.

== Positions ==
In the meeting of the founding committee, the party committed to the principles of the September revolution and Islamic law. It also stated to seek to create a balance between the different political poles of the country and supports points like a fast and independent justice system, reform of the ineffective administration, the promotion of the role of women in society and the fight against corruption. In the first conference a few months later, al-Ahmar stressed that the party supports the creation of a modern civil state shaped by order, justice and equality.

The party fiercely opposes the Houthi movement, calling it a sectarian and racist tendency and declared solidarity with Al-Islah on its 32nd anniversary, calling it a solid republican wall against the "Houthi-Imamate" that sacrificed thousands in the fight against them.

== See also ==
- List of political parties in Yemen
