= Alawi Sheikhdom =

Sheikhdom which was located in the Aden region of Southwestern Yemen

Coordinates: 13.468°N 44.656°E

‘Alawi Sheikhdom مشيخة العلوي
- State of the Federation of South Arabia
- unknown–1967
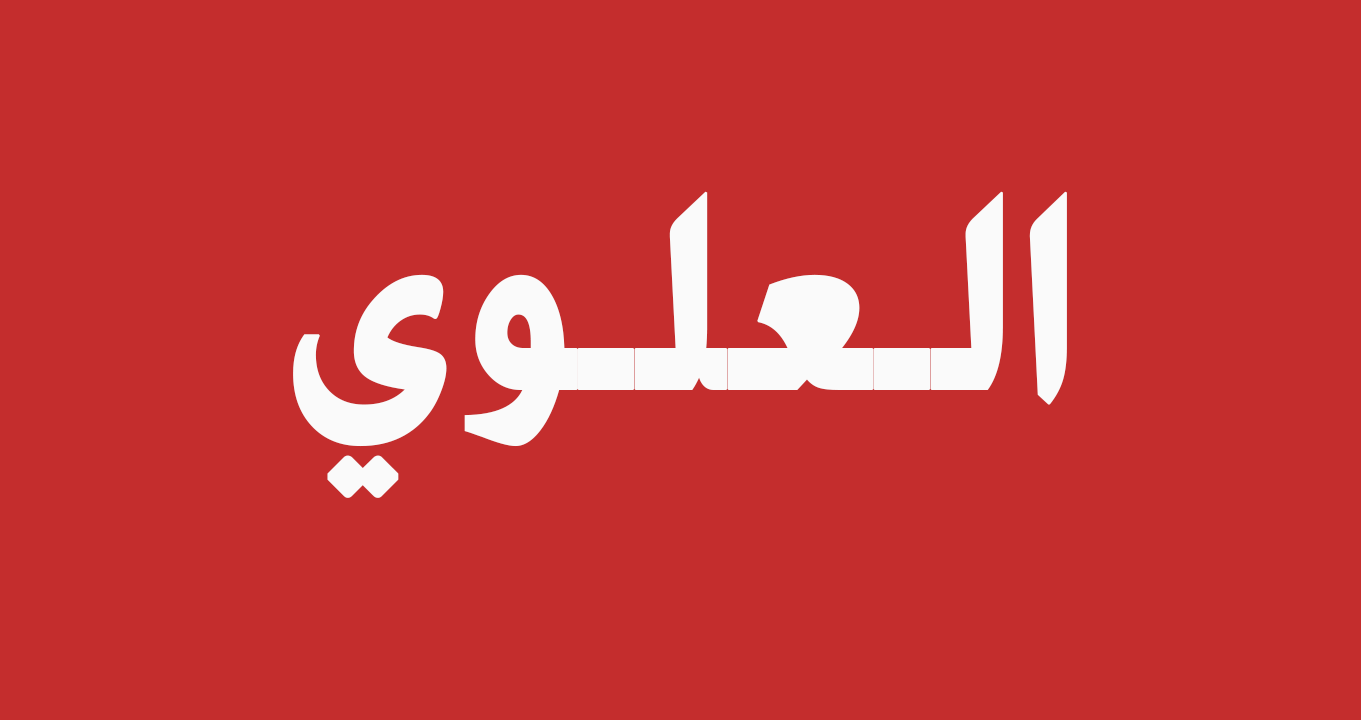
- Flag

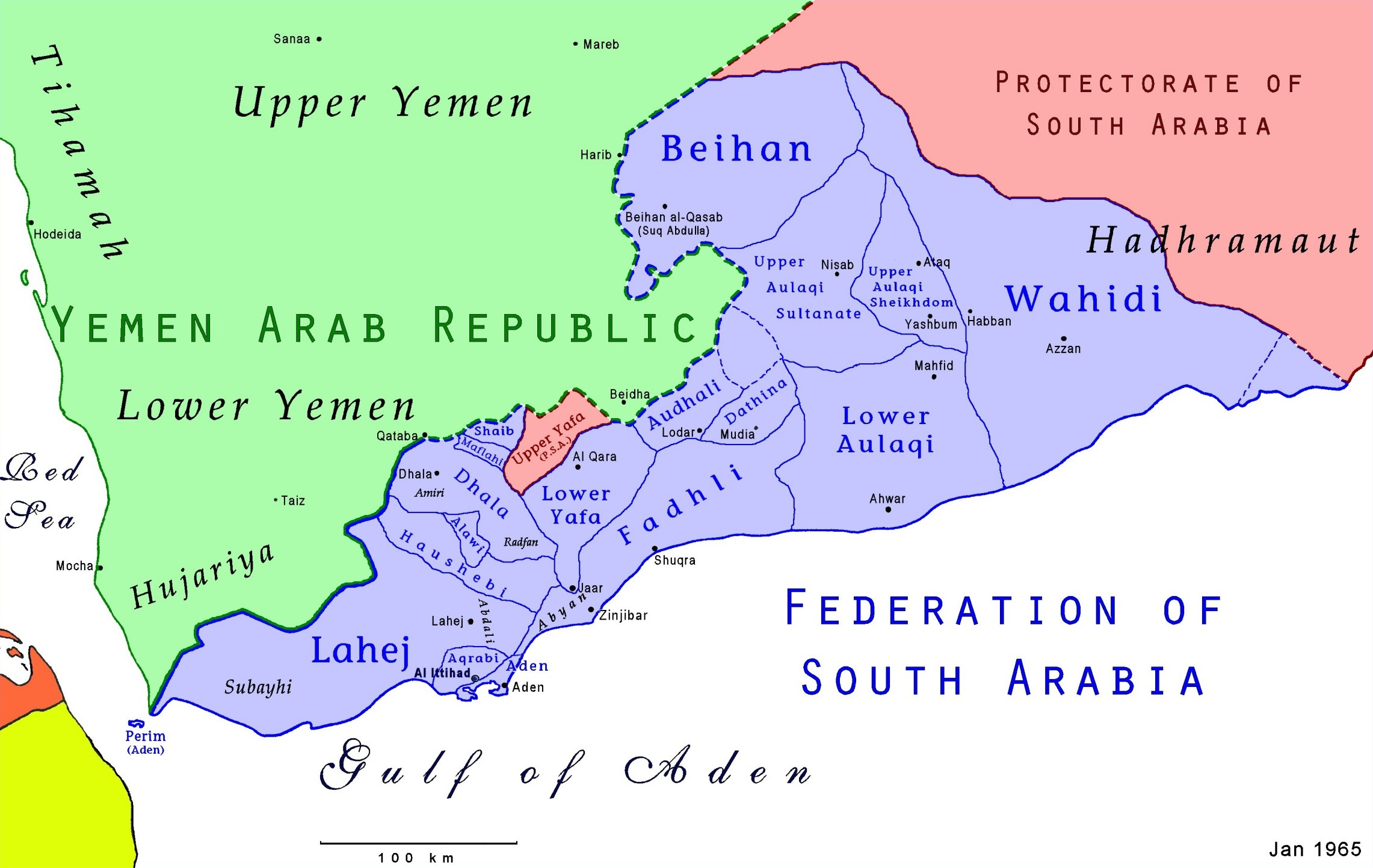
- Map of the Federation of South Arabia
- Capital: Al Qasha
- Population
  - 1917: Less than 1,500
  - Type: Sheikhdom
- Historical era: 20th century
  - Established: unknown
  - Disestablished: 1967
| Preceded by | Succeeded by |
| Federation of Arab Emirates of the South | South Yemen |

The Alawi Sheikhdom (Arabic: مشيخة العلوي Mashyakhat al-‘Alawī), or Alawi (Arabic: علوي ‘Alawī) — was a Sheikhdom located in the Aden region of southwestern Yemen. Its capital was Al Qasha. The state was abolished in 1967 with the independence of the People's Republic of South Yemen.

== History ==
No separate engagement was entered into with the Alawi after the British capture of Aden, but the Shaikh's stipend was secured through the intervention of Sultan Mana bin Salam of the Haushabi.

Shaikh Seif bin Shaif died in March 1875, and was succeeded by his nephew, Said bin Salih. The latter died on 1 April 1892 and his eldest son, Shaikh Seif bin Said, was elected to the chiefship and was recognised by Government. The annual stipend of 60 dollars paid to the late Shaikh was continued to his successor.

In 1888, Shaikh Said bin Salih signed an Agreement in conjunction with the Haushabi, Quteibi and the Amiri fixing the rates to he levied on merchandise.

On 16 July 1895, a Protectorate Treaty was concluded with the Alawi Shaikh.

In April 1898, Shaikh Seif bin Said was deposed by his tribe. His cousin, Husein bin Salih, was elected Shaikh, but died the same year and was succeeded by Shaikh Ali Nasir Shaif, to whom the usual stipend was continued.

In 1904–1906, The Alawi Shaikh remained loyal to the British Government. He was given assistance to build a fort at Hamra, where the Quteibi had held sway prior to the advent of the British.

The Alawi-Quteibi relations had never been good. The chief hone of contention is the existence of co-rights in the village of Thumeir close to Suleik. The Alawi Shaikh has a custom house and he is thus able to forego the levy of transit dues on the people of Thumeir in consideration of which they pay him revenue, whereas the power of the Quteibi suffers from their having no right to levy dues.

In September 1907, shortly before the withdrawal of the Political Agent, Dhala, the Alawi fort at Al Hamra and the Quteibi fort at Tain were both razed to the ground, as a means of avoiding, as far as possible, any renewal of hostilities between the tribes; but hardly had this been done when the Alawi Shaikh endeavoured to re-erect a fort in the vicinity of the demolished fort at Al Hamra. This and other acts of hostility naturally brought about retaliation by the Quteibi. Having assembled the Radfan tribes and received help from the Amir of Dhala, whose suzerainty he acknowledges when convenient, the Quteibi Shaikh fell upon and defeated the Alawi Shaikh, and dispossessed him of his territory. The Alawi Shaikh fled to Lahej. The Quteibi Shaikh, who had lost two of his sons in the fighting, at first refused to come to terms with the Alawi, but a settlement was later effected by the Abdali Sultan, by which the whole of the Alawi Shaikh's country was restored to him.

In 1914, the Alawi Shaikh Ali Nasir signed an agreement practically identical with that signed about the same time by the Haushabi Sultan, for the safety of trade routes in his territory. The agreement has not been ratified. Under the terms of this agreement the Alawi Shaikh was granted a monthly payment of 25 dollars in addition to his stipend and agreed to keep a force of 20 men and to maintain a post at Al Jimil. After the agreement was signed the post of Al Jimil was demolished and Al Jimil itself passed into the hands of the Quteibi.

In July 1920, Shaikh Ali Nasir died and was succeeded by his eldest son, Shaikh Abdun Nabi, to whom the payment of the stipend was continued.

In April 1923, Shaikh Abdun Nabi was arrested in his own country and taken to Nadira by a party of Imamic soldiers from Dhala. In spite of the protests sent to the Imam by the Resident at Aden, the Shaikh was detained till November 1924, when he was allowed to return to his country, which the Imam later occupied. In February 1928 Shaikh Abdun Nabi, with Shaikh Muqbil Abdulla, uncle of the Quteibi Shaikh, was kidnapped at the instigation of the Imamic authorities. They were subsequently released as a result of air action taken by His Majesty's Government against the Zeidi forces of occupation, and the Imam's troops in Alawi territory were expelled in July 1928.

In the 1960s, it was in the Federation of Arab Emirates of the South, and its successor, the Federation of South Arabia. The last sheikh, Salih ibn Sayil Al Alawi, was deposed and his state was abolished on 28 Aug 1967 upon the founding of the communist-led People's Republic of South Yemen (1967-1990).

Since 1990, the area is part of the Republic of Yemen.

=== Rulers ===
The rulers of the `Alawi Sheikhdom had the style of Shaykh al-Mashyakha al-`Alawiyya.

==== Sheikhs ====
- 1800 - 1839 Sha'if al-`Alawi
- 1839 - 18.. Hilal ibn Sha´if al-`Alawi
- 18.. - Mar 1875 Sha´if ibn Sha´if al-`Alawi
- 1875 - 1892 Sa`id ibn Salih al-`Alawi
- 1892 - Apr 1898 Sha´if ibn Sa`id al-`Alawi
- 1898 al-Husayn ibn Salih al-`Alawi
- 1898 - Jul 1920 `Ali ibn Nasir al-`Alawi
- 1920 - 1925 `Abd al-Nabi ibn `Ali al-`Alawi
- 1925 - 1940 Muhsin ibn `Ali al-`Alawi
- 1940 - 28 Aug 1967 Salih ibn Sayil al-`Alawi

== See also ==
- Aden Protectorate
