= NDF Rebellion =

1978–1982 uprising in North Yemen by the National Democratic Front

- Part of the Cold War and the Arab Cold War
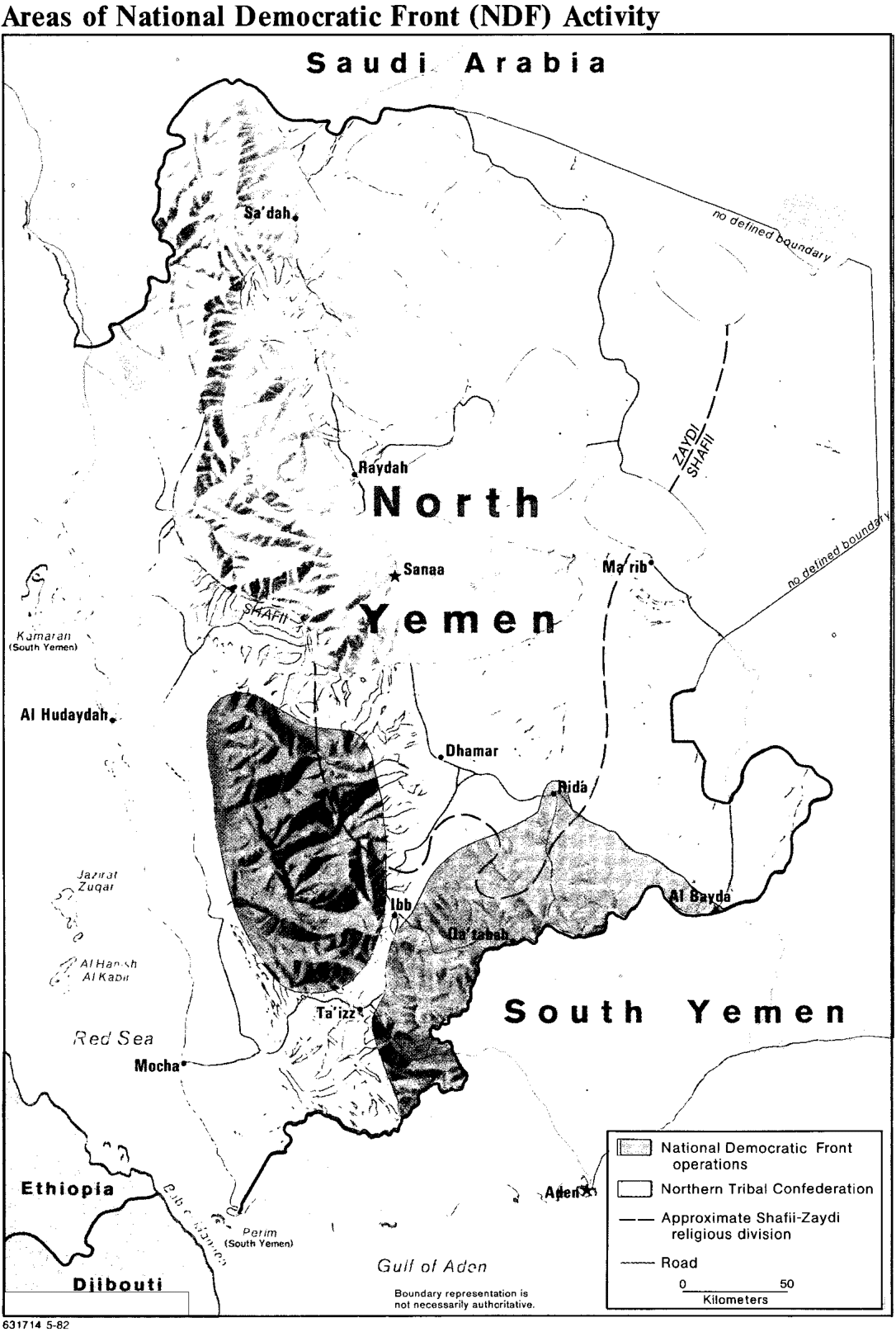
- CIA map of the NDF area of operations in May 1982
Date	1978 – 1982 (4 years)
Location	Central Yemen Arab Republic
Result	Government victory

Belligerents
National Democratic Front; Revolutionary Democratic Party of Yemen; Organisation of Yemeni Revolutionary Resistors; Popular Vanguard; Labour Party; Popular Democratic Union; Supported by: South Yemen; Libya	North Yemen; Republic of China; Islamic Front; Supported by: United States

Commanders and leaders
Yahya Shami; Sultan Ahmad Umar; Jarallah Omar (South Yemen) Abdul Fattah Ismail	(Yemen Arab Republic) Ali Abdullah Saleh (Yemen Arab Republic) Ali Mohsen al-Ahmar

Strength
	United States 400 advisers; Republic of China 80 ROCAF pilots plus ground and air defense crews; 15000

The NDF Rebellion, also known as the Central Regions war (Arabic: حرب المناطق الوسطى), was an uprising and civil war in the Yemen Arab Republic (North Yemen) by the National Democratic Front, under Yahya Shami, between 1978 and 1982.

== History ==
=== Beginning of the rebellion ===
The rebellion began in 1978, following the assassination of Ahmad al-Ghashmi and the rise of Ali Abdullah Saleh. The National Democratic Front (NDF) was supported in its rebellion by South Yemen and Libya. The NDF enjoyed various successes throughout the early phases of the conflict, although its foreign support dwindled after the peace treaty between North and South Yemen following the 1979 border war.

There were several attempts at ceasefires between the government and the NDF. Kuwait managed to facilitate the signing of a ceasefire between the government and the NDF on 26 November 1981, although hostilities re-erupted in December 1981. Later, the Palestinian Liberation Organization (PLO) was able to mediate a ceasefire agreement on 3 April 1982, but hostilities began again later that same month, with the NDF capturing Juban. Government forces in turn attacked NDF positions in Juban in the following month and retook the territory.

=== May 1982 and the defeat of the rebellion ===
South Yemeni support for the NDF diminished under the presidency of the less overtly militant Ali Nasir Muhammad, and their support for the NDF finally ended in May 1982. Dhamar, a major NDF stronghold, sustained major damage during the 1982 North Yemen earthquake. The NDF was eventually defeated by a reorganized North Yemeni Army in conjunction with the pro-government Islamic Front, allowing the North Yemeni government to finally establish control over the North-South border region.

== See also ==
- List of wars involving Yemen
