= Upper Aulaqi Sheikhdom =

Former country

Coordinates: 14.30°N 46.50°E

Upper Aulaqi Sheikhdom مشيخة العوالق العليا
- State of the Federation of South Arabia
- 18th century–1967
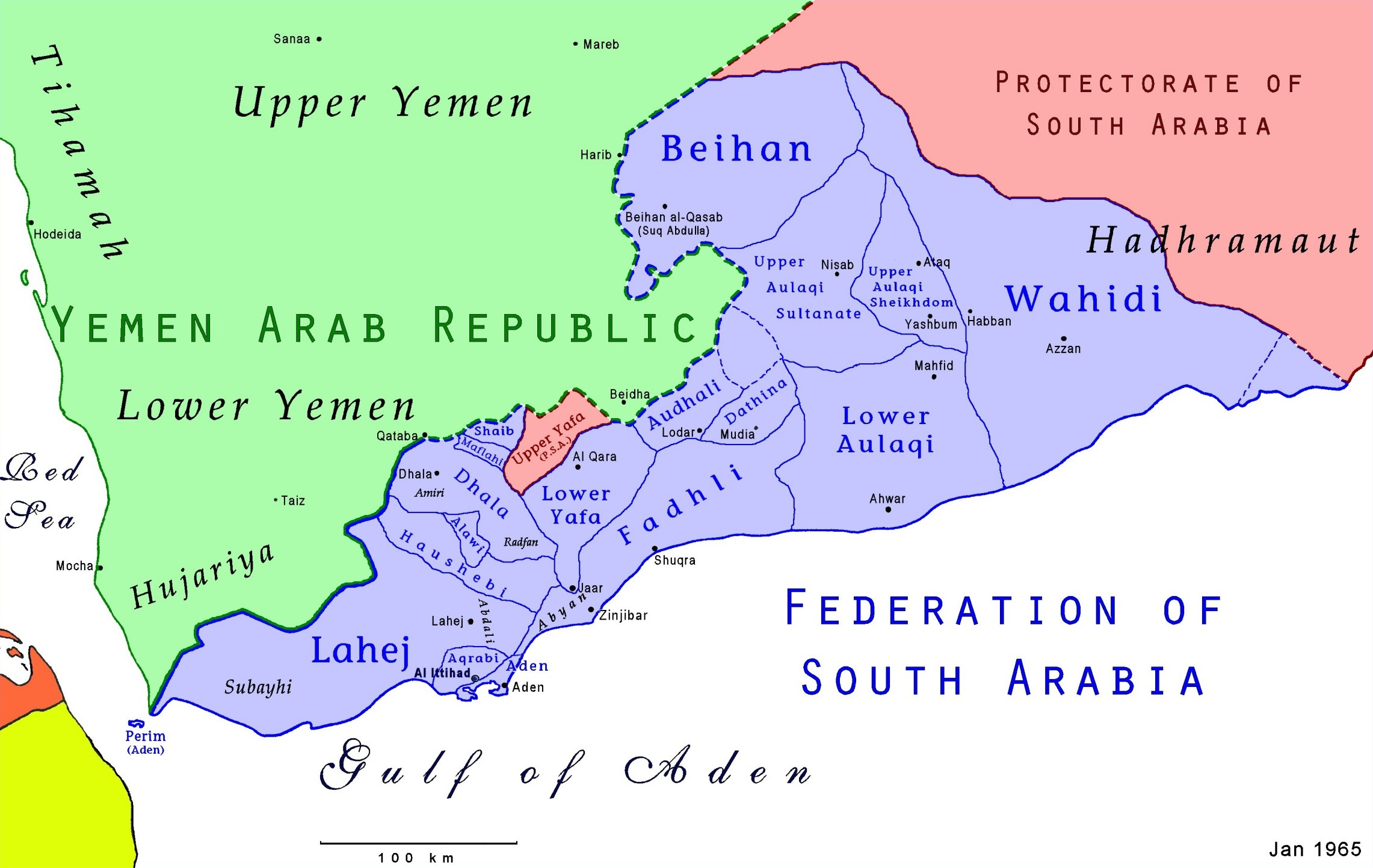
- Map of the Federation of South Arabia
- Capital: Sa'id
  - Type: Sheikhdom
- Historical era: 20th century
  - Established: 18th century
  - Disestablished: 1967
Preceded by	Succeeded by
Federation of Arab Emirates of the South	South Yemen

The Upper Aulaqi Sheikhdom (Arabic: مشيخة العوالق العليا, romanized: Mashyakhat al-‘Awālaq al-‘Ulyā) was a state in the British Aden Protectorate, the Federation of Arab Emirates of the South, and its successor, the Federation of South Arabia. Its capital was Sa'id. The area of the former state is now the central part of the Shabwah Governorate of the Republic of Yemen.

== History ==
The Lower Aulaqi sultans separated from the Upper Aulaqi in the 18th century and the Upper Aulaqi sheikhs of Said made themselves gradually independent from the Upper Aulaqi Sultanate of Nisab during the same period.

Shaikh Farid bin Nasir died on 2 June 1883 and was succeeded by his eldest son Ruweis.

Ruweis was deposed by his tribesmen in 1890 and was succeeded by his brother Um Rasas bin Farid, who died in July 1902 and was succeeded by his brother the present Shaikh, Muhsin bin Farid.

In 1889 the Upper Aulaqi Shaikh voluntarily signed an agreement abandoning all customary rights over the Fadhli and Abdali.

On 8 December 1903 a treaty was concluded at Aden with the Upper Aulaqi Shaikh and was ratified on 5 February 1904.

In October 1918 Shaikh Yeslam Barweis, son of the late Upper Aulaqi Shaikh received a Commission in the 1st Yemen Infantry as Yuzbashi in which he remained till its disbandment in March 1925. On the raising of the Aden Protectorate Levies in April 1928 he became Senior Arab Officer and remained so until his death in September 1929.

In 1931, the population of this tribe was estimated at 30,000.

It was a founding member of the Federation of Arab Emirates of the South in 1959 and its successor, the Federation of South Arabia, in 1963.

The last sheikh, Amir Abd Allah ibn Muhsin al Yaslami Al Aulaqi, was deposed on 28 August 1967 and his state was abolished in November 1967 upon the founding of the People's Republic of South Yemen.

=== Rulers ===
The rulers of the Upper Aulaqi Sheikhdom bore the title Shaykh al-Mashyakha al-`Awlaqiyya al-`Ulya.

==== Sheikhs ====
- ..... - .... Amir Daha
- .... - .... Amir Yaslam ibn Daha
- .... - .... Amir `Ali ibn Yaslam
- .... - .... Amir `Amm Dayb ibn `Ali al-Yaslami al-`Awlaqi
- .... - .... Amir Ruways ibn `Amm Dayb al-Yaslami al-`Awlaqi
- .... - .... Amir Nasir ibn Ruways al-Yaslami al-`Awlaqi
- 1871? - 2 Jun 1883 Amir Farid ibn Nasir al-Yaslami al-`Awlaqi
- 1883 - 1890 Amir Ruways ibn Farid al-Yaslami al-`Awlaqi
- 1890 - Jul 1902 Amir `Amm Rassas ibn Farid al-Yaslami al-`Awlaqi
- 1902 - 1959 Amir Muhsin ibn Farid al-Yaslami al-`Awlaqi
- 1959 - 28 Aug 1967 Amir `Abd Allah ibn Muhsin al-Yaslami al-`Awlaqi

== See also ==
- Upper Aulaqi Sultanate
- Aden Protectorate
