= Lower Aulaqi Sultanate =

Coordinates: 13.31°N 46.42°E

Lower Aulaqi Sultanate سلطنة العوالق السفلى
- State of the Federation of South Arabia
- 18th century–1967
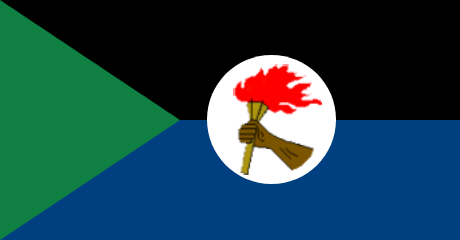
- Flag

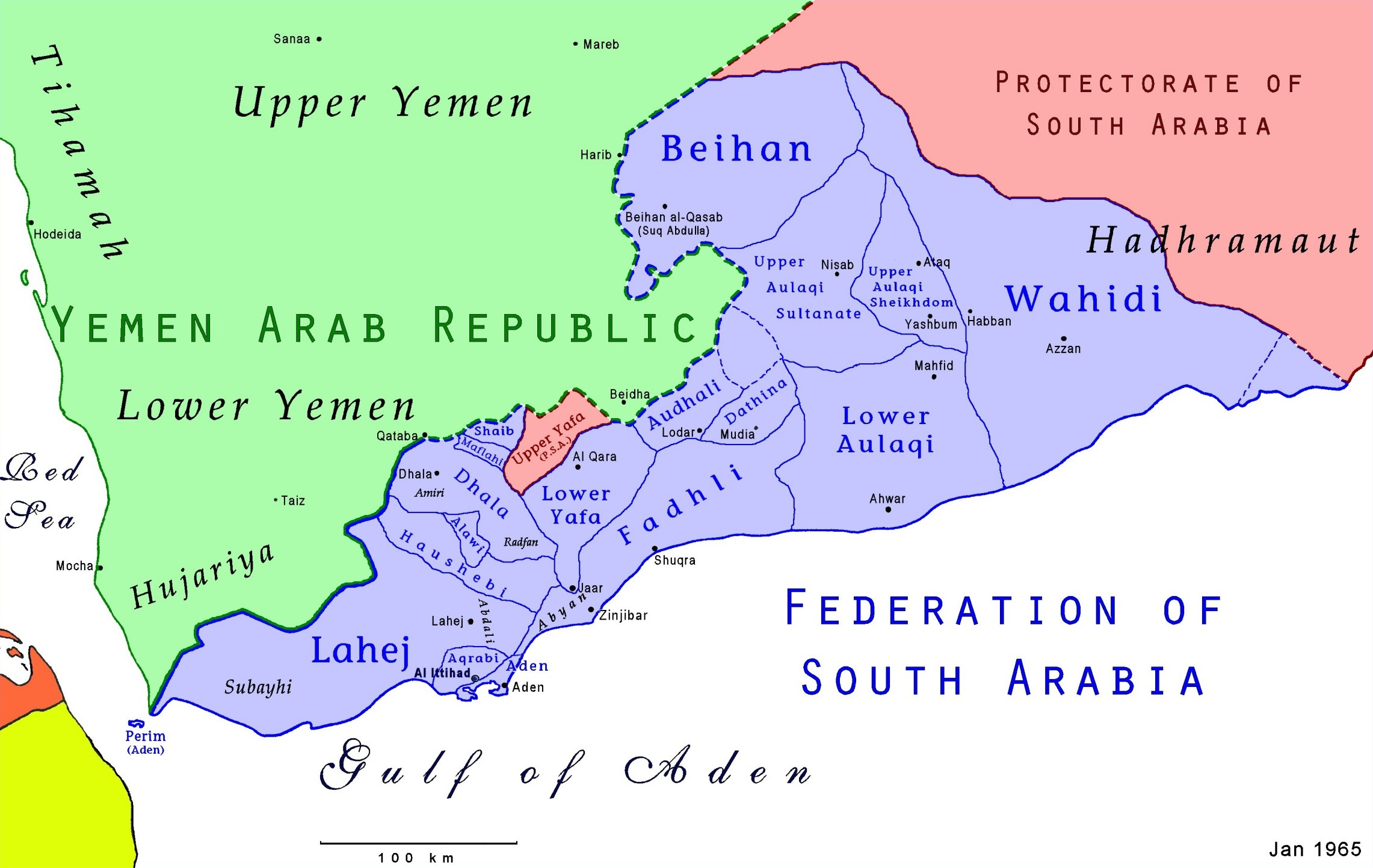
- Map of the Federation of South Arabia
- Capital: Ahwar
  - Type: Sultanate
- Historical era: 20th century
  - Established: 18th century
  - Disestablished: 1967
Preceded by	Succeeded by
Federation of Arab Emirates of the South	South Yemen

Lower Aulaqi (Arabic: العوالق السفلى al-‘Awālaq as-Suflá), or the Lower Aulaqi Sultanate (Arabic: سلطنة العوالق السفلى Salṭanat al-‘Awālaq al-Suflá), was a state in the Aden Protectorate, the Federation of Arab Emirates of the South, and its successor, the Federation of South Arabia. Its capital was Ahwar.

== History ==
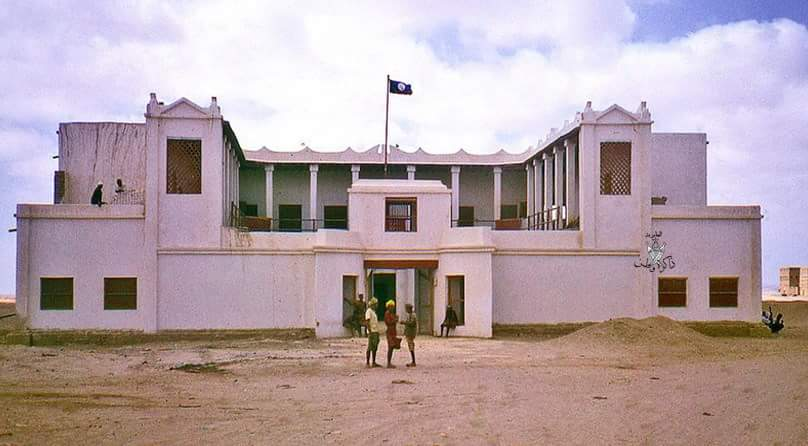
Fort in Ahwar with the flag of Lower Aulaqi on top if it

The Lower Aulaqi sultans separated from the Upper Aulaqi Sultanate in the 18th century (Upper Aulaqi Sheikhdom separated around the same time).

In October 1855 the Resident at Aden entered into an Engagement with Sultan Munassar bin Bubakar bin Mehdi of the Lower Aulaqi tribe, by which the latter bound himself to prohibit the importation of slaves into the country from Africa. He was murdered, together with his son Abdulla, in July 1863, and was succeeded by his cousin, Bubakar bin Abdulla. The authority of the Lower Aulaqi Sultan, over his tribe was rather limited, and Sultan Bubakar bin Abdulla was not always able to prevent the plunder of vessels wrecked on his coast. In 1871, however, he bound himself by an engagement to use his best endeavours to prevent such outrages in future, and to protect, and if possible convey to Aden, any shipwrecked seamen who might stand in need of his assistance.

In 1883 dissensions broke out between the Fadhli and Lower Aulaqi, leading to a raid on Fadhli territory. The Lower Aulaqi were defeated with considerable loss.

A Protectorate Treaty concluded between the British and the Sultan in 1888, and was ratified on 26 February 1890.

In 1892 Sultan Bubakar resigned the chiefship in favour of Salih bin Ali bin Nasir, a distant relative. The Government sanctioned this arrangement and continued his stipend to his successor. Sultan Salih bin Ali bin Nasir resigned the chiefship in 1900, and Sultan Ali bin Munassar succeeded him. The latter died in 1902 and was succeeded by Sultan Nasir bin Bubakar.

In 1904 some Fadhli tribesmen fired on a Lower Aulaqi dhow, and in consequence the old feud between the two tribes broke out again. There was little actual fighting, and at the end of the year a truce was proclaimed.

In 1912 Sultan Hasir bin Bubakar died. He was succeeded by Sultan Bubakar bin Nasir.

In 1924 Sultan Bubakar abdicated in favour of his cousin, Munassar bin Ali. He was recognised by His Majesty’s Government as the ruling chief of the Lower Aulaqi tribe, and the payment of the usual annual stipend was continued to him.

In June 1929 a Greek ship, the Hermes, ran out of coal and went ashore about 25 miles north-east of Ahwar. The Lower Aulaqi Sultan carried out the terms of his salvage treaty satisfactorily.

In April 1930 Sultan Munassar bin Ali died. As of December 1930, no successor had been elected owing to family dissensions.

In 1931, the population of the Lower Aulaqi was estimated at 15,000, and the gross revenue at Rs. 10,000 a year.

The sultanate joined the Federation of Arab Emirates of the South in February 1960 and the Federation of South Arabia in January 1963.

The Sultanate was abolished in 1967 and the last sultan, Nasir ibn Aidrus Al Awlaqi along with Prince Ali Abdullah the Governor, were imprisoned upon the founding of the People's Republic of South Yemen. The area is now part of the Republic of Yemen.

=== Rulers ===
The ruler of the Lower Aulaqi Sultanate bore the title Sultan al-Saltana al-`Awlaqiyya al-Sufla.

==== Sultans ====
- .... - .... `Ali ibn Munassar al-`Awlaqi
- .... - .... al-Mahdi ibn `Ali al-`Awlaqi
- .... - .... `Ali ibn al-Mahdi al-`Awlaqi
- .... - .... `Abd Allah ibn `Ali al-`Awlaqi
- .... - .... Nasir ibn Abi Bakr al-`Awlaqi
- 1855? - Jul 1863 Munassar ibn Abi Bakr al-`Awlaqi
- 1863 - 1892 Abu Bakr ibn `Abd Allah al-`Awlaqi
- 1892 - 1900 Salih ibn `Ali al-`Awlaqi
- 1900 - 5 Dec 1902 `Ali ibn Munassar al-`Awlaqi
- 6 Dec 1902 - 1912 Nasir ibn Abi Bakr al-`Awlaqi
- 1912 - 1924 Abu Bakr ibn Nasir al-`Awlaqi
- 1924 - Apr 1930 Munassar ibn `Ali al-`Awlaqi
- 1930 - 1947 `Aydarus ibn `Ali al-`Awlaqi
- 1947 - 29 Nov 1967 Nasir ibn `Aydarus al-`Awlaqi

== See also ==
- Upper Aulaqi Sheikhdom
- Upper Aulaqi Sultanate
- Aden Protectorate
