= Yafai =

Origin
- Language: Arabic

Yafai is an Arabic-language surname. Notable people with the surname include:

- Galal Yafai (born 1992), British Olympic gold medallist amateur boxer, brother of Gamal and Khalid.
- Gamal Yafai (born 1991), English professional boxer, brother of Galal and Khalid
- Khalid Yafai (born 1989), British professional boxer, brother of Gamal and Galal
