= Yemeni Labour Party =

Social democratic political party in Yemen

Yemeni Labour Party حزب العمل اليمن
- General secretary: Mukhtar al-Qushaybi
- Founded: 2013
- Ideology: Social democracy
- Political position: Center-left
- International affiliation: Socialist International; Progressive Alliance
- Colours: Red
- House of Representatives: 0 / 301

The Yemeni Labour Party (Arabic: حزب العمل اليمن, Ḥizb al-'Amil al-Yamanī) is a social democratic political party in Yemen. It was founded on June 20, 2013, in the capital Sanaa and is led by Mukhtar al-Qushaybi. The party denounced the Saudi Arabian–led intervention in Yemen, calling it an act of aggression, and renewed their support for the Houthi takeover in 2020, referring to it as the "September 21 Revolution".

On 13 June 2017, the party's general secretary, Sheikh Mukhtar al-Qushaybi was arrested by the Houthis and detained without charges until 10 April 2020, when he was put before the public prosecutor's office after public pressure for his release. After interrogation, al-Qushaybi claimed the public prosecutor decided to release him, but revised that decision later. On 20 October 2020, al-Qushaybi went into a hunger strike, demanding his release and accountability of those who put him under arrest.

== See also ==
- List of political parties in Yemen
