= Kuhal =

Kuhal is a village in the north eastern region of Rampur Bushahr, Shimla district, Himachal Pradesh, India.

About 50 km from Rampur Bushahar. Shraikoti Temple is situated on top of it . It is a gram Panchayat (GP) and the people of the village are very hardworking. Apple is main cash crop here. The village is well connected to roads. There is an old temple of MAA Durga situated in the middle of village. Wild life Dharanghati is situated near the village where you can see black bears, snow leopard, monal and some other species.
