= Aqrabi =

Coordinates: 12°53′N 44°50′E

‘Aqrabi Sheikhdom مشيخة عقربي
- State of the Federation of South Arabia
- 1770–1967
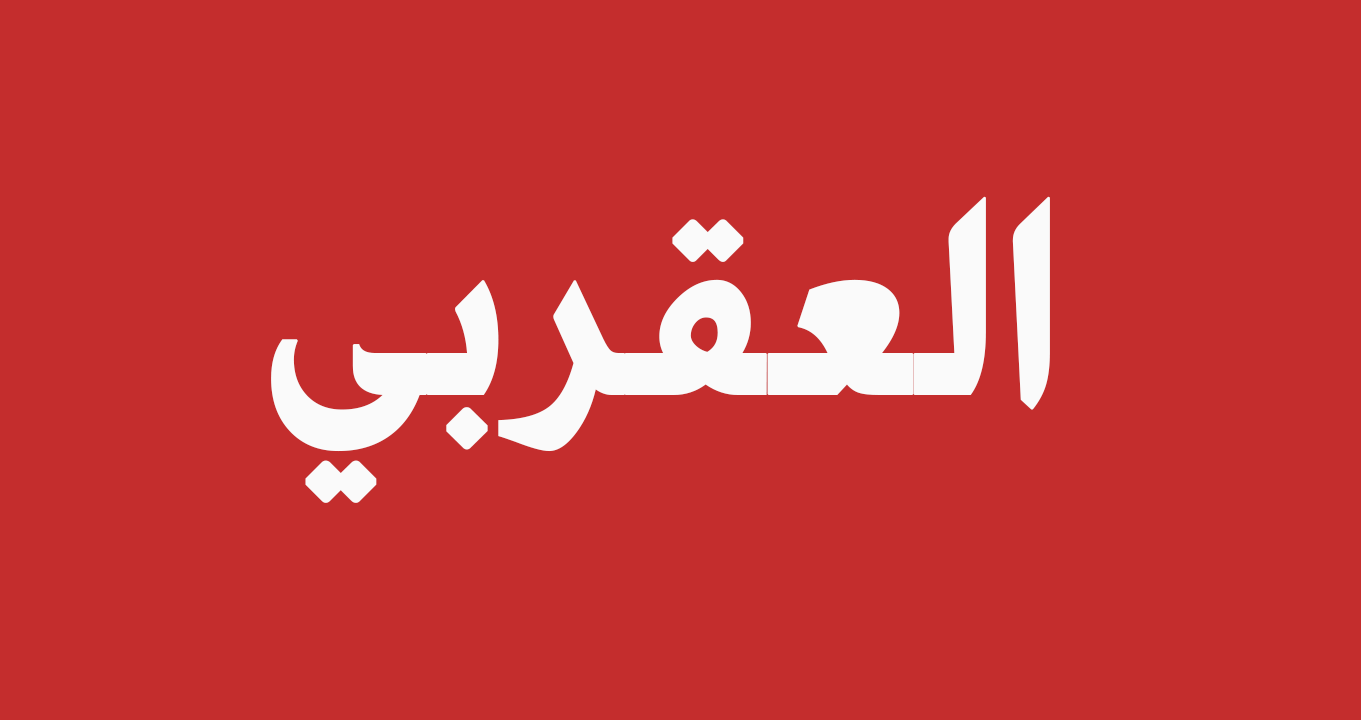
- Flag

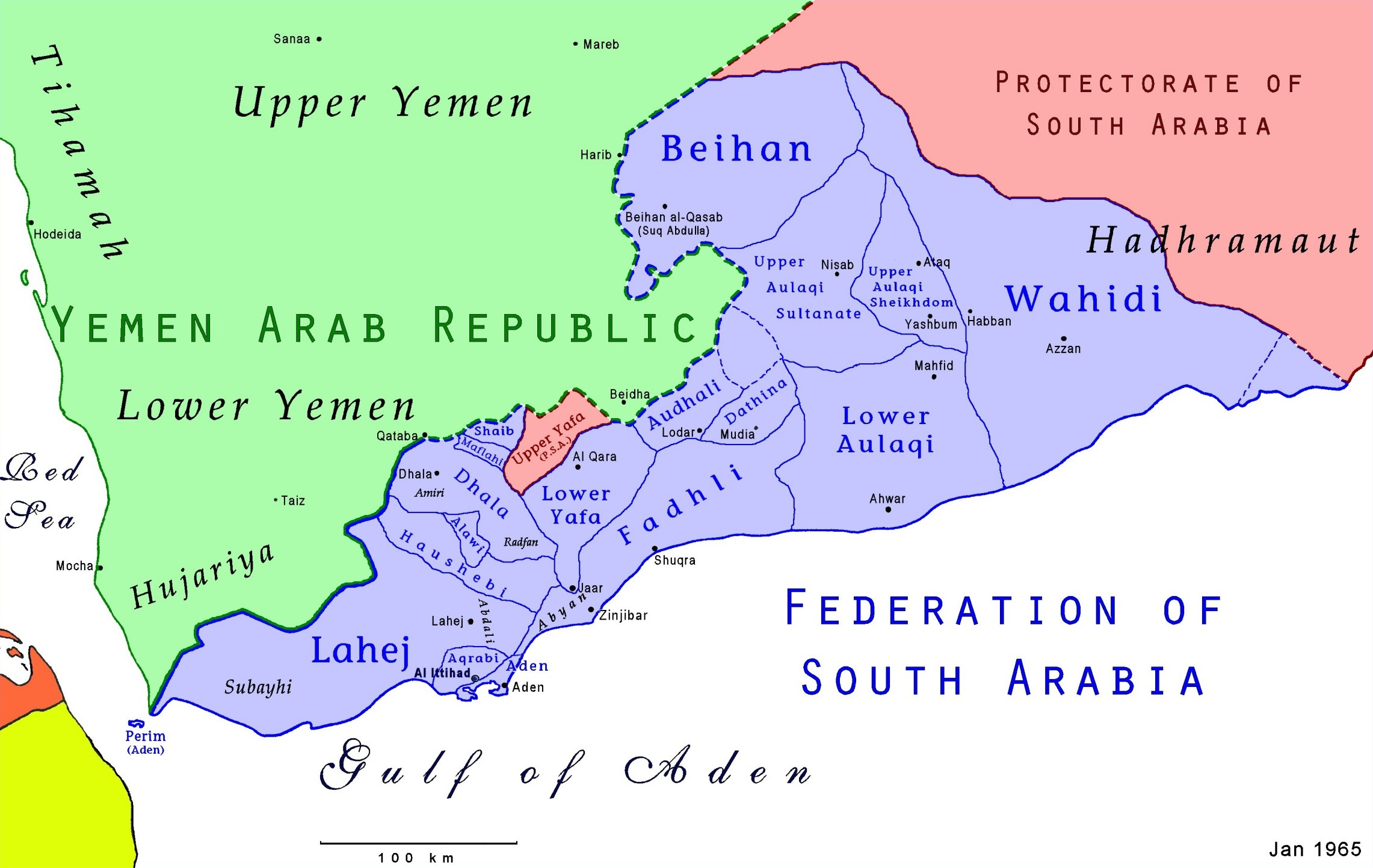
- Map of the Federation of South Arabia
- Capital: Bir Ahmad
- Population
  - 1946: 1,000
  - Type: Sheikhdom
- Historical era: 20th century
  - Established: 1770
  - Disestablished: 1967
Preceded by	Succeeded by
Federation of Arab Emirates of the South	South Yemen

‘Aqrabi (Arabic: عقربي ‘Aqrabī), or the Aqrabi Sheikhdom (Arabic: مشيخة العقربي Mashyakhat al-‘Aqrabī), was a state in the British Aden Protectorate, the Federation of Arab Emirates of the South, and its successor, the Federation of South Arabia. Its capital was Bir Ahmad. The state was abolished in 1967 with the independence of the People's Republic of South Yemen. The area is now part of the Republic of Yemen.

== Geography ==
The Aqrabi inhabited the coast-line from Bir Ahmad to Ras Amran; inland their territory extended to an undefined point between Bir Ahmed and Wahat. Their only town, or rather village, was that of Bir Ahmad.

== History ==
The `Aqrabi sheikhs became independent from the Sultans of Lahej about the year 1770. An engagement was concluded in 1839 with their Shaikh, Haidara Medhi, after the capture of Aden, and it was adhered to until the date of the third attack upon the fortress in July 1840. Thenceforward for many years their attitude was one of hostility. In 1850 they murdered a seaman of the Auckland. This necessitated the blockade of the port of Bir Ahmed, which continued for several years, and friendly relations with the tribe were not resumed till 1857, when the Shaikh of the Aqrabi tribe renewed his professions of peace and good will.

In 1858 Shaikh Haidara Mehdi resigned the Shaikship and was succeeded by his son Abdulla. In 1863 an agreement was made with him, by which he engaged not to sell, mortgage, or give for occupation, save to the British Government, any portion of the peninsula of little Aden. In return he was to receive an immediate payment of 3,000 dollars, and a monthly stipend of 30 dollars.

These terms were not considered entirely satisfactory by Her Majesty s Government, and the Resident was instructed to treat for the complete and unreserved acquisition of the peninsula. After tedious negotiations, which were further protracted by the necessity of investigating the claims of Other tribes to this territory, the purchase was concluded on 2 April 1869 for a sum of 30,000 dollars, the stipend of the Shaikh being at the same time raised to 40 dollars a month.

The animosity, always latent, between the Abdali and Aqrabi, broke out in 1887, and in August of that year the Abdali besieged Bir Ahmed in a desultory fashion. Eventually, as the British limits at Al Hiswa were disturbed, the Resident intervened; the Abdali evacuated Aqrabi territory, and peace was restored on 6 September.

Negotiations were commenced in 1887 for the acquisition of a strip of foreshore to connect the British limits at Al Hiswa and Bandar Fukum. They were brought to a satisfactory conclusion by an agreement, dated 15 July 1888, the Aqrabi Shaikh disposing of his title for an immediate payment, of Rs. 2,000.

In 1888 a Protectorate Treaty was concluded with the Aqrabi, similar to that arranged with several other tribes, and was ratified on 26 February 1890.

Shaikh Abdulla died in March 1905, and was succeeded by his son. Shaikh Fadhl bin Abdulla bin Haidara.

In 1915 the Turkish commander at Lahej sent a Turkish flag to the Aqrabi Shaikh to be flown on his residence. The Shaikh did not do this, but sent it to the Resident at Aden. For this act he was vilified by the Turkish commander, whose letter to the Shaikh was sent by the latter to Aden. Shortly afterwards a party of Turks and their Somali mercenaries surrounded the Shaikh's house in Bir Ahmed and he was taken to Lahej, where he was imprisoned in fetters for about a year, and then released and kept in Lahej under surveillance till the end of the war. The refugees from Aqrabi territory were housed and maintained in Aden until the end of the war.

The Aqrabi Shaikh and his subjects were given a sum of Rs. 24,000 With which to rebuild Bir Ahmed.

As of 1931, Aqrabi's gross annual revenue amounted to about Rs. 2,000. and his tribesmen numbered about 1,000.

The state joined the Federation of Arab Emirates of the South in February 1960 and the Federation of South Arabia in January 1963. The last sheikh, Mahmud ibn Muhammad Al `Aqrabi, was deposed on 28 August 1967 and the sheikhdom was abolished in November 1967 upon the founding of the People's Republic of South Yemen.

=== Rulers ===
The rulers of the Aqrabi Sheikhdom had the style of Shaykh al-Mashyakha al-`Aqrabiyya.

==== Sheikhs ====
- 1770 - 1833 al-Mahdi ibn `Ali al-`Aqrabi
- 1833 - 1858 Haydara ibn al-Mahdi al-`Aqrabi
- 1858 - 8 Mar 1905 `Abd Allah ibn Haydara al-`Aqrabi
- 1905 - 9 Jun 1935 al-Fadl ibn `Abd Allah al-`Aqrabi
- 9 Jun 1935 - 1957 Muhammad ibn al-Fadl al-`Aqrabi
- 1957 - 28 Aug 1967 Mahmud ibn Muhammad al-`Aqrabi

== See also ==
- Aden Protectorate
