= Federation of South Arabia =

1959–67 British protectorate in southwest Arabia

Coordinates: 15.330°N 48.076°E

Federation of South Arabia (1962–1967) اتحاد الجنوب العربي Federation of the Emirates of South Arabia (1959–1962) اتحاد إمارات الجنوب العربي
- 1959–1967
- Top: Flag (1962–1967); Bottom: Flag (1959–1962) Top: Emblem (1962–1967); Bottom: Emblem (1959–1962)

- Status: British protectorate
- Capital: Al-Ittihad
- Common languages: Arabic; English
- Government: Federal union of protectorates
- High Commissioner
  - 1963: Sir Charles Johnston
  - 1963–1964: Sir Kennedy Trevaskis
  - 1964–1967: Sir Richard Turnbull
  - 1967: Sir Humphrey Trevelyan
- Chief Minister
  - 1963: Hassan Ali Bayumi
  - 1963–1965: Zayn Abdu Baharun
  - 1965: Abdul-Qawi Hassan Makkawi
  - 1965–1966: Ali Musa al-Babakr
  - 1966–1967: Salih al-Awadli
- Historical era: Cold War
  - Established: 11 February 1959
  - Independence: 30 November 1967
- Currency: East African shilling (until 1 April 1965); South Arabian dinar
Preceded by
Aden Protectorate
Colony of Aden
Upper Aulaqi Sultanate
Succeeded by
South Yemen
- Today part of: Yemen

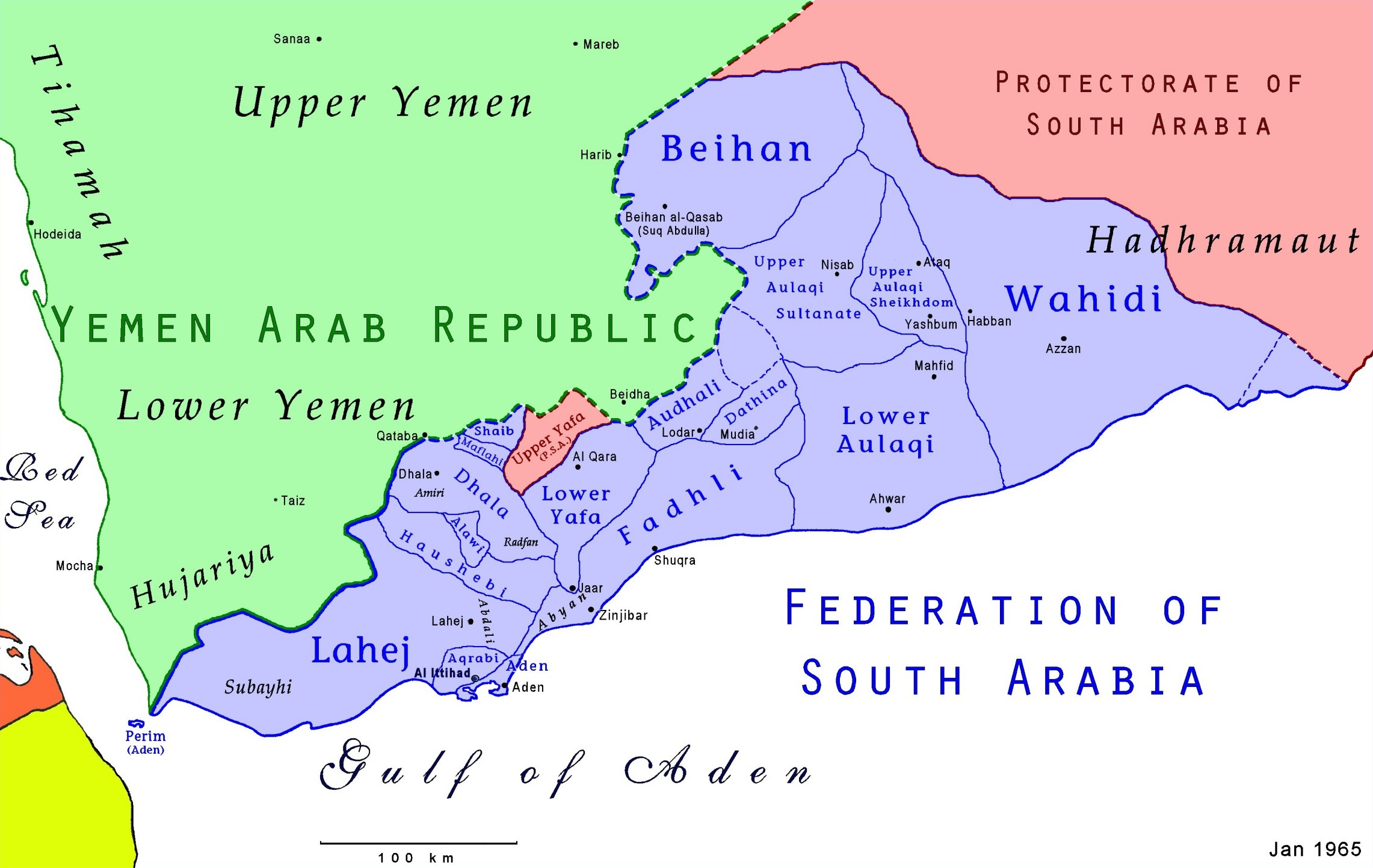
Map of the Federation and the Protectorate of South Arabia.

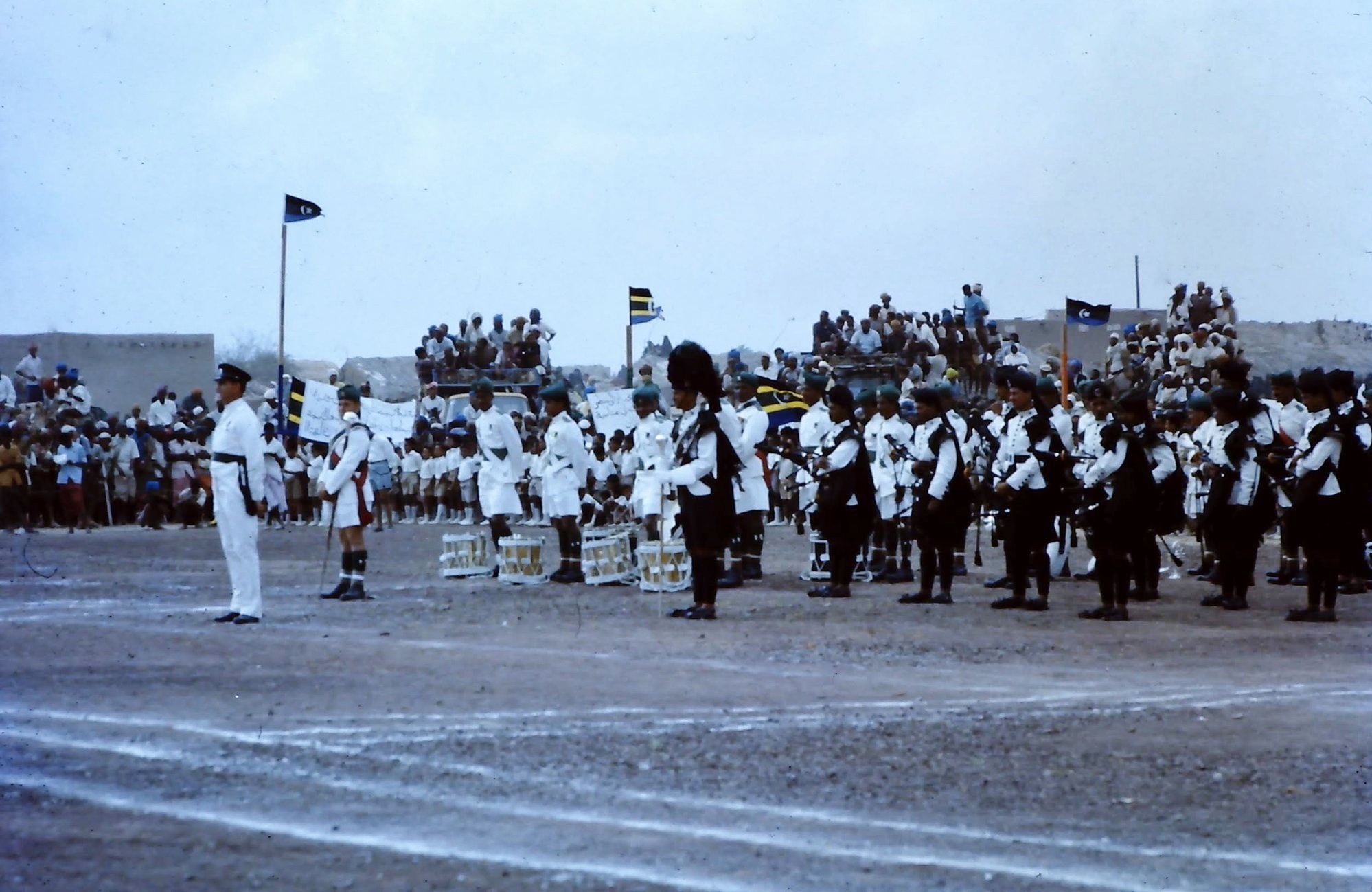
Military event held in the Fadhli Sultanate to celebrate the new Federation

The Federation of South Arabia, (Note: FSA; Arabic: اتحاد الجنوب العربي, romanised: Ittiḥād al-Janūb al-‘Arabī) known from 1959–1962 as the Federation of the Emirates of South Arabia, (Note: Arabic: اتحاد إمارات الجنوب العربي) or simply as South Arabia, (Note: Arabic: الجنوب العربي, romanised: al-Janūb al-‘Arabī) was a federal state under British protection in South Arabia. Its capital was Al-Ittihad, a suburb of Aden.

== History ==
=== Federation of the Emirates of South Arabia ===
The Federation of six states was inaugurated in the British Colony of Aden on 11 February 1959, and the Federation and Britain signed a "Treaty of Friendship and Protection," which detailed plans for British financial and military assistance. It subsequently added nine states and, on 4 April 1962, became known as the Federation of South Arabia. This was joined by the Aden Colony on 18 January 1963.

The Federation never assumed an effective political identity. It remained what it had been at the start, an aggregation of interested individuals and groups, united not so much by a positive fellow feeling as by fear of common enemies. This was reflected in the Federal constitution, which left the rulers as absolute as ever in their home districts, appointing delegates to a Federal legislature and sharing between them the Ministries and rotating Chairmanship of the executive Council.

— R. J. Gavin, Aden under British rule, 1839–1967 (1975)

=== Federation of South Arabia ===
On 23 July 1962, negotiations began in London between the British Minister of Colonies, Duncan Sandys, and the ministers of the Federation of South Arabia and the Colony of Aden. The parties raised the issue of the constitutional status of Aden and the conditions for its entry into the federation. Numerous parties and organisations in Aden protested against these negotiations, declaring that the colonial ministers did not have the right to decide the fate of the population of Aden and that only the national government of Aden, created by general elections, would be competent to decide the question of a union with the federation. To achieve all this, it was necessary to eliminate its dependence on Britain.

The Federation of South Arabia was formed on 18 January 1963, from 15 states of the Federation of Arab Emirates of the South and the Royal Colony of Aden. After the annexation of the Upper Aulaki Sultanate in June 1964, the federation included 17 states.

Representatives of the opposition, led by the Aden Trade Union Congress (ATUC), said that any union concluded against the will of the people of Aden would be dissolved at the first opportunity. On the day the London negotiations began, a protest strike was declared in Aden. The ATUC called for this strike, despite the fact that Aden had had a law prohibiting strikes since 1960, and violators were subject to imprisonment.

On 16 August 1962, negotiations ended with the signing of an agreement according to which Aden, while remaining under British sovereignty, would become part of the Federation of South Arabia. The agreement came into force on 18 January 1963, with Aden fully integrated on 1 April 1963. This agreement was explicitly an addition to the federation agreement of 11 February 1959, which remained in force. During these negotiations, agreement was also reached to introduce minor changes to the constitutional status of Aden once it became part of the federation.

With the rising violence of the Aden Emergency, the British suspended the constitution of the Federation of South Arabia and imposed direct colonial rule on 25 September 1965.

In 1966, the Federation team took part in the Commonwealth Games in Kingston, Jamaica.

On 30 November 1967, the Federation was dissolved following independence, along with the Protectorate of South Arabia, and the formation of the People's Republic of Southern Yemen.

== States ==
=== Federation of the Emirates of South Arabia ===
==== Founding states ====
- Fadhli
- Audhali
- Beihan
- Dhala
- Lower Yafa
- Upper Aulaqi Sheikhdom

==== Subsequent members ====
- Alawi
- Aqrabi
- Dathina
- Haushabi
- Lahej
- Lower Aulaqi
- Maflahi
- Shaib
- Wahidi

=== Federation of South Arabia ===
- State of Aden
- Alawi Sheikhdom
- Aqrabi Sheikhdom
- Audhali Sultanate
- Emirate of Beihan
- Dathina Sheikhdom
- Emirate of Dhala
- Fadhli Sultanate
- Haushabi Sultanate
- Sultanate of Lahej
- Lower Aulaqi Sultanate
- Sultanate of Lower Yafa
- Muflahi Sheikhdom
- Sheikhdom of Shaib
- Upper Aulaqi Sheikhdom
- Upper Aulaqi Sultanate
- Wahidi Sultanate: consisted originally of four sub-sultanates: Wahidi Balhaf, Wahidi Azzan, Wahidi Bir Ali, Wahidi Haban

== List of rulers ==
State	Last Ruler	Deposed	House	Reign	Ref(s)
Alawi	Salih ibn Sayil	28 August 1967	Al Alawi	Last reigning Sheikh (1940–1967).	
Aqrabi	Mahmud ibn Muhammad	28 August 1967	Al Aqrabi	Last reigning Sheikh (1957–1967).	
Audhali	Salih ibn al-Husayn	17 September 1967	Al Audhali	Last reigning Sultan (1928–1967).	
Lower Aulaqi	Nasir ibn Aidrus	29 November 1967	Al Awlaqi	Last reigning Sultan (1947–1967).	
Upper Aulaqi	Awad ibn Salih	29 November 1967	Al Awlaqi	Last reigning Sultan (1935–1967).	
Beihan	Saleh bin al-Husayn	28 August 1967	Al Habieli	Last reigning Emir (1935–1967).	
Dhala	Shafaul ibn Ali Shaif	17 August 1967	Al Amiri	Last reigning Emir (1954–1967).	
Fadhli	Nasir bin Abdullah	29 November 1967	Al Fadhli	Last reigning Sultan (1964–1967).	
Haushabi	Faisal bin Surur	29 November 1967	Al Haushabi	Last reigning Sultan (1955–1967).	
Lahej	Fadhl VI bin Ali	17 August 1967 (Note: Prior to his formal ascension to the throne, he had served as prince regent since 10 July 1958.)	Al Abdali	Last reigning Sultan (1958–1967).	
Wahidi Balhaf (Note: Known as Balhaf and Azzan from 1881, signifying Balhaf's merge with Wahidi Azzan. Known simply as Wahidi from 1962, when the sultanates of Wahidi Bir Ali and Wahidi Haban were made subordinate.)	Ali ibn Muhammad	17 August 1967 (Note: Prince Ali held the position of hakim (regent) from 20 February 1967 until the sultanate's abolition in August of the same year. He was never crowned sultan.)	Al Wahidi	Last governing Hakim (1967).	
Wahidi Bir Ali	Alawi ibn Salih	29 November 1967 (Note: Alawi previously reigned as sultan from 1955 until the monarchy was abolished in 1967. Before his reign ended, he was made subordinate to the Sultan of Balhaf and Azzan on 23 October 1962.)	Al Wahidi	Last reigning Sultan (1955–1967).	
Wahidi Haban	Husayn ibn Abdullah	29 November 1967 (Note: Husayn had previously reigned as sultan prior to the monarchy's abolition in 1967. Before his reign ended, he was made subordinate to the Sultan of Balhaf and Azzan on 23 October 1962.)	Al Wahidi	Last reigning Sultan (until 1967).	
Lower Yafa	Mahmud ibn Aidrus	28 August 1967 (Note: Mahmud previously reigned as sultan from 1954 until the monarchy was deposed in 1967. His reign was not initially recognised by the British government, which continued to recognise his still-living father and predecessor as sultan until 1958.)	Al Afifi (Note: A clan of the Yafa tribe. The Yafai are divided into ten sheikhdoms that were spread across the former sultanates of Lower Yafa and Upper Yafa.)	Last reigning Sultan (1954–1967).	

=== Chief Ministers ===
- Hassan Ali Bayumi (18 January 1963 – 24 June 1963)
- Zayn Abdu Baharun (9 July 1963 – 23 January 1965)
- Abdul-Qawi Hassan Makkawi (7 March 1965 – 25 September 1965)
- Ali Musa al-Babakr (25 September 1965 – 30 August 1966)
- Salih al-Awadli (30 August 1966 – 30 November 1967)

=== High Commissioners ===
- Sir Charles Johnston (18 January 1963 – 17 July 1963)
- Sir Kennedy Trevaskis (17 July 1963 – 21 December 1964)
- Sir Richard Turnbull (21 December 1964 – 22 May 1967)
- Sir Humphrey Trevelyan (22 May 1967 – 30 November 1967)

== Postage stamps ==
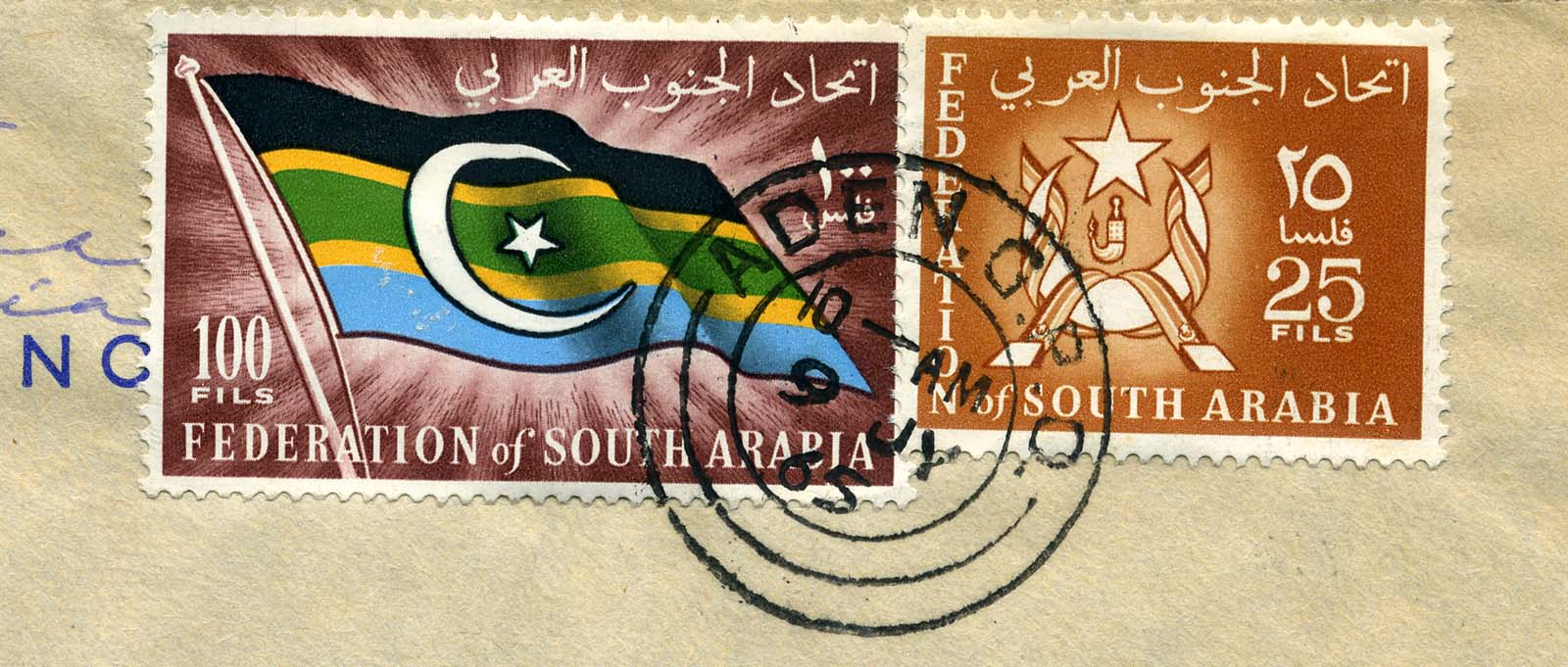
Two values of the 1965 definitives used at Aden

The Federation issued its own postage stamps from 1963 to 1966, replacing postage stamps of Aden. Most of its issues were part of the omnibus issues common to all the Commonwealth territories, but it did issue its own definitive stamps on 1 April 1965. The set of 14 included 10 values, from 5 to 75 fils, each depicting the arms of the Federation in a single colour, while the top four values (100 fils, 250 fils, 500 fils, and 1 dinar), featured the flag of the Federation.

The stamps referred to above are those listed in the Scott Standard Postage Stamp Catalog. A number of other stamps were also issued and are listed in Stanley Gibbons and other widely used stamp catalogs. It is possible, or even likely, that some of the stamps of South Arabia were not issued primarily for postal use.

== See also ==
- United Nations Security Council Resolution 188
