= Al-Ahrar Organization =

Social democratic political party in Yemen

Al-Ahrar Organization تنظيم الاحرار
- Leader: Abduh Bishr
- Founded: 2011
- Split from: General People's Congress
- Ideology: Social democracy Anti-austerity; Anti-authoritarianism; Anti-Americanism
- Political position: Center-left
- Colours: Red
- House of Representatives: 12 / 301 (2011)

The Al-Ahrar Organization (Arabic: تنظيم الاحرار, Tanẓīm al-Aḥrār), literally meaning Organization of the Free, is a center-left political party in Yemen. It was founded as a parliamentary block in early 2011 in reaction to the repression and deadly violence against the protesters of the Yemeni Revolution by the government. Initially, it consisted of 12 parliamentarians under the leadership of the politician Abduh Bishr, who had decided to leave the governing General People's Congress in protest. Its Facebook page was set up on 1 May 2011. In 2015, the party denounced the Saudi Arabian–led intervention in Yemen, calling it an act of aggression. During some time between 2015 and 2019, party leader Bishr was member of the Supreme Revolutionary Committee and Minister of Industry and Trade of the Houthi government

== Positions ==
In an interview in December 2012, party leader Bishr stated that he believes that the real revolution is yet to come and that he will be the first to join it in the streets. In the same interview, he also criticized what he called an "American occupation" of the country, as well as the inaction from the parliament in the political crisis. Furthermore, he criticized corruption in the government and the refusal of the government to pay compensations to the ones killed or wounded during the revolution. In August 2018, the party called for peaceful demonstrations against the continuation of the unjust war and the deterioration of living conditions, evident in phenomenons like rising prices for food and fuel or the failure to pay salaries.

== Relations with the Houthis after 2019 ==
On 24 June 2019, party leader Abduh Bishr voiced strong accusations against the Houthis. He claimed that the Houthis had raided his house in Al Hudaydah and his flat in Sanaa in the months before, sent threats against his life, closed 17 offices of the party, jailed relatives and party members, froze the party's finances, hindered party members from performing political activities or holding assemblies and were surveilling his movements. For example, he claimed that his nephew was kidnapped on 8 June 2019 by an armed convoy while Bishr himself was away. In his statement, Bishr called on parliamentarians in the House of Representatives to take action against the unlawful acts.

In November 2019, Bishr ridiculed the Houthi "anti-corruption campaign" by presenting a list of examples where the group's leadership itself was involved in corrupt behavior and claiming that Mahdi al-Mashat promoted and protected corrupt individuals. About a year later, he announced his resignation from the House of Representatives due to the violations of the chairman of the Supreme Political Council Mahdi al-Mashat. This happened following a split in the Sanaa parliament caused by the increasing authoritarianism of the Houthis.

In March 2022, accusations against party leader Abduh Bishr surfaced, claiming he tortured a man in Hajjah Governorate together with some companions and held him for 20 days. The accusations were published two days after Bishr had announced a protest campaign against the Houthis to "bring them to fall from within", starting with a sit-in on Tahrir square in Sanaa, where he accused the Houthis of banditry and corruption and demanded action against the deterioration of living standards in the country.

== See also ==
- List of political parties in Yemen
