= Organisation of Yemeni Revolutionary Resistors =

1970–1979 rebel group in North Yemen

Organisation of Yemeni Revolutionary Resistors منظمة المقاومين الثوريين اليمنيين
- Secretary-General: Nasser Al-Saeed
- Founded: January 25, 1971
- Dissolved: 5 March 1979
- Succeeded by: Yemeni Socialist Party
- Ideology: Marxism–Leninism
- National affiliation: National Democratic Front

The Organization of Yemeni Revolutionary Resistors (Arabic: منظمة المقاومين الثوريين اليمنيين) was a rebel group in North Yemen. It was founded in 1970, with background in the republican forces that helped to defend San'a during the royalist siege 1967–1968 (see North Yemen Civil War). The movement was engaged in guerrilla warfare 1970–1973.

On February 2, 1976, the organisation, together with the Revolutionary Democratic Party of Yemen, the Labour Party, the Popular Vanguard and the People's Democratic Union, founded the National Democratic Front in San'a.

On March 5, 1979 the party merged with the other founding parties of the NDF, forming the Yemeni Popular Unity Party. Four days later, the Popular Unity Party merged into the Yemeni Socialist Party (but retaining the name 'Popular Unity Party' for activities in North Yemen). The NDF did however continue to exist as a separate structure, with other groups joining and leaving it.
