= National Democratic Front (Yemen) =

1970s–80s opposition alliance in North Yemen

- Leaders: Yahya Shami; Sultan Ahmad Umar
- Dates active: 1976–1982
- Groups: Revolutionary Democratic Party of Yemen; Organisation of Yemeni Revolutionary Resistors; Popular Vanguard; Labour Party; Popular Democratic Union
- Ideology: North Yemeni nationalism; Leftism; Marxism–Leninism; Nasserism; Neo-Ba'athism; Ibrahim al-Hamdi loyalism; Gaddafism; Revolutionary socialism; Anti-imperialism; Secularism
- Political position: Far-left
- Wars: NDF Rebellion

The National Democratic Front (Arabic: الجبهة الوطنية الديمقراطية), also known as the Jabha, was a leftist opposition militant group in Yemen Arab Republic. It founded as an umbrella of various opposition movements in North Yemen on February 2, 1976, in Sana'a. The five founding organisations of NDF were the Revolutionary Democratic Party of Yemen, Organisation of Yemeni Revolutionary Resistors, the Labour Party, the Popular Vanguard and the Popular Democratic Union.

On March 5, 1979, the five founding parties of the NDF merged to form the Yemeni Popular Unity Party. Four days later, the Popular Unity Party merged into the Yemeni Socialist Party (but retaining the name 'Popular Unity Party' for activities in North Yemen). The NDF did however continue to exist as a separate structure. It was joined by Qassam Salam's Ba'ath Party, and the Democratic Septembrist Organization. In 1978 the Ba'ath Party left the front and in 1979 the June 13 Front of Popular Forces joined it.

== As the National Democratic Front Party ==
National Democratic Front Party الجبهة الوطنية الديمقراطية
- General Secretary: Nashwan Nusayr an-Nusayri
- Founded: 1976
- Ideology: Arab nationalism Democratic socialism
- Political position: Centre-left
- Colours: Light blue
- House of Representatives: 0 / 301

The remnants of the party became known as the National Democratic Front Party (Arabic: حزب الجبهة الوطنية الديمقراطية, Ḥizb al-Jabhat al-Wataniyah ad-Dīmuqrātiyah), which still operates and which participated among others in the 2003 Yemeni parliamentary election, where it failed to win a seat and got 0.12% of the vote.

During the Yemeni Revolution, it issued a statement demanding elections to be held as planned on April 27, stressing its importance for political pluralism and the peaceful transfer of power. In September 2014, it signed a statement expressing support for the Houthi takeover in Yemen, which also underlines that this takeover would represent the people of Yemen and not only the Houthis.

While two other center-left parties that initially supported the Houthis, Al-Ahrar Organization and the Yemeni Labour Party, later got into conflict with them, the National Democratic Front Party continued to support the Houthis over the years. On 19 April 2019, the new general secretary Nashwan Nusayr an-Nusayri called on the parties, forces and political organizations that oppose the "aggression", to continue their efforts and strengthen the unity of the "home front". Particularly, he criticized the "occupation" of the eastern governorates and Soqotra by "aggressor countries". On the other hand, he also stated support for a national dialogue to reach an "honorable and just" peace.

== See also ==
- List of political parties in Yemen
