= Revolutionary Democratic Party of Yemen =

1968–1979 political party in North Yemen

Revolutionary Democratic Party of Yemen الحزب الديمقراطي الثوري اليمن
- Secretary-General: Sultan Omar
- Founded: June 1968
- Dissolved: 5 March 1979
- Succeeded by: Yemeni Socialist Party
- Military wing: People's Revolutionary Army
- Ideology: Marxism–Leninism
- National affiliation: National Democratic Front

Revolutionary Democratic Party of Yemen (Arabic: الحزب الديمقراطي الثوري اليمن) was a political party in North Yemen, founded by a conference of the members of the Arab Nationalist Movement in North Yemen in June 1968. The conference resolved to break its organizational ties with the central structures of the ANM and form the Revolutionary Democratic Party as an independent Marxist-Leninist party. Sultan Omar was the general secretary of the new party. The objectives of the party included resistance against the feudalists and the comprador bourgeoisie, recover lands claimed by Saudi Arabia and reunification with South Yemen. The party supported the struggle of the National Liberation Front in South Yemen against the rule of Qahtan ash-Sha'bi.

The party supported the idea of taking up armed struggle, but initially the party leadership considered the conditions for guerrilla struggle in North Yemen premature. Generally the party had its main base in urban areas, and could not muster rural tribal forces against the government. The party had some links with junior army officers, but could not build up a strong military structure. On August 23–24, 1968 clashes erupted between government troops attacked militants of the party, resulting in a temporary setback for the party. In early 1970 the party founded the People's Revolutionary Army as its military wing. Alongside the Organisation of Revolutionary Resistors of Yemen, it began guerrilla warfare against government and tribal forces.

On March 23, 1973, the party signed a joint appeal of political forces in North Yemen against the ceding of Yemeni territories to Saudi Arabia.

The party was led by a Politburo and a Central Committee. At its founding conference, an 11-member Central Committee was elected.

On February 2, 1976, the party, together with the Organisation of Revolutionary Resistors of Yemen, the Labour Party, the Popular Vanguard and the Popular Democratic Union, founded the National Democratic Front in San'a.

On March 5, 1979 the party merged with the other founding parties of the NDF, forming the Yemeni Popular Unity Party. Four days later, the Popular Unity Party merged into the Yemeni Socialist Party (but retaining the name 'Popular Unity Party' for activities in North Yemen). The NDF did however continue to exist as a separate structure, with other groups joining and leaving it.

A party with the same name, led by Mabkhut Az-Zanibi, was later refounded, and active during the early 1990s. It might have been disbanded.

== See also ==
- List of political parties in Yemen
