= Wahidi =

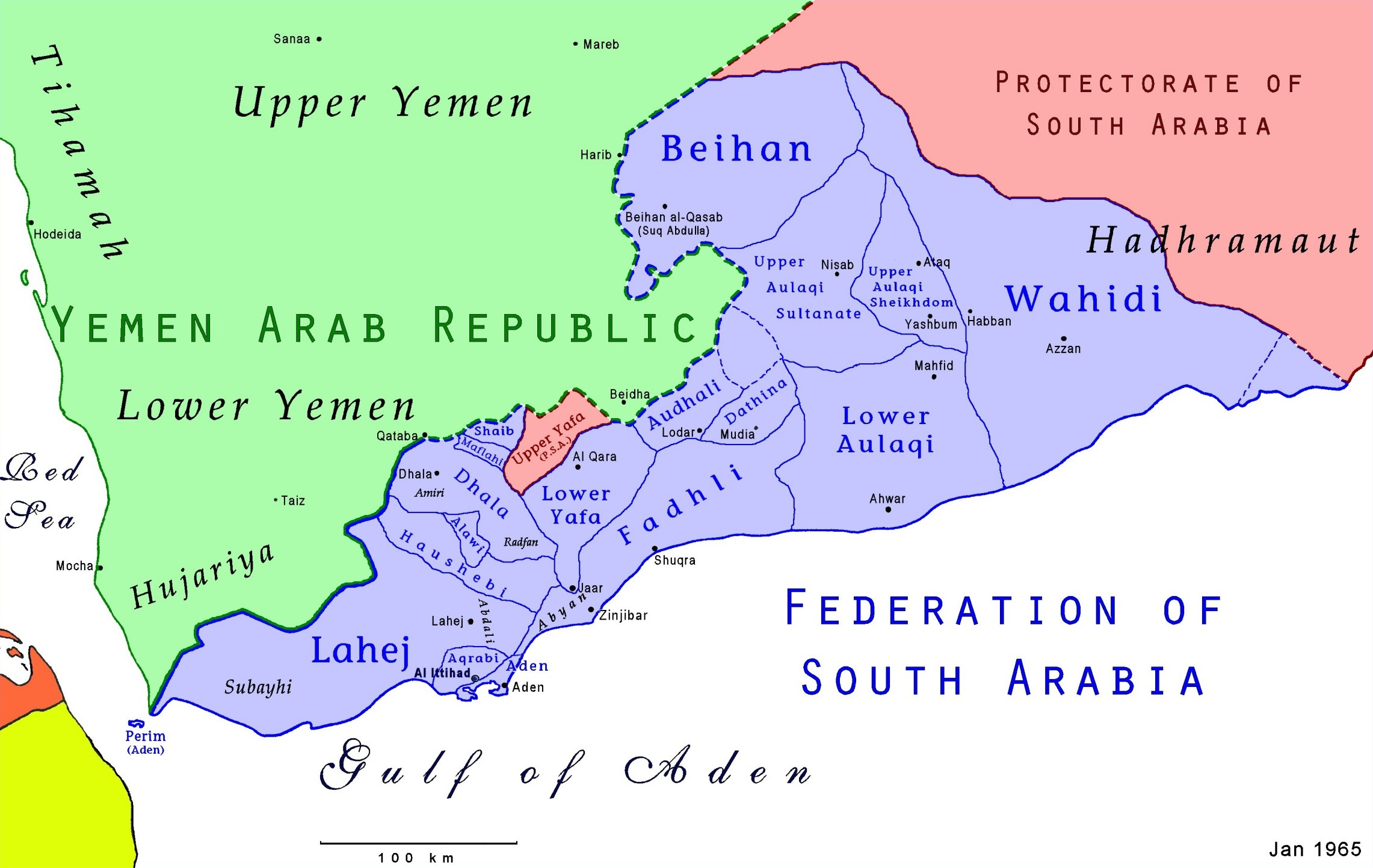
Wahidi on a map of the Federation of South Arabia

Wahidi (Arabic: واحدي Wāḥidī) was a sultanate in South Arabia, now part of Yemen. It lay along the Gulf of Aden and bordered Bayḥān to the north, the Upper and Lower ʿAwlaqī sultanates to the west and the Quʿayṭī sultanate in the east. Its main cities were Mayfaʿa, the administrative centre; ʿAzzān, the seat of the ruling dynasty; Ḥabbān, the commercial centre; Qanā; Biʾr ʿAlī; and al-Ḥawṭa.

Wahidi was supposedly founded by a certain ʿAbd al-Wāḥid. He is usually dated to the early 19th century, but Bal-Faqīh al-Shiḥrī puts him about two centuries earlier. His tomb was said to lie in the mosque of Ḥabbān. The sultanate split in the 1880s, with the Wahidi rulers of Biʾr ʿAlī and Balḥāf becoming independent of the ruler of ʿAzzān and Ḥabbān. By 1888–1890, when the British signed treaties of protection with the rulers of the area, incorporating it into the Aden Protectorate, there were four states, their rulers known to the British by different titles: the ruler of Biʾr ʿAlī was a sultan, that of Balḥāf a tribal chief and those of Ḥawra and ʿIrqa shaykhs.

== See also ==
- Wahidi Azzan
- Wahidi Haban
