= List of sovereign states in the 1880s =

This is a list of sovereign states in the 1880s, giving an overview of states around the world during the period between 1 January 1880 and 31 December 1889. It contains entries, arranged alphabetically, with information on the status and recognition of their sovereignty. It includes widely recognized sovereign states, entities which were de facto sovereign but which were not widely recognized by other states, and 1 state which was initially unrecognized but then gained full recognition later in the decade.

== Sovereign states ==
Name and capital city	Information on status and recognition of sovereignty
=== A ===
Abemama – Kingdom of Abemama; Capital: Abemama	Widely recognized independent state.
Aboh – Kingdom of Aboh; Capital: Aboh	Widely recognized independent state.
Abuja – Abuja Emirate; Capital: Abuja	Widely recognized independent state.
Agadez – Tenere Sultanate of Aïr; Capital: Agadez	Widely recognized independent state.
Alawi Sheikhdom – Alawi Sheikhdom; Capital: Al Qasha	Widely recognized independent state.
Andorra – Principality of Andorra; Capital: Andorra la Vella	Widely recognized independent state. The President of France and Bishop of Urgell were ex officio Co-Princes of Andorra. The defense of Andorra was the responsibility of France and Spain.
Angoche – Angoche Sultanate; Capital: Angoche
Ankole – Kingdom of Ankole; Capital: Mbarara	Widely recognized independent state.
Annam – Empire of Annam (to 25 August 1883); Capital: Phú Xuân	Widely recognized independent state to 1883. Internal imperial system within Chinese tributary to 1883.
Aqrabi – Aqrabi Sheikhdom; Capital: Bir Ahmad	Widely recognized independent state.
Argentina – Argentine Republic; Capital: Buenos Aires
Aro – Aro Confederacy; Capital: Arochukwu	Widely recognized independent state.
Ashanti – Asante Union; Capital: Kumasi	Widely recognized independent state.
Aussa – Sultanate of Aussa; Capital: Aussa	Widely recognized independent state.
Austria-Hungary – Austro-Hungarian Empire; Capital: Vienna (Cisleithania), Budapest (Transleithania)	Widely recognized independent state. Austria-Hungary is a constitutional dual monarchy formed by the Empire of Austria (Cisleithania) and the Kingdom of Hungary (Transleithania). The following are Crown Lands of Austria-Hungary: Bohemia (Crown land of Cisleithania); Bukovina (Crown land of Cisleithania); Carinthia (Crown land of Cisleithania); Carniola (Crown land of Cisleithania); Croatia-Slavonia (Crown land of Transleithania); Dalmatia (Crown land of Cisleithania); Fiume (Crown land of Transleithania); Galicia and Lodomeria (Crown land of Cisleithania); Gorizia and Gradisca (Crown land of Cisleithania); Hungary (Crown land of Transleithania); Istria (Crown land of Cisleithania); Kraków (Crown land of Cisleithania); Lower Austria (Crown land of Cisleithania); Moravia (Crown land of Cisleithania); Salzburg (Crown land of Cisleithania); Silesia (Crown land of Cisleithania); Styria (Crown land of Cisleithania); Trieste (Crown land of Cisleithania); Tyrol (Crown land of Cisleithania); Upper Austria (Crown land of Cisleithania); Vorarlberg (Crown land of Cisleithania)
=== B ===
Baguirmi – Kingdom of Baguirmi; Capital: Massenya	Tributary state of the Bornu Empire.
Bali – Kingdom of Bali; Capital: Klungkung	Widely recognized independent state. Bali was a series of kingdoms that ruled the island of Bali.
Baol – Kingdom of Baol; Capital: Diourbel	Widely recognized independent state.
Barotseland – Kingdom of Barotseland; Capital: Mongu	Widely recognized independent state.
Belgium – Kingdom of Belgium; Capital: Brussels	Widely recognized independent state. Belgium has sovereignty over 1 corporatocracy and 1 condominium: Congo (Corporatocracy, 1 July 1885); Moresnet (Condominium sui iuris of Belgium and Prussia)
Benin – Kingdom of Benin; Capital: Edo	Widely recognized independent state.
Bhutan – Kingdom of Bhutan; Capital: Punakha	Widely recognized independent state.
Biu – Biu Kingdom; Capital: Biu	Widely recognized independent state.
Bohemia – Kingdom of Bohemia; Capital: Prague	Widely recognized independent state.
Bolivia – Republic of Bolivia; Capital: Sucre (official), La Paz (administrative)	Widely recognized independent state.
Bora Bora – Kingdom of Bora Bora; Capital: Nunue, Vaitape	Widely recognized independent state.
Bornu – Bornu Empire; Capital: Ngazargamu	Widely recognized independent state.
Brakna – Brakna Emirate; Capital: Aleg	Widely recognized independent state.
→ → Brazil; Capital: Rio de Janeiro: Empire of Brazil (to 15 November 1889); Republic of the United States of Brazil (from 15 November 1889)	Brazil was a federation of 20 states and one federal district. (Note: 20 States: Alagoas, Amazonas, Bahia, Ceará, Espírito Santo, Goiás, Maranhão, Mato Grosso, Minas Gerais, Pará, Paraíba, Paraná, Pernambuco, Piauí, Rio Grande do Norte, Rio Grande do Sul, Rio de Janeiro, Santa Catarina, São Paulo, Sergipe. 1 Federal District: Federal District.)
Brunei – Sultanate of Brunei (to 1888); Capital: Kampong Ayer	Widely recognized independent state to 1888. Annexed by the United Kingdom on 1888.
Buganda – Kingdom of Buganda; Capital: Mengo	Widely recognized independent state.
Bulgaria – Principality of Bulgaria; Capital: Sofia	De facto independent, and de jure vassal state under the suzerainty of the Ottoman Empire.
Bunyoro – Bunyoro-Kitara Kingdom; Capital: Hoima	Widely recognized independent state.
Burma – Kingdom of Burma (to 1885); Capital: Mandalay	Widely recognized independent state to 1885. Annexed by the United Kingdom in 1885.
Burundi – Kingdom of Burundi; Capital: Gitega	Widely recognized independent state.
Busoga – Kingdom of Busoga; Capital: Bugembe	Widely recognized independent state.
=== C ===
Chile – Republic of Chile; Capital: Santiago	Widely recognized independent state.
→ China – Great Qing Empire; Capital: Beijing	Widely recognized independent state. China had sovereignty over one territory: Lanfang Republic (Vassal state); Tibet (Protectorate) including one de jure protectorate: Sikkim (Protectorate)
Chokwe – Chokwe Kingdom (from 1887); Capital: Not specified	Widely recognized independent state from 1887.
Colombia; Capital: Bogotá: United States of Colombia (to 1886); Republic of Colombia (from 1886)	Widely recognized independent state.
Congo – Congo Free State (from July 1, 1885); Capital: Boma: International Association of the Congo (to 1 July 1885); Congo Free State (from 1 July 1885)	Sovereignty recognized on 8 November 1884. Widely recognized independent state from 1 July 1885.
Costa Rica – Republic of Costa Rica; Capital: San Jose	Widely recognized independent state.
=== D ===
Dagbon – Kingdom of Dagbon (to 1888); Capital: Yendi	Widely recognized independent state to 1888.
Dahomey – Kingdom of Dahomey; Capital: Abomey	Widely recognized independent state.
Dai Nam – Dai Nam Realm (to 25 August 1883); Capital: Phú Xuân	Widely recognized independent state to 25 August 1883 and Tributary state of China. Annexed by France on 25 August 1883 as a protectorate.
Damagaram – Sultanate of Damagaram; Capital: Zinder	Widely recognized independent state.
Denmark – Kingdom of Denmark; Capital: Copenhagen	Widely recognized independent state. Denmark had sovereignty over the following overseas territories: (Denmark) Danish West Indies (Colony); (Denmark) Greenland (Territory); Iceland (Dependency)
Dhala – Emirate of Dhala (until January 1881); Capital: Dhale	Widely recognized independent state until January 1881. Joins the Aden Protectorate.
Dominican Republic – Second Republic; Capital: Santo Domingo	Widely recognized independent state.
Dosso – Dosso Kingdom; Capital: Dosso	Widely recognized independent state.
=== E ===
Ecuador – Republic of Ecuador; Capital: Quito	Widely recognized independent state.
El Salvador – Republic of El Salvador; Capital: San Salvador	Widely recognized independent state.
Ethiopia – Ethiopian Empire; Capital: Addis Ababa	Widely recognized independent state.
=== F ===
Fadhli – Fadhli Sultanate (to 1888); Capital: Shuqrah	Widely recognized independent state to 1888.
France – French Republic; Capital: Paris	Widely recognized independent state. France had sovereignty over the following overseas territories: Annam (Protectorate from 1883 to 1887); Cambodia (Protectorate to 1887); Comoros (Protectorate from April 21, 1886); Dai Nam (Protectorate from 25 August, 1883); French Algeria (de jure Department of Metropolitan France, de facto Colony); (France) French Cochinchina (Colony to 1887); French Congo (Colony from 1882); French Gabon (Protectorate); French Guiana (Colony); French India (Colony); French Indochina (Colony from 1887); French Ivory Coast (Protectorate); French Oceania - French Establishments in Oceania (Colony); French Somaliland (Colony from 1883); Guadeloupe (Colony); Malagasy Protectorate (Protectorate from 1882); Martinique (Colony); Mayotte (Colony); New Caledonia (Colony); Obock (Colony); Réunion (Colony); Saint Pierre and Miquelon (Colony); Shanghai (Concession); Tientsin (Concession); Tonkin (Protectorate from 1883 to 1887); Tunisia (Protectorate from 1881); Upper River (Colony from 1880)
Futa Jallon – Imamate of Futa Jallon; Capital: Timbo	Widely recognized independent state.
=== G ===
Garo – Kingdom of Garo (to 1883); Capital: Not specified	Widely recognized independent state to 1883. Annexed by Jimma in 1883.
Gaza – Gaza Empire; Capital: Manjacaze	Widely recognized independent state.
Geledi – Sultanate of the Geledi; Capital: Afgooye	Widely recognized independent state.
Gera – Kingdom of Gera (to 1887); Capital: Chala	Widely recognized independent state to 1887. Annexed by the Ethiopian Empire in 1887.
Germany – German Empire; Capital: Berlin	Widely recognized independent state. Germany had sovereignty over the following overseas territories: Colinsland (Colony from 1884 to 1885); German Congo (Colony from 1884 to 1885); German East Africa (Colony from 27 February 1885); German New Guinea (Colony from 3 November 1884); German South West Africa (Colony from 7 August 1884); German West Africa (Colony from 1884); Kamerun (Colony from 17 August 1884); Togoland (Protectorate from 5 July 1884); Wituland (Protectorate from 1885)
Gomma – Kingdom of Gomma (to 1886); Capital: Agaro	Widely recognized independent state to 1886. Annexed by the Ethiopian Empire in 1886.
Gowa – Sultanate of Gowa; Capital: Jongaya	Widely recognized independent state.
Greece – Kingdom of Greece; Capital: Athens	Widely recognized independent state.
Guatemala – Republic of Guatemala; Capital: Guatemala City	Widely recognized independent state.
Gumma – Kingdom of Gumma (to 1885); Capital: Not specified	Widely recognized independent state to 1885. Annexed by the Ethiopian Empire in 1885.
Gyaaman – State of Gyaaman; Capital: Sampa, Drobo	Widely recognized independent state.
=== H ===
Ha'il – Emirate of Jabal Shammar; Capital: Ha'il	Widely recognized independent state.
Haiti – Republic of Haiti; Capital: Port-au-Prince	Widely recognized independent state.
→ Harar – Emirate of Harar (to 1887); Capital: Ge	Subject of the Khedivate of Egypt to 1884. Widely recognized independent state from 1884 to 1887. Disestablished 1887.
Hawaii – Kingdom of Hawaii; Capital: Honolulu	Widely recognized independent state.
Hobyo – Sultanate of Hobyo (to 1888); Capital: Hobyo	Widely recognized independent state to 1888. Annexed by Italy in 1888.
Honduras – Republic of Honduras; Capital: Tegucigalpa	Widely recognized independent state.
Huahine – Kingdom of Huahine; Capital: Huahine	Widely recognized independent state.
Hunza – State of Hunza; Capital: Baltit	Widely recognized independent state.
=== I ===
Igala – Igala Kingdom; Capital: Idah	Widely recognized independent state.
Igara – Kingdom of Igara Capital: Not specified	Widely recognized independent state.
Ilé-Ifẹ̀ – Ilé-Ifẹ̀ Kingdom; Capital: Ilé-Ifẹ̀	Widely recognized independent state.
Isaaq – Isaaq Sultanate (to 1884); Capital: Hargeisa	Widely recognized independent state to 1884. Annexed by the United Kingdom in 1884
Italy – Kingdom of Italy; Capital: Rome	Widely recognized independent state. Italy had sovereignty over the following overseas territories: Italian Eritrea (Colony from 1882); Italian Somaliland (Colony from 1889)
=== J ===
Japan – Empire of Japan; Capital: Tokyo City	Widely recognized independent state. Japan had sovereignty over the following overseas territories: Hokkaido (Colony); Kuril Islands (Colony); Ryukyu Islands (Colony)
Jimma – Kingdom of Jimma (to 1884); Capital: Jiren	Widely recognized independent state to 1884. Annexed by the Ethiopian Empire in 1884
Johor – Sultanate of Johor (from December 11, 1885); Capital: Singapore	Widely recognized independent state from December 11, 1885. Recognised the United Kingdom on December 11, 1885.
Jolof – Jolof Kingdom (to 1889); Capital: Ouarkhokh	Widely recognized independent state to 1889. Annexed by France in 1889.
=== K ===
Kaarta – Kingdom of Kaarta; Capital: Diangounté, Nioros	Widely recognized independent state.
Kaffa – Kingdom of Kaffa; Capital: Bonga, Anderaccha	Widely recognized independent state.
Kajara – Kajara Kingdom; Capital: Not specified	Widely recognized independent state.
Kakongo – Kingdom of Kakongo (to 1885); Capital: Kinguele	Widely recognized independent state to 1885. Incorporated into Portuguese Angola in 1885.
Kasanje – Jaga Kingdom; Capital: Not specified	Widely recognized independent state.
Kathiri – Hadhrami Kathiri Dynasty in Seiyun (until January 1889); Capital: Seiyun	Widely recognized independent state until January 1889. Joins the Aden Protectorate.
Kebbi – Kebbi Emirate; Capital: Argungu	Widely recognized independent state.
Kénédougou – Kénédougou Kingdom; Capital: Sikasso	Widely recognized independent state.
Khasso – Kingdom of Khasso (to 1880); Capital: Médine	Widely recognized independent state to 1880. Incorporated into French Sudan in 1880.
Kong – Kong Empire; Capital: Kong	Widely recognized independent state.
→ → → → → → Korea – Kingdom of Great Joseon; Capital: Seoul	Widely recognized independent state.
Koya Temne – Kingdom of Koya; Capital: Grand Cape Mount	Widely recognized independent state.
Kuba – Kingdom of Kuba (to 1884); Capital: Not specified	Widely recognized independent state to 1884. Incorporated into the International Association of the Congo in 1884.
=== L ===
Lafia Beri-Beri – Lafia Beri-Beri Kingdom; Capital: Lafia	Widely recognized independent state.
Liberia – Republic of Liberia; Capital: Monrovia	Widely recognized independent state.
Liechtenstein – Principality of Liechtenstein; Capital: Vaduz	Widely recognized independent state.
Limmu-Ennarea – Kingdom of Limmu-Ennarea; Capital: Saqqa	Widely recognized independent state.
Loango – Kingdom of Loango (to 1883); Capital: Buali	Widely recognized independent state to 1883. Incorporated into French Congo in 1883.
Lower Aulaqi – Lower Aulaqi Sultanate (until January 1889); Capital: Ahwar	Widely recognized independent state until January 1889. Joined the Aden Protectorate.
Luba – Luba Empire (to 1889); Capital: Mwibele	Widely recognized independent state to 1889. Incorporated into the Congo Free State in 1889.
Lunda – Luba Empire (to 1887); Capital: Not specified	Widely recognized independent state to 1887. Incorporated into the Chokwe Kingdom in 1887.
Luxembourg – Grand Duchy of Luxembourg; Capital: Luxembourg City	Widely recognized independent state.
=== M ===
Maguindanao – Sultanate of Maguindanao; Capital: Kuta Watu	Widely recognized independent state.
Mahra – Sultanate of Mahra (until January 1887); Capital: Qishn	Widely recognized independent state until January 1887. Joined the Aden Protectorate.
Majeerteen Sultanate – Majeerteen Kingdom (to 7 April 1889); Capital: Alula	Widely recognized independent state to 7 April 1889. Annexed by Italy on 7 April 1889.
Mangareva – Kingdom of Mangareva (to 21 February 1881); Capital: Mangareva	Widely recognized independent state to 21 February 1881.
Manipur – Kingdom of Manipur; Capital: Imphal	Widely recognized independent state.
Maravi – Kingdom of Maravi; Capital: Manthimba	Widely recognized independent state.
Matabeleland – Matabele Kingdom; Capital: Bulawayo	Widely recognized independent state.
Mbunda – Mbunda Kingdom Capital: Not specified	Widely recognized independent state.
Merina – Kingdom of Imerina; Capital: Antananarivo	Widely recognized independent state.
Mexico – United Mexican States; Capital: Mexico City	Widely recognized independent state.
Monaco – Principality of Monaco; Capital: Monaco	Widely recognized independent state.
Montenegro – Principality of Montenegro; Capital: Cetinje	Widely recognized independent state.
Morocco – Sultanate of Morocco; Capital: Fes	Widely recognized independent state.
Mossi Kingdoms – Mossi Empire; Capital: Multiple capitals	Widely recognized independent state. The following are a number of different kingdoms that make up the Mossi Empire: Gurunsi; Gwiriko; Liptako; Nungu; Wogodogo; Yatenga
Mthwakazi – Kingdom of Mthwakazi; Capital: Bulawayo	Widely recognized independent state.
Muscat and Oman – Sultanate of Muscat and Oman; Capital: Muscat	Widely recognized independent state.
Mutayr – Emirate of Mutayr Capital: Not specified	Widely recognized independent state.
=== N ===
Najran – Principality of Najran; Capital: Najran	Widely recognized independent state.
Negeri Sembilan; Capital: Seremban	Widely recognized independent state.
Nejd – Emirate of Nejd; Capital: Riyadh	Widely recognized independent state.
Nepal – Kingdom of Nepal; Capital: Kathmandu	Widely recognized independent state.
Netherlands – Kingdom of The Netherlands; Capital: Amsterdam	Widely recognized independent state.
→ Nicaragua – Republic of Nicaragua; Capital: Managua	Widely recognized independent state.
Niue – Kingdom of Niue-Fekai; Capital: Not specified	Widely recognized independent state.
Nri – Kingdom of Nri; Capital: Igbo-Ukwu	Widely recognized independent state.
Nshenyi – Nshenyi Kingdom; Capital: Not specified	Widely recognized independent state.
=== O ===
Obwera – Obwera Kingdom; Capital: Not specified	Widely recognized independent state.
Onitsha – Onitsha Kingdom; Capital: Onitsha	Widely recognized independent state.
Orange Free State; Capital: Bloemfontein	Widely recognized independent state.
Oron – Oron Nation; Capital: Oron	Widely recognized independent state.
Ottoman Empire – Sublime Ottoman State; Capital: Constantinople	Widely recognized independent state. The following are autonomous territories of the Ottoman Empire: Egypt (De jure Autonomous vassal under de facto British occupation); Kuwait (Vassal state); Mecca (Non-sovereign state); Qatar (De facto autonomous Kazak); Samos (Autonomous state); Tunis (Vassal state; De facto Independent state to 1881)
Oyo – Oyo Empire; Capital: Oyo-Ile	Widely recognized independent state.
=== P ===
Pahang – Sultanate of Pahang (to 8 September 1881); Capital: Pekan	Widely recognized independent state to 8 September 1881.
Paraguay – Republic of Paraguay; Capital: Asunción	Widely recognized independent state.
Pattani – Sultanate of Patani; Capital: Patani	Widely recognized independent state.
Persia – Sublime State of Persia; Capital: Tehran	Widely recognized independent state.
→ Peru; Capital: Lima: Chilean occupation of Peru (to 29 October 1883); Peruvian Republic (to 27 August 1884); National Reconstruction (from 27 August 1884)	Widely recognized independent state.
Portugal – Kingdom of Portugal; Capital: Lisbon	Widely recognized independent state. The following are colonies, vassal state and possession of Portugal: Portuguese Cape Verde (Colony); Portuguese East Africa (Colony); Portuguese Guinea (Colony); Portuguese India (Colony); Portuguese Macau (Colony); Portuguese São Tomé and Príncipe (Colony); Portuguese Timor (Colony); Portuguese West Africa (Colony); Fort of São João Baptista de Ajudá (Possession)
Potiskum – Potiskum Emirate; Capital: Potiskum	Widely recognized independent state.
=== Q ===
Qu'aiti – Qu'aiti Sultanate of Shihr and Mukalla (to May 1888); Capital: Al-Shihr	Widely recognized independent state until May 1888. Incorporated into the British Aden Protectorate.
=== R ===
→ Raiatea – Kingdom of Raiatea (to 19 March 1888); Capital: Uturoa	Widely recognized independent state to 19 March 1888. Annexed by France on 19 March 1888.
Rapa Nui – Kingdom of Rapa Nui (to 9 September 1888); Capital: Anakena	Widely recognized independent state to 9 September 1888. Annexed by Chile on 9 September 1888.
→ Rarotonga – Kingdom of Rarotonga (to 1888); Capital: Anakena	Widely recognized independent state to 1888. Annexed by the United Kingdom in 1888.
Romania; Capital: Bucharest: United Principalities of Romania (to 15 March 1881); Kingdom of Romania (from 15 March 1881)	Widely recognized independent state.
Rujumbura – Rujumbura Kingdom; Capital: Not specified	Widely recognized independent state.
Rukiga – Rukiga Kingdom; Capital: Not specified	Widely recognized independent state.
Russia – Russian Empire; Capital: Saint Petersburg	Widely recognized independent state.
Rwanda – Kingdom of Rwanda; Capital: Nyanza	Widely recognized independent state.
=== S ===
Samoa – Kingdom of Samoa; Capital: Apia	Widely recognized independent state.
San Marino – Most Serene Republic of San Marino; Capital: San Marino	Widely recognized independent state.
Sarawak – Kingdom of Sarawak (to 14 June 1888); Capital: Kuching	Widely recognized independent state to 14 June 1888. Annexed by the United Kingdom on 14 June 1888.
→ Serbia; Capital: Belgrade: Principality of Serbia (to 6 March 1882); Kingdom of Serbia (from 6 March 1882)	Widely recognized independent state.
Setul Mambang Segara – Kingdom of Setul Mambang Segara; Capital: Kota Mambang Segara	Widely recognized independent state.
(Thailand) Siam – Kingdom of Siam; Capital: Bangkok	Widely recognized independent state. The following are vassal states of Siam: Kedah (Vassal state); Luang Phrabang (Vassal state); Perlis (Vassal state)
Sokoto – Sokoto Caliphate; Capital: Sokoto	Widely recognized independent state.
Spain – Kingdom of Spain; Capital: Madrid	Widely recognized independent state. Spain had three colonies, and two possessions: (Spain) Elobey, Annobón and Corisco (Colony); (Spain) Fernando Po (Colony); (Spain) Río Muni (Colony); (Spain) Spanish North Africa (Possession); Spanish Sahara (Possession, from 26 December 1884)
Sulu – Sultanate of Sulu; Capital: Maimbung	Widely recognized independent state.
Sweden and Norway – United Kingdoms of Sweden and Norway; Capital: Stockholm, Christiania	Personal union of the separate kingdoms of Sweden and Norway.
Switzerland – Swiss Confederation; Capital: Bern	Widely recognized independent state. Switzerland was a federation of 25 cantons. (Note: 25 Cantons: Aargau, Appenzell Ausserrhoden, Appenzell Innerrhoden, Basel-Stadt, Basel-Landschaft, Bern, Fribourg, Geneva, Glarus, Graubünden, Lucerne, Neuchâtel, Nidwalden, Obwalden, Schaffhausen, Schwyz, Solothurn, St. Gallen, Thurgau, Ticino, Uri, Valais, Vaud, Zug, Zürich)
=== T ===
Tagant – Emirate of Tagant; Capital: Tidjikja	Widely recognized independent state.
Tahiti – Kingdom of Tahiti (to 29 June 1880); Capital: Tidjikja	Widely recognized independent state to 29 June 1880. Annexed by France on 29 June 1880.
Tonga – Kingdom of Tonga; Capital: Nuku'alofa	Widely recognized independent state.
Toucouleur – Toucouleur Empire; Capital: Segou	Widely recognized independent state.
Transvaal – South African Republic; Capital: Pretoria	Largely independent and widely recognized Boer republic under some degree of British suzerainty.
Trarza – Emirate of Trarza; Capital: Mederdra	Widely recognized independent state.
Tuggurt – Sultanate of Tuggurt (to 1881); Capital: Tuggurt	Widely recognized independent state to 1881. Annexed by France in 1881.
=== U ===
United Kingdom – United Kingdom of Great Britain and Ireland; Capital: London	Widely recognized independent state. The following are colonies, territories, dependencies and protectorates of the United Kingdom: (United Kingdom) Aden (Protectorate); Afghanistan (Protectorate under Treaty of Gandamak); (United Kingdom) Amoy (Concession); (United Kingdom) Ascension Island (Possession); Bahama Islands (Crown colony); Bahrain (Protectorate); (United Kingdom) Baker Island (Uninhabited possession); Barbados (Crown colony from 1885); (United Kingdom) Basutoland (Crown colony from March 18, 1884); (United Kingdom) Bechuanaland (Protectorate from March 31, 1885); Bermuda (Crown colony); (United Kingdom) Bights of Benin and Biafra (Protectorate); (United Kingdom) British Bechuanaland (Crown colony from September 30, 1885); (United Kingdom) British Arctic Territories (Territory until 1880); British Ceylon (Crown colony); (United Kingdom) → British Cyprus (Protectorate); British Guiana (Colony); British Honduras (Crown colony); British Hong Kong (Crown colony); British Jamaica (Crown colony); British Leeward Islands (Federal colony); British Mauritius (Crown colony); (United Kingdom) British Somaliland (Crown colony from 1884); British Trinidad and Tobago (Crown colony from 1888); British West Africa (Crown colony until November 28, 1888); (United Kingdom) → British Windward Islands (Crown colony); Brunei (Protectorate from September 17, 1888); Canada (Dominion); Cape Colony (Colony); Colony of Natal (Colony); (United Kingdom) Cook Islands (Protectorate from September 20, 1888); Falkland Islands (Crown colony); (United Kingdom) Friendly Islands (Tripartite protectorate); Gambia (Crown colony and protectorate from 1889); Gibraltar (Crown colony); Gold Coast (Crown colony from 1889); (United Kingdom) Graham Land (Uninhabited possession); Griqualand West (Colony to 1880); Guernsey (Crown dependency); (United Kingdom) Hankou (Concession); (United Kingdom) Heard Island and McDonald Islands (Uninhabited possession); (United Kingdom) Heligoland (Protectorate); (United Kingdom) → British Raj - Indian Empire (Crown colony); (United Kingdom) Isle of Man (Crown dependency); (United Kingdom) Jarvis Island (Uninhabited possession); Jersey (Crown dependency); (United Kingdom) Jiujiang (Concession); (United Kingdom) Kermadec Islands (Uninhabited possession, 1886–1887); (United Kingdom) Labuan (Protectorate); (United Kingdom) → Lagos (Colony); Maldive Islands (Protectorate); Malta (Crown colony); Manipur (Protectorate); Mosquito Coast (Under British influence); Nepal (Protectorate); Newfoundland (Crown colony); New South Wales (Colony); (United Kingdom) New Zealand (Colony); (United Kingdom) Niger Districts (Protectorate); North Borneo (Protectorate from May 12, 1888); (United Kingdom) Oil Rivers (Protectorate from 1884); → British New Guinea (Protectorate 1884–1888, colony from 1888); Rarotonga (Protectorate from 1888); (United Kingdom) Redonda (Possession); Rhodesia (Company Rule by British South Africa Company from 1888); Queensland (Colony); Saint Helena (Crown colony); Sarawak (Protectorate from June 14, 1888); Sierra Leone (Crown colony from 1889); South Australia (Colony); Straits Settlements (Crown colony); (United Kingdom) Suez Canal Zone (Crown colony from 1882); Tasmania (Colony); (United Kingdom) Tientsin (Concession); (United Kingdom) Tokelau (Protectorate from June 1889); (United Kingdom) Transvaal Colony (Crown colony until 1881); (United Kingdom) Trinidad (Colony until 1889); (United Kingdom) Tristan da Cunha (Crown colony); Trucial States (Protectorate); Unfederated Malay States; Kedah (Protectorate); Kelantan (Protectorate); Perlis (Protectorate); Terengganu (Protectorate); (United Kingdom) Union Islands (Protectorate from June 1889); Victoria (Colony); (United Kingdom) Victoria Land (Uninhabited possession); (United Kingdom) Walvis Bay (Protectorate until 1884); Western Australia (Colony); (United Kingdom) Zhenjiang (Concession); (United Kingdom) Zululand (Crown colony from 1887)
United States – United States of America; Capital: Washington D.C.	Widely recognized independent state. The following are territories of the United States of America: Alaska (Department until May 17, 1884 and District from May 17, 1884); Arizona (Territory); Bajo Nuevo Bank (Uninhabited territory); Dakota (Territory to November 2, 1889); Idaho (Territory); Indian Territory (Territory); Johnston Atoll (Uninhabited territory); Kingman Reef (Uninhabited territory); Middlebrook Island (Uninhabited territory); Midway Atoll (Uninhabited territory); Montana (Territory to November 8, 1889); Navassa Island (Uninhabited territory); New Mexico (Territory); Quita Sueño Bank (Uninhabited territory); Roncador Bank (Uninhabited territory); Serrana Bank (Uninhabited territory); Serranilla Bank (Uninhabited territory); Swan Islands (Uninhabited territory); (United States) Tientsin (Concession); Utah (Territory); Washington (Territory to November 11, 1889); Wyoming (Territory)
Upper Aulaqi Sheikhdom; Capital: Sa'id	Widely recognized independent state.
Upper Yafa – State of Upper Yafa; Capital: Mahjaba	Widely recognized independent state.
Uruguay – Eastern Republic of Uruguay; Capital: Montevideo	Widely recognized independent state.
=== V ===
Venezuela – United States of Venezuela; Capital: Caracas	Widely recognized independent state.
=== W ===
Wadai – Wadai Empire; Capital: Abéché	Widely recognized independent state.
Wahidi Balhaf – Wahidi Sultanate of Balhaf (until January 1889); Capital: Balhaf	Widely recognized independent state until January 1889. Joined the Aden Protectorate.
Wahidi Bir Ali – Wahidi Sultanate of Bir Ali; Capital: Bi'r `Ali	Widely recognized independent state.
Wahidi Haban – Wahidi Sultanate of Haban (until January 1889); Capital: Habban	Widely recognized independent state until January 1889. Joined the Aden Protectorate.
Wajoq – Kingdom of Wajoq; Capital: Tosora	Widely recognized independent state.
Wassoulou – Wassoulou Empire; Capital: Bissandugu	Widely recognized independent state.
Wituland – Witu Sultanate (to November 1885); Capital: Witu	Widely recognized independent state to 1885. Annexed by the United Kingdom in 1885.
Wolaita – Kingdom of Wolaita; Capital: Lasho, Dalbo, Sodo	Widely recognized independent state.
=== Y ===
Yamma – Kingdom of Yamma; Capital: Fofa	Widely recognized independent state.
Yeke – Yeke Kingdom; Capital: Bunkeya	Widely recognized independent state.
=== Z ===
Zabarma – Zabarma Emirate; Capital: Not specified	Widely recognized independent state.
Zanzibar – Sultanate of Zanzibar; Capital: Stone Town	Widely recognized independent state.
Zululand – Kingdom of Zulu (to 1887); Capital: Bulawayo	Widely recognized independent state to 1887. Annexed by the United Kingdom in 1887.
== States with limited independence, sovereignty or recognition ==
Aceh – Sultanate of Aceh; Capital: Kutaraja	Protectorate of the Ottoman Empire.
(United Kingdom) Aden – Aden Protectorate (Capital: Various)	British protectorate. The Aden Protectorate was made up of nine sheikdoms. (Note: Dhala (from January 1981), Kathiri (from January 1889), Lower Aulaqi (from January 1889), Lower Yafa, Mahra (from January 1887), Qu'aiti (from May 1888), Upper Aulaqi, Wahidi Balhaf (from January 1889) and Wahidi Haban (from January 1889).)
Bulungan – Sultanate of Bulungan (until 1880); Capital: Tanjung Palas	Vassal state of Sulu to 1880. Annexed by the Netherlands in 1880.
Canada – Dominion of Canada; Capital: Ottawa	Autonomous Dominion of the United Kingdom. Canada was largely represented by the UK internationally and had little recognition as an independent state. Canada was a federation made up of seven provinces and two territories. (Note: 7 provinces: British Columbia, New Brunswick, Nova Scotia, Manitoba, Ontario, Prince Edward Island and Quebec. 2 territories: Keewatin and the North-west Territories)
Champasak – Kingdom of Champasak; Capital: Champasak	Widely recognized independent state. Vassal state of Siam.
Counani – Republic of Independent Guiana (from 23 July 1886); Capital: Counani	Unrecognized state.
Dar al Kuti – Sultanate of Dar Al Kuti; Capital: N'Délé	Vassal state of Dar Runga.
Franceville – Independent Commune of Franceville (from 9 August 1889); Capital: None	Unrecognized state.
Goshen – State of Goshen (from 24 October 1882 to 6 August 1883); Capital: Rooigrond	Largely unrecognized Boer republic.
Goust – Republic of Goust; Capital: None	Unrecognized state.
Maldives – Sultanate of Maldive Islands (to 1887); Capital: Malé	De facto British protectorate. De jure protectorate from 1887.
Kano – Emirate of Kano; Capital: Takai	Vassal of the Sokoto Caliphate
Kongo – Kingdom of Kongo; Capital: Mbanza-Kongo	Vassal of the Kingdom of Portugal.
Nieuwe Republiek – New Republic (from 1884 to 1888); Capital: Vryheid	Largely unrecognized Boer republic from 1884 to 1888.
Saskatchewan – Provisional Government of Saskatchewan (from 19 March 1885 to 20 May 1885); Capital: Batoche	Unrecognized state, Provisional Government.
Sedang – Kingdom of Sedang (from 3 June 1888); Capital: Kon Gung	Unrecognized state from 3 June 1888.
Sikkim – Kingdom of Sikkim; Capital: Tumlong	De jure protectorate of Tibet under the Qing Dynasty. De facto protectorate of the British Raj.
→ Stellaland – Republic of Stellaland (from 26 July 1882, to 30 September 1885); Capital: Vryburg	Largely unrecognized Boer republic.
Upingtonia – Republic of Upingtonia (from 20 October 1885, to June 1887); Capital: Grootfontein	Largely unrecognized Boer republic to June 1887. Merged into German South-West Africa
Xibei San Ma; Capital: None	Unrecognized state.
Zheltuga – Zheltuga Republic (from 1883 to 1886); Capital: None	Unrecognized proto-state from 1883 to 1886.
