= Sheikhdom of al-ʽIrqa =

Sheikhdom of al-ʽIrqa مشيخة آل عرقة
- 19th century–1951
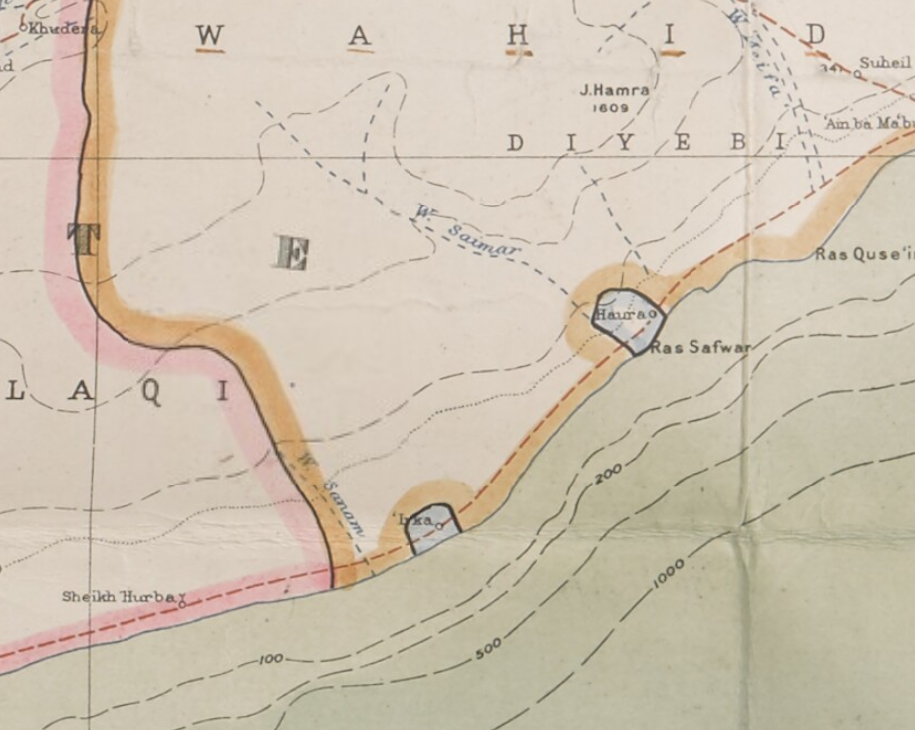
- Map of the Sheikhdoms of al-Hawra and al-ʽIrqa in 1926

- Irqa within modern Yemen
- Capital: Irqa (city-state)
- Religion: Islam
- Government: Sheikhdom
- Sheikh
  - bef. 1888 – 1901: `Awad ibn Muhammad Ba Das
  - 1901 – 1935: Ahmad ibn `Awad Ba Das
  - 1935 – 1951: Ahmad ibn `Abd Allah ibn `Abd Allah ibn `Awad Ba Das (last)
- History
  - Established: 19th century
  - British protectorate: 1890
  - Disestablished: 1951

Area
- 1946: 24.6 km^{2} (9.5 sq mi)

Population
  - 1946: 500
- Today part of: Yemen

The Sheikhdom of al-ʽIrqa (Arabic: مشيخة آل عرقة, romanized: Mashyakhat al-ʽIrqa) was a city-state which was part of the Protectorate of South Arabia, and existed from the 19th century to 1951.

== History ==
The Sheikhdom was established in the 19th century.

Starting in 1888, the Shaikh of Irqa received a stipend from the British Empire. A Protectorate Treaty was concluded with him in that year on 27 April, and was ratified on 26 February 1890.

Shaikh Awadh bin Muhammad ba Das died in January 1901. He was succeeded by Shaikh Ahmed bin Awadh bin Muhammad ba Das. A new Protectorate Treaty was concluded with the latter in January 1902, when his stipend was increased from 80 to 180 dollars.

Shaikh Ahmed bin Awadh ba Das died on 21 October 1935. His grandson, Ahmad ibn `Abd Allah ibn `Abd Allah ibn `Awad Ba Das, was elected as his successor the following day.

In c. 1951, Irqa was incorporated into Wahidi Balhaf.

== Rulers ==
The rulers of al-`Irqa bore the title Shaykh al-`Irqa.

=== Sheiks ===
1. `Awad ibn Muhammad Ba Das, bef. 27 April 1888 – 2 January 1901
2. Ahmad ibn `Awad Ba Das, 1901 – 21 October 1935
3. Ahmad ibn `Abd Allah ibn `Abd Allah ibn `Awad Ba Das, 22 October 1935 – 1951

== Demographics ==
In 1946, the Sheikhdom of al-`Irqa had a population of 500.

== Geography ==
A report in 1946 described al-`Irqa as a "small fishing village".
