= Wahidi Bir Ali =

Coordinates: 14°01′30″N 48°20′31″E

Wahidi Sultanate of Bir ‘Ali سلطنة واحدي بير علي
- State of the Federation of South Arabia
- 1830–1967
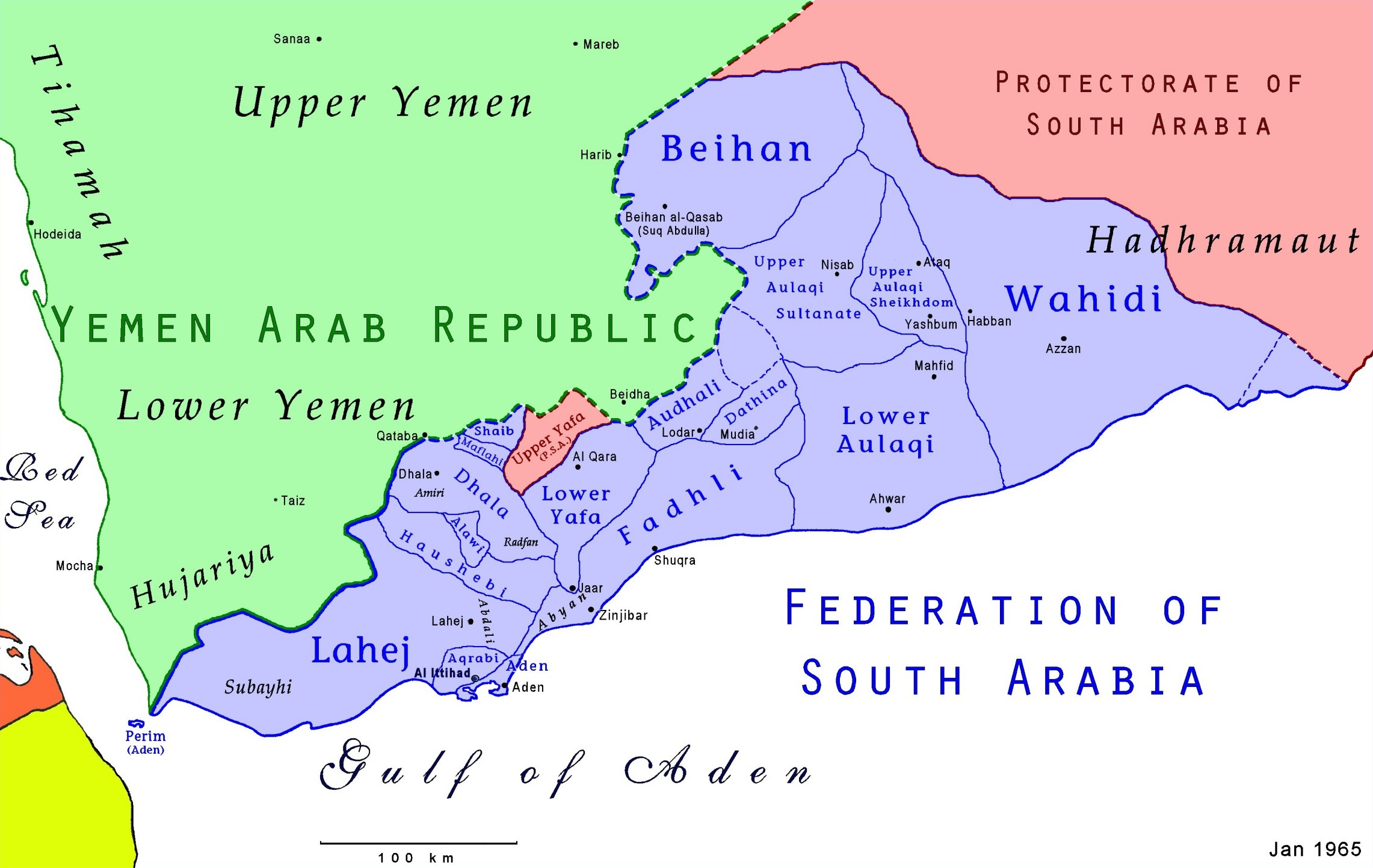
- Map of the Federation of South Arabia
- Capital: Bi'r `Ali
  - Type: Sultanate
- Historical era: 20th century
  - Established: 1830
  - Disestablished: 1967
Preceded by	Succeeded by
Federation of Arab Emirates of the South	South Yemen

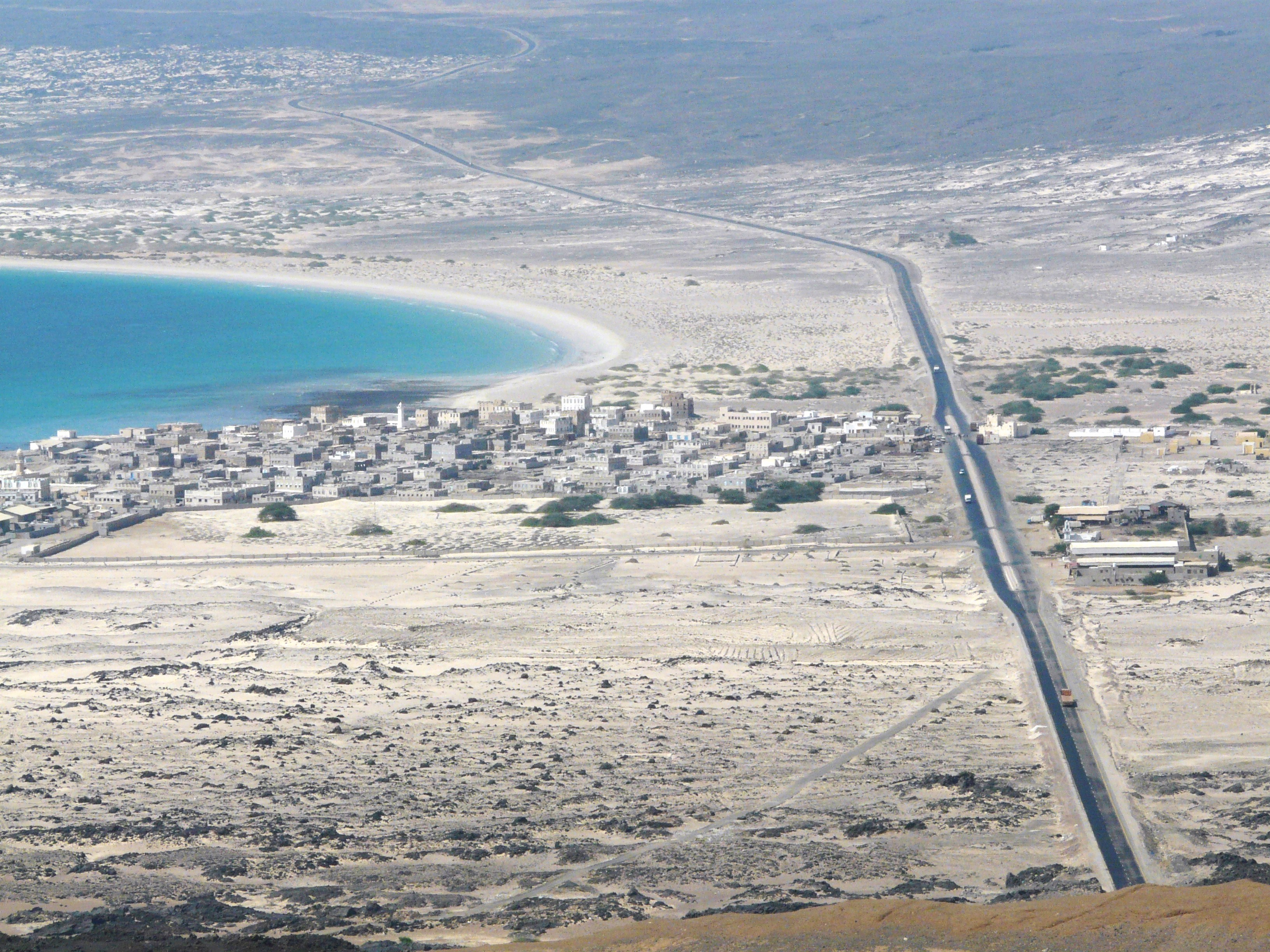
Bir Ali, between Shabwah and Mukalla

Wahidi Bir Ali (Arabic: واحدي بير علي Wāḥidī Bīr ‘Alī), or the Wahidi Sultanate of Bir Ali (Arabic: سلطنة واحدي بير علي Salṭanat al-Wāḥidī Bīr ‘Alī), was one of several Wahidi states in the British Aden Protectorate and the Protectorate of South Arabia. Its capital was Bi'r `Ali on the Gulf of Aden coast. The last Sultan, Alawi ibn Salih ibn Ahmad Al Wahidi, was deposed and the state was abolished in 1967 upon the founding of the People's Republic of South Yemen. The area is now part of the Republic of Yemen.

== History ==
The predecessor state, the Wahidi Sultanate (Saltanat al-Wahidiyya), was established at an uncertain date. In 1830 the Wahidi Sultanate split into four states:

- Wahidi Sultanate of Ba´l Haf (Saltanat Ba al-Haf al-Wahidiyya)
- Wahidi Sultanate of `Azzan (Saltanat `Azzan al-Wahidiyya)
- Wahidi Sultanate of Bi´r `Ali `Amaqin (Saltanat Bi'r `Ali `Amaquin al-Wahidiyya)
- Wahidi Sultanate of Habban (Saltanat Habban al-Wahidiyya)

On 4 May 1881 Ba´l Haf and `Azzan joined. In 1888 the Wahidi Sultanate of Ba´l Haf and `Azzan became a British protectorate. In 1895 Bi´r `Ali `Amaqin also came under British protection. On 23 Oct 1962 the joint sultanate was renamed Wahidi Sultanate (al-Saltana al-Wahidiyya), while Bi´r `Ali and Habban sultanates became subordinate sultanates. On 29 Nov 1967 with the independence of the People's Republic of South Yemen all states were abolished.

=== Rulers ===
The Sultans of the Wahidi Sultanate of Bi´r `Ali `Amaqin had the style of Sultan Bi'r `Ali `Amaqi al-Wahidi.

==== Sultans ====
- 1830 - 18.. `Abd Allah ibn Talib al-Wahidi
- 1842 - 1875 al-Hadi ibn Talib al-Wahidi
- 1875 - 1880 Talib ibn al-Hadi al-Wahidi
- 1880 - Mar 1893 Muhsin ibn Salih al-Wahidi
- 1893 - 1916 Salih ibn Ahmad al-Wahidi
- 1916 - 1940 Nasir ibn Talib al-Wahidi
- 1940 - 1955 `Alawi ibn Muhsin al-Wahidi
- 1955 - 23 Oct 1962 `Alawi ibn Salih al-Wahidi (continued as subordinate ruler until 29 Nov 1967)

== See also ==
- Aden Protectorate
