= Gulf of Aden =

Gulf between the Horn of Africa and Yemen in the Arabian Peninsula

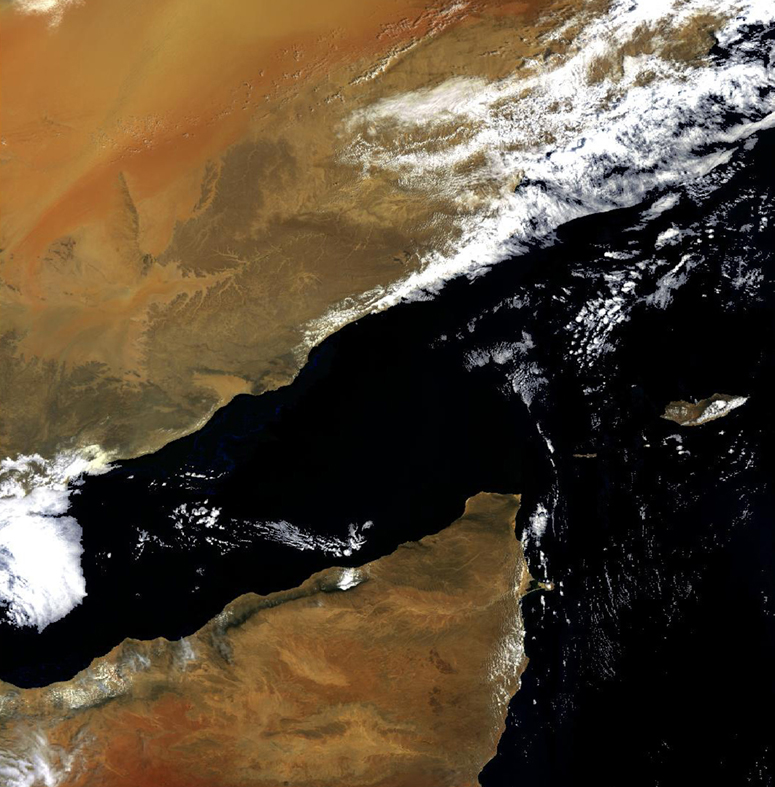
- The Gulf of Aden from space
- Interactive map of Gulf of Aden
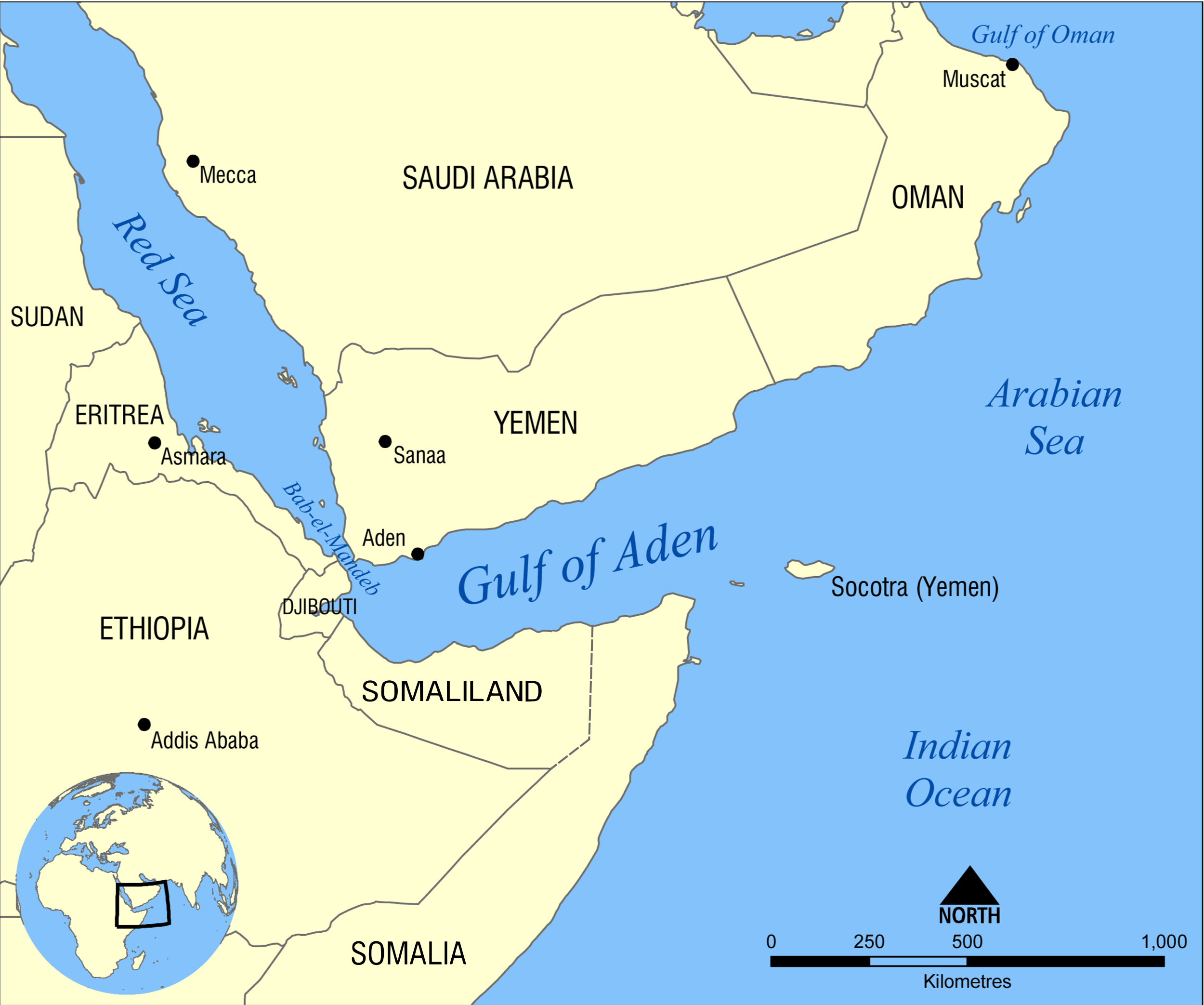
- The Gulf of Aden, as viewed from space (top) and on a map (bottom)
- Location: East Africa and West Asia
- Coordinates: 12°N 48°E
- Type: Gulf
- Basin countries: List: Djibouti; Somalia; Yemen; 1 de facto: Somaliland
- Surface area: 410,000 km^{2} (160,000 sq mi)
- Average depth: 500 m (1,600 ft)
- Max. depth: 2,700 m (8,900 ft)
- Max. temperature: 28 °C (82 °F)
- Min. temperature: 15 °C (59 °F)
- Settlements: Berbera Djibouti Aden

The Gulf of Aden (Arabic: خليج عدن; Somali: Gacanka Cadmeed) is a deepwater gulf of the Indian Ocean between Yemen to the north, the Arabian Sea to the east, Djibouti to the west, and the Guardafui Channel, the Socotra Archipelago, Puntland in Somalia and Somaliland to the south. In the northwest, it connects with the Red Sea through the Bab-el-Mandeb strait, and it connects with the Arabian Sea to the east. To the west, it narrows into the Gulf of Tadjoura in Djibouti. The Aden Ridge lies along the middle of the gulf, and tectonic activity at the ridge is causing the gulf to widen by about 15 mm (0.59 in) per year.

The ancient Greeks regarded the gulf as one of the most important parts of the "Erythraean Sea". It later came to be dominated by Muslims, as the area around the gulf converted to Islam. From the late 1960s onwards, there was an increased Soviet naval presence in the Gulf. The importance of the Gulf of Aden declined while the Suez Canal was closed, but it was revitalized when the canal was reopened in 1975, after being deepened and widened by the Egyptian government.

The waterway is part of the important Suez Canal shipping route between the Mediterranean Sea and the Arabian Sea in the Indian Ocean, with 21,000 ships crossing the gulf annually. This route is often used for the delivery of Persian Gulf oil, making the gulf an integral waterway in the world economy. Important cities along the Gulf of Aden include the namesake Aden in Yemen. Other Yemeni cities are Zinjibar, Shuqrah, Ahwar, Balhaf, Mukalla, Ash-Shihr, al-Hami, Hadibu, and Qulensya. On the African side are the cities of Djibouti, Berbera and Bosaso.

Despite a lack of large-scale commercial fishing facilities, the coastline supports many isolated fishing towns and villages. The Gulf of Aden is richly supplied with fish, turtles, and lobsters. Local fishing takes place close to the shore; sardines, tuna, kingfish, and mackerel make up the bulk of the annual catches. Crayfish and sharks are also fished locally.

== Historical names ==
In antiquity, the ancient Greeks viewed what is now called the Gulf of Aden as an extension of the Erythraean Sea (Red Sea) Ancient Greek: Ἐρυθρὰ Θάλασσα, Erythrà Thálassa. They named several of the islands in the gulf, including one they called Stratonis, although it is no longer clear which Greek name referred to which island.

In Abu'l-Fida's A Sketch of the Countries (Arabic: تقويم البلدان), the present-day Gulf of Aden was called the Gulf of Berbera, which shows how important Berbera was in both regional and international trade during the medieval period.

Legendary navigator Ibn Majid also referred to the Gulf of Aden as the Gulf of Berbera in his 15th century magnum opus The Book of the Benefits of the Principles and Foundations of Seamanship. Berbera has been a prominent port since antiquity.

== Maritime Distance Between Ports ==
- Berbera Port - Port of Shenzen 9,484 km
- Djibouti Port - Port of Barcelona 5,989 km
- Port of Aden - Port OF Mumbai 3,190 km
- Berbera Port - Port of Savanna Georgia USA 8,300 km
- Djibouti Port - Port of Karachi 2,726 km
- Port of Aden - Port of Perth 9,366 km

== Geography ==
=== Limits ===
The International Hydrographic Organization defines the limits of the Gulf of Aden as follows:

On the northwest – the southern limit of the Red Sea [a line joining Hisn Murad (12°40′N 43°30′E) and Ras Siyyan (12°29′N 43°20′E)]

On the east – the meridian of Cape Guardafui

The Gulf of Tadjoura is part of the Gulf of Aden, forming its western end.

=== Hydrography ===
The temperature of the Gulf of Aden varies between 15 and 28 °C (59 and 82 °F), depending on the season and the monsoons. The salinity of the gulf at 10 metres (33 ft) depth varies from 35.3‰ along the eastern Somali coast to as high as 37.3‰ in the gulf's centre, while its oxygen content at the same depth is typically between 4.0 and 5.0 mg/L.

== Exclusive economic zone ==
Exclusive economic zones in Gulf of Aden:

Number	Country	Area (Km^{2})
1	Yemen	509,240
2	Somalia and Somaliland	831,059
3	Djibouti	7,037
Total	Gulf of Aden	1,347,336

== Economy ==
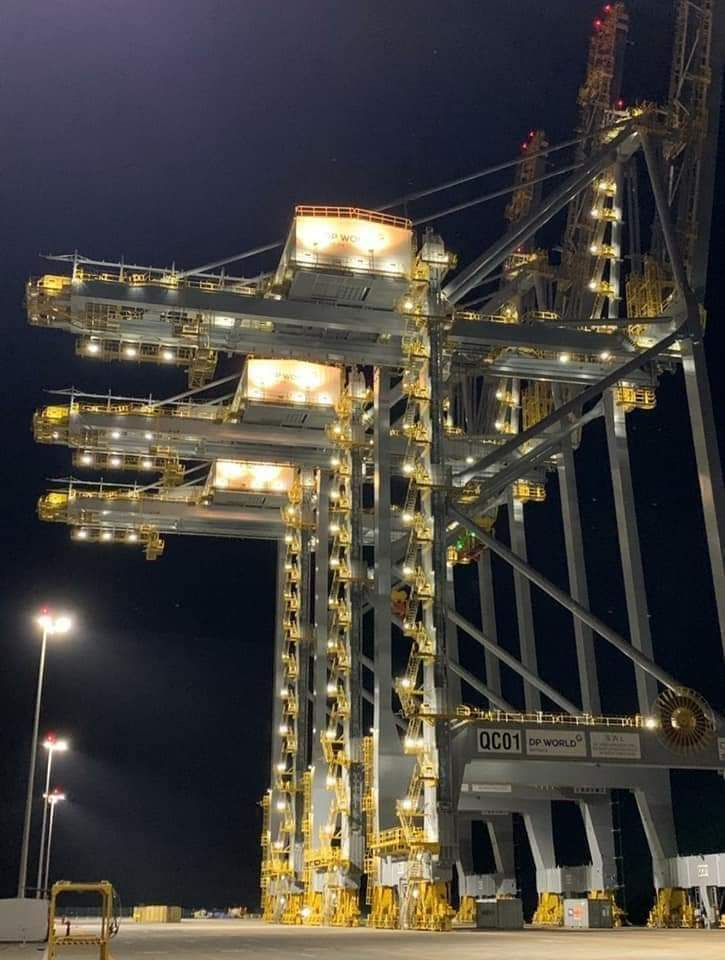
Somaliland DP world Berbera Port Berbera

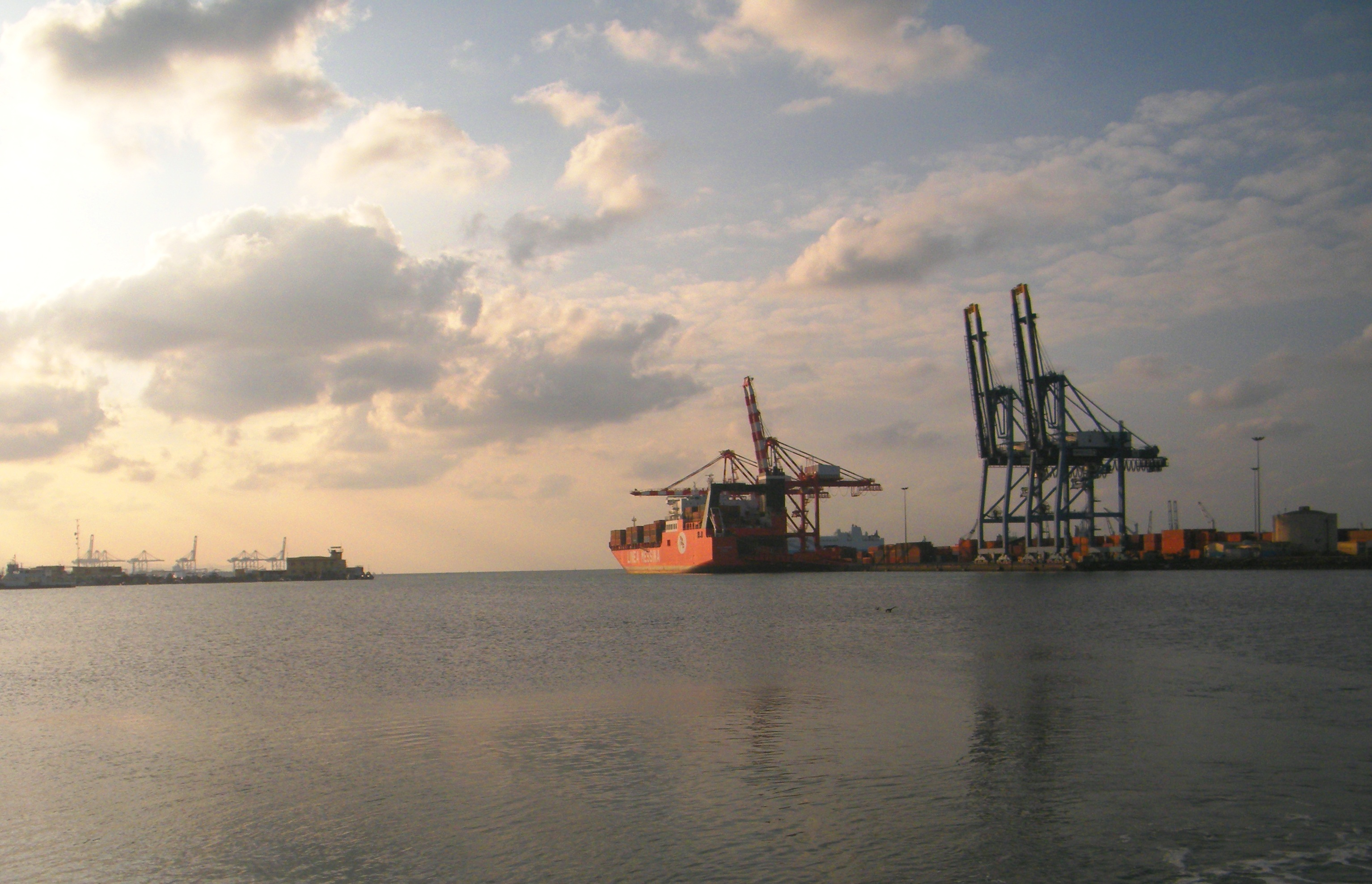
Djibouti Port

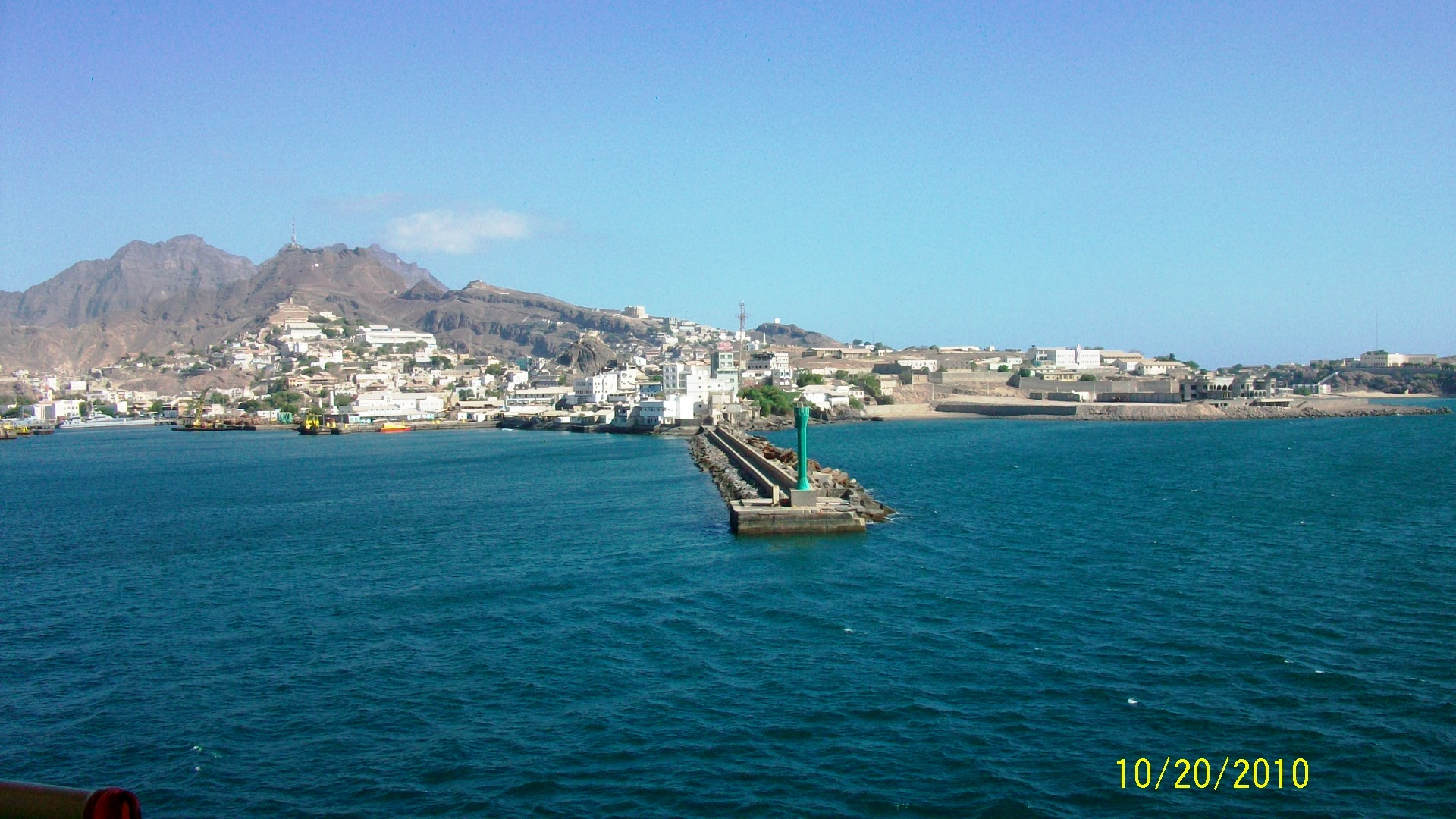
Yemen Aden Port

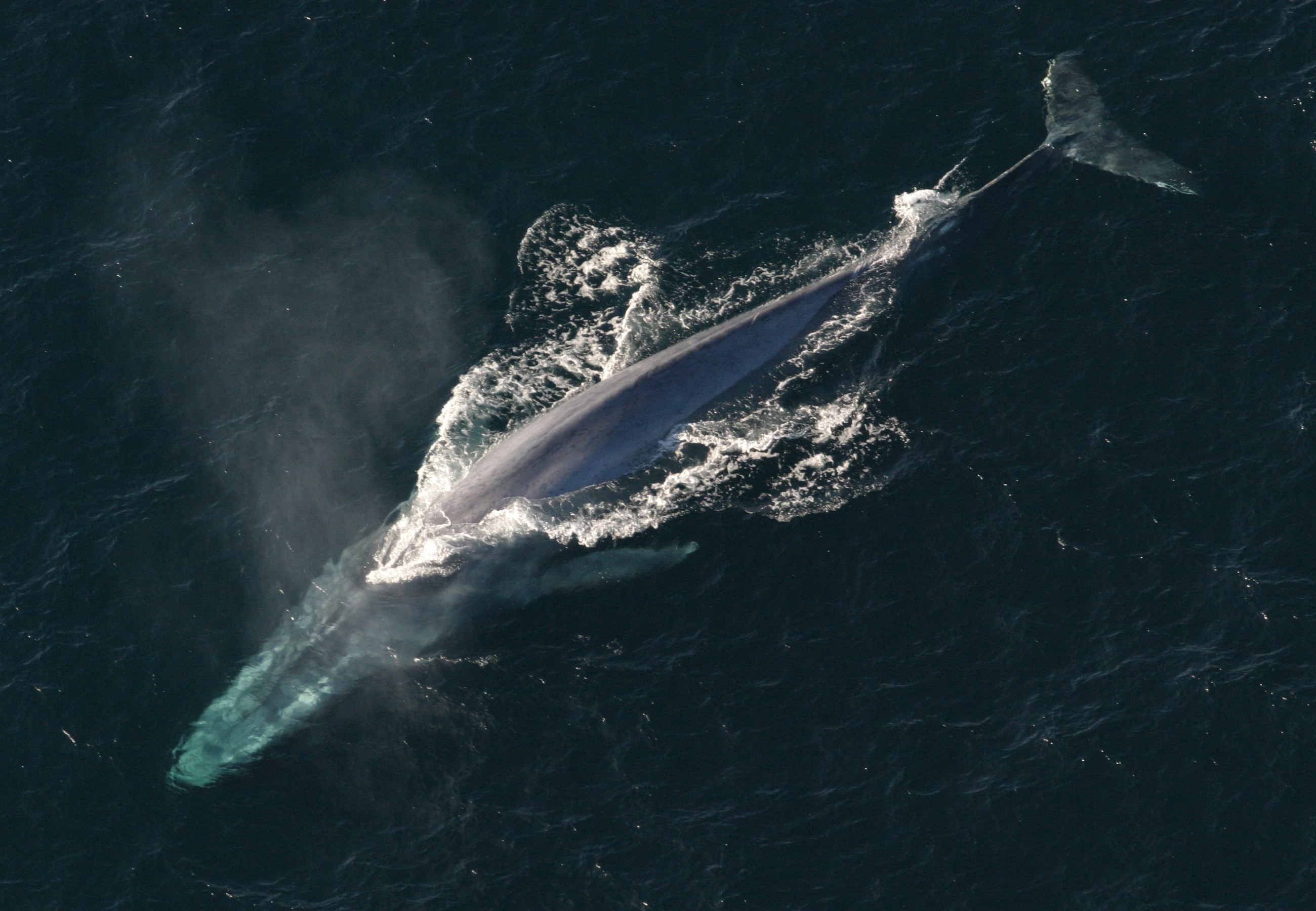
Blue whales are common in gulf of Aden

The Gulf of Aden is a vital waterway for shipping, especially for Persian Gulf oil, making it an integral waterway in the world economy. Approximately 11% of the world's seaborne petroleum passes through the Gulf of Aden on its way to the Suez Canal or to regional refineries. The main ports along the gulf are Aden, Balhaf, Bir Ali, Mukalla, and Shokra in Yemen; Djibouti City in Djibouti; Zeila and Berbera in Somaliland, and Bosaso in Somalia.

In antiquity, the gulf was a thriving area of international trade between Ptolemaic Egypt and Rome in the west and Classical India, its Indonesian colonies, and Han China in the east. It was not limited to transshipment, as Yemeni incense, tortoiseshell, and other goods were in high demand in both directions. After Egyptian sailors discovered the monsoon winds and began to trade directly with India, caravan routes and their associated kingdoms began to collapse, leading to a rise in piracy in the area. The 1st-century Periplus of the Erythraean Sea documents one Egyptian captain's experiences during this era.

After the collapse of the Roman economy, direct trade ceased but the Awsan I port Crater, located just south of the modern city of Aden, remained an important regional centre. In late antiquity and the early medieval period, there were several invasions of Yemen from Ethiopia; after the rise of Islam, the gulf permitted repeated migrations of northwest Africa by Arab settlers.

In the first decade of the 2000s, especially during the war in Somalia, the gulf evolved into a hub of pirate activity. By 2013, attacks in the waters had steadily declined due to private security and international navy patrols. India receives US$50 billion in imports—and sends US$60 billion in exports—through this area annually. To protect its trade and that of other countries, India keeps a warship escort in the area.

== Ecology ==
A geologically young body of water, the Gulf of Aden has a unique biodiversity that includes many varieties of fish, coral, seabirds and invertebrates. This rich ecological diversity has benefited from a relative lack of pollution by humans in the past. However, environmental groups fear that the lack of a coordinated effort to control pollution may jeopardize the gulf's ecosphere. Whales, dolphins, and dugongs were once common before being severely reduced by commercial hunts, including by mass illegal hunts by the Soviet Union and Japan in the 1960s and 1970s. The now critically endangered Arabian humpback whales were once seen here in large numbers, but only a few large whales still appear in the gulf waters, including Bryde's whales, blue whales, and deep-sea toothed whales such as sperm whales and tropical bottlenose whales.

== See also ==
- Maritime Security Patrol Area
- International fleet of vessels in the Gulf of Aden
