= Wahidi Haban =

C. 1640 – 1967 state in modern Yemen

Coordinates: 14°42′N 45°44′E

Wahidi Sultanate of Habban in Hadhramaut سلطنة الواحدي حبان حضرموت
- State of the Federation of South Arabia
- 1830–1967
- Flag

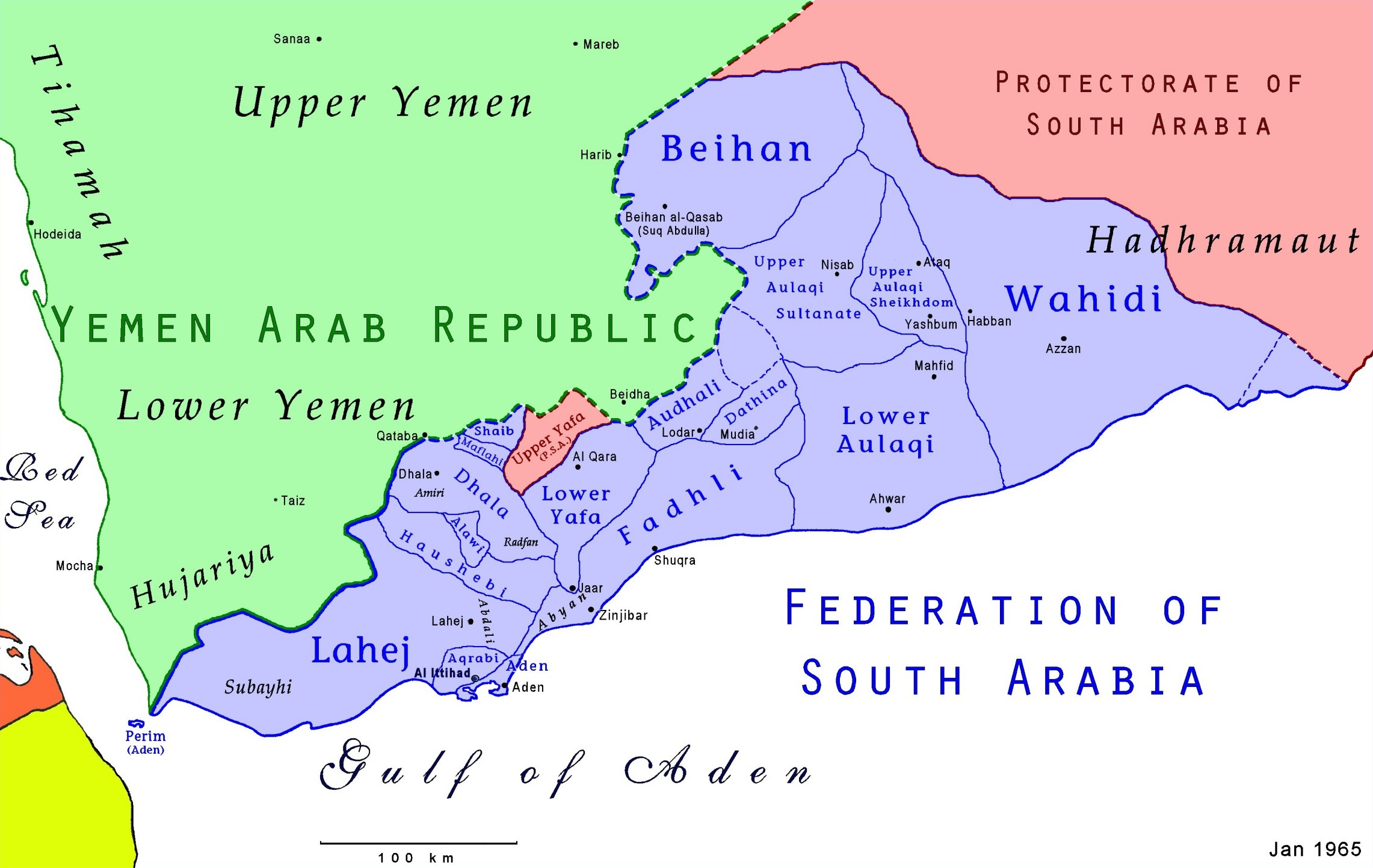
- Map of the Federation of South Arabia
- Capital: Habban
- Government
  - Type: Sultanate
- Historical era: 20th century
  - Established: 1830
  - Disestablished: 1967
Succeeded by
South Yemen

Wahidi Habban (Arabic: واحدي حبان Wāḥidī Ḥabbān), or the Wahidi Sultanate of Habban in Hadhramaut (Arabic: سلطنة الواحدي حبان حضرموت Salṭanat al-Wāḥidī Ḥabbān Ḥaḍramawt), was one of several Wahidi states in the British Aden Protectorate. Its capital was Habban. The last sultan, Husayn ibn Abd Allah Al Wahidi, was deposed and the state was abolished in 1967 upon the founding of the People's Republic of South Yemen. The area is now part of the Republic of Yemen.

== History ==
The predecessor state, the Wahidi Sultanate (Saltanat al-Wahidiyya), was established at an uncertain date. In 1830 the Wahidi Sultanate split into four states:

- Wahidi Sultanate of Ba´l Haf (Saltanat Ba al-Haf al-Wahidiyya)
- Wahidi Sultanate of `Azzan (Saltanat `Azzan al-Wahidiyya)
- Wahidi Sultanate of Bi´r `Ali `Amaqin (Saltanat Bi'r `Ali `Amaquin al-Wahidiyya)
- Wahidi Sultanate of Habban (Saltanat Habban al-Wahidiyya)

On 4 May 1881 Ba´l Haf and `Azzan joined. In 1888 the Wahidi Sultanate of Ba´l Haf and `Azzan became a British protectorate. In 1895 Bi´r `Ali `Amaqin also came under British protection. On 23 Oct 1962 the joint sultanate was renamed Wahidi Sultanate (al-Saltana al-Wahidiyya), while Bi´r `Ali and Habban sultanates became subordinate sultanates. On 29 Nov 1967 with the independence of the People's Republic of South Yemen all states were abolished.

=== Rulers ===
The Sultans of the Wahidi Sultanate of Habban had the style of Sultan Habban al-Wahidi.

==== Sultans ====
- 1830 - 1840 al-Husayn ibn Ahmad al-Wahidi
- 1850 - 1870 `Abd Allah ibn al-Husayn al-Wahidi
- 1870 - 1877 Ahmad ibn al-Husayn al-Wahidi
- 1877 - May 1881 Salih ibn Ahmad al-Wahidi
- May 1881 - Jan 1885 Interregnum
- Jan 1885 - 1919 Nasir ibn Salih al-Wahidi
- 1919 - 19.. al-Husayn ibn `Ali al-Wahidi
- c.1962 - 23 Oct 1962 al-Husayn ibn `Abd Allah al-Wahidi (continued as subordinate ruler until 29 Nov 1967)

== See also ==
- Aden Protectorate
