= Wahidi Balhaf =

Wahidi state in the British Aden Protectorate

Coordinates: 13°58′N 48°11′E

Wahidi Sultanate of Balhaf in Hadhramaut سلطنة الواحدي في بالحاف
- State of the Federation of South Arabia
- 1830–1967
- Flag

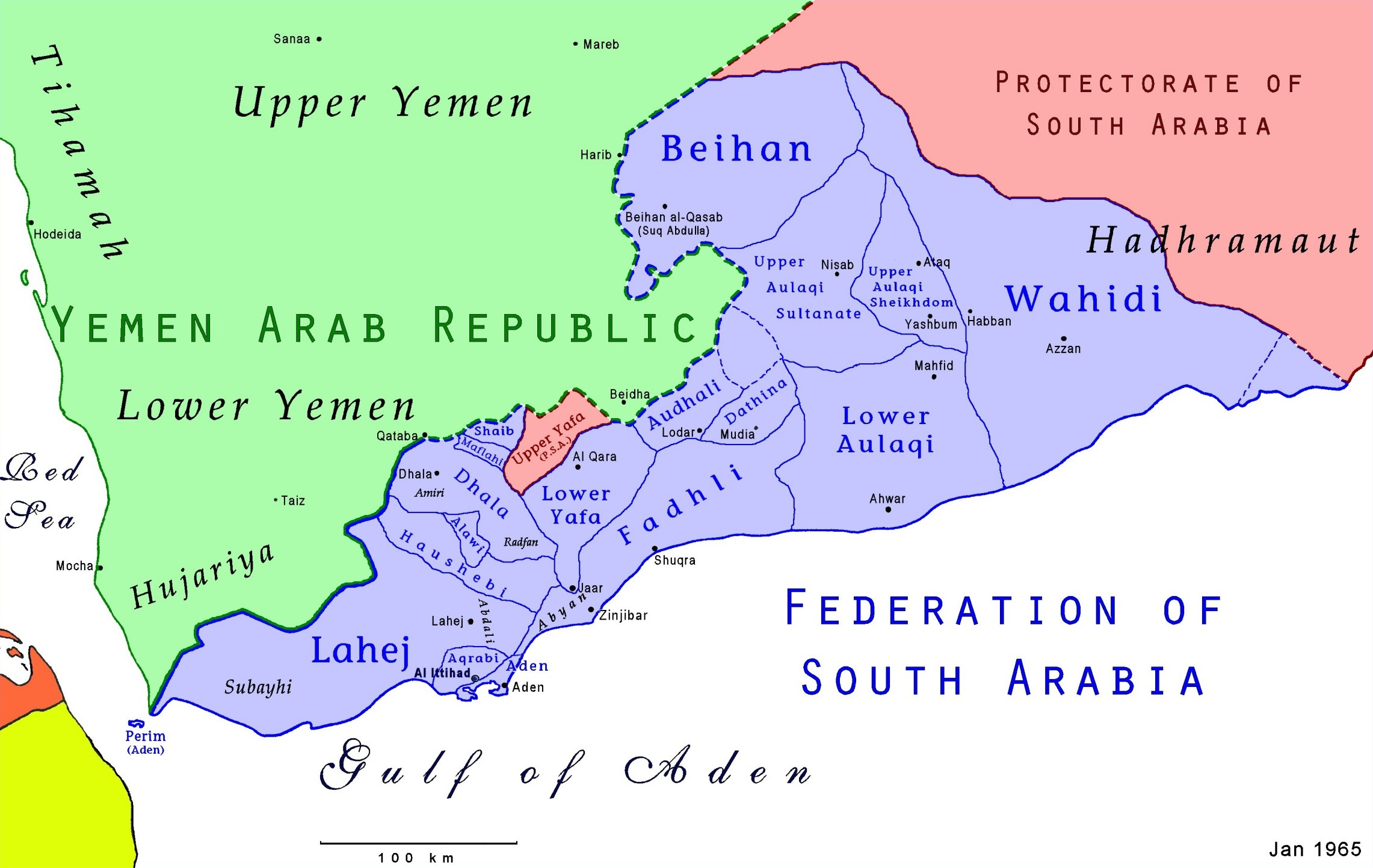
- Map of the Federation of South Arabia
- Capital: Balhaf
  - Type: Sultanate
- Historical era: 20th century
  - Established: 1830
  - Disestablished: 1967
Preceded by	Succeeded by
Federation of Arab Emirates of the South	South Yemen

Wahidi Balhaf (Arabic: واحدي بالحاف Wāḥidī Bālḥāf), or the Wahidi Sultanate of Balhaf in Hadhramaut (Arabic: سلطنة الواحدي في بالحافSalṭanat al-Wāḥidī Bālḥāf AlḤaḍramiyah), was one of several Wahidi states in the British Aden Protectorate. It was previously part of the Federation of Arab Emirates of the South, and then of its successor, the Federation of South Arabia when it was known simply as Wahidi.

Its capital was Balhaf on the Gulf of Aden coast and it included the inland town of Azzan (formerly the seat of a separate Wahidi Sultanate of Azzan). The Sultanate was abolished in 1967 upon the founding of the People's Republic of South Yemen and is now part of the Republic of Yemen.

== History ==
The predecessor state, the Wahidi Sultanate (Saltanat al-Wahidiyya), was established at an uncertain date. In 1830 the Wahidi Sultanate split into four states:

- Wahidi Sultanate of Ba´l Haf (Saltanat Ba al-Haf al-Wahidiyya)
- Wahidi Sultanate of `Azzan (Saltanat `Azzan al-Wahidiyya)
- Wahidi Sultanate of Bi´r `Ali `Amaqin (Saltanat Bi'r `Ali `Amaquin al-Wahidiyya)
- Wahidi Sultanate of Habban (Saltanat Habban al-Wahidiyya)

On 4 May 1881 Ba´l Haf and `Azzan joined.

In the beginning of 1882 Izzat Pasha was appointed Turkish Governor-General of Yemen, and, on his way from Baghdad to Hodeida to take up his appointment, visited Balahaf and Bir Ali. No agreement of any kind was concluded between him and the Sultan of Balahaf; but Nasir bin Abdulla, one of the Sultans of Balahaf, apprehensive that Balahaf might be annexed by the Qu'aiti, obtained a Turkish flag, which was to be hoisted every Friday and on the approach of a foreign vessel. The Wahidi Sultan of Habban and Azzan, while denying all complicity in the matter, stated his inability to prevent the Sultan's of Balahaf from flying the Turkish flag, and proclaimed his readiness to go against them with British aid.

Subsequently, the Wahidi Sultan and the Sultans of Bir Ali, Balahaf and Majdaha all wrote almost identical letters to the Resident, praying for British protection.

From the correspondence which took place in connection with this incident, it appeared that the then Wahidi Sultan of Habban and Azzan had little, if any, control over Bir Ali, Balahaf and Majdaha.

Abdulla bin Umar of Habban and Azzan was dethroned in 1885, when Hadi bin Salih of Balahaf was made the principal Sultan and the Wahidi were practically united under one ruler; though the title of Sultan continued to be borne by several subordinate Chiefs belonging to the ruling family.

It was eventually decided to enter into closer relations with the Wahidi, and with this view Protectorate Treaties similar to that executed by the Sultan of Soqotra, were concluded in 1888 with the Sultans of Bir Ali and Balahaf. Annual stipends of 120 dollars each were at the same time granted to Sultan Muhsin bin Salih of Bir Ali and Sultan Hadi bin Salih of Balahaf.

In 1892 Sultan Hadi bin Salib of Balaliaf resigned the Sultanate in favour of his younger brother, Muhsin bin Salih. The Government sanctioned this arrangement, and continued the stipend to Mullein bib Salih.

In 1893 Sultan Muhsin bin Salih of Bir Ali died, and was succeeded by Sultan Salih bin Ahmed, the usual annual stipend being continued to him. During this year Sultan Muhsin bin Salih of Balaliaf displayed a refractory spirit and intrigued with foreign powers. He was driven from Habban by his tribesmen, but he still continued his intrigues, for participation in which his brother, Ahmed bin Salih, was imprisoned at Aden. In the meantime another of the Sultans of Balahaf, Salih bin Abdulla, was elected Wahidi Sultan; but he was overawed by the ex-Sultan's threats, and intimidated by the ex-Sultan's brother, Husein bin Salih, from hoisting the British flag. A small force was therefore sent to Balahaf in November 1894 in H. M. S. Bramble and the R. I. M. S. Dalhousie, which brought back Sultan Salih bin Abdulla on a visit to the Resident and Husein bin Salih as a prisoner.

In March 1895 a Protectorate Treaty was concluded with Sultan Salih bin Abdulla, by which his stipend was increased to 300 dollars. Husein bin Salih and Ahmed bin Salih were released.

On 1 June 1896 an amended Protectorate Treaty was concluded with the Sultan of Bir Ali and his stipend increased to 360 dollars.

During 1901 the Wahid i complained of Qaiti intrigues and asked for British protection. The Wahidi Shaikhs also requested that Muhsin bin Salih, the ex-Sultan, might be recognised as titular chief; but their request was refused.

In 1902 Muhsin bin Salih plundered a Qaiti sambuk containing specie. The Resident, proceeded to Balhaf with a small force and, as Muhsin bin Salih failed to give up the plunder, the fort at Balaliaf was demolished, and the Resident returned to Aden, bringing with him Sultan Ahmed bin Salih, Muhsin's brother, as a political prisoner. The port was closed against all shipping. In October the specie was restored, but it was not until December 1904 that Sultan Muhsin bin Salih came into Aden and tendered his submission, when he was forgiven his past misdeeds. His brother was released, and he was recognised as Sultan of the Wahidi of Balhaf in the place of Sultan Salih bin Abdulla, who had proved himself a weak and inefficient ruler and had gained the disapprobation of his tribe and the censure of Government by an attempt to part with his share of the. port of Balahaf to the Sultan of Sliihr and Mukalla. On the occasion of Sultan Muhsin's recognition the opportunity was taken to reaffirm with him the Protectorate Treaty of 1895.

The ex-Sultan Salih bin Abdulla quarrelled with Sultan Mulisin bin Salih over his share in the port dues of Balhaf, and in 1906 asked the Resident to interfere on his behalf, which the latter declined to do.

Sultan Nasir bin Salih of Habban in the same year made overtures for a separate treaty, but these were not accepted.

In 1910 an agreement was concluded between Sultan Muhsin bin Salih and Sultan Ghalib bin Umar, the Qaiti, by which the former agreed to allow the latter to use his territory for the passage of troops and warlike materials, and for commercial purposes. It has, however, never been referred to by either party and is now considered a dead letter.

In June 1918 the two eldest sons off Sultan Muhsin bin Salih, Ali and Abdulla, received employment as Officers (Mulazim) in the 1st Yemen Infantry. In October 1918 Major M. C. Lake, Commandant of the 1st Yemen Infantry, accompanied by a Medical Officer and these two, Ali and Abdulla, visited Azzan for the purpose of obtaining a recruiting connection with the Aulaqi and Abdul Wahid tribes. He was accorded a warm welcome and hospitably received.

Sultan Muhsin died in January 1919 and was succeeded by his younger son, Ali bin Muhsin bin Salih (who, with his brother Abdulla, resigned his appointment in the 1st Yemen Infantry) to whom the Government of India continued the monthly stipend of 30 dollars paid to his father.

In 1930 Sultan All bin Mulisin became mentally deranged and though still nominally the Chief of the tribe, his brother, Abdulla, acts for him.

On 23 Oct 1962 the joint sultanate was renamed Wahidi Sultanate (al-Saltana al-Wahidiyya), while Bi´r `Ali and Habban remained subordinate sultanates. On 29 Nov 1967 with the independence of the People's Republic of South Yemen all states were abolished.

== Rulers ==
=== Wahidi Sultanate of Ba´l Haf ===
The Sultans of the Wahidi Sultanate had the title of Sultan al-Wahidi.

==== Sultans ====
- c.1640 - 1670 Salih ibn Nasir al-Wahidi
- c.1670 - 1706 al-Hadi ibn Salih al-Wahidi
- 1706 - 1766 al-Hasan ibn al-Hadi al-Wahidi
- 1766 - 1771 al-Husayn ibn al-Hasan al-Wahidi
- 1771 - 1771 Sa`id ibn al-Hasan al-Wahidi
- 1771 - 1810 Ahmad ibn al-Hadi al-Wahidi
- 1810 - 1830 `Abd Allah ibn Ahmad al-Wahidi

=== Wahidi Sultanate of Ba´l Haf ===
The Sultans of the Wahidi Sultanate of Ba´l Haf had the title of Sultan Ba al-Haf al-Wahidi.

==== Sultans ====
- .... - .... Nasir ibn `Abd Allah
- .... - .... Ahmad ibn Nasir
- .... - .... Muhsin ibn `Ali
- .... - .... al-Husayn ibn `Abd Allah
- .... - .... `Abd Allah ibn al-Husayn
- .... - 1877 Ahmad ibn al-Husayn al-Wahidi
- 1877 - 1881 Salih ibn Ahmad
- 1881 - 4 May 1881 `Umar ibn al-Husayn al-Wahidi

=== Wahidi Sultanate of `Azzan ===
Sultans of the Wahidi Sultanate of `Azzan; title Sultan `Azzan al-Wahidi.

- 1830 - 18.. `Ali ibn Ahmad al-Wahidi
- 1850 - 1870 Muhsin ibn `Ali al-Wahidi
- 1870 - May 1881 `Abd Allah ibn `Umar al-Wahidi

=== Wahidi Sultanate of Ba´l Haf and `Azzan ===
Sultans of the Wahidi Sultanate of Ba´l Haf and `Azzan (from 1962 Wahidi Sultanate). Title Sultan Ba al-Haf wa `Azzan al-Wahidi; from 23 Oct 1962 Sultan al-Saltana al-Wahidiyya.

==== Sultans ====
- May 1881 - Jan 1885 `Abd Allah ibn `Umar
- 15 Jan 1885 - 1892 al-Hadi ibn Salih al-Wahidi
- Ju 1892 - 1893 Muhsin ibn Salih al-Wahidi (1st time)
- 1893 - 1904 Salih ibn `Abd Allah al-Wahidi
- 14 Dec 1904 - Jan 1919 Muhsin ibn Salih al-Wahidi (2nd time)
- Jan 1919 - 1948 `Ali ibn al-Husayn al-Wahidi
- 1948 - 1948 `Ali ibn Muhsin al-Wahidi (uncertain)
- 1948 - 19 Feb 1967 Nasir ibn `Abd Allah al-Wahidi

==== Regent (title Hakim) ====
- 20 Feb 1967 - Aug 1967 `Ali ibn Muhammad ibn Sa`id al-Wahidi

== See also ==
- Aden Protectorate
