= Irqa =

ʽIrqa العرقة
- Location in Yemen
- Coordinates: 13.6485°N 47.3516°E
- Country: Yemen
- Governorate: Shabwah Governorate

ʽIrqa (Arabic: العرقة) is a village in the Shabwah Governorate in Yemen. In the 19th and 20th centuries, it was an independent city-state known as the Sheikhdom of al-`Irqa. In December 2011, during the Yemeni Revolution, it was the site of an ambush.
