= Balhaf =

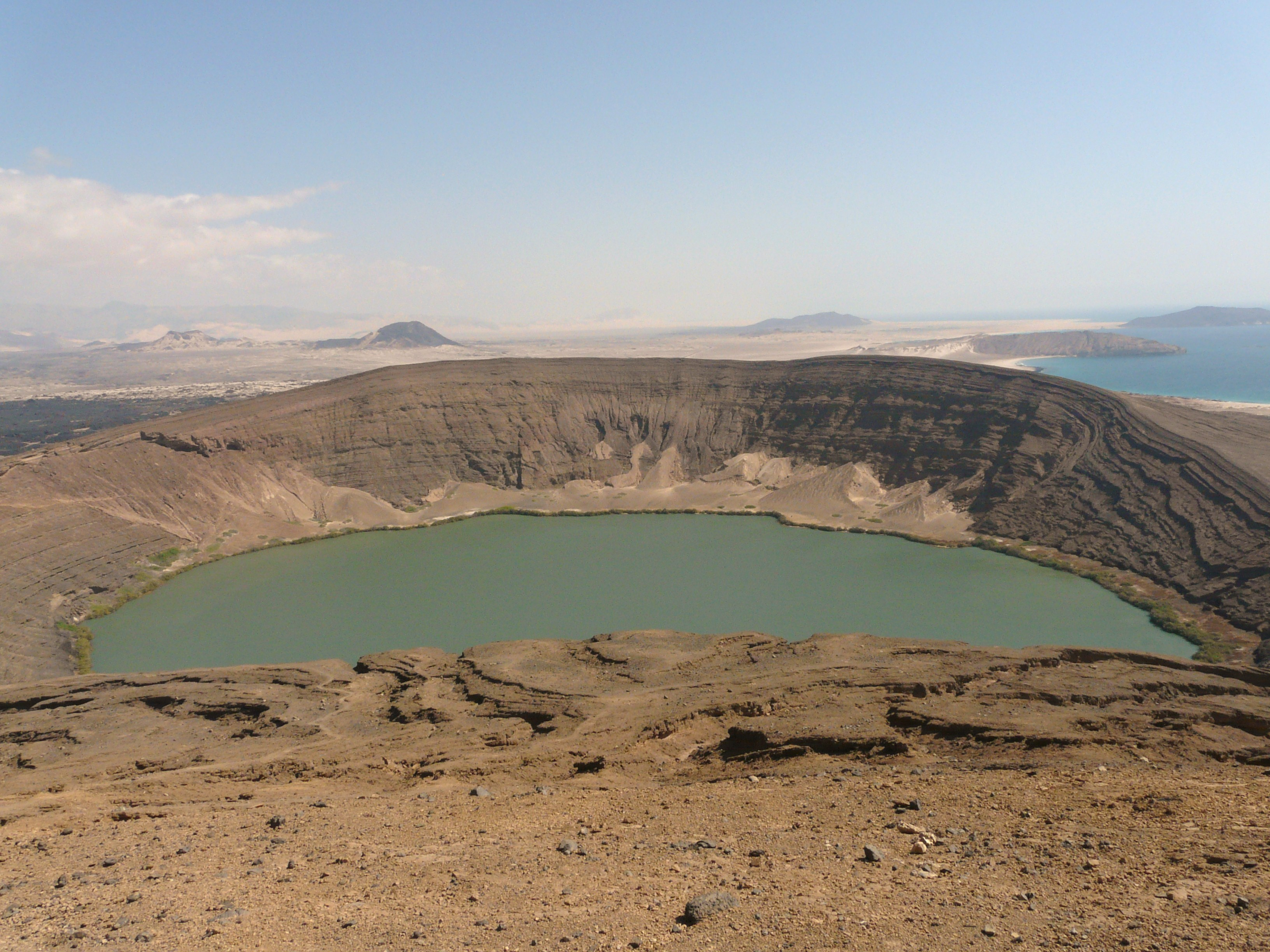
Bir Ali crater in Balhaf.

Balhaf (Arabic: بالحاف) is a city on the coast of Yemen.

== Location ==
Balhaf belongs to Shabwa of Yemen, located about 150 km from Mukalla-the capital of Hadhramaut (48.1802°E 13.9854°N).

== History ==
Balhaf was the capital of the Sultanate of Wahidi Balhaf, one of several Wahini states which in the 1880s became part of the British Aden Protectorate. In 1902 the fort at Balhaf was demolished by troops from the British cruiser HMS Perseus, in response to pirate activities by the locals.

== World Heritage status ==
This site was added to the UNESCO World Heritage Tentative List on 08/07/2002, in the mixed (cultural and natural) category.

== Importance ==
Balhaf is now considered one of the main ports of Yemen, particularly after the success of Yemen LNG project for constructing a liquefied natural gas plant in 2006.
