= Wahidi Azzan =

Wahidi sultanate in the Aden Protectorate (1830–1881)

Wahidi Azzan, officially the Wahidi Sultanate of Azzan, was one of four Wahidi sultanates in the area that eventually became the Aden Protectorate. It was established in 1830 and existed until May 4, 1881, when it became a part of Wahidi Balhaf.
