= Bir Ali =

Coordinates: 14°01′30″N 48°20′31″E

Bi'r `Ali
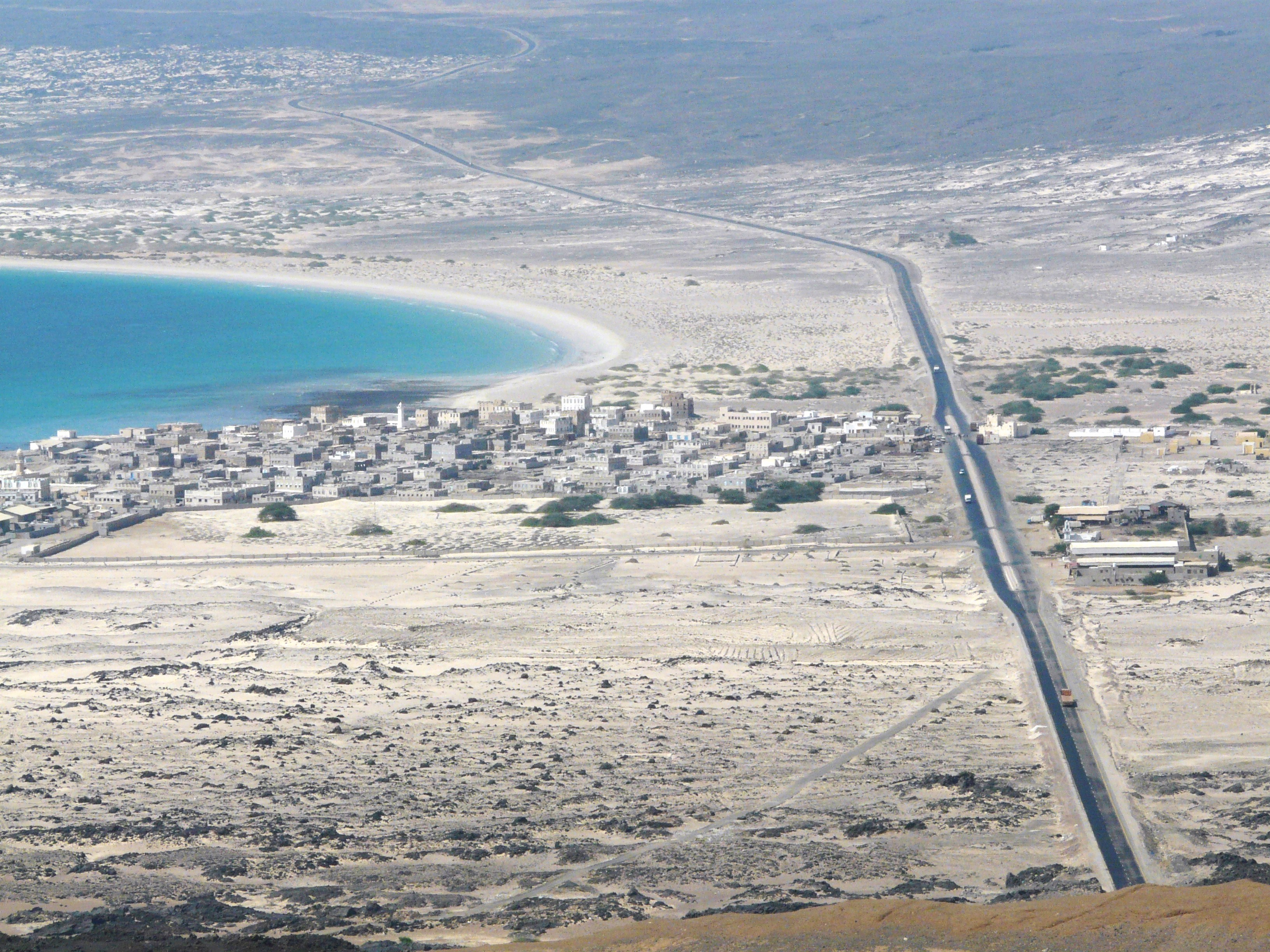
- Interactive map of Bi'r `Ali
- Country: Yemen
- Governorate: Shabwah
- Time zone: UTC+3 (Yemen Standard Time)

Biʾr ʿAlī is a village in eastern Yemen. It is located in the Shabwah Governorate. The name means "Ali's Well" in Arabic. In pre-Islamic times, the port was called Qanīʾ (Qane, Cana, Ancient Greek: Κάνη).

== Ancient history ==
=== Literature ===
In antiquity, Qanīʾ was mainly a trading port for spices from India and Eastern coast of Africa. Describing the part of his voyage after leaving the Red Sea and Aden, the author of the Periplus of the Erythraean Sea wrote in 50 CE:

After Eudaemon, Arabia (present day Aden) there is a continuous length of coast, and by extending 2000 stadia or more, along which there are nomads and Fish Eaters living in villages; just beyond the cape projecting from this bay there is another market town by the shore, Cana, of the Kingdom of Eliazus, the frankincense country; and facing it there are two desert islands, one called Island of Birds, the other Dome Island, one hundred and twenty stadia from Cana. Inland from this place lies the Metropolis Sabbatha, in which the King lives. All the frankincense produced in the country is brought by camels to that place to be stored, and to Cana on rafts held up by inflated skins after the manner of the country, and in boats. And this place has a trade also with the far side ports, with Barygaza and Scythia and Ommana and with the neighbouring coast of Persia. There are imported into this place from, Egypt, a little wheat and wine, as at Muza (near present day: Mokha); clothing in the Arabian style, plain and common and most of it spurious; and copper and tin and coral and storax and other things such as go to Muza; and for the King usually wrought gold and silver plate, also horses, images, and thin clothing of fine quality. And there are exported from this place, native produce, frankincense and aloes, and the rest of the things that enter into the trade of the other ports. The voyage to this place is best made at the same time as that to Muza, or rather earlier.

=== Archaeological finds ===
Wine jars (amphorae) dating back to the 1st century CE were discovered in Biʾr ʿAlī in 1988, in an underwater excavation along the shores of the Indian Ocean. On one of the jars is inscribed a word in the Palmyrene (Tadmori) alphabet and a word in Syriac script. The conclusion drawn by researchers, B. Davidde and R. Petriaggi, is that from the mid-1st century CE wine was imported from Italy and Syria upon camels that disembarked from Coptos (Qift) which lies along the banks of the Nile River in Egypt, thence unto ports Myos Hormos – a place that later became known as al-Quṣayr – and Berenike situated on the western shore of the Red Sea, and from there transported by ship to trade centers in Arabia, Ethiopia and India.

The alleged ruins of a Jewish synagogue were also discovered in Biʾr ʿAlī, dating back to at least the 3rd century CE. It is presumed that Jewish merchants from Hellenistic communities outside of Yemen may have eventually chosen to settle in that place, where they would have been occupied in the trade of aromatics. This assumption is based on the five-lined Greek inscription that was preserved in the synagogue of ancient Qanīʻ (Biʾr ʿAlī), the content of which being a petition by a man named Kosmās unto the One God (eis theos) that he will protect his caravan (synodia) while traversing the vast wastelands.

However, the identification of the site has been strongly questioned by some scholars: "The mirage of Qanīʾ’s Jews serves as a cautionary tale. ... What we don’t know is this: almost anything about the function of the buildings excavated in Sector Three at Qanīʾ"

== See also ==
- Wahidi Sultanate of Biʾr ʿAlī

== Bibliography ==
- A. V. Sedov, New archaeological and epigraphic material from Qana, South Arabia. Arabian Archaeology and Epigraphy, (1992) pp. 110–137
  - ibid., Qana’ (Yemen) and the Indian Ocean: The archaeological evidence. In: H. P. Raye & J.-F. Salles (eds), Tradition and archaeology: Early Maritime Contacts in the Indian Ocean. Proceedings of the International Seminar Techno-archaeological Perspectives of Seafaring in the Indian Ocean 4th cent. BC–15th cent. AD, New Delhi, Feb. 28–March 4, 1994, Lyon-New Delhi (1996), pp. 11–35
- Jean-François Breton, Arabia Felix from the Time of the Queen of Sheba: Eighth Century B.C. to First Century A.D. Translated from the French by Albert LaFarge. Notre Dame, Indiana (1999)
- Françoise Briquel-Chatonnet, Les graffiti en langues nord-sémitique de Bīr ‘Alī (Qāni’). In: J.F. Salles & A. Sedov (eds.), Qāni’: Le poet antique de Hadramawt entre la Méditerannée, l'Afrique et L'Inde, Fouilles Russes 1972, 1985-89, 1991, 1993-94, Lyon 201 (2010), pp. 387
- Joseph Patrich, Bet kǝneset yǝhudi qadum bǝ‘ir ha-namel qani she-bǝ-teman. Qadmoniyyot 142 (2011), pp. 102–106 (Hebrew)
- Barbara Davidde & Roberto Petriaggi, Considerations on commercial trades of Laodiceum and Amineum wines through the underwater archaeological findings in the port of Qani’. In: S. Antonini, A. Shu‘lân & Munir Arbach (eds), Sabaean Studies: Archaeological, Epigraphical and Historical Studies in Honour of Yusuf Abdallah, Alessandro de Maigret, Christian Robin on the occasion of their 60th birthday (2005), pp. 85–95. Naples-Ṣan‘ā’
- Mark Letteney and Simcha Gross, "Reconsidering the Earliest Synagogue in Yemen." Studies in Late Antiquity 6(4). https://doi.org/10.1525/sla.2022.6.4.627
