= Anglo-Yemeni War =

1919-34 conflict in South Arabia

- Part of the Interwar period
Date	January 1919 – 11 February 1934
Location	South Arabia
Territorial changes	Yemen annexes Baidah, Na'wah, Rubeaten, and Juban; Britain retains control over the Aden Protectorate

Belligerents
Kingdom of Yemen; Dhala (until November 1919)	British Empire; Aden Protectorate; Dhala (from November 1919); Other British clients; Baidah; Na'wah; Rubeaten; Juban

Commanders and leaders
(Kingdom of Yemen) Imam Yahya; (Emirate of Dhala) Amir Nasir	(British Empire) Various; See List of British colonial administrators of Aden; Allied tribal leaders

The Anglo-Yemeni War was a conflict fought in South Arabia from 1919 to 1934.

In 1918, the Ottoman Empire signed the Armistice of Mudros, concluding the Middle Eastern theatre of World War I. Shortly after, Imam Yahya, who had previously been an Ottoman vassal, established the Kingdom of Yemen as an independent state. Yahya pursued a revanchist foreign policy, seeking to conquer the Aden Protectorate; the territory had been lost by the imams of Yemen by the early 18th century. Furthermore, Yahya incorrectly believed that the British Empire sought to conquer north Yemen.

The immediate trigger for conflict centred on the Emirate of Dhala. Shortly after the outbreak of the South Arabian campaign in World War I, its Emir - Nasir ibn Sha'if al-`Amiri - had submitted to the Ottomans. By January 1919, after the Ottoman surrender, Nasir aligned himself with the Kingdom of Yemen. However, by November 1919, Nasir's allegiance had shifted back to Britain. That month, Nasir departed from Dhala to Aden to negotiate with the British, but during his departure, Yemen occupied his domain.

From November 1919 to March 1920, Yemen invaded the Aden Protectorate in force; the southward offensive captured Shaib, Rubeaten, Al-Dhubi, Maflahi, Alawi, and parts of Haushabi. Over the course of 1920, Yemen's offensive was siphoned by a separate war being fought against the Emirate of Asir (towards Yemen's west), and fear of British aerial power. In 1923, Yemen managed to capture the capital of the Baidah Sultanate. In 1928, a British offensive managed to recapture Dhala, though the Yemeni occupation persisted in other parts of the Aden Protectorate.

In the 1930s, both sides became increasingly amenable to a peace treaty. This stemmed from numerous factors: on Britain's side, these included economic and political concerns, whereas Imam Yahya became increasingly desirous of a peace deal due to looming war with Saudi Arabia. Thus, on 11 February 1934, the treaty of Saana was signed. Though Yemen was forced to evacuate 64 Audhali and 8 Dali villages, the settlement otherwise confirmed much of the existing frontier. Furthermore, Britain recognized Yemen's independence.

== Background ==
On 30 October 1918, the Ottoman Empire signed the Armistice of Mudros, concluding the Middle Eastern theatre of World War I. Shortly after, Imam Yahya, who had previously been an Ottoman vassal, established the Kingdom of Yemen as an independent state. The frontier of the emerging kingdom inadvertently came to border Britain's Aden Protectorate. In arguing that the protectorate belonged to him, the imam invoked historical claims to the region. However, within the protectorate, opponents of Yemeni expansion argued that the Imams of Yemen had lost the region due to rebellion rather than withdrawal, and that they had not ruled the region since the early 18th century. In 1931, Ahmad Fadl al 'Abdali recounted these rebellions in Haddiyat al Zaman fi akhbar al Muluk Lahej wa ' Aden (the story of the Kings of Lahej and Aden); the text was regarded as a rebuke to the Imam's argument, though it also criticised Britain. That said, tribal opinion within the protectorate was not homogenous, and whereas some tribes opposed the Imam, others accepted his rule. Furthermore, some tribes shifted in their allegiance over the course of the conflict.

Imam Yahya further believed that the British Empire intended to conquer North Yemen. This impression was reinforced by the British occupation of Hodeida in 1919, British maltreatment of Yemeni envoys, and the continuation of Britain's wartime blockade until August 1919. In reality, Britain had no such territorial ambitions.

The immediate trigger for conflict centred on the Emirate of Dhala. Shortly after the outbreak of the South Arabian campaign in World War I, its Emir - Nasir ibn Sha'if al-`Amiri - had submitted to the Ottomans. By January 1919, after the Ottoman surrender, Nasir aligned himself with the Kingdom of Yemen. However, by November 1919, Nasir's allegiance had shifted back to Britain. That month, Nasir departed from Dhala to Aden to negotiate with the British, but during his departure, Yemen occupied his domain. On 19 January 1920, the Emir recaptured Dhala, but on the 21st, Yemen recaptured it. It took until 1928 for Dhala to be definitely recaptured; the broader conflict continued until 1934.

== Timeline ==
- January 1919: Imam Yahya holds a meeting of Yemeni sheikhs, alleging that Britain aims to rule all of Yemen.
- January 1919: Yemeni troops give assistance to Amir Nasir ibn Sha'if al-`Amiri in Dhala.
- 31 March 1919: By this time, Yemen is collecting taxes in Juban and Nawa.
- August 1919: British Colonel Jacob attempts to negotiate a detente in Sanaa, but fails.
- October 1919: Yemeni troops occupy Taiz and Mawiyah.
- November 1919: Amir Nasir of Dhala arrives in Aden to pledge allegiance to Britain, but during his leave, Yemeni troops occupy Dhala directly.
- November 1919: the Yemenis capture 3 sections of Upper Yafa: Shaib, Rubeaten and Al-Dhubi.
- 31 December 1919: By this time, Yemen had advanced into Maflahi and Haushabi territory.
- January 1920: Aden dispatches arms and ammunition to its clients to assist their defense.
- 2 January 1920: By this time, Yemen has captured Shaib.
- 19 January 1920: Nasir recaptures Dhala from Yemen.
- 21 January 1920: Yemen recaptures Dhala from Nasir.
- 28 January 1920: By this time, Yemen has captured Tafwa, on the border of the Alawi Sheikhdom.
- 10 March 1920: By this time, the Alawi Sheikhdom has surrendered to Yemen.
- 7 April 1920: It is reported that Yemen has deprioritised the invasion of the Aden Protectorate in order to fight the Emirate of Asir to its west.
- 14 October 1920: It is reported that Yemen forces are continuing to halt their advance, in part due to concerns regarding British air power.
- 29 January 1921: Britain evacuates Hodeida.
- September 1921: Yemenis occupy the Subeihi territory in the Sultanate of Lahej.
- 30 November 1921: it was reported that a Yemeni force had attacked the Baidah Sultanate, and advanced into its territory. T. Scott, the political resident at Aden, noted that "the cause of this advance is not known".
- 31 December 1921: by this time, Yemeni forces have pushed deeper into Baidahni territory and captured Sawadiyah; Britain responded by sending Baidah arms and ammunition. Baidah received further reinforcements from the Yafais (divided between Upper and Lower Yafa).
- 1922: Italy starts supplying the Imam with arms.
- January 1922: Yemeni troops enroach on Haushabi territory as far as Ad Dareija and only withdrew under pressure of air action.
- February 1922: RAF bombs Yemeni troops occupying Haushabi and Subeihi territories, stemming the Yemeni advance.
- March 1922: With Aden having defended the British protectorate successfully through bombardment, colonial officials start to disregard the need for a peace treaty.
- 1923: Yemeni troops invade and occupy the highland portion of Audhali territory known as Adh Dhahir.
- June 1923: Yemen advances on the Beda Sultanate.
- July 1923: Britain issues 10,000 rounds of ammunition to Beihan.
- September 1923: Yemenis invaded the Beda sultanate in force.
- 30 November 1923: by this time, Yemen, bolstered by Humekani rebels, has captured Baidah's capital.
- 1924: The British abandon the Beda sultanate to the Yemenis.
- April 1924: Start of the Idrisid–Mutawakillite war
- 1925: in consequence of the Yemenis encroaching still further and occupying the lowland portion of the Audhali, known as Al Kor, and the commercial town of Lodar together with the adjoining village of Al Kubeida where the Sultan resided, British air action was taken against them with tribal co-operation and they were compelled to withdraw from the lowland portio of the Audhali sultanate.
- 18 March 1925: it is reported that Yemen has started hostilities with Ansir and captured Ibn Abbas, a village near Kamaran. By this time, Yemen has occupied Salif and Loheia, and advanced 15 miles north of the latter city. Hodeida remains under Asiri control.
- April 1925: By this time, British assistance to Beihan tallies to 126 rifles and 226,000 rounds.
- 23 April 1925: 700 boxes of ammunition reportedly arrive in Hodeida from the French government.
- 8 May 1925: Yemeni troops defeat Asir in a battle north of Loheia.
- c. June 1925: In the context of the Saudi conquest of Hejaz, the Kingdom of Yemen signs a treaty with the Kingdom of Hejaz pledging mutual military assistance and non-aggression.
- July & October 1925: In two battles, the Audhali sultanate stems the Yemeni eastward advance with British air support, though it loses tribal lands on top of the Khor al Awdhilla.
- late 1925: the Zaraniq rebellion (1925–1929) breaks out in Yemeni territory.
- January 1926: British envoy Gilbert Clayton meets the Imam in Saana for negotiations; peace talks ultimately fail as the imam refuses to withdraw from Dale and recognize treaties between Britain and its existing protectorate clients.
- 24 February 1926: Yemeni-Idrisi conflict: the Yemenis control Hodeidah, Loheia, and Slaeef, while the Idrisi still control Midi, Sabya and Jizan.
- 8 December 1926: A British memo from the colonial office to the cabinet states that, while the British retention of Aden remains a point of consensus for colonial officials, there is controversy on whether the entirety of the Aden Protectorate remains worth defending against the Imam.
  - The same memo states that the recent removal of the arms embargo to Arabia has strengthened the Emirate of Asir.
- 12 April 1927: By this time, Yemeni troops are concentrated at Medi, Harad, Hajur and Sada.
- 11 August 1927: Clashes on the Saudi-Yemeni Border are reported.
- c. 31 August 1927: Imam Yahya alleges that Ibn Saud plans to occupy the Emirate of Asir.
- 21-23 February 1928: the RAF bombs Yemeni positions in Dali.
- 1 June 1928: The HMS Dahlia embarks at Al Ghulayfiqah, departing the next day. During its stay, a brother of Sheikh Fratini of Taif asks Britain to support anti-Imam rebels; in return for ammo, half of all loot would be divided between the rebels and Britain. Britain declines.
- 8 June 1928: By this time, civilians in Hodeida are allegedly worried about a possible attack by the Zaraniq on their city, who "some little time back" had carried out two successful raids just north of the city.
- 21 & 24 June 1928: Britain issues its final warnings to the Imam to evacuate Dala.
- 25 June 1928: Due to the Imam continuing to occupy Dala despite warnings, Britain starts bombing Yemeni tribesmen.
- 27 June 1928: By this time, the Imam has reached a truce with the Zaraniq, described by a British agent as "purely a temporary measure to suit their purse"; the Zaraniq declare that they will attack the Imam if Britain or Italy aids them with ammunition.
- 4 July 1928: By this time, British bombings on Yemeni tribesmen are continuing daily, "with satisfactory results".
- 12 July 1928: British bombing of As Suleik, near Dala.
- 14-15 July 1928: Britain captures Dali in a combined air-land assault.
- July 1928: the Yemenis evacuate Shaib, but still control Rubeaten, Nawa and Al-Dhubi.
- August 1928: two Yemeni counterattacks on Dali are repelled; all Yemeni-occupied territory outside the Audhali sultanate is recaptured
- September 1928: Imam Yahya indicates his willingness to re-open negotiations with Britain.
- c. 5 November 1928: (Note: "about a week ago", relative to 12 November) Ahmed Fitini, sheikh of the Zaraniq, leaves Kamaran from Jizan with 70 tribesmen.
- January 1929: Britain suppresses a Subeihi uprising.
- June 1930: the troops of the Imam of Sanaa who had advanced to the Harib district, north-west of Beihan, with headquarters at Al Joba and Darb al Ali, begin to encroach on Al Ain, which is inhabited by Masabi tribesmen.
- 1933: Tensions rise between the Imam and Ibn Saud, making the Imam more amenable to a treaty with the British.
- June 1933: The Imam makes a peace offering to the British.
- 11 February 1934: the final peace treaty is signed; the Imam evacuates 64 Audhali and 8 Dali villages.

== Conclusion ==
After 1930, Britain became increasingly amenable to a peace treaty with Yemen. This stemmed from numerous factors: first of all, as the Audhali grew to constitute a greater portion of Britain's tribal levies, it became increasingly important to secure their allegiance by persuading Yemen to end the occupation of their country. Second of all, by 1933, British officials had become increasingly vocal about the economic benefits of re-opening trade with Yemen. Third of all, as tribal unrest increased, a treaty was increasingly regarded as a means to redirect Britain's focus on more pressing matters. Meanwhile, over the course of 1933, Saudi-Yemeni relations increasingly deteriorated due to border disputes, and as war loomed, Imam Yahya became increasingly desirous of a peace deal to redirect his attention northward. Thus, on 11 February 1934, the treaty of Saana was signed between Yahya Muhammad Hamid ed-Din, representing Yemen, and Bernard Rawdon Reilly, representing Britain. Though Yemen was forced to evacuatee 64 Audhali and 8 Dali villages, the settlement otherwise confirmed much of the existing frontier. Furthermore, Britain recognized Yemen's independence.
