= Rubeaten =

Sheikhdom and dependency of Upper Yafa

Rubeaten was a sheikhdom and dependency of Upper Yafa

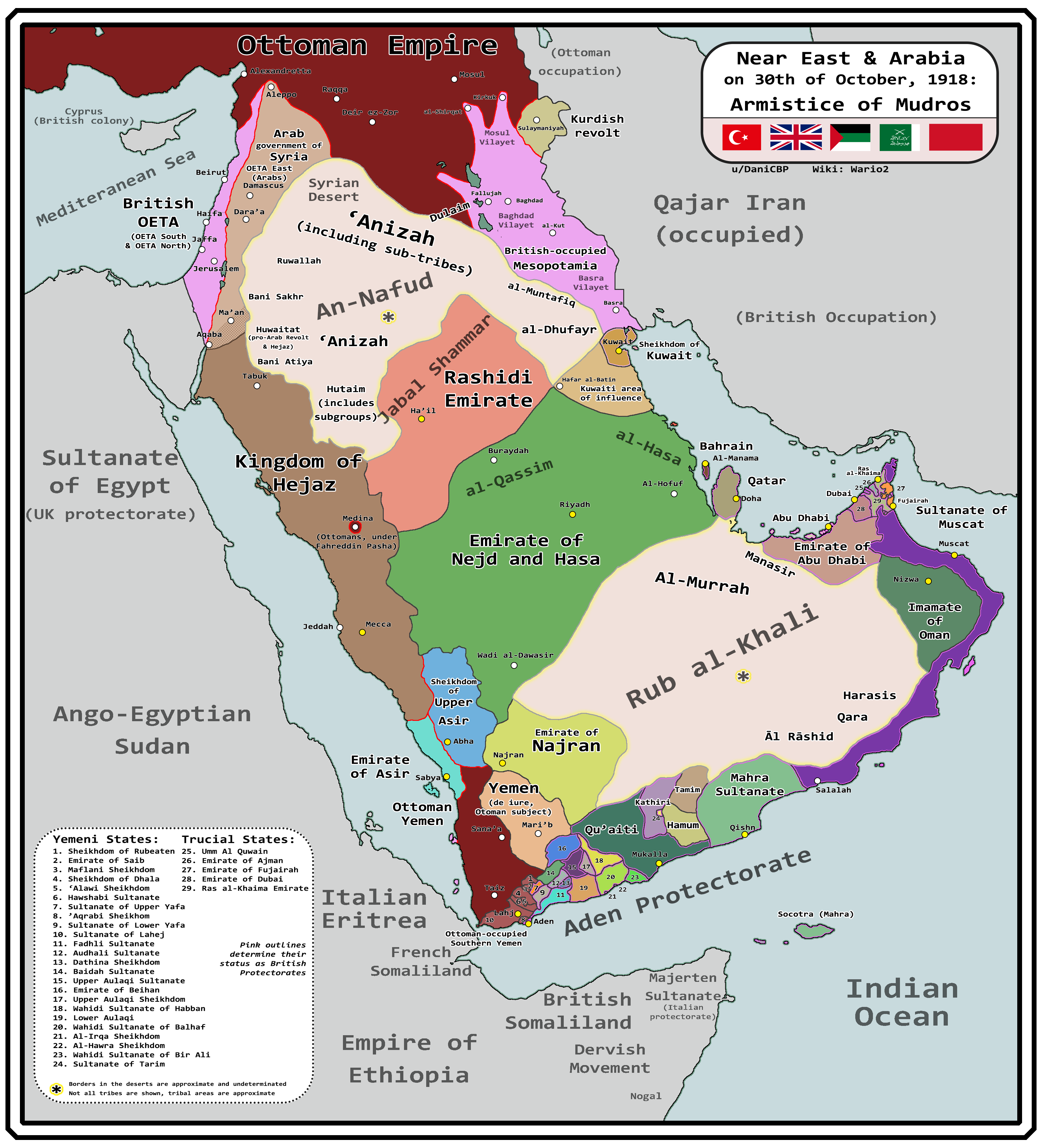
Rubeaten sheikhdom in 1918 after Armistice of Mudros ( As number 1)

== Timeline ==
- Early 18th century: Rubeaten becomes a dependency of Upper Yafa.
- 1873: The Ottoman Empire sends troops into Rubeaten and forces the polity to pay a yearly tribute.
- July 1901: Rubeaten breaks free from being an Ottoman tributary.
- February 1915: During World War I, Rubeaten submits to an Ottoman invasion and raises their flag.
- November 1919: Following the end of World War I, Rubeaten is occupied and annexed by the Mutawakkilite Kingdom of Yemen.

== Geography ==
Rubeatean was bordered by Juban and Na'wah on the north, and Shaib on the south.

It was divided into 4 districts which spanned a total of 15 villages.

== Government ==
As of 1905, Rubeaten was ruled by 3 sheikhs:

- Yahia bin Askar bin Abdulla
- Saleh bin Ahmad Ali
- Yahia Nasir Omar Shibren

== Demographics ==
As of 1905, Rubeaten had a population of 2000.

== Military ==
As of 1905, Rubeaten had 400 fighting men.
