= Baidah Sultanate =

Sultanate in modern-day Yemen

Baidah Sultanate سلطنة البيضاء
- 1636–1930
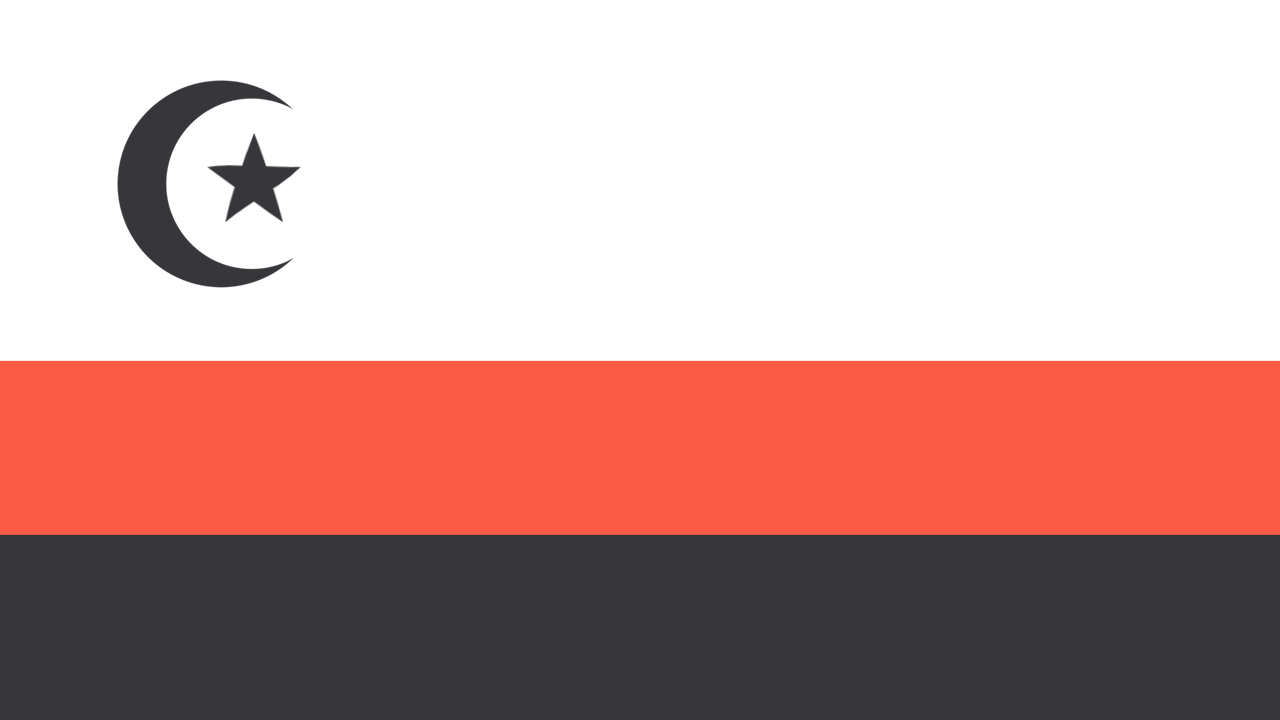
- Flag (used until 1921)

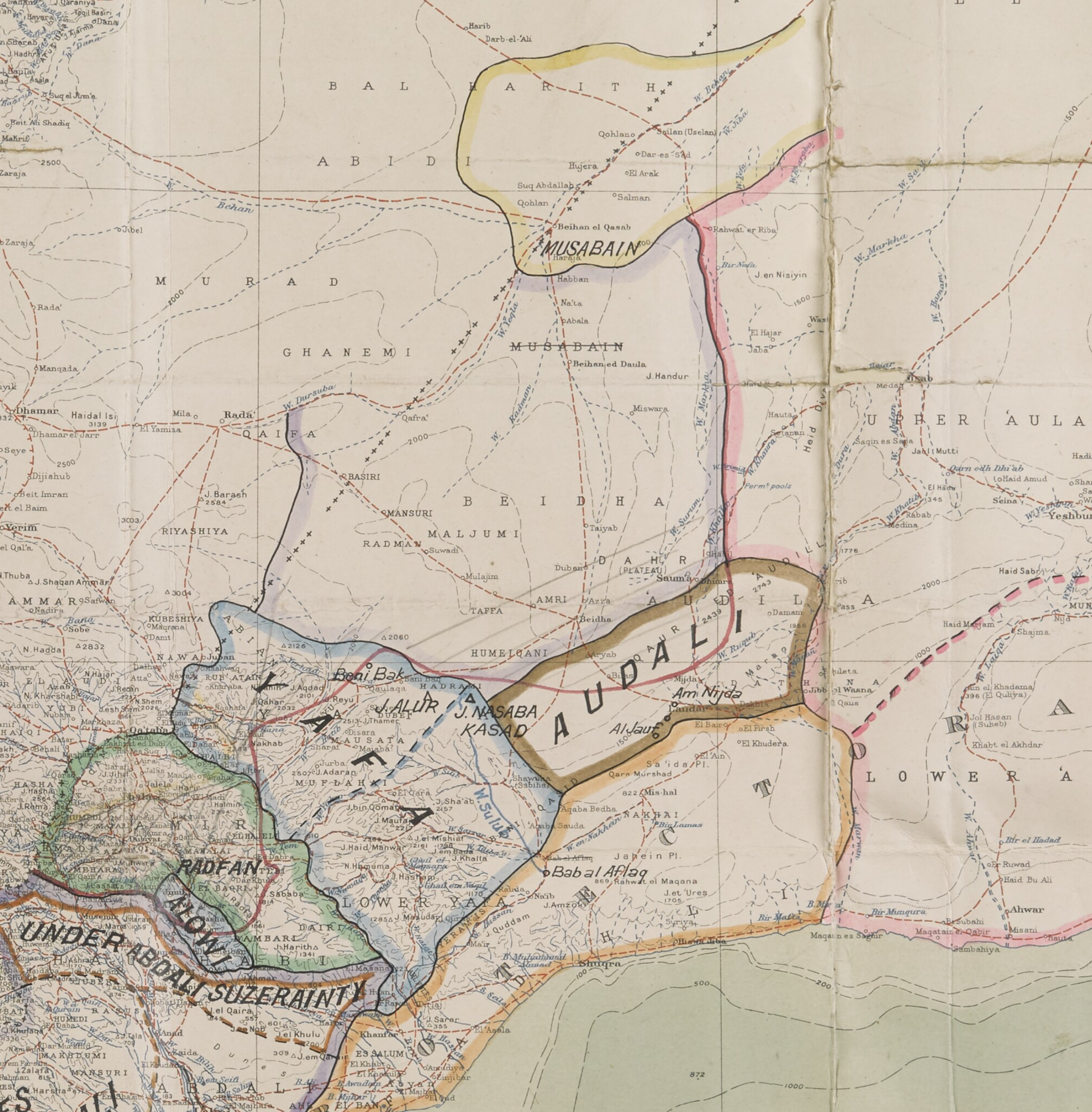
- The Baidah Sultanate (centre, lavender blue) in 1926
- Capital: Baidah
- Common languages: Arabic
- Demonym: Baidhani
- Government: Confederal monarchy
- Sultan
  - bef. 1909 - c. 1915: Ali Bin Abdallah
  - as of 1916: Abdallah bin Alawi bin Husein
- History
  - Established: 1636
  - Conquered by the Kingdom of Yemen: 1930
| Preceded by | Succeeded by |
| Ottoman Empire | Kingdom of Yemen |
- Today part of: Yemen

The Baidah Sultanate (Arabic: سلطنة البيضاء), also known as the Sultanate of Al Rasas (Arabic: سلطنة ال رصاص), was a state in South Arabia.

Founded in the 17th century, the Baidah Sultanate was at one point a very powerful factor in the region, but by the early 20th century, its influence had waned. From 1905 to 1912, the Baidah Sultan attempted to obtain a protectorate treaty with Britain, but the negotiations proved fruitless. Supplied by Britain, the sultanate repelled multiple Ottoman invasions during World War I. In 1921, the sultanate was invaded by the Kingdom of Yemen. Yemen conquered its capital in 1923, and fully subsumed it by 1930.

== History ==
With the Ottoman withdrawal from Yemen in 1636 AD, Yemen became independent, but the southern provinces, which were known in the past as the East, separated from Yemen after the Turkish withdrawal and became fragmented into sultanates and provinces such as Yafa', Al-Fadhli, Al-Rasas, Al-Wahdi, Al-Awlaki, Lahj, Al-Haythami, Al-Kathiri. In Al-Bayda (Saraw Madhaj), a number of the Saraw Mazhaj tribes around Hesi unanimously asserted their independence.

The Baidah Sultans were at one point a very powerful factor in the region, but in their later years their influence waned.

From 1905 to 1912, the Baidah Sultan attempted to obtain a protectorate treaty with Britain, but the negotiations proved fruitless. In September 1914, it was reported that the Baidah Sultan refused to enter into a treaty unless Britain would promise to pay a stipend, give 100 rifles with ammunition, 2 cannons, and gunpowder.

=== World War I ===
On 2 February 1915, during World War I, the Ottoman Empire invaded the Baidah Sultanate. The Haushabi sent a large force in support of the Baidah Sultan. By the 13th, the Baidah had routed the Ottomans and captured their tents and ammunition. Sometime before the 20th, the Ottomans returned and raided Baidah's outlying villages, before being chased away by a Baidahni force of 1,000 troops, suffering 10 killed and many wounded, as well as losing 3 camels filled with ammunition, shells and tents. The Baidah Sultan expected that the Ottomans would invade again and declared to Britain his intention to defend his country to the last. On his request, Britain sent him ammunition.

On 21 March 1916, Zaidi forces loyal to the Ottoman Empire launched another offensive into the Baidah Sultanate, intending to use Baidah as a springboard for further offensives onto Shihr and Mukalla. Recognizing the threat posed, Britain sent 200 rifles and 30,000 rounds of ammunition to the Baidah Sultan in support. The attack ultimately failed.

=== Interwar period and conquest by Yemen ===
After the end of World War I, the newly formed Kingdom of Yemen sought to conquer Britain's Aden Protectorate. It was in this context that, in November 1920, it was reported that Lower Yafa had made a pact with the Baidah Sultanate to drive Yemen out of Dhale - the occupied capital of the Emirate of Dhala.

In November 1921, it was reported that a Yemeni force had attacked the Baidah Sultanate, and advanced into its territory. T. Scott, the political resident at Aden, noted that "the cause of this advance is not known". In the following month, as Yemeni forces pushed deeper and captured Sawadiyah, Britain responded by sending Baidah arms and ammunition. Baidah received further reinforcements from the Yafais (divided between Upper and Lower Yafa). In January 1922, as Yemeni forces moved further east, they attacked Baidahn tribesmen at Afar and Zahra, but were repelled and suffered 60 combat deaths. Yemeni forces evacuated Sawadiyah in February, but re-occupied it in March 1922.

Sometime between 7 March and 10 April 1923, the Humekani tribe launched an uprising against the Baidah Sultan. In September 1923, as the revolt continued, Yemen renewed its offensive on Baidah "in strength". Around October, (Note: Between 30 September and 6 November 1923.) Yemen captured Ahl Umar. In November, the invading Yemenis, bolstered by Humekani rebels, captured Baidah's capital. Though a significant back-and-forth continued in the Baidah area throughout 1924, it was in this year that Britain ceased its support for the Sultanate and effectively abandoned the area to Yemen. A British map of the Aden Protectorate, created in January 1926, shows virtually all of the sultanate as having been conquered, safe for an approximately 30 km^{2} triangular area at its southernmost fringe.

In 1930, Yemen completed its conquest of the Baidah sultanate. On 11 February 1934, Yemen and Britain signed a peace treaty, which solidified their existing frontier and confirmed many of Yemen's territorial gains since the end of World War I.

== Sultans ==
- Ali Bin Abdallah reigned from before 1909 to c. 1915. He unsuccessfully attempted to obtain a protection treaty with Britain. He remained Sultan as of 1915.
- Abdallah bin Alawi bin Husein was the sultan as of 1916. A British report dated 28 January 1916 said he had been newly elected and described him as a "stout warrior".
- Hussain Al-Rassas

== Geography ==
Baidah bordered the Audhali to the south, Beihan to the north, Upper Yafa to the west, and the Aulaqi to the southeast.

The terrain of Baidah was an elevated plateau sloping gradually to the low-lying Beihan to the north. The soil was sandy and fertile.

== Tribes ==
The Baidah Sultanate was a confederacy of 10 tribes, of which the Humekani and Azzani were the most influential.

- Azzani
- Homaikani
- Dubani
- Madafai
- Mash'ari
- Al-'Umar
- Hashami
- Dafari
- Hayashi
- Maljami
