= South Arabia during World War I =

Campaign in South Arabia
- Part of Middle Eastern theatre of World War I
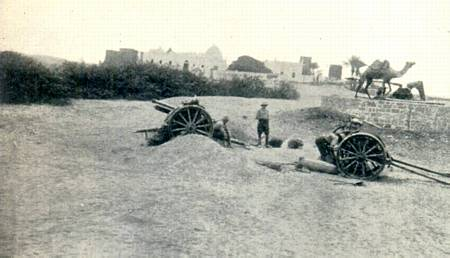
- A QF 15 pounder emplacement of B Battery, Honourable Artillery Company at Sheik Othman in 1915
Date	10 November 1914 – 31 March 1919
Location	South Arabia (modern-day Yemen)
Territorial changes	End of the Yemen vilayet; Establishment and independence of the Mutawakkilite Kingdom of Yemen in the north; British control over the Aden Protectorate is solidified; Temporary expansion of the Idrisid Emirate of Asir into the Tihamah region

Belligerents
Ottoman Empire: Imams of Yemen (Note: See Treaty of Daan); Haushabi Sultanate; Ahl Haydara Mansur tribe; Kathiri sultanate (1917–1918); Kingdom of Yemen (from 1918)	(United Kingdom) British Empire: India; New Zealand; Aden Protectorate; Lahej; Fadhli Sultanate; Baidah Sultanate; Emirate of Asir

Commanders and leaders
(Ottoman Empire) Ahmet Tevfik Pasha; (Ottoman Empire) Omer Fakhri Pasha; (Ottoman Empire) Ali Sait Pasha; (Ottoman Empire) Hüseyin Ragıp Bey; al-Mansur b. Ghalib al-Kathiri; (Kingdom of Yemen) Imam Yahya	(United Kingdom of Great Britain and Ireland) H. V. Cox; (United Kingdom of Great Britain and Ireland) D. G. L. Shaw; (United Kingdom of Great Britain and Ireland) G. J. Younghusband; Fadhl ibn Ali al Abdali †; Muhammad ibn Ali al-Idrisi

Strength
14,000 Ottoman regulars Yemeni irregulars	(United Kingdom of Great Britain and Ireland) 34,500 (total)

Casualties and losses
500–1,000 casualties	(United Kingdom of Great Britain and Ireland) 1,263+ 647 killed or missing 32 captured 584+ wounded

The campaign in South Arabia during World War I was a minor military campaign for control of the port city of Aden, an important way station for ships on their way from Asia to the Suez Canal. The British Empire declared war on the Ottoman Empire on 5 November 1914, and the Ottomans responded with their own declaration on 11 November. From the beginning, the Ottomans had planned an invasion of Britain's Aden Protectorate in cooperation with the local Arab tribes. The Ottomans had gathered in some strength on the Cheikh Saïd, a peninsula which juts out into the Red Sea towards the island of Perim.

At the start of the war, the British had one force stationed in the Aden Protectorate, the Aden Brigade, which was part of the British Indian Army. In November 1914, an Ottoman force from Yemen attacked Aden but was driven off by the Brigade. The last Ottoman troops surrendered in March 1919.

== Background ==
=== Opening of the Front ===
The Ottoman Empire had been engaged in a diplomatic and territorial rivalry in Yemen with Great Britain -which had occupied Aden in 1839- until 1914. This competition occasionally resulted in localized armed skirmishes. In March 1914, following a period of diplomatic negotiations, the two powers signed a boundary agreement. This treaty partitioned the Yemeni territories into Ottoman and British spheres of influence, a division that would largely define the region's political geography until the late 20th century.

At the outbreak of World War I in August 1914, the Ottoman Empire and the British Aden Protectorate shared a direct land border. Given the strategic importance of the region, both administrations monitored the border closely. While the Ottoman Empire initially maintained a neutral stance, its subsequent entry into the war on the side of the Central Powers made a conflict in Yemen increasingly probable.

Mahmut Nedim Bey, the last Ottoman Governor of Yemen, noted that the decision to initiate hostilities was made in consultation with Ali Sait Bey, commander of the VII Corps. Regarding the mobilization and the breach of the 1914 border agreement, Mahmut Nedim stated:

Together with Ali Sait Pasha, we ascended Mount Jihaf, which commands the entire region. We then descended to Dhala, where we removed the local sheikh and appointed his brother, Abdulhamit, in his place. Finally, we reached the border and removed the frontier markers.

— Mahmut Nedim (Akdilek) Bey, Governor of Yemen - 1914

Ottoman archival records suggest that tensions escalated following British maritime activity along the Yemeni coast. British authorities in the Aden Protectorate, concerned by Ottoman military movements in the vicinity of Al-Hudaydah, had discussed the possibility of naval strikes as early as August 1914, contingent upon "hostile Ottoman intent." Following the Black Sea raid and the formal commencement of hostilities between the Ottoman Empire and the Entente, a British gunboat arrived off Hodeidah in early November 1914 and sank two Ottoman vessels. (Note: Although this raid by Great Britain is given as October 1914 in various sources, the raid actually took place on 4 November 1914.)

The raid on Hudaydah served as a catalyst for the total breakdown of diplomatic relations in the region. Ottoman authorities protested the action and placed pressure on the British consulate, while the British Consul formally announced the cessation of relations with the Yemen Vilayet. Consequently, the VII Corps was placed on full alert, and military operations were initiated throughout the Yemen Front.

=== Command and forces on the front and Center of gravity ===
==== British forces ====
British forces defending the Aden Protectorate were initially centered around the Aden Brigade, commanded successively by D. G. L. Shaw and George J. Younghusband, and later reinforced by the 29th Indian Brigade under H. V. Cox.

==== Ottoman Forces ====
The VII Corps was stationed in Sanaa, the center of the Yemen vilayet. When World War I broke out, it was directly attached to the Ministry of War along with its two divisions (the 39th and 40th Divisions). Therefore, when a front opened in Yemen, the Ottoman armies would achieve operational mobility through these two divisions. In later dates, the VII Corps would administratively be attached to the Fourth Army, yet it would continue to correspond directly with the Ministry of War.

The Yemen Front was planned to be conducted by being divided into two distinct sub-fronts. The 39th Division, which was to be stationed in the city of Ta'iz, targeted the British directly and the tribes under their protectorate. The operation to be conducted by this division was organized under the name "Ta'iz Mıntıkatü'l-Harekâtı" (Ta'iz Area of Operations). The 40th Division, which was to be stationed in Hodeidah, was tasked with confronting both potential amphibious assaults from the sea and pro-British tribes. The area where the 40th Division was located was designated as the Tihama Area of Operations Command. Mirliva Ali Sait Pasha was appointed to command the 39th Division, and Miralay Hüseyin Ragıp Pasha to the 40th Division, by Mirliva Ahmet Tevfik Pasha, commander of the VII Corps.

The most critical and active sector of the front was the military operations area organized by the Ta'iz Area of Operations. Setting aside tribal attacks, since there was no landing from the coastal side, that is, directly by the British, no military engagement with the British occurred in the Tihama region. However, the region occupied by the 39th Division witnessed severe military engagements toward both Bab-el-Mandeb and Aden.

Further north, the Hejaz Expeditionary Force remained under the independent command of Omer Fakhri Pasha.

== Capture of Cheikh Saïd ==
The 29th Indian Brigade, under Brigadier-General H. V. Cox, CB, then on its way from India to Suez, was ordered to interrupt its voyage to capture Cheikh Saïd and destroy the Ottoman works, armaments, and wells there. On 10 November 1914, transports conveying three battalions of the 29th Indian Brigade and the 23rd Sikh Pioneers arrived off the coast of the peninsula. They were accompanied by the armoured cruiser HMS Duke of Edinburgh, which opened fire on the Ottoman defences while the transports were seeking a satisfactory landing-place. The point that had been at first selected proved impossible on account of the weather, and the troops had to land a little way off under the cover of the fire of the cruiser. They stormed the Ottomans' positions and compelled them to retreat, leaving their field guns behind. The sailors took active part in the fighting with the troops, and a naval demolition party assisted, on 11 November, in destroying the Ottoman fortifications. Having accomplished its task, the British force re-embarked and continued on to Suez. It was not considered advisable at this time to push an expedition inland. The Ottomans, consequently, retained some forces on the northern boundary of the Aden Protectorate.

Seven months later they reoccupied Cheikh Saïd and endeavoured from there to effect a landing on the north coast of Perim. This attack was successfully repulsed by the garrison of the island, the 23rd Sikh Pioneers.

== Land campaign ==
=== Offensives on Baidah ===
On 2 February 1915, the Ottoman Empire invaded the Baidah Sultanate. The Haushabi sent a large force in support of the Baidah Sultan. By the 13th, the Baidah had routed the Ottomans and captured their tents and ammunition. Sometime before the 20th, the Ottomans returned and raided Baidah's outlying villages, before being chased away by a Baidahni force of 1,000 troops, suffering 10 killed and many wounded, as well as losing 3 camels filled with ammunition, shells and tents. The Baidah Sultan expected that the Ottomans would invade again and declared to Britain his intention to defend his country to the last. On his request, Britain sent him ammunition.

On 21 March 1916, Zaidi forces loyal to the Ottoman Empire launched another offensive into the Baidah Sultanate, intending to use Baidah as a springboard for further offensives onto Shihr and Mukalla. Recognizing the threat posed, Britain sent 200 rifles and 30,000 rounds of ammunition to the Baidah Sultan in support. The attack ultimately failed.

=== Battle of Ad-Dakim ===
==== Sultanate of Lahij ====
In July 1915 an Ottoman force from North Yemen crossed the frontier of the Aden hinterland and advanced towards Lahij, which was at this time one of the most important towns in South Arabia and the capital of the Abdali Sultanate of Lahij (Lahaj). Placed in an oasis, surrounded by a fertile plain with the deserts beyond, it was the centre of trade between Aden, a British crown colony, and its hinterland, the princely states under a protectorate. In the years leading up to the war, relations between Britain and Lahij had been friendly, the British paying the sultan a subsidy for the occupation of certain land in the interior and protecting him and his agricultural people against the tribes of the desert, who frequently raided them. Propagandising during the war, British historian F. A. McKenzie wrote of the sultan:

Under our protection the Sultan of Lahaj had waxed very prosperous. His city, with its palace, its gallows— built for ornament rather than use—its purely Oriental life, its fine horses, its little show army, and its constant traffic in camels and caravans, seemed like a vision out of the Arabian Nights. When war broke out the Abdali Sultan proved that his loyalty to Britain was real. Though other tribes turned against us he came to our side and prepared to help us. He soon made himself an object of special detestation to the [Ottoman] and to many of the surrounding tribes by his open and unwavering friendship for Britain.

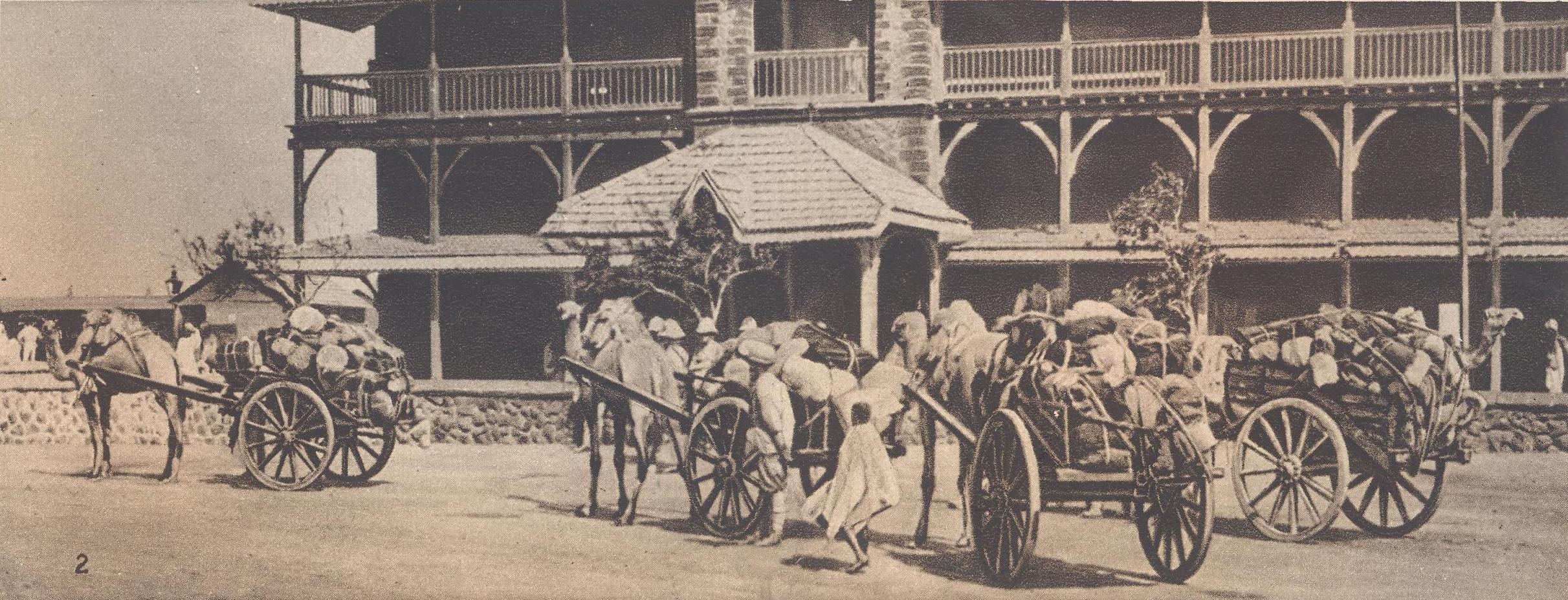
British military transport in Aden.

==== Siege ====
The sultan sent word to General D. G. L. Shaw, commanding the Aden Brigade, that the Ottomans were advancing from Mawiyah to attack him, and asked for help. General Shaw ordered the Aden Movable Column, under Lieutenant-Colonel H. E. A. Pearson, towards Lahij. The Aden Camel Troop was despatched to reconnoitre. It discovered a strong Ottoman force beyond Lahij, supported by a large number of Arab tribesmen. The Camel Troop fell back on Lahij, where it was reinforced by the advance guard of the Movable Column, numbering two hundred and fifty rifles, with two ten-pounder guns. This advance guard had moved up under most trying conditions. The heat was intense, there was great shortage of water, and progress was difficult over the sand. The main body of the Column was so delayed by difficulties of transport and by shortage of water that it did not reach Lahij at all.

The British in the sultan's capital found themselves faced by several thousand Ottoman troops and twenty guns. In addition, Arab tribesmen had rallied by the thousand to help the Ottomans. The British were backed by the few hundred men of the sultan of Lahij's native army. The Arab camp-followers of the Aden detachment deserted them in a body at the most critical hour, taking with them all their camels. Fighting opened on the evening of Sunday, 4 July. The Ottoman forces made several attacks against the British line, but each was driven off. Although after the battle the efforts of the Royal Artillery drew a tribute from General Shaw, the superior Ottoman artillery had kindled fires in different parts of Lahij, and the British were in danger of being outflanked and cut off by the Arab tribal horsemen. The sultan was killed with many of his men. When the main Aden Column never arrived, the British withdrew on 5 July with the loss of three officers wounded, but the main loss was not so much in men as in prestige.

==== Analysis ====
In the official report on the Battle of Ad-Dakim issued by the Government of India much stress was laid on "the intense heat, sand, and shortage of water", and "[t]he desertion of the camel-drivers and the severe climatic conditions so delayed and distressed the main body as to necessitate a withdrawal from Lahij". McKenzie notes that "we do not seem to have made such arrangements for transport and for water supply as would have prepared us for the difficulties which every experienced traveller knew we would have to face. . . But the severe heat of the climate, the potential treachery of hired Arabs, and the shortage of water were all of them factors which had been familiar from the beginning to the Indian authorities, and, one might suppose, ought to have been allowed for."

=== Reinforcements from India ===
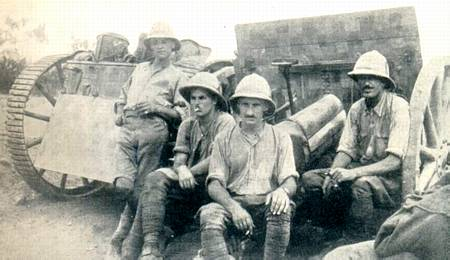
Gunners of B Battery, Honourable Artillery Company (HAC) at Sheik Othman, 1915

After the debacle at Lahij, the British force fell back on the Kawr. The Ottomans followed them up and occupied Shaikh Othman, a town about two miles inland from the harbour of Aden. This place was formerly part of the Sultanate of Lahij, within the British protectorate. The Ottomans at this stage held practically the whole of the Aden hinterland, except immediately around the crown colony itself. They had reoccupied Cheikh Saïd and had destroyed Lahij. The Indian authorities, under Commander-in-Chief Beauchamp Duff, decided to increase the Aden garrison after "subsequent Turkish victories". Major-General Sir George J. Younghusband, a soldier with a distinguished career, succeeded to the command of the Aden Brigade.

On 20 July 1915, troops from the Aden Brigade, the 28th Indian Brigade, 1/B Battery, HAC, 1/1st Berkshire Battery, RHA, and a detachment of Sappers and Miners, under the command of Lieutenant-Colonel A. M. S. Elsmie, a soldier well trained in frontier fighting, surprised the Ottomans at Shaikh Othman, completely defeated them and drove them out of the place. Between fifty and sixty Ottoman soldiers were killed and wounded, and several hundred men, mostly Arab tribesmen, were made prisoners. This success was followed up in the following month by an attack by a small column on an Ottoman post between Lahij and Shaikh Othman. The Ottomans were driven from the town. Another attack in a different direction was equally successful. Reports reached Aden that the Ottomans were preparing to retire from Lahij itself, and in September a column under Colonel Elsmie set out in the direction of Waht. Here it surprised a force of seven hundred Ottomans, with eight guns, who were supported by about a thousand Arabs. The Ottomans were driven back, and Waht fell to the British troops, who had been aided both on sea and land by the cooperation of the cruiser HMS Philomel of the New Zealand Naval Forces, under Captain Percival Hill-Thompson.

=== Ottoman claims of victory ===
A series of minor engagements and skirmishes between the Ottomans and Arabs and the British followed, during which the latter were generally successful, but found it impossible to hold the country far inland. Early in 1916 the Ottomans claimed that the British had been driven back on to Aden itself, and had retreated to within range of the covering fire of their warships, where they had been inactive for some months. Many of the Ottoman claims were greatly exaggerated, and some wholly false. In February 1916, Major John Pretyman Newman, MP, asked in the British Parliament for any information about the fighting near Aden. Austen Chamberlain, then Secretary of State for India, responded that the Ottoman claim of success which had recently been put forward would seem to have been founded on an engagement which took place on 12 January between a reconnoitring column of the Aden garrison and an Ottoman force in the neighbourhood of Shaikh Othman. The loss on our side was one British officer and thirty-five Indian rank and file killed, and four British and thirty-five Indian rank and file wounded. The enemy losses were severe, amounting to about two hundred killed and wounded. The British column was neither annihilated nor defeated, but withdrew when the purpose of the movement was completed, Chamberlain said.

Later on, the Ottomans officially claimed to have scored a substantial victory in further heavy fighting around Shaikh Othman and Bir Ahmad. This was a sheer invention. In January 1916, the Aden Movable Column moved out to protect some friendly troops to the east of the Aden Protectorate against Ottoman troops who had been sent to coerce them. The column located the Ottoman force near Subar, and defeated it. The general position was so unsatisfactory, however, that in April 1916, it was decided, on the suggestion of the Government of India, that ladies should not be allowed to land at Aden without receiving permission from the Commander-in-Chief in India.

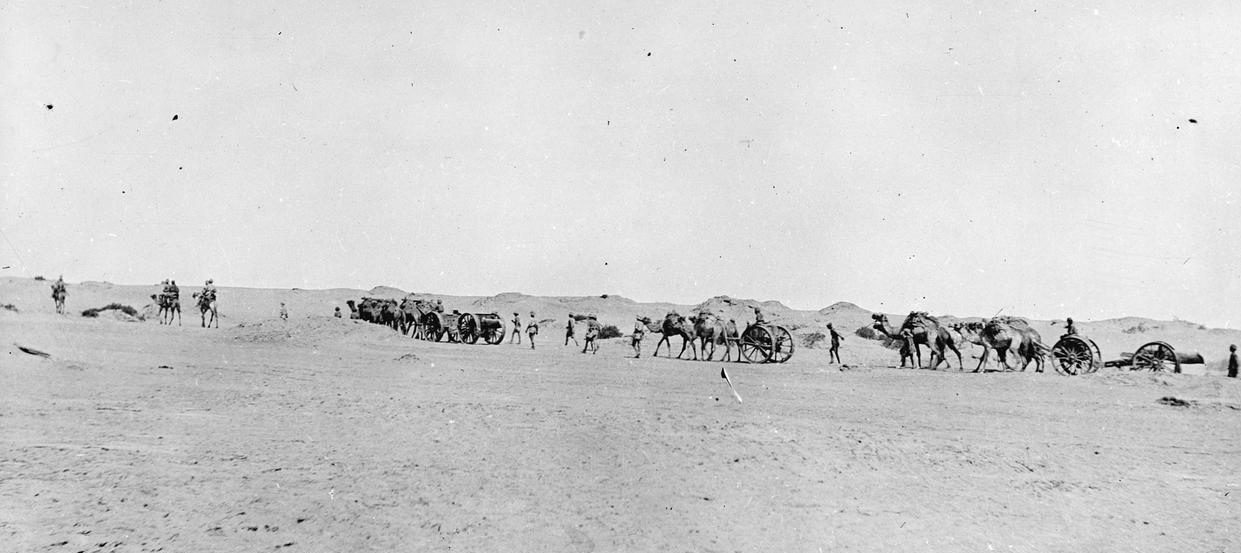
British Camel Battery of BLC 15 pounder guns after the capture of Hatum on 5 January 1918. Teams of four camels in two pairs are seen towing a gun and limber at left and right of picture. In the centre appears to be an ammunition limber towed by three camels.

=== Stalemate ===
The eruption of the British-sponsored Arab Revolt in the Hejaz diverted Ottoman attention from Aden in the summer of 1916. Those Ottoman troops which remained reverted to the defensive, while the British built an eleven-mile-long defensive perimeter around Aden. They did not attempt to resecure lost territories in the hinterland, and no major fighting with the British took place after 1916.

In October 1915, the Ahl Haydara Mansur sided with the Ottoman Empire in opposition to the Fadhli Sultanate, which was a British vassal. The tribesmen brought sacrifices of cattle to the Ottoman commander in South Arabia, Saeed Bey, asking for his support and stating they had been mistreated by the Fadhli. Saeed advised the tribesmen to raid the trade routes in the Fadhli sultanate and promised to look into their grievances later. A truce between the Ahl Haydara Mansur and Fadhli had been arrived at by 10 March 1916.

In December 1916, Ahmad bin Yahya launched a military revolt against his father (Imam Yahya), after having sought aid from the British-allied Idrisid Emirate of Asir the preceding month. The reason laid in opposition to the governing Ottomans (who his father was allied to), who had allegedly fired at Mecca, killing "learned men", and firing on the Kaaba. He was supported by Hashid and Bakeel, Hamdan, Bani Harith, and Bani Matar tribesmen. His revolt began in the country of the Bani Matar. By 23 December, Ahmad was besieging Sanaa. By 28 March 1917, Ahmad had surrendered to his father.

=== Kathiri campaign ===
Starting in 1915, al-Mansur b. Ghalib al-Kathiri, the Kathiri Sultan, corresponded with ‘Ali Sa‘id Basha, the Ottoman military commander at Lahej through the former's envoy, Bin ‘Ubaydillah. al-Mansur hoped to gain Ottoman support to defeat his historical rival, the British-aligned Qu'aiti Sultanate, and rule Hadhramaut as a sultan under Ottoman suzerainty. Basha encouraged al-Mansur to ally himself with the Ottoman Empire, but could not make realistic promises of military support. By October 1917, open conflict had broken out between the Kathiri and the Qu'aiti; on the 13th, James Stewart, the resident at Aden, reported that the Qu'aiti had destroyed two Kathiri dhars (military posts) in a recent engagement near Seiyun. On 22 December 1917, it was reported that the Kathiris had attacked Qu'aiti troops at Bab-es-Sir.

Contrary to their sultan, al-Mansur's subjects wished to maintain good relations with Britain and considered the conflict contrary to their economic interests. Facing increasing domestic pressure and an absence of Ottoman military support, al-Mansur lacked the political capital to continue hostilities. On 7 June 1918, al-Mansur signed the Aden agreement, placing the Kathiri Sultanate under Qu'aiti sovereignty and, by extension, subsuming it into the Aden Protectorate. al-Ghurfa, under the influence of the Bin 'Abdat dynasty, rejected the Aden agreement and seceded from the Kathiri Sultanate, remaining independent until 1945.

=== End of the campaign ===
On 30 October 1918, the Ottoman Empire signed the Armistice of Mudros, where it agreed to surrender all its garrisons outside of Anatolia. However, the armistice failed to be immediately effective on Ottoman forces in Yemen, as some commanders initially refused to surrender:

- Some Ottoman officials (such as Ottoman governor Mahmood Nadim) refused to surrender to Britain as this would bolster the British political position in the region, instead preferring to align themselves with Imam Yahya, who was establishing the Mutawakkilite Kingdom of Yemen.
- In contrast, other Ottoman officials (such as Ismail Effendi, commanding troops at Taiz), refused to lay down their arms in the absence of British forces, as this would bolster Imam Yahya.
  - This also included 12 local sheikhs who wanted to the placed under British sovereignty, as this would allow them to remain independent within their own territory while receiving a stipend, whereas the Imam would make them pay tithes.
- Some Ottoman officials in Asir were still owed debts and demanded to be paid 100,000 pounds before surrendering. These forces surrendered at Al Luḩayyah (10 January 1919), Al Hudaydah (by 16 January) and Cheikh Saïd (19 January) after Britain and the Idrisid Emirate of Asir provided the requested money, before being embarked to Suez from Kamran Island on 7 February.
- Elias Bey, Sheikh of Bajil and Kuhra, did not surrender before conferring with the Ottoman envoy from Constantinople, who arrived at Al Hudaydah on 13 January 1919 and explained the political situation.
- Colonel Ghalib Bey, commanding forces at Az Zaydiyah, did not believe that the Ottomans had actually signed an armistice and refused to obey orders from the Commander-in-Chief of Yemen, Mahmud Tewfik Pasha, to surrender, instead opting to fight to the death. Az Zaydiyah fell to the Idrisid Emirate of Asir in March 1919.

On 15 December 1918, Britain recaptured Lahej from Ottoman forces in a swift military operation. By 14 February 1919, 3100 Ottomans of all ranks remained active in Yemen. By 31 March, all Ottoman forces in Yemen had surrendered, and Mahmud Tewfik Pasha, commander-in-chief of Yemen, was in Aden.

== Naval campaign ==
=== Uses of the South Arabian ports during the war ===
On 18 October 1914, a convoy of ten troopships carrying the New Zealand Expeditionary Force was escorted by the Imperial Japanese battlecruiser Ibuki out of Wellington. It joined a group of twenty-eight ships carrying the First Australian Imperial Force, and the total convoy, with Ibuki and the Australian cruiser HMAS Sydney, crossed the ocean, which was being patrolled by the Japanese protected cruiser Chikuma. While Sydney was sidetracked, and ended up in the Battle of Cocos, the rest of the convoy reached Aden on 25 October.

On 9 November 1914, a small landing party, numbering five officers, one surgeon, and forty-seven petty officers and men, under Lieutenant Hellmuth von Mücke, was separated from their ship, the SMS Emden during the Battle of Cocos, and piloted the Ayesha to the Dutch port of Padang on the west coast of Sumatra. There von Mücke arranged a rendezvous with the German freighter Choising, which transported him and his men to the Ottoman city of Hodeida in Yemen. Once on the Arabian Peninsula, von Mücke and his men experienced months of delay securing the assistance of local Turkish officials to return to Germany. At last he decided to lead his men on an over-water voyage up the east coast of the Red Sea to Jiddah. Ultimately, Von Mücke and forty-eight of his men returned to Berlin.

When the Arabs of the revolt of June 1916 attacked the port of Jiddah, they were supported by the seaplane carrier HMS Ben-my-Chree, based at Aden.

=== Occupation of Kamaran ===
On 17 February 1915, the British Resident in Aden, Brigadier William Crawford Walton, wired the Government of India that dhows bearing telegrams, mail and money from Jeddah had made it to Ottoman headquarters in Yemen, and that it was necessary that these be stopped. He proposed the occupation of Kamaran with 200 men from the RMS Empress of Russia, the RMS Empress of Asia and HMS Minto. This had the support of the Admiralty, the Commander-in-Chief at Port Said—who wished to use Kamaran as a "naval base for small vessels"—and the India Office, which duly informed the Viceroy of India to give the necessary orders. The viceroy demurred, fearing that the local population would be "unlikely to acquiesce", that an occupation might "alarm the Idrisi", was likely to be misunderstood by Muslims, and would reduce the defences of Aden, at just the moment when the Turks were advancing. On 3 March the India Office rescinded its order, but when intelligence suggested that some Germans stranded in Massawa in Italian Eritrea at the outbreak of war were attempting to sail across the sea to Arabia, the resident renewed his request for 200 men (7 March). Again the viceroy refused (11 March).

== Aftermath ==
The collapse of Ottoman Yemen allowed Imam Yahya to establish the Kingdom of Yemen's independence. In 1919, shortly after the end of World War I, Yemen found itself in conflict with the Emirate of Asir.

On 5 February 1919, after the Ottoman surrender, it was reported that Ali Othman, the Kaymakam (Ottoman district governor) of Mauza (east of Mocha), had informed the Sultan of Lahej that he had rifles and ammunition, 5 guns, and about 50 mules and some camels left behind by the Ottoman troops, and asked for orders. He did not wish to hand them over to Imam Yahya and desired to keep his current position. The British response was that the materiel should be surrendered through British-controlled Sheikh Said, though James Stewart, the resident of Aden, doubted Othman's sincerity.

In May 1919, Sheikh Muhammad Hassan, the leader of the Shafais at Jabal Habeshi, attacked and captured Mokha, but abandoned it very shortly afterward. He then tried to attack Mauza, which was held by Ali Othman, but failed to do so. On the 21st, after Hassan's unsuccessful attack on Mauza, it was again reported that Ali Othman was prepared to surrender to Britain.

On 29 July, it was reported that Muhammad Hassan was preparing to drive Ali Othman out of Mocha which the latter had reoccupied on the former's withdrawal, and subsequently attack Mauza as well, but these attacks failed and Ali Othman remained in possession of both places. However, Mocha was nearly deserted by this time with only 20-30 of its inhabitants remaining as of 4 September.

On 17 August 1919, Ali Othman arrived at Hays to ask Mahomed el Wazir, one the Imam's lieutenants, for assistance against Muhammad Hassan. Mahomed el Wazir arrested Ali Othman on the spot. Soon afterwards, Yemeni forces seized Ali Othman's ammunition stockpiles in Mauza.

By 1920, Ali Othman and Muhammad Hassan were both serving for Imam Yahya.
