= Ahl Haydara Mansur =

Tribe in Yemen

Coordinates: 13.28333°N 45.33333°E

Location of the Ahl Haydara Mansur tribal area within Yemen

The Ahl Haydara Mansur are a tribe in Yemen.

== History ==
In c. 1875, the Ahl Haydara Mansur broke away from the Fadhli Sultanate and assumed independence.

In October 1915, during World War I, the Ahl Haydara Mansur sided with the Ottoman Empire in opposition to the Fadhli. The tribesmen brought sacrifices of cattle to the Ottoman commander in South Arabia, Saeed Bey, asking for his support and stating they had been mistreated by the Fadhli. Saeed advised the tribesmen to raid the trade routes in the Fadhli sultanate and promised to look into their grievances later. A truce between the Ahl Haydara Mansur and Fadhli had been arrived at by 10 March 1916.

In July 1935, the Ahl Haydara Mansur killed 6 travellers in their territory. A heavy fine was exacted from them by the British under threat of air bombardment.

In November 1936, the Ahl Haydara Mansur were fined to the point of "total ruination" for robbing the Aden road and continuing to defy the Fadhli sultan.

In 1937, following another incident, British authorities pushed the Fadhli sultan into reasserting his authority over the Ahl Haydara Mansur. Fadhli troops accompanied by the Royal Air Force forcefully re-established the Fadhli Sultanate's control over this tribe after attacking their home town at Ad Dirjaj, ending over 60 years of independence.

== Tribal area ==
The Ahl Haydara Mansur have an allocated tribal area within Yemen. It is located in Khanfir district in Abyan Governorate, in the southwestern part of the country, 260 km southeast of Sanaa, the country's capital. The warmest month is May, at 35°C, and the coldest is January, at 27°C. The average rainfall is 96 millimetres per year. The wettest month is September, with 17 millimetres of rain, and the driest is December, with 1 millimetre.

== See also ==
- South Arabia during World War I
- Tribes of Yemen
