= Said Karam District =

District in Afghanistan

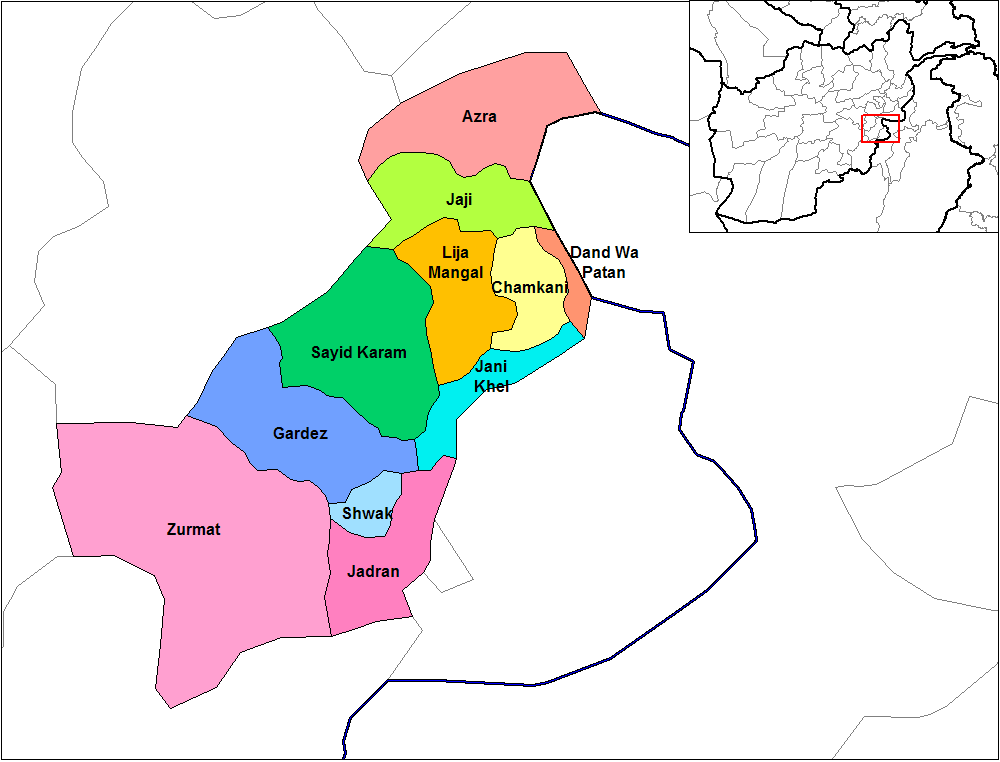
Districts of Paktia Province

Said Karam (Pashto: سيدکرم ولسوالۍ) is a district in Paktia Province, Afghanistan. The main town in the district is Khandkhel. The district is within the heartland of the Muqbil tribe of Pashtuns. Villages in the Said Karam district are Khandkhel (خڼخیل), Khunderkhel (کندر خیل), Goud Qala Mangal (ګډقلعه منګل), Chino Klalai (چینو کلا), Shaiyesta Kalay (شایسته کلا) and Shaikhan Kalay (توتاخېل).

== Demographics & population ==
No exact population numbers are available. The Afghan Ministry of Rural Rehabilitation & Development (MRRD) along with UNHCR and Central Statistics Office (CSO) of Afghanistan estimated the population of the district to be around 42,967 (CSO 2004).

== Notable people ==
- Mohammad Najibullah, President of Afghanistan from 1987 to 1992
- Mohammad Ashraf Naseri
- wahabudin sadaat

== See also ==
- Khandkhel
