= Na'wah (Upper Yafa) =

Na'wah or Nawa (Arabic: نعوة) was a sheikhdom and dependency of Upper Yafa. It was a section of the Mawsata.

== History ==
Na'wah was a dependency of Upper Yafa. It was placed within the British sphere of influence in the Anglo-Ottoman Convention of 1914. However, it never signed a protectorate treaty with Britain.

In 1908, Britain fined Na'wah $1200 for aggression against Al-Dhubi.

In February 1915, during World War I, one of the sheikhs of Na'wah submitted to the Ottomans, although another refused to comply with the Ottoman summons.

It was annexed by the Mutawakkilite Kingdom of Yemen after the end of World War I, alongside Rubeaten (another Upper Yafa dependency) and later the Beda Sultanate.

== Geography ==
Na'wah laid on the frontier between Ottoman and British Yemen, to the north-east of Qa'tabah, and on the left bank of the Wadi Bana. It contained several villages and hamlets. One village, located 5 miles (8 km) from Wadi Bana, was called Na'wah. Another village under the Na'wah was Ar-Razaim.

== Government ==
As of 1915, Na'wah was ruled by 4 sheikhs.

== Foreign relations ==
In 1913, Na'wah has an emissary from the Imam of Yemen. For a long time, there was close commerce between Na'wah, Juban and Upper Yafa.

== Demographics ==
As of 1915, Na'wah had 4000 inhabitants.

== Military ==
As of 1915, Na'wah had 500 fighting men.
