= Aden Brigade =

British Indian Army formation

- Active: After 1903, 1960s
- Country: United Kingdom (British Raj) British India
- Allegiance: (British Raj) British Indian Army
- Branch: Infantry
- Type: Brigade
- Role: Defence of Aden
- Garrison: Aden, Aden Province
- Battles: World War I; South Arabia Campaign; Aden Emergency

Commanders
- Commander (Early): Major General James Alexander Bell

The Aden Brigade was a formation of the British Indian Army formed after 1903 and the Kitchener Reforms. It was commanded by Major General James Alexander Bell.

In August 1914, Connelly writes that the British force in Aden Settlement consisted of only two battalions, one British and the other Indian, and a cavalry troop 'barely 100 strong' under the control of the Political Resident, Aden. On the outbreak of war, the British battalion, 1st Battalion, Royal Irish Rifles, was recalled to Britain, leaving the defences weaker.

Other units claimed as part of the brigade during the First World War included the 109th Infantry, and the 61st, 70th, and 76th Batteries Royal Garrison Artillery.

The British Army also formed an Aden Brigade to deal with the Aden Emergency in the 1960s.
