= Khandkhel =

- Town
- Location
- Coordinates: 33.7166357°N 69.3660712°E
- Country: Afghanistan
- Province: Paktia
- District: Said Karam
- Elevation: 2,513 m (8,245 ft)
- Time zone: +4:30

Khandkhel (Pashto: خڼ خېل) or Khand Khil is a town in the Said Karam District of Paktia Province, Afghanistan. It is located 25 km to the northeast of Gardez, the capital of Paktia, and is 40 km to the southwest of Aryob.

== Climate ==
Khandkhel features a humid continental climate (Dfb) under the Köppen climate classification. It has warm summers and cold, snowy winters. The average temperature in Khandkhel is 8.0 °C (46.4 °F), while the annual precipitation averages 730 millimetres (28.7 in). October is the driest month with 27 millimetres (1.1 in) of rainfall, while April, the wettest month, has an average precipitation of 93 millimetres (3.7 in).

July is the warmest month of the year with an average temperature of 19.0 °C (66.2 °F). The coldest month January has an average temperature of −5.6 °C (21.9 °F).

Climate data for Khandkhel
| Month | Jan | Feb | Mar | Apr | May | Jun | Jul | Aug | Sep | Oct | Nov | Dec | Year |
|---|---|---|---|---|---|---|---|---|---|---|---|---|---|
| Record high °C (°F) | 13.2 (55.8) | 18.4 (65.1) | 23.9 (75.0) | 26.3 (79.3) | 32.4 (90.3) | 34.8 (94.6) | 35.6 (96.1) | 33.1 (91.6) | 30.2 (86.4) | 26.2 (79.2) | 21.7 (71.1) | 18.0 (64.4) | 35.6 (96.1) |
| Mean daily maximum °C (°F) | −1.8 (28.8) | −1.9 (28.6) | 5.1 (41.2) | 13.8 (56.8) | 19.5 (67.1) | 23.2 (73.8) | 24.9 (76.8) | 23.8 (74.8) | 20.8 (69.4) | 15.7 (60.3) | 8.6 (47.5) | 2.9 (37.2) | 12.9 (55.2) |
| Daily mean °C (°F) | −5.6 (21.9) | −5.1 (22.8) | 1.3 (34.3) | 8.5 (47.3) | 13.5 (56.3) | 17.1 (62.8) | 19.0 (66.2) | 18.2 (64.8) | 15.3 (59.5) | 10.5 (50.9) | 4.0 (39.2) | −1.3 (29.7) | 8.0 (46.3) |
| Mean daily minimum °C (°F) | −9.3 (15.3) | −8.3 (17.1) | −2.6 (27.3) | 3.1 (37.6) | 7.5 (45.5) | 10.9 (51.6) | 13.1 (55.6) | 12.5 (54.5) | 9.7 (49.5) | 5.2 (41.4) | −0.6 (30.9) | −5.5 (22.1) | 3.0 (37.4) |
| Record low °C (°F) | −26.7 (−16.1) | −29.5 (−21.1) | −20.4 (−4.7) | −10.8 (12.6) | −4.5 (23.9) | 1.2 (34.2) | 4.8 (40.6) | 3.5 (38.3) | −3.8 (25.2) | −6.2 (20.8) | −13.3 (8.1) | −24.2 (−11.6) | −29.5 (−21.1) |
| Average precipitation mm (inches) | 48 (1.9) | 72 (2.8) | 79 (3.1) | 93 (3.7) | 81 (3.2) | 66 (2.6) | 83 (3.3) | 79 (3.1) | 45 (1.8) | 27 (1.1) | 27 (1.1) | 30 (1.2) | 730 (28.9) |
Source 1: Climate-Data.org
Source 2: NASA Power (Extremes 1990-2021)

== See also ==
- Paktia Province
