= Musaymir =

- Location in Yemen
- Coordinates: 13°26′35″N 44°36′55″E
- Country: Yemen
- Governorate: Abyan
- Time zone: UTC+3 (Yemen Standard Time)

Musaymir is a village in south-western Yemen. It is located in the Abyan Governorate.

== History ==
Formerly Musaymir was the capital of the Haushabi Sultanate.
