= Aulaqi =

Aulaqi, Awlaki, or Awlaqi may refer to:

== People ==
- Anwar al-Awlaki (1971–2011), Yemeni-American imam and reported member of al-Qaeda in the Arabian Peninsula
- Abdulrahman al-Awlaki (1995–2011), son of Anwar al-Awlaki and American citizen killed in U.S. drone strike
- Nasser al-Awlaki, former Yemeni minister of agriculture and Anwar al-Awlaki's father
- Nawar al-Awlaki (2008–2017), daughter of Anwar al-Awlaki and American citizen killed in U.S. drone strike
- Nihal Ali al-Awlaqi, Minister of Legal Affairs in Yemen
- Saeed Aulaqi (born 1940), Yemeni dramatist and fiction writer
- Muhammad Saleh al-Aulaqi (1938–1973), Yemeni politician and diplomat
- Sa'ad bin Atef al-Awlaki, (born between 1978 and 1983) Yemeni leader of Al-Qaeda in the Arabian Peninsula

== Places ==
- Lower Aulaqi Sultanate, former state in British Aden Protectorate
- Upper Aulaqi Sheikhdom, former state in British Aden Protectorate
- Upper Aulaqi Sultanate, former state in British Aden Protectorate
