= Saeed Aulaqi =

Yemeni dramatist and fiction writer

Saeed Aulaqi (born 1940) is a Yemeni dramatist and fiction writer. His story "The Succession" has been translated into English and was anthologized in two anthologies published in the West (The Literature of Modern Arabia, 1988 and Modern Literatures of the Non-Western World, 1995). As a playwright, he has tackled revolutionary themes and published a number of plays:

- Nidaa' al-Ard (The Land's Call)
- Fawq al-Jabal (On the Mountaintop)
- al-Qawi Wa l-Aqwa (The Strong and the Stronger)
- at-Tirka (The Inheritance)
- Mashrou' Zawaaj (The Marriage Project)
- al-Mahzala al-Idaariyya (The Administrative Farce).

He also wrote a comprehensive history of the theatre in Yemen entitled Sab’oun ‘Aaman Min al-Masrah Fi l-Yaman (Seventy Years of Yemeni Theatre, 1980).

According to the German scholar Gunther Orth, Aulaqi was born in 1946 in Aden.
