= Zaraniq rebellion (1925–1929) =

The Zaraniq rebellion (Arabic: معركة القوقر) was an armed conflict in the lower Tihamah between the Mutawakkilite Kingdom of Yemen and the rebellious Zaraniq tribe that took place from 1925 to 1929. It has been referred to as a revolt, a civil war, as well as various other terms. It began in late 1925, and near the end of that year the Zaraniq would win a major battle against the Yemeni government. Over the next 2 years, large-scale fighting stagnated, with the only fighting taking place in the form of occasional raids. The rebels received arms supplies from Britain through the Ghulaifiqa port. By 1928, the rebels controlled an area stretching from Mansuriyah to Zabid. In June 1928, the Kingdom of Hejaz and Nejd sent 500 troops to aid the rebels. In October 1928, the Yemeni government dispatched an army to quell the rebellion, under the command of Sayf al-Islam Ahmad. Sayf marched from Sana'a to Bajil. At Bajil, he gave out that he intended to attack the Zaraniq capital of Bayt al-Faqih. However, this was merely a feint: Sayf instead attacked and captured the important rebel port of al-Ta'if. Despite the fall of al-Ta'if, rebel fortunes would see a temporary resurgence: A second army marching from al-Mukha was surprised and routed by the rebels. Bayt al-Faqih also resisted Sayf's attacks for most of 1929. These successes convinced the leader of the Zaraniq, Ahmed el Fiteini, to submit an appeal to the League of Nations for formal recognition as an independent state. However, the government's superior firepower would prove to be an insurmountable problem for the rebels, and in early October 1929 Bayt al-Faqih fell to the government and the Zaraniq surrendered, ending the rebellion.

After the quelling of the revolt, a tract of land was expropriated by the Imam and the Al Hudaydah canal was constructed from the point where the wadi emerged onto a coastal plain to irrigate this tract of land. Although this new upstream canal initially took a small quantity of water, it took water throughout the year, thereby violating the principle that new lands should not be irrigated with low flows. The precedent created was used by landowners on the south bank to abstract the low flow as well. As their canals were much larger, they took the entire low flow at the expense of the downstream users.
