= Muqbil =

Pashtun tribe

The Muqbil (Pashto: مقبل) is a Pashtun tribe, cousins of the Zadrans and Mangals. They mostly reside in Said Karam District, Paktia Province and also can be found in large numbers in Kurram living beside the Bangash and Mangal Pashtuns. They can be further divided into five clans: Musakhel, Sultak, Ahmadkhel, Hasankhel, and Bobaki.

== Notable people ==
- Muqbil al-Wadi'i
- Muqbil al-Zahawi

== Sources ==
- Ethnic Identity in Afghanistan, Center for Culture and Conflict Studies, US Naval Postgraduate School
