= Emirate of Dhala =

Former state

Coordinates: 13°41′N 44°43′E

Emirate of Dhala إمارة الضالع
- early 19th century–1967
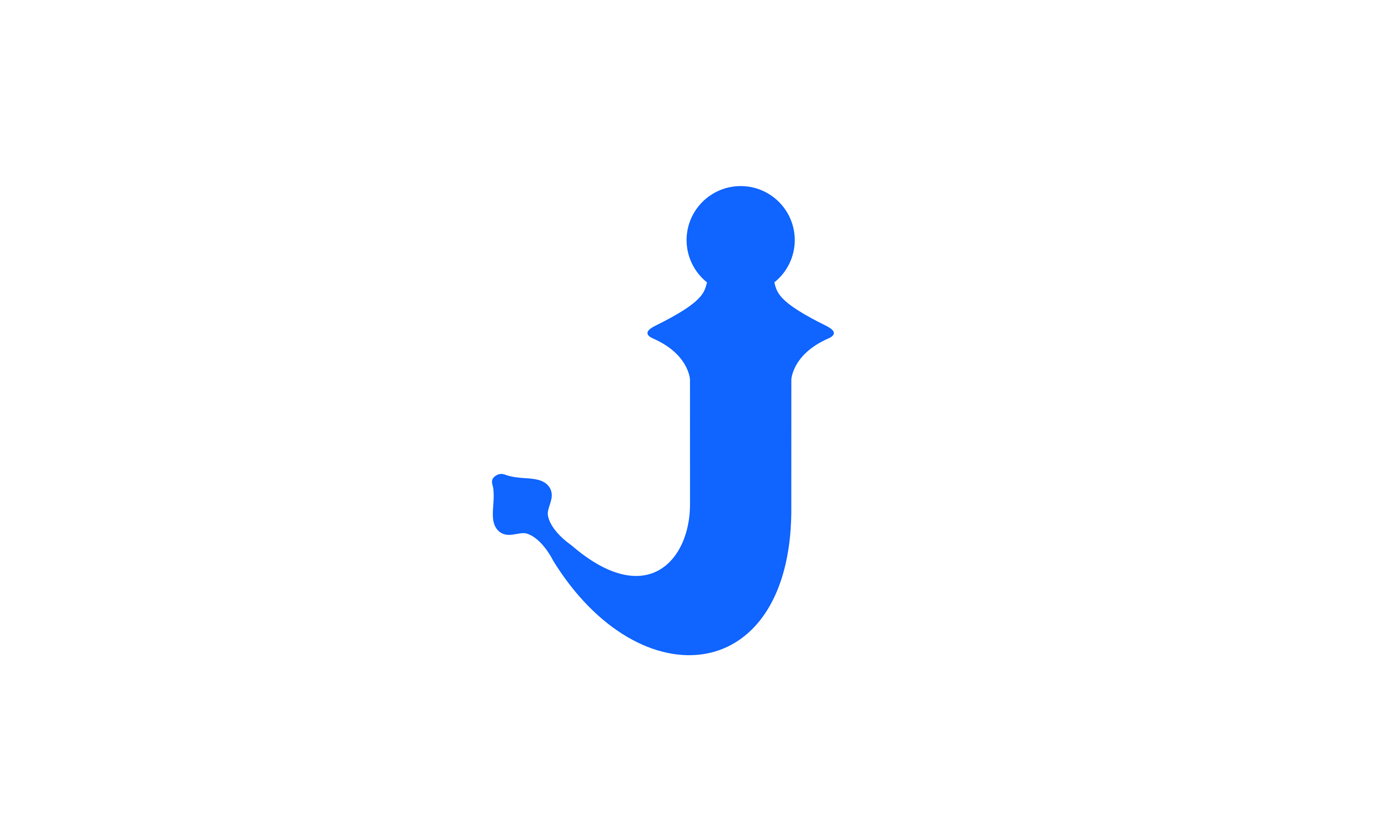
- Left: Flag of the Emirate; Right: Royal Standard of the Emir

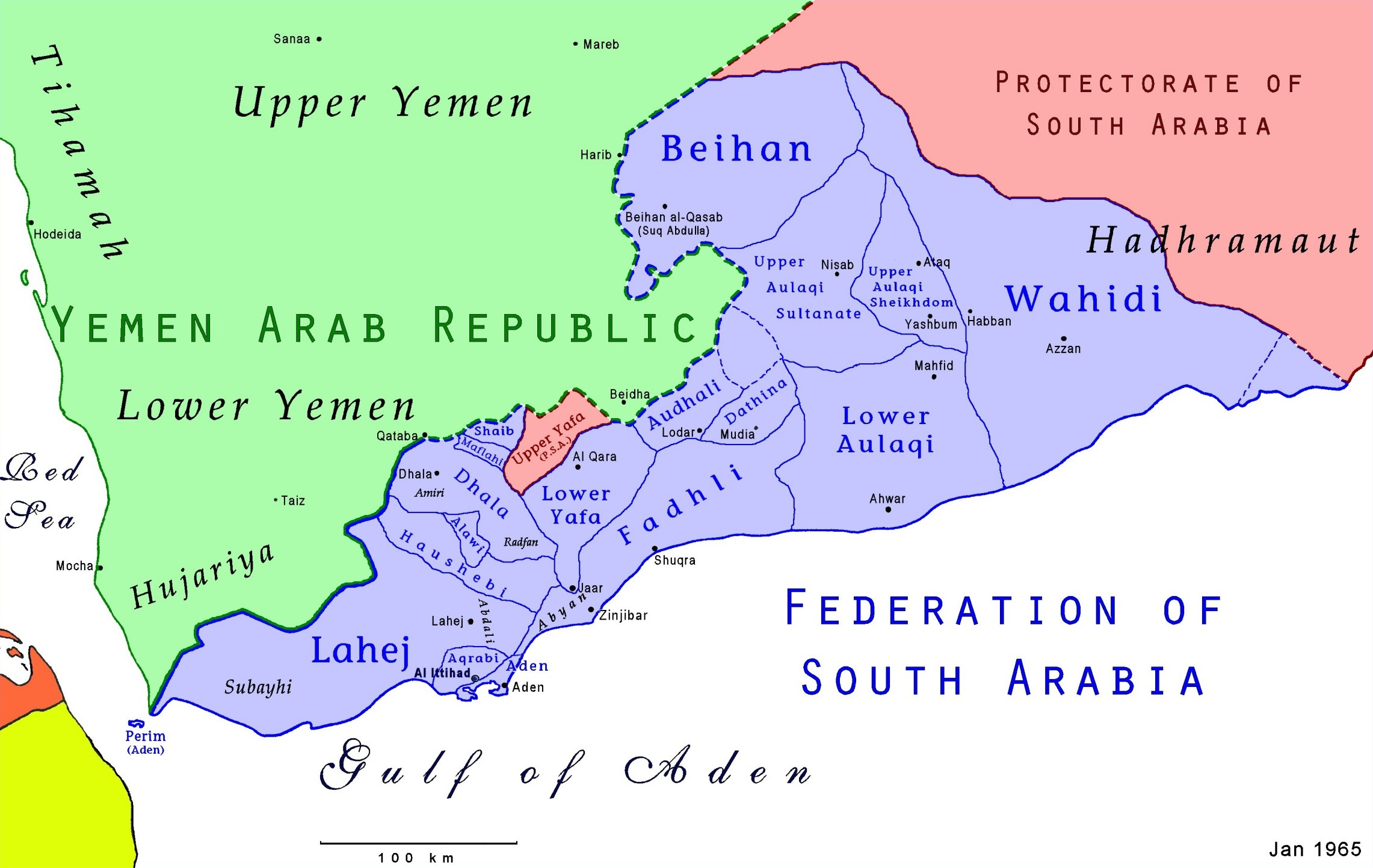
- Map of the Federation of South Arabia
- Status: State of the Federation of South Arabia
- Capital: Dhala
- Government: Monarchy
- Emir
- History
  - Established: early 19th century
  - Disestablished: 1967

Population
  - 1946: 50,000
Succeeded by
South Yemen
- Today part of: Yemen

Dhala or Dhali` (Arabic: الضالع aḍ-Ḍāliʿ), Amiri (Arabic: الأميري al-Amīrī), or the Emirate of Dhala (Arabic: إمارة الضالع Imārat aḍ-Ḍāliʿ) was a state in the British Aden Protectorate, the Federation of Arab Emirates of the South, and its successor, the Federation of South Arabia. Its capital was Dhala (Ad Dali').

== History ==
The group of tribes ruled over by the Amir of Dhala occupies the district north-west of the Alawi country on the high road to Sanaa.

On the death in 1872 of the then Amir, Shafal bin Abdul Hadi, his nephew, Ali bin Muqbil, was recognised by the British Government as his successor. In the following year he was required by the Turkish authorities to make his submission to the Porte, a Turkish Superintendent was appointed to Dhala, a detachment of Turkish troops was quartered there, and the Amir was required to give a hostage for his good behaviour, who was to reside at Taiz. He was afterwards summoned by the Turks to Qataba and imprisoned there, but effected his escape. Muhammad bin Musaid, who had been appointed Amir by the Turks in the place of his nephew Ali bin Muqbil, was killed, and his son, Abdulla bin Muhammad, was recognised by them as his successor. He continued to resist Ali bin Muqbil till 1878, when, Turkish support having been withdrawn from his rival, Ali bin Muqbil resumed his position as Amir of the tribes, with the loss, however, of several of his villages which had, some voluntarily and some under pressure, yielded allegiance to the Ottomans.

In 1880 the Amir signed an agreement by which he became a British stipendiary, receiving 50 dollars a year. This allowance was afterwards doubled.

In September 1886 Ali bin Muqbil died, and was succeeded by his cousin, Shaif bin Seif, to whom the stipend was continued.

In 1881 the Quteibi tribe became restless, and began to exact dues on the Hardaba route. In 1884 it was found necessary to support the Amir with a few sabres of the Aden troop and some sappers. They destroyed some of the Ahl-ath-Thumeiri forts, and the Quteibi then tendered their submission. But they soon resumed their independent position, and it was not until 1888, when the Resident met the Hausbnbi, the Dhala Amir and others to settle a schedule of rates to he levied on qaftlalis, that the Quteibi and Ahl-ath-Thumeiri formally reorganised the Amir as their superior.

The years 1889 to 1900 were marked by the continued restlessness of the Quteibi, who failed to keep the settlements made in 1888, and by the encroachments of the Turks.

In 1901 and the beginning of 1902, the Turks occupied Jaleila, Mafari and Jebel Jeliaf.

An Anglo-Turkish boundary commission met at Dhala in February 1902. The Turks claimed the whole of the Shairi, Jebel Jehaf and Mafari districts, but after a year spent in correspondence between the British Government and the Porte, and the increase of the force accompanying the British Commissioner, the Turkish garrisons were withdrawn. In March 1903 an Irade was issued at Constantinople decreeing the commencement of the delimitation. By October the frontier had been demarcated, including on the British side the Shaibi tribes, the Amiri villages in the Wadi As Safiya and the Humeidi and Ahmedi tribes.

In November 1903 successful operations were undertaken against the Quteibi who had attacked the post at As Suleik.

In November 1904 a further Treaty was concluded with the Amir. Under clause IX of this Treaty the Amir agreed to keep a force of 50 men to help him to carry out his obligations under the Treaty for which he was granted a monthly payment of 100 dollars in addition to his stipend.

In 1906 the Shairi rebelled against the Amir. They were joined by the tribesmen of Jebel Jehaf, and some fighting ensued. The Ahmedi tribe on the river Tiban also became disaffected and refused to admit the Amir’s suzerainty.

In January 1907 the main body of British troops left Dhala for Aden. The remaining troops and the Political Agent, Dhala, were withdrawn in the following September.

On 22 December 1911 Amir Shaif died and was succeeded by his eldest son, Nasr bin Shaif, to whom was continued the stipend paid to his father.

In 1915 the Quteibi Shaikh Muhammad Salih al Akkra signed an Agreement similar to those signed about the same time by the Haushabi Sultan and the Alawi Shaikh for the safety of the trade routes passing through his territory. The ratification of this agreement was postponed. Under the terms of this agreement the Shaikh was allowed a monthly payment of 50 dollars.

On the outbreak of the Great War in 1914, Amir Nasr submitted to the Turks when they entered the Aden Protectorate. After the war he wrote asking for pardon. The Abdali Sultan and the Quteibi Shaikh also pleaded for him. He came to Aden in November 1919 and gave an explanation which was accepted as satisfactory, and he was pardoned; but while he was still in Aden, the Imam of Sanaa occupied Dhala.

In January 1920 Amir Nasr, with the help of the Radfan tribes and with assistance in money, arms and ammunition from the Aden Residency, made an attack on Dhala and reoccupied it, but lost it on the following day owing to a Zeidi counterattack, the Amir taking refuge in Lahej. In 1920, the British Government increased the Amir’s stipend to Rs.. 700 and in 1926 to Rs. 800, in compensation for his financial losses due to his enforced exile. The extra hundred rupees, granted in 1920, ceased in February 1928, and the increase of Rs. 300 in his stipend, granted to him in 1920, ceased in December 1929.

In 1920 the Imamic troops invaded the Quteibi country. The Quteibi Shaikh, with the help of other Radfan tribes and assistance in arms and ammunition from the Aden Residency, drove them out. The Zeidi made repeated attempts to take the Quteibi country, but invariably met with strong resistance from the Radfan tribes. After about two years of successful resistance, however, the Quteibi Shaikh yielded to Zeidi pressure and went over to them in 1922 and his stipend was stopped.

In November 1927 the Quteibi Shaikh Muhammad Salih al Akhram died and was succeeded by his grandson Shaikh Hasan Ali, who repudiated his predecessor’s submission to the Imam: and the stipend was restored to him by the British Government.

In February 1928 a party of Zeidi, despatched under the orders of the Officer Commanding, Qataba, kidnapped the Alawi Shaikh and Muqbil Abdulla, uncle of the Quteibi Shaikh. They were subsequently released as a result of air action taken by His Majesty’s Government against the Imam.

The air action had so shaken the morale of the Zeidi that a combination of the Radfan tribes, with the co-operation of the Royal Air Force and a contingent of Abdali troops, was able in July 1928 to drive them out of the Radfan areas, as also from Dhala and Shaib. The Amir of Dhala was immediately reinstated in his capital and the Zeidi have made no attempt to recapture these places.

In 1931, the tribesmen of the Amir numbered about 50,000, and the gross revenue was estimated at Rs. 35,000 a year.

The Emirate was a founding member of the Federation of Arab Emirates of the South in 1959, and the Federation of South Arabia in 1963.

The Radfan Hills, nominally under control of the Amiris of Dhala, were the scene of fierce fighting between British forces and the local Qutaibis during the Aden Emergency in the mid-1960s.

The last emir, Shafaul ibn Ali Shaif Al Amiri, was deposed and the state was abolished in 1967 upon the founding of the People's Republic of South Yemen.

The area is part of the Republic of Yemen since 1990.

=== Rulers ===
The rulers of Dhala bore the title Amir Dali`.

==== Emirs ====
- .... - .... Shafa`ul al-`Amiri
- .... - .... Ahmad ibn Shafa`ul al-`Amiri
- .... - .... al-Hasan ibn Ahmad al-`Amiri
- .... - .... `Abd al-Hadi ibn al-Hasan al-`Amiri
- 1839? Musa`id ibn al-Hasan al-`Amiri
- .... - Jan 1872 Shafa`ul ibn `Abd al-Hadi al-`Amiri
- Apr 1872 - 1873 `Ali ibn Muqbil al-`Amiri (1st time)
- 1873 - Dec 1873 Muhammad ibn Musa`id al-`Amiri
- Jan 1874 - Apr 1874 `Ali ibn Muqbil al-`Amiri (2nd time)
- Apr 1874 - Mar 1878 `Abd Allah ibn Muhammad al-`Amiri
- Mar 1878 - 10 Sep 1886 `Ali ibn Muqbil al-`Amiri (2nd time)
- Sep 1886 - 22 Dec 1911 Sha´if ibn Sayf al-`Amiri
- Dec 1911 - 1920 Nasir ibn Sha'if al-`Amiri (1st time)
- 1920 - 1928 Haydara ibn Nasir al-`Amiri
- Jul 1928 - 1947 Nasir ibn Sha'if al-`Amiri (2nd time)
- 1947 - 1954 `Ali ibn `Ali al-`Amiri
- 1954 - 17 Aug 1967 Shafa`ul ibn `Ali al-`Amiri

== See also ==
- Qutaibi, a dependence of Dhala
- Radfan
- Aden Protectorate
