= Shaib =

Former Sheikhdom, now part of Yemen

Coordinates: 13°41′N 44°43′E

Sheikhdom of Shaib مشيخة الشعيب
- State of the Federation of South Arabia
- 18th century–1967
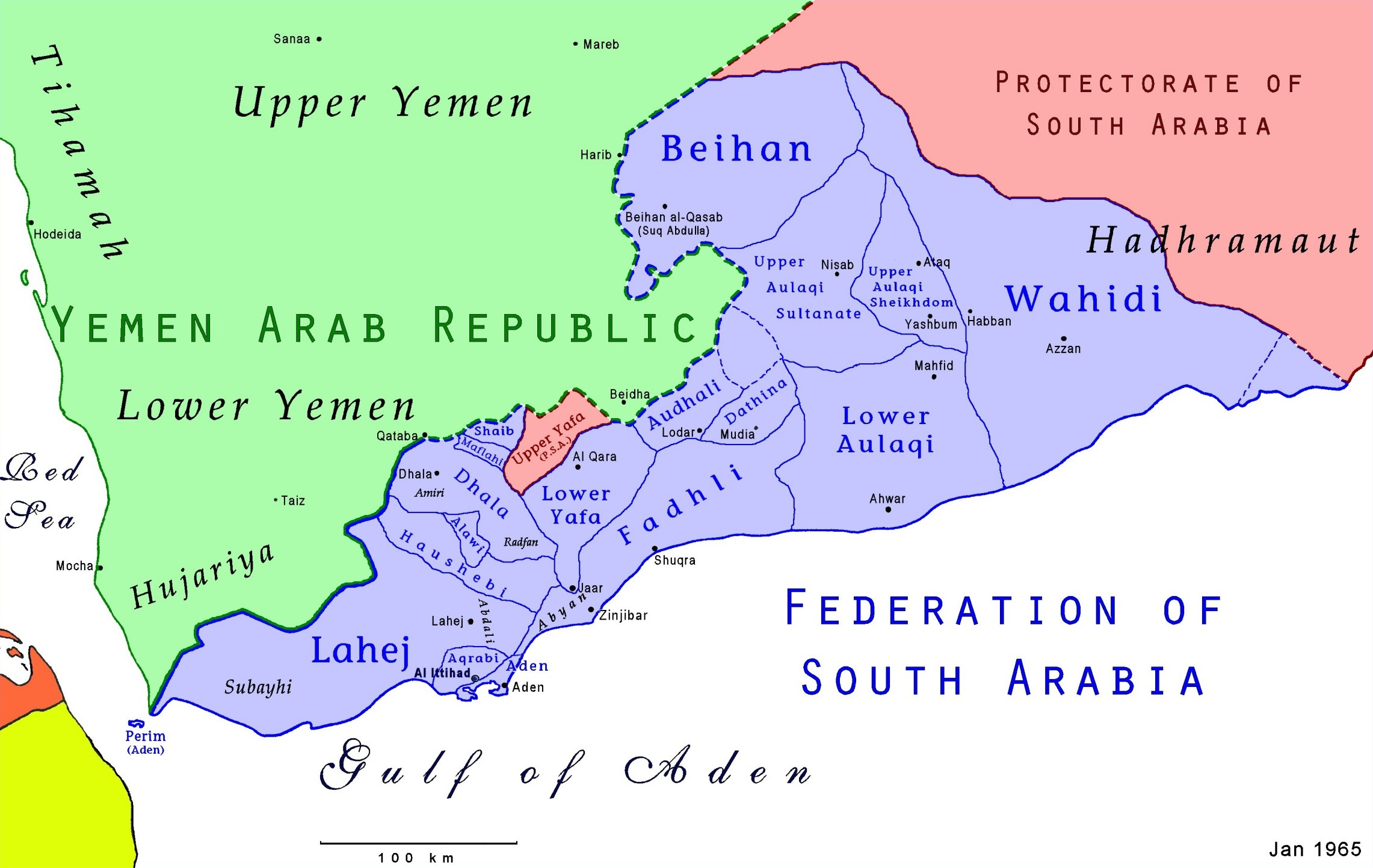
- Map of the Federation of South Arabia
  - Type: Sheikhdom
- Historical era: 20th century
  - Established: 18th century
  - Disestablished: 1967
Preceded by	Succeeded by
Federation of Arab Emirates of the South	South Yemen

Shaib or Sha‘ib (Arabic: شعيب Shu‘ayb), or the Sheikhdom of Shaib (Arabic: مشيخة الشعيب Mashyakhat ash-Shu‘ayb), was a state in the Aden Protectorate, South Arabia. The area is now part of the Republic of Yemen.

== History ==
The Sha`ib Sheikhdom was established at an uncertain date in the 18th century. After becoming a British protectorate, it eventually joined the Federation of Arab Emirates of the South as well as its successor, the Federation of South Arabia. Its last sheikh, Yahya Mohamed Al-Kholaqi Al-Saqladi, was exiled in 1967 upon the founding of the People's Republic of South Yemen. He died in Jeddah, Saudi Arabia in July 2001.

=== Rulers ===
The rulers of the Sha`ib Sheikhdom had the title of Shaykh Sha`ib.

==== Sheikhs ====
- c.1850 - 1880 Mani` al-Saqladi
- 1880 - 1915 `Ali ibn Mani` al-Saqladi
- 1915 - 1935 Mutahhar ibn Mani` al-Saqladi
- 1935 - 1948 Muhammad ibn Muqbil al-Saqladi
- Aug 1948 - 1954 Kassem ibn Mused ibn Ali al-Saqladi
- 1955 - 30 Mar 1963 Yahya ibn Muhammad al-Saqladi
- 1963 - 7 Jul 1965 Nashir ibn `Abd Allah al-Saqladi (d. 1965)
- 10 Jul 1965 - Jun 1967 Yahya ibn Mohamed Al Kholaqi al-Saqladi

== See also ==
- Aden Protectorate
