= Juban (Upper Yafa) =

Juban was a sheikhdom and dependency of Upper Yafa. It was a section of the Mawsata.

== History ==
Juban became a dependency of Upper Yafa in 1833. In the 1900s, Juban sought a protectorate treaty with Britain, which was declined. In an agreement with the Ottoman Empire in 1914, Britain recognized Juban as Ottoman territory. Zaidi troops fighting for the Ottoman Empire occupied Juban in May 1916, but the sheikh retreated and remained in command of a group of fighters, resisting the Ottomans elsewhere. In February 1917, The Sheikh of Juban occupied an Ottoman village. By 31 March 1919, Juban was occupied by the Kingdom of Yemen.

== Government ==
Juban was a sheikhdom, having 3 different sheikhs as of 1909. 'Ali Abdul Karim was the chief sheikh at the time. He was described as a "fierce hater of the Turks". He sought to come under British protection as he feared for the extinction of Juban's independence.

== Foreign relations ==
For a long time, there was close commerce between Juban, Na'wah and Upper Yafa.

== Demographics ==
As of 1915, Juban had 4000 inhabitants, divided over 8 subsections.
