= Haushabi =

Hawshabi Sultanate of Musaymir سلطنة الحواشب
- State of the Federation of South Arabia
- 18th century–1967
- Flag

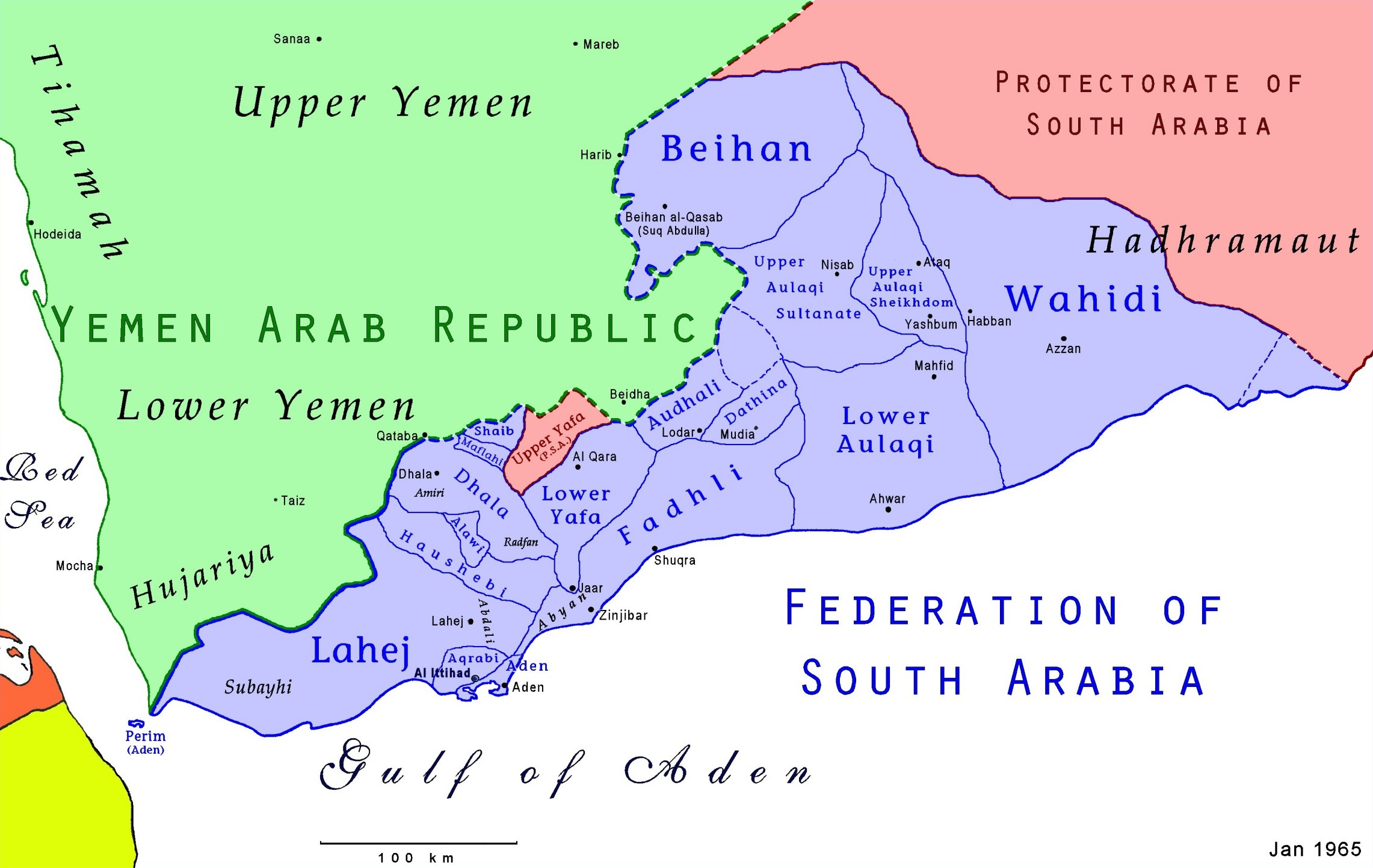
- Map of the Federation of South Arabia
- Capital: Al Raha (until 1887); Musaymir (from 1887)
  - Type: Sultanate
- Historical era: 20th century
  - Established: 18th century
  - Disestablished: 1967
Succeeded by
South Yemen

Haushabi or Hawshabi (Arabic: الحوشبي al-Ḥawshabī or Arabic: الحواشب al-Ḥawāshab), or the Haushabi Sultanate (Arabic: سلطنة الحواشب Salṭanat al-Ḥawāshab), was a state in the British Aden Protectorate. Its capital was Musaymir. The area is now part of the Republic of Yemen.

== History ==
Haushabi was established in the eighteenth century.

On 14 June 1839 an engagement was entered into with Sultan Mana bin Salam of this tribe, of the same tenor as those with the Abdali, the Fadhli and the Yafai. In the previous January a treaty of friendship and peace had been signed by two other Shaikhs of the Haushabi tribe with the British representative.

Sultan Mana bin Salam, though more than once invited by the Abdali and Fadhli Shaikhs to join them in their attacks upon Aden, steadily declined their overtures. He died in June 1858, and was succeeded by his nephew, Ubeid bin Yahya, during whose rule friendly relations were uninterruptedly maintained with the Haushabi. Ubeid bin Yahya died in 1863, and was succeeded by his cousin, Ali bin Mana. The relations of Sultan Ali bin Mana with the neighbouring Chiefs and the British Government were for a long time the reverse of cordial. In 1868 he cut off the supply of water from a rivulet which irrigates the Lahej territory, and destroyed the crops on lands belonging to the Sultan of Lahej. An action ensued in which the Haushabi Sultan was defeated. In payment of the loss suffered by the Sultan of Lahej, Sultan Ali bin Mana ceded to him the town of Zaida and its lands which had formerly belonged to Lahej, and the dispute was temporarily settled by the friendly intervention of the Resident. In October 1869 the Haushabi Sultan's stipend was stopped in consequence of the outrages committed by him on the Aden road; the proximate cause of this misconduct was the tenure of Zaida by the Sultan of Lahej, who was therefore induced to make over to his rival a small portion of that district. The Haushabi Sultan was not satisfied, and in 1873 commenced intrigues with the Turkish authorities at Taiz in the hope of thereby regaining possession of Zaida.

Supported by Turkish troops he held for some little time a part of Zaida, but on their withdrawal from the neighbourhood of Lahej he was compelled to retire.

The Sultan of Lahej was induced by the Resident to renew his offer of a portion of Zaida to the Hausliabi Sultan; but, as the latter insisted on receiving the fort of Shakaa, which commands the rivulet and consequently the supply of water to Lahej, the negotiations failed for the time. They were, however, renewed with success in 1881, when, as recorded in the account of the Abdali, an Agreement was signed by both Sultans. In 1886 this agreement was modified by the action of the Haushabi Sultan in selling his lands at Zaida to the Abdali.

Sultan Ali bin Mana died in May 1886, and was succeeded by his son, Muhsin bin Ali.

On 15 November 1888, the Sultan signed an Agreement in conjunction with the Alawi and Quteibi Shaikhs and the Amu of Dhala, fixing the rates to he levied on merchandise.

In 1894, owing to the heavy taxes laid on qafilahs by Sultan Muhsin bin Ali, the Abdali entered bis country and he was obliged to flee. He was repudiated by his Shaikhs and at their request the Abdali Sultan was elected in his place. Muhsin bin Ali, having failed in his intrigues with the Turks, submitted to the Abdali Sultan and accepted an asylum at Ar Raha with a stipend. On 6 August 1895 he signed an Agreement by which his territory was restored to him under certain guarantees. On the same date a Protectorate Treaty was concluded with him.

In 1900 Muhammad bin Nasir Muqbil, a Shaikh of the Humar tribe, and a Turkish Mudir, built a fort in Haushabi limits which the Turks garrisoned. The Turkish authorities were requested to evacuate it but refused, and the Haushabi Sultan was given permission to drive them out. The attempt, however, failed, and in July 1901 a force of 500 men was despatched from Aden. The Turks and Muhammad bin Nasir Muqbil's adherents were driven from their position at Ad Dareija on 26 July and the expedition returned to Aden.

In 1902 several fights took place with the Abdali and the trade routes were stopped for a time.

In 1903 the boundary commission demarcated the Haushabi frontier.

On 28 September 1904 Sultan Muhsin bin Ali died. He was succeeded by Sultan Ali Mana.

Subsequent to the election of Sultan Ali Mana, the question of his relations with the Abdali Sultan had been under the consideration of Government. The decision was that, with the consent of both the Sultans, the relations agreed upon by their predecessors in 1895 should continue.

From 1905 the Abdali-Haushabi relations were revived in accordance with the arrangements made between their predecessors in 1895, and became satisfactory.

Throughout 1906 the Haushabi Sultan was harassed by his Subeihi neighbours and an Abdali-Haushabi combination was formed against these marauders, resulting in the Haushabi imprisoning the leaders of the Jabbara section at Museimir. The Abdali assistance was, however, purely nominal.

Certain Abdali working in the vicinity of the British post at Nobat Dukeim were attacked by Subeihi of the Jabbara section. The motive was to retaliate on the Abdali Sultan who had refused them presents at Lahej. The Subeilii retired after exchanging a few shots.

In 1914 the Haushabi Sultan Ali Mana signed an Agreement for the safety of the trade routes in his territory. Under the terms of their agreement the Haushabi Sultan was granted a monthly payment of 64 dollars in addition to his stipend and agreed to keep a force of 50 men and to maintain posts in certain named places on the trade route.

In July 1915 the Haushabi Sultan joined in the Turkish attack on Lahej, but came to Aden at the beginning of 1919 to ask for pardon. He explained that he did not go over to the Turks voluntarily, but was compelled by them to join their forces. This explanation was accepted, he was granted an amnesty and his stipend, which had been stopped during the war, was restored to him.

In January 1922 the troops of the Imam of Sanaa encroached on Haushabi territory as far as Ad Dareija and only withdrew under pressure of air action.

In August 1922 Sultan AH Maim died and was succeeded by his son, Muhsin bin Ali Mana.

In 1931, the Haushabi numbered at about 15,000. The Sultan's gross annual revenue was estimated at Rs. 30,000.

The last sultan, Faisal bin Surur Al Haushabi, was deposed and his state was abolished in 1967 upon the founding of the People's Republic of South Yemen.

=== Rulers ===
The rulers of Haushabi bore the title Sultan al-Saltana al-Hawshabiyya.

==== Sultans ====
- c.1730 al-Fajjar al-Hawshabi
- c.1800 Sultan al-Hawshabi
- 1839? - 1 Jun 1858 Mani` ibn Sallam al-Hawshabi
- 1858 - 1863 `Ubayd ibn Yahya al-Hawshabi
- 1863 - 4 May 1886 `Ali ibn Mani` (I)al-Hawshabi
- 1886 - 1894 Muhsin ibn `Ali (I) al-Hawshabi (1st time)
- 1894 - 1895 al-Fadl ibn `Ali (usurper)
- 6 Mar 1895 – 28 Sep 1904 Muhsin ibn `Ali (I) al-Hawshabi (2nd time)
- 1904 - Aug 1922 `Ali ibn Mani` (II) al-Hawshabi
- 1922 - 19.. Muhsin ibn `Ali (II) al-Hawshabi
- 19.. - 19.. as-Surur ibn Muhammad al-Hawshabi
- 1947? - 1955 Muhammad ibn as-Surur al-Hawshabi (d. 1955)
- 1955 - 29 Nov 1967 Faysal ibn as-Surur al-Hawshabi

== See also ==
- Aden Protectorate
