= List of dynasties =

This is a list of monarchical dynasties and dynastic regimes organized by geographic region. Extant dynasties are rendered in bold and highlighted.

== General information ==
=== Criteria for inclusion ===
This list includes defunct and extant monarchical dynasties of sovereign and non-sovereign statuses at the national and subnational levels. Monarchical polities each ruled by a single family—that is, a dynasty, although not explicitly styled as such, like the Golden Horde and the Qara Qoyunlu—are included. Dynasties had/have assumed power in various types of monarchical entities, from loose hereditary tribal units to multinational dynastic empires.

While most dynasties were/are reckoned through the male line, the relatively uncommon cases of dynasties formed through matrilineal succession, such as the Rain Queen (Modjadji) dynasty, are also listed.

Although thrones could theoretically be rotated among several families in elective monarchies, some entities consistently elected/elect their rulers from the same family, effectively functioning as hereditary monarchies controlled by dynasties. For example, the Holy Roman Empire was de jure an elective monarchy, but came under the de facto hereditary rule of the House of Habsburg from AD 1440 to AD 1740, and is therefore listed as such in the "Germany" section.

This list also includes monarchical regimes whose ruling houses became extinct or were removed from power after having produced only one monarch, but would otherwise have been dynastic in their throne successions. For instance, whereas the Thonburi kingdom had only one ruler, it would likely have produced a series of monarchs from the same ruling clan had the throne not been usurped by the Chakri dynasty; the Thonburi kingdom is thus included under the "Thailand (Siam)" section.

Where possible, descendants of overthrown dynasties and pretenders are also listed. For instance, the House of Plantagenet laid claim to the throne of the Kingdom of Sicily between AD 1254 and AD 1263, and is thus listed under the "Italy" section. Likewise, the Osmanoğlu family is descended from the Ottoman dynasty, and is therefore included in the "Anatolia (Asia Minor)" section.

Entries in each section are sorted by the start year and end year of their rule, irrespective of the exact dates. Dynasties with unverifiable or disputed periods of rule are listed after those with reign periods that are generally agreed upon by scholars. In cases wherein several dynasties are typically grouped together in conventional historiography, such as the Northern and Southern dynasties of China, they are listed as such for ease of reference.

Houses of nobility with no territorial holdings (and thus were/are not monarchical dynasties in their own right), like the House of Sayn-Wittgenstein-Ludwigsburg and the House of Jocelyn; dynasties of micronations, like the Bertoleoni dynasty; dynasties of religious sects, like the Nusaybah family and the Slonim dynasty; political families, like the Roosevelt family and the Chiang family; family dictatorships, like the Mount Paektu bloodline and the Duvalier dynasty; and dynastic military regimes, like the Choe clan and the Ashikaga shogunate, are not included.

=== Nomenclature ===
A dynasty may be known by more than one name, either due to differences between its official and historiographical denominations, and/or due to the existence of multiple official and/or historiographical names. For example, the Amorian dynasty is also referred to as the "Phrygian dynasty".

Due to variations in romanization, the name of a dynasty may be rendered differently depending on the source. For instance, the Qing dynasty is also written as "Ch῾ing dynasty" using the Wade–Giles romanization.

In layman and academic parlance, the name of a dynasty is often affixed before the common name of a state in reference to a state under the rule of a particular dynasty. For example, whereas the official name of the realm ruled by the Qajar dynasty was the "Sublime State of Iran", the domain is commonly known as "Qajar Iran".

=== Period of rule ===
The year of establishment and/or the year of collapse of a dynasty may be unknown or remain contentious among scholars. In the latter cases, only an approximate time frame will be given. For example, the Deva dynasty is believed to have ruled during the 12th and 13th centuries AD, but the exact dates are disputed.

The year of establishment and/or the year of collapse of a dynasty could differ from its period of rule over a particular realm and/or geographic region. In such cases, the year(s) provided indicate the period during which a dynasty was/is in power in a particular realm and/or geographic region. For instance, whereas the House of Savoy was founded in AD 1003 in the County of Savoy and maintained its rule until AD 1946 in the Kingdom of Italy, it briefly held the throne of Spain from AD 1870 to AD 1873, and is thus reflected as such in the "Spain" section.

=== Location of rule ===
This list is sorted by the territorial extent of dynasties. Listing a particular dynasty under a specific section need not necessarily denote affiliation—political, ethnic, religious, cultural, or otherwise—between the historical dynasty and the contemporary polity/polities existing in the same region. As the succession of states and the identities of the rulers, elites, and subjects or citizens are complex and contentious issues, the classification of dynasties may be multidimensional. For example, the Ayyubid dynasty has been variously described as "Egyptian" and "Syrian" based on its geographic location and the titles held by its monarchs; "Kurdish" according to its rulers' ethnicity; "Arabized" according to its cultural identity; and "Muslim", "Islamic", and "Sunni" based on its religious faith.

Some dynasties appear more than once in this list, because:

- more than one realm was/is ruled by a single dynasty; or
- a single dynastic realm spanned/spans across more than one geographic region.

For example, apart from previously ruling over the possessions of the British Empire and numerous sovereign states that later abolished the monarchy, the House of Windsor remains the ruling dynasty of 15 sovereign states and their associated territories, and is therefore included in multiple sections. Likewise, although the Tang dynasty existed as a single realm, it had at various points in time ruled over China proper, Dzungaria, the Tarim Basin, the Mongolian Plateau, Inner Manchuria, Outer Manchuria, as well as parts of Central Asia, the Korean Peninsula, Vietnam, Siberia, and Afghanistan, and is thus listed under multiple sections.

Regions with long lines of "local" dynasties—including dynasties of indigenous and non-indigenous (but had/have assumed "local" characteristics) provenances—that experienced partial or full colonization in the modern era are given separate lists for clarity. For instance, the "Indian Subcontinent (South Asia)" section includes a main list containing "local" South Asian dynasties, such as the indigenous Chola dynasty and the non-indigenous Mughal dynasty, and a subsection listing the decidedly "foreign" dynasties of colonial entities, like the House of Bourbon of French India.

== Extant dynasties ==
Absolute monarchy Constitutional monarchy (Commonwealth realm) Constitutional monarchy (non-Commonwealth realm) Semi-constitutional monarchy Subnational (non-sovereign) monarchy

=== List of extant dynasties ruling sovereign monarchies ===
At present, there are 44 sovereign realms—including 43 sovereign states (and their associated territories) and one sovereign entity in international law without territorial possession—ruled by monarchs, of which 41 are under dynastic control. (Note: Existing sovereign entities ruled by non-dynastic monarchs are: Principality of Andorra; Holy See (ruling the Vatican City State); Sovereign Military Hospitaller Order of Saint John of Jerusalem, of Rhodes and of Malta) There are currently 26 sovereign dynasties, two of which rule more than one sovereign realm.

Dynasty	Realm	Reigning monarch	Dynastic founder (Note: The founder of a dynasty need not necessarily equate to the first monarch of a particular realm. For example, while William I was the dynastic founder of the House of Orange-Nassau which currently rules over the Kingdom of the Netherlands, he was never a monarch of the Kingdom of the Netherlands.)	Dynastic place of origin (Note: Not to be confused with dynastic seat.)
House of Windsor (Note: A sovereign state with Charles III as its monarch and head of state is known as a Commonwealth realm.)	Antigua and Barbuda	King Charles III	King-Emperor George V (Note: In AD 1917, the dynasty was renamed from the House of Saxe-Coburg and Gotha to the House of Windsor by George V.)	Thuringia and Bavaria (in modern-day Germany)
House of Windsor	Commonwealth of Australia (Note: Including: Australian Antarctic Territory; Coral Sea Islands Territory; Territory of Ashmore and Cartier Islands; Territory of Christmas Island; Territory of Cocos (Keeling) Islands; Territory of Heard Island and McDonald Islands; Territory of Norfolk Island)	King Charles III	King-Emperor George V	Thuringia and Bavaria (in modern-day Germany)
House of Windsor	Commonwealth of The Bahamas	King Charles III	King-Emperor George V	Thuringia and Bavaria (in modern-day Germany)
House of Windsor	Belize	King Charles III	King-Emperor George V	Thuringia and Bavaria (in modern-day Germany)
House of Windsor	Canada	King Charles III	King-Emperor George V	Thuringia and Bavaria (in modern-day Germany)
House of Windsor	Grenada	King Charles III	King-Emperor George V	Thuringia and Bavaria (in modern-day Germany)
House of Windsor	Jamaica	King Charles III	King-Emperor George V	Thuringia and Bavaria (in modern-day Germany)
House of Windsor	New Zealand (Note: The Realm of New Zealand consists of: Cook Islands; New Zealand; Niue; Ross Dependency; Tokelau)	King Charles III	King-Emperor George V	Thuringia and Bavaria (in modern-day Germany)
House of Windsor	Independent State of Papua New Guinea	King Charles III	King-Emperor George V	Thuringia and Bavaria (in modern-day Germany)
House of Windsor	Federation of Saint Christopher and Nevis	King Charles III	King-Emperor George V	Thuringia and Bavaria (in modern-day Germany)
House of Windsor	Saint Lucia	King Charles III	King-Emperor George V	Thuringia and Bavaria (in modern-day Germany)
House of Windsor	Saint Vincent and the Grenadines	King Charles III	King-Emperor George V	Thuringia and Bavaria (in modern-day Germany)
House of Windsor	Solomon Islands	King Charles III	King-Emperor George V	Thuringia and Bavaria (in modern-day Germany)
House of Windsor	Tuvalu	King Charles III	King-Emperor George V	Thuringia and Bavaria (in modern-day Germany)
House of Windsor	United Kingdom of Great Britain and Northern Ireland (Note: Including: Anguilla; Bermuda; British Antarctic Territory; British Indian Ocean Territory; Cayman Islands; Falkland Islands; Gibraltar; Montserrat; Pitcairn, Henderson, Ducie and Oeno Islands; Saint Helena, Ascension and Tristan da Cunha; Ascension; Saint Helena; Tristan da Cunha; South Georgia and the South Sandwich Islands; Sovereign Base Areas of Akrotiri and Dhekelia; Turks and Caicos Islands; Virgin Islands; In addition, the British government is responsible for the following Crown Dependencies, but they are neither part of the United Kingdom of Great Britain and Northern Ireland nor are they British Overseas Territories: Bailiwick of Guernsey; Isle of Man; Bailiwick of Jersey)	King Charles III	King-Emperor George V	Thuringia and Bavaria (in modern-day Germany)
House of Khalifa	Kingdom of Bahrain	King Hamad bin Isa Al Khalifa	Sheikh Khalifa bin Mohammed	Najd (in modern-day Saudi Arabia)
House of Belgium	Kingdom of Belgium	King Philippe	King Albert I (Note: In AD 1920, the dynasty was renamed from the House of Saxe-Coburg and Gotha to the House of Belgium by Albert I.)	Thuringia and Bavaria (in modern-day Germany)
Wangchuck dynasty	Kingdom of Bhutan	Druk Gyalpo Jigme Khesar Namgyel Wangchuck	Druk Gyalpo Ugyen Wangchuck	Modern-day Bhutan
House of Bolkiah	Brunei Darussalam	Sultan Hassanal Bolkiah	Sultan Muhammad Shah	Tarim (Note: The dynasty's origin in Tarim is claimed by the royal family, but the historicity is dubious.) (in modern-day Yemen)
House of Norodom	Kingdom of Cambodia	King Norodom Sihamoni	King Norodom Prohmbarirak	Modern-day Cambodia
House of Schleswig-Holstein-Sonderburg-Glücksburg	Kingdom of Denmark (Note: The Danish Realm consists of: Denmark; Faroe Islands; Greenland)	King Frederik X	Duke Friedrich Wilhelm	Glücksburg (in modern-day Germany)
House of Schleswig-Holstein-Sonderburg-Glücksburg	Kingdom of Norway (Note: Including: Bouvet Island; Jan Mayen; Peter I Island; Queen Maud Land; Svalbard)	King Harald V	Duke Friedrich Wilhelm	Glücksburg (in modern-day Germany)
House of Dlamini	Kingdom of Eswatini	King Mswati III	Chief Dlamini I	East Africa
Imperial House of Japan	Japan	Emperor Naruhito	Emperor Jimmu (Note: The Emperor Jimmu was the legendary founder of the Imperial House of Japan, known as Kōshitsu (皇室) in Japanese, but his historicity remains unverifiable. The earliest widely accepted ruler from the dynasty was the Emperor Ankō. According to official narrative, the Imperial House of Japan is the world's oldest continuous dynasty, having produced an unbroken succession of Japanese monarchs since the legendary founding year of 660 BC.)	Nara (in modern-day Japan)
House of Hashim	Hashemite Kingdom of Jordan	King Abdullah II	King Hussein ibn Ali al-Hashimi	Hejaz (in modern-day Saudi Arabia)
House of Sabah	State of Kuwait	Emir Mishal Al-Ahmad Al-Jaber Al-Sabah	Sheikh Sabah I bin Jaber	Najd (in modern-day Saudi Arabia)
House of Moshesh	Kingdom of Lesotho	King Letsie III	Paramount Chief Moshoeshoe I	Modern-day Lesotho
House of Liechtenstein	Principality of Liechtenstein	Prince Hans-Adam II	Prince Karl I	Lower Austria (in modern-day Austria)
House of Luxembourg-Nassau	Grand Duchy of Luxembourg	Grand Duke Henri	Grand Duke Adolphe	Nassau (in modern-day Germany)
House of Temenggong (Note: The House of Temenggong is the ruling dynasty of Johor Darul Ta'zim. The Sultan of Johor is the reigning Yang di-Pertuan Agong of Malaysia.)	Malaysia (Note: The throne of Malaysia rotates among the nine constituent monarchies of Malaysia, each ruled by a dynasty. The Yang di-Pertuan Agong is elected by the Conference of Rulers.)	Yang di-Pertuan Agong Ibrahim	Sultan Abu Bakar	Johor (in modern-day Malaysia)
House of Grimaldi	Principality of Monaco	Prince Albert II	François Grimaldi	Genoa (in modern-day Italy)
Alaouite dynasty	Kingdom of Morocco	King Mohammed VI	Sultan Abul Amlak Sidi Muhammad as-Sharif ibn 'Ali	Tafilalt (in modern-day Morocco)
House of Orange-Nassau	Kingdom of the Netherlands (Note: The Kingdom of the Netherlands consists of: Country of Aruba; Country of Curaçao; Netherlands; Sint Maarten)	King Willem-Alexander	Prince William I	Nassau (in modern-day Germany)
House of Busaid	Sultanate of Oman	Sultan Haitham bin Tariq	Sultan Ahmad bin Said al-Busaidi	Modern-day Yemen
House of Thani	State of Qatar	Emir Tamim bin Hamad Al Thani	Sheikh Thani bin Mohammed	Najd (in modern-day Saudi Arabia)
House of Saud	Kingdom of Saudi Arabia	King Salman bin Abdulaziz Al Saud	Emir Saud I	Diriyah (in modern-day Saudi Arabia)
House of Bourbon-Anjou	Kingdom of Spain	King Felipe VI	King Philip V	Bourbon-l'Archambault (in modern-day France)
House of Bernadotte	Kingdom of Sweden	King Carl XVI Gustaf	King Charles XIV John	Pau (in modern-day France)
Chakri dynasty	Kingdom of Thailand	King Rama X	King Rama I	Phra Nakhon Si Ayutthaya (in modern-day Thailand)
House of Tupou	Kingdom of Tonga	King Tupou VI	King George Tupou I	Modern-day Tonga
House of Nahyan (Note: The House of Nahyan is the ruling dynasty of the Emirate of Abu Dhabi. The Emir of Abu Dhabi is the incumbent President of the United Arab Emirates.)	United Arab Emirates (Note: The President of the United Arab Emirates is elected by the Federal Supreme Council. The office has been held by the Emir of Abu Dhabi since the formation of the United Arab Emirates in AD 1971.)	President Mohamed bin Zayed Al Nahyan	Sheikh Dhiyab bin Isa Al Nahyan	Liwa Oasis (in modern-day United Arab Emirates)

=== List of sovereign states and territories with extant non-sovereign dynasties ===
The following is a list of sovereign states and territories with existing dynasties ruling non-sovereign polities. Such dynasties usually possess and exercise authority over subnational divisions or people groups.

Non-sovereign dynasties may be conferred official status through constitutional arrangement or government recognition, like the dynasties ruling the Republic of Botswana's subnational chiefdoms. Alternatively, non-sovereign dynasties may exist without official recognition, as in the case of the Te Wherowhero dynasty of the Māori King Movement in New Zealand.

Non-sovereign dynasties could have once held sovereign power (and vice versa). For example, as the Emirate of Umm Al Quwain was formerly an independent shiekdom but is now a constituent emirate of the United Arab Emirates, the currently non-sovereign House of Mualla therefore held sovereign power historically.

Dynasties could simultaneously reign in both sovereign and non-sovereign polities, as is the case of the House of Temenggong whose reigning ruler is both the sovereign monarch of Malaysia and the non-sovereign monarch of the Malaysian state of Johor Darul Ta'zim.

Continent	Sovereign state or territory
Africa	Republic of Angola
Africa	Republic of Benin
Africa	Republic of Botswana
Africa	Burkina Faso
Africa	Republic of Cameroon
Africa	Central African Republic
Africa	Republic of Chad
Africa	Democratic Republic of the Congo
Africa	Republic of Côte d'Ivoire
Africa	Republic of Equatorial Guinea
Africa	Federal Democratic Republic of Ethiopia
Africa	Gabonese Republic
Africa	Republic of The Gambia
Africa	Republic of Ghana
Africa	Republic of Guinea-Bissau
Africa	Republic of Kenya
Africa	Republic of Liberia
Africa	Republic of Madagascar
Africa	Republic of Malawi
Africa	Islamic Republic of Mauritania
Africa	Republic of Namibia
Africa	Republic of the Niger
Africa	Federal Republic of Nigeria
Africa	Republic of Rwanda
Africa	Republic of Senegal
Africa	Republic of Sierra Leone
Africa	Federal Republic of Somalia
Africa	Republic of Somaliland
Africa	Republic of South Africa
Africa	Republic of South Sudan
Africa	Republic of the Sudan
Africa	United Republic of Tanzania
Africa	Togolese Republic
Africa	Republic of Uganda
Africa	Republic of Zambia
Africa	Republic of Zimbabwe
Asia	People's Republic of Bangladesh
Asia	Republic of India
Asia	Republic of Indonesia
Asia	Malaysia
Asia	Republic of the Philippines
Asia	Democratic Republic of Timor-Leste
Asia	United Arab Emirates
Europe	Bailiwick of Guernsey
Europe	Montenegro (Note: Since AD 2011, Montenegro has officially recognized the limited non-political role of the Petrović-Njegoš dynasty in cultural promotion. The Petrović-Njegoš dynasty was the ruling dynasty of Montenegro between AD 1696 and AD 1918.)
North America	Canada
North America	Republic of Panama
North America	United States of America
Oceania	Cook Islands
Oceania	Republic of the Marshall Islands
Oceania	Federated States of Micronesia
Oceania	New Caledonia
Oceania	New Zealand
Oceania	Republic of Palau
Oceania	Independent State of Samoa
Oceania	Tuvalu
Oceania	Territory of the Wallis and Futuna Islands
South America	Plurinational State of Bolivia

== List of dynasties in Africa ==
Legend
Extant sovereign dynasties
Extant non-sovereign dynasties

=== Algeria ===
Kings from States of the Classical Age

- Kings of Numidia (originated from the union of tribal rulers of the Masaesyli and of the Massylii)
- Kings of the Vandals and Alans
- Kings of the Moors and Romans

Monarchs from Medieval states

- Kings of the Aurès
- Kings of Altava
- Kings of Capsus
- Kings of Ouarsenis
  - Muhallabids (771–793) - vassal of the Umayyads and later of the Abbasids
- Ifranid dynasty - Emirate of Tlemcen
  - Muhallabids (771–793) - vassal of the Umayyads and later of the Abbasids
  - Aghlabid dynasty (800–909) - vassal of the Abbasids
- Rustamid dynasty (777–909) - Dynasty with Persian origin
  - Zirid dynasty (972–1148) - vassal of the Fatimids and later of the Abbasids
  - Hammadid dynasty (1014–1152)
- Sulaymanid dynasty (814–922) - vassal of the Fatimids
- Awlad Mandil
- Banu Khazrun (1001–1146)
- Banu Ghaniya
- Hafsid dynasty (1229–1574)
- Zayyanid dynasty (1236–1337, 1348–1352, 1359–1550) – Kingdom of Tlemcen

Dynasties of pre-colonial states conquered by the French

- Sultans of Kuku
- Sultans of Ait Abbas
- Banu Djellab – Sultanate of Tuggurt
- Emir of Abdelkader

=== Angola ===
Dynasties of pre-colonial states conquered by the Portuguese (incomplete)

- Kingdom of Matamba
  - Guterres dynasty
- Kingdom of Kongo
  - House of Kilukeni (AD 1390–1567)
  - House of Kwilu (AD 1568–1622, AD 1626–1636) – Kingdom of Kongo
  - House of Nsundi (AD 1622–1626) – Kingdom of Kongo
  - House of Kinlaza (AD 1665–1666, AD 1669–1716, AD 1743–1752, AD 1764–1787, AD 1842–1857, AD 1859–1891) – Kingdom of Kongo
  - House of Kimpanzu (AD 1665, AD 1666–1669, AD 1669–1670, AD 1673–1715, AD 1718–1743, AD 1752–1758, AD 1763–1764, AD 1857–1859, AD 1891–1896) – Kingdom of Kongo
- House of Água Rosada (AD 1688–1718, AD 1803–1842) – Kingdom of Kongo

=== Benin (former Dahomey) ===
- Aladaxonou dynasty (1600–1900) – Kingdom of Dahomey

=== Burkina Fasso (former Upper Volta) ===
- Severall Mossi Kingdoms

=== Burundi ===
- Kings of Burundi (1680–1966) – From 1890 to 1916, they were vassals of the House of Hohenzollern. From 1916 to 1962 they were vassals of the House of Belgium. Full independents kings from 1962 to 1966
  - House of Abaganwa
  - House of Ntwero

=== Cameroon ===
Monarchs of Pre-Colonial States conquered by the Germans

- Kings of the Kotoko
- Kings of the Mandara
- Kings of the Bamum

=== Djibouti (former French Somaliland) ===
- Walashma dynasty (1415–1556) – Djibouti under Adal and Ifat rule
- Muhammad Ali dynasty (1813–1884) – Vassals of the Ottomans

=== Central African Republic (former Ubangi-Shari) ===
- Ubangi-Shari is annexed by France – Ubangi-Shari under French rule
- Ubangi-Shari separated from the French Republic in 1960 as an independent republic.
- House of Bokassa (c. AD 1976–1979) established a monarchy – Central African Empire (Limited international recognition)

=== Chad ===
- Duguwa dynasty (c. AD 700–1086) – Kanem–Bornu Empire
- Sayfawa dynasty (c. AD 1086–1846) – Kanem–Bornu Empire
- Kenga dynasty (AD 1522–1897) – Sultanate of Bagirmi
- al-'Abbasi dynasty (AD 1501–1912) – Wadai Sultanate, from 1900 to 1912 as non-sovereign monarchs

=== Comoros ===
Pre-colonial states conquered by the French

- Sultans of Comoros - Several sultanates on the Comoros, an archipelago in the Indian Ocean, were founded after the introduction of Islam into the area in the 15th century. In the 19th century all the islands of the archipelago was conquered by the French

=== Republic of Congo ===
- Kings of Loango (AD 1550–1883)

=== Democratic Republic of the Congo ===
Dynasties of pre-colonial states conquered by the Belgians

- Kings of Luba (AD 1585–1889)
- Kings of Lunda (AD 1665–1887)
- Kings of Loango (AD 1550–1883)
- Anziku Kingdom (AD 17th century–19th century)
- Yeke Kingdom

=== Egypt ===
- Dynasty I of Egypt (c. 3100–2900 BC)
- Dynasty II of Egypt (2890–2686 BC)
- Dynasty III of Egypt (2686–2613 BC) – Old Kingdom of Egypt
- Dynasty IV of Egypt (2613–2498 BC) – Old Kingdom of Egypt
- Dynasty V of Egypt (2498–2345 BC) – Old Kingdom of Egypt
- Dynasty VI of Egypt (2345–2181 BC) – Old Kingdom of Egypt
- Dynasty VII of Egypt (c. 2181 BC) – Existence is disputed among historians
- Dynasty VIII of Egypt (2181–2160 BC)
- Dynasty IX of Egypt (2160–2130 BC)
- Dynasty X of Egypt (2130–2040 BC)
- Dynasty XI of Egypt (2130–1991 BC) – Middle Kingdom of Egypt
- Dynasty XII of Egypt (1991–1802 BC) – Middle Kingdom of Egypt
- Dynasty XIII of Egypt (1803–1649 BC)
- Dynasty XIV of Egypt (1725–1650 BC) – Dynasty with Canaanite origin
- Abydos dynasty (1650–1600 BC) – Hypothesized
- Dynasty XV of Egypt (1650–1550 BC) – Dynasty with origins in the Hyksos
- Dynasty XVI of Egypt (1649–1582 BC)
- Dynasty XVII of Egypt (1580–1550 BC)
- Dynasty XVIII of Egypt (1550–1292 BC) – New Kingdom of Egypt
- Dynasty XIX of Egypt, also known as the Ramessid dynasty (1292–1189 BC) – New Kingdom of Egypt
- Dynasty XX of Egypt (1189–1077 BC) – New Kingdom of Egypt
- Dynasty XXI of Egypt (1069–945 BC)
- Dynasty XXII of Egypt (945–720 BC) – Dynasty with Meshwesh (Ancient Libyan) origin
- Dynasty XXIII of Egypt (837–728 BC) – Dynasty with Meshwesh (Ancient Libyan) origin
- Dynasty XXIV of Egypt (732–720 BC)
- Dynasty XXV of Egypt (744–656 BC) – Dynasty with Nubian origin. Nicknamed "The Black Pharaohs"
- Dynasty XXVI of Egypt (664–525 BC)
- Dynasty XXVII of Egypt (525–404 BC) – Historiographical nomenclature denoting the rule of the Achaemenid dynasty in Egypt from Cambyses II to Darius II (Egypt under Persian rule)
- Dynasty XXVIII of Egypt (404–398 BC)
- Dynasty XXIX of Egypt (398–380 BC)
- Dynasty XXX of Egypt (380–343 BC)
- Ptolemaic dynasty or Dynasty XXXIII (Note: According to traditional chronology, the XXXI dynasty is considered to be the reign of the Persian Achaemenids, while the XXXII dynasty is considered to be the Macedonian period.) of Egypt (305–30 BC) – Ptolemaic Kingdom (Dynasty with Macedonian origin)
- Tulunid dynasty (AD 868–905) – Dynasty with Turkic origin. However, they was vassals of the Abbasids
- Ikhshidid dynasty (AD 935–969) – Dynasty with Turkic origin
- Fatimid dynasty (AD 969–1171) – Fatimid Caliphate (Dynasty with Arab origin)
- Ayyubid dynasty (AD 1171–1250) – Ayyubid Sultanate of Egypt - Dynasty with Kurdish origin
- Bahri dynasty (AD 1250–1382) – Mamluk Sultanate of Egypt - Dynasty with Turkic origin)
- Burji dynasty (AD 1382–1517) – Mamluk Sultanate of Egypt - Dynasty with Circassian origin)
- Muhammad Ali dynasty (AD 1805–1953) – Dynasty with Albanian origin. From 1805 to 1914 they was vassals of the Ottomans, from 1914 to 1922 they was vassals of the British. Full independent kings from 1922 to 1953

=== Equatorial Guinea ===
- Bahítáari Dynasty (AD ?–2001) – Bubi kings

=== Eritrea ===
- Land of Punt (2500–980 BC)
- Dahlak dynasty (AD 960–1557)

=== Eswatini (Swaziland) ===
- **House of Dlamini** (1745–present)

=== Ethiopia ===
- Dʿmt (980–400 BC)
- Solomonic dynasty (ሰለሞናዊው ሥርወ መንግሥት) (AD 100–940, AD 1270–1974) – Kingdom of Aksum and Ethiopian Empire
  - Gondarine line (AD 1606–1769)
  - Tewodros dynasty (AD 1855–1868)
  - Tigrayan line (AD 1871–1889)
  - Shewan line (AD 1889–1936, AD 1941–1975)
- Zagwe dynasty (c. AD 900–1270, AD 1868–1871) – Ethiopian Empire

Other states that existed in the territory of modern Ethiopia

- Makhzumi dynasty (AD 896–1286) - Their realm was annexed by the Sultanate of Ifat
- Walashma dynasty (AD 1285–1577) - Ruled Ifat and later Adal. Dethroned by the Imamate of Aussa
- Mudaito dynasty (AD 1734–1936) - Turned Aussa in a Sultanate, annexed by the Kingdom of Italy in 1936. After the World War II their realm was annexed by Ethiopia
- Kings of Garo (AD 1567–1883) - Conquered by the Kingdom of Jimma
- Kings of Jimna (1790–1932) - Annexed by the Ethiopian Empire
- Gideonite dynasty (?–AD 1627) – Kingdom of Semien

=== The Gambia ===
- Kings of Wuli (1235–1889) – Vassals of the British from 1816 to 1889
- Kings of Niumy (???-1897) – Annexed by the British in 1897

=== Ghana ===
- Kings of the Bono (11th century–20th century)
- Kings of Denkirya (1500–1701)
- **Oyoko Abohyen dynasty** (1670–present) – Ashanti Empire and traditional leaders of the Asante people (Non-sovereign). Vassals of the British monarchs from 1821 to 1960

=== Guinea ===
- Keita dynasty (c. 1200–1591) – Guinea under Malian rule
- Kings of Kaabu (1537–1867)
- Wassolou Faama (King) (1878–1898)
- Almamys of Futa Jallon – Conquered and annexed by the Portuguese and French

=== Guinea-Bissau ===
Pre-colonial kingdoms

- Kings of Kaabu (1537–1867)
- Kings of Guinala
- Kings of Biguba
- Kings of Bissegi

=== Ivory Coast ===
Pre-colonial states conquered by the French (incomplete)

- Kings of Gyaman (c. 1650–1895)
- Kings of the Baoulé
- Kings of Sanwi
- Faamas (Kings) of Wattara (1710–1898)
- Wassoulou Faama (King) (1878–1898)

=== Kenya ===
- Kings of the Wangas
- Kings of the Swahili city-states:
  - Sultans of Kilwa - Shirazi dynasty and Mahdali dynasty (Their capital city was in modern Tanzania)
  - Sultans of Mombasa (???-1593)
  - Kings of Malindi (???-1500)
  - Kings of Lamu

=== Lesotho ===
- **House of Moshesh** (1822–present) – Vassals of the British monarchs from 1868 to 1966. Full independent kings since 1966

=== Libya ===
- Gaetuli
- Garamantes
- Psylli
- Libu
- Meshwesh
- Zenata
- Houara
- Nasamones
- Laguatan
- Jarawa (Berber tribe)
- Muhallabids (771–793)
- Rustamid dynasty (777–909)
- Aghlabid dynasty (800–909)
- Banu Khazrun (1001–1046)
- Banu Ghaniya (1126–1203)
- Awlad Mandil (1160–1372)
- Hafsid dynasty (1229–1574)
- Banu Hilal
- Banu Sulaym
- Banu Kinana
- Banu Thabet
- Bani-Nasr dynasty
- Theocratic kingdoms of Kharijite sectarians
- Awlad Suleiman dynasty in Murzuq
- Karamanli dynasty (1711–1835)
- House of Senussi (1951–1969) – Kingdom of Libya

=== Madagascar ===
- Hova dynasty (1540–1897) – Merina Kingdom

=== Mali ===
- Keita dynasty (11th century–17th century) – Mali Empire
- Za dynasty
- Sonni dynasty (14th century–1493) – Songhai Empire
- Askiya dynasty (1493–1591) – Songhai Empire
- Coulibaly dynasty (1712–1862) – Bamana Empire
- Toucouleur Empire (1848–1893)

=== Morocco and Mauritania ===
- Gaetuli
- Garamantes
- Mauri
- Houara
- Mauretania
- Jarawa (Berber tribe)
- Emirate of Sijilmasa
- Kingdom of Nekor (710–1019)
- Barghawata (744–1058)
- Midrarid dynasty (757–976)
- Idrisid dynasty (789–974)
- Banu Isam
- Reguibat tribe
- Tajakant
- Miknasa
- Godala
- Masmuda
- Ghomaras
- Sanhaja
- Lamtuna
- Hammudid dynasty
- Taifa of Ceuta
- Almoravid dynasty (1060–1147)
- Maqil
- Beni Ḥassān
- Banu Kinanah
- Tinmel
- Almohad dynasty (1147–1258)
- Awlad Mandil
- Zenata
- Marinid dynasty (1258–1465)
- Wattasid dynasty (1472–1554)
- Kunta (tribe)
- Bled es-Siba
- Ouartajin dynasty (1430–1563) – Principality of Debdou
- Ait Yafelman
- Aït Atta
- Ait Saghrouchen
- Tekna
- Zaouia of Dila
- Saadi dynasty (1554–1659)
- Kingdom of Fez
- Kingdom of Sus
- Kingdom of Marrakesh
- Hintata
- Kingdom of Tafilalt
- **Alaouite dynasty** (1666–present)

=== Niger ===
- Sonni dynasty (14th century–1493) – Songhai Empire
- Askiya dynasty (1493–1901) – Songhai Empire (1493–1591) and Dendi Kingdom (1591–1901)

=== Nigeria ===
- Eri dynasty of the Igbo and Igala peoples
- Hausa Kingdoms
  - Banza Bakwai
  - Hausa Bakwai
- Ibn Fodio dynasty of Sokoto and Gwandu
- Jaja dynasty of Opobu
- Modibo Adama dynasty of Adamawa
- el-Kanemi dynasty of Bornu
- Ooduan dynasty of Ife, Egba, Ketu, Sabe, Oyo, Ijero and the Ilas
  - Omoremilekun Asodeboyede dynasty of Akure (a cadet branch of the Ooduan dynasty)
    - Ado dynasty of Lagos (a cadet branch of the Ooduan dynasty)
      - Eweka dynasty of Benin (a cadet branch of the Ooduan dynasty)
- Sayfawa dynasty of Bornu
- **House of Nnofo** (1498–present) – Ruling house of the Nnewi Kingdom (Non-sovereign)
- Sokoto Caliphate (1804–1903)

=== Senegal ===
- Lamanic period
  - Joof family
    - House of Boureh Gnilane Joof
    - House of Jogo Siga Joof
    - House of Semou Njekeh Joof
      - Guelowar dynasty (1350–1969)
- Joos dynasty (1367–1855)
- Denianke dynasty (1512–1776) – Empire of Great Fulo

=== Somalia ===
- Macrobia Kingdom – Legendary
- House of Garen (AD 9th century–17th century) – Sultanate of Mogadishu and Ajuran Sultanate
- Gobroon dynasty (AD 17th century–1910) – Sultanate of the Geledi
- Majeerteen Sultanate (Saldanadii Majeerteen) (c. AD 1800–1924)
- Sultanate of Hobyo (Saldanadii Hobyo) (AD 1878–1925)

=== Somaliland ===
- Macrobia Kingdom – Legendary
- Adal Sultanate (AD 9th century–13th century)
- Walashma dynasty (Boqortooyadii Walashma) (AD 1285–1577) – Sultanate of Ifat and Adal Sultanate
- Guled dynasty (AD 1750–1884) – Isaaq Sultanate
- Habr Yunis Sultanate (Saldanadii Habar Yoonis) (c. AD late 18th century-1884)

=== South Africa ===
- **Zulu royal family** – Traditional leaders of the Zulu tribe (Non-sovereign)
- **Rain Queen dynasty** – Traditional leaders of the Balobedu tribe (Non-sovereign)
- **Transkeian dynasty** – Traditional leaders of the Thembu tribe (Non-sovereign)
- **AmaNyawuza dynasty** – Traditional leaders of the Mpondo tribe (Non-sovereign)
- **Molotlegi dynasty** – Royal Bafokeng Nation (Non-sovereign)
- **Mandela family** – Mvezo (Non-sovereign)

=== Sudan ===
- Daju dynasty (12th century–15th century) – Daju Kingdom
- Tunjur dynasty (15th century–1650) – Tunjur Kingdom
- Keira dynasty (1603–1874) – Sultanate of Darfur
- Muhammad Ali dynasty (1821–1885) – Also called "Alawiyya dynasty"
- House of al-Mahdi (1845–1945)

=== Tunisia ===
- Gaetuli
- Garamantes
- Musulamii
- Zenata
- Houara
- Ancient Carthage
- Massylii
- Kingdom of Capsus
- Vandal Kingdom
- Jarawa (Berber tribe)
- Sanhaja
- Aghlabid dynasty
- Fatimid dynasty
- Muhallabids (771–793)
- Zirid dynasty (972–1148)
- Awlad Mandil
- Banu Hilal
- Banu Ghaniya
- Banu Kinanah
- Khurasanid dynasty (1059–1158)
- Kingdom of Africa
- Hafsid dynasty (1229–1574)
- Hintata
- Husainid dynasty

=== Uganda ===
- **Abalasangeye dynasty** (?–present) – Kingdom of Buganda (Non-sovereign)

=== Zimbabwe ===
- House of Changamire (1660–1889) – Rozvi Empire

== List of dynasties in Asia ==
Legend
Extant sovereign dynasties
Extant non-sovereign dynasties
Extant dynasties ruling both sovereign and non-sovereign polities

=== Afghanistan ===
- Median dynasty (678–550 BC)
- Achaemenid dynasty (550–330 BC) – Afghanistan within the Achaemenid Empire
- Seleucid dynasty (330–150 BC)
- Maurya Empire (305–180 BC)
- House of Diodotus (255–223 BC) – Greco-Bactrian Kingdom
- Arsacid dynasty (247 BC–AD 224)
- Euthydemid dynasty (230 BC–AD 10) – Greco-Bactrian Kingdom and Indo-Greek Kingdom
- House of Eucratides (170–130 BC) – Greco-Bactrian Kingdom
- House of Suren (12 BC–AD 130) – Indo-Parthian Kingdom
- Kushan Empire (AD 30–375)
- Sasanian dynasty (AD 230–651) – Afghanistan within the Sasanian Empire and Kushano-Sasanian Kingdom
- Kidarites (AD 320–465)
- Alchon Huns (AD 370–670)
- Hephthalite Empire (AD 440–710)
- Nezak Huns (AD 484–665)
- Tokhara Yabghus (AD 625–758)
- Tang dynasty (AD 657–670) – Chinese rule over parts of Afghanistan under the Protectorate General to Pacify the West
- Umayyad dynasty (AD 661–750) – Afghanistan within the Umayyad Caliphate
- Kabul Shahi (AD 665–1026)
  - Turk Shahis (AD 665–850)
  - Hindu Shahis (AD 850–1026)
- Zunbils (AD 680–870)
- Abbasid dynasty (AD 750–821) – Afghanistan within the Abbasid Caliphate
- Lawik dynasty (AD 750–977)
- Tahirid dynasty (AD 821–873)
- Saffarid dynasty (AD 863–900)
- Samanid Empire (AD 875–999)
- Ghurid dynasty (AD 879–1215)
- Farighunids (AD 9th century–1010)
- Ghaznavid dynasty (AD 977–1186)
- Seljuq dynasty (AD 1037–1194)
- Anushtegin dynasty (AD 1215–1231) – Afghanistan within the Khwarazmian Empire
- Qarlughid dynasty (AD 1224–1266)
- Chagatai Khanate (AD 1225–1370)
- Kart dynasty (AD 1244–1381)
- Ilkhanate (AD 1256–1353)
- Khalji dynasty (AD 1290–1320)
- Samma dynasty (AD 1351–1524)
- Timurid dynasty (AD 1370–1738) – Afghanistan within the Timurid Empire and Mughal Empire
- Safavid dynasty (AD 1510–1709)
- Arghun dynasty (AD 1520–1554)
- Tarkhan dynasty (AD 1554–1591)
- Katoor dynasty (AD 1570–1947)
- Hotak dynasty (AD 1709–1738)
- Afsharid dynasty (AD 1738–1747)
- Durrani dynasty (AD 1747–1826, AD 1839–1842) – Durrani Empire (AD 1747–1826) and Emirate of Afghanistan (AD 1839–1842)
- Barakzai dynasty (AD 1818–1973) – Principality of Qandahar (AD 1818–1855), Emirate of Afghanistan (AD 1823–1839, AD 1842–1926), and Kingdom of Afghanistan (AD 1926–1973)
  - Musahiban (AD 1929–1973)

=== Azerbaijan ===
- Seljuq dynasty
- Eldiguzids
- Javanshir clan (1748–1822) – Karabakh Khanate
- House of Black Monk – Shaki Khanate
- Khanates of the Caucasus

=== Bahrain ===
- Umayyad dynasty (AD 661–750)
- Abbasid Caliphate (AD 750–899)
- Uyunid dynasty (AD 1076–1253)
- Usfurids (AD 1253–1320)
- Jarwanid dynasty (AD 14th century–15th century)
- Jabrids (AD 15th century–16th century)
- House of Aviz-Beja (AD 1521–1580) – Bahrain under Portuguese rule
- **House of Khalifa** (AD 1783–present)

=== Bhutan ===
- **Wangchuck dynasty** (དབང་ཕྱུག་རྒྱལ་བརྒྱུད་) (1907–present)

=== Brunei ===
- **House of Bolkiah** (1368–present)

=== Cambodia ===
- **Varman dynasty** (រាជវង្សវរ្ម័ន) (13th century–present)
  - Mahidharapura dynasty (รរាជត្រកូលមហិធរៈបុរៈ) (1080–1336)
  - **House of Norodom** (រាជវង្សនរោត្តម) (1860–1904, 1941–1970, 1993–present)
  - House of Sisowath (រាជវង្សស៊ីសុវតិ្ថ) (1904–1941)

=== Central Asia ===
- House of Diodotus (255–223 BC) – Greco-Bactrian Kingdom
- Euthydemid dynasty (230 BC–AD 10) – Greco-Bactrian Kingdom and Indo-Greek Kingdom
- Luandi (209 BC–AD 93) – Xiongnu confederation (209 BC–AD 48) and Northern Xiongnu (AD 48–93)
- House of Eucratides (170–130 BC) – Greco-Bactrian Kingdom
- Xianbei state (c. AD 93–234)
- Sasanian dynasty (AD 224–651) – Sasanian Empire and Kushano-Sasanian Kingdom
- Afrighid dynasty (AD 305–995)
- Kidarites (AD 320–500)
- Ashina tribe (AD 552–657) – First Turkic Khaganate (AD 552–581) and Western Turkic Khaganate (AD 581–657)
- Tokhara Yabghus (AD 625–758)
- Tang dynasty (AD 640–690, AD 705–790) – Chinese rule over Central Asia under the Protectorate General to Pacify the West and various other protectorates
  - Wu Zhou (AD 690–705) – Interrupted the Tang dynasty; Chinese rule over Central Asia under the Protectorate General to Pacify the West and various other protectorates
- Ikhshids of Sogdia (AD 642–755)
- Bukhar Khudahs (AD 681–890)
- Ajo clan (AD 693–1207) – Yenisei Kyrgyz Khaganate
- Principality of Chaghaniyan (AD 7th century–8th century)
- Principality of Khuttal (AD 7th century–750)
- Principality of Farghana (AD 8th century–819)
- Karluk Yabghu State (AD 756–840)
- Oghuz Yabgu State (AD 766–1055)
- Samanid Empire (AD 819–999)
- Kara-Khanid Khanate (AD 840–1212)
  - Eastern Kara-Khanid (AD 1032–1210)
  - Western Kara-Khanid (AD 1041–1212)
- Banijurids (AD 848–908)
- Ghurid dynasty (c. AD 879–1215)
- Principality of Ushrusana (?–AD 892)
- Ghaznavid dynasty (AD 977–1186)
- Ma'munid dynasty (AD 995–1017)
- Muhtajids (AD 10th century–11th century)
- Seljuq dynasty (AD 1037–1194) – Seljuk Empire
- Anushtegin dynasty (AD 1077–1231) – Khwarazmian Empire
- Western Liao dynasty (AD 1124–1218) – Also called "Qara Khitai"
- Mongol Empire (AD 1207–1368)
  - House of Ögedei (AD 1225–1309)
  - Chagatai Khanate (AD 1225–1346)
    - Western Chagatai Khanate (AD 1346–1402)
    - Moghulistan (AD 1347–1680)
      - Yarkent Khanate (AD 1514–1705)
  - Golden Horde (AD 1242–1502)
    - Shaybanid dynasty (AD 1428–1883)
      - Manghit dynasty (AD 1785–1920) – Emirate of Bukhara
        - Nogai Horde (AD 1440s–1634)
    - Kazakh Khanate (AD 1465–1848)
      - Bukey Horde (AD 1801–1849)
    - Janid dynasty (AD 1599–1747)
  - Ilkhanate (AD 1256–1353)
- Kart dynasty (AD 1244–1381)
- Sufi dynasty (AD 1361–1379)
- Timurid dynasty (AD 1370–1507) – Timurid Empire
- Khanate of Khiva (AD 1511–1920)
- Hotak dynasty (AD 1709–1738)
- Khanate of Kokand (AD 1709–1876)
- Durrani dynasty (AD 1747–1826) – Durrani Empire
- Qing dynasty (AD 1759–1912) – Chinese rule over parts of Central Asia as far west as Lake Balkhash
- Sarybagysh dynasty (AD 1842–1854) – Kara-Kyrgyz Khanate
- House of Holstein-Gottorp-Romanov (AD 1867–1917) – Western Turkestan under Russian rule

=== Champa ===
- 1st dynasty (192–336)
- 2nd dynasty (336–420)
- 3rd dynasty (420–529)
- 4th dynasty (529–758)
- 5th dynasty (758–854)
- 6th dynasty (854–989)
- 7th dynasty (989–1044)
- 8th dynasty (1044–1074)
- 9th dynasty (1074–1139)
- 10th dynasty (1139–1145)
- 11th dynasty (1145–1190)
- 12th dynasty (1190–1318)
- 13th dynasty (1318–1390)
- 14th dynasty (1390–1458)
- 15th dynasty (1458–1471)
- Dynasty of Po Saktiraidaputih (1695–1822)

=== China (including Tibet) ===
==== Antiquity ====
- Three Sovereigns and Five Emperors (三皇五帝(ㄙㄢ ㄏㄨㄤˊ ㄨˇ ㄉㄧˋ)) (2852 (Note: According to traditional Chinese mythology, this was said to be the year that Fuxi, the creator god, became the first mythical emperor of China.)–2070 BC) – Legendary
  - Taotang clan (陶唐氏(ㄊㄠˊ ㄊㄤˊ ㄕˋ)) (?–?) – Legendary
  - Youyu clan (有虞氏(ㄧㄡˇ ㄩˊ ㄕˋ)) (?–?) – Legendary
- Pre-Qin dynastic fiefs (先秦諸侯國(ㄒㄧㄢ ㄑㄧㄣˊ ㄓㄨ ㄏㄡˊ ㄍㄨㄛˊ)) (2500–209 BC)
  - Ancient Shu (古蜀(ㄍㄨˇ ㄕㄨˇ)) (2500–316 BC)
    - Cancong dynasty (蠶叢(ㄘㄢˊ ㄘㄨㄥˊ)) (2500 BC–?)
    - Boguan dynasty (柏灌(ㄅㄛˊ ㄍㄨㄢˋ)) (?–1700 BC)
    - Yufu dynasty (魚鳧(ㄩˊ ㄈㄨˊ)) (1700–1200 BC)
    - Duyu dynasty (杜宇(ㄉㄨˋ ㄩˇ)) (1200–600 BC)
    - Kaiming dynasty (開明(ㄎㄞ ㄇㄧㄥˊ)) (600–316 BC)
  - Yue (越(ㄩㄝˋ)) (2032–222 BC) – Ruled by the House of Si (姒) of Baiyue descent
  - Mixu (密須(ㄇㄧˋ ㄒㄩ)) (21st century–10th century BC) – Ruled by the House of Ji (姞) of Huaxia descent
  - Dong (董(ㄉㄨㄥˇ)) (21st century–7th century BC) – Ruled by the House of Ji (己) of Huaxia descent
  - Predynastic Shang (先商(ㄒㄧㄢ ㄕㄤ)) (?–1675 BC) – Ruled by the House of Zi (子) of Huaxia descent
  - Guzhu (孤竹(ㄍㄨ ㄓㄨˊ)) (1600–660 BC) – Ruled by the House of Zi (子) of Huaxia descent
  - Qi (杞(ㄑㄧˇ)) (16th century–445 BC) – Ruled by the House of Si (姒) of Huaxia descent
  - Deng (鄧(ㄉㄥˋ)) (1200–678 BC) – Ruled by the House of Man (曼) of Huaxia descent
  - Xi (息(ㄒㄧ)) (1122–680 BC) – Ruled by the House of Ji (姬) of Huaxia descent
  - E (鄂(ㄝˋ)) (12th century–863 BC) – Ruled by the House of Ji (姞) of Huaxia descent
  - Quan (權(ㄑㄩㄢˊ)) (12th century–704 BC) – Ruled by the House of Zi (子) of Huaxia descent
  - Wu (吳(ㄨˊ)) (1096–473 BC) – Ruled by the House of Ji (姬) of Huaxia descent
  - Bei (邶(ㄅㄟˋ)) (?–1059 BC) – Ruled by the House of Zi (子) of Huaxia descent
  - Guan (管(ㄍㄨㄢˇ)) (1046–1039 BC) – Ruled by the House of Ji (姬) of Huaxia descent
  - Feng (酆(ㄈㄥ)) (1046–1023 BC) – Ruled by the House of Ji (姬) of Huaxia descent
  - Jiao (焦(ㄐㄧㄠ)) (1046–775 BC) – Ruled by the House of Ji (姬) of Huaxia descent
  - Zhu (祝(ㄓㄨˋ)) (1046–768 BC) – Ruled by the House of Ji (姬) of Huaxia descent
  - Eastern Guo (東虢(ㄉㄨㄥ ㄍㄨㄛˊ)) (1046–767 BC) – Ruled by the House of Ji (姬) of Huaxia descent
  - Su (宿(ㄙㄨˋ)) (1046–684 BC) – Ruled by the House of Feng (風) of Huaxia descent
  - Tan (譚(ㄊㄢˊ)) (1046–684 BC) – Ruled by the House of Si (姒) of Huaxia descent
  - Huo (霍(ㄏㄨㄛˋ)) (1046–661 BC) – Ruled by the House of Ji (姬) of Huaxia descent
  - Shu (舒(ㄕㄨ)) (1046–657 BC) – Ruled by the House of Yan (偃) of Huaxia descent
  - Yu (虞(ㄩˊ)) (1046–655 BC) – Ruled by the House of Ji (姬) of Huaxia descent
  - Western Guo (西虢(ㄒㄧ ㄍㄨㄛˊ)) (1046–655 BC) – Ruled by the House of Ji (姬) of Huaxia descent
    - Northern Guo (北虢(ㄅㄟˇ ㄍㄨㄛˊ)) (?–?)
    - Southern Guo (南虢(ㄋㄢˊ ㄍㄨㄛˊ)) (?–?)
  - Wen (溫(ㄨㄣ)) (1046–650 BC) – Ruled by the House of Ji (己) of Huaxia descent
  - Ying (英(ㄧㄥ)) (1046–646 BC) – Ruled by the House of Yan (偃) of Huaxia descent
  - Yuan (原(ㄩㄢˊ)) (1046–635 BC) – Ruled by the House of Ji (姬) of Huaxia descent
  - Lu (六(ㄌㄨˋ)) (1046–622 BC) – Ruled by the House of Yan (偃) of Huaxia descent
  - Shuliao (舒蓼(ㄕㄨ ㄌㄧㄠˇ)) (1046–601 BC) – Ruled by the House of Yan (偃) of Huaxia descent
  - Genmou (根牟(ㄍㄣ ㄇㄡˊ)) (1046–600 BC) – Ruled by the House of Jiang (姜) of Dongyi descent
  - Xun (荀(ㄒㄩㄣˊ)) (1046–7th century BC) – Ruled by the House of Ji (姬) of Huaxia descent
  - Shuyong (舒庸(ㄕㄨ ㄩㄥ)) (1046–574 BC) – Ruled by the House of Yan (偃) of Huaxia descent
  - Shujiu (舒鳩(ㄕㄨ ㄐㄧㄡ)) (1046–548 BC) – Ruled by the House of Yan (偃) of Huaxia descent
  - Mao (毛(ㄇㄠˊ)) (1046–516 BC) – Ruled by the House of Ji (姬) of Huaxia descent
  - Pan (番(ㄆㄢ)) (1046–504 BC) – Ruled by the House of Ji (己) of Huaxia descent
  - Dun (頓(ㄉㄨㄣˋ)) (1046–496 BC) – Ruled by the House of Ji (姬) of Huaxia descent
  - Cao (曹(ㄘㄠˊ)) (1046–487 BC) – Ruled by the House of Ji (姬) of Huaxia descent
  - Cai (蔡(ㄘㄞˋ)) (1046–447 BC) – Ruled by the House of Ji (姬) of Huaxia descent
  - Ju (莒(ㄐㄩˇ)) (1046–431 BC) – Ruled by the House of Ji (己) of Dongyi descent
  - Cheng (郕(ㄔㄥˊ)) (1046–408 BC) – Ruled by the House of Ji (姬) of Huaxia descent
  - Xu (許(ㄒㄩˇ)) (1046–375 BC) – Ruled by the House of Jiang (姜) of Huaxia descent
  - Ba (巴(ㄅㄚ)) (1046–316 BC) – Ruled by the House of Ji (姬) of Ba descent
  - Teng (滕(ㄊㄥˊ)) (1046–297 BC) – Ruled by the House of Ji (姬) of Huaxia descent
  - Zou (鄒(ㄗㄡ)) (1046–281 BC) – Ruled by the House of Cao (曹) of Huaxia descent
  - Yan (燕(ㄧㄢ)) (1046–222 BC) – Ruled by the House of Ji (姬) of Huaxia descent
  - Qi (齊(ㄑㄧˊ)) (1046–221 BC)
    - Jiang Qi (姜齊(ㄐㄧㄤ ㄑㄧˊ)) (1046–386 BC) – Ruled by the House of Jiang (姜) of Huaxia descent
    - Tian Qi (田齊(ㄊㄧㄢˊ ㄑㄧˊ)) (386–221 BC) – Ruled by the House of Gui (媯) of Huaxia descent
  - Predynastic Zhou (先周(ㄒㄧㄢ ㄓㄡ)) (?–1046 BC) – Ruled by the House of Ji (姬) of Huaxia descent
  - Shao (召(ㄕㄠˋ)) (1046 BC–?) – Ruled by the House of Ji (姬) of Huaxia descent
  - Bi (畢(ㄅㄧˋ)) (1046 BC–?) – Ruled by the House of Ji (姬) of Huaxia descent
  - Zhou Demesne (周邑(ㄓㄡ ㄧˋ)) (1046 BC–?) – Ruled by the House of Ji (姬) of Huaxia descent
  - Rong (榮(ㄖㄨㄥˊ)) (1046 BC–?) – Ruled by the House of Ji (姬) of Huaxia descent
  - Yong (雍(ㄩㄥ)) (1046 BC–?) – Ruled by the House of Ji (姬) of Huaxia descent
  - Rui (芮(ㄖㄨㄟˋ)) (1046 BC–?) – Ruled by the House of Ji (姬) of Huaxia descent
    - Northern Rui (北芮(ㄅㄟˇ ㄖㄨㄟˋ)) (1046–640 BC)
    - Southern Rui (南芮(ㄋㄢˊ ㄖㄨㄟˋ)) (806 BC–?)
  - Han (邗(ㄏㄢˊ)) (1046 BC–?)
  - Ji (冀(ㄐㄧˋ)) (1046 BC–?) – Ruled by the House of Qi (祁) of Huaxia descent
  - Chunyu (淳于(ㄔㄨㄣˊ ㄩˊ)) (1046 BC–?) – Ruled by the House of Jiang (姜) of Huaxia descent
  - Gao (郜(ㄍㄠˋ)) (1046 BC–?) – Ruled by the House of Ji (姬) of Huaxia descent
  - Mao (茅(ㄇㄠˊ)) (1046 BC–?) – Ruled by the House of Ji (姬) of Huaxia descent
  - Shulong (舒龍(ㄕㄨ ㄌㄨㄥˊ)) (1046 BC–?) – Ruled by the House of Yan (偃) of Huaxia descent
  - Shugong (舒龔(ㄕㄨ ㄍㄨㄥ)) (1046 BC–?) – Ruled by the House of Yan (偃) of Huaxia descent
  - Shubao (舒鮑(ㄕㄨ ㄅㄠˋ)) (1046 BC–?) – Ruled by the House of Yan (偃) of Huaxia descent
  - Wan (皖(ㄨㄢˇ)) (1046 BC–?) – Ruled by the House of Yan (偃) of Huaxia descent
  - Lu (廬(ㄌㄨˊ)) (1046 BC–?)
  - Chen (陳(ㄔㄣˊ)) (1045–478 BC) – Ruled by the House of Gui (媯) of Huaxia descent
  - Lu (魯(ㄌㄨˇ)) (1043–249 BC) – Ruled by the House of Ji (姬) of Huaxia descent
  - Ji (祭(ㄐㄧˋ)) (1040–750 BC) – Ruled by the House of Ji (姬) of Huaxia descent
  - Xing (邢(ㄒㄧㄥˊ)) (1040–635 BC) – Ruled by the House of Ji (姬) of Huaxia descent
  - Hong (江(ㄏㄨㄥˊ)) (1040–623 BC) – Ruled by the House of Ying (嬴) of Huaxia descent
  - Jiang (蔣(ㄐㄧㄤˇ)) (1040–617 BC) – Ruled by the House of Ji (姬) of Huaxia descent
  - Shen (沈(ㄕㄣˇ)) (1040–506 BC) – Ruled by the House of Ji (姬) of Huaxia descent
  - Song (宋(ㄙㄨㄥˋ)) (1040–286 BC) – Ruled by the House of Zi (子) of Huaxia descent
  - Wei (衞(ㄨㄟˋ)) (1040–661 BC, 659–209 BC) – Ruled by the House of Ji (姬) of Huaxia descent
  - Zuo (胙(ㄗㄨㄛˋ)) (1040 BC–?) – Ruled by the House of Ji (姬) of Huaxia descent
  - Dan (聃(ㄉㄢ)) (1040 BC–?) – Ruled by the House of Ji (姬) of Huaxia descent
  - Pugu (薄姑(ㄆㄨˊ ㄍㄨ)) (?–1039 BC)
  - Jin (晉(ㄐㄧㄣˋ)) (1033–376 BC) – Ruled by the House of Ji (姬) of Huaxia descent
    - Yi (翼(ㄧˋ)) (745–679 BC)
    - Quwo (曲沃(ㄑㄩ ㄨㄛˋ)) (745–679 BC)
  - Ying (應(ㄧㄥˋ)) (1030–646 BC) – Ruled by the House of Ji (姬) of Huaxia descent
  - Chu (楚(ㄔㄨˇ)) (1030–223 BC) – Ruled by the House of Mi (芈) of Huaxia descent
    - Yuezhang (越章(ㄩㄝˋ ㄓㄤ)) (880 BC–?)
  - Yin (殷(ㄧㄣ)) (1027–1024 BC) – Ruled by the House of Zi (子) of Huaxia descent
  - Yang (楊(ㄧㄤˊ)) (1020–677 BC) – Ruled by the House of Ji (姬) of Huaxia descent
  - Nuo (那(ㄋㄨㄛˊ)) (11th century–704 BC) – Ruled by the House of Ji (姬) of Huaxia descent
  - Luo (羅(ㄌㄨㄛˊ)) (11th century–690 BC) – Ruled by the House of Mi (芈) of Huaxia descent
  - Jia (賈(ㄐㄧㄚˇ)) (11th century–678 BC) – Ruled by the House of Ji (姬) of Huaxia descent
  - Hao (郝(ㄏㄠˇ)) (11th century–7th century BC) – Ruled by the House of Feng (風) of Huaxia descent
  - Ji (薊(ㄐㄧˋ)) (11th century–7th century BC) – Ruled by the House of Yiqi (伊祁) of Huaxia descent
  - Lai (賴(ㄌㄞˋ)) (11th century–538 BC) – Ruled by the House of Jiang (姜) of Huaxia descent
  - Wei (韋(ㄨㄟˊ)) (11th century BC–?) – Ruled by the House of Ji (姬) of Huaxia descent
  - Pi (邳(ㄆㄧ)) (11th century BC–?) – Ruled by the House of Ren (任) of Huaxia descent
  - Qin (秦(ㄑㄧㄣˊ)) (905–221 BC) – Ruled by the House of Ying (嬴) of Huaxia descent
  - Sui (隨(ㄙㄨㄟˊ)) (10th century BC–?) – Ruled by the House of Ji (姬) of Huaxia descent
  - Xie (謝(ㄒㄧㄝˋ)) (?–841 BC) – Ruled by the House of Ren (任) of Huaxia descent
  - Shen (申(ㄕㄣ)) (841 BC–?) – Ruled by the House of Jiang (姜) of Huaxia descent
  - Zhan (詹(ㄓㄢ)) (827 BC–?) – Ruled by the House of Ji (姬) of Huaxia descent
  - Zheng (鄭(ㄓㄥˋ)) (806–375 BC) – Ruled by the House of Ji (姬) of Huaxia descent
  - Daluo (大駱(ㄉㄚˋ ㄌㄨㄛˋ)) (?–9th century BC) – Ruled by the House of Ying (嬴) of Huaxia descent
  - Lan (濫(ㄌㄢˋ)) (781–521 BC) – Ruled by the House of Cao (曹) of Huaxia descent
  - Yin (尹(ㄧㄣˇ)) (770–513 BC) – Ruled by the House of Ji (姞) of Huaxia descent
  - Kuai (鄶(ㄎㄨㄞˋ)) (?–769 BC) – Ruled by the House of Yun (妘) of Huaxia descent
  - Liang (梁(ㄌㄧㄤˊ)) (768–641 BC) – Ruled by the House of Ying (嬴) of Huaxia descent
  - Hu (胡(ㄏㄨˊ)) (?–763 BC) – Ruled by the House of Ji (姬) of Huaxia descent
  - Han (韓(ㄏㄢˊ)) (?–757 BC) – Ruled by the House of Ji (姬) of Huaxia descent
  - Ji (極(ㄐㄧˊ)) (?–721 BC) – Ruled by the House of Ji (姬) of Huaxia descent
  - Xiang (向(ㄒㄧㄤˋ)) (?–721 BC) – Ruled by the House of Jiang (姜) of Huaxia descent
  - Fan (凡(ㄈㄢˊ)) (?–716 BC) – Ruled by the House of Ji (姬) of Huaxia descent
  - Dai (戴(ㄉㄞˋ)) (?–713 BC) – Ruled by the House of Zi (子) of Huaxia descent
  - Jiao (絞(ㄐㄧㄠˇ)) (?–700 BC) – Ruled by the House of Yan (偃) of Huaxia descent
  - Gu (穀(ㄍㄨˇ)) (?–8th century BC) – Ruled by the House of Ying (嬴) of Huaxia descent
  - Hua (華(ㄏㄨㄚˊ)) (?–8th century BC) – Ruled by the House of Zi (子) of Huaxia descent
  - Zhongli (鍾離(ㄓㄨㄥ ㄌㄧˊ)) (8th century–601 BC) – Ruled by the House of Ying (嬴) of Huaxia descent
  - Ni (郳(ㄋㄧˊ)) (8th century–335 BC) – Ruled by the House of Cao (曹) of Huaxia descent
    - Xiaozhu (小邾(ㄒㄧㄠˇ ㄓㄨ)) (653–335 BC)
  - Yuyuqiu (於餘邱(ㄩˊ ㄩˊ ㄑㄧㄡ)) (?–692 BC)
  - Ji (紀(ㄐㄧˋ)) (?–690 BC) – Ruled by the House of Jiang (姜) of Huaxia descent
  - Lu (盧(ㄌㄨˊ)) (?–690 BC) – Ruled by the House of Gui (媯) of Huaxia descent
  - Lesser Guo (小虢(ㄒㄧㄠˇ ㄍㄨㄛˊ)) (?–687 BC) – Ruled by the House of Ji (姬) of Huaxia descent
  - Sui (遂(ㄙㄨㄟˋ)) (?–681 BC) – Ruled by the House of Gui (媯) of Huaxia descent
  - Xiao (蕭(ㄒㄧㄠ)) (681–597 BC) – Ruled by the House of Zi (子) of Huaxia descent
  - Guo (郭(ㄍㄨㄛ)) (?–670 BC)
  - Lirong (驪戎(ㄌㄧˊ ㄖㄨㄥˊ)) (?–666 BC) – Ruled by the House of Ji (姬) of Xirong descent
  - Zhang (鄣(ㄓㄤ)) (?–664 BC) – Ruled by the House of Jiang (姜) of Huaxia descent
  - Lingzhi (令支(ㄌㄧㄥˋ ㄓ)) (?–664 BC)
  - Geng (耿(ㄍㄥˇ)) (?–661 BC) – Ruled by the House of Ji (姬) of Huaxia descent
  - Wei (魏(ㄨㄟˋ)) (?–661 BC) – Ruled by the House of Ji (姬) of Huaxia descent
  - Gong (共(ㄍㄨㄥˋ)) (?–660 BC) – Ruled by the House of Ji (姬) of Huaxia descent
  - Yang (陽(ㄧㄤˊ)) (?–660 BC) – Ruled by the House of Ji (姬) of Huaxia descent
  - Xian (弦(ㄒㄧㄢˊ)) (?–655 BC) – Ruled by the House of Wei (隗) of Huaxia descent
  - Guang (光(ㄍㄨㄤ)) (?–650 BC) – Ruled by the House of Ji (姞) of Huaxia descent
  - Huang (黃(ㄏㄨㄤˊ)) (?–648 BC) – Ruled by the House of Ying (嬴) of Huaxia descent
  - Xiang (項(ㄒㄧㄤˋ)) (?–643 BC)
  - Bai (柏(ㄅㄞˇ)) (?–640 BC) – Ruled by the House of Ji (姞) of Huaxia descent
  - Fan (樊(ㄈㄢˊ)) (?–635 BC) – Ruled by the House of Ji (姬) of Huaxia descent
  - Kui (夔(ㄎㄨㄟˊ)) (?–634 BC) – Ruled by the House of Mi (芈) of Huaxia descent
  - Hua (滑(ㄏㄨㄚˊ)) (?–627 BC) – Ruled by the House of Ji (姬) of Huaxia descent
  - Liao (蓼(ㄌㄧㄠˇ)) (?–622 BC) – Ruled by the House of Yan (偃) of Huaxia descent
  - Xuqu (須句(ㄒㄩ ㄑㄩˊ)) (?–620 BC) – Ruled by the House of Feng (風) of Huaxia descent
  - Yu (魚(ㄩˊ)) (?–612 BC) – Ruled by the House of Er (兒) of Huaxia descent
  - Yong (庸(ㄩㄥ)) (?–611 BC)
  - Jun (麇(ㄐㄩㄣ)) (?–611 BC)
  - Li (黎(ㄌㄧˊ)) (?–604 BC) – Ruled by the House of Qi (祁) of Huaxia descent and the House of Ji (姬) of Huaxia descent
  - Lushi (潞氏(ㄌㄨˋ ㄕˋ)) (604–594 BC) – Ruled by the House of Wei (隗) of Chidi descent
  - Western Huang (西黃(ㄒㄧ ㄏㄨㄤˊ)) (?–7th century BC)
  - Duochen (鐸辰(ㄉㄨㄛˊ ㄔㄣˊ)) (?–593 BC) – Ruled by the House of Wei (隗) of Huaxia descent
  - Jiashi (甲氏(ㄐㄧㄚˇ ㄕˋ)) (?–593 BC) – Ruled by the House of Wei (隗) of Huaxia descent
  - Liuyu (留吁(ㄌㄧㄡˊ ㄩˋ)) (?–593 BC) – Ruled by the House of Wei (隗) of Huaxia descent
  - Liu (劉(ㄌㄧㄡˊ)) (592–488 BC) – Ruled by the House of Ji (姬) of Huaxia descent
  - Qianggaoru (廧咎如(ㄑㄧㄤˊ ㄍㄠ ㄖㄨˊ)) (?–588 BC) – Ruled by the House of Wei (隗) of Chidi descent
  - Zhuan (鄟(ㄓㄨㄢ)) (?–585 BC)
  - Zeng (鄫(ㄗㄥ)) (?–567 BC) – Ruled by the House of Si (姒) of Huaxia descent
  - Lai (萊(ㄌㄞˊ)) (?–567 BC) – Ruled by the House of Zi (子) of Dongyi descent
  - Biyang (偪陽(ㄅㄧ ㄧㄤˊ)) (?–563 BC) – Ruled by the House of Yun (妘) of Huaxia descent
  - Wangshu (王叔(ㄨㄤˊ ㄕㄨ)) (?–563 BC) – Ruled by the House of Ji (姬) of Huaxia descent
  - Shi (邿(ㄕ)) (?–560 BC) – Ruled by the House of Ren (妊) of Huaxia descent
  - Yin (陰(ㄧㄣ)) (?–532 BC)
  - Fei (肥(ㄈㄟˊ)) (?–530 BC) – Ruled by the House of Ji (姬) of Baidi descent
  - Fang (房(ㄈㄤˊ)) (?–529 BC) – Ruled by the House of Qi (祁) of Huaxia descent
  - Zhoulai (州來(ㄓㄡ ㄌㄞˊ)) (?–529 BC) – Ruled by the House of Ji (姬) of Huaxia descent
  - Yang (養(ㄧㄤˇ)) (?–528 BC) – Ruled by the House of Ying (嬴) of Huaxia descent
  - Gu (鼓(ㄍㄨˇ)) (?–520 BC) – Ruled by the House of Qi (祁) of Baidi descent
  - Chao (巢(ㄔㄠˊ)) (?–518 BC) – Ruled by the House of Yan (偃) of Huaxia descent
  - Gong (鞏(ㄍㄨㄥˇ)) (?–516 BC) – Ruled by the House of Ji (姬) of Huaxia descent
  - Xu (徐(ㄒㄩˊ)) (?–512 BC) – Ruled by the House of Ying (嬴) of Huaxia descent
  - Zhongshan (中山(ㄓㄨㄥ ㄕㄢ)) (507–406 BC, 380–296 BC) – Ruled by the House of Ji (姬) of Beidi descent
  - Xianyu (鮮虞(ㄒㄧㄢ ㄩˊ)) (?–506 BC) – Ruled by the House of Ji (姬) of Beidi descent
  - Tang (唐(ㄊㄤˊ)) (?–505 BC) – Ruled by the House of Qi (祁) of Huaxia descent
- Xia dynasty (夏朝(ㄒㄧㄚˋ ㄔㄠˊ)) (2070–1600 BC) – Semi-legendary; Ruled by the House of Si (姒) of Huaxia descent
- Shang dynasty (商朝(ㄕㄤ ㄔㄠˊ)) (1600–1046 BC) – Ruled by the House of Zi (子) of Huaxia descent
- Jizi Chaoxian (箕子朝鮮(ㄐㄧ ㄗˇ ㄔㄠˊ ㄒㄧㄢˇ)) (1120–194 BC) – Ruled by the House of Zi (子) of Huaxia descent
- Zhou dynasty (周朝(ㄓㄡ ㄔㄠˊ)) (1046–256 BC) – Ruled by the House of Ji (姬) of Huaxia descent
  - Western Zhou (西周(ㄒㄧ ㄓㄡ)) (1046–771 BC)
  - Eastern Zhou (東周(ㄉㄨㄥ ㄓㄡ)) (770–256 BC)
- Eight States of Xirong (西戎八國(ㄒㄧ ㄖㄨㄥˊ ㄅㄚ ㄍㄨㄛˊ)) (720–272 BC, ?–?)
  - Yiqu (義渠(ㄧˋ ㄑㄩˊ)) (720–272 BC) – Ruled by the House of Yiqu (義渠) of Xirong descent
  - Mianzhu (緜諸(ㄇㄧㄢˊ ㄓㄨ)) (?–395 BC)
  - Dirong (狄戎(ㄉㄧˊ ㄖㄨㄥˊ)) (?–?)
  - Huanrong (豲戎(ㄏㄨㄢˊ ㄖㄨㄥˊ)) (?–?)
  - Gunyi (緄夷(ㄍㄨㄣˇ ㄧˊ)) (?–?)
  - Wuzhi (烏氏(ㄨ ㄓ)) (?–?)
  - Quyan (朐衍(ㄑㄩˊ ㄧㄢˇ)) (?–?)
  - Rong of Dali (大荔之戎(ㄉㄚˋ ㄌㄧˋ ㄓ ㄖㄨㄥˊ)) (?–?)
- Ruo (鄀(ㄖㄨㄛˋ)) (622 BC, ?–?)
  - Lower Ruo (下鄀(ㄒㄧㄚˋ ㄖㄨㄛˋ)) (?–622 BC)
  - Upper Ruo (上鄀(ㄕㄤˋ ㄖㄨㄛˋ)) (622 BC–?)
- Twelve Minor Kingdoms of Tibet (吐蕃十二小邦(ㄊㄨˇ ㄅㄛ ㄕˊ ㄦˋ ㄒㄧㄠˇ ㄅㄤ)) (500 BC–AD 625, ?–?)
  - Zhang-zhung (象雄(ㄒㄧㄤˋ ㄒㄩㄥˊ)) (500 BC–AD 625)
  - mChims-yul (琛域(ㄔㄣ ㄩˋ)) (?–?)
  - Myang-ro-phyong-dkar (娘若瓊嘎(ㄋㄧㄤˊ ㄖㄨㄛˋ ㄑㄩㄥˊ ㄍㄚ)) (?–?)
  - gNubs-yul-gling-dgu (努域陵古(ㄋㄨˇ ㄩˋ ㄌㄧㄥˊ ㄍㄨˇ)) (?–?)
  - Nyang-ro-sham-bo (娘若香波(ㄋㄧㄤˊ ㄖㄨㄛˋ ㄒㄧㄤ ㄅㄛ)) (?–?)
  - Kyi-ri-ljon-snyon (吉日窮恩(ㄐㄧˊ ㄖˋ ㄑㄩㄥˊ ㄣ)) (?–?)
  - Nyam-sho dKhra-sna (昂雪查那(ㄤˊ ㄒㄩㄝˇ ㄔㄚˊ ㄋㄚˋ)) (?–?)
  - Ol-phu-spang-mkhar (約甫邦卡(ㄩㄝ ㄈㄨˇ ㄅㄤ ㄎㄚˇ)) (?–?)
  - Sribs-yul-gyi-ral-gong (西布域瑞貢(ㄒㄧ ㄅㄨˋ ㄩˋ ㄖㄨㄟˋ ㄍㄨㄥˋ)) (?–?)
  - Kong-yul-bre-sna (工域哲那(ㄍㄨㄥ ㄩˋ ㄓㄜˊ ㄋㄚˋ)) (?–?)
  - Nyan gYul-rnam-gsum (娘域納松(ㄋㄧㄤˊ ㄩˋ ㄋㄚˋ ㄙㄨㄥ)) (?–?)
  - Dwags-yul-gru-bnyi (達域楚奚(ㄉㄚˊ ㄩˋ ㄔㄨˇ ㄒㄧ)) (?–?)
- Hu (胡(ㄏㄨˊ)) (?–496 BC) – Ruled by the House of Gui (歸) of Huaxia descent
- Gumie (姑蔑(ㄍㄨ ㄇㄧㄝˋ)) (?–480 BC)
- Zhongwu (鍾吾(ㄓㄨㄥ ㄨˊ)) (?–471 BC)
- Western Zhou (西周(ㄒㄧ ㄓㄡ)) (440–256 BC) – Ruled by the House of Ji (姬) of Huaxia descent
- Tan (郯(ㄊㄢˊ)) (?–414 BC) – Ruled by the House of Ji (己) of Huaxia descent
- Han (韓(ㄏㄢˊ)) (403–230 BC) – Ruled by the House of Ji (姬) of Huaxia descent
- Wei (魏(ㄨㄟˋ)) (403–225 BC) – Ruled by the House of Ji (姬) of Huaxia descent
- Zhao (趙(ㄓㄠˋ)) (403–222 BC) – Ruled by the House of Ying (嬴) of Huaxia descent
  - Dai (代(ㄉㄞˋ)) (227–222 BC)
- Zeng (曾(ㄗㄥ)) (?–5th century BC) – Ruled by the House of Ji (姬) of Huaxia descent
- Chouyou (仇由(ㄔㄡˊ ㄧㄡˊ)) (?–5th century BC)
- Ju (苴(ㄐㄩ)) (368–316 BC)
- Eastern Zhou (東周(ㄉㄨㄥ ㄓㄡ)) (367–249 BC) – Ruled by the House of Ji (姬) of Huaxia descent
- Minyue (閩越(ㄇㄧㄣˇ ㄩㄝˋ)) (334–111 BC) – Ruled by the House of Zou (騶) of Baiyue descent
- Daguang (達光(ㄉㄚˊ ㄍㄨㄤ)) (4th century BC–AD 6th century)
  - Mangjilazha dynasty (莽紀拉扎王朝(ㄇㄤˇ ㄐㄧˋ ㄌㄚ ㄓㄚ ㄨㄤˊ ㄔㄠˊ)) (?–?)
  - Shangmuda dynasty (尚穆達王朝(ㄕㄤˇ ㄇㄨˇ ㄉㄚˊ ㄨㄤˊ ㄔㄠˊ)) (?–?)
- Xue (薛(ㄒㄩㄝ)) (?–298 BC) – Ruled by the House of Ren (任) of Huaxia descent and the House of Gui (媯) of Huaxia descent
- Dian (滇(ㄉㄧㄢ)) (278–109 BC)
- Ouluo (甌駱(ㄡ ㄌㄨㄛˋ)) (257–179 BC) – Ruled by the House of Shu (蜀)
- Buyeo (扶餘(ㄈㄨˊ ㄩˊ)) (239 BC–AD 494)
  - Northern Buyeo (北扶餘(ㄅㄟˇ ㄈㄨˊ ㄩˊ)) (239–58 BC)
    - Jolbon Buyeo (卒本扶餘(ㄗㄨˊ ㄅㄣˇ ㄈㄨˊ ㄩˊ)) (86–37 BC)
    - Eastern Buyeo (東扶餘(ㄉㄨㄥ ㄈㄨˊ ㄩˊ)) (86 BC–AD 22)
      - Galsa Buyeo (後扶餘(ㄏㄡˋ ㄈㄨˊ ㄩˊ)) (AD 22–494)
- Dai (代(ㄉㄞˋ)) (228–222 BC) – Ruled by the House of Ying (嬴) of Huaxia descent
- Qin dynasty (秦朝(ㄑㄧㄣˊ ㄔㄠˊ)) (221–207 BC) – Ruled by the House of Ying (嬴) of Huaxia descent
- Zhang Chu (張楚(ㄓㄤ ㄔㄨˇ)) (209–208 BC) – Ruled by the House of Chen (陳) of Huaxia descent
- Chu (楚(ㄔㄨˇ)) (209–206 BC) – Ruled by the House of Xiang (襄) of Huaxia descent and the House of Mi (羋) of Huaxia descent
- Yan (燕(ㄧㄢ)) (209–206 BC) – Ruled by the House of Han (韓) of Huaxia descent
- Zhao (趙(ㄓㄠˋ)) (209–204 BC, 203–202 BC) – Ruled by the House of Wu (武) of Huaxia descent, the House of Ying (嬴) of Huaxia descent, and the House of Zhang (張) of Huaxia descent
- Xiongnu confederation (匈奴(ㄒㄩㄥ ㄋㄨˊ)) (209 BC–AD 48) – Ruled by the House of Luandi (攣鞮) of Xiongnu descent
  - Northern Xiongnu (北匈奴(ㄅㄟˇ ㄒㄩㄥ ㄋㄨˊ)) (AD 48–155)
  - Southern Xiongnu (南匈奴(ㄋㄢˊ ㄒㄩㄥ ㄋㄨˊ)) (AD 48–216)
- Wei (魏(ㄨㄟˋ)) (208–206 BC) – Ruled by the House of Ji (姬) of Huaxia descent
- Eighteen Kingdoms (十八國(ㄕˊ ㄅㄚ ㄍㄨㄛˊ)) (208–202 BC)
  - Han (韓(ㄏㄢˊ)) (208–205 BC) – Ruled by the House of Ji (姬) of Huaxia descent and the House of Zheng (鄭) of Huaxia descent
  - Sai (塞(ㄙㄞˋ)) (206 BC) – Ruled by the House of Sima (司馬) of Huaxia descent
  - Di (翟(ㄉㄧˊ)) (206 BC) – Ruled by the House of Dong (董) of Huaxia descent
  - Liaodong (遼東(ㄌㄧㄠˊ ㄉㄨㄥ)) (206 BC) – Ruled by the House of Han (韓) of Huaxia descent
  - Jiaodong (膠東(ㄐㄧㄠ ㄉㄨㄥ)) (206 BC) – Ruled by the House of Gui (媯) of Huaxia descent
  - Qi (齊(ㄑㄧˊ)) (206 BC) – Ruled by the House of Gui (媯) of Huaxia descent
  - Jibei (濟北(ㄐㄧˇ ㄅㄟˇ)) (206 BC) – Ruled by the House of Gui (媯) of Huaxia descent
  - Yong (雍(ㄩㄥ)) (206–205 BC) – Ruled by the House of Zhang (章) of Huaxia descent
  - Western Wei (西魏(ㄒㄧ ㄨㄟˋ)) (206–205 BC) – Ruled by the House of Ji (姬) of Huaxia descent
  - Henan (河南(ㄏㄜˊ ㄋㄢˊ)) (206–205 BC) – Ruled by the House of Shen (申) of Huaxia descent
  - Yin (殷(ㄧㄣ)) (206–205 BC) – Ruled by the House of Sima (司馬) of Huaxia descent
  - Changshan (常山(ㄔㄤˊ ㄕㄢ)) (206–205 BC) – Ruled by the House of Zhang (張) of Huaxia descent
  - Dai (代(ㄉㄞˋ)) (206–205 BC) – Ruled by the House of Ying (嬴) of Huaxia descent
  - Jiujiang (九江(ㄐㄧㄡˇ ㄐㄧㄤ)) (206–203 BC) – Ruled by the House of Ying (英) of Huaxia descent
  - Han (漢(ㄏㄢˋ)) (206–202 BC) – Ruled by the House of Liu (劉) of Huaxia descent
  - Hengshan (衡山(ㄏㄥˊ ㄕㄢ)) (206–202 BC) – Ruled by the House of Wu (吳) of Huaxia descent
  - Yan (燕(ㄧㄢ)) (206–202 BC) – Ruled by the House of Zang (臧) of Huaxia descent
  - Linjiang (臨江(ㄌㄧㄣˊ ㄐㄧㄤ)) (206–202 BC) – Ruled by the House of Gong (共) of Huaxia descent
- Linzi (臨淄(ㄌㄧㄣˊ ㄗ)) (206 BC) – Ruled by the House of Gui (媯) of Huaxia descent
- Western Chu (西楚(ㄒㄧ ㄔㄨˇ)) (206–202 BC) – Ruled by the House of Mi (芈) of Huaxia descent
- Dai (代(ㄉㄞˋ)) (205–204 BC) – Ruled by the House of Chen (陳) of Huaxia descent
- Dynastic principalities under the Han dynasty (漢朝藩王國(ㄏㄢˋ ㄔㄠˊ ㄈㄢ ㄨㄤˊ ㄍㄨㄛˊ)) (205 BC–AD 9, AD 25–221)
  - Non-agnatic dynastic principalities under the Western Han (西漢異姓藩王國(ㄒㄧ ㄏㄢˋ ㄧˋ ㄒㄧㄥˋ ㄈㄢ ㄨㄤˊ ㄍㄨㄛˊ)) (205–157 BC)
    - Han (韓(ㄏㄢˊ)) (205–200 BC) – Ruled by the House of Ji (姬) of Han descent
    - Qi (齊(ㄑㄧˊ)) (203–202 BC) – Ruled by the House of Han (韓) of Han descent
    - Huainan (淮南(ㄏㄨㄞˊ ㄋㄢˊ)) (203–196 BC) – Ruled by the House of Ying (英) of Han descent
    - Zhao (趙(ㄓㄠˋ)) (203–198 BC, 180 BC) – Ruled by the House of Zhang (張) of Han descent and the House of Lü (呂) of Han descent
    - Chu (楚(ㄔㄨˇ)) (202–201 BC)
    - Liang (梁(ㄌㄧㄤˊ)) (202–196 BC) – Ruled by the House of Peng (彭) of Han descent
    - Yan (燕(ㄧㄢ)) (202–196 BC, 180 BC) – Ruled by the House of Lu (盧) of Han descent and the House of Lü (呂) of Han descent
    - Changsha (長沙(ㄔㄤˊ ㄕㄚ)) (202–157 BC) – Ruled by the House of Wu (吳) of Han descent
    - Lü (呂(ㄌㄩˇ)) (187–180 BC) – Ruled by the House of Lü (呂) of Han descent
    - Lu (魯(ㄌㄨˇ)) (187–180 BC) – Ruled by the House of Zhang (張) of Han descent
  - Agnatic dynastic principalities under the Western Han (西漢同姓藩王國(ㄒㄧ ㄏㄢˋ ㄊㄨㄥˊ ㄒㄧㄥˋ ㄈㄢ ㄨㄤˊ ㄍㄨㄛˊ)) (201 BC–AD 9) – Ruled by the House of Liu (劉) of Han descent
    - Jing (荊(ㄐㄧㄥ)) (201–196 BC)
    - Qi (齊(ㄑㄧˊ)) (201–127 BC, 117–110 BC)
    - Chu (楚(ㄔㄨˇ)) (201–69 BC, 50 BC–AD 9)
    - Dai (代(ㄉㄞˋ)) (200–198 BC, 196–114 BC)
    - Zhao (趙(ㄓㄠˋ)) (198–181 BC, 179–154 BC, 152 BC–AD 9)
    - Huainan (淮南(ㄏㄨㄞˊ ㄋㄢˊ)) (196–174 BC, 168–165 BC, 164–122 BC)
    - Liang (梁(ㄌㄧㄤˊ)) (196–181 BC, 180 BC, 178 BC–AD 3, AD 5–9)
    - Wu (吳(ㄨˊ)) (195–154 BC)
    - Yan (燕(ㄧㄢ)) (195–181 BC, 179–127 BC, 117–80 BC)
    - Hengshan (恆山(ㄏㄥˊ ㄕㄢ)) (187–180 BC)
    - Huaiyang (淮陽(ㄏㄨㄞˊ ㄧㄤˊ)) (187–180 BC, 176–169 BC, 155–154 BC, 63 BC–AD 9)
    - Langya (琅邪(ㄌㄤˊ ㄧㄚˊ)) (181–179 BC)
    - Jichuan (濟川(ㄐㄧˇ ㄔㄨㄢ)) (181–180 BC, 144–138 BC)
    - Taiyuan (太原(ㄊㄞˋ ㄩㄢˊ)) (178–176 BC)
    - Jibei (濟北(ㄐㄧˇ ㄅㄟˇ)) (178–177 BC, 164–154 BC, 153–87 BC)
    - Chengyang (城陽(ㄔㄥˊ ㄧㄤˊ)) (178–169 BC, 165 BC–AD 9)
    - Hejian (河間(ㄏㄜˊ ㄐㄧㄢ)) (178–165 BC, 155 BC–AD 9)
    - Jinan (濟南(ㄐㄧˇ ㄋㄢˊ)) (164–154 BC)
    - Lujiang (廬江(ㄌㄨˊ ㄐㄧㄤ)) (164–153 BC)
    - Hengshan (衡山(ㄏㄥˊ ㄕㄢ)) (164–122 BC)
    - Jiaoxi (膠西(ㄐㄧㄠ ㄒㄧ)) (164–108 BC)
    - Jiaodong (膠東(ㄐㄧㄠ ㄉㄨㄥ)) (164–150 BC, 148 BC–AD 9)
    - Zichuan (菑川(ㄗ ㄔㄨㄢ)) (164 BC–AD 9)
    - Runan (汝南(ㄖㄨˇ ㄋㄢˊ)) (155–153 BC)
    - Linjiang (臨江(ㄌㄧㄣˊ ㄐㄧㄤ)) (155–153 BC, 150–148 BC)
    - Guangchuan (廣川(ㄍㄨㄤˇ ㄔㄨㄢ)) (155–152 BC, 148–70 BC, 66–50 BC)
    - Changsha (長沙(ㄔㄤˊ ㄕㄚ)) (155 BC–AD 9)
    - Lu (魯(ㄌㄨˇ)) (154–6 BC, 4 BC–AD 9)
    - Zhongshan (中山(ㄓㄨㄥ ㄕㄢ)) (154–54 BC, 44–35 BC, 23–1 BC, AD 1–9)
    - Jiangdu (江都(ㄐㄧㄤ ㄉㄨ)) (153–121 BC)
    - Qinghe (清河(ㄑㄧㄥ ㄏㄜˊ)) (147–136 BC, 114–66 BC, 47–44 BC)
    - Changshan (常山(ㄔㄤˊ ㄕㄢ)) (145–113 BC)
    - Jiyin (濟陰(ㄐㄧˇ ㄧㄣ)) (144–143 BC)
    - Jidong (濟東(ㄐㄧˇ ㄉㄨㄥ)) (144–116 BC)
    - Shanyang (山陽(ㄕㄢ ㄧㄤˊ)) (144–136 BC, 33–25 BC)
    - Liu'an (六安(ㄌㄧㄡˋ ㄢ)) (121 BC–AD 9)
    - Guangling (廣陵(ㄍㄨㄤˇ ㄌㄧㄥˊ)) (117–54 BC, 47–17 BC, 11 BC–AD 9)
    - Zhending (真定(ㄓㄣ ㄉㄧㄥˋ)) (114 BC–AD 9)
    - Sishui (泗水(ㄙˋ ㄕㄨㄟˇ)) (113 BC–AD 9)
    - Changyi (昌邑(ㄔㄤ ㄧˋ)) (97–74 BC)
    - Pinggan (平干(ㄆㄧㄥˊ ㄍㄢ)) (91–56 BC)
    - Guangyang (廣陽(ㄍㄨㄤˇ ㄧㄤˊ)) (73 BC–AD 9)
    - Gaomi (高密(ㄍㄠ ㄇㄧˋ)) (73 BC–AD 9)
    - Dingtao (定陶(ㄉㄧㄥˋ ㄊㄠˊ)) (52–50 BC, 25–5 BC)
    - Dongping (東平(ㄉㄨㄥ ㄆㄧㄥˊ)) (52–4 BC, AD 1–7)
    - Jiyang (濟陽(ㄐㄧˇ ㄧㄤˊ)) (41–33 BC)
    - Xindu (信都(ㄒㄧㄣˋ ㄉㄨ)) (37–23 BC, 5 BC–AD 9)
    - Guangde (廣德(ㄍㄨㄤˇ ㄉㄜˊ)) (19–18 BC, AD 2–9)
    - Guangping (廣平(ㄍㄨㄤˇ ㄆㄧㄥˊ)) (4 BC–AD 9)
    - Guangshi (廣世(ㄍㄨㄤˇ ㄕˋ)) (AD 2–9)
    - Guangzong (廣宗(ㄍㄨㄤˇ ㄗㄨㄥ)) (AD 2–9)
  - Agnatic dynastic principalities under the Eastern Han (東漢同姓藩王國(ㄉㄨㄥ ㄏㄢˋ ㄊㄨㄥˊ ㄒㄧㄥˋ ㄈㄢ ㄨㄤˊ ㄍㄨㄛˊ)) (AD 25–221) – Ruled by the House of Liu (劉) of Han descent
    - Huaiyang (淮陽(ㄏㄨㄞˊ ㄧㄤˊ)) (AD 25, AD 41–73, AD 79–87)
    - Guangyang (廣陽(ㄍㄨㄤˇ ㄧㄤˊ)) (AD 26–29)
    - Sishui (泗水(ㄙˋ ㄕㄨㄟˇ)) (AD 26–34)
    - Zichuan (淄川(ㄗ ㄔㄨㄢ)) (AD 26–34)
    - Taiyuan (太原(ㄊㄞˋ ㄩㄢˊ)) (AD 26–35)
    - Zhending (真定(ㄓㄣ ㄉㄧㄥˋ)) (AD 26–37)
    - Changsha (長沙(ㄔㄤˊ ㄕㄚ)) (AD 26–37)
    - Lu (魯(ㄌㄨˇ)) (AD 26–37, AD 41–52)
    - Chengyang (城陽(ㄔㄥˊ ㄧㄤˊ)) (AD 26–35, AD 90–94)
    - Zhongshan (中山(ㄓㄨㄥ ㄕㄢ)) (AD 26–37, AD 41–44, AD 54–174)
    - Zhao (趙(ㄓㄠˋ)) (AD 29–213)
    - Hejian (河間(ㄏㄜˊ ㄐㄧㄢ)) (AD 31–37, AD 90–220)
    - Zuopingyi (左馮翊(ㄗㄨㄛˇ ㄆㄧㄥˊ ㄧˋ)) (AD 41–54)
    - Shanyang (山陽(ㄕㄢ ㄧㄤˊ)) (AD 41–58, AD 212–220)
    - Chu (楚(ㄔㄨˇ)) (AD 41–70)
    - Qi (齊(ㄑㄧˊ)) (AD 41–87, AD 90–206)
    - Langya (琅邪(ㄌㄤˊ ㄧㄚˊ)) (AD 41–216)
    - Jinan (濟南(ㄐㄧˇ ㄋㄢˊ)) (AD 41–153, AD 174–220)
    - Donghai (東海(ㄉㄨㄥ ㄏㄞˇ)) (AD 41–220)
    - Dongping (東平(ㄉㄨㄥ ㄆㄧㄥˊ)) (AD 41–220)
    - Pei (沛(ㄆㄟˋ)) (AD 44–220)
    - Beihai (北海(ㄅㄟˇ ㄏㄞˇ)) (AD 52–206)
    - Guangling (廣陵(ㄍㄨㄤˇ ㄌㄧㄥˊ)) (AD 58–67)
    - Guangping (廣平(ㄍㄨㄤˇ ㄆㄧㄥˊ)) (AD 60–82)
    - Qiancheng (千乘(ㄑㄧㄢ ㄔㄥˊ)) (AD 60–95)
    - Julu (鉅鹿(ㄐㄩˋ ㄌㄨˋ)) (AD 72–79)
    - Runan (汝南(ㄖㄨˇ ㄋㄢˊ)) (AD 72–79)
    - Lecheng (樂成(ㄌㄜˋ ㄔㄥˊ)) (AD 72–96, AD 97–119, AD 120–121)
    - Changshan (常山(ㄔㄤˊ ㄕㄢ)) (AD 72–184)
    - Xiapi (下邳(ㄒㄧㄚˋ ㄆㄧ)) (AD 72–185)
    - Jiyin (濟陰(ㄐㄧˇ ㄧㄣ)) (AD 72–84, AD 124–125, AD 212–220)
    - Fuling (阜陵(ㄈㄨˋ ㄌㄧㄥˊ)) (AD 73–206)
    - Pingchun (平春(ㄆㄧㄥˊ ㄔㄨㄣ)) (AD 79)
    - Jiangling (江陵(ㄐㄧㄤ ㄌㄧㄥˊ)) (AD 79–85)
    - Liang (梁(ㄌㄧㄤˊ)) (AD 79–220)
    - Xiping (西平(ㄒㄧ ㄆㄧㄥˊ)) (AD 82–88)
    - Qinghe (清河(ㄑㄧㄥ ㄏㄜˊ)) (AD 82–147)
    - Rencheng (任城(ㄖㄣˋ ㄔㄥˊ)) (AD 84–220)
    - Liu'an (六安(ㄌㄧㄡˋ ㄢ)) (AD 85–88)
    - Chen (陳(ㄔㄣˊ)) (AD 88–197)
    - Pengcheng (彭城(ㄆㄥˊ ㄔㄥˊ)) (AD 88–220)
    - Jibei (濟北(ㄐㄧˇ ㄅㄟˇ)) (AD 90–206, AD 212–220)
    - Guangzong (廣宗(ㄍㄨㄤˇ ㄗㄨㄥ)) (AD 93)
    - Le'an (樂安(ㄌㄜˋ ㄢ)) (AD 95–146)
    - Pingyuan (平原(ㄆㄧㄥˊ ㄩㄢˊ)) (AD 106–206)
    - Guangchuan (廣川(ㄍㄨㄤˇ ㄔㄨㄢ)) (AD 107–108)
    - Anping (安平(ㄢ ㄆㄧㄥˊ)) (AD 122–184)
    - Bohai (渤海(ㄅㄛˊ ㄏㄞˇ)) (AD 146–172, AD 189)
    - Ganling (甘陵(ㄍㄢ ㄌㄧㄥˊ)) (AD 148–189)
    - Chenliu (陳留(ㄔㄣˊ ㄌㄧㄡˊ)) (AD 189)
    - Hongnong (弘農(ㄏㄨㄥˊ ㄋㄨㄥˊ)) (AD 189–190)
    - Nanyang (南陽(ㄋㄢˊ ㄧㄤˊ)) (AD 200)
    - Donghai (東海(ㄉㄨㄥ ㄏㄞˇ)) (AD 212–220)
    - Boling (博陵(ㄅㄛˊ ㄌㄧㄥˊ)) (AD 213–220)
    - Hanzhong (漢中(ㄏㄢˋ ㄓㄨㄥ)) (AD 219–221)
  - Non-agnatic dynastic principalities under the Eastern Han (東漢異姓藩王國(ㄉㄨㄥ ㄏㄢˋ ㄧˋ ㄒㄧㄥˋ ㄈㄢ ㄨㄤˊ ㄍㄨㄛˊ)) (AD 40–42, AD 216–220)
    - Dai (代(ㄉㄞˋ)) (AD 40–42) – Ruled by the House of Lu (盧) of Han descent
    - Wei (魏(ㄨㄟˋ)) (AD 216–220) – Ruled by the House of Cao (曹) of Han descent
- Nanyue (南越(ㄋㄢˊ ㄩㄝˋ)) (204–111 BC) – Ruled by the House of Zhao (趙) of Huaxia descent
- Han dynasty (漢朝(ㄏㄢˋ ㄔㄠˊ)) (202 BC–AD 9, AD 25–220) – Ruled by the House of Liu (劉) of Han descent
  - Western Han (西漢(ㄒㄧ ㄏㄢˋ)) (202 BC–AD 9)
  - Eastern Han (東漢(ㄉㄨㄥ ㄏㄢˋ)) (AD 25–220)
- Thirty-six States of the Western Regions (西域三十六國(ㄒㄧ ㄩˋ ㄙㄢ ㄕˊ ㄌㄧㄡˋ ㄍㄨㄛˊ)) (200 BC–AD 1006, ?–?)
  - Shule (疏勒(ㄕㄨ ㄌㄜˋ)) (200 BC–AD 790)
  - Loulan (樓蘭(ㄌㄡˊ ㄌㄢˊ)) (176–77 BC)
    - Shanshan (鄯善(ㄕㄢˋ ㄕㄢˋ)) (77 BC–AD 630)
  - Kucha (龜茲(ㄑㄧㄡ ㄘˊ)) (72 BC–AD 788)
  - Jushi (車師(ㄐㄩ ㄕ)) (71 BC–AD 508)
    - Nearer Jushi (車師前國(ㄐㄩ ㄕ ㄑㄧㄢˊ ㄍㄨㄛˊ)) (71 BC–AD 508)
    - Further Jushi (車師後國(ㄐㄩ ㄕ ㄏㄡˋ ㄍㄨㄛˊ)) (67 BC–AD 170)
  - Suoju (莎車(ㄙㄨㄛ ㄐㄩ)) (66 BC–AD 89)
  - Khotan (于闐(ㄩˊ ㄊㄧㄢˊ)) (AD 56–1006) – Ruled by the House of Yuchi (尉遲) of Saka descent
    - Jin (金(ㄐㄧㄣ)) (AD 851–938)
    - Dabao Yutian (大寶于闐(ㄉㄚˋ ㄅㄠˇ ㄩˊ ㄊㄧㄢˊ)) (AD 938–983)
    - Jinyu (金玉(ㄐㄧㄣ ㄩˋ)) (AD 983–?)
  - Yanqi (焉耆(ㄧㄢ ㄑㄧˊ)) (AD 58–792) – Ruled by the House of Long (龍)
  - Ruoqiang (若羌(ㄖㄨㄛˋ ㄑㄧㄤ)) (?–?)
  - Qiemo (且末(ㄑㄧㄝˇ ㄇㄛˋ)) (?–?)
  - Xiaoyuan (小宛(ㄒㄧㄠˇ ㄩㄢ)) (?–?)
  - Jingjue (精絕(ㄐㄧㄥ ㄐㄩㄝˊ)) (?–?)
  - Ronglu (戎盧(ㄖㄨㄥˊ ㄌㄨˊ)) (?–?)
  - Hanmi (扞罙(ㄏㄢˋ ㄇㄧˊ)) (?–?)
  - Qule (渠勒(ㄑㄩˊ ㄌㄜˋ)) (?–?)
  - Pishan (皮山(ㄆㄧˊ ㄕㄢ)) (?–?)
  - Wucha (烏秅(ㄨ ㄔㄚˊ)) (?–?)
  - Yinai (依耐(ㄧ ㄋㄞˋ)) (?–?)
  - Xiye (西夜(ㄒㄧ ㄧㄝˋ)) (?–?)
  - Zihe (子合(ㄗˇ ㄏㄜˊ)) (?–?)
  - Puli (蒲犁(ㄆㄨˊ ㄌㄧˊ)) (?–?)
  - Nandou (難兜(ㄋㄢˊ ㄉㄡ)) (?–?)
  - Dayuan (大宛(ㄉㄚˋ ㄩㄢ)) (?–?)
  - Taohuai (桃槐(ㄊㄠˊ ㄏㄨㄞˊ)) (?–?)
  - Juandu (捐毒(ㄐㄩㄢ ㄉㄨˊ)) (?–?)
  - Gumo (姑墨(ㄍㄨ ㄇㄛˋ)) (?–?)
  - Wensu (溫宿(ㄨㄣ ㄙㄨˋ)) (?–?)
  - Quli (渠犂(ㄑㄩˊ ㄌㄧˊ)) (?–?)
  - Wulei (烏壘(ㄨ ㄌㄟˇ)) (?–?)
  - Yuli (尉犂(ㄩˋ ㄌㄧˊ)) (?–?)
  - Weixu (危須(ㄨㄟ ㄒㄩ)) (?–?)
  - Beilu (卑陸(ㄅㄟ ㄌㄨˋ)) (?–?)
    - Further Beilu (卑陸後國(ㄅㄟ ㄌㄨˋ ㄏㄡˋ ㄍㄨㄛˊ)) (?–?)
  - Jie (劫(ㄐㄧㄝˊ)) (?–?)
  - Pulei (蒲類(ㄆㄨˊ ㄌㄟˋ)) (?–?)
    - Nearer Pulei (蒲類前國(ㄆㄨˊ ㄌㄟˋ ㄑㄧㄢˊ ㄍㄨㄛˊ)) (?–?)
    - Further Pulei (蒲類後國(ㄆㄨˊ ㄌㄟˋ ㄏㄡˋ ㄍㄨㄛˊ)) (?–?)
  - Qiemi (且彌(ㄑㄧㄝˇ ㄇㄧˊ)) (?–?)
    - Eastern Qiemi (東且彌國(ㄉㄨㄥ ㄑㄧㄝˇ ㄇㄧˊ ㄍㄨㄛˊ)) (?–?)
    - Western Qiemi (西且彌國(ㄒㄧ ㄑㄧㄝˇ ㄇㄧˊ ㄍㄨㄛˊ)) (?–?)
  - Shan (山(ㄕㄢ)) (?–?)
  - Huhu (狐胡(ㄏㄨˊ ㄏㄨˊ)) (?–?)
  - Wulei (無雷(ㄨˊ ㄌㄟˊ)) (?–?)
  - Weitou (尉頭(ㄨㄟˋ ㄊㄡˊ)) (?–?)
  - Xiuxun (休循(ㄒㄧㄡ ㄒㄩㄣˊ)) (?–?)
- Yelang (夜郎(ㄧㄝˋ ㄌㄤˊ)) (3rd century–27 BC)
- Ailao (哀牢(ㄞ ㄌㄠˊ)) (3rd century BC–AD 76)
- Nanhai (南海(ㄋㄢˊ ㄏㄞˇ)) (195–174 BC)
- Weiman Chaoxian (衛滿朝鮮(ㄨㄟˋ ㄇㄢˇ ㄔㄠˊ ㄒㄧㄢˇ)) (194–108 BC) – Ruled by the House of Wei (衛)
- Eastern Ou (東甌(ㄉㄨㄥ ㄡ)) (191–138 BC) – Ruled by the House of Zou (騶)
- Baiyang (白羊(ㄅㄞˊ ㄧㄤˊ)) (?–127 BC)
- Loufan (樓煩(ㄌㄡˊ ㄈㄢˊ)) (?–127 BC)
- Yarlung dynasty (雅礱王朝(ㄧㄚˇ ㄌㄨㄥˊ ㄨㄤˊ ㄔㄠˊ)) (127 BC–AD 618) – Ruled by the House of sPu-rgyal (悉補野) of Tibetan descent
- Wusun (烏孫(ㄨ ㄙㄨㄣ)) (117 BC–?)
- Gouding (鉤町(ㄍㄡ ㄉㄧㄥ)) (111 BC–AD 316)
- Dongming (東明(ㄉㄨㄥ ㄇㄧㄥˊ)) (?–108 BC)
- Woju (沃沮(ㄨㄛˋ ㄐㄩ)) (2nd century BC–AD 5th century)
  - Eastern Woju (東沃沮(ㄉㄨㄥ ㄨㄛˋ ㄐㄩ)) (?–?)
  - Northern Woju (北沃沮(ㄅㄟˇ ㄨㄛˋ ㄐㄩ)) (?–?)
- Goguryeo (高句麗(ㄍㄠ ㄍㄡ ㄌㄧˊ)) (37 BC–AD 668) – Ruled by the Go dynasty (高) of Yemaek descent
- Feiliu (沸流(ㄈㄟˋ ㄌㄧㄡˊ)) (?–36 BC)
- Lelang (樂浪(ㄌㄜˋ ㄌㄤˋ)) (1st century BC–AD 47)
- Gaima (蓋馬(ㄍㄞˋ ㄇㄚˇ)) (1st century BC–AD 1st century)
- Goutu (句荼(ㄍㄡ ㄊㄨˊ)) (1st century BC–AD 1st century)
- Xin dynasty (新朝(ㄒㄧㄣ ㄔㄠˊ)) (AD 9–23) – Interrupted the Han dynasty; Ruled by the House of Wang (王) of Han descent
- Xuan Han (玄漢(ㄒㄩㄢˊ ㄏㄢˋ)) (AD 23–25) – Ruled by the House of Liu (劉) of Han descent
- Huainan (淮南(ㄏㄨㄞˊ ㄋㄢˊ)) (AD 23–27) – Ruled by the House of Li (李) of Han descent
- Dynastic principalities under the Xuan Han (玄漢藩王國(ㄒㄩㄢˊ ㄏㄢˋ ㄈㄢ ㄨㄤˊ ㄍㄨㄛˊ)) (AD 23–?)
  - Agnatic dynastic principalities under the Xuan Han (玄漢同姓藩王國(ㄒㄩㄢˊ ㄏㄢˋ ㄊㄨㄥˊ ㄒㄧㄥˋ ㄈㄢ ㄨㄤˊ ㄍㄨㄛˊ)) (AD 23–27) – Ruled by the House of Liu (劉) of Han descent
    - Liang (梁(ㄌㄧㄤˊ)) (AD 23–25)
    - Wan (宛(ㄨㄢˇ)) (AD 24–25)
    - Yan (燕(ㄧㄢ)) (AD 24–25)
    - Ruyin (汝陰(ㄖㄨˇ ㄧㄣ)) (AD 24–25)
    - Xiao (蕭(ㄒㄧㄠ)) (AD 24–25)
    - Dingtao (定陶(ㄉㄧㄥˋ ㄊㄠˊ)) (AD 24–26)
    - Yuanshi (元氏(ㄩㄢˊ ㄕˋ)) (AD 24–26)
    - Hanzhong (漢中(ㄏㄢˋ ㄓㄨㄥ)) (AD 24–27)
  - Non-agnatic dynastic principalities under the Xuan Han (玄漢異姓藩王國(ㄒㄩㄢˊ ㄏㄢˋ ㄧˋ ㄒㄧㄥˋ ㄈㄢ ㄨㄤˊ ㄍㄨㄛˊ)) (AD 24–?)
    - Biyang (比陽(ㄅㄧˇ ㄧㄤˊ)) (AD 24–25) – Ruled by the House of Wang (王) of Han descent
    - Huaiyang (淮陽(ㄏㄨㄞˊ ㄧㄤˊ)) (AD 24–25) – Ruled by the House of Zhang (張) of Han descent
    - Rang (穰(ㄖㄤˊ)) (AD 24–25) – Ruled by the House of Liao (廖) of Han descent
    - Pingshi (平氏(ㄆㄧㄥˊ ㄕˋ)) (AD 24–25) – Ruled by the House of Shen (申) of Han descent
    - Sui (隨(ㄙㄨㄟˊ)) (AD 24–25) – Ruled by the House of Hu (胡) of Han descent
    - Xiping (西平(ㄒㄧ ㄆㄧㄥˊ)) (AD 24–25) – Ruled by the House of Li (李) of Han descent
    - Wuyin (舞陰(ㄨˇ ㄧㄣ)) (AD 24–25) – Ruled by the House of Li (李) of Han descent
    - Xiangyi (襄邑(ㄒㄧㄤ ㄧˋ)) (AD 24–25) – Ruled by the House of Cheng (成) of Han descent
    - Yinping (陰平(ㄧㄣ ㄆㄧㄥˊ)) (AD 24–25) – Ruled by the House of Chen (陳) of Han descent
    - Deng (鄧(ㄉㄥˋ)) (AD 24–26) – Ruled by the House of Wang (王) of Han descent
    - Yan (郾(ㄧㄢˇ)) (AD 24–26) – Ruled by the House of Yin (尹) of Han descent
    - Yicheng (宜城(ㄧˊ ㄔㄥˊ)) (AD 24–?) – Ruled by the House of Wang (王) of Han descent
    - Yingyin (潁陰(ㄧㄥˇ ㄧㄣ)) (AD 24–?) – Ruled by the House of Zong (宗) of Han descent
- Chuli (楚黎(ㄔㄨˇ ㄌㄧˊ)) (AD 24–29) – Ruled by the House of Qin (秦) of Han descent
- Agnatic dynastic principality under the Chimei Han (赤眉漢同姓藩王國(ㄔˋ ㄇㄟˊ ㄏㄢˋ ㄊㄨㄥˊ ㄒㄧㄥˋ ㄈㄢ ㄨㄤˊ ㄍㄨㄛˊ)) (AD 25) – Ruled by the House of Liu (劉) of Han descent
  - Changsha (長沙(ㄔㄤˊ ㄕㄚ)) (AD 25)
- Xiping (西平(ㄒㄧ ㄆㄧㄥˊ)) (AD 25) – Ruled by the House of Lu (盧) of Han descent
  - Lu Han (盧漢(ㄌㄨˊ ㄏㄢˋ)) (AD 25–?)
- Chimei Han (赤眉漢(ㄔˋ ㄇㄟˊ ㄏㄢˋ)) (AD 25–27) – Ruled by the House of Liu (劉) of Han descent
- Liu Liang (劉梁(ㄌㄧㄡˊ ㄌㄧㄤˊ)) (AD 25–29) – Ruled by the House of Liu (劉) of Han descent
- Chengjia (成家(ㄔㄥˊ ㄐㄧㄚ)) (AD 25–36) – Ruled by the House of Gongsun (公孫) of Han descent
  - Shu (蜀(ㄕㄨˇ)) (AD 24–25)
- Dynastic principalities under the Liu Liang (劉梁藩王國(ㄌㄧㄡˊ ㄌㄧㄤˊ ㄈㄢ ㄨㄤˊ ㄍㄨㄛˊ)) (AD 25–?)
  - Agnatic dynastic principalities under the Liu Liang (劉梁同姓藩王國(ㄌㄧㄡˊ ㄌㄧㄤˊ ㄊㄨㄥˊ ㄒㄧㄥˋ ㄈㄢ ㄨㄤˊ ㄍㄨㄛˊ)) (AD 25–?) – Ruled by the House of Liu (劉) of Han descent
    - Lu (魯(ㄌㄨˇ)) (AD 25–?)
    - Huaiyang (淮陽(ㄏㄨㄞˊ ㄧㄤˊ)) (AD 26)
  - Non-agnatic dynastic principalities under the Liu Liang (劉梁異姓藩王國(ㄌㄧㄡˊ ㄌㄧㄤˊ ㄧˋ ㄒㄧㄥˋ ㄈㄢ ㄨㄤˊ ㄍㄨㄛˊ)) (AD 27–30)
    - Qi (齊(ㄑㄧˊ)) (AD 27–29) – Ruled by the House of Zhang (張) of Han descent
    - Haixi (海西(ㄏㄞˇ ㄒㄧ)) (AD 27–30) – Ruled by the House of Dong (董) of Han descent
- Wu'an (武安(ㄨˇ ㄢ)) (AD 26–27) – Ruled by the House of Yan (延) of Han descent
- Northern Daifang (北帶方(ㄅㄟˇ ㄉㄞˋ ㄈㄤ)) (?–AD 27)
- Non-agnatic dynastic principalities under the Chengjia (成家異姓藩王國(ㄔㄥˊ ㄐㄧㄚ ㄧˋ ㄒㄧㄥˋ ㄈㄢ ㄨㄤˊ ㄍㄨㄛˊ)) (AD 29–36)
  - Runing (汝寧(ㄖㄨˇ ㄋㄧㄥˊ)) (AD 29–36) – Ruled by the House of Yan (延) of Han descent
  - Yijiang (翼江(ㄧˋ ㄐㄧㄤ)) (AD 29–36) – Ruled by the House of Tian (田) of Han descent
  - Shuoning (朔寧(ㄕㄨㄛˋ ㄋㄧㄥˊ)) (AD 31–34) – Ruled by the House of Wei (隗) of Han descent
- Xianbei state (鮮卑(ㄒㄧㄢ ㄅㄟ)) (AD 93–234)
  - Northern Xianbei (北鮮卑(ㄅㄟˇ ㄒㄧㄢ ㄅㄟ)) (AD ?–?)
  - Western Xianbei (西鮮卑(ㄒㄧ ㄒㄧㄢ ㄅㄟ)) (AD ?–?)
  - Eastern Xianbei (東鮮卑(ㄉㄨㄥ ㄒㄧㄢ ㄅㄟ)) (AD ?–?)
- Shaodang Qiang (燒當羌(ㄕㄠ ㄉㄤ ㄑㄧㄤ)) (?–AD 139)
- Yueban (悅般(ㄩㄝˋ ㄅㄢ)) (AD 160–490)
- Zhongjia (仲家(ㄓㄨㄥˋ ㄐㄧㄚ)) (AD 197–199) – Ruled by the House of Yuan (袁) of Han descent
- Bailan (白蘭(ㄅㄞˊ ㄌㄢˊ)) (AD 2nd century–?)
- Hexi tribe (河西部(ㄏㄜˊ ㄒㄧ ㄅㄨˋ)) (AD 210–397) – Ruled by the House of Tufa (禿髮) of Xianbei descent
- Three Kingdoms (三國(ㄙㄢ ㄍㄨㄛˊ)) (AD 220–280)
  - Cao Wei (曹魏(ㄘㄠˊ ㄨㄟˋ)) (AD 220–266) – Ruled by the House of Cao (曹) of Han descent
  - Shu Han (蜀漢(ㄕㄨˇ ㄏㄢˋ)) (AD 221–263) – Ruled by the House of Liu (劉) of Han descent
  - Eastern Wu (東吳(ㄉㄨㄥ ㄨˊ)) (AD 222–280) – Ruled by the House of Sun (孫) of Han descent
- Agnatic dynastic principalities under the Shu Han (蜀漢同姓藩王國(ㄕㄨˇ ㄏㄢˋ ㄊㄨㄥˊ ㄒㄧㄥˋ ㄈㄢ ㄨㄤˊ ㄍㄨㄛˊ)) (AD 221–263) – Ruled by the House of Liu (劉) of Han descent
  - Lu (魯(ㄌㄨˇ)) (AD 221–230)
  - Liang (梁(ㄌㄧㄤˊ)) (AD 221–230)
  - Ganling (甘陵(ㄍㄢ ㄌㄧㄥˊ)) (AD 230–263)
  - Anping (安平(ㄢ ㄆㄧㄥˊ)) (AD 230–263)
  - Anding (安定(ㄢ ㄉㄧㄥˋ)) (AD 238–263)
  - Xihe (西河(ㄒㄧ ㄏㄜˊ)) (AD 252–262)
  - Xinping (新平(ㄒㄧㄣ ㄆㄧㄥˊ)) (AD 256–263)
  - Beidi (北地(ㄅㄟˇ ㄉㄧˋ)) (AD 259–263)
  - Xinxing (新興(ㄒㄧㄣ ㄒㄧㄥ)) (AD 259–263)
  - Shangdang (上黨(ㄕㄤˋ ㄉㄤˇ)) (AD 259–263)
- Dynastic principalities under the Cao Wei (曹魏藩王國(ㄘㄠˊ ㄨㄟˋ ㄈㄢ ㄨㄤˊ ㄍㄨㄛˊ)) (AD 221–?)
  - Non-agnatic dynastic principalities under the Cao Wei (曹魏異姓藩王國(ㄘㄠˊ ㄨㄟˋ ㄧˋ ㄒㄧㄥˋ ㄈㄢ ㄨㄤˊ ㄍㄨㄛˊ)) (AD 221–222, AD 264–266)
    - Wu (吳(ㄨˊ)) (AD 221–222) – Ruled by the House of Sun (孫) of Han descent
    - Jin (晉(ㄐㄧㄣˋ)) (AD 264–266) – Ruled by the House of Sima (司馬) of Han descent
  - Agnatic dynastic principalities under the Cao Wei (曹魏同姓藩王國(ㄘㄠˊ ㄨㄟˋ ㄊㄨㄥˊ ㄒㄧㄥˋ ㄈㄢ ㄨㄤˊ ㄍㄨㄛˊ)) (AD 222–?) – Ruled by the House of Cao (曹) of Han descent
    - Zhangling (章陵(ㄓㄤ ㄌㄧㄥˊ)) (AD 222)
    - Yiyang (義陽(ㄧˋ ㄧㄤˊ)) (AD 222)
    - Yiyang (弋陽(ㄧˋ ㄧㄤˊ)) (AD 222)
    - Lujiang (廬江(ㄌㄨˊ ㄐㄧㄤ)) (AD 222–223)
    - Huainan (淮南(ㄏㄨㄞˊ ㄋㄢˊ)) (AD 222–223)
    - Guangping (廣平(ㄍㄨㄤˇ ㄆㄧㄥˊ)) (AD 222–223)
    - Jiyin (濟陰(ㄐㄧˇ ㄧㄣ)) (AD 222–224)
    - Xiapi (下邳(ㄒㄧㄚˋ ㄆㄧ)) (AD 222–224)
    - Hejian (河間(ㄏㄜˊ ㄐㄧㄢ)) (AD 222–224)
    - Wu (吳(ㄨˊ)) (AD 222–224)
    - Hedong (河東(ㄏㄜˊ ㄉㄨㄥ)) (AD 222–225)
    - Jingzhao (京兆(ㄐㄧㄥ ㄓㄠˋ)) (AD 222–225)
    - Qiao (譙(ㄑㄧㄠˊ)) (AD 222–226)
    - Pingyuan (平原(ㄆㄧㄥˊ ㄩㄢˊ)) (AD 222–226)
    - Qinghe (清河(ㄑㄧㄥ ㄏㄜˊ)) (AD 222–223, AD 226)
    - Juancheng (鄄城(ㄐㄩㄢˋ ㄔㄥˊ)) (AD 222–223, AD 226–232)
    - Beihai (北海(ㄅㄟˇ ㄏㄞˇ)) (AD 222–224, AD 232–233)
    - Rencheng (任城(ㄖㄣˋ ㄔㄥˊ)) (AD 222–223, AD 224–246)
    - Pengcheng (彭城(ㄆㄥˊ ㄔㄥˊ)) (AD 222, AD 232–266)
    - Chenliu (陳留(ㄔㄣˊ ㄌㄧㄡˊ)) (AD 222–224, AD 232–266)
    - Zhongmou (中牟(ㄓㄨㄥ ㄇㄡˊ)) (AD 223–224)
    - Yongqiu (雍丘(ㄩㄥ ㄑㄧㄡ)) (AD 223–227, AD 228–229)
    - Chen (陳(ㄔㄣˊ)) (AD 223–224, AD 232)
    - Shouzhang (壽張(ㄕㄡˋ ㄓㄤ)) (AD 223–232)
    - Fanyang (范陽(ㄈㄢˋ ㄧㄤˊ)) (AD 224–226)
    - Lecheng (樂城(ㄌㄜˋ ㄔㄥˊ)) (AD 224–226)
    - Shouchun (壽春(ㄕㄡˋ ㄔㄨㄣ)) (AD 224–226)
    - Dingtao (定陶(ㄉㄧㄥˋ ㄊㄠˊ)) (AD 224–232)
    - Shanfu (單父(ㄕㄢˋ ㄈㄨˋ)) (AD 224–232)
    - Xiangyi (襄邑(ㄒㄧㄤ ㄧˋ)) (AD 224–232)
    - Zan (贊(ㄗㄢˋ)) (AD 224–226, AD 235–248)
    - Dongwuyang (東武陽(ㄉㄨㄥ ㄨˇ ㄧㄤˊ)) (AD 225)
    - Guantao (館陶(ㄍㄨㄢˇ ㄊㄠˊ)) (AD 225–232)
    - Yuancheng (元城(ㄩㄢˊ ㄔㄥˊ)) (AD 225–232)
    - Handan (邯鄲(ㄏㄢˊ ㄉㄢ)) (AD 225–232)
    - Puyang (濮陽(ㄆㄨˊ ㄧㄤˊ)) (AD 226–232)
    - Juyang (句陽(ㄐㄩˋ ㄧㄤˊ)) (AD 226–232)
    - Julu (鉅鹿(ㄐㄩˋ ㄌㄨˋ)) (AD 226–232)
    - Baima (白馬(ㄅㄞˊ ㄇㄚˇ)) (AD 226–232)
    - Yangping (陽平(ㄧㄤˊ ㄆㄧㄥˊ)) (AD 226–232)
    - Junyi (浚儀(ㄐㄩㄣˋ ㄧˊ)) (AD 227–228)
    - Liaocheng (聊城(ㄌㄧㄠˊ ㄔㄥˊ)) (AD 227–232)
    - Fanyang (繁陽(ㄈㄢˊ ㄧㄤˊ)) (AD 228–229)
    - Dong'e (東阿(ㄉㄨㄥ ㄝ)) (AD 229–232)
    - Quyang (曲陽(ㄑㄩ ㄧㄤˊ)) (AD 232–244)
    - Chu (楚(ㄔㄨˇ)) (AD 232–251)
    - Zhao (趙(ㄓㄠˋ)) (AD 232–261)
    - Jibei (濟北(ㄐㄧˇ ㄅㄟˇ)) (AD 232–266)
    - Yan (燕(ㄧㄢ)) (AD 232–266)
    - Pei (沛(ㄆㄟˋ)) (AD 232–266)
    - Zhongshan (中山(ㄓㄨㄥ ㄕㄢ)) (AD 232–266)
    - Langya (琅邪(ㄌㄤˊ ㄧㄚˊ)) (AD 232–266)
    - Dongping (東平(ㄉㄨㄥ ㄆㄧㄥˊ)) (AD 232–266)
    - Liang (梁(ㄌㄧㄤˊ)) (AD 232–266)
    - Lu (魯(ㄌㄨˇ)) (AD 232–266)
    - Donghai (東海(ㄉㄨㄥ ㄏㄞˇ)) (AD 232–266)
    - Xiang (相(ㄒㄧㄤ)) (AD 233–236, AD 255–166)
    - Xiao (蕭(ㄒㄧㄠ)) (AD 234–?)
    - Qin (秦(ㄑㄧㄣˊ)) (AD 235–244)
    - Qi (齊(ㄑㄧˊ)) (AD 235–239, AD 254–266)
    - Rao'an (饒安(ㄖㄠˊ ㄢ)) (AD 238–246)
    - Laoling (樂陵(ㄌㄠˋ ㄌㄧㄥˊ)) (AD 244–266)
    - Jinan (濟南(ㄐㄧˇ ㄋㄢˊ)) (AD 246–266)
    - Wen'an (文安(ㄨㄣˊ ㄢ)) (AD 246–266)
    - Feng (豐(ㄈㄥ)) (AD 254–266)
    - Zhending (真定(ㄓㄣ ㄉㄧㄥˋ)) (AD 254–266)
- Yan (燕(ㄧㄢ)) (AD 237–238) – Ruled by the House of Gongsun (公孫) of Han descent
- Agnatic dynastic principalities under the Eastern Wu (東吳同姓藩王國(ㄉㄨㄥ ㄨˊ ㄊㄨㄥˊ ㄒㄧㄥˋ ㄈㄢ ㄨㄤˊ ㄍㄨㄛˊ)) (AD 242–?) – Ruled by the House of Sun (孫) of Han descent
  - Lu (魯(ㄌㄨˇ)) (AD 242–250, AD 273–280)
  - Nanyang (南陽(ㄋㄢˊ ㄧㄤˊ)) (AD 252–253)
  - Langya (琅邪(ㄌㄤˊ ㄧㄚˊ)) (AD 252–258)
  - Qi (齊(ㄑㄧˊ)) (AD 252–253, AD 273–?)
  - Kuaiji (會稽(ㄎㄨㄞˋ ㄐㄧ)) (AD 258–260)
  - Yuzhang (豫章(ㄩˋ ㄓㄤ)) (AD 264–265)
  - Runan (汝南(ㄖㄨˇ ㄋㄢˊ)) (AD 264–265)
  - Liang (梁(ㄌㄧㄤˊ)) (AD 264–?)
  - Chen (陳(ㄔㄣˊ)) (AD 264–?)
  - Huaiyang (淮陽(ㄏㄨㄞˊ ㄧㄤˊ)) (AD 269–273)
  - Dongping (東平(ㄉㄨㄥ ㄆㄧㄥˊ)) (AD 269–273)
  - Chenliu (陳留(ㄔㄣˊ ㄌㄧㄡˊ)) (AD 273–?)
  - Zhangling (章陵(ㄓㄤ ㄌㄧㄥˊ)) (AD 273–?)
  - Chengji (成紀(ㄔㄥˊ ㄐㄧˋ)) (AD 278–?)
  - Xuanwei (宣威(ㄒㄩㄢ ㄨㄟ)) (AD 278–?)
  - Zhongshan (中山(ㄓㄨㄥ ㄕㄢ)) (AD 280–?)
  - Dai (代(ㄉㄞˋ)) (AD 280–?)
- Duan tribe (段部(ㄉㄨㄢˋ ㄅㄨˋ)) (AD 250–356) – Ruled by the Duan tribe (段) of Xianbei descent
  - Liaoxi (遼西(ㄌㄧㄠˊ ㄒㄧ)) (AD 313–338)
  - Duan Qi (段齊(ㄉㄨㄢˋ ㄑㄧˊ)) (AD 350–356)
  - Duan Zhao (段趙(ㄉㄨㄢˋ ㄓㄠˋ)) (AD 352)
- Longxi tribe (隴西部(ㄌㄨㄥˇ ㄒㄧ ㄅㄨˋ)) (AD 265–376) – Ruled by the House of Qifu (乞伏) of Xianbei descent
- Jin dynasty (晉朝(ㄐㄧㄣˋ ㄔㄠˊ)) (AD 266–420) – Ruled by the House of Sima (司馬) of Han descent
  - Western Jin (西晉(ㄒㄧ ㄐㄧㄣˋ)) (AD 266–316)
  - Eastern Jin (東晉(ㄉㄨㄥ ㄐㄧㄣˋ)) (AD 317–420)
- Dynastic principalities under the Jin dynasty (晉朝藩王國(ㄐㄧㄣˋ ㄔㄠˊ ㄈㄢ ㄨㄤˊ ㄍㄨㄛˊ)) (AD 266–?)
  - Non-agnatic dynastic principalities under the Jin dynasty (晉朝異姓藩王國(ㄐㄧㄣˋ ㄔㄠˊ ㄧˋ ㄒㄧㄥˋ ㄈㄢ ㄨㄤˊ ㄍㄨㄛˊ)) (AD 266–420)
    - Chenliu (陳留(ㄔㄣˊ ㄌㄧㄡˊ)) (AD 266–420) – Ruled by the House of Cao (曹) of Han descent
    - Chu (楚(ㄔㄨˇ)) (AD 403) – Ruled by the House of Huan (桓) of Han descent
    - Song (宋(ㄙㄨㄥˋ)) (AD 419–420) – Ruled by the House of Liu (劉) of Han descent
  - Agnatic dynastic principalities under the Jin dynasty (晉朝同姓藩王國(ㄐㄧㄣˋ ㄔㄠˊ ㄊㄨㄥˊ ㄒㄧㄥˋ ㄈㄢ ㄨㄤˊ ㄍㄨㄛˊ)) (AD 266–?) – Ruled by the House of Sima (司馬) of Han descent
    - Bohai (勃海(ㄅㄛˊ ㄏㄞˇ)) (AD 266–277)
    - Chen (陳(ㄔㄣˊ)) (AD 266–277)
    - Dongguan (東莞(ㄉㄨㄥ ㄍㄨㄢˇ)) (AD 266–277)
    - Fufeng (扶風(ㄈㄨˊ ㄈㄥ)) (AD 266–289)
    - Taiyuan (太原(ㄊㄞˋ ㄩㄢˊ)) (AD 266–291)
    - Longxi (隴西(ㄌㄨㄥˇ ㄒㄧ)) (AD 266–296)
    - Ruyin (汝陰(ㄖㄨˇ ㄧㄣ)) (AD 266–277, AD ?–286, AD 300)
    - Yiyang (義陽(ㄧˋ ㄧㄤˊ)) (AD 266–301)
    - Changshan (常山(ㄔㄤˊ ㄕㄢ)) (AD 266–275, AD 291–301)
    - Beihai (北海(ㄅㄟˇ ㄏㄞˇ)) (AD 266–277, AD 283–302)
    - Le'an (樂安(ㄌㄜˋ ㄢ)) (AD 266–302)
    - Yan (燕(ㄧㄢ)) (AD 266–302)
    - Zhongshan (中山(ㄓㄨㄥ ㄕㄢ)) (AD 266–304)
    - Dongping (東平(ㄉㄨㄥ ㄆㄧㄥˊ)) (AD 266–307)
    - Xiapi (下邳(ㄒㄧㄚˋ ㄆㄧ)) (AD 266–311)
    - Pei (沛(ㄆㄟˋ)) (AD 266–311)
    - Fanyang (范陽(ㄈㄢˋ ㄧㄤˊ)) (AD 266–311)
    - Jinan (濟南(ㄐㄧˇ ㄋㄢˊ)) (AD 266–277, ?–AD 311)
    - Pingyuan (平原(ㄆㄧㄥˊ ㄩㄢˊ)) (AD 266–311)
    - Qiao (譙(ㄑㄧㄠˊ)) (AD 266–403, AD 405–415)
    - Liang (梁(ㄌㄧㄤˊ)) (AD 266–417)
    - Langya (琅邪(ㄌㄤˊ ㄧㄚˊ)) (AD 266–418)
    - Gaoyang (高陽(ㄍㄠ ㄧㄤˊ)) (AD 266–278, AD 280–420)
    - Pengcheng (彭城(ㄆㄥˊ ㄔㄥˊ)) (AD 266–420)
    - Qi (齊(ㄑㄧˊ)) (AD 266–302, AD 303–420)
    - Hejian (河間(ㄏㄜˊ ㄐㄧㄢ)) (AD 266–306, AD 330–?)
    - Anping (安平(ㄢ ㄆㄧㄥˊ)) (AD 266–281, ?–?)
    - Chengyang (城陽(ㄔㄥˊ ㄧㄤˊ)) (AD 269–273)
    - Nangong (南宮(ㄋㄢˊ ㄍㄨㄥ)) (AD 270–289)
    - Runan (汝南(ㄖㄨˇ ㄋㄢˊ)) (AD 270–420)
    - Donghai (東海(ㄉㄨㄥ ㄏㄞˇ)) (AD 273–277, AD 291–402)
    - Guanghan (廣漢(ㄍㄨㄤˇ ㄏㄢˋ)) (AD 277–280)
    - Liaodong (遼東(ㄌㄧㄠˊ ㄉㄨㄥ)) (AD 277–283)
    - Shiping (始平(ㄕˇ ㄆㄧㄥˊ)) (AD 277–289)
    - Puyang (濮陽(ㄆㄨˊ ㄧㄤˊ)) (AD 277–289, AD 301)
    - Zhao (趙(ㄓㄠˋ)) (AD 277–301)
    - Rencheng (任城(ㄖㄣˋ ㄔㄥˊ)) (AD 277–311)
    - Xihe (西河(ㄒㄧ ㄏㄜˊ)) (AD 277–311)
    - Qinghe (清河(ㄑㄧㄥ ㄏㄜˊ)) (AD 277–311)
    - Nanyang (南陽(ㄋㄢˊ ㄧㄤˊ)) (AD 277–289, AD 306–319)
    - Zhangwu (章武(ㄓㄤ ㄨˇ)) (AD 277–311, AD 314–405)
    - Xindu (新都(ㄒㄧㄣ ㄉㄨ)) (AD 277–283, ?–?)
    - Leping (樂平(ㄌㄜˋ ㄆㄧㄥˊ)) (AD 280, 302–303)
    - Donglai (東萊(ㄉㄨㄥ ㄌㄞˊ)) (AD 283–301)
    - Changle (長樂(ㄔㄤˊ ㄌㄜˋ)) (AD 284–309)
    - Guangling (廣陵(ㄍㄨㄤˇ ㄌㄧㄥˊ)) (AD 289–290)
    - Piling (毗陵(ㄆㄧˊ ㄌㄧㄥˊ)) (AD 289–291)
    - Chu (楚(ㄔㄨˇ)) (AD 289–291)
    - Yuzhang (豫章(ㄩˋ ㄓㄤ)) (AD 289–304, AD 306–311)
    - Changsha (長沙(ㄔㄤˊ ㄕㄚ)) (AD 289–291, AD 301–311)
    - Shunyang (順陽(ㄕㄨㄣˋ ㄧㄤˊ)) (AD 289–311)
    - Qin (秦(ㄑㄧㄣˊ)) (AD 289–312)
    - Wu (吳(ㄨˊ)) (AD 289–300, AD 301–311, AD 326–327)
    - Wuyi (武邑(ㄨˇ ㄧˋ)) (AD 289–?)
    - Han (漢(ㄏㄢˋ)) (AD 289–?)
    - Dai (代(ㄉㄞˋ)) (AD 289–?)
    - Chengdu (成都(ㄔㄥˊ ㄉㄨ)) (AD 289–304, ?–?)
    - Huainan (淮南(ㄏㄨㄞˊ ㄋㄢˊ)) (AD 289–311, ?–?)
    - Zhongqiu (中丘(ㄓㄨㄥ ㄑㄧㄡ)) (AD 291–311)
    - Xiyang (西陽(ㄒㄧ ㄧㄤˊ)) (AD 291–326)
    - Dong'an (東安(ㄉㄨㄥ ㄢ)) (AD 291–?)
    - Gaomi (高密(ㄍㄠ ㄇㄧˋ)) (AD 296–420)
    - Jiyang (濟陽(ㄐㄧˇ ㄧㄤˊ)) (AD 300, AD 301–302)
    - Linhuai (臨淮(ㄌㄧㄣˊ ㄏㄨㄞˊ)) (AD 300, AD 308–311)
    - Xiangyang (襄陽(ㄒㄧㄤ ㄧㄤˊ)) (AD 300–311)
    - Nanping (南平(ㄋㄢˊ ㄆㄧㄥˊ)) (?–AD 301)
    - Jingzhao (京兆(ㄐㄧㄥ ㄓㄠˋ)) (AD 301)
    - Guangping (廣平(ㄍㄨㄤˇ ㄆㄧㄥˊ)) (AD 301)
    - Bacheng (霸城(ㄅㄚˋ ㄔㄥˊ)) (AD 301)
    - Huailing (淮陵(ㄏㄨㄞˊ ㄌㄧㄥˊ)) (AD 301–420)
    - Jiyang (棘陽(ㄐㄧˊ ㄧㄤˊ)) (AD 301–?)
    - Yidu (宜都(ㄧˊ ㄉㄨ)) (AD 301–?)
    - Guangyang (廣陽(ㄍㄨㄤˇ ㄧㄤˊ)) (AD 302)
    - Xinye (新野(ㄒㄧㄣ ㄧㄝˇ)) (AD 302–311)
    - Zhongdu (中都(ㄓㄨㄥ ㄉㄨ)) (AD 304–306)
    - Lujiang (廬江(ㄌㄨˊ ㄐㄧㄤ)) (AD 304–306)
    - Wuling (武陵(ㄨˇ ㄌㄧㄥˊ)) (AD 304–371, AD 387–420)
    - Ruyang (汝陽(ㄖㄨˇ ㄧㄤˊ)) (AD 305–311)
    - Nandun (南頓(ㄋㄢˊ ㄉㄨㄣˋ)) (AD 305–326)
    - Shangyong (上庸(ㄕㄤˋ ㄩㄥ)) (?–AD 306)
    - Dongyan (東燕(ㄉㄨㄥ ㄧㄢ)) (AD 306–307)
    - Lecheng (樂成(ㄌㄜˋ ㄔㄥˊ)) (AD 306–330)
    - Guangchuan (廣川(ㄍㄨㄤˇ ㄔㄨㄢ)) (?–AD 307)
    - Jingling (竟陵(ㄐㄧㄥˋ ㄌㄧㄥˊ)) (AD 307–311)
    - Huarong (華容(ㄏㄨㄚˊ ㄖㄨㄥˊ)) (AD 307–311)
    - Xincai (新蔡(ㄒㄧㄣ ㄘㄞˋ)) (AD 307–420)
    - Xincai (新蔡(ㄒㄧㄣ ㄘㄞˋ)) (?–AD 308)
    - Sui (隨(ㄙㄨㄟˊ)) (?–AD 311)
    - Liangcheng (良城(ㄌㄧㄤˊ ㄔㄥˊ)) (?–AD 311)
    - Jiyin (濟陰(ㄐㄧˇ ㄧㄣ)) (?–AD 311)
    - Jin (晉(ㄐㄧㄣˋ)) (AD 317–318, AD 319–320)
    - Yiyang (弋陽(ㄧˋ ㄧㄤˊ)) (AD 326–329)
    - Kuaiji (會稽(ㄎㄨㄞˋ ㄐㄧ)) (AD 327–417)
    - Xinning (新寧(ㄒㄧㄣ ㄋㄧㄥˊ)) (AD 384–387)
    - Linchuan (臨川(ㄌㄧㄣˊ ㄔㄨㄢ)) (AD 384–420)
- Tuyuhun (吐谷渾(ㄊㄨˇ ㄩˋ ㄏㄨㄣˊ)) (AD 284–608, AD 615–663) – Ruled by the House of Murong (慕容) of Xianbei descent
  - Qinghai (青海(ㄑㄧㄥ ㄏㄞˇ)) (AD 663–9th century)
- Qiuchi (仇池(ㄑㄧㄡˊ ㄔˊ)) (AD 296–371, AD 385–442, AD 443–477, AD 478–580) – Ruled by the House of Yang (楊) of Di descent
  - Former Qiuchi (前仇池(ㄑㄧㄢˊ ㄑㄧㄡˊ ㄔˊ)) (AD 296–371)
  - Later Qiuchi (後仇池(ㄏㄡˋ ㄑㄧㄡˊ ㄔˊ)) (AD 385–442)
  - Wudu (武都(ㄨˇ ㄉㄨ)) (AD 443–477)
  - Wuxing (武興(ㄨˇ ㄒㄧㄥ)) (AD 478–506, AD 529–553)
  - Yinping (陰平(ㄧㄣ ㄆㄧㄥˊ)) (AD 479–580)
- Mu'ege (慕俄格(ㄇㄨˋ ㄝˊ ㄍㄜˊ)) (AD 300–1698) – Ruled by the House of An (安) of Yi descent
  - Chiefdom of Shuixi (水西土司(ㄕㄨㄟˇ ㄒㄧ ㄊㄨˇ ㄙ)) (AD 1279–1698)
- Sixteen Kingdoms (十六國(ㄕˊ ㄌㄧㄡˋ ㄍㄨㄛˊ)) (AD 304–439)
  - Han-Zhao (漢趙(ㄏㄢˋ ㄓㄠˋ)) (AD 304–329) – Ruled by the House of Liu (劉) of Xiongnu descent
    - Northern Han (北漢(ㄅㄟˇ ㄏㄢˋ)) (AD 304–319)
    - Former Zhao (前趙(ㄑㄧㄢˊ ㄓㄠˋ)) (AD 319–329)
  - Cheng-Han (成漢(ㄔㄥˊ ㄏㄢˋ)) (AD 304–347) – Ruled by the House of Li (李) of Di descent
    - Chengdu (成都(ㄔㄥˊ ㄉㄨ)) (AD 304–306)
    - Cheng (成(ㄔㄥˊ)) (AD 306–338)
    - Han (漢(ㄏㄢˋ)) (AD 338–347)
  - Later Zhao (後趙(ㄏㄡˋ ㄓㄠˋ)) (AD 319–351) – Ruled by the House of Shi (石) of Jie descent
    - Wei (衛(ㄨㄟˋ)) (AD 350)
  - Former Liang (前涼(ㄑㄧㄢˊ ㄌㄧㄤˊ)) (AD 320–376) – Ruled by the House of Zhang (張) of Han descent
    - Xiping (西平(ㄒㄧ ㄆㄧㄥˊ)) (AD 324–353, AD 355, AD 361–376)
  - Former Yan (前燕(ㄑㄧㄢˊ ㄧㄢ)) (AD 337–370) – Ruled by the House of Murong (慕容) of Xianbei descent
  - Former Qin (前秦(ㄑㄧㄢˊ ㄑㄧㄣˊ)) (AD 351–394) – Ruled by the House of Fu (苻) of Di descent
  - Later Yan (後燕(ㄏㄡˋ ㄧㄢ)) (AD 384–409) – Ruled by the House of Murong (慕容) of Xianbei descent
  - Later Qin (後秦(ㄏㄡˋ ㄑㄧㄣˊ)) (AD 384–417) – Ruled by the House of Yao (姚) of Qiang descent
  - Western Qin (西秦(ㄒㄧ ㄑㄧㄣˊ)) (AD 385–400, AD 409–431) – Ruled by the House of Qifu (乞伏) of Xianbei descent
    - Yuanchuan (苑川(ㄩㄢˋ ㄔㄨㄢ)) (AD 387–388)
    - Henan (河南(ㄏㄜˊ ㄋㄢˊ)) (AD 388–389, AD 394, AD 411–414)
    - Jincheng (金城(ㄐㄧㄣ ㄔㄥˊ)) (AD 389–394)
    - Liang (梁(ㄌㄧㄤˊ)) (AD 394–395)
  - Later Liang (後涼(ㄏㄡˋ ㄌㄧㄤˊ)) (AD 386–403) – Ruled by the House of Lü (呂) of Di descent
    - Jiuquan (酒泉(ㄐㄧㄡˇ ㄑㄩㄢˊ)) (AD 386–389)
    - Sanhe (三河(ㄙㄢ ㄏㄜˊ)) (AD 389–396)
  - Southern Liang (南涼(ㄋㄢˊ ㄌㄧㄤˊ)) (AD 397–404, AD 408–414) – Ruled by the House of Tufa (禿髮) of Xianbei descent
    - Xiping (西平(ㄒㄧ ㄆㄧㄥˊ)) (AD 397–398)
    - Wuwei (武威(ㄨˇ ㄨㄟ)) (AD 398–401)
    - Hexi (河西(ㄏㄜˊ ㄒㄧ)) (AD 401–402)
  - Northern Liang (北涼(ㄅㄟˇ ㄌㄧㄤˊ)) (AD 397–439) – Ruled by the House of Juqu (沮渠) of Lushuihu descent
    - Jiankang (建康(ㄐㄧㄢˋ ㄎㄤ)) (AD 397–399)
    - Zhangye (張掖(ㄓㄤ ㄧㄝˋ)) (AD 401–412)
    - Hexi (河西(ㄏㄜˊ ㄒㄧ)) (AD 412–431, AD 433–439)
    - Northern Liang of Gaochang (高昌北涼(ㄍㄠ ㄔㄤ ㄅㄟˇ ㄌㄧㄤˊ)) (AD 442–460)
  - Southern Yan (南燕(ㄋㄢˊ ㄧㄢ)) (AD 398–410) – Ruled by the House of Murong (慕容) of Xianbei descent
  - Western Liang (西涼(ㄒㄧ ㄌㄧㄤˊ)) (AD 400–421) – Ruled by the House of Li (李) of Han descent
    - Later Western Liang (後西涼(ㄏㄡˋ ㄒㄧ ㄌㄧㄤˊ)) (AD 422–442)
  - Hu Xia (胡夏(ㄏㄨˊ ㄒㄧㄚˋ)) (AD 407–431) – Ruled by the House of Helian (赫連) of Xiongnu descent
  - Northern Yan (北燕(ㄅㄟˇ ㄧㄢ)) (AD 407–436) – Ruled by the House of Feng (馮) of Han descent
- Tuoba tribe (拓跋部(ㄊㄨㄛˋ ㄅㄚˊ ㄅㄨˋ)) (?–AD 310) – Ruled by the House of Tuoba (拓跋) of Xianbei descent
- Dai (代(ㄉㄞˋ)) (AD 310–376) – Ruled by the House of Tuoba (拓拔) of Xianbei descent
- Dingling state (丁零(ㄉㄧㄥ ㄌㄧㄥˊ)) (AD 330–388) – Ruled by the House of Zhai (翟) of Dingling descent
- Rouran Khaganate (柔然(ㄖㄡˊ ㄖㄢˊ)) (AD 330–555) – Ruled by the House of Yujiulü (郁久閭) of Rouran descent
- Cuan-shi (爨氏(ㄘㄨㄢˋ ㄕˋ)) (AD 330–580) – Ruled by the House of Cuan (爨) of Cuanman descent
  - Western Cuan (西爨(ㄒㄧ ㄘㄨㄢˋ)) (AD 580–786)
  - Eastern Cuan (東爨(ㄉㄨㄥ ㄘㄨㄢˋ)) (AD 672–748)
- Yuwen tribe (宇文部(ㄩˇ ㄨㄣˊ ㄅㄨˋ)) (?–AD 345) – Ruled by the House of Yuwen (宇文) of Xianbei descent
- Ran Wei (冉魏(ㄖㄢˇ ㄨㄟˋ)) (AD 350–352) – Ruled by the House of Ran (冉) of Han descent
- Western Yan (西燕(ㄒㄧ ㄧㄢ)) (AD 384–394) – Ruled by the House of Murong (慕容) of Xianbei descent
  - Jibei (濟北(ㄐㄧˇ ㄅㄟˇ)) (AD 384)
- Xianyu Zhao (鮮于趙(ㄒㄧㄢ ㄩˊ ㄓㄠˋ)) (AD 385) – Ruled by the House of Xianyu (鮮于)
- Northern and Southern dynasties (南北朝(ㄋㄢˊ ㄅㄟˇ ㄔㄠˊ)) (AD 386–589)
  - Northern dynasties (北朝(ㄅㄟˇ ㄔㄠˊ)) (AD 386–581)
    - Northern Wei (北魏(ㄅㄟˇ ㄨㄟˋ)) (AD 386–535) – Ruled by the House of Tuoba (拓跋) of Xianbei descent
      - Eastern Wei (東魏(ㄉㄨㄥ ㄨㄟˋ)) (AD 534–550)
      - Western Wei (西魏(ㄒㄧ ㄨㄟˋ)) (AD 535–557)
    - Northern Qi (北齊(ㄅㄟˇ ㄑㄧˊ)) (AD 550–577) – Ruled by the House of Gao (高) of Han descent
    - Northern Zhou (北周(ㄅㄟˇ ㄓㄡ)) (AD 557–581) – Ruled by the House of Yuwen (宇文) of Xianbei descent
  - Southern dynasties (南朝(ㄋㄢˊ ㄔㄠˊ)) (AD 420–589)
    - Liu Song (劉宋(ㄌㄧㄡˊ ㄙㄨㄥˋ)) (AD 420–479) – Ruled by the House of Liu (劉) of Han descent
    - Southern Qi (南齊(ㄋㄢˊ ㄑㄧˊ)) (AD 479–502) – Ruled by the House of Xiao (蕭) of Han descent
    - Liang dynasty (梁朝(ㄌㄧㄤˊ ㄔㄠˊ)) (AD 502–557) – Ruled by the House of Xiao (蕭) of Han descent
      - Western Liang (西梁(ㄒㄧ ㄌㄧㄤˊ)) (AD 555–587)
      - Eastern Liang (東梁(ㄉㄨㄥ ㄌㄧㄤˊ)) (AD 558–560)
    - Chen dynasty (陳朝(ㄔㄣˊ ㄔㄠˊ)) (AD 557–589) – Ruled by the House of Chen (陳) of Han descent
- Zhai Wei (翟魏(ㄓㄞˊ ㄨㄟˋ)) (AD 388–392) – Ruled by the House of Zhai (翟) of Dingling descent
- Southern Daifang (南帶方(ㄋㄢˊ ㄉㄞˋ ㄈㄤ)) (AD 4th century–5th century)
- Huan Chu (桓楚(ㄏㄨㄢˊ ㄔㄨˇ)) (AD 403–404) – Ruled by the House of Huan (桓) of Han descent
- Western Shu (西蜀(ㄒㄧ ㄕㄨˇ)) (AD 405–413) – Ruled by the House of Qiao (譙) of Han descent
- Tiefu tribe (鐵弗部(ㄊㄧㄝˇ ㄈㄨˊ ㄅㄨˋ)) (?–AD 407) – Ruled by the House of Liu (劉) of Xiongnu descent
- Northern Jin (北晉(ㄅㄟˇ ㄐㄧㄣˋ)) (AD 414–415) – Ruled by the House of Sima (司馬)
- Dynastic principalities under the Liu Song (劉宋藩王國(ㄌㄧㄡˊ ㄙㄨㄥˋ ㄈㄢ ㄨㄤˊ ㄍㄨㄛˊ)) (AD 420–479)
  - Agnatic dynastic principalities under the Liu Song (劉宋同姓藩王國(ㄌㄧㄡˊ ㄙㄨㄥˋ ㄊㄨㄥˊ ㄒㄧㄥˋ ㄈㄢ ㄨㄤˊ ㄍㄨㄛˊ)) (AD 420–479) – Ruled by the House of Liu (劉) of Han descent
    - Yidu (宜都(ㄧˊ ㄉㄨ)) (AD 420–424)
    - Pengcheng (彭城(ㄆㄥˊ ㄔㄥˊ)) (AD 420–445)
    - Luling (廬陵(ㄌㄨˊ ㄌㄧㄥˊ)) (AD 420–424, AD 426–477)
    - Changsha (長沙(ㄔㄤˊ ㄕㄚ)) (AD 420–479)
    - Linchuan (臨川(ㄌㄧㄣˊ ㄔㄨㄢ)) (AD 420–479)
    - Yingyang (營陽(ㄧㄥˊ ㄧㄤˊ)) (AD 424)
    - Jingling (竟陵(ㄐㄧㄥˋ ㄌㄧㄥˊ)) (AD 424–432, AD 453–459)
    - Jiangxia (江夏(ㄐㄧㄤ ㄒㄧㄚˋ)) (AD 424–479)
    - Hengyang (衡陽(ㄏㄥˊ ㄧㄤˊ)) (AD 424–479)
    - Nanqiao (南譙(ㄋㄢˊ ㄑㄧㄠˊ)) (AD 432–453)
    - Nanfeng (南豐(ㄋㄢˊ ㄈㄥ)) (AD 432–479)
    - Wuling (武陵(ㄨˇ ㄌㄧㄥˊ)) (AD 435–453, AD 470–479)
    - Shixing (始興(ㄕˇ ㄒㄧㄥ)) (AD 436–453)
    - Nanping (南平(ㄋㄢˊ ㄆㄧㄥˊ)) (AD 439–478)
    - Guangling (廣陵(ㄍㄨㄤˇ ㄌㄧㄥˊ)) (AD 443–449)
    - Jianping (建平(ㄐㄧㄢˋ ㄆㄧㄥˊ)) (AD 444–476)
    - Yiyang (義陽(ㄧˋ ㄧㄤˊ)) (AD 445–467)
    - Donghai (東海(ㄉㄨㄥ ㄏㄞˇ)) (AD 445–468)
    - Ruyin (汝陰(ㄖㄨˇ ㄧㄣ)) (AD 447–452)
    - Huaiyang (淮陽(ㄏㄨㄞˊ ㄧㄤˊ)) (AD 448–452)
    - Sui (隨(ㄙㄨㄟˊ)) (AD 449–453)
    - Wuchang (武昌(ㄨˇ ㄔㄤ)) (AD 452–455)
    - Xiangdong (湘東(ㄒㄧㄤ ㄉㄨㄥ)) (AD 452–465)
    - Jian'an (建安(ㄐㄧㄢˋ ㄢ)) (AD 452–471)
    - Nan (南(ㄋㄢˊ)) (AD 453–454)
    - Yiyang (宜陽(ㄧˊ ㄧㄤˊ)) (AD 453–454)
    - Dongping (東平(ㄉㄨㄥ ㄆㄧㄥˊ)) (AD 454–470)
    - Hailing (海陵(ㄏㄞˇ ㄌㄧㄥˊ)) (AD 455–461)
    - Shanyang (山陽(ㄕㄢ ㄧㄤˊ)) (AD 455–468)
    - Poyang (鄱陽(ㄆㄛˊ ㄧㄤˊ)) (AD 455–471)
    - Shunyang (順陽(ㄕㄨㄣˋ ㄧㄤˊ)) (AD 456–457)
    - Xiyang (西陽(ㄒㄧ ㄧㄤˊ)) (AD 456–461)
    - Baling (巴陵(ㄅㄚ ㄌㄧㄥˊ)) (AD 456–479)
    - Guiyang (桂陽(ㄍㄨㄟˋ ㄧㄤˊ)) (AD 457–474)
    - Anlu (安陸(ㄢ ㄌㄨˋ)) (AD 458–465)
    - Xiangyang (襄陽(ㄒㄧㄤ ㄧㄤˊ)) (AD 460)
    - Liyang (歷陽(ㄌㄧˋ ㄧㄤˊ)) (AD 460–461)
    - Jin'an (晉安(ㄐㄧㄣˋ ㄢ)) (AD 460–466)
    - Xunyang (尋陽(ㄒㄩㄣˊ ㄧㄤˊ)) (AD 460–466)
    - Xin'an (新安(ㄒㄧㄣ ㄢ)) (AD 460–467)
    - Yuzhang (豫章(ㄩˋ ㄓㄤ)) (AD 461–465)
    - Linhai (臨海(ㄌㄧㄣˊ ㄏㄞˇ)) (AD 461–466)
    - Yongjia (永嘉(ㄩㄥˇ ㄐㄧㄚ)) (AD 461–466)
    - Shi'an (始安(ㄕˇ ㄢ)) (AD 461–466, AD 471–476)
    - Jinling (晉陵(ㄐㄧㄣˋ ㄌㄧㄥˊ)) (AD 462)
    - Shaoling (邵陵(ㄕㄠˋ ㄌㄧㄥˊ)) (AD 462–466, AD 474–479)
    - Linhe (臨賀(ㄌㄧㄣˊ ㄏㄜˋ)) (AD 463–465)
    - Nanhai (南海(ㄋㄢˊ ㄏㄞˇ)) (AD 463–465)
    - Huainan (淮南(ㄏㄨㄞˊ ㄋㄢˊ)) (AD 463–466)
    - Ancheng (安成(ㄢ ㄔㄥˊ)) (AD 466, AD 471–477)
    - Jinxi (晉熙(ㄐㄧㄣˋ ㄒㄧ)) (AD 467–479)
    - Shiping (始平(ㄕˇ ㄆㄧㄥˊ)) (AD 467–479)
    - Lujiang (廬江(ㄌㄨˊ ㄐㄧㄤ)) (AD 468–469)
    - Jinping (晉平(ㄐㄧㄣˋ ㄆㄧㄥˊ)) (AD 468–471)
    - Linqing (臨慶(ㄌㄧㄣˊ ㄑㄧㄥˋ)) (AD 470–471)
    - Nanyang (南陽(ㄋㄢˊ ㄧㄤˊ)) (AD 476–478)
    - Xinxing (新興(ㄒㄧㄣ ㄒㄧㄥ)) (AD 476–479)
    - Shijian (始建(ㄕˇ ㄐㄧㄢˋ)) (AD 476–479)
    - Suiyang (隨陽(ㄙㄨㄟˊ ㄧㄤˊ)) (AD 478–479)
  - Non-agnatic dynastic principalities under the Liu Song (劉宋異姓藩王國(ㄌㄧㄡˊ ㄙㄨㄥˋ ㄧˋ ㄒㄧㄥˋ ㄈㄢ ㄨㄤˊ ㄍㄨㄛˊ)) (AD 420–479)
    - Lingling (零陵(ㄌㄧㄥˊ ㄌㄧㄥˊ)) (AD 420–479) – Ruled by the House of Sima (司馬) of Han descent
    - Chenliu (陳留(ㄔㄣˊ ㄌㄧㄡˊ)) (AD 421–479) – Ruled by the House of Cao (曹) of Han descent
    - Qi (齊(ㄑㄧˊ)) (AD 479) – Ruled by the House of Xiao (蕭) of Han descent
- Yifu Wudi (乙弗勿敵(ㄧˇ ㄈㄨˊ ㄨˋ ㄉㄧˊ)) (?–AD 429) – Ruled by the House of Yifu (乙弗) of Xianbei descent
- Dengzhi (鄧至(ㄉㄥˋ ㄓˋ)) (AD 430–554) – Ruled by the House of Xiang (像) of Qiang descent
- Gaochang (高昌(ㄍㄠ ㄔㄤ)) (AD 460–640)
  - Gaochang of Kan-shi (闞氏高昌(ㄎㄢˋ ㄕˋ ㄍㄠ ㄔㄤ)) (AD 460–488) – Ruled by the House of Kan (闞)
  - Gaochang of Zhang-shi (張氏高昌(ㄓㄤ ㄕˋ ㄍㄠ ㄔㄤ)) (AD 488–496) – Ruled by the House of Zhang (張) of Han descent
  - Gaochang of Ma-shi (馬氏高昌(ㄇㄚˇ ㄕˋ ㄍㄠ ㄔㄤ)) (AD 496–501) – Ruled by the House of Ma (馬)
- Dynastic principalities under the Southern Qi (南齊藩王國(ㄋㄢˊ ㄑㄧˊ ㄈㄢ ㄨㄤˊ ㄍㄨㄛˊ)) (AD 479–502)
  - Agnatic dynastic principalities under the Southern Qi (南齊同姓藩王國(ㄋㄢˊ ㄑㄧˊ ㄊㄨㄥˊ ㄒㄧㄥˋ ㄈㄢ ㄨㄤˊ ㄍㄨㄛˊ)) (AD 479–502) – Ruled by the House of Xiao (蕭) of Han descent
    - Nan (南(ㄋㄢˊ)) (AD 479–493, ?–AD 498)
    - Guiyang (桂陽(ㄍㄨㄟˋ ㄧㄤˊ)) (AD 479–494, AD 495–498, ?–AD 502)
    - Shi'an (始安(ㄕˇ ㄢ)) (AD 479–502)
    - Yuzhang (豫章(ㄩˋ ㄓㄤ)) (AD 479–502)
    - Linchuan (臨川(ㄌㄧㄣˊ ㄔㄨㄢ)) (AD 479–502)
    - Changsha (長沙(ㄔㄤˊ ㄕㄚ)) (AD 479–502)
    - Wuling (武陵(ㄨˇ ㄌㄧㄥˊ)) (AD 479–502)
    - Ancheng (安成(ㄢ ㄔㄥˊ)) (AD 479–502)
    - Hengyang (衡陽(ㄏㄥˊ ㄧㄤˊ)) (AD 479–494, AD 495–502)
    - Poyang (鄱陽(ㄆㄛˊ ㄧㄤˊ)) (AD 479–494, AD 501–502)
    - Guangxing (廣興(ㄍㄨㄤˇ ㄒㄧㄥ)) (AD 479–?)
    - Jiangxia (江夏(ㄐㄧㄤ ㄒㄧㄚˋ)) (AD 481–500)
    - Anlu (安陸(ㄢ ㄌㄨˋ)) (AD 482–499)
    - Jingling (竟陵(ㄐㄧㄥˋ ㄌㄧㄥˊ)) (AD 482–499)
    - Sui (随(ㄙㄨㄟˊ)) (AD 482–499)
    - Jian'an (建安(ㄐㄧㄢˋ ㄢ)) (AD 482–501)
    - Luling (廬陵(ㄌㄨˊ ㄌㄧㄥˊ)) (AD 482–502)
    - Jin'an (晉安(ㄐㄧㄣˋ ㄢ)) (AD 482–502)
    - Wuchang (武昌(ㄨˇ ㄔㄤ)) (AD 483–485)
    - Yidu (宜都(ㄧˊ ㄉㄨ)) (AD 483–494)
    - Nanping (南平(ㄋㄢˊ ㄆㄧㄥˊ)) (AD 483–495)
    - Nanhai (南海(ㄋㄢˊ ㄏㄞˇ)) (AD 483–495)
    - Baling (巴陵(ㄅㄚ ㄌㄧㄥˊ)) (AD 484–494, AD 495–498, AD 499–502)
    - Xiyang (西陽(ㄒㄧ ㄧㄤˊ)) (AD 485–498)
    - Hedong (河東(ㄏㄜˊ ㄉㄨㄥ)) (AD 486–498)
    - Jinxi (晉熙(ㄐㄧㄣˋ ㄒㄧ)) (AD 486–494, ?–AD 502)
    - Shaoling (邵陵(ㄕㄠˋ ㄌㄧㄥˊ)) (AD 486–502)
    - Badong (巴東(ㄅㄚ ㄉㄨㄥ)) (AD 488–490)
    - Shu (蜀(ㄕㄨˇ)) (AD 489–495)
    - Guanghan (廣漢(ㄍㄨㄤˇ ㄏㄢˋ)) (AD 489–495)
    - Yongyang (永陽(ㄩㄥˇ ㄧㄤˊ)) (AD 489–498)
    - Linhe (臨賀(ㄌㄧㄣˊ ㄏㄜˋ)) (AD 489–498)
    - Xuancheng (宣城(ㄒㄩㄢ ㄔㄥˊ)) (AD 489–490, AD 494, AD 500–501)
    - Yi'an (義安(ㄧˋ ㄢ)) (AD 489–?)
    - Nankang (南康(ㄋㄢˊ ㄎㄤ)) (AD 490–498, AD 499–500)
    - Xiangdong (湘東(ㄒㄧㄤ ㄉㄨㄥ)) (AD 490–498, AD 499–502)
    - Xin'an (新安(ㄒㄧㄣ ㄢ)) (AD 493–494)
    - Linhai (臨海(ㄌㄧㄣˊ ㄏㄞˇ)) (AD 493–495)
    - Yongjia (永嘉(ㄩㄥˇ ㄐㄧㄚ)) (AD 493–495)
    - Hailing (海陵(ㄏㄞˇ ㄌㄧㄥˊ)) (AD 494)
    - Shixing (始興(ㄕˇ ㄒㄧㄥ)) (?–AD 502)
    - Liang (梁(ㄌㄧㄤˊ)) (AD 502)
  - Non-agnatic dynastic principalities under the Southern Qi (南齊異姓藩王國(ㄋㄢˊ ㄑㄧˊ ㄧˋ ㄒㄧㄥˋ ㄈㄢ ㄨㄤˊ ㄍㄨㄛˊ)) (AD 479–502)
    - Lingling (零陵(ㄌㄧㄥˊ ㄌㄧㄥˊ)) (AD 479–502) – Ruled by the House of Sima (司馬) of Han descent
    - Ruyin (汝陰(ㄖㄨˇ ㄧㄣ)) (AD 479–502) – Ruled by the House of Liu (劉) of Han descent
- Gaoche (高車(ㄍㄠ ㄔㄜ)) (AD 487–541) – Ruled by the House of Fufuluo (副伏羅) of Tiele descent

==== Middle Ages ====
- Gaochang of Qu-shi (麴氏高昌(ㄑㄩ ㄕˋ ㄍㄠ ㄔㄤ)) (AD 501–640) – Ruled by the House of Qu (麴) of Han descent
- Dynastic principalities under the Liang dynasty (梁朝藩王國(ㄌㄧㄤˊ ㄔㄠˊ ㄈㄢ ㄨㄤˊ ㄍㄨㄛˊ)) (AD 502–?)
  - Agnatic dynastic principalities under the Liang dynasty (梁朝同姓藩王國(ㄌㄧㄤˊ ㄔㄠˊ ㄊㄨㄥˊ ㄒㄧㄥˋ ㄈㄢ ㄨㄤˊ ㄍㄨㄛˊ)) (AD 502–?) – Ruled by the House of Xiao (蕭) of Han descent
    - Linchuan (臨川(ㄌㄧㄣˊ ㄔㄨㄢ)) (AD 502–?, AD 550–557)
    - Changsha (長沙(ㄔㄤˊ ㄕㄚ)) (AD 503–557)
    - Yongyang (永陽(ㄩㄥˇ ㄧㄤˊ)) (AD 503–?)
    - Hengyang (衡陽(ㄏㄥˊ ㄧㄤˊ)) (AD 504–?)
    - Guiyang (桂陽(ㄍㄨㄟˋ ㄧㄤˊ)) (AD 504–549, AD 550–557)
- Hou Han (侯漢(ㄏㄡˊ ㄏㄢˋ)) (AD 551–552) – Ruled by the House of Hou (侯) of Jie descent
- First Turkic Khaganate (突厥汗國(ㄊㄨ ㄐㄩㄝˊ ㄏㄢˊ ㄍㄨㄛˊ)) (AD 552–581) – Ruled by the House of Ashina (阿史那) of Göktürk descent
  - Eastern Turkic Khaganate (東突厥(ㄉㄨㄥ ㄊㄨ ㄐㄩㄝˊ)) (AD 581–630)
    - Later Eastern Turkic Khaganate (後東突厥(ㄏㄡˋ ㄉㄨㄥ ㄊㄨ ㄐㄩㄝˊ)) (AD 639–681)
  - Western Turkic Khaganate (西突厥(ㄒㄧ ㄊㄨ ㄐㄩㄝˊ)) (AD 581–657)
    - Xingxiwang Khaganate of Left Wing (左廂興昔亡汗國(ㄗㄨㄛˇ ㄒㄧㄤ ㄒㄧㄥ ㄒㄧ ㄨㄤˊ ㄏㄢˊ ㄍㄨㄛˊ)) (AD 657–736)
    - Jiwangjue Khaganate of Right Wing (右廂繼往絕汗國(ㄧㄡˋ ㄒㄧㄤ ㄐㄧˋ ㄨㄤˇ ㄐㄩㄝˊ ㄏㄢˊ ㄍㄨㄛˊ)) (AD 657–742)
- Möng Mao (勐卯(ㄇㄥˇ ㄇㄠˇ)) (AD 560–1604)
  - Hunlu–Hunlai dynasty (混魯混賴王朝(ㄏㄨㄣˋ ㄌㄨˇ ㄏㄨㄣˋ ㄌㄞˋ ㄨㄤˊ ㄔㄠˊ)) (?–?)
  - Hundeng dynasty (混等王朝(ㄏㄨㄣˋ ㄉㄥˇ ㄨㄤˊ ㄔㄠˊ)) (?–?)
  - Yalu dynasty (雅魯王朝(ㄏㄨㄣˋ ㄉㄥˇ ㄨㄤˊ ㄔㄠˊ)) (AD 954–1330)
  - Si-shi dynasty (思氏王朝(ㄙ ㄕˋ ㄨㄤˊ ㄔㄠˊ)) (AD 1335–?) – Ruled by the House of Si (思) of Dai descent
- Tanchang (宕昌(ㄊㄢˋ ㄔㄤ)) (?–AD 564) – Ruled by the House of Liang (梁) of Qiang descent
- Sui dynasty (隋朝(ㄙㄨㄟˊ ㄔㄠˊ)) (AD 581–619) – Ruled by the House of Yang (楊) of Han descent
- Chiefdom of Sizhou (思州土司(ㄙ ㄓㄡ ㄊㄨˇ ㄙ)) (AD 582–1413) – Ruled by the House of Tian (田)
  - Chiefdom of Sinan (思南土司(ㄙ ㄋㄢˊ ㄊㄨˇ ㄙ)) (AD 1364–1414)
- Eastern Queendom (東女國(ㄉㄨㄥ ㄋㄩˇ ㄍㄨㄛˊ)) (AD 6th century–8th century)
- Bolü (勃律(ㄅㄛˊ ㄌㄩˋ)) (AD 6th century–8th century)
  - Lesser Bolü (小勃律(ㄒㄧㄠˇ ㄅㄛˊ ㄌㄩˋ)) (AD 7th century–8th century)
  - Greater Bolü (大勃律(ㄉㄚˋ ㄅㄛˊ ㄌㄩˋ)) (AD 7th century–8th century)
- Xueyantuo (薛延陀(ㄒㄩㄝ ㄧㄢˊ ㄊㄨㄛˊ)) (AD 605–646) – Ruled by the House of Yilidie (壹利咥) of Xueyantuo descent
- Lin Chu (林楚(ㄌㄧㄣˊ ㄔㄨˇ)) (AD 616–622) – Ruled by the House of Lin (林) of Han descent
- Xia (夏(ㄒㄧㄚˋ)) (AD 617–621) – Ruled by the House of Dou (竇) of Han descent
- Later Western Liang (後西梁(ㄏㄡˋ ㄒㄧ ㄌㄧㄤˊ)) (AD 617–621) – Ruled by the House of Xiao (蕭) of Han descent
- Liang (梁(ㄌㄧㄤˊ)) (AD 617–628) – Ruled by the House of Liang (梁) of Han descent
- Liang (涼(ㄌㄧㄤˊ)) (AD 618–619) – Ruled by the House of Li (李) of Han descent
- Xu (許(ㄒㄩˇ)) (AD 618–619) – Ruled by the House of Yuwen (宇文) of Xiongnu descent
- Tibetan Empire (吐蕃(ㄊㄨˇ ㄅㄛ)) (AD 618–842) – Ruled by the House of sPu-rgyal (悉補野) of Tibetan descent
- Tang dynasty (唐朝(ㄊㄤˊ ㄔㄠˊ)) (AD 618–690, AD 705–907) – Ruled by the House of Li (李) of Han descent
  - Wu Zhou (武周(ㄨˇ ㄓㄡ)) (AD 690–705) – Interrupted the Tang dynasty; Ruled by the House of Wu (武) of Han descent
- Zheng (鄭(ㄓㄥˋ)) (AD 619–621) – Ruled by the House of Wang (王)
- Wu (吳(ㄨˊ)) (AD 619–621) – Ruled by the House of Li (李)
- Later Sui (後隋(ㄏㄡˋ ㄙㄨㄟˊ)) (AD 620–630) – Ruled by the House of Yang (楊) of Han descent
- Tokhara Yabghu State (吐火羅葉護國(ㄊㄨˇ ㄏㄨㄛˇ ㄌㄨㄛˊ ㄧㄝˋ ㄏㄨˋ ㄍㄨㄛˊ)) (AD 625–758) – Ruled by the House of Ashina (阿史那) of Göktürk descent
- Tangmao (唐旄(ㄊㄤˊ ㄇㄠˊ)) (?–AD 632)
- Pugu tribe (僕固部(ㄆㄨˊ ㄍㄨˋ ㄅㄨˋ)) (AD 647–765) – Ruled by the House of Pugu (僕固) of Tiele descent
- Second Turkic Khaganate (後突厥(ㄏㄡˋ ㄊㄨ ㄐㄩㄝˊ)) (AD 682–745) – Ruled by the House of Ashina (阿史那) of Göktürk descent
- Balhae (渤海(ㄅㄛˊ ㄏㄞˇ)) (AD 698–926) – Ruled by the House of Dae (大) of Mohe or Goguryeo descent
  - Zhen (振(ㄓㄣˋ)) (AD 698–713)
- Türgesh Khaganate (突騎施(ㄊㄨ ㄑㄧˊ ㄕ)) (AD 699–766)
- Little Gaogouli (小高句麗(ㄒㄧㄠˇ ㄍㄠ ㄍㄡ ㄌㄧˊ)) (AD 699–820) – Hypothesized
- Wuluohun (烏羅渾(ㄨ ㄌㄨㄛˊ ㄏㄨㄣˊ)) (?–AD 7th century)
- Dahe-shi (大賀氏(ㄉㄚˋ ㄏㄜˋ ㄕˋ)) (?–AD 730) – Ruled by the House of Dahe (大賀) of Khitan descent
- Yaonian-shi (遙輦氏(ㄧㄠˊ ㄋㄧㄢˇ ㄕˋ)) (AD 730–906) – Ruled by the House of Yaonian (遙輦) of Khitan descent
- Basmyl Khaganate (拔悉密汗國(ㄅㄚˊ ㄒㄧ ㄇㄧˋ ㄏㄢˊ ㄍㄨㄛˊ)) (AD 742–744) – Ruled by the House of Ashina (阿史那) of Göktürk descent
- Uyghur Khaganate (回鶻汗國(ㄏㄨㄟˊ ㄏㄨˊ ㄏㄢˊ ㄍㄨㄛˊ)) (AD 744–840) – Ruled by the House of Yaglakar (藥羅葛) of Uyghur descent and the House of Ädiz (阿跌) of Tiele descent
- Yan (燕(ㄧㄢ)) (AD 756–763)
  - Former Yan (前燕(ㄑㄧㄢˊ ㄧㄢ)) (AD 756–759) – Ruled by the House of An (安) of Sogdian descent
  - Later Yan (後燕(ㄏㄡˋ ㄧㄢ)) (AD 759–763) – Ruled by the House of Shi (史) of Göktürk descent
- Karluk Yabghu State (葛邏祿葉護國(ㄍㄜˊ ㄌㄨㄛˊ ㄌㄨˋ ㄧㄝˋ ㄏㄨˋ ㄍㄨㄛˊ)) (AD 756–840) – Ruled by the House of Ashina (阿史那) of Göktürk descent
- Ji (冀(ㄐㄧˋ)) (AD 782–784) – Ruled by the House of Zhu (朱) of Han descent
- Chu (楚(ㄔㄨˇ)) (AD 784–786) – Ruled by the House of Li (李) of Han descent
- Eight Zhao (八詔(ㄅㄚ ㄓㄠˋ)) (?–AD 794, AD 738–902)
  - Six Zhao (六詔(ㄌㄧㄡˋ ㄓㄠˋ)) (?–AD 794)
    - Mengxi Zhao (蒙巂詔(ㄇㄥˊ ㄒㄧ ㄓㄠˋ)) (?–AD 730)
    - Mengshe Zhao (蒙舍詔(ㄇㄥˊ ㄕㄜˇ ㄓㄠˋ)) (?–AD 738) – Ruled by the House of Meng (蒙) of Wuman descent
      - Nanzhao (南詔(ㄋㄢˊ ㄓㄠˋ)) (AD 738–902)
        - Dameng (大蒙(ㄉㄚˋ ㄇㄥˊ)) (AD 738–860)
        - Dali (大禮(ㄉㄚˋ ㄌㄧˇ)) (AD 860–877)
        - Dafengmin (大封民(ㄉㄚˋ ㄈㄥ ㄇㄧㄣˊ)) (AD 878–902)
    - Yuexi Zhao (越析詔(ㄩㄝˋ ㄒㄧ ㄓㄠˋ)) (?–AD 747)
    - Shilang Zhao (施浪詔(ㄕ ㄌㄤˋ ㄓㄠˋ)) (?–AD 794)
    - Langqiong Zhao (浪穹詔(ㄌㄤˋ ㄑㄩㄥˊ ㄓㄠˋ)) (?–AD 794)
    - Tengdan Zhao (邆賧詔(ㄊㄥˊ ㄉㄢˇ ㄓㄠˋ)) (?–AD 794)
  - Shibang Zhao (時傍詔(ㄕˊ ㄅㄤˋ ㄓㄠˋ)) (?–?)
  - Yichuanluoshi Zhao (矣川羅識詔(ㄧˇ ㄔㄨㄢ ㄌㄨㄛˊ ㄕˊ ㄓㄠˋ)) (?–?)
- Kepantuo (渴盤陀(ㄎㄜˇ ㄆㄢˊ ㄊㄨㄛˊ)) (?–AD 8th century)
- Tatar confederation (塔塔兒部(ㄊㄚˇ ㄊㄚˇ ㄦˊ ㄅㄨˋ)) (AD 8th century–1202)
- Yenisei Kyrgyz Khaganate (黠戛斯汗國(ㄒㄧㄚˊ ㄐㄧㄚˊ ㄙ ㄏㄢˊ ㄍㄨㄛˊ)) (AD 840–1207) – Ruled by the House of Ajo (阿熱) of Yenisei Kyrgyz descent
- Kara-Khanid Khanate (喀喇汗國(ㄎㄚ ㄌㄚˇ ㄏㄢˊ ㄍㄨㄛˊ)) (AD 840–1212)
  - Eastern Kara-Khanid (東喀喇汗國(ㄉㄨㄥ ㄎㄚ ㄌㄚˇ ㄏㄢˊ ㄍㄨㄛˊ)) (AD 1032–1210)
  - Western Kara-Khanid (西喀喇汗國(ㄒㄧ ㄎㄚ ㄌㄚˇ ㄏㄢˊ ㄍㄨㄛˊ)) (AD 1041–1212)
- Qocho Uyghur Kingdom (高昌回鶻(ㄍㄠ ㄔㄤ ㄏㄨㄟˊ ㄏㄨˊ)) (AD 843–1360)
- Guiyi Circuit (歸義軍(ㄍㄨㄟ ㄧˋ ㄐㄩㄣ)) (AD 851–1036) – Ruled by the House of Zhang (張) of Han descent and the House of Cao (曹)
  - Xihan Jinshan (西漢金山(ㄒㄧ ㄏㄢˋ ㄐㄧㄣ ㄕㄢ)) (AD 910–?)
  - Xihan Dunhuang (西漢敦煌(ㄒㄧ ㄏㄢˋ ㄉㄨㄣ ㄏㄨㄤˊ)) (?–AD 914)
- Wamo (嗢末(ㄨㄚˋ ㄇㄛˋ)) (AD 863–960) – Ruled by the House of Lun (論) of Tibetan descent
- Chiefdom of Bozhou (播州土司(ㄅㄛ ㄓㄡ ㄊㄨˇ ㄙ)) (AD 876–1600) – Ruled by the House of Yang (楊) of Yi descent
- Era of Fragmentation of Tibet (吐蕃分裂時期(ㄊㄨˇ ㄅㄛ ㄈㄣ ㄌㄧㄝˋ ㄕˊ ㄑㄧ)) (AD 877–1264)
  - Lhachen dynasty (拉達克王系(ㄌㄚ ㄉㄚˊ ㄎㄜˋ ㄨㄤˊ ㄒㄧˋ)) (AD 930–1460)
  - Guge dynasty (古格王系(ㄍㄨˇ ㄍㄜˊ ㄨㄤˊ ㄒㄧˋ)) (AD 967–1635) – Ruled by the House of sPu-rgyal (悉補野) of Tibetan descent
    - Purang-Guge Kingdom (普蘭-古格王國(ㄆㄨˇ ㄌㄢˊ ㄍㄨˇ ㄍㄜˊ ㄨㄤˊ ㄍㄨㄛˊ)) (?–?)
  - Yatse dynasty (亞澤王系(ㄧㄚˋ ㄗㄜˊ ㄨㄤˊ ㄒㄧˋ)) (AD 12th century–1801)
  - Lhasa dynasty (拉薩王系(ㄌㄚ ㄙㄚˋ ㄨㄤˊ ㄒㄧˋ)) (?–?)
  - Yarlung dynasty (雅隆覺阿王系(ㄧㄚˇ ㄌㄨㄥˊ ㄐㄩㄝˊ ㄚ ㄨㄤˊ ㄒㄧˋ)) (?–?) – Ruled by the House of sPu-rgyal (悉補野) of Tibetan descent
  - Puhrang dynasty (普蘭王系(ㄆㄨˇ ㄌㄢˊ ㄨㄤˊ ㄒㄧˋ)) (?–?) – Ruled by the House of sPu-rgyal (悉補野) of Tibetan descent
  - Gungthang dynasty (貢塘王系(ㄍㄨㄥˋ ㄊㄤˊ ㄨㄤˊ ㄒㄧˋ)) (?–?) – Ruled by the House of sPu-rgyal (悉補野) of Tibetan descent
  - Lhagyari dynasty (拉加里王系(ㄌㄚ ㄐㄧㄚ ㄌㄧˇ ㄨㄤˊ ㄒㄧˋ)) (?–?)
- Huang Qi (黃齊(ㄏㄨㄤˊ ㄑㄧˊ)) (AD 881–884) – Ruled by the House of Huang (黃) of Han descent
- Ganzhou Uyghur Kingdom (甘州回鶻(ㄍㄢ ㄓㄡ ㄏㄨㄟˊ ㄏㄨˊ)) (AD 894–1036) – Ruled by the House of Yaglakar (藥羅葛) of Uyghur descent
- Kucha Uyghur Kingdom (龜茲回鶻(ㄑㄧㄡ ㄘˊ ㄏㄨㄟˊ ㄏㄨˊ)) (AD 9th century–11th century)
- Qi (岐(ㄑㄧˊ)) (AD 901–924) – Ruled by the House of Li (李) of Han descent
- Later Three Dynasties of Yunnan (雲南後三朝(ㄩㄣˊ ㄋㄢˊ ㄏㄡˋ ㄙㄢ ㄔㄠˊ)) (AD 902–937)
  - Dachanghe (大長和(ㄉㄚˋ ㄔㄤˊ ㄏㄜˊ)) (AD 902–928) – Ruled by the House of Zheng (鄭) of Han descent
  - Datianxing (大天興(ㄉㄚˋ ㄊㄧㄢ ㄒㄧㄥ)) (AD 928–929) – Ruled by the House of Zhao (趙)
  - Dayining (大義寧(ㄉㄚˋ ㄧˋ ㄋㄧㄥˊ)) (AD 929–937) – Ruled by the House of Yang (楊) of Han descent
- Liugu tribe (六谷部(ㄌㄧㄡˋ ㄍㄨˇ ㄅㄨˋ)) (AD 906–1016) – Ruled by the House of Zhebu (折逋) of Tibetan descent
- Shatuo tribe (沙陀部(ㄕㄚ ㄊㄨㄛˊ ㄅㄨˋ)) (?–AD 907) – Ruled by the House of Zhuye (朱邪) of Shatuo descent
- Zhao (趙(ㄓㄠˋ)) (AD 907–921) – Ruled by the House of Wang (王) of Uyghur descent
- Five Dynasties and Ten Kingdoms (五代十國(ㄨˇ ㄉㄞˋ ㄕˊ ㄍㄨㄛˊ)) (AD 907–979)
  - Five Dynasties (五代(ㄨˇ ㄉㄞˋ)) (AD 907–960)
    - Later Liang (後梁(ㄏㄡˋ ㄌㄧㄤˊ)) (AD 907–923) – Ruled by the House of Zhu (朱) of Han descent
    - Later Tang (後唐(ㄏㄡˋ ㄊㄤˊ)) (AD 923–937) – Ruled by the House of Li (李) of Shatuo descent
      - Former Jin (前晉(ㄑㄧㄢˊ ㄐㄧㄣˋ)) (AD 907–923)
      - Li Liang (李梁(ㄌㄧˇ ㄌㄧㄤˊ)) (AD 946–947)
    - Later Jin (後晉(ㄏㄡˋ ㄐㄧㄣˋ)) (AD 936–947) – Ruled by the House of Shi (石) of Shatuo descent
    - Later Han (後漢(ㄏㄡˋ ㄏㄢˋ)) (AD 947–951) – Ruled by the House of Liu (劉) of Shatuo descent
    - Later Zhou (後周(ㄏㄡˋ ㄓㄡ)) (AD 951–960) – Ruled by the House of Guo (郭) of Han descent
  - Ten Kingdoms (十國(ㄕˊ ㄍㄨㄛˊ)) (AD 907–979)
    - Former Shu (前蜀(ㄑㄧㄢˊ ㄕㄨˇ)) (AD 907–925) – Ruled by the House of Wang (王) of Han descent
      - Han (漢(ㄏㄢˋ)) (AD 917–918)
    - Yang Wu (楊吳(ㄧㄤˊ ㄨˊ)) (AD 907–937) – Ruled by the House of Yang (楊) of Han descent
      - Hongnong (弘農(ㄏㄨㄥˊ ㄋㄨㄥˊ)) (AD 905–910)
    - Ma Chu (馬楚(ㄇㄚˇ ㄔㄨˇ)) (AD 907–951) – Ruled by the House of Ma (馬) of Han descent
    - Wuyue (吳越(ㄨˊ ㄩㄝˋ)) (AD 907–978) – Ruled by the House of Qian (錢) of Han descent
    - Min (閩(ㄇㄧㄣˇ)) (AD 909–945) – Ruled by the House of Wang (王) of Han descent
      - Yin (殷(ㄧㄣ)) (AD 943–945)
    - Southern Han (南漢(ㄋㄢˊ ㄏㄢˋ)) (AD 917–971) – Ruled by the House of Liu (劉) of Han descent
      - Yue (越(ㄩㄝˋ)) (AD 917)
    - Jingnan (荊南(ㄐㄧㄥ ㄋㄢˊ)) (AD 924–963) – Ruled by the House of Gao (高) of Han descent
      - Bohai (渤海(ㄅㄛˊ ㄏㄞˇ)) (AD 913–924, AD 932–934)
      - Nanping (南平(ㄋㄢˊ ㄆㄧㄥˊ)) (AD 924–929, AD 934–960)
    - Later Shu (後蜀(ㄏㄡˋ ㄕㄨˇ)) (AD 934–965) – Ruled by the House of Meng (孟) of Han descent
    - Southern Tang (南唐(ㄋㄢˊ ㄊㄤˊ)) (AD 937–976) – Ruled by the House of Li (李) of Han descent
      - Xu Qi (徐齊(ㄒㄩˊ ㄑㄧˊ)) (AD 937–939)
      - Jiangnan (江南(ㄐㄧㄤ ㄋㄢˊ)) (AD 971–976)
    - Northern Han (北漢(ㄅㄟˇ ㄏㄢˋ)) (AD 951–979) – Ruled by the House of Liu (劉) of Shatuo descent
- Beiping (北平(ㄅㄟˇ ㄆㄧㄥˊ)) (AD 909–929) – Ruled by the House of Wang (王) of Han descent
- Yan (燕(ㄧㄢ)) (AD 911–913) – Ruled by the House of Liu (劉) of Han descent
- Liao dynasty (遼朝(ㄌㄧㄠˊ ㄔㄠˊ)) (AD 916–1125) – Ruled by the House of Yelü (耶律) of Khitan descent
  - Northern Liao (北遼(ㄅㄟˇ ㄌㄧㄠˊ)) (AD 1122–1123)
  - Northwestern Liao (西北遼(ㄒㄧ ㄅㄟˇ ㄌㄧㄠˊ)) (AD 1123)
  - Western Liao (西遼(ㄒㄧ ㄌㄧㄠˊ)) (AD 1124–1218)
- Dongdan (東丹(ㄉㄨㄥ ㄉㄢ)) (AD 926–936) – Ruled by the House of Yelü (耶律) of Khitan descent
- Later Bohai (後渤海(ㄏㄡˋ ㄅㄛˊ ㄏㄞˇ)) (AD 928–976) – Ruled by the House of Da (大) of Goguryeo or Mohe descent
- Dali (大理(ㄉㄚˋ ㄌㄧˇ)) (AD 937–1094, AD 1096–1253) – Ruled by the House of Duan (段) of Baiman descent
  - Former Dali (前大理(ㄑㄧㄢˊ ㄉㄚˋ ㄌㄧˇ)) (AD 937–1094)
  - Later Dali (後大理(ㄏㄡˋ ㄉㄚˋ ㄌㄧˇ)) (AD 1096–1253)
  - Dali Chief Steward (大理總管(ㄉㄚˋ ㄌㄧˇ ㄗㄨㄥˇ ㄍㄨㄢˇ)) (AD 1257–1382)
- Jeongan (定安(ㄉㄧㄥˋ ㄢ)) (AD 938–986) – Ruled by the House of Yeol (烈) and the House of Oh (烏)
- Song dynasty (宋朝(ㄙㄨㄥˋ ㄔㄠˊ)) (AD 960–1279) – Ruled by the House of Zhao (趙) of Han descent
  - Northern Song (北宋(ㄅㄟˇ ㄙㄨㄥˋ)) (AD 960–1127)
  - Southern Song (南宋(ㄋㄢˊ ㄙㄨㄥˋ)) (AD 1127–1279)
- Chiefdom of Shuidong (水東土司(ㄕㄨㄟˇ ㄉㄨㄥ ㄊㄨˇ ㄙ)) (AD 975–1630) – Ruled by the House of Song (宋)
- Restored Bohai (再興渤海(ㄗㄞˋ ㄒㄧㄥ ㄅㄛˊ ㄏㄞˇ)) (AD 979–1018) – Ruled by the House of Da (大) of Goguryeo or Mohe descent
- Li Shu (李蜀(ㄌㄧˇ ㄕㄨˇ)) (AD 994) – Ruled by the House of Li (李) of Han descent
- Wure (兀惹(ㄨˋ ㄖㄜˇ)) (AD 995–996) – Ruled by the House of Wu (烏)
- Five Nations (五國部(ㄨˇ ㄍㄨㄛˊ ㄅㄨˋ)) (AD 1003–?)
  - Pou'ali (剖阿里(ㄆㄡ ㄚ ㄌㄧˇ)) (?–?)
  - Aolimi (奧里米(ㄠˋ ㄌㄧˇ ㄇㄧˇ)) (?–?)
  - Yuelidu (越里篤(ㄩㄝˋ ㄌㄧˇ ㄉㄨˇ)) (?–?)
  - Pennuli (盆奴里(ㄆㄣˊ ㄋㄨˊ ㄌㄧˇ)) (?–?)
  - Yueliji (越里吉(ㄩㄝˋ ㄌㄧˇ ㄐㄧˊ)) (?–?)
- Xingliao (興遼(ㄒㄧㄥ ㄌㄧㄠˊ)) (AD 1029–1030) – Ruled by the House of Da (大) of Mohe descent
- Changqi (長其(ㄔㄤˊ ㄑㄧˊ)) (AD 1029–1055) – Ruled by the House of Nungz (儂) of Zhuang descent
  - Dali (大歷(ㄉㄚˋ ㄌㄧˋ)) (AD 1041–1045)
  - Nantian (南天(ㄋㄢˊ ㄊㄧㄢ)) (AD 1045–1052)
  - Danan (大南(ㄉㄚˋ ㄋㄢˊ)) (AD 1052–1055)
- Tsongkha (唃廝囉國(ㄍㄨ ㄙ ㄌㄨㄛˊ ㄍㄨㄛˊ)) (AD 1032–1104) – Ruled by the House of sPu-rgyal (悉補野) of Tibetan descent
- Tuoba tribe (拓跋部(ㄊㄨㄛˋ ㄅㄚˊ ㄅㄨˋ)) (?–AD 1038) – Ruled by the House of Tuoba (拓跋) of Tangut descent
- Western Xia (西夏(ㄒㄧ ㄒㄧㄚˋ)) (AD 1038–1227) – Ruled by the House of Weiming (嵬名) of Tangut descent
- Luoshi Kingdom (羅氏鬼國(ㄌㄨㄛˊ ㄕˋ ㄍㄨㄟˇ ㄍㄨㄛˊ)) (AD 1042–1278)
- Yongkang Aboriginal County (永康土縣(ㄩㄥˇ ㄎㄤ ㄊㄨˇ ㄒㄧㄢˋ)) (AD 1053–1472) – Ruled by the House of Yang (楊)
- Mingying Aboriginal Prefecture (茗盈土州(ㄇㄧㄥˊ ㄧㄥˊ ㄊㄨˇ ㄓㄡ)) (AD 1053–1916) – Ruled by the House of Li (李)
- Xialei Aboriginal Prefecture (下雷土州(ㄒㄧㄚˋ ㄌㄟˊ ㄊㄨˇ ㄓㄡ)) (AD 1053–1928)
- Nadi Aboriginal Prefecture (那地土州(ㄋㄚˋ ㄉㄧˋ ㄊㄨˇ ㄓㄡ)) (AD 1068–1927)
- Shazhou Uyghur Kingdom (沙州回鶻(ㄕㄚ ㄓㄡ ㄏㄨㄟˊ ㄏㄨˊ)) (?–AD 1071)
- Nandan Aboriginal Prefecture (南丹土州(ㄋㄢˊ ㄉㄢ ㄊㄨˇ ㄓㄡ)) (AD 1080–1919) – Ruled by the House of Mo (莫) of Zhuang descent
- Dazhong (大中(ㄉㄚˋ ㄓㄨㄥ)) (AD 1094–1096) – Interrupted the Dali Kingdom; Ruled by the House of Gao (高) of Baiman descent
  - Chiefdom of Yao'an (姚安土司(ㄧㄠˊ ㄢ ㄊㄨˇ ㄙ)) (AD 1147–1729)
  - Chiefdom of Heqing (鶴慶土司(ㄏㄜˋ ㄑㄧㄥˋ ㄊㄨˇ ㄙ)) (AD 1253–1437)
  - Chiefdom of Yongsheng (永勝土司(ㄩㄥˇ ㄕㄥˋ ㄊㄨˇ ㄙ)) (?–AD 1946)
- Keraite state (克烈(ㄎㄜˋ ㄌㄧㄝˋ)) (AD 11th century–13th century)
- Chiefdom of Baishan (白山土司(ㄅㄞˊ ㄕㄢ ㄊㄨˇ ㄙ)) (AD 11th century–1915)
- Zhongzhou Aboriginal Prefecture (忠州土州(ㄓㄨㄥ ㄓㄡ ㄊㄨˇ ㄓㄡ)) (AD 11th century–1916)
- Sizhou Aboriginal Prefecture (思州土州(ㄙ ㄓㄡ ㄊㄨˇ ㄓㄡ)) (AD 11th century–1916)
- Quanming Aboriginal Prefecture (全茗土州(ㄑㄩㄢˊ ㄇㄧㄥˊ ㄊㄨˇ ㄓㄡ)) (AD 11th century–1916) – Ruled by the House of Xu (許)
- Zhenyuan Aboriginal Prefecture (鎮遠土州(ㄓㄣˋ ㄩㄢˇ ㄊㄨˇ ㄓㄡ)) (AD 11th century–1916)
- Jie'an Aboriginal Prefecture (結安土州(ㄐㄧㄝˊ ㄢ ㄊㄨˇ ㄓㄡ)) (AD 11th century–1916) – Ruled by the House of Zhang (張)
- Shangying Aboriginal Prefecture (上映土州(ㄕㄤˋ ㄧㄥˋ ㄊㄨˇ ㄓㄡ)) (AD 11th century–1917)
- Guide Aboriginal Prefecture (歸德土州(ㄍㄨㄟ ㄉㄜˊ ㄊㄨˇ ㄓㄡ)) (AD 11th century–1917) – Ruled by the House of Huang (黃)
- Jiangzhou Aboriginal Prefecture (江州土州(ㄐㄧㄤ ㄓㄡ ㄊㄨˇ ㄓㄡ)) (AD 11th century–1918)
- Xiashixi Aboriginal Prefecture (下石西土州(ㄒㄧㄚˋ ㄕˊ ㄒㄧ ㄊㄨˇ ㄓㄡ)) (AD 11th century–1927)
- Luoyang Aboriginal County (羅陽土縣(ㄌㄨㄛˊ ㄧㄤˊ ㄊㄨˇ ㄒㄧㄢˋ)) (AD 11th century–1927) – Ruled by the House of Huang (黃)
- Luobai Aboriginal County (羅白土縣(ㄌㄨㄛˊ ㄅㄞˊ ㄊㄨˇ ㄒㄧㄢˋ)) (AD 11th century–1927)
- Taiping Aboriginal Prefecture (太平土州(ㄊㄞˋ ㄆㄧㄥˊ ㄊㄨˇ ㄓㄡ)) (AD 11th century–1928) – Ruled by the House of Li (李)
- Shanglin Aboriginal County (上林土縣(ㄕㄤˋ ㄌㄧㄣˊ ㄊㄨˇ ㄒㄧㄢˋ)) (AD 11th century–1928)
- Chiefdom of Lingtsang (林蔥土司(ㄌㄧㄣˊ ㄘㄨㄥ ㄊㄨˇ ㄙ)) (AD 11th century–1959)
- Ziqi (自杞(ㄗˋ ㄑㄧˇ)) (AD 1100–1259)
- Fengshan Aboriginal Prefecture (鳳山土州(ㄈㄥˋ ㄕㄢ ㄊㄨˇ ㄓㄡ)) (AD 1106–1926)
- Jin dynasty (金朝(ㄐㄧㄣ ㄔㄠˊ)) (AD 1115–1234) – Ruled by the House of Wanyan (完顏) of Jurchen descent
- Great Bohai (大渤海(ㄉㄚˋ ㄅㄛˊ ㄏㄞˇ)) (AD 1116) – Ruled by the House of Gao (高)
- Xi (奚(ㄒㄧ)) (AD 1123) – Ruled by the House of Xiao (蕭) of Kumo Xi descent
- Chu (楚(ㄔㄨˇ)) (AD 1127) – Ruled by the House of Zhang (張) of Han descent
- Chiefdom of Shizhu (石砫土司(ㄕˊ ㄓㄨˋ ㄊㄨˇ ㄙ)) (AD 1129–1761) – Ruled by the House of Ma (馬) of Tujia descent
- Liu Qi (劉齊(ㄌㄧㄡˊ ㄑㄧˊ)) (AD 1130–1137) – Ruled by the House of Liu (劉) of Han descent
- Shizhu Anfusi Qianshi (石砫安撫司僉事(ㄕˊ ㄓㄨˋ ㄢ ㄈㄨˇ ㄙ ㄑㄧㄢ ㄕˋ)) (AD 1131–1599) – Ruled by the House of Ran (冉)
- Khamag Mongol (蒙兀(ㄇㄥˇ ㄨˋ)) (AD 1148–1171) – Ruled by the House of Borjigin (孛兒只斤) of Mongol descent
- Former Northwestern Liao (前西北遼(ㄑㄧㄢˊ ㄒㄧ ㄅㄟˇ ㄌㄧㄠˊ)) (AD 1161–1164) – Ruled by the House of Yelü (耶律) of Khitan descent
- Ren Chu (任楚(ㄖㄣˊ ㄔㄨˇ)) (AD 1170) – Ruled by the House of Ren (任) of Han descent
- Chiefdom of Nangqên (囊謙土司(ㄋㄤˊ ㄑㄧㄢ ㄊㄨˇ ㄙ)) (AD 1175–1955) – Ruled by the House of Zhi (智) of Tibetan descent
- Chiang Hung (景隴金殿國(ㄐㄧㄥˇ ㄌㄨㄥˇ ㄐㄧㄣ ㄉㄧㄢˋ ㄍㄨㄛˊ)) (AD 1180–1950)
  - Chiefdom of Cheli (車里土司(ㄔㄜ ㄌㄧˇ ㄊㄨˇ ㄙ)) (AD 1384–?)
- Later Northwestern Liao (後西北遼(ㄏㄡˋ ㄒㄧ ㄅㄟˇ ㄌㄧㄠˊ)) (AD 1196) – Ruled by the House of Yelü (耶律) of Khitan descent
- Imucu (伊姆諸(ㄧ ㄇㄨˇ ㄓㄨ)) (AD 12th century–1925)
- Chiefdom of Luowu (羅婺土司(ㄌㄨㄛˊ ㄨˋ ㄊㄨˇ ㄙ)) (AD 12th century–20th century) – Ruled by the House of Feng (鳳)
- Naiman state (乃蠻(ㄋㄞˇ ㄇㄢˊ)) (?–AD 1206) – Ruled by the House of Güčügüt (古出古惕) of Naiman descent
  - Northern Naiman (北乃蠻(ㄅㄟˇ ㄋㄞˇ ㄇㄢˊ)) (AD 1198–1204)
  - Southern Naiman (南乃蠻(ㄋㄢˊ ㄋㄞˇ ㄇㄢˊ)) (AD 1198–1206)
- Mongol Empire (蒙古帝國(ㄇㄥˇ ㄍㄨˇ ㄉㄧˋ ㄍㄨㄛˊ)) (AD 1206–1368) – Ruled by the House of Borjigin (孛兒只斤) of Mongol descent
  - Ögedei Khanate (窩闊台汗國(ㄨㄛ ㄎㄨㄛˋ ㄊㄞˊ ㄏㄢˊ ㄍㄨㄛˊ)) (AD 1225–1309)
  - Chagatai Khanate (察合台汗國(ㄔㄚˊ ㄍㄜˇ ㄊㄞˊ ㄏㄢˊ ㄍㄨㄛˊ)) (AD 1225–1346)
    - Western Chagatai Khanate (西察合台汗國(ㄒㄧ ㄔㄚˊ ㄍㄜˇ ㄊㄞˊ ㄏㄢˊ ㄍㄨㄛˊ)) (AD 1346–1402)
    - Eastern Chagatai Khanate (東察合台汗國(ㄉㄨㄥ ㄔㄚˊ ㄍㄜˇ ㄊㄞˊ ㄏㄢˊ ㄍㄨㄛˊ)) (AD 1347–1680)
      - Beshbalik (別失八里(ㄅㄧㄝˊ ㄕ ㄅㄚ ㄌㄧˇ)) (AD 1389–1418)
      - Ili Baliq (亦力把里(ㄧˋ ㄌㄧˋ ㄅㄚˇ ㄌㄧˇ)) (AD 1418–1508)
      - Turpan Khanate (吐魯番汗國(ㄊㄨˇ ㄌㄨˇ ㄈㄢ ㄏㄢˊ ㄍㄨㄛˊ)) (AD 1487–1660)
      - Yarkent Khanate (葉爾羌汗國(ㄧㄝˋ ㄦˇ ㄑㄧㄤ ㄏㄢˊ ㄍㄨㄛˊ)) (AD 1514–1705)
  - Yuan dynasty (元朝(ㄩㄢˊ ㄔㄠˊ)) (AD 1271–1368)
    - Northern Yuan (北元(ㄅㄟˇ ㄩㄢˊ)) (AD 1368–1635)
      - Tatar state (韃靼(ㄉㄚˊ ㄉㄚˊ)) (AD 1388–1635)
        - Tüsheet Khanate (土謝圖汗部(ㄊㄨˇ ㄒㄧㄝˋ ㄊㄨˊ ㄏㄢˊ ㄅㄨˋ)) (AD 1691–1923)
        - Setsen Khanate (車臣汗部(ㄔㄜ ㄔㄣˊ ㄏㄢˊ ㄅㄨˋ)) (AD 1691–1923)
        - Jasaghtu Khanate (札薩克圖汗部(ㄓㄚ ㄙㄚˋ ㄎㄜˋ ㄊㄨˊ ㄏㄢˊ ㄅㄨˋ)) (AD 1691–1923)
          - Altan Khanate (阿拉坦汗部(ㄚ ㄌㄚ ㄊㄢˇ ㄏㄢˊ ㄅㄨˋ)) (AD 1609–1691)
        - Sain Noyan Khanate (賽音諾顏汗部(ㄙㄞˋ ㄧㄣ ㄋㄨㄛˋ ㄧㄢˊ ㄏㄢˊ ㄅㄨˋ)) (AD 1731–1923)
- Wu Shu (吳蜀(ㄨˊ ㄕㄨˇ)) (AD 1207) – Ruled by the House of Wu (吳) of Han descent
- Eastern Liao (東遼(ㄉㄨㄥ ㄌㄧㄠˊ)) (AD 1213–1269) – Ruled by the House of Yelü (耶律) of Khitan descent
  - Later Liao (後遼(ㄏㄡˋ ㄌㄧㄠˊ)) (AD 1216–1219)
- Eastern Xia (東夏(ㄉㄨㄥ ㄒㄧㄚˋ)) (AD 1215–1233) – Ruled by the House of Puxian (蒲鮮) of Jurchen descent
- Möng Kawng (孟拱(ㄇㄥˋ ㄍㄨㄥˇ)) (AD 1215–1796)
- Kingdom of Mangalai (曼尕賴(ㄇㄢˋ ㄍㄚˇ ㄌㄞˋ)) (AD 1220–1877)
- Laduijiang (拉堆絳(ㄌㄚ ㄉㄨㄟ ㄐㄧㄤˋ)) (AD 1227–1610)
- Sakya dynasty (薩迦王朝(ㄙㄚˋ ㄐㄧㄚ ㄨㄤˊ ㄔㄠˊ)) (AD 1253–1358) – Ruled by the House of Khön (昆) of Tibetan descent
- Ningzhou Tuzhizhou (寧州土知州(ㄋㄧㄥˊ ㄓㄡ ㄊㄨˇ ㄓ ㄓㄡ)) (AD 1254–?) – Ruled by the House of Lu (祿) of Yi descent
- Chiefdom of Luomeng (落蒙土司(ㄌㄨㄛˋ ㄇㄥˇ ㄊㄨˇ ㄙ)) (AD 1255–1270) – Ruled by the House of Uriankhai (兀良哈)
- Chiefdom of Menggen (孟艮土司(ㄇㄥˋ ㄍㄣˇ ㄊㄨˇ ㄙ)) (AD 1263–1959) – Ruled by the House of Dao (刀) of Dai descent
- Two Petty Principalities under the Yuan dynasty (元朝二小王國(ㄩㄢˊ ㄔㄠˊ ㄦˋ ㄒㄧㄠˇ ㄨㄤˊ ㄍㄨㄛˊ)) (AD 1269–?) – Ruled by the House of Borjigin (孛兒只斤) of Mongol descent
  - Principality of Xiping (西平王國(ㄒㄧ ㄆㄧㄥˊ ㄨㄤˊ ㄍㄨㄛˊ)) (AD 1269–?)
  - Principality of Liang (梁王國(ㄌㄧㄤˊ ㄨㄤˊ ㄍㄨㄛˊ)) (AD 1290–1382)
- Chiefdom of Wusa (烏撒土司(ㄨ ㄙㄚ ㄊㄨˇ ㄙ)) (AD 1276–1666)
- Chiefdom of Wumeng (烏蒙土司(ㄨ ㄇㄥˇ ㄊㄨˇ ㄙ)) (AD 1276–1727)
- Chiefdom of Mangbu (芒部土司(ㄇㄤˊ ㄅㄨˋ ㄊㄨˇ ㄙ)) (AD 1276–1727) – Ruled by the House of Long (隴) of Yi descent
- Chiefdom of Manyi (蠻夷土司(ㄇㄢˊ ㄧˊ ㄊㄨˇ ㄙ)) (AD 1276–19th century) – Ruled by the House of Wen (文)
- Chiefdom of Malong Prefecture (馬龍州土司(ㄇㄚˇ ㄌㄨㄥˊ ㄓㄡ ㄊㄨˇ ㄙ)) (AD 1276–?) – Ruled by the House of An (安) of Yi descent
- Mengzi County Tuxiancheng (蒙自縣土縣丞(ㄇㄥˊ ㄗˋ ㄒㄧㄢˋ ㄊㄨˇ ㄒㄧㄢˋ ㄔㄥˊ)) (AD 1276–?) – Ruled by the House of Li (李) of Yi descent
- Chiefdom of Tong'an Prefecture (通安州土司(ㄊㄨㄥ ㄢ ㄓㄡ ㄊㄨˇ ㄙ)) (AD 1277–?) – Ruled by the House of Gao (高) of Bai descent
- Chuxiong Tuxunjian (楚雄土巡檢(ㄔㄨˇ ㄒㄩㄥˊ ㄊㄨˇ ㄒㄩㄣˊ ㄐㄧㄢˇ)) (AD 13th century–?) – Ruled by the House of Yang (楊) of Mongol descent
- Chiefdom of Rongmei (容美土司(ㄖㄨㄥˊ ㄇㄟˇ ㄊㄨˇ ㄙ)) (AD 1310–1735) – Ruled by the House of Tian (田) of Tujia descent
- Chiefdom of Shunning Prefecture (順寧府土司(ㄕㄨㄣˋ ㄋㄧㄥˊ ㄈㄨˇ ㄊㄨˇ ㄙ)) (AD 1327–?) – Ruled by the House of Meng (猛) of Blang descent
- Chiefdom of Mengqing (蒙慶土司(ㄇㄥˇ ㄑㄧㄥˋ ㄊㄨˇ ㄙ)) (AD 1327–?)
- Babai Dengchu Xuanweisi (八百等處宣慰司(ㄅㄚ ㄅㄞˇ ㄉㄥˇ ㄔㄨˋ ㄒㄩㄢ ㄨㄟˋ ㄙ)) (AD 1331–?, AD 1346–?)
- Three Great Principalities under the Yuan dynasty (元朝三大王國(ㄩㄢˊ ㄔㄠˊ ㄙㄢ ㄉㄚˋ ㄨㄤˊ ㄍㄨㄛˊ)) (?–AD 1332) – Ruled by the House of Borjigin (孛兒只斤) of Mongol descent
  - Principality of Beiping (北平王國(ㄅㄟˇ ㄆㄧㄥˊ ㄨㄤˊ ㄍㄨㄛˊ)) (?–AD 1282)
  - Principality of Yan (燕王國(ㄧㄢ ㄨㄤˊ ㄍㄨㄛˊ)) (AD 1262–1331)
  - Principality of Anxi (安西王國(ㄢ ㄒㄧ ㄨㄤˊ ㄍㄨㄛˊ)) (AD 1272–1332)
- Chiefdom of Langqu (蒗蕖土司(ㄌㄤˋ ㄑㄩˊ ㄊㄨˇ ㄙ)) (AD 1332–1917) – Ruled by the House of A (阿)
- Chiefdom of Laogao (老告土司(ㄌㄠˇ ㄍㄠˋ ㄊㄨˇ ㄙ)) (AD 1338–?)
- Chiefdom of Jindong (金峒土司(ㄐㄧㄣ ㄉㄨㄥˋ ㄊㄨˇ ㄙ)) (AD 1346–1735) – Ruled by the House of Tan (覃) of Tujia descent
- Tianwan (天完(ㄊㄧㄢ ㄨㄢˊ)) (AD 1351–1360) – Ruled by the House of Xu (徐) of Han descent
- Chiefdom of Zhongxiao (忠孝土司(ㄓㄨㄥ ㄒㄧㄠˋ ㄊㄨˇ ㄙ)) (AD 1351–1734) – Ruled by the House of Tian (田) of Tujia descent
- Zhang Zhou (張周(ㄓㄤ ㄓㄡ)) (AD 1354–1357) – Ruled by the House of Zhang (張) of Han descent
  - Zhang Wu (張吳(ㄓㄤ ㄨˊ)) (AD 1363–1367)
- Phagmodrupa dynasty (帕木竹巴(ㄆㄚˋ ㄇㄨˋ ㄓㄨˊ ㄅㄚ)) (AD 1354–1618) – Ruled by the House of rLangs Lha-gzigs (朗林色) of Tibetan descent
- Han Song (韓宋(ㄏㄢˊ ㄙㄨㄥˋ)) (AD 1355–1366) – Ruled by the House of Han (韓) of Han descent
- Chiefdom of Tangya (唐崖土司(ㄊㄤˊ ㄧㄚˊ ㄊㄨˇ ㄙ)) (AD 1355–1735) – Ruled by the House of Tan (覃) of Mongol descent
- Chen Han (陳漢(ㄔㄣˊ ㄏㄢˋ)) (AD 1360–1364) – Ruled by the House of Chen (陳) of Han descent
- Shangxiadong Aboriginal Prefecture (上下凍土州(ㄕㄤˋ ㄒㄧㄚˋ ㄉㄨㄥˋ ㄊㄨˇ ㄓㄡ)) (AD 1360–1927)
- Ming Xia (明夏(ㄇㄧㄥˊ ㄒㄧㄚˋ)) (AD 1363–1371) – Ruled by the House of Ming (明) of Han descent
- Chiefdom of Maogang (茅岡土司(ㄇㄠˊ ㄍㄤ ㄊㄨˇ ㄙ)) (AD 1364–20th century) – Ruled by the House of Tan (覃) of Tujia descent
- Ming dynasty (明朝(ㄇㄧㄥˊ ㄔㄠˊ)) (AD 1368–1644) – Ruled by the House of Zhu (朱) of Han descent
  - Western Wu (西吳(ㄒㄧ ㄨˊ)) (AD 1364–1368)
  - Southern Ming (南明(ㄋㄢˊ ㄇㄧㄥˊ)) (AD 1644–1662)
- Chiefdom of Tianping (添平土司(ㄊㄧㄢ ㄆㄧㄥˊ ㄊㄨˇ ㄙ)) (AD 1369–1735) – Ruled by the House of Tan (覃) of Tujia descent
- Eighteen Chiefdoms of Gyalrong (嘉絨十八土司(ㄐㄧㄚ ㄖㄨㄥˊ ㄕˊ ㄅㄚ ㄊㄨˇ ㄙ)) (AD 1369–1955)
  - Chiefdom of Lengbian (冷邊土司(ㄌㄥˇ ㄅㄧㄢ ㄊㄨˇ ㄙ)) (AD 1369–1911) – Ruled by the House of Zhou (周) of Tibetan descent
  - Chiefdom of Zagu (雜谷土司(ㄗㄚˊ ㄍㄨˇ ㄊㄨˇ ㄙ)) (AD 1407–1752)
  - Chiefdom of Chakla (明正土司(ㄇㄧㄥˊ ㄓㄥˋ ㄊㄨˇ ㄙ)) (AD 1407–1911) – Ruled by the House of Jia (甲) of Gyalrong descent
  - Chiefdom of Muping (穆坪土司(ㄇㄨˋ ㄆㄧㄥˊ ㄊㄨˇ ㄙ)) (AD 1410–1928) – Ruled by the House of Jia (甲) of Gyalrong descent
    - Chiefdom of Suomo (梭磨土司(ㄙㄨㄛ ㄇㄛˊ ㄊㄨˇ ㄙ)) (AD 1721–1938)
      - Chiefdom of Songgang (松崗土司(ㄙㄨㄥ ㄍㄤˇ ㄊㄨˇ ㄙ)) (AD 1753–1928)
  - Chiefdom of Wasi (瓦寺土司(ㄨㄚˇ ㄙˋ ㄊㄨˇ ㄙ)) (AD 1441–1935) – Ruled by the House of Suo (索) of Gyalrong descent
  - Chiefdom of Shenbian (沈邊土司(ㄕㄣˇ ㄅㄧㄢ ㄊㄨˇ ㄙ)) (AD 1639–1911) – Ruled by the House of Yu (余) of Mongol descent
  - Chiefdom of Tsanlha (贊拉土司(ㄗㄢˋ ㄌㄚ ㄊㄨˇ ㄙ)) (AD 1650–1776)
  - Chiefdom of Wori (沃日土司(ㄨㄛˋ ㄖˋ ㄊㄨˇ ㄙ)) (AD 1658–1951) – Ruled by the House of Yang (楊) of Gyalrong descent
  - Chiefdom of Trokyap (綽斯甲土司(ㄔㄨㄛˋ ㄙ ㄐㄧㄚˇ ㄊㄨˇ ㄙ)) (AD 1702–?)
  - Chiefdom of Chuchen (促侵土司(ㄘㄨˋ ㄑㄧㄣ ㄊㄨˇ ㄙ)) (AD 1723–1776)
  - Chiefdom of Tianquan (天全土司(ㄊㄧㄢ ㄑㄩㄢˊ ㄊㄨˇ ㄙ)) (?–AD 1729) – Co-ruled by the House of Gao (高) of Gyalrong descent and the House of Yang (楊) of Gyalrong descent
  - Chiefdom of Zhuokeji (卓克基土司(ㄓㄨㄛˊ ㄎㄜˋ ㄐㄧ ㄊㄨˇ ㄙ)) (AD 1748–1955)
  - Chiefdom of Dangba (黨壩土司(ㄉㄤˇ ㄅㄚˋ ㄊㄨˇ ㄙ)) (AD 1753–1953)
  - Chiefdom of Bawang (巴旺土司(ㄅㄚ ㄨㄤˋ ㄊㄨˇ ㄙ)) (AD 1774–?)
    - Chiefdom of Badi (巴底土司(ㄅㄚ ㄉㄧˇ ㄊㄨˇ ㄙ)) (AD 1774–?)
  - Chiefdom of Dandong Geshizan (丹東革什咱土司(ㄉㄢ ㄉㄨㄥ ㄍㄜˊ ㄕˊ ㄗㄢˊ ㄊㄨˇ ㄙ)) (?–?)
- Wancheng Aboriginal Prefecture (萬承土州(ㄨㄢˋ ㄔㄥˊ ㄊㄨˇ ㄓㄡ)) (AD 1369–1927) – Ruled by the House of Xu (許)
- Chiefdom of Qianlongdong (遷隆峒土司(ㄑㄧㄢ ㄌㄨㄥˊ ㄉㄨㄥˋ ㄊㄨˇ ㄓㄡ)) (AD 1369–1927)
- Chiefdom of Shanglong (上龍土司(ㄕㄤˋ ㄌㄨㄥˊ ㄊㄨˇ ㄓㄡ)) (AD 1369–1928)
- Chiefdom of Zhonglu (忠路土司(ㄓㄨㄥ ㄌㄨˋ ㄊㄨˇ ㄙ)) (AD 1371–1390, AD 1407–1735) – Ruled by the House of Tan (覃) of Tujia descent
- Xundian Tuzhifu (尋甸土知府(ㄒㄩㄣˊ ㄉㄧㄢˋ ㄊㄨˇ ㄓ ㄈㄨˇ)) (AD 1372–?)
- Chiefdom of Gaoluo (高羅土司(ㄍㄠ ㄌㄨㄛˊ ㄊㄨˇ ㄙ)) (AD 1373–?, AD 1407–1735) – Ruled by the House of Tian (田) of Tujia descent
- Chiefdom of Biligongwa (必力工瓦土司(ㄅㄧˋ ㄌㄧˋ ㄍㄨㄥ ㄨㄚˇ ㄊㄨˇ ㄙ)) (AD 1373–?)
- Chiefdom of Baojing Prefecture (保靖州土司(ㄅㄠˇ ㄐㄧㄥˋ ㄓㄡ ㄊㄨˇ ㄙ)) (AD 1374–1729) – Ruled by the House of Peng (彭)
- Chiefdom of Duogandan (朵甘丹土司(ㄉㄨㄛˇ ㄍㄢ ㄉㄢ ㄊㄨˇ ㄙ)) (AD 1374–?)
- Chiefdom of Duogancangtang (朵甘倉溏土司(ㄉㄨㄛˇ ㄍㄢ ㄘㄤ ㄊㄤˊ ㄊㄨˇ ㄙ)) (AD 1374–?)
- Duogansi Xuanweishisi (朵甘思宣慰使司(ㄉㄨㄛˇ ㄍㄢ ㄙ ㄒㄩㄢ ㄨㄟˋ ㄕˇ ㄙ)) (AD 1374–?)
- Duogansi Zhaotaosi (朵甘思招討司(ㄉㄨㄛˇ ㄍㄢ ㄙ ㄓㄠ ㄊㄠˇ ㄙ)) (AD 1374–?)
- Duogansi Qianhusuo (朵甘思千戶所(ㄉㄨㄛˇ ㄍㄢ ㄙ ㄑㄧㄢ ㄏㄨˋ ㄙㄨㄛˇ)) (AD 1374–?)
- Chiefdom of Duoganchuan (朵甘川土司(ㄉㄨㄛˇ ㄍㄢ ㄔㄨㄢ ㄊㄨˇ ㄙ)) (AD 1374–?)
- Chiefdom of Duoganlongda (朵甘隴答土司(ㄉㄨㄛˇ ㄍㄢ ㄌㄨㄥˇ ㄉㄚˊ ㄊㄨˇ ㄙ)) (AD 1374–?)
- Chiefdom of Mo'erkan (磨兒勘土司(ㄇㄛˊ ㄦˊ ㄎㄢ ㄊㄨˇ ㄙ)) (AD 1374–?)
- Chiefdom of Dasima (答思麻土司(ㄉㄚˊ ㄙ ㄇㄚˊ ㄊㄨˇ ㄙ)) (AD 1374–?)
- Chiefdom of Changhexi (長河西土司(ㄔㄤˊ ㄏㄜˊ ㄒㄧ ㄊㄨˇ ㄙ)) (AD 1374–?)
- Chiefdom of Longmu (隴木土司(ㄌㄨㄥˇ ㄇㄨˋ ㄊㄨˇ ㄙ)) (AD 1374–?) – Ruled by the House of Yang (楊)
- Chiefdom of Jingzhou (靜州土司(ㄐㄧㄥˋ ㄓㄡ ㄊㄨˇ ㄙ)) (AD 1374–?) – Ruled by the House of Dong (董)
- Chiefdom of Yuexipeng (岳希蓬土司(ㄩㄝˋ ㄒㄧ ㄆㄥˊ ㄊㄨˇ ㄙ)) (AD 1374–?) – Ruled by the House of Kun (坤)
- Chiefdom of Yimeidong (邑梅洞土司(ㄧˋ ㄇㄟˊ ㄉㄨㄥˋ ㄊㄨˇ ㄙ)) (AD 1375–1736)
- Chiefdom of Sha'erke (沙兒可土司(ㄕㄚ ㄦˊ ㄎㄜˇ ㄊㄨˇ ㄙ)) (AD 1375–?)
- Chiefdom of Naizhu (乃竹土司(ㄋㄞˇ ㄓㄨˊ ㄊㄨˇ ㄙ)) (AD 1375–?)
- Chiefdom of Luosiduan (羅思端土司(ㄌㄨㄛˊ ㄙ ㄉㄨㄢ ㄊㄨˇ ㄙ)) (AD 1375–?)
- Chiefdom of Elisi (俄力思土司(ㄝˊ ㄌㄧˋ ㄙ ㄊㄨˇ ㄙ)) (AD 1375–?)
- Chiefdom of Dalong (答籠土司(ㄉㄚˊ ㄌㄨㄥˊ ㄊㄨˇ ㄙ)) (AD 1375–?)
- Chiefdom of Shiyedong (石耶洞土司(ㄕˊ ㄧㄝ ㄉㄨㄥˋ ㄊㄨˇ ㄙ)) (AD 1375–?) – Ruled by the House of Yang (楊)
- Donglan Aboriginal Prefecture (東蘭土州(ㄉㄨㄥ ㄌㄢˊ ㄊㄨˇ ㄓㄡ)) (AD 1379–1729)
- Kara Del (哈密國(ㄏㄚ ㄇㄧˋ ㄍㄨㄛˊ)) (AD 1380–1513) – Ruled by the House of Borjigin (孛兒只斤) of Mongol descent
- Kingdom of Mustang (木斯塘王國(ㄇㄨˋ ㄙ ㄊㄤˊ ㄨㄤˊ ㄍㄨㄛˊ)) (AD 1380–2008)
- Chiefdom of Yongning (永寧土司(ㄩㄥˇ ㄋㄧㄥˊ ㄊㄨˇ ㄙ)) (AD 1381–1956) – Ruled by the House of A (阿) of Mosuo descent
- Chiefdom of Baishuiguan (白水關土司(ㄅㄞˊ ㄕㄨㄟˇ ㄍㄨㄢ ㄊㄨˇ ㄙ)) (AD 1381–?) – Ruled by the House of Li (李)
- Chiefdom of Anning Prefecture (安寧州土司(ㄢ ㄋㄧㄥˊ ㄓㄡ ㄊㄨˇ ㄙ)) (AD 1381–?) – Ruled by the House of Dong (董) of Bai descent
- Chiefdom of Nan'an Prefecture (南安州土司(ㄋㄢˊ ㄢ ㄓㄡ ㄊㄨˇ ㄙ)) (AD 1381–?) – Ruled by the House of Li (李)
- Chiefdom of Lubiao (祿脿土司(ㄌㄨˋ ㄅㄧㄠ ㄊㄨˇ ㄙ)) (AD 1381–?) – Ruled by the House of Zhao (趙) of Bai descent
- Chiefdom of Axidongcu (阿昔洞簇土司(ㄚ ㄒㄧ ㄉㄨㄥˋ ㄘㄨˋ ㄊㄨˇ ㄙ)) (AD 1381–?)
- Chiefdom of Baimalucu (白馬路簇土司(ㄅㄞˊ ㄇㄚˇ ㄌㄨˋ ㄘㄨˋ ㄊㄨˇ ㄙ)) (AD 1381–?)
- Chiefdom of Beidingcu (北定簇土司(ㄅㄟˇ ㄉㄧㄥˋ ㄘㄨˋ ㄊㄨˇ ㄙ)) (AD 1381–?)
- Chiefdom of Lazacu (蠟匝簇土司(ㄌㄚˋ ㄗㄚ ㄘㄨˋ ㄊㄨˇ ㄙ)) (AD 1381–?)
- Chiefdom of Maizacu (麥匝簇土司(ㄇㄞˋ ㄗㄚ ㄘㄨˋ ㄊㄨˇ ㄙ)) (AD 1381–?)
- Chiefdom of Zheduocu (者多簇土司(ㄓㄜˇ ㄉㄨㄛ ㄘㄨˋ ㄊㄨˇ ㄙ)) (AD 1381–?)
- Chiefdom of Moulijiecu (牟力結簇土司(ㄇㄡˊ ㄌㄧˋ ㄐㄧㄝˊ ㄘㄨˋ ㄊㄨˇ ㄙ)) (AD 1381–?)
- Chiefdom of Qimingcu (祈命簇土司(ㄑㄧˊ ㄇㄧㄥˋ ㄘㄨˋ ㄊㄨˇ ㄙ)) (AD 1381–?)
- Chiefdom of Leducu (勒都簇土司(ㄌㄜˋ ㄉㄨ ㄘㄨˋ ㄊㄨˇ ㄙ)) (AD 1381–?)
- Chiefdom of Baozangcu (包藏簇土司(ㄅㄠ ㄗㄤˋ ㄘㄨˋ ㄊㄨˇ ㄙ)) (AD 1381–?)
- Chiefdom of Jinshajiang (金沙江土司(ㄢ ㄋㄧㄥˊ ㄓㄡ ㄊㄨˇ ㄙ)) (AD 1381–?) – Ruled by the House of De (得)
- Lijiang Tuzhifu (麗江土知府(ㄌㄧˋ ㄐㄧㄤ ㄊㄨˇ ㄓ ㄈㄨˇ)) (AD 1382–1723) – Ruled by the House of Mu (木) of Nakhi descent
- Chiefdom of Situodian (思陀甸土司(ㄙ ㄊㄨㄛˊ ㄉㄧㄢˋ ㄊㄨˇ ㄙ)) (AD 1382–1912)
- Chiefdom of Lujiang (潞江土司(ㄌㄨˋ ㄐㄧㄤ ㄊㄨˇ ㄙ)) (AD 1382–1956) – Ruled by the House of Nang (曩) of Dai descent
- Chiefdom of Mengding (孟定土司(ㄇㄥˋ ㄉㄧㄥˋ ㄊㄨˇ ㄙ)) (AD 1382–?) – Ruled by the House of Dao (刀) of Dai descent and the House of Han (罕) of Dai descent
- Chiefdom of Yangsiduo (仰思多土司(ㄧㄤˇ ㄙ ㄉㄨㄛ ㄊㄨˇ ㄙ)) (AD 1382–?)
- Chiefdom of Shaqiaoyi (沙橋驛土司(ㄕㄚ ㄑㄧㄠˊ ㄧˋ ㄊㄨˇ ㄙ)) (AD 1382–?) – Ruled by the House of Yang (楊) of Bai descent
- Chiefdom of Lesser Pingfa (小平伐土司(ㄒㄧㄠˇ ㄆㄧㄥˊ ㄈㄚˊ ㄊㄨˇ ㄙ)) (AD 1382–?)
- Chiefdom of Chengjiang Prefecture (澄江府土司(ㄔㄥˊ ㄐㄧㄤ ㄈㄨˇ ㄊㄨˇ ㄙ)) (AD 1382–?) – Ruled by the House of Dao (刀) of Dai descent
- Chiefdom of Lunan Prefecture (路南州土司(ㄌㄨˋ ㄋㄢˊ ㄓㄡ ㄊㄨˇ ㄙ)) (AD 1382–?) – Ruled by the House of Qin (秦) of Yi descent
- Chiefdom of Guangnan Prefecture (廣南府土司(ㄍㄨㄤˇ ㄋㄢˊ ㄈㄨˇ ㄊㄨˇ ㄙ)) (AD 1382–?) – Ruled by the House of Nong (儂) of Zhuang descent
- Chiefdom of Luoxiong Prefecture (羅雄州土司(ㄌㄨㄛˊ ㄒㄩㄥˊ ㄓㄡ ㄊㄨˇ ㄙ)) (AD 1382–?) – Ruled by the House of Zhe (者) of Yi descent
- Chiefdom of Qujing Prefecture (曲靖府土司(ㄑㄩ ㄐㄧㄥˋ ㄈㄨˇ ㄊㄨˇ ㄙ)) (AD 1382–?) – Ruled by the House of Yang (楊) of Bai descent
- Chiefdom of Guanjianshan (觀間山土司(ㄍㄨㄢ ㄐㄧㄢ ㄕㄢ ㄊㄨˇ ㄙ)) (AD 1382–?) – Ruled by the House of Wang (王) of Yi descent
- Chiefdom of Xuanhuaguan (宣化關土司(ㄒㄩㄢ ㄏㄨㄚˋ ㄍㄨㄢ ㄊㄨˇ ㄙ)) (AD 1382–?) – Ruled by the House of Luo (羅) of Yi descent
- Chiefdom of Mishajing (彌沙井土司(ㄇㄧˊ ㄕㄚ ㄐㄧㄥˇ ㄊㄨˇ ㄙ)) (AD 1382–?) – Ruled by the House of Sha (沙)
- Chiefdom of Guanyinshanyi (觀音山驛土司(ㄍㄨㄢ ㄧㄣ ㄕㄢ ㄧˋ ㄊㄨˇ ㄙ)) (AD 1382–?) – Ruled by the House of Guo (郭) of Yi descent
- Chiefdom of Yimen County (易門縣土司(ㄧˋ ㄇㄣˊ ㄒㄧㄢˋ ㄊㄨˇ ㄙ)) (AD 1382–?) – Ruled by the House of Wang (王) of Bai descent
- Chiefdom of Dengchuan Prefecture (鄧川州土司(ㄉㄥˋ ㄔㄨㄢ ㄓㄡ ㄊㄨˇ ㄙ)) (AD 1382–?) – Ruled by the House of A (阿) of Dai descent
- Chiefdom of Dali Prefecture (大理府土司(ㄉㄚˋ ㄌㄧˇ ㄈㄨˇ ㄊㄨˇ ㄙ)) (AD 1382–?) – Ruled by the House of Dong (董) of Bai descent
- Chiefdom of Caojian (漕澗土司(ㄘㄠˊ ㄐㄧㄢˋ ㄊㄨˇ ㄙ)) (AD 1382–?) – Ruled by the House of Zuo (左)
- Chiefdom of Qingsuobi (青索鼻土司(ㄑㄧㄥ ㄙㄨㄛˇ ㄅㄧˊ ㄊㄨˇ ㄙ)) (AD 1382–?) – Ruled by the House of Yang (楊) of Bai descent
- Chiefdom of Annanpo (安南坡土司(ㄢ ㄋㄢˊ ㄆㄛ ㄊㄨˇ ㄙ)) (AD 1382–?) – Ruled by the House of Li (李) of Bai descent
- Chiefdom of Fengyuxiang (鳳羽鄉土司(ㄈㄥˋ ㄩˇ ㄒㄧㄤ ㄊㄨˇ ㄙ)) (AD 1382–?) – Ruled by the House of Yin (尹) of Bai descent
- Chiefdom of Upper Jiangzui (上江嘴土司(ㄕㄤˋ ㄐㄧㄤ ㄗㄨㄟˇ ㄊㄨˇ ㄙ)) (AD 1382–?) – Ruled by the House of Yang (楊) of Bai descent
- Chiefdom of Shijing (師井土司(ㄕ ㄐㄧㄥˇ ㄊㄨˇ ㄙ)) (AD 1382–?) – Ruled by the House of Yang (楊) of Bai descent
- Chiefdom of Shenmodong (神摩洞土司(ㄕㄣˊ ㄇㄛˊ ㄉㄨㄥˋ ㄊㄨˇ ㄙ)) (AD 1382–?) – Ruled by the House of Zhao (趙) of Bai descent
- Chiefdom of Shundangjing (順蕩井土司(ㄕㄨㄣˋ ㄉㄤˋ ㄐㄧㄥˇ ㄊㄨˇ ㄙ)) (AD 1382–?) – Ruled by the House of Li (李) of Bai descent
- Chiefdom of Shundangyanjing (順蕩鹽井土司(ㄕㄨㄣˋ ㄉㄤˋ ㄧㄢˊ ㄐㄧㄥˇ ㄊㄨˇ ㄙ)) (AD 1382–?) – Ruled by the House of Yang (楊) of Bai descent
- Chiefdom of Langqiong County (浪穹縣土司(ㄌㄤˋ ㄑㄩㄥˊ ㄒㄧㄢˋ ㄊㄨˇ ㄙ)) (AD 1382–?) – Ruled by the House of Wang (王) of Bai descent
- Chiefdom of Deshengguanyi (德勝關驛土司(ㄉㄜˊ ㄕㄥˋ ㄍㄨㄢ ㄧˋ ㄊㄨˇ ㄙ)) (AD 1382–?) – Ruled by the House of Wang (王) of Bai descent
- Chiefdom of Yunnanyi (雲南驛土司(ㄩㄣˊ ㄋㄢˊ ㄧˋ ㄊㄨˇ ㄙ)) (AD 1382–?) – Ruled by the House of Yuan (袁)
- Chiefdom of Erxiyi (洱西驛土司(ㄦˇ ㄒㄧ ㄧˋ ㄊㄨˇ ㄙ)) (AD 1382–?) – Ruled by the House of Zhang (張) of Bai descent
- Chiefdom of Guangtong (廣通土司(ㄍㄨㄤˇ ㄊㄨㄥ ㄊㄨˇ ㄙ)) (AD 1382–?) – Ruled by the House of Duan (段) of Bai descent
- Chiefdom of Nalouchadian (納樓茶甸土司(ㄋㄚˋ ㄌㄡˊ ㄔㄚˊ ㄉㄧㄢˋ ㄊㄨˇ ㄙ)) (AD 1382–?) – Ruled by the House of Pu (普) of Yi descent
- Chiefdom of Kuirongdian (虧容甸土司(ㄎㄨㄟ ㄖㄨㄥˊ ㄉㄧㄢˋ ㄊㄨˇ ㄙ)) (AD 1382–?) – Ruled by the House of Sun (孫) of Dai descent
- Chiefdom of Entuodian (恩陀甸土司(ㄣ ㄊㄨㄛˊ ㄉㄧㄢˋ ㄊㄨˇ ㄙ)) (AD 1382–?) – Ruled by the House of Li (李) of Hani descent
- Chiefdom of Xichudian (溪處甸土司(ㄒㄧ ㄔㄨˋ ㄉㄧㄢˋ ㄊㄨˇ ㄙ)) (AD 1382–?) – Ruled by the House of Zhao (趙) of Hani descent
- Chiefdom of Diexi (疊溪土司(ㄉㄧㄝˊ ㄒㄧ ㄊㄨˇ ㄙ)) (AD 1382–?) – Ruled by the House of Yu (郁)
- Chiefdom of Yingwuguan (英武關土司(ㄧㄥ ㄨˇ ㄍㄨㄢ ㄊㄨˇ ㄙ)) (AD 1382–?) – Ruled by the House of Zhang (張) of Bai descent
- Chiefdom of Zhennanguan (鎮南關土司(ㄓㄣˋ ㄋㄢˊ ㄍㄨㄢ ㄊㄨˇ ㄙ)) (AD 1382–?) – Ruled by the House of Yang (楊) of Bai descent
- Chiefdom of Shayi (沙矣土司(ㄕㄚ ㄧˇ ㄊㄨˇ ㄙ)) (AD 1382–?) – Ruled by the House of Su (蘇)
- Chiefdom of Wazha (瓦渣土司(ㄨㄚˇ ㄓㄚ ㄊㄨˇ ㄙ)) (AD 1382–?) – Ruled by the House of Qian (錢) of Hani descent
- Heqing Tutongzhi (鶴慶土同知(ㄏㄜˋ ㄑㄧㄥˋ ㄊㄨˇ ㄊㄨㄥˊ ㄓ)) (AD 1382–?) – Ruled by the House of Gao (高) of Bai descent
- Heqing Tuzhishi (鶴慶土知事(ㄏㄜˋ ㄑㄧㄥˋ ㄊㄨˇ ㄓ ㄕˋ)) (AD 1382–?) – Ruled by the House of Dong (董) of Bai descent
- Huidengguan Tuxunjian (回蹬關土巡檢(ㄏㄨㄟˊ ㄉㄥ ㄍㄨㄢ ㄊㄨˇ ㄒㄩㄣˊ ㄐㄧㄢˇ)) (AD 1382–?) – Ruled by the House of Yang (楊) of Yi descent
- Huidengguan Tuxunjian (回蹬關土巡檢(ㄏㄨㄟˊ ㄉㄥ ㄍㄨㄢ ㄊㄨˇ ㄒㄩㄣˊ ㄐㄧㄢˇ)) (AD 1382–?) – Ruled by the House of Cheng (成)
- Chuxiong County Tuxiancheng (楚雄縣土縣丞(ㄔㄨˇ ㄒㄩㄥˊ ㄒㄧㄢˋ ㄊㄨˇ ㄒㄧㄢˋ ㄔㄥˊ)) (AD 1382–?) – Ruled by the House of Yang (楊) of Bai descent
- Dingyuan County Tuzhubu (定遠縣土主簿(ㄉㄧㄥˋ ㄩㄢˇ ㄒㄧㄢˋ ㄊㄨˇ ㄓㄨˇ ㄅㄨˋ)) (AD 1382–?) – Ruled by the House of Li (李) of Yi descent
- Xi'e County Tuzhixian (嶍峨縣土知縣(ㄒㄧˊ ㄝˊ ㄒㄧㄢˋ ㄊㄨˇ ㄓ ㄒㄧㄢˋ)) (AD 1382–?) – Ruled by the House of Lu (祿) of Yi descent
- Heqing Prefecture Tuyicheng (鶴慶州土驛丞(ㄏㄜˋ ㄑㄧㄥˋ ㄓㄡ ㄊㄨˇ ㄧˋ ㄔㄥˊ)) (AD 1382–?) – Ruled by the House of Tian (田) of Bai descent
- Zhennan Prefecture Tupanguan (鎮南州土判官(ㄓㄣˋ ㄋㄢˊ ㄓㄡ ㄊㄨˇ ㄆㄢˋ ㄍㄨㄢ)) (AD 1382–?) – Ruled by the House of Chen (陳)
- Baoshan Prefecture Tuzhizhou (寶山州土知州(ㄅㄠˇ ㄕㄢ ㄓㄡ ㄊㄨˇ ㄓ ㄓㄡ)) (AD 1382–?) – Ruled by the House of He (和) of Nakhi descent
- Shi'erguan Tuxunjian (十二關土巡檢(ㄕˊ ㄦˋ ㄍㄨㄢ ㄊㄨˇ ㄒㄩㄣˊ ㄐㄧㄢˇ)) (AD 1382–?) – Ruled by the House of Li (李) of Bai descent
- Shi'erguan Tuxunjian (十二關土巡檢(ㄕˊ ㄦˋ ㄍㄨㄢ ㄊㄨˇ ㄒㄩㄣˊ ㄐㄧㄢˇ)) (AD 1382–?) – Ruled by the House of Zhang (張) of Bai descent
- Chuxiong Prefecture Tuzhifu (楚雄府土知府(ㄔㄨˇ ㄒㄩㄥˊ ㄈㄨˇ ㄊㄨˇ ㄓ ㄈㄨˇ)) (AD 1382–?) – Ruled by the House of Gao (高) of Bai descent
- Chiefdom of Na-shi (那氏土司(ㄋㄚˋ ㄕˋ ㄊㄨˇ ㄙ)) (AD 1383–20th century) – Ruled by the House of Na (那) of Yi descent
- Chiefdom of Yunlong Prefecture (雲龍州土司(ㄩㄣˊ ㄌㄨㄥˊ ㄓㄡ ㄊㄨˇ ㄙ)) (AD 1383–20th century) – Ruled by the House of Duan (段) of Bai descent
  - Chiefdom of Daxingdi (大興地土司(ㄉㄚˋ ㄒㄧㄥ ㄉㄧˋ ㄊㄨˇ ㄙ)) (?–?)
- Dahou Prefecture Tuxunjian (大侯州土巡檢(ㄉㄚˋ ㄏㄡˊ ㄓㄡ ㄊㄨˇ ㄒㄩㄣˊ ㄐㄧㄢˇ)) (AD 1383–?) – Ruled by the House of A (阿) of Blang descent
- Chiefdom of Axiongguan (阿雄關土司(ㄚ ㄒㄩㄥˊ ㄍㄨㄢ ㄊㄨˇ ㄙ)) (AD 1383–?) – Ruled by the House of Zhe (者) of Yi descent
- Chiefdom of Puchang (普昌土司(ㄆㄨˇ ㄔㄤ ㄊㄨˇ ㄙ)) (AD 1383–?) – Ruled by the House of Li (李)
- Chiefdom of Luliang Prefecture (陸涼州土司(ㄌㄨˋ ㄌㄧㄤˊ ㄓㄡ ㄊㄨˇ ㄙ)) (AD 1383–?) – Ruled by the House of Zi (資) of Yi descent
- Chiefdom of Yilongyi (易龍驛土司(ㄧˋ ㄌㄨㄥˊ ㄧˋ ㄊㄨˇ ㄙ)) (AD 1383–?) – Ruled by the House of Yan (奄) of Yi descent
- Chiefdom of Lower Jiangzui (下江嘴土司(ㄒㄧㄚˋ ㄐㄧㄤ ㄗㄨㄟˇ ㄊㄨˇ ㄙ)) (AD 1383–?) – Ruled by the House of He (何) of Bai descent
- Chiefdom of Jianganchang (箭桿場土司(ㄐㄧㄢˋ ㄍㄢˇ ㄔㄤˇ ㄊㄨˇ ㄙ)) (AD 1383–?) – Ruled by the House of Zi (字) of Yi descent
- Chiefdom of Manshenzhai (蔓神寨土司(ㄇㄢˋ ㄕㄣˊ ㄓㄞˋ ㄊㄨˇ ㄙ)) (AD 1383–?) – Ruled by the House of Dong (董) of Bai descent
- Chiefdom of Shanjingyanjing (山井鹽井土司(ㄕㄢ ㄐㄧㄥˇ ㄧㄢˊ ㄐㄧㄥˇ ㄊㄨˇ ㄙ)) (AD 1383–?) – Ruled by the House of Yang (楊) of Bai descent
- Chiefdom of Jujin Prefecture (巨津州土司(ㄐㄩˋ ㄐㄧㄣ ㄓㄡ ㄊㄨˇ ㄙ)) (AD 1383–?) – Ruled by the House of A (阿) of Nakhi descent
- Chiefdom of Ami Prefecture (阿迷州土司(ㄚ ㄇㄧˊ ㄓㄡ ㄊㄨˇ ㄙ)) (AD 1383–?) – Ruled by the House of Pu (普) of Yi descent
- Chiefdom of Mishayanjing (彌沙鹽井土司(ㄇㄧˊ ㄕㄚ ㄧㄢˊ ㄐㄧㄥˇ ㄊㄨˇ ㄙ)) (AD 1383–?) – Ruled by the House of He (何) of Bai descent
- Chiefdom of Lianxiangguan (煉象關土司(ㄌㄧㄢˋ ㄒㄧㄤˋ ㄍㄨㄢ ㄊㄨˇ ㄙ)) (AD 1383–?) – Ruled by the House of Li (李) of Yi descent
- Chiefdom of Nanpingguan (南平關土司(ㄋㄢˊ ㄆㄧㄥˊ ㄍㄨㄢ ㄊㄨˇ ㄙ)) (AD 1383–?) – Ruled by the House of Li (李) of Yi descent
- Chiefdom of Pindian (品甸土司(ㄆㄧㄣˇ ㄉㄧㄢˋ ㄊㄨˇ ㄙ)) (AD 1383–?) – Ruled by the House of Du (杜) of Bai descent
- Chiefdom of Nidian (你甸土司(ㄋㄧˇ ㄉㄧㄢˋ ㄊㄨˇ ㄙ)) (AD 1383–?) – Ruled by the House of Li (李) of Bai descent
- Chiefdom of Putuokong (普陀崆土司(ㄆㄨˇ ㄊㄨㄛˊ ㄎㄨㄥ ㄊㄨˇ ㄙ)) (AD 1383–?) – Ruled by the House of Yang (楊) of Bai descent
- Chiefdom of Yaozhou (姚州土司(ㄧㄠˊ ㄓㄡ ㄊㄨˇ ㄙ)) (AD 1383–?) – Ruled by the House of Gao (高) of Bai descent
- Lanzhou Tuzhizhou (蘭州土知州(ㄌㄢˊ ㄓㄡ ㄊㄨˇ ㄓ ㄓㄡ)) (AD 1383–?) – Ruled by the House of Luo (羅) of Bai descent
- Shimenguan Tuxunjian (石門關土巡檢(ㄕˊ ㄇㄣˊ ㄍㄨㄢ ㄊㄨˇ ㄒㄩㄣˊ ㄐㄧㄢˇ)) (AD 1383–?) – Ruled by the House of A (阿) of Nakhi descent
- Chuxiong Tuxunjian (楚雄土巡檢(ㄔㄨˇ ㄒㄩㄥˊ ㄊㄨˇ ㄒㄩㄣˊ ㄐㄧㄢˇ)) (AD 1383–?) – Ruled by the House of Na (納)
- Yunnan County Tuxiancheng (雲南縣土縣丞(ㄩㄣˊ ㄋㄢˊ ㄒㄧㄢˋ ㄊㄨˇ ㄒㄧㄢˋ ㄔㄥˊ)) (AD 1383–?) – Ruled by the House of Yang (楊) of Bai descent
- Zhennan Prefecture Tutongzhi (鎮南州土同知(ㄓㄣˋ ㄋㄢˊ ㄓㄡ ㄊㄨˇ ㄊㄨㄥˊ ㄓ)) (AD 1383–?) – Ruled by the House of Duan (段) of Bai descent
- Chiefdom of Malongtalangdian (馬龍他郎甸土司(ㄇㄚˇ ㄌㄨㄥˊ ㄊㄚ ㄌㄤˊ ㄉㄧㄢˋ ㄊㄨˇ ㄙ)) (AD 1384–1501) – Ruled by the House of Pu (普) of Yi descent
- Chiefdom of Dingxiling (定西嶺土司(ㄉㄧㄥˋ ㄒㄧ ㄌㄧㄥˇ ㄊㄨˇ ㄙ)) (AD 1384–?) – Ruled by the House of Li (李) of Yi descent
- Heqing Tuzhifu (鶴慶土知府(ㄏㄜˋ ㄑㄧㄥˋ ㄊㄨˇ ㄓ ㄈㄨˇ)) (AD 1384–?) – Ruled by the House of Dong (董) of Bai descent
- Chuxiong County Tuzhubu (楚雄縣土主簿(ㄔㄨˇ ㄒㄩㄥˊ ㄒㄧㄢˋ ㄊㄨˇ ㄓㄨˇ ㄅㄨˋ)) (AD 1384–?) – Ruled by the House of Pu (普) of Yi descent
- Yunnan County Tuzhubu (雲南縣土主簿(ㄩㄣˊ ㄋㄢˊ ㄒㄧㄢˋ ㄊㄨˇ ㄓㄨˇ ㄅㄨˋ)) (AD 1384–?) – Ruled by the House of Zhang (張) of Bai descent
- Chiefdom of Gelatang (葛剌湯土司(ㄍㄜˇ ㄌㄚˋ ㄊㄤ ㄊㄨˇ ㄙ)) (AD 1385–?)
- Chiefdom of Shalu (沙魯土司(ㄕㄚ ㄌㄨˇ ㄊㄨˇ ㄙ)) (AD 1385–?)
- Chiefdom of Chishuipeng (赤水鵬土司(ㄔˋ ㄕㄨㄟˇ ㄆㄥˊ ㄊㄨˇ ㄙ)) (AD 1385–?) – Ruled by the House of Ma (馬) of Hui descent
- Chiefdom of Greater Pingfa (大平伐土司(ㄉㄚˋ ㄆㄧㄥˊ ㄈㄚˊ ㄊㄨˇ ㄙ)) (AD 1386–?)
- Jianchuan Prefecture Tuzhizhou (劍川州土知州(ㄐㄧㄢˋ ㄔㄨㄢ ㄓㄡ ㄊㄨˇ ㄓ ㄓㄡ)) (AD 1386–?) – Ruled by the House of Yang (楊) of Bai descent
- Chiefdom of Abangxiang (阿邦鄉土司(ㄚ ㄅㄤ ㄒㄧㄤ ㄊㄨˇ ㄙ)) (AD 1387–?) – Ruled by the House of Tao (陶) of Bai descent
- Chiefdom of Yangyi (楊義土司(ㄧㄤˊ ㄧˋ ㄊㄨˇ ㄙ)) (AD 1388–?) – Ruled by the House of Jin (金)
- Chiefdom of Nandian (南甸土司(ㄋㄢˊ ㄉㄧㄢˋ ㄊㄨˇ ㄙ)) (AD 1389–1950) – Ruled by the House of Dao (刀) of Dai descent
- Chiefdom of Fengxi (鳳溪土司(ㄈㄥˋ ㄒㄧ ㄊㄨˇ ㄙ)) (AD 1390–1659)
- Shimenguan Tuqianfuzhang (石門關土千夫長(ㄕˊ ㄇㄣˊ ㄍㄨㄢ ㄊㄨˇ ㄑㄧㄢ ㄈㄨ ㄓㄤˇ)) (AD 1391–?) – Ruled by the House of Mu (木) of Nakhi descent
- Babai Dadian Xuanweisi (八百大甸宣慰司(ㄅㄚ ㄅㄞˇ ㄉㄚˋ ㄉㄧㄢˋ ㄒㄩㄢ ㄨㄟˋ ㄙ)) (AD 1391–?)
- Chiefdom of Lianxiangguan (煉象關土司(ㄌㄧㄢˋ ㄒㄧㄤˋ ㄍㄨㄢ ㄊㄨˇ ㄙ)) (AD 1393–?) – Ruled by the House of Wang (王)
- Chiefdom of Pingyi County (平彝縣土司(ㄆㄧㄥˊ ㄧˊ ㄒㄧㄢˋ ㄊㄨˇ ㄙ)) (AD 1394–?) – Ruled by the House of Hai (海) of Yi descent
- Mengzi County Tuzhixian (蒙自縣土知縣(ㄇㄥˊ ㄗˋ ㄒㄧㄢˋ ㄊㄨˇ ㄓ ㄒㄧㄢˋ)) (AD 1394–?) – Ruled by the House of Lu (祿) of Yi descent
- Chiefdom of Yuezhou (越州土司(ㄩㄝˋ ㄓㄡ ㄊㄨˇ ㄙ)) (AD 1395–?) – Ruled by the House of Long (龍) of Yi descent
- Chiefdom of Danping (丹平土司(ㄉㄢ ㄆㄧㄥˊ ㄊㄨˇ ㄙ)) (AD 1397–?, AD 1403–1663)
- Chiefdom of Gengma (耿馬土司(ㄍㄥˇ ㄇㄚˇ ㄊㄨˇ ㄙ)) (AD 1397–1950) – Ruled by the House of Han (罕) of Dai descent
- Oirat state (瓦剌(ㄨㄚˇ ㄌㄚˋ)) (AD 1399–1634) – Ruled by the House of Choros (綽羅斯) of Mongol descent
  - Dzungar Khanate (準噶爾汗國(ㄓㄨㄣˇ ㄍㄚˊ ㄦˇ ㄏㄢˊ ㄍㄨㄛˊ)) (AD 1634–1757)
- Dughlat tribe (杜格拉特部(ㄉㄨˋ ㄍㄜˊ ㄌㄚ ㄊㄜˋ ㄅㄨˋ)) (AD 14th century–16th century)
- Chiefdom of Dongxiangwulu (東鄉五路土司(ㄉㄨㄥ ㄒㄧㄤ ㄨˇ ㄌㄨˋ ㄊㄨˇ ㄙ)) (AD 14th century–1732) – Ruled by the House of Tan (覃) of Tujia descent
- Möng Lem (孟璉(ㄇㄥˋ ㄌㄧㄢˇ)) (AD 14th century–19th century)
- Möng Yang (孟養(ㄇㄥˋ ㄧㄤˇ)) (AD 14th century–19th century)
- Dujie Aboriginal Prefecture (都結土州(ㄉㄨ ㄐㄧㄝˊ ㄊㄨˇ ㄓㄡ)) (AD 14th century–1916) – Ruled by the House of Nong (農)
- Xiangwu Aboriginal Prefecture (向武土州(ㄒㄧㄤˋ ㄨˇ ㄊㄨˇ ㄓㄡ)) (AD 14th century–1917)
- Dukang Aboriginal Prefecture (都康土州(ㄉㄨ ㄎㄤ ㄊㄨˇ ㄓㄡ)) (AD 14th century–1917)
- Anping Aboriginal Prefecture (安平土州(ㄢ ㄆㄧㄥˊ ㄊㄨˇ ㄓㄡ)) (AD 14th century–1928) – Ruled by the House of Li (李)
- Chiefdom of A (阿土司(ㄚ ㄊㄨˇ ㄙ)) (AD 14th century–1931) – Ruled by the House of A (阿) of Tu descent
- Hor States (五霍爾(ㄨˇ ㄏㄨㄛˋ ㄦˇ)) (AD 14th century–20th century)
  - Khangsar (康薩(ㄎㄤ ㄙㄚˋ)) (?–?)
  - Mazur (馬蘇(ㄇㄚˇ ㄙㄨ)) (?–?)
  - Drango (特郎哥(ㄊㄜˋ ㄌㄤˊ ㄍㄜ)) (?–?)
  - Beri (彼里(ㄅㄧˇ ㄌㄧˇ)) (?–?)
  - Trehor (哲霍(ㄓㄜˊ ㄏㄨㄛˋ)) (?–?)
- Chiefdom of Longdawei (隴答衛土司(ㄌㄨㄥˇ ㄉㄚˊ ㄨㄟˋ ㄊㄨˇ ㄙ)) (AD 14th century–?)
- Chiefdom of Fuzhou (富州土司(ㄈㄨˋ ㄓㄡ ㄊㄨˇ ㄙ)) (AD 14th century–?) – Ruled by the House of Shen (沈) of Zhuang descent
- Chiefdom of Luokongdian (落恐甸土司(ㄌㄨㄛˋ ㄎㄨㄥˇ ㄉㄧㄢˋ ㄊㄨˇ ㄙ)) (AD 14th century–?) – Ruled by the House of Chen (陳) of Hani descent
- Chiefdom of Zuonengzhai (左能寨土司(ㄗㄨㄛˇ ㄋㄥˊ ㄓㄞˋ ㄊㄨˇ ㄙ)) (AD 14th century–?) – Ruled by the House of Wu (吳) of Hani descent
- Shi'erguan Tufuzhangguan (十二關土副長官(ㄕˊ ㄦˋ ㄍㄨㄢ ㄊㄨˇ ㄈㄨˋ ㄓㄤˇ ㄍㄨㄢ)) (AD 14th century–?) – Ruled by the House of Li (李) of Bai descent
- Jianchuan Prefecture Tuqianhu (劍川州土千戶(ㄐㄧㄢˋ ㄔㄨㄢ ㄓㄡ ㄊㄨˇ ㄑㄧㄢ ㄏㄨˋ)) (AD 14th century–?) – Ruled by the House of Zhao (趙) of Bai descent
- Chiefdom of Luoci County (羅次縣土司(ㄌㄨㄛˊ ㄘˋ ㄒㄧㄢˋ ㄊㄨˇ ㄙ)) (AD 1400–?) – Ruled by the House of Yang (楊) of Bai descent
- Miandian Xuanweisi (緬甸宣慰司(ㄇㄧㄢˇ ㄉㄧㄢˋ ㄒㄩㄢ ㄨㄟˋ ㄙ)) (AD 1403–1526)
- Chiefdom of Qingshuijiang (青水江土司(ㄑㄧㄥ ㄕㄨㄟˇ ㄐㄧㄤ ㄊㄨˇ ㄙ)) (AD 1404–?) – Ruled by the House of Li (李)
- Babai Zhenai Xuanweisi (八百者乃宣慰司(ㄅㄚ ㄅㄞˇ ㄓㄜˇ ㄋㄞˇ ㄒㄩㄢ ㄨㄟˋ ㄙ)) (AD 1404–?)
- Yizuo County Tubashi (亦佐縣土把事(ㄧˋ ㄗㄨㄛˇ ㄒㄧㄢˋ ㄊㄨˇ ㄅㄚˇ ㄕˋ)) (AD 1405–?) – Ruled by the House of Liu (劉) of Yi descent and the House of Bo (博) of Yi descent
- Hulun (扈倫(ㄏㄨˋ ㄌㄨㄣˊ)) (AD 1406–1619) – Ruled by the House of Nara (那拉) of Jurchen descent
  - Ula (烏拉(ㄨ ㄌㄚ)) (AD 1561–1613) – Ruled by the House of Ula Nara (烏拉那拉) of Jurchen descent
  - Hoifa (輝發(ㄏㄨㄟ ㄈㄚ)) (AD 16th century–1607) – Ruled by the House of Hoifa Nara (輝發那拉) of Jurchen descent
  - Hada (哈達(ㄏㄚ ㄉㄚˊ)) (AD 16th century–17th century) – Ruled by the House of Hada Nara (哈達那拉) of Jurchen descent
  - Yehe (葉赫(ㄧㄝˋ ㄏㄜˋ)) (?–AD 1619) – Ruled by the House of Yehe Nara (葉赫那拉) of Jurchen descent
    - Beile of Western City of Yehe (葉赫西城貝勒(ㄧㄝˋ ㄏㄜˋ ㄒㄧ ㄔㄥˊ ㄅㄟˋ ㄌㄜˋ)) (?–AD 1619)
    - Beile of Eastern City of Yehe (葉赫東城貝勒(ㄧㄝˋ ㄏㄜˋ ㄉㄨㄥ ㄔㄥˊ ㄅㄟˋ ㄌㄜˋ)) (?–AD 1619)
- Chiefdom of Chashan (茶山土司(ㄔㄚˊ ㄕㄢ ㄊㄨˇ ㄙ)) (AD 1406–?)
- Chiefdom of Lahezhuang (剌和莊土司(ㄌㄚˋ ㄏㄜˊ ㄓㄨㄤ ㄊㄨˇ ㄙ)) (AD 1406–?)
- Chiefdom of Lesser Gula (小古剌土司(ㄒㄧㄠˇ ㄍㄨˇ ㄌㄚˋ ㄊㄨˇ ㄙ)) (AD 1406–?) – Ruled by the House of Bai (拜)
- Chiefdom of Greater Gula (大古剌土司(ㄉㄚˋ ㄍㄨˇ ㄌㄚˋ ㄊㄨˇ ㄙ)) (AD 1406–?)
- Chiefdom of Diban (底板土司(ㄉㄧˇ ㄅㄢˇ ㄊㄨˇ ㄙ)) (AD 1406–?)
- Chiefdom of Yangtang (楊塘土司(ㄧㄤˊ ㄊㄤˊ ㄊㄨˇ ㄙ)) (AD 1406–?)
- Chiefdom of Yuji (鬱即土司(ㄩˋ ㄐㄧˊ ㄊㄨˇ ㄙ)) (AD 1406–?)
- Chiefdom of Bajiata (八家塔土司(ㄅㄚ ㄐㄧㄚ ㄊㄚˇ ㄊㄨˇ ㄙ)) (AD 1406–?)
- Chiefdom of Dimasa (底馬撒土司(ㄉㄧˇ ㄇㄚˇ ㄙㄚ ㄊㄨˇ ㄙ)) (AD 1406–?)
- Chiefdom of Jiugang (舊港土司(ㄐㄧㄡˋ ㄍㄤˇ ㄊㄨˇ ㄙ)) (AD 1407–?) – Ruled by the House of Shi (施) of Han descent
- Chiefdom of Cuwa (促瓦土司(ㄘㄨˋ ㄨㄚˇ ㄊㄨˇ ㄙ)) (AD 1407–?)
- Chiefdom of Sanjin (散金土司(ㄙㄢˋ ㄐㄧㄣ ㄊㄨˇ ㄙ)) (AD 1407–?)
- Chiefdom of Lima (里麻土司(ㄌㄧˇ ㄇㄚˊ ㄊㄨˇ ㄙ)) (AD 1408–?)
- Chiefdom of Zhenkang (鎮康土司(ㄓㄣˋ ㄎㄤ ㄊㄨˇ ㄙ)) (AD 1408–1907) – Ruled by the House of Daomen (刀悶) of Dai descent
  - Chiefdom of Yongde (永德土司(ㄩㄥˇ ㄉㄜˊ ㄊㄨˇ ㄙ)) (?–?)
- Chiefdom of Zhuoyou (着由土司(ㄓㄨㄛˊ ㄧㄡˊ ㄊㄨˇ ㄙ)) (AD 1409–?)
- Chiefdom of Dongbuhanhu (董卜韓胡土司(ㄉㄨㄥˇ ㄅㄨˇ ㄏㄢˊ ㄏㄨˊ ㄊㄨˇ ㄙ)) (AD 1415–?)
- Chiefdom of Moshale (摩沙勒土司(ㄇㄛˊ ㄕㄚ ㄌㄜˋ ㄊㄨˇ ㄙ)) (AD 1416–1665) – Ruled by the House of Pu (普) of Yi descent
- Chiefdom of Zhuoni (卓尼土司(ㄓㄨㄛˊ ㄋㄧˊ ㄊㄨˇ ㄙ)) (AD 1418–1949) – Ruled by the House of Yang (楊) of Tibetan descent
- Chiefdom of Chelijing'an (車里靖安土司(ㄔㄜ ㄌㄧˇ ㄐㄧㄥˋ ㄢ ㄊㄨˇ ㄙ)) (AD 1421–?) – Ruled by the House of Dao (刀)
- Chiefdom of Diwula (底兀剌土司(ㄉㄧˇ ㄨˋ ㄌㄚˋ ㄊㄨˇ ㄙ)) (AD 1424–?)
- Chiefdom of Hemocun (禾摩村土司(ㄏㄜˊ ㄇㄛˊ ㄘㄨㄣ ㄊㄨˇ ㄙ)) (AD 1424–?) – Ruled by the House of Wang (王)
- Xincheng Aboriginal County (忻城土縣(ㄒㄧㄣ ㄔㄥˊ ㄊㄨˇ ㄒㄧㄢˋ)) (AD 1427–1928)
- Yizuo County Tuxiancheng (亦佐縣土縣丞(ㄧˋ ㄗㄨㄛˇ ㄒㄧㄢˋ ㄊㄨˇ ㄒㄧㄢˋ ㄔㄥˊ)) (AD 1427–?) – Ruled by the House of Sha (沙) of Yi descent
- Chiefdom of Ma'erza (麻兒匝土司(ㄇㄚˊ ㄦˊ ㄗㄚ ㄊㄨˇ ㄙ)) (AD 1427–?)
- Xi'e County Tuzhubu (嶍峨縣土主簿(ㄒㄧˊ ㄝˊ ㄒㄧㄢˋ ㄊㄨˇ ㄓㄨˇ ㄅㄨˋ)) (AD 1428–?) – Ruled by the House of Wang (王)
- Yangli Aboriginal Prefecture (養利土州(ㄧㄤˇ ㄌㄧˋ ㄊㄨˇ ㄓㄡ)) (?–AD 1431) – Ruled by the House of Zhao (趙)
- Chongshan Aboriginal County (崇善土縣(ㄔㄨㄥˊ ㄕㄢˋ ㄊㄨˇ ㄒㄧㄢˋ)) (?–AD 1433) – Ruled by the House of Zhao (趙)
- Chiefdom of Songshaopu (松韶鋪土司(ㄙㄨㄥ ㄕㄠˊ ㄆㄨˋ ㄊㄨˇ ㄙ)) (AD 1434–?) – Ruled by the House of Li (李)
- Rinpungpa (仁蚌巴(ㄖㄣˊ ㄅㄤˋ ㄅㄚ)) (AD 1435–1565) – Ruled by the House of sGer (格爾) of Tibetan descent
- Chiefdom of Asicu (阿思簇土司(ㄚ ㄙ ㄘㄨˋ ㄊㄨˇ ㄙ)) (AD 1435–?)
- Dahou Prefecture Tuzhizhou (大侯州土知州(ㄉㄚˋ ㄏㄡˊ ㄓㄡ ㄊㄨˇ ㄓ ㄓㄡ)) (AD 1438–?) – Ruled by the House of Feng (奉) of Dai descent
- Chiefdom of Guansuoling (關索嶺土司(ㄍㄨㄢ ㄙㄨㄛˇ ㄌㄧㄥˇ ㄊㄨˇ ㄙ)) (AD 1439–?) – Ruled by the House of Li (李)
- Chiefdom of Mang'erzhe (芒兒者土司(ㄇㄤˊ ㄦˊ ㄓㄜˇ ㄊㄨˇ ㄙ)) (AD 1440–?)
- Chiefdom of Qujing (曲靖土司(ㄑㄩ ㄐㄧㄥˋ ㄊㄨˇ ㄙ)) (AD 1441–?) – Ruled by the House of Gong (恭) of Dai descent
- Lijiang Tuzhaomo (麗江土照磨(ㄌㄧˋ ㄐㄧㄤ ㄊㄨˇ ㄓㄠˋ ㄇㄛˊ)) (AD 1441–?) – Ruled by the House of Mu (木) of Nakhi descent
- Chiefdom of Jinningyi (晉寧驛土司(ㄐㄧㄣˋ ㄋㄧㄥˊ ㄧˋ ㄊㄨˇ ㄙ)) (AD 1442–?) – Ruled by the House of Lu (陸) of Yi descent
- Chiefdom of Mangshi (芒市土司(ㄇㄤˊ ㄕˋ ㄊㄨˇ ㄙ)) (AD 1443–1955) – Ruled by the House of Fang (放) of Dai descent
- Chiefdom of Tieluguan (鐵爐關土司(ㄊㄧㄝˇ ㄌㄨˊ ㄍㄨㄢ ㄊㄨˇ ㄙ)) (AD 1443–?) – Ruled by the House of Wang (王)
- Chiefdom of Longchuan (隴川土司(ㄌㄨㄥˇ ㄔㄨㄢ ㄊㄨˇ ㄙ)) (AD 1444–?) – Ruled by the House of Duo (多)
- Chiefdom of Sinangri (思囊日土司(ㄙ ㄋㄤˊ ㄖˋ ㄊㄨˇ ㄙ)) (AD 1446–?)
- Namgyal dynasty of Ladakh (拉達克南嘉王朝(ㄌㄚ ㄉㄚˊ ㄎㄜˋ ㄋㄢˊ ㄐㄧㄚ ㄨㄤˊ ㄔㄠˊ)) (AD 1460–1842) – Ruled by the House of Namgyal (南嘉)
- Chiefdom of Dongshankou (東山口土司(ㄉㄨㄥ ㄕㄢ ㄎㄡˇ ㄊㄨˇ ㄙ)) (AD 1464–?) – Ruled by the House of Pu (普) of Yi descent and the House of Zhang (張) of Yi descent
- Chiefdom of Nagengshan (納更山土司(ㄋㄚˋ ㄍㄥ ㄕㄢ ㄊㄨˇ ㄙ)) (AD 1482–?) – Ruled by the House of Long (龍) of Hani descent
- Chiefdom of Möng Mit (孟密土司(ㄇㄥˋ ㄇㄧˋ ㄊㄨˇ ㄙ)) (AD 1484–?) – Ruled by the House of Si (思) of Dai descent
- Chiefdom of Yongding (永定土司(ㄩㄥˇ ㄉㄧㄥˋ ㄊㄨˇ ㄙ)) (AD 1486–1927)
- Yongshun Zheng Tuzhangguansi (永順正土長官司(ㄩㄥˇ ㄕㄨㄣˋ ㄓㄥˋ ㄊㄨˇ ㄓㄤˇ ㄍㄨㄢ ㄙ)) (AD 1492–1928) – Ruled by the House of Deng (鄧)
- Yongshun Fu Tuzhangguansi (永順副土長官司(ㄩㄥˇ ㄕㄨㄣˋ ㄈㄨˋ ㄊㄨˇ ㄓㄤˇ ㄍㄨㄢ ㄙ)) (AD 1492–1928) – Ruled by the House of Peng (彭)
- Luhtu (魯富都(ㄌㄨˇ ㄈㄨˋ ㄉㄨ)) (AD 15th century–1920) – Ruled by the House of Yulunana (優路拿納) of Tsou descent
- Kingdom of Derge (德格王國(ㄉㄜˊ ㄍㄜˊ ㄨㄤˊ ㄍㄨㄛˊ)) (AD 15th century–1956) – Ruled by the House of mGar (噶爾) of Tibetan descent
- Zuozhou Aboriginal Prefecture (左州土州(ㄗㄨㄛˇ ㄓㄡ ㄊㄨˇ ㄓㄡ)) (?–AD 15th century) – Ruled by the House of Huang (黃)
- Chiefdom of Tangchi (湯池土司(ㄇㄥˇ ㄇㄧㄢˇ ㄊㄨˇ ㄙ)) (AD 15th century–?) – Ruled by the House of Ma (馬) of Hui descent

==== Modern Era ====
- Chiefdom of Dingluo (定羅土司(ㄉㄧㄥˋ ㄌㄨㄛˊ ㄊㄨˇ ㄙ)) (AD 1528–1912) – Ruled by the House of Xu (徐) of Zhuang descent
- Chiefdom of Guling (古零土司(ㄍㄨˇ ㄌㄧㄥˊ ㄊㄨˇ ㄙ)) (AD 1528–1915) – Ruled by the House of Tan (覃)
- Chiefdom of Jiucheng (舊城土司(ㄐㄧㄡˋ ㄔㄥˊ ㄊㄨˇ ㄙ)) (AD 1528–1915)
- Chiefdom of Xiawang (下旺土司(ㄒㄧㄚˋ ㄨㄤˋ ㄊㄨˇ ㄙ)) (AD 1528–1918)
- Tsangpa (藏巴王朝(ㄗㄤˋ ㄅㄚ ㄨㄤˊ ㄔㄠˊ)) (AD 1565–1642)
- Chiefdom of Manmo (蠻莫土司(ㄇㄢˊ ㄇㄛˋ ㄊㄨˇ ㄙ)) (AD 1585–?)
- Chiefdom of Qieluoguan (伽羅關土司(ㄑㄧㄝˊ ㄌㄨㄛˊ ㄍㄨㄢ ㄊㄨˇ ㄙ)) (AD 1591–?) – Ruled by the House of Yi (易)
- Chiefdom of Mengmian (猛緬土司(ㄇㄥˇ ㄇㄧㄢˇ ㄊㄨˇ ㄙ)) (AD 1593–?) – Ruled by the House of Feng (奉) of Dai descent
- Chiefdom of Damengma (大猛麻土司(ㄉㄚˋ ㄇㄥˇ ㄇㄚˊ ㄊㄨˇ ㄙ)) (AD 1594–?) – Ruled by the House of Feng (奉) of Dai descent
- Sitong Aboriginal Prefecture (思同土州(ㄙ ㄊㄨㄥˊ ㄊㄨˇ ㄓㄡ)) (?–AD 1599) – Ruled by the House of Huang (黃)
- Chiefdom of Mengmeng (猛猛土司(ㄇㄥˇ ㄇㄥˇ ㄊㄨˇ ㄙ)) (AD 1599–?) – Ruled by the House of Feng (奉) of Dai descent
- Khoshut tribe (和碩特部(ㄏㄜˊ ㄕㄨㄛˋ ㄊㄜˋ ㄅㄨˋ)) (AD 16th century–1724) – Ruled by the House of Borjigin (孛兒只斤) of Mongol descent
  - Khoshut Khanate (和碩特汗國(ㄏㄜˊ ㄕㄨㄛˋ ㄊㄜˋ ㄏㄢˊ ㄍㄨㄛˊ)) (AD 1642–1717)
- Chiefdom of Xinglong (興隆土司(ㄒㄧㄥ ㄌㄨㄥˊ ㄊㄨˇ ㄙ)) (AD 16th century–1915) – Ruled by the House of Wei (韋)
- Chiefdom of Duyang (都陽土司(ㄉㄨ ㄧㄤˊ ㄊㄨˇ ㄙ)) (AD 16th century–1915)
- Chiefdom of Anding (安定土司(ㄢ ㄉㄧㄥˋ ㄊㄨˇ ㄙ)) (AD 16th century–1915) – Ruled by the House of Pan (潘)
- Chiefdom of Zhefang (遮放土司(ㄓㄜ ㄈㄤˋ ㄊㄨˇ ㄙ)) (AD 16th century–1955) – Ruled by the House of Duo (多) of Dai descent
- Chiefdom of Menghan (勐罕土司(ㄇㄥˇ ㄏㄢˇ ㄊㄨˇ ㄙ)) (AD 1606–1950) – Ruled by the House of Shao (召) of Dai descent
- Chiefdom of Mengmao (勐卯土司(ㄇㄥˇ ㄇㄠˇ ㄊㄨˇ ㄙ)) (AD 1611–1955) – Ruled by the House of Kan (衎) of Dai descent
- Chiefdom of Zhanyi Prefecture (沾益州土司(ㄓㄢ ㄧˋ ㄓㄡ ㄊㄨˇ ㄙ)) (AD 1623–?) – Ruled by the House of An (安) of Yi descent
- Chiefdom of Douyanzhai (斗岩寨土司(ㄉㄡˇ ㄧㄢˊ ㄓㄞˋ ㄊㄨˇ ㄙ)) (AD 1632–?) – Ruled by the House of Li (李) of Hani descent
- Qing dynasty (清朝(ㄑㄧㄥ ㄔㄠˊ)) (AD 1636–1912) – Ruled by the House of Aisin Gioro (愛新覺羅) of Manchu descent
  - Later Jin (後金(ㄏㄡˋ ㄐㄧㄣ)) (AD 1616–1636)
- Chiefdom of Atuzhai (阿土寨土司(ㄚ ㄊㄨˇ ㄓㄞˋ ㄊㄨˇ ㄙ)) (AD 1637–?) – Ruled by the House of Tao (陶) of Dai descent
- Chiefdom of Shuitangzhai (水塘寨土司(ㄕㄨㄟˇ ㄊㄤˊ ㄓㄞˋ ㄊㄨˇ ㄙ)) (AD 1639–?) – Ruled by the House of Tao (陶) of Dai descent
- Chiefdom of Mengsuozhai (猛梭寨土司(ㄇㄥˇ ㄙㄨㄛ ㄓㄞˋ ㄊㄨˇ ㄙ)) (AD 1640–1954) – Ruled by the House of Dao (刀) of Dai descent
- Xi dynasty (西朝(ㄒㄧ ㄔㄠˊ)) (AD 1643–1647) – Ruled by the House of Zhang (張) of Han descent
- Shun dynasty (順朝(ㄕㄨㄣˋ ㄔㄠˊ)) (AD 1644–1646) – Ruled by the House of Li (李) of Tangut descent
- Chiefdom of Muli (木里土司(ㄇㄨˋ ㄌㄧˇ ㄊㄨˇ ㄙ)) (AD 1648–1952) – Ruled by the House of Xiang (項) of Pumi descent
- Chiefdom of Menglazhai (猛喇寨土司(ㄇㄥˇ ㄌㄚˇ ㄓㄞˋ ㄊㄨˇ ㄙ)) (AD 1658–?) – Ruled by the House of Dao (刀) of Dai descent
- Chiefdom of Wumuzhai (五畝寨土司(ㄨˇ ㄇㄨˇ ㄓㄞˋ ㄊㄨˇ ㄙ)) (AD 1658–?) – Ruled by the House of Tao (陶) of Dai descent
- Chiefdom of Wubangzhai (五邦寨土司(ㄨˇ ㄅㄤ ㄓㄞˋ ㄊㄨˇ ㄙ)) (AD 1658–?) – Ruled by the House of Dao (刀) of Dai descent
- Kingdom of Tungning (東寧(ㄉㄨㄥ ㄋㄧㄥˊ)) (AD 1661–1683) – Ruled by the House of Zheng (鄭) of Han descent, although nominally under the House of Zhu
- Chiefdom of Ami Prefecture (阿迷州土司(ㄚ ㄇㄧˊ ㄓㄡ ㄊㄨˇ ㄙ)) (AD 1665–?) – Ruled by the House of Li (李) of Yi descent
- Yizuo County Tuzhixian (亦佐縣土知縣(ㄧˋ ㄗㄨㄛˇ ㄒㄧㄢˋ ㄊㄨˇ ㄓ ㄒㄧㄢˋ)) (AD 1669–?) – Ruled by the House of Sha (沙) of Yi descent
- Wu Zhou (吳周(ㄨˊ ㄓㄡ)) (AD 1678–1681) – Ruled by the House of Wu (吳) of Han descent
- Chiefdom of Xinxing Prefecture (新興州土司(ㄒㄧㄣ ㄒㄧㄥ ㄓㄡ ㄊㄨˇ ㄙ)) (AD 1680–?) – Ruled by the House of Wang (王)
- Ningzhou Tuzhoupan (寧州土州判(ㄋㄧㄥˊ ㄓㄡ ㄊㄨˇ ㄓㄡ ㄆㄢˋ)) (AD 1680–?) – Ruled by the House of Li (李) of Yi descent
- Chiefdom of Zhemizhai (者米寨土司(ㄓㄜˇ ㄇㄧˇ ㄓㄞˋ ㄊㄨˇ ㄙ)) (AD 1682–?) – Ruled by the House of Wang (王)
- Chiefdom of Mengdingzhai (猛丁寨土司(ㄇㄥˇ ㄉㄧㄥ ㄓㄞˋ ㄊㄨˇ ㄙ)) (AD 1694–?) – Ruled by the House of Zhang (張) of Hani descent
- Lanzhou Tushe (蘭州土舍(ㄌㄢˊ ㄓㄡ ㄊㄨˇ ㄕㄜˇ)) (AD 1694–?) – Ruled by the House of Luo (羅) of Bai descent
- Kumul Khanate (哈密汗國(ㄏㄚ ㄇㄧˋ ㄏㄢˊ ㄍㄨㄛˊ)) (AD 1696–1930) – Ruled by the House of Borjigin (孛兒只斤) of Mongol descent
- Chiefdom of Shaxi (沙溪土司(ㄕㄚ ㄒㄧ ㄊㄨˇ ㄙ)) (AD 17th century–1735) – Ruled by the House of Huang (黃) of Tujia descent
- Seqalu (瑯𤩝十八社(ㄌㄤˊ ㄑㄧㄠˊ ㄕˊ ㄅㄚ ㄕㄜˋ)) (AD 17th century–1904) – Ruled by the House of Garuljigulj (卡珞利谷) of Puyuma descent
- Tjaquvuquvulj (大龜文(ㄉㄚˋ ㄍㄨㄟ ㄨㄣˊ)) (AD 17th century–1930) – Co-ruled by the House of Ruvaniyaw (邏伐尼耀) and the House of Tjuleng (鳩冷) of Paiwan descent
- Chiefdom of Bathang (巴塘土司(ㄅㄚ ㄊㄤˊ ㄊㄨˇ ㄙ)) (AD 1719–1906)
- Chiefdom of Lithang (理塘土司(ㄌㄧˇ ㄊㄤˊ ㄊㄨˇ ㄙ)) (AD 1719–1906) – Ruled by the House of Wang (汪) of Gyalrong descent
- Chiefdom of Mengbangzhai (猛蚌寨土司(ㄇㄥˇ ㄅㄤˋ ㄓㄞˋ ㄊㄨˇ ㄙ)) (AD 1726–?) – Ruled by the House of Dao (刀) of Dai descent
- Chiefdom of Menglaizhai (猛賴寨土司(ㄇㄥˇ ㄌㄞˋ ㄓㄞˋ ㄊㄨˇ ㄙ)) (AD 1726–?) – Ruled by the House of Dao (刀) of Dai descent
- Chiefdom of Sangzhi (桑植土司(ㄙㄤ ㄓˊ ㄊㄨˇ ㄙ)) (?–AD 1727) – Ruled by the House of Xiang (向) of Tujia descent
- Chiefdom of Upper Zhandui (上瞻對土司(ㄕㄤˋ ㄓㄢ ㄉㄨㄟˋ ㄊㄨˇ ㄙ)) (AD 1728–?)
- Chiefdom of Lower Zhandui (下瞻對土司(ㄒㄧㄚˋ ㄓㄢ ㄉㄨㄟˋ ㄊㄨˇ ㄙ)) (AD 1728–?)
- Chiefdom of Mashu (麻書土司(ㄇㄚˊ ㄕㄨ ㄊㄨˇ ㄙ)) (AD 1729–1911)
- Wenlan Dong (文蘭峒(ㄨㄣˊ ㄌㄢˊ ㄉㄨㄥˋ)) (?–AD 1730) – Ruled by the House of Wei (韋)
- Kingdom of Middag (大肚王國(ㄉㄚˋ ㄉㄨˋ ㄨㄤˊ ㄍㄨㄛˊ)) (?–AD 1732) – Ruled by the House of Camachat (甘仔轄) of Papora descent
- Chiefdom of Youyang (酉陽土司(ㄧㄡˇ ㄧㄤˊ ㄊㄨˇ ㄙ)) (?–AD 1734) – Ruled by the House of Ran (冉)
- Chiefdom of Shinan (施南土司(ㄕ ㄋㄢˊ ㄊㄨˇ ㄙ)) (?–AD 1734) – Ruled by the House of Tan (覃) of Tujia descent
- Chiefdom of Mengnongzhai (猛弄寨土司(ㄇㄥˇ ㄋㄨㄥˋ ㄓㄞˋ ㄊㄨˇ ㄙ)) (AD 1735–?) – Ruled by the House of Bai (白) of Hani descent
- Chiefdom of Yanwang (岩旺土司(ㄧㄢˊ ㄨㄤˋ ㄊㄨˇ ㄙ)) (AD 1738–?) – Ruled by the House of Li (李)
- Chiefdom of Kokang (果敢土司(ㄍㄨㄛˇ ㄍㄢˇ ㄊㄨˇ ㄙ)) (AD 1739–1959) – Ruled by the House of Yang (楊) of Kokang descent
- Chiefdom of Lancangjiang (瀾滄江土司(ㄌㄢˊ ㄘㄤ ㄐㄧㄤ ㄊㄨˇ ㄙ)) (AD 1742–?) – Ruled by the House of Zhao (趙)
- Chiefdom of Middle Zhandui (中瞻對土司(ㄕㄤˋ ㄓㄢ ㄉㄨㄟˋ ㄊㄨˇ ㄙ)) (AD 1745–?)
- Chiefdom of Guihualilaowo (歸化里老窩土司(ㄍㄨㄟ ㄏㄨㄚˋ ㄌㄧˇ ㄌㄠˇ ㄨㄛ ㄊㄨˇ ㄙ)) (AD 1747–?) – Ruled by the House of Duan (段) of Bai descent
- Chiefdom of Liuku (六庫土司(ㄌㄧㄡˋ ㄎㄨˋ ㄊㄨˇ ㄙ)) (AD 1747–?) – Ruled by the House of Duan (段) of Bai descent
- Chiefdom of Citongbazhai (茨桶壩寨土司(ㄘˊ ㄊㄨㄥˇ ㄅㄚˋ ㄓㄞˋ ㄊㄨˇ ㄙ)) (AD 1753–?) – Ruled by the House of Li (李) of Hani descent
- Chiefdom of Malongzhai (馬龍寨土司(ㄇㄚˇ ㄌㄨㄥˊ ㄓㄞˋ ㄊㄨˇ ㄙ)) (AD 1755–?) – Ruled by the House of Tao (陶), the House of Bai (白), and the House of Li (李)
- Dörbet tribe of Choros (綽羅斯氏杜爾伯特部(ㄔㄨㄛˋ ㄌㄨㄛˊ ㄙ ㄕˋ ㄉㄨˋ ㄦˇ ㄅㄛˊ ㄊㄜˋ ㄅㄨˋ)) (AD 1756–1923) – Ruled by the House of Choros (綽羅斯) of Mongol descent
- Batur Khanate (巴圖爾汗國(ㄅㄚ ㄊㄨˊ ㄦˇ ㄏㄢˊ ㄍㄨㄛˊ)) (AD 1757–1759)
- Heqing Prefecture Tutongpan (鶴慶州土通判(ㄏㄜˋ ㄑㄧㄥˋ ㄓㄡ ㄊㄨˇ ㄊㄨㄥ ㄆㄢˋ)) (AD 1770–?) – Ruled by the House of Gao (高) of Bai descent
- Chiefdom of Mengjiaodong (勐角董土司(ㄇㄥˇ ㄐㄧㄠˇ ㄉㄨㄥˇ ㄊㄨˇ ㄙ)) (AD 1771–1949) – Ruled by the House of Han (罕) of Tai Nuea descent
- Old Torghut tribe (舊土爾扈特部(ㄐㄧㄡˋ ㄊㄨˇ ㄦˇ ㄏㄨˋ ㄊㄜˋ ㄅㄨˋ)) (AD 1771–1949)
- Chiefdom of Gaowuka (稿吾卡土司(ㄍㄠˇ ㄨˊ ㄎㄚˇ ㄊㄨˇ ㄙ)) (AD 1785–?) – Ruled by the House of Long (龍) of Hani descent
- Chiefdom of Adunzi (阿墩子土司(ㄚ ㄉㄨㄣ ㄗˇ ㄊㄨˇ ㄙ)) (AD 1802–?) – Ruled by the House of He (禾) of Tibetan descent
- Kavalan (蛤仔蘭三十六社(ㄏㄚˊ ㄗㄞˇ ㄌㄢˊ ㄙㄢ ㄕˊ ㄌㄧㄡˋ ㄕㄜˋ)) (?–AD 1812)
- Chiefdom of Yutong (魚通土司(ㄩˊ ㄊㄨㄥ ㄊㄨˇ ㄙ)) (AD 1833–1951) – Ruled by the House of Jia (甲) of Gyalrong descent

==== Century of Humiliation ====
- Taiping Heavenly Kingdom (太平天國(ㄊㄞˋ ㄆㄧㄥˊ ㄊㄧㄢ ㄍㄨㄛˊ)) (AD 1851–1864) – Ruled by the House of Hong (洪) of Han descent
- Chiefdom of Nixi (泥溪土司(ㄋㄧˊ ㄒㄧ ㄊㄨˇ ㄙ)) (?–AD 1853) – Ruled by the House of Wang (王)
- Cheng (成(ㄔㄥˊ)) (AD 1855–1864) – Ruled by the House of Chen (陳) of Han descent
- Pingnan (平南(ㄆㄧㄥˊ ㄋㄢˊ)) (AD 1856–1873) – Ruled by the House of Du (杜) of Hui descent
- Yanling (延陵(ㄧㄢˊ ㄌㄧㄥˊ)) (AD 1861–1868) – Ruled by the House of Wu (吳) of Zhuang descent
- Ili Sultanate (伊犁蘇丹國(ㄧ ㄌㄧˊ ㄙㄨ ㄉㄢ ㄍㄨㄛˊ)) (AD 1864–1871)
- Yettishar Khanate (哲德沙爾汗國(ㄓㄜˊ ㄉㄜˊ ㄕㄚ ㄦˇ ㄏㄢˊ ㄍㄨㄛˊ)) (AD 1865–1867)
  - Hongfu Khanate (洪福汗國(ㄏㄨㄥˊ ㄈㄨˊ ㄏㄢˊ ㄍㄨㄛˊ)) (AD 1867–1877)
- Chiefdom of Muchuan (沐川土司(ㄇㄨˋ ㄔㄨㄢ ㄊㄨˇ ㄙ)) (?–AD 1868) – Ruled by the House of Yue (悅)
- Chiefdom of Nama (那馬土司(ㄋㄚˋ ㄇㄚˇ ㄊㄨˇ ㄙ)) (?–AD 1870) – Ruled by the House of Huang (黃)
- Chiefdom of Mengbin (猛濱土司(ㄇㄥˇ ㄅㄧㄣ ㄊㄨˇ ㄙ)) (AD 1891–?) – Ruled by the House of Han (罕) of Dai descent
- Chiefdom of Jiufang (酒房土司(ㄐㄧㄡˇ ㄈㄤˊ ㄊㄨˇ ㄙ)) (AD 1891–?) – Ruled by the House of Yang (楊)
- Chiefdom of Banzhong (班中土司(ㄅㄢ ㄓㄨㄥ ㄊㄨˇ ㄙ)) (AD 1891–?) – Ruled by the House of Yang (楊)
- Chiefdom of Jianguan (間官土司(ㄐㄧㄢ ㄍㄨㄢ ㄊㄨˇ ㄙ)) (AD 1891–?) – Ruled by the House of Shi (石) of Lahu descent
- Chiefdom of Manhai (蠻海土司(ㄇㄢˊ ㄏㄞˇ ㄊㄨˇ ㄙ)) (AD 1891–?) – Ruled by the House of Shi (石) of Lahu descent
- Chiefdom of Upper Mengyun (上猛允土司(ㄕㄤˋ ㄇㄥˇ ㄩㄣˇ ㄊㄨˇ ㄙ)) (AD 1891–?) – Ruled by the House of Dao (刀) of Dai descent
- Chiefdom of Lower Mengyun (下猛允土司(ㄒㄧㄚˋ ㄇㄥˇ ㄩㄣˇ ㄊㄨˇ ㄙ)) (AD 1891–?) – Ruled by the House of Dao (刀) of Dai descent
- Chiefdom of Munai (募乃土司(ㄇㄨˋ ㄋㄞˇ ㄊㄨˇ ㄙ)) (AD 1891–?) – Ruled by the House of Shi (石) of Lahu descent
- Chiefdom of Donghe (東河土司(ㄉㄨㄥ ㄏㄜˊ ㄊㄨˇ ㄙ)) (AD 1891–?) – Ruled by the House of Zhang (張)
- Chiefdom of Ximingzhao (西明照土司(ㄒㄧ ㄇㄧㄥˊ ㄓㄠˋ ㄊㄨˇ ㄙ)) (AD 1891–?) – Ruled by the House of Li (李) of Lahu descent
- Pimaba (卑馬巴(ㄅㄟ ㄇㄚˇ ㄅㄚ)) (?–AD 1897)
- Chiefdom of Mengban (勐板土司(ㄇㄥˇ ㄅㄢˇ ㄊㄨˇ ㄙ)) (AD 1899–1955) – Ruled by the House of Jiang (蔣) of Han descent
- Llyung Topa (拉流斗霸(ㄌㄚ ㄌㄧㄡˊ ㄉㄡˇ ㄅㄚˋ)) (?–AD 1907)
- Bogd Khanate (博克多汗國(ㄅㄛˊ ㄎㄜˋ ㄉㄨㄛ ㄏㄢˊ ㄍㄨㄛˊ)) (AD 1911–1919, AD 1921–1924)
- Chiefdom of Geshizha (革什札土司(ㄍㄜˊ ㄕˊ ㄓㄚˊ ㄊㄨˇ ㄙ)) (?–AD 1911)
- Guohua Aboriginal Prefecture (果化土州(ㄍㄨㄛˇ ㄏㄨㄚˋ ㄊㄨˇ ㄓㄡ)) (?–AD 1915) – Ruled by the House of Zhao (趙)
- Empire of China (中華帝國(ㄓㄨㄥ ㄏㄨㄚˊ ㄉㄧˋ ㄍㄨㄛˊ)) (AD 1915–1916) – Ruled by the House of Yuan (袁) of Han descent
- Siling Aboriginal Prefecture (思陵土州(ㄙ ㄌㄧㄥˊ ㄊㄨˇ ㄓㄡ)) (?–AD 1916)
- Longying Aboriginal Prefecture (龍英土州(ㄌㄨㄥˊ ㄧㄥ ㄊㄨˇ ㄓㄡ)) (?–AD 1916)
- Jilun Aboriginal Prefecture (佶倫土州(ㄐㄧˊ ㄌㄨㄣˊ ㄊㄨˇ ㄓㄡ)) (?–AD 1916) – Ruled by the House of Feng (馮)
- Kingdom of Powo (波密土王(ㄅㄛ ㄇㄧˋ ㄊㄨˇ ㄨㄤˊ)) (?–AD 1910, AD 1911–1928)
- Chiefdom of Lu (魯土司(ㄌㄨˇ ㄊㄨˇ ㄙ)) (?–AD 1931) – Ruled by the House of Lu (魯) of Mongol descent
- Islamic Kingdom of Khotan (和闐伊斯蘭王國(ㄏㄜˊ ㄊㄧㄢˊ ㄧ ㄙ ㄌㄢˊ ㄨㄤˊ ㄍㄨㄛˊ)) (AD 1934)
- Manchukuo (滿洲國(ㄇㄢˇ ㄓㄡ ㄍㄨㄛˊ)) (AD 1934–1945) – Ruled by the House of Aisin Gioro (愛新覺羅) of Manchu descent
- Chiefdom of Ganya (干崖土司(ㄍㄢ ㄧㄚˊ ㄊㄨˇ ㄙ)) (?–AD 1949) – Ruled by the House of Chi (郗) of Dai descent
- Chiefdom of Wandian (灣甸土司(ㄨㄢ ㄉㄧㄢˋ ㄊㄨˇ ㄙ)) (?–AD 1949) – Ruled by the House of Dao (刀) of Dai descent and the House of Jing (景) of Dai descent
- Chiefdom of Menghai (勐海土司(ㄇㄥˇ ㄏㄞˇ ㄊㄨˇ ㄙ)) (?–AD 1950) – Ruled by the House of Shao (召) of Dai descent

==== Unclassified ====
- Forty Chiefdoms of Yushu and Neighboring Regions (玉樹等四十族(ㄩˋ ㄕㄨˋ ㄉㄥˇ ㄙˋ ㄕˊ ㄗㄨˊ)) (?–?)
  - Four Chiefdoms of Yushu (玉樹四族(ㄩˋ ㄕㄨˋ ㄙˋ ㄗㄨˊ)) (?–?)
    - Chiefdom of Jiangsai (將賽土司(ㄐㄧㄤ ㄙㄞˋ ㄊㄨˇ ㄙ)) (?–?)
    - Chiefdom of Zongju (總舉土司(ㄗㄨㄥˇ ㄐㄩˇ ㄊㄨˇ ㄙ)) (?–?)
    - Chiefdom of Yala (鴉拉土司(ㄧㄚ ㄌㄚ ㄊㄨˇ ㄙ)) (?–?)
    - Chiefdom of Rongmo (戎模土司(ㄖㄨㄥˊ ㄇㄛˊ ㄊㄨˇ ㄙ)) (?–?)
  - Chiefdom of Upper Alakeshuo (上阿拉克碩土司(ㄕㄤˋ ㄚ ㄌㄚ ㄎㄜˋ ㄕㄨㄛˋ ㄊㄨˇ ㄙ)) (?–?)
  - Chiefdom of Lower Alakeshuo (下阿拉克碩土司(ㄒㄧㄚˋ ㄚ ㄌㄚ ㄎㄜˋ ㄕㄨㄛˋ ㄊㄨˇ ㄙ)) (?–?)
  - Chiefdom of Béri (白利土司(ㄅㄞˊ ㄌㄧˋ ㄊㄨˇ ㄙ)) (?–?)
  - Chiefdom of Asake (阿薩克土司(ㄚ ㄙㄚˋ ㄎㄜˋ ㄊㄨˇ ㄙ)) (?–?)
  - Chiefdom of Ayong (阿永土司(ㄚ ㄩㄥˇ ㄊㄨˇ ㄙ)) (?–?)
  - Chiefdom of Niyamucuo (尼牙木錯土司(ㄋㄧˊ ㄧㄚˊ ㄇㄨˋ ㄘㄨㄛˋ ㄊㄨˇ ㄙ)) (?–?)
  - Chiefdom of Gucha (固察土司(ㄍㄨˋ ㄔㄚˊ ㄊㄨˇ ㄙ)) (?–?)
  - Chiefdom of Labu (拉布土司(ㄌㄚ ㄅㄨˋ ㄊㄨˇ ㄙ)) (?–?)
  - Three Chiefdoms of Zhawu (扎武三族(ㄓㄚ ㄨˇ ㄙㄢ ㄗㄨˊ)) (?–?)
    - Chiefdom of Zhawu (扎武土司(ㄓㄚ ㄨˇ ㄊㄨˇ ㄙ)) (?–?)
    - Chiefdom of Lada (拉達土司(ㄌㄚ ㄉㄚˊ ㄊㄨˇ ㄙ)) (?–?)
    - Chiefdom of Buqing (布慶土司(ㄅㄨˋ ㄑㄧㄥˋ ㄊㄨˇ ㄙ)) (?–?)
  - Chiefdom of Longbu (隆布土司(ㄌㄨㄥˊ ㄅㄨˋ ㄊㄨˇ ㄙ)) (?–?)
  - Chiefdom of Chuilengduo'erduo (吹冷多爾多土司(ㄔㄨㄟ ㄌㄥˇ ㄉㄨㄛ ㄦˇ ㄉㄨㄛ ㄊㄨˇ ㄙ)) (?–?)
  - Chiefdom of Upper Ge'erji (上格爾吉土司(ㄕㄤˋ ㄍㄜˊ ㄦˇ ㄐㄧˊ ㄊㄨˇ ㄙ)) (?–?)
  - Chiefdom of Middle Ge'erji (中格爾吉土司(ㄕㄤˋ ㄍㄜˊ ㄦˇ ㄐㄧˊ ㄊㄨˇ ㄙ)) (?–?)
  - Chiefdom of Lower Ge'erji (下格爾吉土司(ㄒㄧㄚˋ ㄍㄜˊ ㄦˇ ㄐㄧˊ ㄊㄨˇ ㄙ)) (?–?)
  - Chiefdom of Ha'ershou (哈爾受土司(ㄏㄚ ㄦˇ ㄕㄡˋ ㄊㄨˇ ㄙ)) (?–?)
  - Chiefdom of Upper Longba (上隆壩土司(ㄕㄤˋ ㄌㄨㄥˊ ㄅㄚˋ ㄊㄨˇ ㄙ)) (?–?)
  - Chiefdom of Lower Longba (下隆壩土司(ㄒㄧㄚˋ ㄌㄨㄥˊ ㄅㄚˋ ㄊㄨˇ ㄙ)) (?–?)
  - Chiefdom of Longdong (隆東土司(ㄌㄨㄥˊ ㄉㄨㄥ ㄊㄨˇ ㄙ)) (?–?)
  - Chiefdom of Chuohuo'er (綽火爾土司(ㄔㄨㄛˋ ㄏㄨㄛˇ ㄦˇ ㄊㄨˇ ㄙ)) (?–?)
  - Chiefdom of Juebala (覺巴拉土司(ㄐㄩㄝˇ ㄅㄚ ㄌㄚ ㄊㄨˇ ㄙ)) (?–?)
  - Chiefdom of Su'ermang (蘇爾莽土司(ㄙㄨ ㄦˇ ㄇㄤˇ ㄊㄨˇ ㄙ)) (?–?)
  - Chiefdom of Ye'erji (葉爾吉土司(ㄧㄝˋ ㄦˇ ㄐㄧˊ ㄊㄨˇ ㄙ)) (?–?)
  - Chiefdom of Liewang (列旺土司(ㄌㄧㄝˋ ㄨㄤˋ ㄊㄨˇ ㄙ)) (?–?)
  - Chiefdom of Antu (安圖土司(ㄢ ㄊㄨˊ ㄊㄨˇ ㄙ)) (?–?)
  - Chiefdom of Xingba (興巴土司(ㄒㄧㄥ ㄅㄚ ㄊㄨˇ ㄙ)) (?–?)
  - Chiefdom of La'erji (拉爾吉土司(ㄌㄚ ㄦˇ ㄐㄧˊ ㄊㄨˇ ㄙ)) (?–?)
  - Chiefdom of Sangse'er (桑色爾土司(ㄙㄤ ㄙㄜˋ ㄦˇ ㄊㄨˇ ㄙ)) (?–?)
  - Chiefdom of Bayannangqian (巴顏囊謙土司(ㄅㄚ ㄧㄢˊ ㄋㄤˊ ㄑㄧㄢ ㄊㄨˇ ㄙ)) (?–?)
  - Chiefdom of Dongba (洞巴土司(ㄉㄨㄥˋ ㄅㄚ ㄊㄨˇ ㄙ)) (?–?)
  - Chiefdom of Suluke (蘇魯克土司(ㄙㄨ ㄌㄨˇ ㄎㄜˋ ㄊㄨˇ ㄙ)) (?–?)
  - Chiefdom of Chindu (稱多土司(ㄔㄣˋ ㄉㄨㄛ ㄊㄨˇ ㄙ)) (?–?)
  - Chiefdom of Menggu'erjin (蒙古爾津土司(ㄇㄥˇ ㄍㄨˇ ㄦˇ ㄐㄧㄣ ㄊㄨˇ ㄙ)) (?–?)
  - Chiefdom of Yonghepu (永河普土司(ㄩㄥˇ ㄏㄜˊ ㄆㄨˇ ㄊㄨˇ ㄙ)) (?–?)
  - Chiefdom of Alike (阿里克土司(ㄚ ㄌㄧˇ ㄎㄜˋ ㄊㄨˇ ㄙ)) (?–?)
  - Chiefdom of Banshi (班石土司(ㄅㄢ ㄕˊ ㄊㄨˇ ㄙ)) (?–?)
- Thirty-nine Chiefdoms of Hor (霍爾三十九族(ㄏㄨㄛˋ ㄦˇ ㄙㄢ ㄕˊ ㄐㄧㄡˇ ㄗㄨˊ)) (?–?)
  - Chiefdom of Qiongbugalu (瓊布噶魯土司(ㄑㄩㄥˊ ㄅㄨˋ ㄍㄚˊ ㄌㄨˇ ㄊㄨˇ ㄙ)) (?–?)
  - Chiefdom of Qiongbuba'ercha (瓊布巴爾查土司(ㄑㄩㄥˊ ㄅㄨˋ ㄅㄚ ㄦˇ ㄔㄚˊ ㄊㄨˇ ㄙ)) (?–?)
  - Chiefdom of Qiongbunakelu (瓊布納克魯土司(ㄑㄩㄥˊ ㄅㄨˋ ㄋㄚˋ ㄎㄜˋ ㄌㄨˇ ㄊㄨˇ ㄙ)) (?–?)
  - Chiefdom of Lenahuo'er (勒納夥爾土司(ㄌㄜˋ ㄋㄚˋ ㄏㄨㄛˇ ㄦˇ ㄊㄨˇ ㄙ)) (?–?)
  - Chiefdom of Seliqiongzhanicha'er (色里瓊扎尼查爾土司(ㄙㄜˋ ㄌㄧˇ ㄑㄩㄥˊ ㄓㄚ ㄋㄧˊ ㄔㄚˊ ㄦˇ ㄊㄨˇ ㄙ)) (?–?)
  - Chiefdom of Seliqiongzhacanmabuma (色里瓊扎參嘛布瑪土司(ㄙㄜˋ ㄌㄧˇ ㄑㄩㄥˊ ㄓㄚ ㄘㄢ ㄇㄚˊ ㄅㄨˋ ㄇㄚˇ ㄊㄨˇ ㄙ)) (?–?)
  - Chiefdom of Seliqiongzhamalu (色里瓊扎嘛嚕土司(ㄙㄜˋ ㄌㄧˇ ㄑㄩㄥˊ ㄓㄚ ㄇㄚˊ ㄌㄨˇ ㄊㄨˇ ㄙ)) (?–?)
  - Chiefdom of Muzhuteyangba (木朱特羊巴土司(ㄇㄨˋ ㄓㄨ ㄊㄜˋ ㄧㄤˊ ㄅㄚ ㄊㄨˇ ㄙ)) (?–?)
  - Chiefdom of Bumiteledake (布米特勒達克土司(ㄅㄨˋ ㄇㄧˇ ㄊㄜˋ ㄌㄜˋ ㄉㄚˊ ㄎㄜˋ ㄊㄨˇ ㄙ)) (?–?)
  - Chiefdom of Muzhuteniyamucha (木朱特尼牙木查土司(ㄇㄨˋ ㄓㄨ ㄊㄜˋ ㄋㄧˊ ㄧㄚˊ ㄇㄨˋ ㄔㄚˊ ㄊㄨˇ ㄙ)) (?–?)
  - Chiefdom of Muzhutelisongmaba (木朱特利松嘛吧土司(ㄇㄨˋ ㄓㄨ ㄊㄜˋ ㄌㄧˋ ㄙㄨㄥ ㄇㄚˊ ㄅㄚ ㄊㄨˇ ㄙ)) (?–?)
  - Chiefdom of Muzhuteduomaba (木朱特多嘛巴土司(ㄇㄨˋ ㄓㄨ ㄊㄜˋ ㄉㄨㄛ ㄇㄚˊ ㄅㄚ ㄊㄨˇ ㄙ)) (?–?)
  - Chiefdom of Leyuanhuo'er (勒遠夥爾土司(ㄌㄜˋ ㄩㄢˇ ㄏㄨㄛˇ ㄦˇ ㄊㄨˇ ㄙ)) (?–?)
  - Chiefdom of Yironghuo'eryitama (依戎夥爾移他瑪土司(ㄧ ㄖㄨㄥˊ ㄏㄨㄛˇ ㄦˇ ㄧˊ ㄊㄚ ㄇㄚˇ ㄊㄨˇ ㄙ)) (?–?)
  - Chiefdom of Chachuhe'ersuntima'er (查楚和爾孫提瑪爾土司(ㄔㄚˊ ㄔㄨˇ ㄏㄜˊ ㄦˇ ㄙㄨㄣ ㄊㄧˊ ㄇㄚˇ ㄦˇ ㄊㄨˇ ㄙ)) (?–?)
  - Chiefdom of Ba'erdashanmuduochuanmusang (巴爾達山木多川目桑土司(ㄅㄚ ㄦˇ ㄉㄚˊ ㄕㄢ ㄇㄨˋ ㄉㄨㄛ ㄔㄨㄢ ㄇㄨˋ ㄙㄤ ㄊㄨˇ ㄙ)) (?–?)
  - Chiefdom of Malabushimanong (嘛拉布什嘛弄土司(ㄇㄚˊ ㄌㄚ ㄅㄨˋ ㄕˊ ㄇㄚˊ ㄋㄨㄥˋ ㄊㄨˇ ㄙ)) (?–?)
  - Chiefdom of Wozhutezhiduo (窩柱特只多土司(ㄨㄛ ㄓㄨˋ ㄊㄜˋ ㄓ ㄉㄨㄛ ㄊㄨˇ ㄙ)) (?–?)
  - Chiefdom of Wozhutewala (窩柱特娃拉土司(ㄨㄛ ㄓㄨˋ ㄊㄜˋ ㄨㄚˊ ㄌㄚ ㄊㄨˇ ㄙ)) (?–?)
  - Chiefdom of Pengchukehuo'er (彭楚克夥爾土司(ㄆㄥˊ ㄔㄨˇ ㄎㄜˋ ㄏㄨㄛˇ ㄦˇ ㄊㄨˇ ㄙ)) (?–?)
  - Chiefdom of Pengchukepengtama'er (彭楚克彭他瑪爾土司(ㄆㄥˊ ㄔㄨˇ ㄎㄜˋ ㄆㄥˊ ㄊㄚ ㄇㄚˇ ㄦˇ ㄊㄨˇ ㄙ)) (?–?)
  - Chiefdom of Pengchukelazhai (彭楚克拉寨土司(ㄆㄥˊ ㄔㄨˇ ㄎㄜˋ ㄌㄚ ㄓㄞˋ ㄊㄨˇ ㄙ)) (?–?)
  - Chiefdom of Pensuonakeshudageluke (盆索納克書達格魯克土司(ㄆㄣˊ ㄙㄨㄛˇ ㄋㄚˋ ㄎㄜˋ ㄕㄨ ㄉㄚˊ ㄍㄜˊ ㄌㄨˇ ㄎㄜˋ ㄊㄨˇ ㄙ)) (?–?)
  - Chiefdom of Qintiyagangnakeshubilu (沁體牙岡納克書畢魯土司(ㄑㄧㄣˋ ㄊㄧˇ ㄧㄚˊ ㄍㄤ ㄋㄚˋ ㄎㄜˋ ㄕㄨ ㄅㄧˋ ㄌㄨˇ ㄊㄨˇ ㄙ)) (?–?)
  - Chiefdom of Penshaniyagunakeluse'ercha (盆沙尼牙固納克書色爾查土司(ㄆㄣˊ ㄕㄚ ㄋㄧˊ ㄧㄚˊ ㄍㄨˋ ㄋㄚˋ ㄎㄜˋ ㄕㄨ ㄙㄜˋ ㄦˇ ㄔㄚˊ ㄊㄨˇ ㄙ)) (?–?)
  - Chiefdom of Ba'erdamunakexibenpen (巴爾達穆納克喜奔盆土司(ㄅㄚ ㄦˇ ㄉㄚˊ ㄇㄨˋ ㄋㄚˋ ㄎㄜˋ ㄒㄧˇ ㄅㄣ ㄆㄣˊ ㄊㄨˇ ㄙ)) (?–?)
  - Chiefdom of Nageshalakeshulakeshi (納格沙拉克書拉克什土司(ㄋㄚˋ ㄍㄜˊ ㄕㄚ ㄌㄚ ㄎㄜˋ ㄕㄨ ㄌㄚ ㄎㄜˋ ㄕˊ ㄊㄨˇ ㄙ)) (?–?)
  - Chiefdom of Luokenakeshugongba (洛克納克書貢巴土司(ㄌㄨㄛˋ ㄎㄜˋ ㄋㄚˋ ㄎㄜˋ ㄕㄨ ㄍㄨㄥˋ ㄅㄚ ㄊㄨˇ ㄙ)) (?–?)
  - Chiefdom of Sanzha (三渣土司(ㄙㄢ ㄓㄚ ㄊㄨˇ ㄙ)) (?–?)
  - Chiefdom of Sannalaba (三納拉巴土司(ㄙㄢ ㄋㄚˋ ㄌㄚ ㄅㄚ ㄊㄨˇ ㄙ)) (?–?)
  - Chiefdom of Pulü (撲旅土司(ㄆㄨ ㄌㄩˇ ㄊㄨˇ ㄙ)) (?–?)
  - Chiefdom of Upper Azhake (上阿扎克土司(ㄕㄤˋ ㄚ ㄓㄚ ㄎㄜˋ ㄊㄨˇ ㄙ)) (?–?)
  - Chiefdom of Lower Azhake (下阿扎克土司(ㄒㄧㄚˋ ㄚ ㄓㄚ ㄎㄜˋ ㄊㄨˇ ㄙ)) (?–?)
  - Chiefdom of Bailiezhama'er (白獵扎嘛爾土司(ㄅㄞˊ ㄌㄧㄝˋ ㄓㄚ ㄇㄚˊ ㄦˇ ㄊㄨˇ ㄙ)) (?–?)
  - Chiefdom of Upper Ganggalu (上岡噶魯土司(ㄕㄤˋ ㄍㄤ ㄍㄚˊ ㄌㄨˇ ㄊㄨˇ ㄙ)) (?–?)
  - Chiefdom of Lower Ganggalu (下岡噶魯土司(ㄒㄧㄚˋ ㄍㄤ ㄍㄚˊ ㄌㄨˇ ㄊㄨˇ ㄙ)) (?–?)
  - Chiefdom of Upper Duo'ershu (上奪爾樹土司(ㄕㄤˋ ㄉㄨㄛˊ ㄦˇ ㄕㄨˋ ㄊㄨˇ ㄙ)) (?–?)
  - Chiefdom of Lower Duo'ershu (下奪爾樹土司(ㄒㄧㄚˋ ㄉㄨㄛˊ ㄦˇ ㄕㄨˋ ㄊㄨˇ ㄙ)) (?–?)
- Eight Chiefdoms of Huanhai (環海八族(ㄏㄨㄢˊ ㄏㄞˇ ㄅㄚ ㄗㄨˊ)) (?–?)
  - Chiefdom of Gangcha (剛察土司(ㄍㄤ ㄔㄚˊ ㄊㄨˇ ㄙ)) (?–?)
  - Chiefdom of Gongwata'erdai (公窪塔爾代土司(ㄍㄨㄥ ㄨㄚ ㄊㄚˇ ㄦˇ ㄉㄞˋ ㄊㄨˇ ㄙ)) (?–?)
  - Chiefdom of Duxiu (都秀土司(ㄉㄨ ㄒㄧㄡˋ ㄊㄨˇ ㄙ)) (?–?)
  - Chiefdom of Qianbulu (千卜錄土司(ㄑㄧㄢ ㄅㄨˇ ㄌㄨˋ ㄊㄨˇ ㄙ)) (?–?)
  - Chiefdom of Wangshidaihai (汪什代海土司(ㄨㄤ ㄕˊ ㄉㄞˋ ㄏㄞˇ ㄊㄨˇ ㄙ)) (?–?)
  - Chiefdom of Aquhu (阿曲乎土司(ㄚ ㄑㄩˇ ㄏㄨ ㄊㄨˇ ㄙ)) (?–?)
  - Chiefdom of Re'an (熱安土司(ㄖㄜˋ ㄢ ㄊㄨˇ ㄙ)) (?–?)
  - Chiefdom of A'erke (阿爾克土司(ㄚ ㄦˇ ㄎㄜˋ ㄊㄨˇ ㄙ)) (?–?)
- Chiefdom of Zhujie (竹節土司(ㄓㄨˊ ㄐㄧㄝˊ ㄊㄨˇ ㄙ)) (?–?)
- Chiefdom of Bailidengma (白力登瑪土司(ㄅㄞˊ ㄌㄧˋ ㄉㄥ ㄇㄚˇ ㄊㄨˇ ㄙ)) (?–?)
- Fu (附(ㄈㄨˋ)) (?–?)
- Hua (滑(ㄏㄨㄚˊ)) (?–?)
- Baizi (白子(ㄅㄞˊ ㄗˇ)) (?–?) – Ruled by the House of Long (龍)
  - Jianning (建寧(ㄐㄧㄢˋ ㄋㄧㄥˊ)) (?–?) – Ruled by the House of Zhang (張) of Baiman descent
- Yuzhi (禺知(ㄩˊ ㄓ)) (?–?)
- Yuezhi (月氏(ㄩㄝˋ ㄓ)) (?–?)
  - Greater Yuezhi (大月氏(ㄉㄚˋ ㄩㄝˋ ㄓ)) (?–?)
  - Lesser Yuezhi (小月氏(ㄒㄧㄠˇ ㄩㄝˋ ㄓ)) (?–?)
- Five Xihou (五翕侯(ㄨˇ ㄒㄧ ㄏㄡˊ)) (?–?)
  - Xiumi Xihou (休密翕侯(ㄒㄧㄡ ㄇㄧˋ ㄒㄧ ㄏㄡˊ)) (?–?)
    - Jiabei (伽倍(ㄐㄧㄚ ㄅㄟˋ)) (?–?)
  - Shuangmi Xihou (雙靡翕侯(ㄕㄨㄤ ㄇㄧˇ ㄒㄧ ㄏㄡˊ)) (?–?)
    - Zhexuemosun (折薛莫孫(ㄓㄜˊ ㄒㄩㄝ ㄇㄛˋ ㄙㄨㄣ)) (?–?)
  - Guishuang Xihou (貴霜翕侯(ㄍㄨㄟˋ ㄕㄨㄤ ㄒㄧ ㄏㄡˊ)) (?–?)
    - Qiandun (鉗敦(ㄑㄧㄢˊ ㄉㄨㄣ)) (?–?)
  - Xidun Xihou (肸頓翕侯(ㄒㄧ ㄉㄨㄣˋ ㄒㄧ ㄏㄡˊ)) (?–?)
    - Fudisha (弗敵沙(ㄈㄨˊ ㄉㄧˊ ㄕㄚ)) (?–?)
  - Gaofu Xihou (高附翕侯(ㄍㄠ ㄈㄨˋ ㄒㄧ ㄏㄡˊ)) (?–?)
    - Yanfuye (閻浮謁(ㄧㄢˊ ㄈㄨˊ ㄧㄝˋ)) (?–?)
- Nine Clans of Zhaowu (昭武九姓(ㄓㄠ ㄨˇ ㄐㄧㄡˇ ㄒㄧㄥˋ)) (?–?)
  - Kang (康(ㄎㄤ)) (?–?) – Ruled by the House of Zhaowu (昭武) of Sogdian descent
  - Shi (史(ㄕˇ)) (?–?) – Ruled by the House of Zhaowu (昭武) of Sogdian descent
  - An (安(ㄢ)) (?–?) – Ruled by the House of Zhaowu (昭武) of Sogdian descent
  - Cao (曹(ㄘㄠˊ)) (?–?) – Ruled by the House of Zhaowu (昭武) of Sogdian descent
    - Eastern Cao (東曹(ㄉㄨㄥ ㄘㄠˊ)) (?–?)
    - Middle Cao (中曹(ㄓㄨㄥ ㄘㄠˊ)) (?–?)
    - Western Cao (西曹(ㄒㄧ ㄘㄠˊ)) (?–?)
  - Shi (石(ㄕˊ)) (?–?) – Ruled by the House of Zhaowu (昭武) of Sogdian descent
  - Mi (米(ㄇㄧˇ)) (?–?) – Ruled by the House of Zhaowu (昭武) of Sogdian descent
  - He (何(ㄏㄜˊ)) (?–?) – Ruled by the House of Zhaowu (昭武) of Sogdian descent
  - Huoxun (火尋(ㄏㄨㄛˇ ㄒㄩㄣˊ)) (?–?) – Ruled by the House of Zhaowu (昭武) of Sogdian descent
  - Wudi (戊地(ㄨˋ ㄉㄧˋ)) (?–?) – Ruled by the House of Zhaowu (昭武) of Sogdian descent
- Mu (穆(ㄇㄨˋ)) (?–?) – Ruled by the House of Zhaowu (昭武) of Sogdian descent
- Eastern An (東安(ㄉㄨㄥ ㄢ)) (?–?) – Ruled by the House of Zhaowu (昭武) of Sogdian descent
- Bi (畢(ㄅㄧˋ)) (?–?) – Ruled by the House of Zhaowu (昭武) of Sogdian descent
- Peihan (沛捍(ㄆㄟˋ ㄏㄢˋ)) (?–?) – Ruled by the House of Zhaowu (昭武) of Sogdian descent
- Nasebo (那色波(ㄋㄚˋ ㄙㄜˋ ㄅㄛ)) (?–?) – Ruled by the House of Zhaowu (昭武) of Sogdian descent
- Wunahe (烏那曷(ㄨ ㄋㄚˋ ㄏㄜˊ)) (?–?) – Ruled by the House of Zhaowu (昭武) of Sogdian descent
- Caojuzha (漕矩吒(ㄘㄠˊ ㄐㄩˇ ㄓㄚ)) (?–?) – Ruled by the House of Zhaowu (昭武) of Sogdian descent
- Western Ou (西甌(ㄒㄧ ㄡ)) (?–?)
- Zhujubo (朱俱波(ㄓㄨ ㄐㄩˋ ㄅㄛ)) (?–?)
- Yizhi (移支(ㄧˊ ㄓ)) (?–?)
- Deruo (德若(ㄉㄜˊ ㄖㄨㄛˋ)) (?–?)
- Wuhuan (烏桓(ㄨ ㄏㄨㄢˊ)) (?–?)
  - Wuwan (烏丸(ㄨ ㄨㄢˊ)) (?–?)
- Quyi (屈射(ㄑㄩ ㄧˋ)) (?–?)
- Hunyu (渾窳(ㄏㄨㄣˊ ㄩˇ)) (?–?)
- Xinli (薪犂(ㄒㄧㄣ ㄌㄧˊ)) (?–?)
- Julan (且蘭(ㄐㄩ ㄌㄢˊ)) (?–?)
- Xi (霫(ㄒㄧˊ)) (?–?)
- Kunmingyi (昆明夷(ㄎㄨㄣ ㄇㄧㄥˊ ㄧˊ)) (?–?)
- Zuodu (筰都(ㄗㄨㄛˊ ㄉㄨ)) (?–?)
- Ranmang (冉駹(ㄖㄢˇ ㄇㄤˊ)) (?–?)
- Baima (白馬(ㄅㄞˊ ㄇㄚˇ)) (?–?)
- Dongcan (棟蠶(ㄉㄨㄥˋ ㄘㄢˊ)) (?–?)
- Xi (徙(ㄒㄧˇ)) (?–?)
- Damou (大牟(ㄉㄚˋ ㄇㄡˊ)) (?–?)
- Linhu (林胡(ㄌㄧㄣˊ ㄏㄨˊ)) (?–?)
- Qihu (契胡(ㄑㄧˋ ㄏㄨˊ)) (?–?) – Ruled by the House of Erzhu (爾朱)
- Tuhe (屠何(ㄊㄨˊ ㄏㄜˊ)) (?–?)
- Yachou (亞醜(ㄧㄚˋ ㄔㄡˇ)) (?–?)
- Kuang (曠(ㄎㄨㄤˋ)) (?–?) – Ruled by the House of Kuang (曠)
- Rong of Yuwu (余無之戎(ㄩˊ ㄨˊ ㄓ ㄖㄨㄥˊ)) (?–?)
- Dianyue (滇越(ㄉㄧㄢ ㄩㄝˋ)) (?–?)
- Fulou (縛婁(ㄈㄨˋ ㄌㄡˊ)) (?–?)
- Yulishi (郁立師(ㄩˋ ㄌㄧˋ ㄕ)) (?–?)
- Danhuan (單桓(ㄉㄢ ㄏㄨㄢˊ)) (?–?)
- Wutanzili (烏貪訾離(ㄨ ㄊㄢ ㄗ ㄌㄧˊ)) (?–?)
- Xianling Qiang (先零羌(ㄒㄧㄢ ㄌㄧㄥˊ ㄑㄧㄤ)) (?–?)
- Toquz Oghuz (九姓烏古斯(ㄐㄧㄡˇ ㄒㄧㄥˋ ㄨ ㄍㄨˇ ㄙ)) (?–?) – Ruled by the House of Yaglakar (藥羅葛) of Uyghur descent
- Sushen (肅慎(ㄙㄨˋ ㄕㄣˋ)) (?–?)
- Kumo Xi (庫莫奚(ㄎㄨˋ ㄇㄛˋ ㄒㄧ)) (?–?) – Ruled by the House of Li (李) of Kumo Xi descent
- Zhongyun (仲雲(ㄓㄨㄥˋ ㄩㄣˊ)) (?–?)
- Seven Dong of Qinzhou (欽州七峒(ㄑㄧㄣ ㄓㄡ ㄑㄧ ㄉㄨㄥˋ)) (?–?)
  - Boshi Dong (博是峒(ㄅㄛˊ ㄕˋ ㄉㄨㄥˋ)) (?–?)
  - Jianshan Dong (鑒山峒(ㄐㄧㄢˋ ㄕㄢ ㄉㄨㄥˋ)) (?–?)
  - Tielang Dong (貼浪峒(ㄊㄧㄝ ㄌㄤˋ ㄉㄨㄥˋ)) (?–?)
  - Shiluo Dong (時羅峒(ㄕˊ ㄌㄨㄛˊ ㄉㄨㄥˋ)) (?–?)
  - Jian'an Dong (漸案峒(ㄐㄧㄢˋ ㄢˋ ㄉㄨㄥˋ)) (?–?)
  - Ruxi Dong (如昔峒(ㄖㄨˊ ㄒㄧ ㄉㄨㄥˋ)) (?–?)
  - Gusen Dong (古森峒(ㄍㄨˇ ㄙㄣ ㄉㄨㄥˋ)) (?–?)
- Ten States of Bili (裨離十國(ㄅㄧˋ ㄌㄧˊ ㄕˊ ㄍㄨㄛˊ)) (?–?)
  - Bili (裨離(ㄅㄧˋ ㄌㄧˊ)) (?–?)
  - Yangyun (養雲(ㄧㄤˇ ㄩㄣˊ)) (?–?)
  - Koumohan (寇莫汗(ㄎㄡˋ ㄇㄛˋ ㄏㄢˋ)) (?–?)
  - Yiqun (一群(ㄧ ㄑㄩㄣˊ)) (?–?)
  - Mounu (牟奴(ㄇㄡˊ ㄋㄨˊ)) (?–?)
  - Molu (模盧(ㄇㄛˊ ㄌㄨˊ)) (?–?)
  - Yulimoli (于離末利(ㄩˊ ㄌㄧˊ ㄇㄛˋ ㄌㄧˋ)) (?–?)
  - Pudu (蒲都(ㄆㄨˊ ㄉㄨ)) (?–?)
  - Shengquan (繩全(ㄕㄥˊ ㄑㄩㄢˊ)) (?–?)
  - Shalou (沙樓(ㄕㄚ ㄌㄡˊ)) (?–?)
- Doumolou (豆莫婁(ㄉㄡˋ ㄇㄛˋ ㄌㄡˊ)) (?–?)
- Liugui (流鬼(ㄌㄧㄡˊ ㄍㄨㄟˇ)) (?–?)
- Huaxu (華胥(ㄏㄨㄚˊ ㄒㄩ)) (?–?)
- Tuoli (橐離(ㄊㄨㄛˊ ㄌㄧˊ)) (?–?)
- Wulian (毋斂(ㄨˊ ㄌㄧㄢˇ)) (?–?)
- Congling Uyghur Kingdom (蔥嶺回鶻(ㄘㄨㄥ ㄌㄧㄥˇ ㄏㄨㄟˊ ㄏㄨˊ)) (?–?)
- Sabetiq (射不力(ㄕㄜˋ ㄅㄨˋ ㄌㄧˋ)) (?–?)
- Lalekelek (力里(ㄌㄧˋ ㄌㄧˇ)) (?–?)
- Kuvalen (姑仔崙(ㄍㄨ ㄗㄞˇ ㄌㄨㄣˊ)) (?–?) – Ruled by the House of Vaviluuan (發飛乎藍) of Paiwan descent
- Draki (四林格(ㄙˋ ㄌㄧㄣˊ ㄍㄜˊ)) (?–?)
- Auran (後壠(ㄏㄡˋ ㄌㄨㄥˇ)) (?–?)
- Kulon (龜崙(ㄍㄨㄟ ㄌㄨㄣˊ)) (?–?)
- Favorlang (虎尾壟(ㄏㄨˇ ㄨㄟˇ ㄌㄨㄥˇ)) (?–?)
- Tiksam (竹塹(ㄓㄨˊ ㄑㄧㄢˋ)) (?–?)
- Kibuwan (加祿堂(ㄐㄧㄚ ㄌㄨˋ ㄊㄤˊ)) (?–?)
- Tamsui (淡水(ㄉㄢˋ ㄕㄨㄟˇ)) (?–?)
- Jilong (雞籠(ㄐㄧ ㄌㄨㄥˊ)) (?–?)
- Liuqiu (流求(ㄌㄧㄡˊ ㄑㄧㄡˊ)) (?–?) – Ruled by the House of Huansi (歡斯)
- Hujie (呼揭(ㄏㄨ ㄐㄧㄝ)) (?–?)
- Jiankun (堅昆(ㄐㄧㄢ ㄎㄨㄣ)) (?–?)
- Luodian (羅殿(ㄌㄨㄛˊ ㄉㄧㄢˋ)) (?–?)
- Sumpa (蘇毗(ㄙㄨ ㄆㄧˊ)) (?–?)
- Kingdom of Almalik (阿力麻里王国(ㄚ ㄌㄧˋ ㄇㄚˊ ㄌㄧˇ ㄨㄤˊ ㄍㄨㄛˊ)) (?–?)
- Tribes of Three Kings (三王部落(ㄙㄢ ㄨㄤˊ ㄅㄨˋ ㄌㄨㄛˋ)) (?–?) – Ruled by the House of Baima (白馬)
  - Yang-shi (楊氏(ㄧㄤˊ ㄕˋ)) (?–?) – Ruled by the House of Yang (楊)
  - Liu-shi (劉氏(ㄌㄧㄡˊ ㄕˋ)) (?–?) – Ruled by the House of Liu (劉)
  - Hao-shi (郝氏(ㄏㄠˇ ㄕˋ)) (?–?) – Ruled by the House of Hao (郝)
- Merkit state (蔑兒乞(ㄇㄧㄝˋ ㄦˊ ㄑㄧˇ)) (?–?) – Ruled by the House of Uduyid (兀都亦惕) of Mongol descent
- Eastern Xieman (東謝蠻(ㄉㄨㄥ ㄒㄧㄝˋ ㄇㄢˊ)) (?–?) – Ruled by the House of Xie (謝)
- Western Xieman (西謝蠻(ㄒㄧ ㄒㄧㄝˋ ㄇㄢˊ)) (?–?) – Ruled by the House of Xie (謝)
- Southern Xieman (南謝蠻(ㄋㄢˊ ㄒㄧㄝˋ ㄇㄢˊ)) (?–?) – Ruled by the House of Xie (謝)
- Western Zhaoman (西趙蠻(ㄒㄧ ㄓㄠˋ ㄇㄢˊ)) (?–?) – Ruled by the House of Zhao (趙)
- Zangkeman (牂牁蠻(ㄗㄤ ㄎㄜ ㄇㄢˊ)) (?–?) – Ruled by the House of Xie (謝)
- Danzhouman (丹州蠻(ㄉㄢ ㄓㄡ ㄇㄢˊ)) (?–?) – Ruled by the House of Mo (莫)
- Eastern Erheman (東洱河蠻(ㄉㄨㄥ ㄦˇ ㄏㄜˊ ㄇㄢˊ)) (?–?) – Ruled by the House of Yang (楊)
- Western Erheman (西洱河蠻(ㄒㄧ ㄦˇ ㄏㄜˊ ㄇㄢˊ)) (?–?) – Ruled by the House of Yang (楊)
- Songwaiman (松外蠻(ㄙㄨㄥ ㄨㄞˋ ㄇㄢˊ)) (?–?) – Ruled by the House of Meng (蒙)
- Heman (和蠻(ㄏㄜˊ ㄇㄢˊ)) (?–?) – Ruled by the House of Wang (王)
- Shunman (順蠻(ㄕㄨㄣˋ ㄇㄢˊ)) (?–?) – Ruled by the House of Bang (傍)
- Yongchangman (永昌蠻(ㄩㄥˇ ㄔㄤ ㄇㄢˊ)) (?–?) – Ruled by the House of Dong (董)
- Guangyuanzhouman (廣源州蠻(ㄍㄨㄤˇ ㄩㄢˊ ㄓㄡ ㄇㄢˊ)) (?–?) – Ruled by the House of Nong (儂)
- Fushuizhouman (撫水州蠻(ㄈㄨˇ ㄕㄨㄟˇ ㄓㄡ ㄇㄢˊ)) (?–?) – Ruled by the House of Meng (蒙)
- Huanzhouman (環州蠻(ㄏㄨㄢˊ ㄓㄡ ㄇㄢˊ)) (?–?) – Ruled by the House of Ou (區)
- Nanpingliao (南平獠(ㄋㄢˊ ㄆㄧㄥˊ ㄌㄧㄠˊ)) (?–?) – Ruled by the House of Zhu (硃)
- Eight States of Xishan (西山八國(ㄒㄧ ㄕㄢ ㄅㄚ ㄍㄨㄛˊ)) (?–?)
  - Buzu (逋租(ㄅㄨ ㄗㄨ)) (?–?)
  - Gelin (哥鄰(ㄍㄜ ㄌㄧㄣˊ)) (?–?)
  - Ruoshui (弱水(ㄖㄨㄛˋ ㄕㄨㄟˇ)) (?–?)
  - Xidong (悉董(ㄒㄧ ㄉㄨㄥˇ)) (?–?)
  - Nanshui (南水(ㄋㄢˊ ㄕㄨㄟˇ)) (?–?)
  - Duoba (咄霸(ㄉㄨㄛ ㄅㄚˋ)) (?–?)
  - Qingyuan (清遠(ㄑㄧㄥ ㄩㄢˇ)) (?–?)
  - Baigou (白狗(ㄅㄞˊ ㄍㄡˇ)) (?–?)
- Zangke (牂牁(ㄗㄤ ㄎㄜ)) (?–?)
- Kunwu (昆吾(ㄎㄨㄣ ㄨˊ)) (?–?) – Ruled by the House of Ji (己) of Huaxia descent
- Luodian (羅殿(ㄌㄨㄛˊ ㄉㄧㄢˋ)) (?–?)
- Meishan Dong (梅山峒(ㄇㄟˊ ㄕㄢ ㄉㄨㄥˋ)) (?–?)
  - Meishan Dong Left Wing (梅山峒左甲(ㄇㄟˊ ㄕㄢ ㄉㄨㄥˋ ㄗㄨㄛˇ ㄐㄧㄚˇ)) (?–?) – Ruled by the House of Fu (扶)
  - Meishan Dong Right Wing (梅山峒右甲(ㄇㄟˊ ㄕㄢ ㄉㄨㄥˋ ㄧㄡˋ ㄐㄧㄚˇ)) (?–?) – Ruled by the House of Dun (頓)
- Xi Dong (溪峒(ㄒㄧ ㄉㄨㄥˋ)) (?–?) – Ruled by the House of Yang (楊)
- Yizi (夷子(ㄧˊ ㄗˇ)) (?–?) – Ruled by the House of Ji (季)
- Qiongdu (邛都(ㄑㄩㄥˊ ㄉㄨ)) (?–?)
- Xi (巂(ㄒㄧ)) (?–?)
- Azhe (阿者(ㄚ ㄓㄜˇ)) (?–?)
- Dilie (敵烈(ㄉㄧˊ ㄌㄧㄝˋ)) (?–?)
- Wugu (烏古(ㄨ ㄍㄨˇ)) (?–?)
- Suo (索(ㄙㄨㄛˇ)) (?–?)
- Xunyu (葷粥(ㄒㄩㄣ ㄩˋ)) (?–?) – Ruled by the House of Si (姒) of Huaxia descent
- Huimo (ㄏㄨㄟˋ ㄇㄛˋ({{{2}}})) (?–?)
- Dugu tribe (獨孤部(ㄉㄨˊ ㄍㄨ ㄅㄨˋ)) (?–?) – Ruled by the House of Liu (劉) of Xiongnu descent
- Murong tribe (慕容部(ㄇㄨˋ ㄖㄨㄥˊ ㄅㄨˋ)) (?–?) – Ruled by the House of Murong (慕容) of Xianbei descent
- Helan tribe (賀蘭部(ㄏㄜˋ ㄌㄢˊ ㄅㄨˋ)) (?–?) – Ruled by the House of Helan (賀蘭) of Xianbei descent
  - Boma (駁馬(ㄅㄛˊ ㄇㄚˇ)) (?–?)
- Tongluo tribe (同羅部(ㄊㄨㄥˊ ㄌㄨㄛˊ ㄅㄨˋ)) (?–?)
- Bayirqu tribe (拔野古部(ㄅㄚˊ ㄧㄝˇ ㄍㄨˇ ㄅㄨˋ)) (?–?)
- Ikires tribe (亦乞列思部(ㄧˋ ㄑㄧˇ ㄌㄧㄝˋ ㄙ ㄅㄨˋ)) (?–?)
- Dörbet tribe of Borjigin (博爾濟吉特氏杜爾伯特部(ㄅㄛˊ ㄦˇ ㄐㄧˋ ㄐㄧˊ ㄊㄜˋ ㄕˋ ㄉㄨˋ ㄦˇ ㄅㄛˊ ㄊㄜˋ ㄅㄨˋ)) (?–?) – Ruled by the House of Borjigin (孛兒只斤) of Mongol descent
- Qibi tribe (契苾部(ㄑㄧˋ ㄅㄧˋ ㄅㄨˋ)) (?–?) – Ruled by the House of Qibi (契苾) of Tiele descent
- Lordship of Ayuxi (阿芋徙君長國(ㄚ ㄩˋ ㄒㄧˇ ㄐㄩㄣ ㄓㄤˇ ㄍㄨㄛˊ)) (?–?)
- Lordship of Gukougou (古口勾君長國(ㄍㄨˇ ㄎㄡˇ ㄍㄡ ㄐㄩㄣ ㄓㄤˇ ㄍㄨㄛˊ)) (?–?)
- Lordship of Awaire (阿外惹君長國(ㄚ ㄨㄞˋ ㄖㄜˇ ㄐㄩㄣ ㄓㄤˇ ㄍㄨㄛˊ)) (?–?)
- Lordship of Bole (播勒君長國(ㄅㄛ ㄌㄜˋ ㄐㄩㄣ ㄓㄤˇ ㄍㄨㄛˊ)) (?–?)
- Lordship of Chele (扯勒君長國(ㄔㄜˇ ㄌㄜˋ ㄐㄩㄣ ㄓㄤˇ ㄍㄨㄛˊ)) (?–?)
- Lordship of Lousu (婁素君長國(ㄌㄡˊ ㄙㄨˋ ㄐㄩㄣ ㄓㄤˇ ㄍㄨㄛˊ)) (?–?)
- Lordship of Doumi (陡靡君長國(ㄉㄡˇ ㄇㄧˊ ㄐㄩㄣ ㄓㄤˇ ㄍㄨㄛˊ)) (?–?)
- Lordship of Dongchuan (東川君長國(ㄉㄨㄥ ㄔㄨㄢ ㄐㄩㄣ ㄓㄤˇ ㄍㄨㄛˊ)) (?–?)
- Tuoling Aboriginal County (陀陵土縣(ㄊㄨㄛˊ ㄌㄧㄥˊ ㄊㄨˇ ㄒㄧㄢˋ)) (?–?) – Ruled by the House of Huang (黃)
- Sicheng Aboriginal Prefecture (思城土州(ㄙ ㄔㄥˊ ㄊㄨˇ ㄓㄡ)) (?–?)
- Chuxiong County Tutongshi (楚雄縣土通事(ㄔㄨˇ ㄒㄩㄥˊ ㄒㄧㄢˋ ㄊㄨˇ ㄊㄨㄥ ㄕˋ)) (?–?) – Ruled by the House of Kou (寇)
- Chuxiong County Tutongba (楚雄縣土通把(ㄔㄨˇ ㄒㄩㄥˊ ㄒㄧㄢˋ ㄊㄨˇ ㄊㄨㄥ ㄅㄚˇ)) (?–?) – Ruled by the House of Li (李) and the House of Zhang (張)
- Chuxiong County Tubashi (楚雄縣土把事(ㄔㄨˇ ㄒㄩㄥˊ ㄒㄧㄢˋ ㄊㄨˇ ㄅㄚˇ ㄕˋ)) (?–?) – Ruled by the House of He (何), the House of Li (李), and the House of Yang (楊)
- Chuxiong County Tuxunjian (楚雄縣土巡檢(ㄔㄨˇ ㄒㄩㄥˊ ㄒㄧㄢˋ ㄊㄨˇ ㄒㄩㄣˊ ㄐㄧㄢˇ)) (?–?) – Ruled by the House of Yang (楊) of Yi descent
- Heqing Prefecture Tuqianfuzhang (鶴慶府土千夫長(ㄏㄜˋ ㄑㄧㄥˋ ㄈㄨˇ ㄊㄨˇ ㄑㄧㄢ ㄈㄨ ㄓㄤˇ)) (?–?) – Ruled by the House of Gao (高) of Bai descent
- Heqing Tujingli (鶴慶土經歷(ㄏㄜˋ ㄑㄧㄥˋ ㄊㄨˇ ㄐㄧㄥ ㄌㄧˋ)) (?–?) – Ruled by the House of Wang (王) and the House of Wei (魏)
- Xundian Tuqianfuzhang (尋甸土千夫長(ㄒㄩㄣˊ ㄉㄧㄢˋ ㄊㄨˇ ㄑㄧㄢ ㄈㄨ ㄓㄤˇ)) (?–?) – Ruled by the House of Mu (木) of Nakhi descent
- Yao'an Prefecture Tuzhaomo (姚安府土照磨(ㄧㄠˊ ㄢ ㄈㄨˇ ㄊㄨˇ ㄓㄠˋ ㄇㄛˊ)) (?–?) – Ruled by the House of Gao (高) of Bai descent
- Dingyuan County Tubashi (定遠縣土把事(ㄉㄧㄥˋ ㄩㄢˇ ㄒㄧㄢˋ ㄊㄨˇ ㄅㄚˇ ㄕˋ)) (?–?) – Ruled by the House of Wang (王)
- Shizhu Anfusi Tongzhi (石砫安撫司同知(ㄕˊ ㄓㄨˋ ㄢ ㄈㄨˇ ㄙ ㄊㄨㄥˊ ㄓ)) (?–?) – Ruled by the House of Chen (陳)
- Chiefdom of Dingbian County (定邊縣土司(ㄉㄧㄥˋ ㄅㄧㄢ ㄒㄧㄢˋ ㄊㄨˇ ㄙ)) (?–?) – Ruled by the House of Shao (邵)
- Chiefdom of Geni (革泥土司(ㄍㄜˊ ㄋㄧˊ ㄊㄨˇ ㄙ)) (?–?)
- Chiefdom of Zanli (咱里土司(ㄗㄢˊ ㄌㄧˇ ㄊㄨˇ ㄙ)) (?–?) – Ruled by the House of Gu (古)
- Chiefdom of Yuke (魚科土司(ㄩˊ ㄎㄜ ㄊㄨˇ ㄙ)) (?–?)
- Chiefdom of Zhuowo (倬倭土司(ㄓㄨㄛ ㄨㄛ ㄊㄨˇ ㄙ)) (?–?)
- Chiefdom of Suweiyi (速為驛土司(ㄙㄨˋ ㄨㄟˊ ㄧˋ ㄊㄨˇ ㄙ)) (?–?)
- Chiefdom of Youdian (右甸土司(ㄧㄡˋ ㄉㄧㄢˋ ㄊㄨˇ ㄙ)) (?–?) – Ruled by the House of Jiang (蔣) of Blang descent and the House of Duan (段) of Bai descent
- Chiefdom of Kongsa (孔撒土司(ㄎㄨㄥˇ ㄙㄚ ㄊㄨˇ ㄙ)) (?–?)
- Chiefdom of Zhuwo (侏倭土司(ㄓㄨ ㄨㄛ ㄊㄨˇ ㄙ)) (?–?)
- Chiefdom of Zhanggu (章谷土司(ㄓㄤ ㄍㄨˇ ㄊㄨˇ ㄙ)) (?–?)
- Chiefdom of Laowo (老撾土司(ㄌㄠˇ ㄨㄛ ㄊㄨˇ ㄙ)) (?–?) – Ruled by the House of Diao (刁) of Lao descent
- Chiefdom of Mubang (木邦土司(ㄇㄨˋ ㄅㄤ ㄊㄨˇ ㄙ)) (?–?)
- Chiefdom of Nalouchongdao'anzheng'erli (納樓崇道安正二里土司(ㄋㄚˋ ㄌㄡˊ ㄔㄨㄥˊ ㄉㄠˋ ㄢ ㄓㄥˋ ㄦˋ ㄌㄧˇ ㄊㄨˇ ㄙ)) (?–?) – Ruled by the House of Pu (普) of Yi descent
- Chiefdom of Liuhuzhangzhai (六呼掌寨土司(ㄌㄧㄡˋ ㄏㄨ ㄓㄤˇ ㄓㄞˋ ㄊㄨˇ ㄙ)) (?–?) – Ruled by the House of Li (李) of Hani descent
- Chiefdom of Shanghekuirong (上河虧容土司(ㄕㄤˋ ㄏㄜˊ ㄎㄨㄟ ㄖㄨㄥˊ ㄊㄨˇ ㄙ)) (?–?) – Ruled by the House of Sun (孫) of Dai descent
- Chiefdom of Canbulang (參卜郎土司(ㄘㄢ ㄅㄨˇ ㄌㄤˊ ㄊㄨˇ ㄙ)) (?–?)
- Chiefdom of Shuijijiang (水犄姜土司(ㄕㄨㄟˇ ㄐㄧ ㄐㄧㄤ ㄊㄨˇ ㄙ)) (?–?)
  - Chiefdom of Shuidejiang (水德江土司(ㄕㄨㄟˇ ㄉㄜˊ ㄐㄧㄤ ㄊㄨˇ ㄙ)) (AD 14th century–1605)
- Chiefdom of Yidu (夷都土司(ㄧˊ ㄉㄨ ㄊㄨˇ ㄙ)) (?–?) – Ruled by the House of Yi (夷)
- Chiefdom of Pingyi (平夷土司(ㄆㄧㄥˊ ㄧˊ ㄊㄨˇ ㄙ)) (?–?) – Ruled by the House of Wang (王)
- Chiefdom of Leipo (雷坡土司(ㄌㄟˊ ㄆㄛ ㄊㄨˇ ㄙ)) (?–?) – Ruled by the House of Yang (楊)
- Chiefdom of Guizhou (貴州土司(ㄍㄨㄟˋ ㄓㄡ ㄊㄨˇ ㄙ)) (?–?)
- Chiefdom of Zhengmai (整賣土司(ㄓㄥˇ ㄇㄞˋ ㄊㄨˇ ㄙ)) (?–?)
- Chiefdom of Mengliang (孟良土司(ㄇㄥˋ ㄌㄧㄤˊ ㄊㄨˇ ㄙ)) (?–?)
- Chiefdom of Menghai (猛海土司(ㄇㄥˇ ㄏㄞˇ ㄊㄨˇ ㄙ)) (?–?) – Ruled by the House of Dao (刀) of Dai descent
- Chiefdom of Mengyuan (猛元土司(ㄇㄥˇ ㄩㄢˊ ㄊㄨˇ ㄙ)) (?–?) – Ruled by the House of Dao (刀) of Dai descent
- Chiefdom of Meng'a (猛阿土司(ㄇㄥˇ ㄚ ㄊㄨˇ ㄙ)) (?–?) – Ruled by the House of Shao (召) of Dai descent
- Chiefdom of Mengla (猛臘土司(ㄇㄥˇ ㄌㄚˋ ㄊㄨˇ ㄙ)) (?–?)
- Chiefdom of Mengwang (猛往土司(ㄇㄥˇ ㄨㄤˇ ㄊㄨˇ ㄙ)) (?–?) – Ruled by the House of Shao (召) of Dai descent
- Chiefdom of Menghun (猛混土司(ㄇㄥˇ ㄏㄨㄣˋ ㄊㄨˇ ㄙ)) (?–?) – Ruled by the House of Dao (刀) of Dai descent
- Chiefdom of Mengzhe (猛遮土司(ㄇㄥˇ ㄓㄜ ㄊㄨˇ ㄙ)) (?–?)
- Chiefdom of Menglong (猛龍土司(ㄇㄥˇ ㄌㄨㄥˊ ㄊㄨˇ ㄙ)) (?–?) – Ruled by the House of Bai (白)
- Chiefdom of Mengla (猛拉土司(ㄇㄥˇ ㄌㄚ ㄊㄨˇ ㄙ)) (?–?)
- Chiefdom of Mengyong (猛勇土司(ㄇㄥˇ ㄩㄥˇ ㄊㄨˇ ㄙ)) (?–?)
- Chiefdom of Mengsan (猛散土司(ㄇㄥˇ ㄙㄢˋ ㄊㄨˇ ㄙ)) (?–?)
- Chiefdom of Mengyu (孟育土司(ㄇㄥˋ ㄩˋ ㄊㄨˇ ㄙ)) (?–?)
- Chiefdom of Mengwang (勐旺土司(ㄇㄥˇ ㄨㄤˋ ㄊㄨˇ ㄙ)) (?–?)
- Chiefdom of Tianzhou (田州土司(ㄊㄧㄢˊ ㄓㄡ ㄊㄨˇ ㄙ)) (?–?) – Ruled by the House of Cen (岑) of Zhuang descent
- Chiefdom of Weiyuan (威遠土司(ㄨㄟ ㄩㄢˇ ㄊㄨˇ ㄙ)) (?–?) – Ruled by the House of Dao (刀) of Dai descent
- Chiefdom of Yongle (永樂土司(ㄩㄥˇ ㄌㄜˋ ㄊㄨˇ ㄙ)) (?–?) – Ruled by the House of Pu (普)
- Chiefdom of Liucun (六村土司(ㄌㄧㄡˋ ㄘㄨㄣ ㄊㄨˇ ㄙ)) (?–?) – Ruled by the House of Sun (孫)
- Chiefdom of Zongwa (宗瓦土司(ㄗㄨㄥ ㄨㄚˇ ㄊㄨˇ ㄙ)) (?–?) – Ruled by the House of Pu (普)
- Chiefdom of Zongha (宗哈土司(ㄗㄨㄥ ㄏㄚ ㄊㄨˇ ㄙ)) (?–?) – Ruled by the House of Bai (白)
- Chiefdom of Ganlanba (橄欖壩土司(ㄍㄢˇ ㄌㄢˇ ㄅㄚˋ ㄊㄨˇ ㄙ)) (?–?)
- Chiefdom of Yiwu (易武土司(ㄧˋ ㄨˇ ㄊㄨˇ ㄙ)) (?–?)
- Chiefdom of Liushun (六順土司(ㄌㄧㄡˋ ㄕㄨㄣˋ ㄊㄨˇ ㄙ)) (?–?)
- Chiefdom of Buha (補哈土司(ㄅㄨˇ ㄏㄚ ㄊㄨˇ ㄙ)) (?–?)
- Chiefdom of Jinghai (景海土司(ㄐㄧㄥˇ ㄏㄞˇ ㄊㄨˇ ㄙ)) (?–?)
- Chiefdom of Jingxian (景綫土司(ㄐㄧㄥˇ ㄒㄧㄢˋ ㄊㄨˇ ㄙ)) (?–?)
- Chiefdom of Manmu (蠻暮土司(ㄇㄢˊ ㄇㄨˋ ㄊㄨˇ ㄙ)) (?–?)
- Chiefdom of Dashan (大山土司(ㄉㄚˋ ㄕㄢ ㄊㄨˇ ㄙ)) (?–?)
- Chiefdom of Puteng (普藤土司(ㄆㄨˇ ㄊㄥˊ ㄊㄨˇ ㄙ)) (?–?)
- Chiefdom of Zhengdong (整董土司(ㄓㄥˇ ㄉㄨㄥˇ ㄊㄨˇ ㄙ)) (?–?)
- Chiefdom of Dongwu (動烏土司(ㄉㄨㄥˋ ㄨ ㄊㄨˇ ㄙ)) (?–?)
- Chiefdom of Wude (烏得土司(ㄨ ㄉㄜˊ ㄊㄨˇ ㄙ)) (?–?)
- Chiefdom of Zhanda (盞達土司(ㄓㄢˇ ㄉㄚˊ ㄊㄨˇ ㄙ)) (?–?)
- Chiefdom of Husa (戶撒土司(ㄏㄨˋ ㄙㄚˇ ㄊㄨˇ ㄙ)) (?–?)
- Chiefdom of Lasa (臘撒土司(ㄌㄚˋ ㄙㄚˇ ㄊㄨˇ ㄙ)) (?–?)
- Chiefdom of Wuding of Na-shi (武定那氏土司(ㄨˇ ㄉㄧㄥˋ ㄋㄚˋ ㄕˋ ㄊㄨˇ ㄙ)) (?–?) – Ruled by the House of Na (那) of Yi descent
- Chiefdom of Xuanwei of An-shi (宣威安氏土司(ㄒㄩㄢ ㄨㄟ ㄢ ㄕˋ ㄊㄨˇ ㄙ)) (?–?) – Ruled by the House of An (安) of Yi descent
- Chiefdom of Qiongbu (邛部土司(ㄑㄩㄥˊ ㄅㄨˋ ㄊㄨˇ ㄙ)) (?–?) – Ruled by the House of Ling (嶺) of Yi descent
- Chiefdom of Mengmeng (猛猛土司(ㄇㄥˇ ㄇㄥˇ ㄊㄨˇ ㄙ)) (?–?) – Ruled by the House of Han (罕) of Dai descent
- Chiefdom of Mengsa (猛撒土司(ㄇㄥˇ ㄙㄚˇ ㄊㄨˇ ㄙ)) (?–?) – Ruled by the House of Han (罕) of Dai descent
- Chiefdom of Alinzhai (阿林寨土司(ㄚ ㄌㄧㄣˊ ㄓㄞˋ ㄊㄨˇ ㄙ)) (?–?) – Ruled by the House of Yang (楊)
- Chiefdom of Mangshuizhai (莽水寨土司(ㄇㄤˇ ㄕㄨㄟˇ ㄓㄞˋ ㄊㄨˇ ㄙ)) (?–?) – Ruled by the House of Mang (莽)
- Chiefdom of Banhong (班洪土司(ㄅㄢ ㄏㄨㄥˊ ㄊㄨˇ ㄙ)) (?–?) – Ruled by the House of Hu (胡) of Wa descent
- Chiefdom of Malong Prefecture (馬龍州土司(ㄇㄚˇ ㄌㄨㄥˊ ㄓㄡ ㄊㄨˇ ㄙ)) (?–?) – Ruled by the House of Sha (沙) of Yi descent and the House of Chang (常) of Yi descent
- Chiefdom of Luzhang (魯掌土司(ㄌㄨˇ ㄓㄤˇ ㄊㄨˇ ㄙ)) (?–?) – Ruled by the House of Cha (茶) of Yi descent
- Chiefdom of Denggeng (登埂土司(ㄉㄥ ㄍㄥˇ ㄊㄨˇ ㄙ)) (?–?) – Ruled by the House of Duan (段) of Bai descent
- Chiefdom of Maozhao (卯照土司(ㄇㄠˇ ㄓㄠˋ ㄊㄨˇ ㄙ)) (?–?) – Ruled by the House of Duan (段) of Bai descent
- Chiefdom of Shangwujing (上五井土司(ㄕㄤˋ ㄨˇ ㄐㄧㄥˇ ㄊㄨˇ ㄙ)) (?–?) – Ruled by the House of Yang (楊) of Bai descent
- Chiefdom of Lazong (剌宗土司(ㄌㄚˋ ㄗㄨㄥ ㄊㄨˇ ㄙ)) (?–?)
- Chiefdom of Bolijia (孛里加土司(ㄅㄛˊ ㄌㄧˇ ㄐㄧㄚ ㄊㄨˇ ㄙ)) (?–?)
- Chiefdom of Duobasansun (多八三孫土司(ㄉㄨㄛ ㄅㄚ ㄙㄢ ㄙㄨㄣ ㄊㄨˇ ㄙ)) (?–?)
- Chiefdom of Jiaba (加八土司(ㄐㄧㄚ ㄅㄚ ㄊㄨˇ ㄙ)) (?–?)
- Chiefdom of Zhaori (兆日土司(ㄓㄠˋ ㄖˋ ㄊㄨˇ ㄙ)) (?–?)
- Chiefdom of Nazhu (納竹土司(ㄋㄚˋ ㄓㄨˊ ㄊㄨˇ ㄙ)) (?–?)
- Chiefdom of Lunda (倫答土司(ㄌㄨㄣˊ ㄉㄚˊ ㄊㄨˇ ㄙ)) (?–?)
- Chiefdom of Guoyou (果由土司(ㄍㄨㄛˇ ㄧㄡˊ ㄊㄨˇ ㄙ)) (?–?)
- Chiefdom of Shalikehahudi (沙里可哈忽的土司(ㄕㄚ ㄌㄧˇ ㄎㄜˇ ㄏㄚ ㄏㄨ ㄉㄧˋ ㄊㄨˇ ㄙ)) (?–?)
- Chiefdom of Salitu'er (撒里土兒土司(ㄙㄚˇ ㄌㄧˇ ㄊㄨˇ ㄦˊ ㄊㄨˇ ㄙ)) (?–?)
- Chiefdom of Lacuoya (剌錯牙土司(ㄌㄚˋ ㄘㄨㄛˋ ㄧㄚˊ ㄊㄨˇ ㄙ)) (?–?)
- Chiefdom of Runzelusun (潤則魯孫土司(ㄖㄨㄣˋ ㄗㄜˊ ㄌㄨˇ ㄙㄨㄣ ㄊㄨˇ ㄙ)) (?–?)
- Chiefdom of Bujiucun (部舊村土司(ㄅㄨˋ ㄐㄧㄡˋ ㄘㄨㄣ ㄊㄨˇ ㄙ)) (?–?) – Ruled by the House of Bai (白) of Hani descent
- Chiefdom of Manchexiang (慢車鄉土司(ㄇㄢˋ ㄔㄜ ㄒㄧㄤ ㄊㄨˇ ㄙ)) (?–?) – Ruled by the House of Diao (刁) of Dai descent
- Chiefdom of Menghua (蒙化土司(ㄇㄥˊ ㄏㄨㄚˋ ㄊㄨˇ ㄙ)) (?–?) – Ruled by the House of Zuo (左) of Yi descent
- Chiefdom of Yuanjiang (元江土司(ㄩㄢˊ ㄐㄧㄤ ㄊㄨˇ ㄙ)) (?–?) – Ruled by the House of Na (那) of Dai descent
- Chiefdom of Shidian (施甸土司(ㄕ ㄉㄧㄢˋ ㄊㄨˇ ㄙ)) (?–?)
- Chiefdom of Zhendao (鎮道土司(ㄓㄣˋ ㄉㄠˋ ㄊㄨˇ ㄙ)) (?–?)
- Chiefdom of Ailin (艾林土司(ㄞˋ ㄌㄧㄣˊ ㄊㄨˇ ㄙ)) (?–?)
- Chiefdom of Badi (壩底土司(ㄅㄚˋ ㄉㄧˇ ㄊㄨˇ ㄙ)) (?–?)
- Chiefdom of Zhanzangxianjiecu (占藏先結簇土司(ㄓㄢˋ ㄗㄤˋ ㄒㄧㄢ ㄐㄧㄝˊ ㄘㄨˋ ㄊㄨˇ ㄙ)) (?–?)
- Chiefdom of Fashandongcu (發山洞簇土司(ㄈㄚ ㄕㄢ ㄉㄨㄥˋ ㄘㄨˋ ㄊㄨˇ ㄙ)) (?–?)
- Chiefdom of Banbancu (班班簇土司(ㄅㄢ ㄅㄢ ㄘㄨˋ ㄊㄨˇ ㄙ)) (?–?)
- Chiefdom of Sinang'ercu (思曩兒簇土司(ㄙ ㄋㄤˇ ㄦˊ ㄘㄨˋ ㄊㄨˇ ㄙ)) (?–?)
- Chiefdom of Ayongcu (阿用簇土司(ㄚ ㄩㄥˋ ㄘㄨˋ ㄊㄨˇ ㄙ)) (?–?)
- Chiefdom of Panwozhai (潘斡寨土司(ㄆㄢ ㄨㄛˋ ㄓㄞˋ ㄊㄨˇ ㄙ)) (?–?)
- Chiefdom of Balang (八郎土司(ㄅㄚ ㄌㄤˊ ㄊㄨˇ ㄙ)) (?–?)
- Chiefdom of Ajiaozhai (阿角寨土司(ㄚ ㄐㄧㄠˇ ㄓㄞˋ ㄊㄨˇ ㄙ)) (?–?)
- Chiefdom of Xintian (新添土司(ㄒㄧㄣ ㄊㄧㄢ ㄊㄨˇ ㄙ)) (?–?)
- Chiefdom of Bapingzhai (把平寨土司(ㄅㄚˇ ㄆㄧㄥˊ ㄓㄞˋ ㄊㄨˇ ㄙ)) (?–?)
- Chiefdom of Danxing (丹行土司(ㄉㄢ ㄒㄧㄥˊ ㄊㄨˇ ㄙ)) (?–?)
- Zhoucheng (周城(ㄓㄡ ㄔㄥˊ)) (?–?) – Ruled by the House of Ji (姬) of Huaxia descent
- Baidi (白狄(ㄅㄞˊ ㄉㄧˊ)) (?–?) – Ruled by the House of Ji (姬) of Beidi descent
- Chidi (赤狄(ㄔˋ ㄉㄧˊ)) (?–?)
- Changdi (長狄(ㄔㄤˊ ㄉㄧˊ)) (?–?) – Ruled by the House of Qi (漆) of Beidi descent
  - Souman (鄋瞞(ㄙㄡ ㄇㄢˊ)) (?–?)
- Jiuli (九黎(ㄐㄧㄡˇ ㄌㄧˊ)) (?–?) – Ruled by the House of Jiang (姜) of Huaxia descent
- Sanmiao (三苗(ㄙㄢ ㄇㄧㄠˊ)) (?–?) – Ruled by the House of Ji (姬) of Huaxia descent
- Yuyi (於夷(ㄩˊ ㄧˊ)) (?–?)
- Fangyi (方夷(ㄈㄤ ㄧˊ)) (?–?)
- Huangyi (黃夷(ㄏㄨㄤˊ ㄧˊ)) (?–?)
- Baiyi (白夷(ㄅㄞˊ ㄧˊ)) (?–?)
- Chiyi (赤夷(ㄔˋ ㄧˊ)) (?–?)
- Xuanyi (玄夷(ㄒㄩㄢˊ ㄧˊ)) (?–?)
- Fengyi (風夷(ㄈㄥ ㄧˊ)) (?–?)
- Yangyi (陽夷(ㄧㄤˊ ㄧˊ)) (?–?)
- Maorong (茅戎(ㄇㄠˊ ㄖㄨㄥˊ)) (?–?)
- Shenrong (申戎(ㄕㄣ ㄖㄨㄥˊ)) (?–?)
- Rong of Yun clan (允姓之戎(ㄩㄣˇ ㄒㄧㄥˋ ㄓ ㄖㄨㄥˊ)) (?–?) – Ruled by the House of Yun (允) of Xirong descent
  - Luhun (陸渾(ㄌㄨˋ ㄏㄨㄣˊ)) (?–?)
  - Yinrong (陰戎(ㄧㄣ ㄖㄨㄥˊ)) (?–?)
  - Rong of Yiluo (伊洛之戎(ㄧ ㄌㄨㄛˋ ㄓ ㄖㄨㄥˊ)) (?–?)
  - Rong of Jiuzhou (九州之戎(ㄐㄧㄡˇ ㄓㄡ ㄓ ㄖㄨㄥˊ)) (?–?)
- Rong of Shihu (始呼之戎(ㄕˇ ㄏㄨ ㄓ ㄖㄨㄥˊ)) (?–?)
- Rong of Yitu (翳徒之戎(ㄧˋ ㄊㄨˊ ㄓ ㄖㄨㄥˊ)) (?–?)
- Shangfang (商方(ㄕㄤ ㄈㄤ)) (?–?) – Ruled by the House of Zi (子) of Huaxia descent
- Zifang (子方(ㄗˇ ㄈㄤ)) (?–?)
- Tufang (土方(ㄊㄨˇ ㄈㄤ)) (?–?)
- Hongfang (𢀛方(ㄏㄨㄥ ㄈㄤ)) (?–?)
- Guifang (鬼方(ㄍㄨㄟˇ ㄈㄤ)) (?–?)
- Kufang (苦方(ㄎㄨˇ ㄈㄤ)) (?–?)
- Longfang (龍方(ㄌㄨㄥˊ ㄈㄤ)) (?–?)
- Mafang (馬方(ㄇㄚˇ ㄈㄤ)) (?–?)
- Shufang (蜀方(ㄕㄨˇ ㄈㄤ)) (?–?)
- Yufang (盂方(ㄩˊ ㄈㄤ)) (?–?)
- Eastern Yufang (東盂方(ㄉㄨㄥ ㄩˊ ㄈㄤ)) (?–?)
- Western Yufang (西盂方(ㄒㄧ ㄩˊ ㄈㄤ)) (?–?)
- Qiangfang (羌方(ㄑㄧㄤ ㄈㄤ)) (?–?)
- Zhafang (𠭯方(ㄓㄚ ㄈㄤ)) (?–?)
- Peifang (轡方(ㄆㄟˋ ㄈㄤ)) (?–?)
- Erbangfang (二邦方(ㄦˋ ㄅㄤ ㄈㄤ)) (?–?)
- Renfang (人方(ㄖㄣˊ ㄈㄤ)) (?–?)
- Tangfang (唐方(ㄊㄤˊ ㄈㄤ)) (?–?)
- Linfang (林方(ㄌㄧㄣˊ ㄈㄤ)) (?–?)
- Yuexifang (越戲方(ㄩㄝˋ ㄒㄧˋ ㄈㄤ)) (?–?)
- Xingfang (興方(ㄒㄧㄥ ㄈㄤ)) (?–?)
- Shifang (豕方(ㄕˇ ㄈㄤ)) (?–?)
- Weifang (危方(ㄨㄟ ㄈㄤ)) (?–?)
- Pangfang (旁方(ㄆㄤˊ ㄈㄤ)) (?–?)
- Gefang (戈方(ㄍㄜ ㄈㄤ)) (?–?)
- Mufang (木方(ㄇㄨˋ ㄈㄤ)) (?–?)
- Zhoufang (宙方(ㄓㄡˋ ㄈㄤ)) (?–?)
- Genfang (亙方(ㄍㄣˋ ㄈㄤ)) (?–?)
- Jifang (基方(ㄐㄧ ㄈㄤ)) (?–?)
- Yafang (亞方(ㄧㄚˋ ㄈㄤ)) (?–?)
- Shifang (示方(ㄕˋ ㄈㄤ)) (?–?)
- Shaofang (召方(ㄕㄠˋ ㄈㄤ)) (?–?)
- Jianfang (湔方(ㄐㄧㄢ ㄈㄤ)) (?–?)
- Yinfang (印方(ㄧㄣˋ ㄈㄤ)) (?–?)
- Jifang (祭方(ㄐㄧˋ ㄈㄤ)) (?–?)
- Hufang (虎方(ㄏㄨˇ ㄈㄤ)) (?–?)
- Weifang (微方(ㄨㄟ ㄈㄤ)) (?–?)
- Bufang (步方(ㄅㄨˋ ㄈㄤ)) (?–?)
- Xifang (息方(ㄒㄧ ㄈㄤ)) (?–?)
- Diefang (眣方(ㄉㄧㄝˊ ㄈㄤ)) (?–?)
- Zhifang (止方(ㄓˇ ㄈㄤ)) (?–?)
- Yinfang (尹方(ㄧㄣˇ ㄈㄤ)) (?–?)
- Zengfang (曾方(ㄗㄥ ㄈㄤ)) (?–?)
- Zhufang (祝方(ㄓㄨˋ ㄈㄤ)) (?–?)
- Nongfang (弄方(ㄋㄨㄥˋ ㄈㄤ)) (?–?)
- Chuifang (吹方(ㄔㄨㄟ ㄈㄤ)) (?–?)
- Chefang (屮方(ㄔㄜˋ ㄈㄤ)) (?–?)
- Quefang (雀方(ㄑㄩㄝˋ ㄈㄤ)) (?–?)
- Shifang (矢方(ㄕˇ ㄈㄤ)) (?–?)
- Yufang (鬱方(ㄩˋ ㄈㄤ)) (?–?)
- Xiufang (羞方(ㄒㄧㄡ ㄈㄤ)) (?–?)
- Beifang (貝方(ㄅㄟˋ ㄈㄤ)) (?–?)
- Cangfang (倉方(ㄘㄤ ㄈㄤ)) (?–?)
- Yangfang (昜方(ㄧㄤˊ ㄈㄤ)) (?–?)
- Foufang (缶方(ㄈㄡˇ ㄈㄤ)) (?–?)
- Pengfang (彭方(ㄆㄥˊ ㄈㄤ)) (?–?)
- Songfang (宋方(ㄙㄨㄥˋ ㄈㄤ)) (?–?)
- Danfang (丹方(ㄉㄢ ㄈㄤ)) (?–?)
- Xiangfang (絴方(ㄒㄧㄤˊ ㄈㄤ)) (?–?)
- Banfang (班方(ㄅㄢ ㄈㄤ)) (?–?)
- Youmin-shi (有緡氏(ㄧㄡˇ ㄇㄧㄣˊ ㄕˋ)) (?–?) – Ruled by the House of Yao (姚) of Huaxia descent
- Youshi-shi (有施氏(ㄧㄡˇ ㄕ ㄕˋ)) (?–?)
- Zhenxun-shi (斟鄩氏(ㄓㄣ ㄒㄩㄣˊ ㄕˋ)) (?–?) – Ruled by the House of Si (姒) of Huaxia descent
- Youhu-shi (有扈氏(ㄧㄡˇ ㄏㄨˋ ㄕˋ)) (?–?) – Ruled by the House of Si (姒) of Huaxia descent
- Youyi-shi (有易氏(ㄧㄡˇ ㄧˋ ㄕˋ)) (?–?) – Ruled by the House of Si (姒) of Huaxia descent
- Younan-shi (有男氏(ㄧㄡˇ ㄋㄢˊ ㄕˋ)) (?–?) – Ruled by the House of Si (姒) of Huaxia descent
- Tongcheng-shi (彤城氏(ㄊㄨㄥˊ ㄔㄥˊ ㄕˋ)) (?–?) – Ruled by the House of Si (姒) of Huaxia descent
- Zhenguan-shi (斟灌氏(ㄓㄣ ㄍㄨㄢˋ ㄕˋ)) (?–?) – Ruled by the House of Si (姒) of Huaxia descent
- Youxin-shi (有莘氏(ㄧㄡˇ ㄒㄧㄣ ㄕˋ)) (?–?) – Ruled by the House of Si (姒) of Huaxia descent
- Youxiong clan (有熊氏(ㄧㄡˇ ㄒㄩㄥˊ ㄕˋ)) (?–?)
- Youjiao-shi (有蟜氏(ㄧㄡˇ ㄐㄧㄠˇ ㄕˋ)) (?–?)
- Youreng-shi (有仍氏(ㄧㄡˇ ㄖㄥˊ ㄕˋ)) (?–?)
- Bao-shi (褒氏(ㄅㄠ ㄕˋ)) (?–?)
- Fei-shi (費氏(ㄈㄟˋ ㄕˋ)) (?–?)
- Qi-shi (杞氏(ㄑㄧˇ ㄕˋ)) (?–?)
- Zeng-shi (繒氏(ㄗㄥ ㄕˋ)) (?–?)
- Xin-shi (辛氏(ㄒㄧㄣ ㄕˋ)) (?–?)
- Ming-shi (冥氏(ㄇㄧㄥˊ ㄕˋ)) (?–?)
- Ge-shi (戈氏(ㄍㄜ ㄕˋ)) (?–?)
- Youqiong-shi (有窮氏(ㄧㄡˇ ㄑㄩㄥˊ ㄕˋ)) (?–?)
- Youge-shi (有鬲氏(ㄧㄡˇ ㄍㄜˊ ㄕˋ)) (?–?)
- Boming-shi (伯明氏(ㄅㄛˊ ㄇㄧㄥˊ ㄕˋ)) (?–?) – Ruled by the House of Yun (妘) of Dongyi descent
- Ji (及(ㄐㄧˊ)) (?–?)
- You (攸(ㄧㄡ)) (?–?) – Ruled by the House of Zi (子) of Huaxia descent
- Meng (盟(ㄇㄥˊ)) (?–?)
- Shen (侁(ㄕㄣ)) (?–?)
- Gao (告(ㄍㄠˋ)) (?–?)
- Er (耳(ㄦˇ)) (?–?)
- Feng (逢(ㄈㄥˊ)) (?–?)
- Bao (暴(ㄅㄠˋ)) (?–?)
- Shu (黍(ㄕㄨˇ)) (?–?)
- Zhu (竹(ㄓㄨˊ)) (?–?)
- Dun (盾(ㄉㄨㄣˋ)) (?–?)
- Ji (計(ㄐㄧˋ)) (?–?) – Ruled by the House of Si (姒) of Huaxia descent
- Tui (魋(ㄊㄨㄟˊ)) (?–?)
- Ke (可(ㄎㄜˇ)) (?–?)
- Chou (醜(ㄔㄡˇ)) (?–?)
- Gu (雇(ㄍㄨˋ)) (?–?)
- Er (兒(ㄦˊ)) (?–?)
- Mao (髳(ㄇㄠˊ)) (?–?)
- Feng (豐(ㄈㄥ)) (?–?)
- He (禾(ㄏㄜˊ)) (?–?)
- Bing (丙(ㄅㄧㄥˇ)) (?–?)
- Xian (先(ㄒㄧㄢ)) (?–?)
- Hao (鎬(ㄏㄠˋ)) (?–?)
- Li (酈(ㄌㄧˋ)) (?–?)
- Nuo (郍(ㄋㄨㄛˊ)) (?–?)
- Gu (顧(ㄍㄨˋ)) (?–?) – Ruled by the House of Ji (己) of Huaxia descent
- Lu (鹿(ㄌㄨˋ)) (?–?)
- Jian (戔(ㄐㄧㄢ)) (?–?)
- Gan (干(ㄍㄢ)) (?–?)
- Quanrong (犬戎(ㄑㄩㄢˇ ㄖㄨㄥˊ)) (?–?)
- Rong of Jiang clan (姜姓之戎(ㄐㄧㄤ ㄒㄧㄥˋ ㄓ ㄖㄨㄥˊ)) (?–?) – Ruled by the House of Jiang (姜) of Xirong descent
  - Jiangrong (姜戎(ㄐㄧㄤ ㄖㄨㄥˊ)) (?–?)
- Lu (鹿(ㄌㄨˋ)) (?–?)
- Jiuyuan (九苑(ㄐㄧㄡˇ ㄩㄢˋ)) (?–?)
- Shangsi (上絲(ㄕㄤˋ ㄙ)) (?–?)
- Xiawei (下危(ㄒㄧㄚˋ ㄨㄟ)) (?–?)
- Northern Qi (北齊(ㄅㄟˇ ㄑㄧˊ)) (?–?) – Ruled by the House of Jiang (姜) of Huaxia descent
- Zhi (沚(ㄓˇ)) (?–?)
- Lü (呂(ㄌㄩˇ)) (?–?) – Ruled by the House of Jiang (姜) of Huaxia descent
- Southern Yan (南燕(ㄋㄢˊ ㄧㄢ)) (?–?) – Ruled by the House of Ji (姞) of Huaxia descent
- Ge (葛(ㄍㄜˊ)) (?–?) – Ruled by the House of Ying (嬴) of Huaxia descent
- Shan (單(ㄕㄢˋ)) (?–?) – Ruled by the House of Ji (姬) of Huaxia descent
- Gan (甘(ㄍㄢ)) (?–?) – Ruled by the House of Ji (姬) of Huaxia descent
- Bi (偪(ㄅㄧ)) (?–?) – Ruled by the House of Ji (姞) of Huaxia descent
- Mi (密(ㄇㄧˋ)) (?–?) – Ruled by the House of Ji (姬) of Huaxia descent
- Yu (邘(ㄩˊ)) (?–?) – Ruled by the House of Ji (姬) of Huaxia descent
- Du (杜(ㄉㄨˋ)) (?–?) – Ruled by the House of Qi (祁) of Huaxia descent
- Bulang (不羹(ㄅㄨˋ ㄌㄤˊ)) (?–?) – Ruled by the House of Ying (嬴) of Huaxia descent
  - Eastern Bulang (東不羹(ㄉㄨㄥ ㄅㄨˋ ㄌㄤˊ)) (?–?)
  - Western Bulang (西不羹(ㄒㄧ ㄅㄨˋ ㄌㄤˊ)) (?–?)
- Dao (道(ㄉㄠˋ)) (?–?)
- Chong (崇(ㄔㄨㄥˊ)) (?–?) – Ruled by the House of Si (姒) of Huaxia descent
- Di (翟(ㄉㄧˊ)) (?–?) – Ruled by the House of Kui (隗) of Chidi descent
- Ji (㠱(ㄐㄧˋ)) (?–?) – Ruled by the House of Jiang (姜) of Huaxia descent
- Yan (鄢(ㄧㄢ)) (?–?)
- Chou (疇(ㄔㄡˊ)) (?–?) – Ruled by the House of Ren (任) of Huaxia descent
- Shen (沈(ㄕㄣˇ)) (?–?) – Ruled by the House of Ji (姬) of Huaxia descent
- Si (姒(ㄙˋ)) (?–?) – Ruled by the House of Ji (姬) of Huaxia descent
- Ru (蓐(ㄖㄨˋ)) (?–?) – Ruled by the House of Ji (姬) of Huaxia descent
- Huang (黃(ㄏㄨㄤˊ)) (?–?)
- Peng (倗(ㄆㄥˊ)) (?–?)
- Guan (貫(ㄍㄨㄢˋ)) (?–?)
- Jiafu (甲父(ㄐㄧㄚˇ ㄈㄨˋ)) (?–?)
- Zhu (鑄(ㄓㄨˋ)) (?–?) – Ruled by the House of Ren (妊) of Huaxia descent
- Ba (霸(ㄅㄚˋ)) (?–?) – Ruled by the House of Kui (媿) of Huaxia descent
- Nie (聶(ㄋㄧㄝˋ)) (?–?) – Ruled by the House of Jiang (姜) of Huaxia descent
- Fei (費(ㄈㄟˋ)) (?–?) – Ruled by the House of Si (姒) of Huaxia descent
- Yu (鄅(ㄩˇ)) (?–?) – Ruled by the House of Yun (妘) of Huaxia descent
- Jue (厥(ㄐㄩㄝˊ)) (?–?)
- Ren (任(ㄖㄣˋ)) (?–?) – Ruled by the House of Feng (風) of Huaxia descent
- Mou (牟(ㄇㄡˊ)) (?–?)
- Guan (觀(ㄍㄨㄢ)) (?–?) – Ruled by the House of Yao (姚) of Huaxia descent
- Han (寒(ㄏㄢˊ)) (?–?) – Ruled by the House of Ren (任) of Huaxia descent
- Zong (鬷(ㄗㄨㄥ)) (?–?) – Ruled by the House of Dong (董) of Huaxia descent
- Yan (奄(ㄧㄢˇ)) (?–?)
- Pang (逄(ㄆㄤˊ)) (?–?)
- Yi (夷(ㄧˊ)) (?–?) – Ruled by the House of Yun (妘) of Huaxia descent
- Quegong (闕鞏(ㄑㄩㄝˋ ㄍㄨㄥˇ)) (?–?)
- Zhuanyu (顓臾(ㄓㄨㄢ ㄩˊ)) (?–?) – Ruled by the House of Feng (風) of Huaxia descent
- Fei (費(ㄈㄟˋ)) (?–?) – Ruled by the House of Ji (姬) of Huaxia descent
- Zhi (摯(ㄓˋ)) (?–?) – Ruled by the House of Ren (任) of Huaxia descent
- Zhu (諸(ㄓㄨ)) (?–?) – Ruled by the House of Si (姒) of Huaxia descent
- Jie (介(ㄐㄧㄝˋ)) (?–?) – Ruled by the House of Yun (妘) of Dongyi descent
- Kan (闞(ㄎㄢˋ)) (?–?)
- You (鄾(ㄧㄡ)) (?–?) – Ruled by the House of Man (曼) of Huaxia descent
- Zong (宗(ㄗㄨㄥ)) (?–?) – Ruled by the House of Yan (偃) of Huaxia descent
- Guo (過(ㄎㄢˋ)) (?–?) – Ruled by the House of Ren (任) of Huaxia descent
- Rong of Ji clan (己姓之戎(ㄐㄧˇ ㄒㄧㄥˋ ㄓ ㄖㄨㄥˊ)) (?–?) – Ruled by the House of Ji (己) of Xirong descent
- Zhen (軫(ㄓㄣˇ)) (?–?) – Ruled by the House of Yan (偃) of Huaxia descent
- Yun (鄖(ㄩㄣˊ)) (?–?) – Ruled by the House of Ying (嬴) of Huaxia descent
- Dai (代(ㄉㄞˋ)) (?–?) – Ruled by the House of Zi (子) of Beidi descent
- Fengfu (封父(ㄈㄥ ㄈㄨˋ)) (?–?) – Ruled by the House of Jiang (姜) of Huaxia descent
- Anling (安陵(ㄢ ㄌㄧㄥˊ)) (?–?)
- Mie (蔑(ㄇㄧㄝˋ)) (?–?)
- Er (貳(ㄦˋ)) (?–?)
- Zhou (州(ㄓㄡ)) (?–?) – Ruled by the House of Yan (偃) of Huaxia descent
- Tong (桐(ㄊㄨㄥˊ)) (?–?) – Ruled by the House of Yan (偃) of Huaxia descent
- Peng (彭(ㄆㄥˊ)) (?–?)
- Wuzhong (無終(ㄨˊ ㄓㄨㄥ)) (?–?)

=== Cyprus ===
- Komnenos dynasty (AD 1081–1191) – Cyprus under Byzantine rule (AD 1081–1185) and independent Cyprus during the reign of Isaac Komnenos (AD 1185–1191)
- House of Lusignan (AD 1191–1267) – Kingdom of Cyprus
  - House of Poitiers-Lusignan (AD 1267–1489) – Kingdom of Cyprus

=== Indian Subcontinent (South Asia) ===
- Solar dynasty – Legendary
- Lunar dynasty – Legendary
- Brihadratha dynasty (c. 1760–831 BC) – Legendary
- Danava dynasty – Legendary
- Kuru kingdom (c. 1200–525 BC)
- Gonanditya dynasty (c. 1182–212 BC)
  - Restored Gonanditya dynasty (AD 25–598)
- Panchala (c. 900–400 BC)
- Ikshvaku dynasty (c. 7th century–5th century BC) – Kingdom of Kosal
- Chedi Kingdom (c. 600–300 BC)
- Haryanka dynasty (c. 544–413 BC) – Kingdom of Magadha
- Pradyota dynasty (c. 541–403 BC)
- Shaishunaga dynasty (c. 413–345 BC) – Kingdom of Magadha
- Nanda Empire (c. 345–322 BC)
- Maurya Empire (c. 321–185 BC)
- Chola dynasty (c. 4th century BC–AD 1279)
  - Later Chola dynasty (AD 1070–1279)
- Chera dynasty (c. 300 BC–AD 1124)
- Pandyan dynasty (c. 300 BC–AD 1650)
- Satavahana dynasty (c. 230 BC–AD 220)
- Shunga Empire (c. 185–75 BC)
- Mitra dynasty (c. 150–50 BC)
- Deva dynasty (2nd century–1st century BC)
- Mahameghavahana dynasty (2nd century BC–AD 4th century)
- Kanva dynasty (c. 73–28 BC)
- Northern Satraps (60 BC–AD 2nd century)
- Datta dynasty (1st century BC–AD 1st century)
- Kushan Empire (AD 30–375)
- Ningthouja dynasty (AD 33–1971)
- Western Satraps (AD 35–405)
- Nagvanshis of Chotanagpur (AD 83–1952)
- Alupa dynasty (AD 200–1444)
- Andhra Ikshvaku (c. AD 210–325)
- Sasanian dynasty (AD 224–651) – Sasanian Empire and Kushano-Sasanian Kingdom
- Vakataka dynasty (AD 250–500)
- Pallava dynasty (AD 275–897)
- Nagas of Padmavati (AD 3rd century–4th century)
- Gupta Empire (AD 3rd century–543)
- Bhojas of Goa (AD 3rd century–6th century)
- Kidarites (AD 320–500)
- Kadamba dynasty (AD 345–540)
  - Kadambas of Hangal (AD 980–14th century)
  - Kadambas of Goa (AD 10th century–14th century)
  - Kadambas of Halasi
- Western Ganga dynasty (AD 350–1000)
- Aulikaras (AD 350–550)
  - Second Aulikara dynasty (AD 4th century–6th century) – Aulikara Empire
- Varman dynasty (AD 350–655)
- Traikutaka dynasty (AD 388–456)
- Vishnukundina dynasty (AD 420–624)
- Rai dynasty (AD 489–632)
- Later Gupta dynasty (AD 490–750)
- Maitraka dynasty (AD 493–776)
- Uchchhakalpa dynasty (AD 5th century–6th century)
- Sharabhapuriya dynasty (AD 5th century–6th century)
- Pitrbhakta dynasty (AD 5th century–6th century)
- Parivrajaka dynasty (AD 5th century–6th century)
- Chalukya dynasty (AD 543–753)
  - Western Chalukya Empire (AD 973–1189)
- Maukhari dynasty (AD 550–606)
- Taank Kingdom (AD 550–700)
- Gurjaras of Lata (AD 580–738)
- Gauda Kingdom (AD 590–626)
- Pushyabhuti dynasty (AD 6th century–7th century)
- Kalachuri dynasty (AD 6th century–7th century)
- Panduvamshis of Mekala (AD 6th century–7th century)
- Nala dynasty (AD 6th century–8th century)
- Shailodbhava dynasty (AD 6th century–8th century)
- Patola Shahis (AD 6th century–8th century)
- Pratiharas of Mandavyapura (AD 6th century–9th century)
- Chahamanas of Shakambhari (AD 6th century–12th century)
  - Chahamanas of Naddula (AD 950–1197)
    - Chahamanas of Jalor (AD 1160–1311)
- Telugu Cholas (AD 6th century–13th century)
  - Velanati Chodas (AD 1076–1216)
  - Renati Cholas
  - Pottapi Cholas
  - Konidena Cholas
  - Nannuru Cholas
  - Nidugal Cholas
  - Nellore Chodas
- Kingdom of Cochin (AD 6th century–1949)
- Jethwa dynasty (AD 620–1948)
- Eastern Chalukyas (AD 624–1189)
- Khadga dynasty (AD 625–8th century)
- Karkota Empire (AD 625–885)
- Brahman dynasty of Sindh (AD 632–724)
- Mlechchha dynasty (AD 650–900)
- Jethwa dynasty (AD 690–1948)
- Panduvamshis of Dakshina Kosala (AD 7th century–8th century)
- Patola Shahi dynasty (AD 7th century–8th century)
- Kalachuris of Tripuri (AD 7th century–13th century)
- Katyuri kings (AD 700–1200)
- Chand kings (AD 700–1790)
- Gurjara-Pratihara dynasty (AD 730–1036)
- Saindhava (AD 735–920)
- Tomara dynasty (AD 736–1152)
- Pala Empire (AD 750–1174)
- Rashtrakuta dynasty (AD 753–982)
- Shilahara dynasty (AD 765–13th 1265)
  - South Konkan branch (AD 765–1020)
  - North Konkan branch (AD 800–1265)
  - Kolhapur branch (AD 940–1212)
- Trakhan dynasty (AD 780–1821)
- Bhauma-Kara dynasty (AD 8th century–10th century)
- Kongu Chera dynasty (AD 845–1150)
- Hindu Shahi (AD 850–1026)
- Habbari dynasty (AD 854–1011)
- Utpala dynasty (AD 855–1003)
- Seuna dynasty (AD 860–1317)
- Ghurid dynasty (AD 879–1215)
- Ma'danids (AD 9th century–11th century)
- Paramara dynasty (AD 9th century–1305)
- Perumal dynasty of Kerala (AD 9th century–12th century)
- Chandelas of Jejakabhukti (AD 9th century–13th century)
- Chudasama dynasty (AD 9th century–1472)
- Chandra dynasty (AD 900–1050)
- Pala dynasty (AD 900–1100)
- Pandalam dynasty (AD 903–1820)
- Chaulukya dynasty (AD 940–1244)
- Chalukyas of Lata (AD 970–1070)
- Lodi dynasty of Multan (AD 970s–1010) – Emirate of Multan
- Ghaznavid dynasty (AD 977–1186)
- Kamboja Pala dynasty (AD 10th century–11th century)
- Barha dynasty (AD 10th century–20th century)
  - Rohilla dynasty (AD 1721–1947)
- Lohara dynasty (AD 1003–1320)
- Hoysala Empire (AD 1026–1343)
- Soomra dynasty (AD 1026–1356)
- Sena dynasty (AD 1070–1230)
- Eastern Ganga dynasty (AD 1078–1434)
- Gahadavala dynasty (AD 1089–1197)
- Karnat dynasty (AD 1097–1324)
- Kalachuris of Ratnapura (AD 11th century–13th century)
- Pithipatis of Bodh Gaya (AD 11th century–13th century)
- Khasa-Malla Kingdom (AD 11th century–14th century)
- Kota Vamsa (AD 1108–1268)
- Zamorin of Calicut (AD 1124–1806)
- Kalachuris of Kalyani (AD 1156–1181)
- Poonjar dynasty (AD 1160–1947)
- Kakatiya dynasty (AD 1163–1323)
- Kalachuris of Kalyani (AD 1164–1181)
- Chutiya Kingdom (AD 1187–1673)
- Maqpon dynasty (AD 1190–1840)
- Deva dynasty (AD 12th century–13th century)
- Chowta dynasty (AD 12th century–18th century)
- Chero dynasty (AD 12th century–19th century)
- Mamluk dynasty (AD 1206–1290) – Delhi Sultanate
- Kadava dynasty (AD 1216–1279)
- Ahom dynasty (AD 1228–1826) – Ahom Kingdom
- Vaghela dynasty (AD 1244–1304)
- Manikya dynasty (AD 1280–1947)
- Khalji dynasty (AD 1290–1320) – Delhi Sultanate
- Yajvapala dynasty (?–AD 1298)
- Musunuri Nayakas (AD 13th century–14th century)
- Dimasa Kingdom (AD 13th century-1832)
- Mukne dynasty (AD 1306–1947)
- Tughlaq dynasty (AD 1320–1413) – Delhi Sultanate
- Reddi Kingdom (AD 1325–1448)
- Oiniwar dynasty (AD 1325–1526)
- Sisodia (AD 1326–1955)
- Musunuri Nayakas (AD 1335–1368)
- Ma'bar Sultanate (AD 1335–1378)
- Sangama dynasty (AD 1336–1487) – Vijayanagara Empire
- Shah Mir dynasty (AD 1339–1561)
- Ilyas Shahi dynasty (AD 1342–1414, AD 1435–1487) – Sultanate of Bengal
- Bahmani Sultanate (AD 1347–1527)
- Samma dynasty (AD 1351–1524)
- Timurid dynasty (AD 1370–1507) – Timurid Empire
  - Mughal dynasty (AD 1526–1540, AD 1555–1857) – Mughal Empire
- Tomaras of Gwalior (AD 1375–1523)
- Farooqui dynasty (AD 1382–1601)
- Muzaffarid dynasty (AD 1391–1535, AD 1536–1573, AD 1583) – Gujarat Sultanate
- Malwa Sultanate (AD 1392–1562)
- Wadiyar dynasty (AD 1399–1950) – Kingdom of Mysore
- Tomaras of Gwalior (AD 14th century–16th century)
- Narajole Raj (AD 1400–1947)
- Manikya dynasty (AD 1400–1949)
- Kallala dynasty (AD 1404–1789)
- Ganesha dynasty (AD 1414–1435) – Sultanate of Bengal
- Sayyid dynasty (AD 1414–1451) – Delhi Sultanate
- Pemmasani Nayaks (AD 1423–1685)
- Gajapati Empire (AD 1434–1541)
- Khen dynasty (AD 1440–1498)
- Lodi dynasty (AD 1451–1526) – Delhi Sultanate
- Namgyal dynasty (AD 1470–1975)
  - Namgyal dynasty of Ladakh (AD 1470–1842)
  - Namgyal dynasty of Sikkim (AD 1642–1975)
- Saluva dynasty (AD 1485–1505) – Vijayanagara Empire
- Habshi dynasty (AD 1487–1494) – Sultanate of Bengal
- Barid Shahi dynasty (AD 1489–1619) – Bidar Sultanate
- Pratapgarh Kingdom (AD 1489–18th century)
- Imad Shahi dynasty (AD 1490–1572) – Berar Sultanate
- Nizam Shahi dynasty (AD 1490–1636) – Ahmadnagar Sultanate
- Adil Shahi dynasty (AD 1490–1686) – Bijapur Sultanate
- Tuluva dynasty (AD 1491–1570) – Vijayanagara Empire
- Hussain Shahi dynasty (AD 1494–1538) – Sultanate of Bengal
- Nayakas of Keladi (AD 1499–1763)
- Thondaiman dynasty of Aranthangi (AD 15th century–18th century)
- Koch dynasty (AD 1515–1949)
- Qutb Shahi dynasty (AD 1518–1687) – Golconda Sultanate
- Arghun dynasty (AD 1520–1554)
  - Tarkhan dynasty (AD 1554–1591)
- Madurai Nayak dynasty (AD 1529–1736)
- Sur Empire (AD 1538–1556) – Interrupted the Mughal dynasty
- Thanjavur Nayak dynasty (AD 1532–1673)
- Aravidu dynasty (AD 1542–1646) – Vijayanagara Empire
- Arakkal Kingdom (AD 1545–1819)
- Muhammad Shah dynasty (AD 1554–1564) – Sultanate of Bengal
- Raj Darbhanga (AD 1557–1947)
- Karrani dynasty (AD 1564–1612) – Sultanate of Bengal
- Katoor dynasty (AD 1570–1947)
- Nayakas of Chitradurga (AD 1588–1779)
- Bhonsle dynasty (AD 1645–1947)
  - House of Satara (AD 1708–1839)
  - House of Kolhapur (AD 1708–1946)
  - House of Nagpur (AD 1738–1853)
  - House of Thanjavur (?–AD 1855)
- Babi dynasty (AD 1654–1947)
- Pudukkottai dynasty (AD 1680–1948)
- Thondaiman dynasty of Pudukottai (AD 1686–1948)
- Kalhora dynasty (AD 1701–1783)
- Gaekwad dynasty (AD 1721–1947)
- Sial dynasty (AD 1723 – 1816)
- Asaf Jahi dynasty (AD 1724–1948)
- Travancore royal family (AD 1729–1949) – Kingdom of Travancore
- Nawab of Junagarh (AD 1730–1948)
- Holkar dynasty (AD 1731–1948)
- Scindia dynasty (AD 1731–1971)
- Nawab of Awadh (AD 1732–1818)
- Patwardhan dynasty (AD 1733–1948)
- Durrani dynasty (AD 1747–1826)
- Phulkian dynasty (AD 1763–1948)
- Newalkar dynasty (AD 1769–1858)
- Narayan dynasty (AD 1770–1948)
- Mong Circle (AD 1782–1964)
- Talpur dynasty (AD 1783–1843)
- Sikh Empire (AD 1799–1849)
- Guhila dynasty
  - Rawal branch
  - Rana branch
- Gohil dynasty
- Bandhalgoti dynasty
- Trakhàn dynasty (?–AD 1810)
- Dogra dynasty (AD 1846–1952)
- Bohmong Circle (?–AD 1964)
- Chakma Circle (?–AD 1964)
- Vidarbha Kingdom
- Bhanj dynasty
- Nolamba dynasty
- Bana kingdom

=== Indonesia ===
- Shailendra dynasty, Mataram kingdom and Srivijaya
- Sanjaya dynasty, Mataram kingdom (Central Java period)
- Ishana dynasty, Mataram kingdom (East Java period), Kahuripan kingdom, Janggala and Kediri kingdom
- Mauli dynasty (1183–?), Dharmasraya and Pagaruyung kingdoms
- Rajasa dynasty, Singhasari kingdom (1222–1292) and Majapahit empire (1293 – ca. 1500)
- Ambeno
- Azmatkhan
- Kingdom of Iha
- Luwu
- Warmadewa dynasty (914–1119)
  - Jaya dynasty (1133–1343)
- Sultanate of Tidore (1081, 1450–1967)
- Rajasa dynasty (1222–1292, 1294–1527)
- Sultanate of Ternate (1257–1914)
- Samudera Pasai Sultanate (1267–1521)
- Kingdom of Kaimana (1309–1440, 1808–present)
- Demak Sultanate (1475–1554)
- Sultanate of Cirebon (1479–1926)
- Aceh Sultanate (1496–1903)
  - Jamal ul-Lail dynasty (1699–1727)
  - Bugis dynasty (1727–1903)
- House of Dias Vieira Godinho (1515–1962) – Ruling house of the Kingdom of Larantuka, still maintain a ceremonial function, especially during the days leading to and during easter, but has no legal or official power (Non-sovereign)
- Malacca-Johor dynasty (1528–1699)
- Tanette (1547–?)
- House of Mataram ruling the Mataram Sultanate ((1570s (?))–1749/55) – Four successor dynasties:
  - Surakarta Sunanate (Pakubuwono) a junior branch of the House of Mataram (1755–1946) – Still maintain a ceremonial function, but has no legal or official power
  - **Hamengkubuwono** a junior branch of the House of Mataram (1755–present) – Ruling house of the Yogyakarta Sultanate (Non-sovereign)
  - **House of Mangkunegaran** a junior branch of the House of Mataram (1757–present) – Ruling house of the Kadipaten Mangkunegaran (Non-sovereign)
  - **House of Pakualaman** a junior branch of the House of Mataram (1813–present) – Ruling house of the Kadipaten Pakualaman (Non-sovereign)
- Sultanate of Sambas (1609–1956)
- Asahan Sultanate (1630–1946)
- Sultanate of Deli (1632–1946)
- Bone state (1634–1905, 1931–1950)
- Amanatun (1642–1962)
- Amabi (1652–1917)
- Bendahara dynasty (1699–1911)
- Amarasi (?–1962)
- Sultanate of Siak Sri Indrapura (1723–1946)
- Sultanate of Serdang (1728–?)

=== Iran (Persia) ===
- Pishdadian dynasty – Mythical
- Kayanian dynasty – Semi-mythical
- Awan dynasty (2350–2150 BC)
- Shimashki dynasty (2200–1900 BC)
- Sukkalmah dynasty (1900–1500 BC)
- Achaemenid dynasty (c. 730–330 BC) – Achaemenid Kingdom and Achaemenid Empire; Ruled by the Pasargadae tribe of the Persians
  - Teispids (675–522 BC) – Historiographical nomenclature denoting the line of Achaemenid rulers descended from Teispes
- Median dynasty (678–549 BC) – Ruled by the Medes
- Arsacid dynasty (247 BC–AD 224) – Ruled by the Parni tribe of the Eastern Iranians
- Kamnaskirid dynasty (147 BC–AD 25)
- Sasanian dynasty (AD 224–590, AD 591–651)
  - Dabuyid dynasty (AD 642–760)
    - Paduspanid dynasty (AD 655–1598)
  - Bavand dynasty (AD 651–1349)
- Qarinvand dynasty (AD 550s–11th century) – Ruled by the Parni tribe of the Eastern Iranians
- House of Mihran (AD 590–591, AD 629) – Ruled by the Parni tribe of the Eastern Iranians
- House of Ispahbudhan (AD 591–596, AD 630–631) – Ruled by the Parni tribe of the Eastern Iranians
- Zarmihrids (AD 6th century–785) – Ruled by the Parni tribe of the Eastern Iranians
- Masmughans of Damavand (AD 651–760) – Ruled by the Parni tribe of the Eastern Iranians
- Justanid dynasty (AD 791–11th century)
- Dulafid dynasty (AD 800–897) – Ruled by the Banu Ijl tribe of the Arabs
- Samanid dynasty (AD 819–999) – Ruled by the Iranians
- Tahirid dynasty (AD 821–873) – Ruled by the Persians
- Saffarid dynasty (AD 861–913, AD 923–1003) – Ruled by the Eastern Iranians
- House of Ali (AD 864–900, AD 914–928) – Ruled by the Banu Hashim tribe of the Arabs
  - Hasanids
  - Husaynids
- Ghurid dynasty (AD 879–1215) – Ruled by the Tajiks
- Sajid dynasty (AD 889–929) – Ruled by the Sogdians
- Ma'danid dynasty (AD 9th century–11th century)
- Sallarid dynasty (AD 919–1062) – Ruled by the Daylamites
- Ziyarid dynasty (AD 930–1090) – Ruled by the Shahanshahvand tribe of the Gilaks
- Banu Ilyas (AD 932–968) – Ruled by the Sogdians
- Buyid dynasty (AD 934–1062) – Ruled by the Daylamites
  - Buyids of Fars (AD 933–1062)
  - Buyids of Ray, Isfahan, and Hamadan (AD 935–1038)
  - Buyids of Iraq and Khuzistan (AD 945–1055)
- Hasanwayhid dynasty (AD 959–1015) – Ruled by the Barzikani tribe of the Kurds
- Ghaznavid dynasty (AD 977–1186) – Ruled by the Barskhan tribe of the Turks
- Annazid dynasty (AD 990–1116) – Ruled by the Kurds
- Kakuyid dynasty (AD 1008–1141) – Ruled by the Daylamites
- Nasrid dynasty (AD 1029–1225) – Ruled by the Eastern Iranians
- Shabankara (AD 1030–1355) – Ruled by the Kurds
  - Hazaraspids (AD 1115–1424)
- Seljuk dynasty (AD 1037–1194) – Seljuk Empire and Kerman Seljuk Sultanate; Ruled by the Qiniq tribe of the Oghuz Turks
- Eldiguzids (AD 1136–1225) – Ruled by the Kipchak tribe of the Turks
- Atabegs of Yazd (AD 1141–1297, AD 1315–1319) – Ruled by the Persians
- Salghurids (AD 1148–1282) – Ruled by the Salur tribe of the Turkmens
- Anushtegin dynasty (AD 1153–1220) – Iran within the Khwarazmian Empire; Ruled by the Begdili tribe of the Oghuz Turks
- Pishkinid dynasty (AD 1155–1231) – Ruled by the Georgians
- Khoy Khanate (AD 1210–1799) – Ruled by the Donboli tribe of the Kurds
- Ilkhanate (AD 1256–1353)
- Qutlugh-Khanids (AD 1222–1306) – Ruled by the Khitans; Successor to the Western Liao dynasty of China
- Kart dynasty (AD 1244–1381) – Ruled by the Tajiks
- Muzaffarid dynasty (AD 1314–1393) – Ruled by the Arabs
- House of Inju (AD 1335–1357) – Ruled by the Persians
- Chobanids (AD 1335–1357) – Ruled by the Taichiud tribe of the Mongols
- Jalairid Sultanate (AD 1336–1432) – Ruled by the Jalair tribe of the Mongols
- Afrasiyab dynasty (AD 1349–1504)
- Marashiyan dynasty (AD 1359–1596) – Ruled by the Mazanderani tribe of the Iranians
- Timurid dynasty (AD 1370–1507) – Iran within the Timurid Empire; Ruled by the Barlas tribe of the Mongols
- Kar-Kiya dynasty (AD 1370s–1592)
- Qara Qoyunlu (AD 1378–1468) – Ruled by the Yiwa tribe of the Baharlu
- Aq Qoyunlu (AD 1378–1497) – Ruled by the Bayandur tribe of the Oghuz Turks
- Emirate of Hakkâri (AD 14th century–1847) – Ruled by the Kurds
- Ardalan (AD 14th century–1868) – Ruled by the Bani Ardalan tribe of the Kurds
- Mukriyan (AD 1400–1800) – Ruled by the Kurds
- Principality of Mahmudi (AD 1406–1839) – Ruled by the Mahmudi tribe of the Kurds
- Zarrinnaal (AD 1448–1925) – Ruled by the Zarrin-Kafsh tribe of the Kurds
- Safavid dynasty (AD 1501–1722, AD 1729–1736, AD 1749–1750) – Ruled by the Bayandur tribe of the Oghuz Turks
- Emirate of Bradost (AD 1510–1609) – Ruled by the Kurds
- Principality of Pinyanişi (AD 1548–1823) – Ruled by the Pinyanişi tribe of the Kurds
- Hotak dynasty (AD 1722–1729) – Ruled by the Ghilji tribe of the Pashtuns
- Afsharid dynasty (AD 1736–1749, AD 1750–1796) – Ruled by the Afshar tribe of the Oghuz Turks
- Sarab Khanate (AD 1747–?) – Ruled by the Shekak tribe of the Kurds
- Zand dynasty (AD 1751–1794) – Ruled by the Zand tribe of the Kurds
- Tabriz Khanate (AD 1757–1799) – Ruled by the Donboli tribe of the Kurds
- Qajar dynasty (AD 1789–1925) – Ruled by the Qajar tribe of the Oghuz Turks
- Hasan Khan dynasty (AD 1795–1820) – Ruled by the Kurds
- Emirate of Muhammara (AD 19th century–1925)
- Pahlavi dynasty (AD 1925–1979) – Ruled by the Mazanderani tribe of the Iranians
- Bazrangi dynasty (?–?)

=== Israel ===
- House of Gideon
- House of Saul (c. 1020–1010 BC) – United Monarchy
- Davidic line (c. 1003–586 BC) – United Monarchy and Kingdom of Judah
- House of Jeroboam (c. 931–909 BC) – Kingdom of Israel
- House of Baasha (c. 909–885 BC) – Kingdom of Israel
- House of Zimri (c. 884 BC) – Kingdom of Israel
- House of Omri (c. 884–841 BC) – Kingdom of Israel
- House of Jehu (c. 841–752 BC) – Kingdom of Israel
- House of Shallum (c. 752 BC) – Kingdom of Israel
- House of Gadi (c. 752–740 BC) – Kingdom of Israel
- House of Pekah (c. 752–732 BC) – Kingdom of Israel
- House of Hoshea (c. 732–721 BC) – Kingdom of Israel
- Hasmonean dynasty (104–37 BC)
- Herodian dynasty (47 BC–AD 100)
- Jarrahids (AD 971–1107)
- House of Flanders (AD 1099–1118) – Kingdom of Jerusalem
- House of Rethel (AD 1118–1153) – Kingdom of Jerusalem
- House of Châteaudun (AD 1131–1185, AD 1186–1205) – Kingdom of Jerusalem
- Aleramici (AD 1183–1186, AD 1190–1192, AD 1205–1212) – Kingdom of Jerusalem
- House of Lusignan (AD 1186–1192, AD 1198–1205) – Kingdom of Jerusalem
  - House of Poitiers-Lusignan (AD 1268–1324)
- House of Brienne (AD 1210–1228) – Kingdom of Jerusalem
- Hohenstaufen (AD 1225–1268) – Kingdom of Jerusalem
- Burji dynasty (AD 1382–1517) – Palestine within the Mamluk Sultanate
- Al-Zayadina
- Ridwan dynasty (AD 1560–1690) – Hereditary non-monarchical political leaders (Non-sovereign)
- Turabay dynasty (AD 16th century–1677)

=== Japan ===
Imperial House (皇室(こうしつ)) (660 BCE–present) – called "Kōshitsu" in Japanese; The traditional founding year of 660 BCE assigned by Japanese historiography is typically considered to be legendary, however the latest date is 539 CE with Emperor Kinmei

  - Northern Court (北朝(ほくちょう)) (1331–1392) – Also called "Jimyōin line" (持明院統(じみょういんとう))
  - Southern Court (南朝(なんちょう)) (1336–1392) – Also called "Daikakuji line" (大覚寺統(だいかくじとう))
    - Later Southern Court (後南朝(ごなんちょう)) (1392–1514)
  - House of Aviz-Beja (アヴィス＝ベージャ王朝) (1580) – Nagasaki under Portuguese rule
  - Philippine dynasty (スペイン・ハプスブルク朝) (1581–1587) – Nagasaki under Portuguese rule
- Japanese dynastic feudal domains (日本の世襲藩(にほんのせしゅうはん)) (16th century–1871):
  - Shiroi Domain (白井藩(しろいはん)) (1590–1623) – Ruled by the Honda clan (本多), the Matsudaira clan (松平), the Ii clan (井伊), and the Nishio clan (西尾)
  - Naha Domain (那波藩(なわはん)) (1590–1662) – Ruled by the Matsudaira clan (松平) and the Sakai clan (酒井)
  - Obata Domain (小幡藩(おばたはん)) (1590–1868) – Ruled by the Okudaira clan (奥平), the Mizuno clan (水野), Nagai clan (永井), the Oda clan (織田), and the Matsudaira clan (松平)
  - Yoshii Domain (吉井藩(よしいはん)) (1590–1610, 1682–1698, 1709–1869) – Ruled by the Suganuma clan (菅沼), the Hotta clan (堀田), and the Matsudaira clan (松平)
  - Hirosaki Domain (弘前藩(ひろさきはん)) (1590–1871) – Ruled by the Tsugaru clan (津軽)
  - Takasaki Domain (高崎藩(たかさきはん)) (1590–1871) – Ruled by the Ii clan (井伊), the Sakai clan (酒井), the Matsudaira clan (松平), the Andō clan (安藤), and the Manabe clan (間部)
  - Tatebayashi Domain (館林藩(たてばやしはん)) (1590–1871) – Ruled by the Sakakibara clan (榊原), the Matsudaira clan (松平), the Tokugawa clan (徳川), the Ōta clan (太田), the Inoue clan (井上), and the Akimoto clan (秋元)
  - Sōja Domain (総社藩(そうじゃはん)) (1592–1633) – Ruled by the Suwa clan (諏訪) and the Akimoto clan (秋元)
  - Morioka Domain (盛岡藩(もりおかはん)) (1599–1870) – Ruled by the Nanbu clan (南部)
  - Owari Domain (尾張藩(おわりはん)) (1600–1871) – Ruled by the Owari Tokugawa family (徳川 (尾張))
  - Sendai Domain (仙台藩(せんだいはん)) (1600–1871) – Ruled by the Date clan (伊達)
  - Yamagata Domain (山形藩(やまがたはん)) (1600–1871) – Ruled by the Mogami clan (最上), the Torii clan (鳥居), the Hoshina clan (保科), the Matsudaira clan (松平), the Okudaira clan (奥平), the Hotta clan (堀田), the Akimoto clan (秋元), and the Mizuno clan (水野)
  - Aizu Domain (会津藩(あいづはん)) (1601–1869) – Ruled by the Gamō clan (蒲生), the Katō clan (加藤), the Hoshina clan (保科), and the Matsudaira clan (松平)
  - Yonezawa Domain (米沢藩(よねざわはん)) (1601–1871) – Ruled by the Uesugi clan (上杉)
  - Maebashi Domain (前橋藩(まえばしはん)) (1601–1871) – Ruled by the Sakai clan (酒井) and the Matsudaira clan (松平)
  - Isesaki Domain (伊勢崎藩(いせさきはん)) (1601–1871) – Ruled by the Inagaki clan (稲垣) and the Sakai clan (酒井)
  - Ueno Toyooka Domain (上野豊岡藩(こうづけとよおかはん)) (1602–1626) – Ruled by the Nezu clan (根津)
  - Kubota Domain (久保田藩(くぼたはん)) ( 1602–1871) – Ruled by the Satake clan (佐竹)
  - Sōma Nakamura Domain (相馬中村藩(そうまなかむらはん)) (1602–1871) – Ruled by the Sōma clan (相馬)
  - Iwakitaira Domain (磐城平藩(いわきたいらはん)) (1602–1871) – Ruled by the Torii clan (鳥居), the Naitō clan (内藤), the Inoue clan (井上), and the Andō clan (安藤)
  - Itabana Domain (板鼻藩(いたばなはん)) (1603–1636) – Ruled by the Satomi clan (里見) and the Sakai clan (酒井)
  - Tanagura Domain (棚倉藩(たなぐらはん)) (1603–1871) – Ruled by the Tachibana clan (立花), the Niwa clan (丹羽), the Naitō clan (内藤), the Ōta clan (太田), the Matsudaira clan (松平), the Ogasawara clan (小笠原), the Inoue clan (井上), and the Abe clan (安倍)
  - Ōgo Domain (大胡藩(おおごはん)) (1604–1616) – Ruled by the Makino clan (牧野)
  - Matsumae Domain (松前藩(まつまえはん)) (1604–1871) – Ruled by the Matsumae clan (松前)
  - Aoyagi Domain (青柳藩(あおやぎはん)) ( 1614–1619) – Ruled by the Kondō clan (近藤)
  - Annaka Domain (安中藩(あんなかはん)) (1615–1871) – Ruled by the Ii clan (井伊), the Mizuno clan (水野), the Hotta clan (堀田), the Itakura clan (板倉), and the Naitō clan (内藤)
  - Nanokaichi Domain (七日市藩(なのかいちはん)) (1616–1871) – Ruled by the Maeda clan (前田)
  - Aterazawa Domain (左沢藩(あてらざわはん)) (1622–1648) – Ruled by the Sakai clan (酒井)
  - Kubota Domain (窪田藩(くぼたはん)) (1622–1684) – Ruled by the Hijikata clanm (土方)
  - Shōnai Domain (庄内藩(しょうないはん)) (1622–1871) – Ruled by the Sakai clan (酒井)
  - Shinjō Domain (新庄藩(しんじょうはん)) (1622–1871) – Ruled by the Tozawa clan (戸沢)
  - Kaminoyama Domain (上山藩(かみのやまはん)) (1622–1871) – Ruled by the Matsudaira clan (松平), the Gamō clan (蒲生), the Toki clan (土岐), and the Kanamori clan (金森)
  - Nikaho Domain (仁賀保藩(にかほはん)) (1623–1626) – Ruled by the Nikaho clan (仁賀保)
  - Honjō Domain (本荘藩(ほんじょうはん)) (1623–1868) – Ruled by the Rokugō clan (六郷)
  - Kameda Domain (亀田藩(かめだはん)) (1623–1871) – Ruled by the Iwaki clan (岩城)
  - Shirakawa Domain (白河藩(しらかわはん)) (1627–1868) – Ruled by the Niwa clan (丹羽), the Sakakibara clan (榊原), the Honda clan (本多), the Matsudaira clan (松平), and the Abe clan (阿部)
  - Miharu Domain (三春藩(みはるはん)) (1627–1871) – Ruled by the Katō clan (加藤), the Matsushita clan (松下), and the Akita clan (秋田)
  - Nihonmatsu Domain (二本松藩(にほんまつはん)) (1627–1871) – Ruled by the Matsushita clan (松下), the Katō clan (加藤), and the Niwa clan (丹羽)
  - Dewamaruoka Domain (出羽丸岡藩(でわまるおかはん)) (1632–1653) – Ruled by the Katō clan (加藤)
  - Izumi Domain (泉藩(いずみはん)) (1634–1871) – Ruled by the Naitō clan (内藤), the Itakura clan (板倉), and the Honda clan (本多)
  - Yashima Domain (矢島藩(やしまはん)) (1640–1658, 1868–1871) – Ruled by the Ikoma clan (生駒)
  - Ōyama Domain (大山藩(おおやまはん)) (1647–1668) – Ruled by the Sakai clan (酒井)
  - Dewa-Matsuyama Domain (出羽松山藩(でわまつやまはん)) (1647–1871) – Ruled by the Sakai clan (酒井)
  - Numata Domain (沼田藩(ぬまたはん)) (1656–1871) – Ruled by the Sanada clan (真田), the Honda clan (本多), the Kuroda clan (黒田), and the Toki clan (土岐)
  - Iwanuma Domain (岩沼藩(いわぬまはん)) (1660–1681) – Ruled by the Tamura clan (田村)
  - Ichinoseki Domain (一関藩(いちのせきはん)) (1660–1671, 1681–1871) – Ruled by the Date clan (伊達) and the Tamura clan (田村)
  - Asakawa Domain (浅川藩(あさかわはん)) (1662–1681) – Ruled by the Honda clan (本多)
  - Ishikawa Domain (石川藩(いしかわはん)) (1662–1681) – Ruled by the Honda clan (本多)
  - Hachinohe Domain (八戸藩(はちのへはん)) (1664–1871) – Ruled by the Nanbu clan (南部)
  - Yunagaya Domain (湯長谷藩(ゆながやはん)) (1670–1871) – Ruled by the of Tōyama clan (遠山) and the Naitō clan (内藤)
  - Fukushima Domain (福島藩(ふくしまはん)) (1679–1871) – Ruled by the Honda clan (本多), the Hotta clan (堀田), and the Itakura clan (板倉)
  - Ōkubo Domain (大久保藩(おおくぼはん)) (1682–1693) – Ruled by the Honda clan (本多)
  - Murayama Domain (村山藩(むらやまはん)) (1682–1699) – Ruled by the Honda clan (本多)
  - Yanagawa Domain (梁川藩(やながわはん)) (1683–1728, 1807–1821) – Ruled by the Matsudaira clan (松平) and the Matsumae clan (松前)
  - Koori Domain (桑折藩(こおりはん)) (1688–1767) – Ruled by the Matsudaira clan (松平)
  - Nakatsuyama Domain (中津山藩(なかつやまはん)) (1695–1868) – Ruled by the Date clan (伊達)
  - Moriyama Domain (守山藩(もりやまはん)) (1700–1871) – Ruled by the Matsudaira clan (松平)
  - Kubota Shinden Domain (久保田新田藩(くぼたしんでんはん)) (1701–1732) – Ruled by the Satake clan (佐竹)
  - Iwasaki Domain (岩崎藩(いわさきはん)) (1701–1871) – Ruled by the Satake clan (佐竹)
  - Yonezawa Shinden Domain (米沢新田藩(よねざわしんでんはん)) (1719–1869) – Ruled by the Uesugi clan (上杉)
  - Shinozuka Domain (篠塚藩(しのづかはん)) (1747–1748) – Ruled by the Matsudaira clan (松平)
  - Kamisatomi Domain (上里見藩(かみさとみはん)) (1748–1767) – Ruled by the Matsudaira clan (松平)
  - Takabatake Domain (高畠藩(たかはたはん)) (1767–1830) – Ruled by the Oda clan (織田)
  - Mutsu Shimomura Domain (陸奥下村藩(むつしもむらはん)) (1787–1823) – Ruled by the Tanuma clan (田沼)
  - Nagatoro Domain (長瀞藩(ながとろはん)) (1798–1871) – Ruled by the Yonekitsu clan (米津)
  - Shimotedo Domain (下手渡藩(しもてどはん)) (1806–1868) – Ruled by the Tachibana clan (立花)
  - Kuroishi Domain (黒石藩(くろいしはん)) (1809–1871) – Ruled by the Tsugaru clan (津軽)
  - Shichinohe Domain (七戸藩(しちのへはん)) (1819–1871) – Ruled by the Nanbu clan (南部)
  - Tendō Domain (天童藩(てんどうはん)) (1830–1871) – Ruled by the Oda clan (織田)
  - Tonami Domain (斗南藩(となみはん)) (1870–1871) – Ruled by the Matsudaira clan (松平)

=== Jordan ===
- Ghassulian
- Levantine states
- Kingdom of Ammon
- Kingdom of Moab
- Kingdom of Edom
- Nabataeans
- Tanukhids (196–1100)
- Ghassanids (220–638)
- Salihids (4th century–6th century)
- Jarrahids
- **House of Fayez** (1610–present) – Bani Sakher (Non-sovereign)
- **House of Hashim** (1921–present) – Emirate of Transjordan and Hashemite Kingdom of Jordan

=== Korea ===
- Gojoseon (고조선 / 古朝鮮) (2333–108 BC) –
  - Dangun Joseon (단군조선 / 檀君朝鮮) (2333–1120 BC) –
  - Gija Joseon (기자조선 / 箕子朝鮮) (1120–194 BC) – Founded by Jizi from the Chinese Shang dynasty
  - Wiman Joseon (위만조선 / 衛滿朝鮮) (194–108 BC) – Founded by Wei Man from the Chinese State of Yan
- Takri Kingdom (고리국 / 槀離國) (c. 5th century–2nd century BC)
- Jin (진 / 辰) (c. 4th century–2nd century BC)
- Dongye (동예 / 東濊) (c. 3rd century BC–AD 5th century)
- Buyeo (부여 / 扶餘) (239 BC–AD 494)
  - Northern Buyeo (북부여 / 北扶餘) (239–58 BC)
    - Jolbon Buyeo (졸본부여 / 卒本扶餘) (86–37 BC)
    - Eastern Buyeo (동부여 / 東扶餘) (86 BC–AD 22)
      - Galsa Buyeo (갈사부여 / 曷思扶餘) (AD 22–494)
- Okjeo (옥저 / 沃沮) (c. 2nd century BC–AD 5th century)
  - Eastern Okjeo (동옥저 / 東沃沮) – Also called "Southern Okjeo" (남옥저 / 南沃沮)
  - Northern Okjeo (북옥저 / 北沃沮)
- Nakrang Kingdom (낙랑국 / 樂浪國) (c. 1st century BC–AD 37)
- Samhan (삼한 / 三韓) (c. 1st century BC–AD 5th century)
  - Jinhan (진한 / 辰韓) (c. 1st century BC–AD 4th century)
  - Mahan (마한 / 馬韓) (c. 1st century BC–AD 5th century)
  - Byeonhan (변한 / 弁韓) (c. 1st century–4th century AD)
- Three Kingdoms (삼국 / 三國) (57 BC–AD 668)
  - Silla (신라 / 新羅) (57 BC–AD 935) – Ruled by the House of Park (박 / 朴), the House of Seok (석 / 昔), and the House of Kim (김 / 金)
  - Goguryeo (고구려 / 高句麗) (37 BC–AD 668) – Ruled by the House of Go (고 / 高)
  - Baekje (백제 / 百濟) (18 BC–AD 660) – Ruled by the House of Buyeo (부여 / 扶餘); Also called "Southern Buyeo" (남부여 / 南扶餘)
- Tamna (탐라 / 耽羅) (57 BC–AD 1402)
- Xin dynasty (신나라 / 新朝) (AD 9–23) – Interrupted the Han dynasty; Ruled by the House of Wang (왕 / 王); Chinese rule over the Four Commanderies of Han on the Korean Peninsula
- Gaya (가야 / 伽倻) (AD 42–562)
  - Daegaya (대가야 / 大伽倻) (AD 42–562)
  - Geumgwan Gaya (금관가야 / 金官伽倻) (AD 43–532)
  - Bihwa Gaya (비화가야 / 非火伽倻) (?–AD 555)
  - Ara Gaya (아라가야 / 阿羅伽倻) (?–AD 559)
  - Goryeong Gaya (고령가야 / 古寧伽倻) (?–AD 562)
  - Sogaya (소가야 / 小伽倻)
  - Seongsan Gaya (성산가야 / 星山伽倻)
- Bodeog (보덕국 / 報德國) (AD 674–683) – Ruled by the House of Go (고 / 高)
- Northern and Southern States (남북국 / 南北國) (AD 698–892)
  - Later Silla (후신라 / 後新羅) (AD 668–935) – Ruled by the House of Kim (김 / 金); Also called "Unified Silla" (통일신라 / 統一新羅)
  - Balhae (발해 / 渤海) (AD 698–926) – Ruled by the House of Dae (대 / 大)
- Jang-an (장안 / 長安) (AD 822–825) – Ruled by the House of Kim (김 / 金)
- Later Three Kingdoms (후삼국 / 後三國) (AD 892–936)
  - Later Silla (후신라 / 後新羅) (AD 668–935) – Ruled by the House of Kim (김 / 金); Also called "Unified Silla" (통일신라 / 統一新羅)
  - Later Baekje (후백제 / 後百濟) (AD 892–936) – Ruled by the House of Gyeon (견 / 甄)
  - Taebong (태봉 / 泰封) (AD 901–918) – Ruled by the House of Kim (김 / 金); Also called "Later Goguryeo" (후고구려 / 後高句麗)
- Goryeo (고려 / 高麗) (AD 918–1392) – Ruled by the House of Wang (왕 / 王)
- Later Sabeol (후사벌 / 後沙伐) (AD 919–927) – Ruled by the House of Park (박 / 朴)
- Usan (우산국 / 于山國) (?–AD 1022)
- Daewi (대위국 / 大為國) (AD 1135–1136)
- Joseon (조선 / 朝鮮) (AD 1392–1897) – Ruled by the House of Yi (이 / 李)
  - Korean Empire (대한제국 / 大韓帝國) (AD 1897–1910)
- Daegeum (대금 / 大金) (AD 1453) – Ruled by the House of Yi (이 / 李)

=== Kuwait ===
- Dilmun
- Bani Khalid
- Al Jalahma
- **House of Sabah** (1718–present)

=== Laos ===
- Khun Lo dynasty (AD 1353–1438, AD 1442–1583, AD 1591–1778, AD 1780–1791, AD 1811–1858, AD 1946–1975)
  - House of Champassak (ນະ ຈຳປາສັກ) (AD 1863–1946)
- Later Lê dynasty (AD 1478–1480)
- Kingdom of Luang Phrabang (ພຣະຣາຊອານາຈັກຫລວງພະບາງ) (AD 1707–1945)

=== Lebanon ===
- Eshmunazar dynasty (c. 575–479 BC)
- Baalshillem dynasty (c. 450–333 BC)
- House of Toulouse – County of Tripoli
- House of Poitiers – County of Tripoli
- House of Flanders – Kingdom of Jerusalem
- House of Rethel – Kingdom of Jerusalem
- House of Châteaudun – Kingdom of Jerusalem
- Aleramici – Kingdom of Jerusalem
- Hohenstaufen – Kingdom of Jerusalem
- House of Poitiers-Lusignan – Kingdom of Jerusalem
- Ma'n dynasty (12th century–1697) – Mount Lebanon Emirate
- Buhturids (12th century–15th century)
- Assaf dynasty (1306–1591)
- Harfush dynasty (15th century–1865)
- Shihab dynasty (1697–1842) – Mount Lebanon Emirate
- Al-As'ad Dynasty (1630–1982) – Jabal Amel Emirate

=== Malaysia ===
- Gangga Negara (c. AD 2nd century–1026) – Legendary
- Langkasuka (c. AD 2nd century–15th century)
- **Kedah Sultanate** (Kesultanan Kedah) (AD 1136–1941, AD 1945–1946, AD 1948–present) – Ruling house of Kedah (Non-sovereign)
- Malacca Sultanate (Kesultanan Melayu Melaka) (AD 1400–1511)
- Inland dynasty (AD 1457–1688) – Pattani Kingdom
- Malacca-Johor dynasty (AD 1528–1699) – Johor Sultanate
- **House of Waris Jakun** (AD 1540–1555, AD 1605–1620, AD 1645–1660, AD 1750–1790, AD 1795–1812, AD 1819–1838, AD 1871–1883, AD 1905–1922, AD 1938–1962, AD 1998–present) – Undang of Rembau in Negeri Sembilan (Non-sovereign)
- House of Waris Jawa (AD 1555–1605, AD 1620–1645, AD 1660–1750, AD 1790–1795, AD 1812–1819, AD 1838–1871, AD 1883–1905, AD 1922–1938, AD 1962–1998) – Undang of Rembau in Negeri Sembilan (Non-sovereign)
- **Siak dynasty** (AD 1636–present) – Ruling house of Perak (Non-sovereign)
- First Kelantanese dynasty (AD 1688–1808) – Pattani Kingdom
- **Bendahara dynasty** (AD 1699–present) – Johor Sultanate (AD 1699–1855), Pahang Kingdom (AD 1770–1881), and ruling house of Pahang and Terengganu (AD 1699–present) (Non-sovereign)
  - **House of Temenggong** (AD 1886–present) – Provides the current Yang di-Pertuan Agong of Malaysia; Ruling house of Johor
- **House of Perut Johol** (AD 1723–1900, AD 1918–1947, AD 1873–1985, AD 1988–2007, AD 2016–present) – Undang of Johol in Negeri Sembilan (Non-sovereign)
- **House of Opu Daeng Chelak** (AD 1745–present) – Ruling house of Selangor (Non-sovereign)
- House of Waris Ulu Jelebu (AD 1757–?, AD 1820–?, AD 1883–1902, AD 1966–1979) – Undang of Jelebu in Negeri Sembilan (Non-sovereign)
- **House of Long Yunus** (AD 1765–present) – Ruling house of Kelantan (Non-sovereign)
- **Pagaruyung dynasty** (AD 1773–present) – Ruling house of Negeri Sembilan (Non-sovereign); Also called "House of Yamtuan Raden"
- House of Palembang (AD 1780–1899) – Kingdom of Besut Darul Iman
- House of Waris Sarin (AD 18th century–19th century, AD 1902–1945, AD 1980–2014) – Undang of Jelebu in Negeri Sembilan (Non-sovereign)
- **House of Klana** (AD 18th century–present) – Undang of Sungai Ujong in Negeri Sembilan (Non-sovereign)
  - **House of Waris Hulu** (AD 18th century–?, AD 1760–1800, AD 1824–1873, AD 1889–1945, AD 1993–present) – Undang of Sungai Ujong in Negeri Sembilan (Non-sovereign)
  - House of Walis Hilir (AD 18th century–?, AD 1800–1824, AD 1873–1889, AD 1945–1993) – Undang of Sungai Ujong in Negeri Sembilan (Non-sovereign)
- White Rajahs (Raja Putih Sarawak) (AD 1841–1946) – Raj of Sarawak; Also called "Brooke dynasty"
- Second Kelantanese dynasty (AD 1842–1902) – Pattani Kingdom
- **House of Jamalullail** (AD 1843–present) – Ruling house of Perlis (Non-sovereign)
- **House of Waris Kemin** (AD 19th century–1820, ?–AD 1883, AD 1945–1962, AD 2018–present) – Undang of Jelebu in Negeri Sembilan (Non-sovereign)

=== Maldives ===
- Solar dynasty
- Early Lunar dynasty
- Theemuge dynasty (AD 1117–1388) – Also called "Lunar dynasty"
- Hilaalee dynasty (AD 1388–1552, AD 1554–1573, AD 1573–1632)
- Utheemu dynasty (AD 1632–1692)
- Hamawi dynasty (AD 1692)
- Isdhoo dynasty (AD 1692–1704)
- Dhiyamigili dynasty (AD 1704–1759, AD 1766–1773)
- Huraa dynasty (AD 1759–1766, AD 1773–1952, AD 1954–1968)

=== Mesopotamia ===
- Dynasty I of Kish (c. 2900–2600 BC) – Legendary
- First Mariote Kingdom (2900–2550 BC)
- Dynasty I of Uruk – Legendary
- Dynasty I of Ur (c. 2500–2400 BC)
- Dynasty II of Kish – Legendary
- Second Mariote Kingdom (2500–2290 BC)
- Dynasty I of Lagash (2500–2271 BC)
- Dynasty of Hamazi
- Dynasty II of Uruk
- Dynasty II of Ur
- Dynasty of Adab
- Dynasty of Mari
- Dynasty III of Kish
- Dynasty of Akshak
- Dynasty IV of Kish (c. 24th century–2296 BC)
- Awan dynasty (2350–2150 BC)
- Akkadian Empire (2334–2154 BC)
- Dynasty III of Uruk (2296–2271 BC)
- Shakkanakku dynasty (2266–1830 BC)
- Shimashki dynasty (2200–1900 BC)
- Gutian dynasty (2199–2119 BC)
- Dynasty III of Ur (2112–2004 BC)
- Dynasty II of Lagash (2093–2046 BC)
- Dynasty IV of Uruk (c. 2091 BC–?)
- Dynasty V of Uruk (c. 2055–2048 BC)
- Puzur-Ashur dynasty (2025–1809 BC)
- Shamshi-Adad dynasty (1808–1736 BC)
- Dynasty of Larsa (1961–1674 BC)
- Dynasty of Isin (1953–1717 BC)
- Sukkalmah dynasty (1900–1500 BC)
- Lim dynasty (1830–1796 BC, 1776–1761 BC)
- Dynasty I of Babylon (1830–1531 BC)
- Yamhad dynasty (1810–1344 BC)
- Sealand dynasty (1732–1460 BC) – Also called "Dynasty II of Babylon"
- Adaside dynasty (1700–745 BC) – Old Assyrian Empire (1700–1378 BC), Middle Assyrian Empire (1392–934 BC), and Neo-Assyrian Empire (911–745 BC)
- Kassite dynasty (1600–1155 BC) – Also called "Dynasty III of Babylon"
- Dynasty IV of Babylon (1155–1025 BC) – Also called "Dynasty II of Isin"
- Dynasty V of Babylon (1025–1004 BC) – Also called "Second Sealand dynasty"
- Dynasty VI of Babylon (1004–985 BC) – Also called "Bῑt-Bazi dynasty"
- Dynasty VII of Babylon (985–979 BC) – Also called "Elamite dynasty"
- Dynasty VIII of Babylon (979–943 BC)
- Dynasty IX of Babylon (943–729 BC) – Also called "Dynasty of E"
- House of Suhi (10th century–848 BC) – Kingdom of Carchemish
- House of Astiruwa (848–717 BC) – Kingdom of Carchemish
- Dynasty X of Babylon (729–620 BC)
- Sargonid dynasty (722–609 BC) – Neo-Assyrian Empire
  - Pre-Sargonid dynasty (745–722 BC) – Neo-Assyrian Empire
- Median Kingdom (678–549 BC)
- Chaldean dynasty (626–539 BC) – Neo-Babylonian Empire
- Achaemenid dynasty (539–330 BC)
- Seleucid dynasty (321–141 BC, 138–64 BC)
- Hasmonean dynasty (140–37 BC)
- Abgarid dynasty (134 BC–AD 242)
- Kingdom of Osroene (132 BC–AD 216)
- Emesene dynasty (46 BC–AD 161)
- Tanukhids (AD 196–1100)
- House of Odaenathus (AD 270–273) – Palmyrene Empire
- Lakhmids (AD 300–602)
- Salihids (AD 4th century–6th century)
- Umayyad dynasty (AD 661–750) – Umayyad Caliphate
- Abbasid dynasty (AD 750–1258) – Abbasid Caliphate
  - Bahdinan (AD 1376–1843)
- Mazyadid dynasty (AD 861–14th century)
- Hamdanid dynasty (AD 895–1002)
- Sallarid dynasty (AD 919–1062)
- Buyid dynasty (AD 934–1062)
- Banu Mazyad (AD 961–1160)
- Marwanids (AD 983–1085)
- Numayrid dynasty (AD 990–1081)
- Uqaylid dynasty (AD 990–1096)
- Annazids (AD 990–1116)
- Hadhabani (AD 10th century–11th century)
- Mirdasid dynasty (AD 1024–1080)
- Anushtegin dynasty (AD 1077–1221) – Khwarazmian Empire
- Rubenids (AD 1080–1226) – Armenian Kingdom of Cilicia
- Artuqid dynasty (AD 1101–1409)
- Burid dynasty (AD 1104–1154)
- Al Fadl (AD 1107–1538) – Traditional leaders of the Bedouin tribes (Non-sovereign)
- Zengid dynasty (AD 1127–1250)
- Eldiguzids (AD 1135–1225)
- Ayyubid dynasty (AD 1171–1221)
- Hethumids (AD 1226–1341) – Armenian Kingdom of Cilicia
- Emirate of Kilis (AD 13th century–1264)
- Sutayids (AD 1312–1351)
- Jalairid Sultanate (AD 1335–1432)
- House of Poitiers-Lusignan (AD 1342–1375) – Armenian Kingdom of Cilicia
- Qara Qoyunlu (AD 1374–1468)
- Aq Qoyunlu (AD 1378–1501)
- Harfush dynasty (AD 15th century–19th century)
- Emirate of Bradost (AD 1510–1609)
- Soran Emirate (AD 16th century–19th century)
  - Baban (AD 1649–1850)
- Mamluk dynasty (AD 1704–1831)
- Jalili dynasty (AD 1726–1834)
- House of Hashim (AD 1920, AD 1932–1958) – Arab Kingdom of Syria (AD 1920) and Kingdom of Iraq (AD 1932–1958)

=== Mongolia ===
- Luandi (209 BC–AD 93) – Xiongnu confederation (209 BC–AD 48) and Northern Xiongnu (AD 48–93)
- Xianbei state (c. AD 93–234)
- Rouran Khaganate (AD 330–555)
- Ashina tribe (AD 552–630, AD 682–744) – First Turkic Khaganate (AD 552–581), Eastern Turkic Khaganate (AD 581–630), and Second Turkic Khaganate (AD 682–744)
- Xueyantuo (AD 628–646)
- Tang dynasty (Тан улс) (AD 647–682) – Chinese rule over the Mongolian Plateau under the Protectorate General to Pacify the North
- Türgesh Khaganate (Түргэш) (AD 699–766)
- Uyghur Khaganate (AD 744–840)
- Yenisei Kyrgyz Khaganate (AD 840–1207)
  - Western Liao (Баруун Ляо) (AD 1124–1218)
- Khamag Mongol (Хамаг Монголын ханлиг) (AD 10th century–1206)
- Keraite state (Хэрэйд) (AD 11th century–13th century)
- Naiman state (Найман) (?–AD 1206)
- Mongol Empire (Их Монгол улс) (AD 1206–1368)
  - Yuan dynasty (Юань улс) (AD 1271–1368) – Mongolia ruled as part of the Lingbei Province of the Yuan dynasty
    - Northern Yuan (Умард Юань) (AD 1368–1635)
      - Altan Khanate (AD 1609–1691)
      - Tüsheet Khanate (AD 1691–1923)
      - Setsen Khanate (AD 1691–1923)
      - Jasaghtu Khanate (AD 1691–1923)
- Alliance of the Four Oirats (Дөрвөн Ойрд) (AD 1399–1634)
- Bogd Khanate of Mongolia (Олноо өргөгдсөн Монгол улс) (AD 1911–1919, AD 1921–1924) – Limited international recognition

=== Myanmar (Burma) ===
- Pyu dynasty (c. 3000 BC–AD 400)
- First Tagaung dynasty (c. 850 BC–?) – Legendary
- Second Tagaung dynasty (c. 600 BC–?) – Legendary
- Thaton Kingdom (သုဝဏ္ဏဘူမိ) (4th century BC–AD 1057)
- Kingdom of Pong (AD 1st century–1479)
- Sarekhitara dynasty (c. AD 400–1044)
- Early Pagan Kingdom (ခေတ်ဦး ပုဂံ ပြည်) (c. AD 650–1044)
- Pagan Kingdom (ပုဂံခေတ်) (AD 1044–1287, AD 1289–1297)
- Hanthawaddy kingdom (ဟံသာဝတီ နေပြည်တော်) (AD 1287–1539, AD 1550–1552)
- Myinsaing Kingdom (မြင်စိုင်းခေတ်) (AD 1297–1313)
- Pinya Kingdom (ပင်းယခေတ်) (AD 1313–1365)
- Sagaing Kingdom (စစ်ကိုင်း နေပြည်တော်) (AD 1315–1365)
- Kingdom of Ava (အင်းဝခေတ်) (AD 1364–1555)
- Innwa dynasty (AD 1365–1486)
- Kingdom of Mrauk-U (AD 1429–1785)
- Prome Kingdom (ဒုတိယ သရေခေတ္တရာ နေပြည်တော်) (AD 1482–1542)
- Toungoo dynasty (တောင်ငူမင်းဆက်) (AD 1510–1752) – First Toungoo Empire
  - Nyaungyan dynasty (AD 1599–1752) – Restored Taungoo Kingdom
- Restored Hanthawaddy Kingdom (ဟံသာဝတီ နေပြည်တော်) (AD 1740–1757)
- Konbaung dynasty (ကုန်းဘောင်ခေတ်) (AD 1752–1885)
- Wikyama dynasty (?–?) – Sri Ksetra Kingdom
- Warman dynasty (?–?) – Sri Ksetra Kingdom

=== Nepal ===
- Kirat dynasty
- Licchavi (लिच्छवि) (c. AD 400–750)
- Tibetan Empire (AD 618–842)
- Simroun dynasty (AD 1097–1324)
- Khasa-Malla Kingdom (खस मल्ल राज्य) (AD 11th century–14th century)
- Malla dynasty (AD 1201–1779)
- Kingdom of Mustang (AD 1380–2008)
- Shah dynasty (शाह वंश) (AD 1559–2008)
- Rana Dynasty

(राणा वंश) (AD 1857–1951)

=== Oman ===
- Nabhani dynasty (AD 1154–1624)
- Ya'rubid dynasty (AD 1624–1749)
- Wajihids
- **House of Busaid** (AD 1749–present)

=== The Philippines ===
- Malay dynasties
  - The Datu Puti Lineage (Ruled the defunct Confederation of Madya-as) (13th century – 1565)
- Hindu dynasties
  - The Lakandula Dynasty (Ruled the defunct Kingdom of Tondo) (1150–1589)
  - The House of Tupas (Ruled the defunct Rajahnate of Cebu) (up to 1565)
  - The House of Sri Bata Shaja (Ruled the defunct Rajahnate of Butuan) (989–1586)
- Muslim dynasties
  - The Ud-Din Royal Hashemite Family (A dynasty which ruled the Maguinadanao Sultanate) (1480–1830)
  - Maynila (1500–1571)
  - **The Kiram Royal Hashemite Family** (Rules the Sulu Sultanate) (1823 – present)
  - The Sultan Diagaborola Balindong Bsar Lineage (Ruled the Lanao Confederation of sultanates in Lanao)

=== Qatar ===
- Al Bin Ali
- Bani Khalid
- House of Khalifa
- **House of Thani** (1850–present)

=== Ryukyu Islands ===
- Tenson dynasty (天孫氏(てんそんし)) (?–AD 1185) – Legendary
- Shunten dynasty (舜天王統(しゅんてんおうとう)) (AD 1187–1259)
- Eiso dynasty (英祖王統(えいそおうとう)) (AD 1260–1349)
- Sanzan period (三山時代(さんざんじだい)) (AD 1314–1429)
  - Haniji dynasty (怕尼芝王統(はねじ おうとう)) (AD 1314–1419) – Hokuzan
  - Satto dynasty (察度王統(さっとおうとう)) (AD 1314–1429) – Chūzan
  - Ōzato dynasty (大里王統(おおさとおうとう)) (AD 1314–1429) – Nanzan
- First Shō dynasty (第一尚氏(だいいちしょうし)) (AD 1406–1469)
- Second Shō dynasty (第二尚氏(だいにしょうし)) (AD 1469–1879)
- **Imperial House of Japan** (皇室(こうしつ)) (AD 1879–1945, AD 1972–present) – Ryukyu Islands under Japanese rule

=== Saudi Arabia ===
- Lakhmids (AD 300–602)
- House of Ali (867–1061, 1063–1925)
  - Banu Ukhaidhir (867–11th century)
  - Musawid dynasty (967–1061) – Sharifate of Mecca
  - Sulaymanids (1063–1174) – Sharifate of Mecca
  - Hawashim dynasty (1063–1201) – Sharifate of Mecca
  - Banu Qatadah (1201–1925) – Sharifate of Mecca
    - House of Hashim (1916–1925) – Kingdom of Hejaz
- Uyunid dynasty (1076–1253)
- Usfurids (1253–1320)
- Jabrids (1417–1524)
- Bani Khalid Emirate (1669–1796)
- **House of Saud** (1744–1818, 1824–1891, 1902–present) – Emirate of Diriyah, Emirate of Nejd, Emirate of Nejd and Hasa, Sultanate of Nejd, Kingdom of Hejaz and Nejd, Kingdom of Saudi Arabia
- Rashidi dynasty (1836–1921) – Emirate of Jabal Shammar
- Idrisid Emirate of Asir (1909–1930)

=== Siberia ===
- Luandi (209 BC–AD 93) – Xiongnu confederation (209 BC–AD 48) and Northern Xiongnu (AD 48–93)
- Xianbei state (c. AD 93–234)
- Rouran Khaganate (AD 330–555)
- Ashina tribe (AD 552–657, AD 682–744) – First Turkic Khaganate (AD 552–581), Eastern Turkic Khaganate (AD 581–630), Western Turkic Khaganate (AD 581–657), and Second Turkic Khaganate (AD 682–744)
- Ajo clan (AD 840–1207) – Yenisei Kyrgyz Khaganate
- Khamag Mongol (AD 10th century–1206)
- Khanty principalities (AD 14th century–17th century)
  - Principality of Obdorsk (AD 14th century–1609)
  - Principality of Kod (AD 15th century–1643)
  - Principality of Bardakovo (?–?)
  - Principality of Belogorye (?–?)
  - Principality of Kazym (?–?)
- Mansi principalities (?–?)
  - Principality of Pelym (?–?)
  - Principality of Vogul (?–?)
- Shaybanid dynasty (AD 1428–1598) – Khanate of Sibir
  - House of Siberia – Descendants of the Siberian throne

=== Sri Lanka ===
- Sinhala Kingdom (543 BC–AD 1597)
  - House of Vijaya (543–237 BC, 215–205 BC, 161–103 BC, 89 BC–AD 66) – Also called the "Vijayan dynasty"
  - House of Lambakanna I (AD 66–436)
  - House of Moriya (AD 463–691)
  - House of Lambakanna II (AD 691–1055) – Also called "House of Manavanna"
  - House of Vijayabahu (AD 1055–1187, AD 1197–1200, AD 1209–1210, AD 1211–1212)
  - House of Kalinga (AD 1187–1197, AD 1200–1209)
  - House of Siri Sanga Bo (AD 1220–1597)
- Jaffna Kingdom (AD 1232–1619)
  - Savakan Lotus Dynasty (AD 1255–1277)
  - Aryacakravarti dynasty (AD 1262–1450, AD 1467–1619)
  - House of Siri Sanga Bo (AD 1450–1467)
- Kingdom of Kandy (AD 1469–1815)
  - House of Siri Sanga Bo (AD 1469–1590)
  - Kandyan dynasty (AD 1590–1739)
  - Nayaks of Kandy (AD 1739–1815)
- Kingdom of Sitawaka (AD 1521–1594)
  - House of Siri Sanga Bo (AD 1521–1594)
- House of Windsor (AD 1948–1972) – Ceylon as a Commonwealth realm (AD 1948–1972)

=== Thailand (Siam) ===
- Singhanavati (สิงหนวัติ)
- Lavachakkaraj dynasty (AD 638–1292) – Kingdom of Hiran
- Phra Ruang dynasty (ราชวงศ์พระร่วง) (AD 1238–1438) – Sukhothai Kingdom
- Mangrai dynasty (AD 1292–1558) – Lan Na
- Uthong dynasty (ราชวงศ์อู่ทอง) (AD 1350–1370, AD 1388–1409) – Ayutthaya Kingdom
- Suphannaphum dynasty (ราชวงศ์สุพรรณภูมิ) (AD 1370–1388, AD 1409–1569) – Ayutthaya Kingdom
- Inland dynasty (AD 1457–1688) – Pattani Kingdom
- Sukhothai dynasty (ราชวงศ์สุโขทัย) (AD 1569–1629) – Ayutthaya Kingdom
- Sultanate of Singora (รัฐสุลต่านซิงกอรา) (AD 1605–1680)
- Prasart Thong dynasty (ราชวงศ์ปราสาททอง) (AD 1629–1688) – Ayutthaya Kingdom
- Baan Plu Luang dynasty (ราชวงศ์บ้านพลูหลวง) (AD 1688–1767) – Ayutthaya Kingdom
- First Kelantanese dynasty (AD 1688–1808) – Pattani Kingdom
- Chet Ton dynasty (เชื้อเจ็ดตน) (AD 1732–1943) – Also called "Thipchak dynasty" (ราชวงศ์ทิพย์จักร)
- Thonburi Kingdom (ราชวงศ์ธนบุรี) (AD 1767–1782)
- **Chakri dynasty** (ราชวงศ์จักรี) (AD 1782–present) – Rattanakosin Kingdom (AD 1782–1932) and Kingdom of Thailand (AD 1932–present)
- Second Kelantanese dynasty (AD 1842–1902) – Pattani Kingdom

=== United Arab Emirates ===
- **House of Qasimi** (1708–present) – Ruling house of Ras Al Khaimah and Sharjah (Non-sovereign)
- **House of Nahyan** (1761–present) – Provides the current President of the United Arab Emirates; Ruling house of Abu Dhabi
- **House of Mualla** (1768–present) – Ruling house of Umm Al Quwain (Non-sovereign)
- **House of Nuaimi** (1816–present) – Ruling house of Ajman (Non-sovereign)
- **House of Maktoum** (1833–present) – Ruling house of Dubai (Non-sovereign)
- **House of Sharqi** (1879–present) – Ruling house of Fujairah (Non-sovereign)

=== Vietnam ===
- Hồng Bàng dynasty (Hồng Bàng thị / 鴻龐氏) (2879–258 BC)
  - Càn line (Chi Càn / 支乾) (2879–2794 BC)
  - Khảm line (Chi Khảm / 支坎) (2793–2525 BC)
  - Cấn line (Chi Cấn / 支艮) (2524–2253 BC)
  - Chấn line (Chi Chấn / 支震) (2252–1913 BC)
  - Tốn line (Chi Tốn / 支巽) (1912–1713 BC)
  - Ly line (Chi Ly / 支離) (1712–1632 BC)
  - Khôn line (Chi Khôn / 支坤) (1631–1432 BC)
  - Đoài line (Chi Đoài / 支兌) (1431–1332 BC)
  - Giáp line (Chi Giáp / 支甲) (1331–1252 BC)
  - Ất line (Chi Ất / 支乙) (1251–1162 BC)
  - Bính line (Chi Bính / 支丙) (1161–1055 BC)
  - Đinh line (Chi Đinh / 支丁) (1054–969 BC)
  - Mậu line (Chi Mậu / 支戊) (968–854 BC)
  - Kỷ line (Chi Kỷ / 支己) (853–755 BC)
  - Canh line (Chi Canh / 支庚) (754–661 BC)
  - Tân line (Chi Tân / 支辛) (660–569 BC)
  - Nhâm line (Chi Nhâm / 支壬) (568–409 BC)
  - Qúy line (Chi Qúy / 支癸) (408–258 BC)
- Thục dynasty (Nhà Thục / 茹蜀) (257–207 BC)
- Triệu dynasty (Nhà Triệu / 茹趙) (204–111 BC) – Founded by Zhao Tuo from the Chinese Qin dynasty; Vietnam ruled as part of Nanyue
- Trưng sisters (Hai Bà Trưng / 𠄩婆徵) (AD 40–43) – Interrupted the Han dynasty
- Early Lý dynasty (Nhà Tiền Lý / 茹前李) (AD 544–602)
- Khúc clan (Họ Khúc / 𣱆曲) (AD 905–930)
- Ngô dynasty (Nhà Ngô / 茹吳) (AD 939–965)
- Đinh dynasty (Nhà Đinh / 茹丁) (AD 968–980)
- Early Lê dynasty (Nhà Tiền Lê / 茹前黎) (AD 980–1009)
- Lý dynasty (Nhà Lý / 茹李) (AD 1009–1225)
- Trần dynasty (Nhà Trần / 茹陳) (AD 1225–1400)
  - Later Trần dynasty (Nhà Hậu Trần / 茹後陳) (AD 1407–1413)
- Hồ dynasty (Nhà Hồ / 茹胡) (AD 1400–1407)
- Later Lê dynasty (Nhà Hậu Lê / 茹後黎) (AD 1428–1527, AD 1533–1789)
  - Primitive Lê dynasty (Nhà Lê sơ / 茹黎初) (AD 1428–1527)
  - Revival Lê dynasty (Nhà Lê trung hưng / 茹黎中興) (AD 1533–1789)
- Mạc dynasty (Nhà Mạc / 茹莫) (AD 1527–1677)
- Bầu lords (Chúa Bầu / 主裒) (AD 1527–1689)
- Trịnh lords (Chúa Trịnh / 主鄭) (AD 1545–1787)
- Nguyễn lords (Chúa Nguyễn / 主阮) (AD 1558–1777)
- Principality of Hà Tiên (Hà Tiên trấn / 河僊鎮) (AD 1707–1832) – Founded by Mo Jiu from the Chinese Southern Ming dynasty
- Tây Sơn dynasty (Nhà Tây Sơn / 茹西山) (AD 1778–1802)
- Nguyễn dynasty (Nhà Nguyễn / 茹阮) (AD 1802–1945) – Nguyễn monarch legally maintained the nominal title of "emperor" in the Domain of the Crown from 1950 to 1955
- House of Sedang (Nhà Xơ Đăng) (AD 1888–1890)
- Tai Federation Royal House (before 17th century–1954)

=== Yemen ===
- Kingdom of Saba' (c. 1200 BC–AD 275)
- Hadramaut
- Kingdom of Awsan (800–500 BC)
- Kingdom of Ma'in (8th century–100 BC)
- Minaeans
- Kingdom of Ḥaḑramawt (8th century BC–AD 300)
- Kingdom of Qatabān (4th century BC–AD 200)
- Himyarite Kingdom (110 BC–AD 525)
- Ziyadid dynasty (AD 818–1018)
- Yu'firids (AD 847–997)
- Rassids (AD 897–1596, AD 1918–1970)
  - Qasimids (AD 1597–1849) – Yemeni Zaidi State
- Najahid dynasty (AD 1022–1158)
- Sulayhid dynasty (AD 1047–1138)
- Sulaymanids (AD 1063–1174)
- Zurayids (AD 1083–1174)
- Yemeni Hamdanids (AD 1099–1174)
  - First Hatimid line (AD 1099–1116)
  - Banu‘l-Qubaib line (AD 1116–1139)
  - Second Hatimid line (AD 1139–1174)
- Mahdids (AD 1159–1174)
- Ayyubid dynasty (AD 1174–1229)
- Rasulid dynasty (AD 1229–1454)
- Kathiri State of Seiyun in Hadhramaut (AD 14th century–1967)
- Tahirid dynasty (AD 1454–1517)
- Emirate of Dhala (AD 15th century–1967)
- Fadhli Sultanate (AD 15th century–1967)
- Wahidi Sultanate of Balhaf in Hadhramaut (AD 1640–1967)
- Wahidi Sultanate of Habban (AD 1640–1967)
- Emirate of Beihan (AD 1680–1967)
- Yemeni Zaidi State
- Sultanate of Lahej (AD 1728–1967)
- `Alawi Sheikhdom (AD 1743–1967)
- Mawsata (AD 1780–1967)
- Mutawakkilite Kingdom of Yemen
- Sultanate of Lower Yafa (AD 1800–1967)
- Upper Yafa (AD 1800–1967)
- Hadrami Sheikhdom (AD 1820–1967)
- Wahidi Sultanate of Bir ‘Ali (AD 1830–1967)
- Muflihi Sheikdom (AD 1850–1967)
- Qu'aiti State in Hadhramaut (AD 1858–1967)
- Mahra Sultanate of Qishn and Socotra (AD 1886–1967)
- `Aqrabi Sheikhdom (AD 18th century–1967)
- Dathina Sheikhdom (AD 18th century–1967)
- `Awdhali Sultanate (AD 18th century–1967)
- Bu`si Sheikdom (AD 18th century–1967)
- Hawshabi Sultanate of Musaymir (AD 18th century–1967)
- Lower Aulaqi Sultanate (AD 18th century–1967)
- Sheikhdom of Shaib (AD 18th century–1967)
- Upper Aulaqi Sheikhdom (AD 18th century–1967)
- Upper Aulaqi Sultanate (AD 18th century–1967)
- Dhubi Sheikhdom (AD 18th century–1967)
- Qutaibi Sheikhdom

== List of dynasties in Europe ==
Legend
Extant sovereign dynasties
Extant non-sovereign dynasties

=== Al-Andalus ===
- Umayyad dynasty (AD 711–750, AD 756–1017, AD 1023–1031) – Umayyad Caliphate, Emirate of Córdoba and Caliphate of Córdoba
- Banu Salama (AD 780–800)
- Banu Shabrit (AD 8th century–10th century)
- Banu Khalaf (AD 802–882)
- Banu Qasi (AD 9th century–10th century)
- Banu Sabur (AD 1009–1022) – Taifa of Badajoz
- Qasimid dynasty (AD 1009–1106) – Taifa of Alpuente
- Ya'isid dynasty (AD 1010–?, ?–AD 1031) – Taifa of Toledo
- Masarrid dynasty – Taifa of Toledo
- Banu Qantir – Taifa of Toledo
- Saqlabi dynasty (AD 1010–1060) – Taifa of Valencia and Taifa of Tortosa
- Dammarid dynasty (AD 1010–1066) – Taifa of Morón
- Amirid dynasty (AD 1010–1086, AD 1224–1227) – Taifa of Dénia and Taifa of Valencia
- Jizrunid dynasty (AD 1011–1069) – Taifa of Arcos
- Bakrid dynasty (AD 1012–1051) – Taifa of Saltés and Huelva
- Banu Razin (AD 1012–1104) – Taifa of Albarracín
- Birzalid dynasty (AD 1013–1067) – Taifa of Carmona
- Zirid dynasty (AD 1013–1090) – Taifa of Granada and Taifa of Málaga
- Banu Tujib (AD 1013–1094) – Taifa of Zaragoza and Taifa of Badajoz
  - Banu Sumadih (AD 1041–1091) – Taifa of Almería
- Hammudid dynasty (AD 1016–1023, AD 1026–1058) – Caliphate of Córdoba, Taifa of Ceuta, Taifa of Algeciras, and Taifa of Málaga
- Harunid dynasty (AD 1018–1051) – Taifa of Santa Maria do Algarve
- Mujahid dynasty (AD 1018–1075) – Taifa of Majorca
- Matiyid dynasty (AD 1020–1028) – Taifa of Toledo
- Banu Sabur (AD 1022–1034) – Taifa of Lisbon
- Aftasid dynasty (AD 1022–1094)
- Yahsubid dynasty (AD 1023–1054) – Taifa of Niebla
- Abbadid dynasty (AD 1023–1091) – Taifa of Seville and Taifa of Mértola
- Muzaymid dynasty (AD 1027–1063) – Taifa of Silves
- Banu Jawhar (AD 1031–1091) – Taifa of Córdoba
- Dhulnunid dynasty (AD 1032–1080, AD 1081–1085, AD 1086–1092) – Taifa of Toledo and Taifa of Valencia
- Yafranid dynasty (AD 1039–1065) – Taifa of Ronda
- Banu Hud (AD 1039–1131, AD 1145, AD 1146) – Taifa of Zaragoza, Taifa of Tortosa, Taifa of Valencia, Taifa of Granada, and Taifa of Jaén
- Aglabid dynasty (AD 1076–1126) – Taifa of Majorca
- Lubbunid dynasty (AD 1086–1092) – Taifa of Murviedro and Sagunto
- Galbunid dynasty (AD 1080s–1100) – Taifa of Molina
- Almoravid dynasty (AD 1090–1145) – Taifa of Mértola, Taifa of Granada, and Taifa of Zaragoza
- Yahhafid dynasty (AD 1092–1094) – Taifa of Valencia
- Dynasty of El Cid (AD 1094–1102) – Taifa of Valencia
- Banu Hayy (AD 1116–1150) – Taifa of Badajoz
- Ghaniyid dynasty (AD 1126–1203) – Taifa of Majorca
- Banu Wazir (AD 1142–1145) – Taifa of Badajoz
- Idrisid dynasty (AD 1143–1145) – Taifa of Arcos
- Darddusid dynasty (AD 1143–1150) – Taifa of Carmona
- Marwanid dynasty (AD 1143–1150) – Taifa of Constantina and Hornachuelos
- Labidid dynasty (AD 1144–1145) – Taifa of Santarém
- Qasid dynasty (AD 1144–1145, AD 1146–1151) – Taifa of Mértola
- 'Abd al-'Aziz dynasty (AD 1145) – Taifa of Valencia
- Yuzaid dynasty (AD 1145) – Taifa of Jaén
- Taifa of Jerez (AD 1145)
- 'Jyaddid dynasty (AD 1145–1146, AD 1146–1147) – Taifa of Valencia
- al-Mundirid dynasty (AD 1145–1150) – Taifa of Silves
- Bitruyid dynasty (AD 1145–1150) – Taifa of Niebla and Taifa of Tejada
- Miqdamid dynasty (AD 1145–1150) – Taifa of Purchena
- Malyanid dynasty (AD 1145–1151) – Taifa of Guadix and Baza
- Hassunid dynasty (AD 1145–1153) – Taifa of Málaga
- 'Umarid dynasty (AD 1146–1150) – Taifa of Tavira
- Hamuskid dynasty (AD 1147–1150, AD 1168) – Taifa of Segura and Taifa of Jaén
- Bayasid dynasty (AD 1224–1226) – Taifa of Baeza
- Ahlid dynasty (AD 1228–1250) – Taifa of Lorca
- Hakamid dynasty (AD 1228–1287) – Taifa of Menorca
- Mardanis dynasty (AD 1229–1238) – Taifa of Valencia
- Zannunid dynasty (AD 1229–1239) – Taifa of Málaga
- Nasrid dynasty (AD 1230–1492) – Emirate of Granada and Taifa of Arjona
- Mahfuzid dynasty (AD 1234–1262) – Taifa of Niebla
- Taifa of Orihuela (AD 1239–1249)

=== Albania ===
- Progoni (AD 1190–1216) – Principality of Arbanon
- Sratsimir dynasty (AD 1346–1372) – Principality of Valona
- Balšić noble family (AD 1356–1421) – Zeta under the Balšići (AD 1356–1421), Principality of Valona (AD 1372–1417), and Principality of Albania (AD 1382–1385)
- Thopia family (AD 1358–1382, AD 1385–1392) – Principality of Albania
- Zenevisi family (AD 1386–1418) – Principality of Gjirokastër
- House of Kastrioti (AD 1389–1444) – Principality of Kastrioti
- Muzaka family (AD 1396–1417) – Lordship of Berat
- House of Wied-Neuwied (AD 1914–1925) – Principality of Albania
- House of Zogu (AD 1928–1939)
- House of Savoy (AD 1939–1943)

=== Anatolia (Asia Minor) ===
- Hittite Empire (c. 1600–1178 BC)
- Heraclid dynasty (12th century–687 BC)
- Adaside dynasty (911–745 BC) – Neo-Assyrian Empire
- House of Suhi (10th century–848 BC) – Kingdom of Carchemish
- House of Astiruwa (848–717 BC) – Kingdom of Carchemish
- Sargonid dynasty (722–609 BC) – Neo-Assyrian Empire
  - Pre-Sargonid dynasty (745–722 BC) – Neo-Assyrian Empire
- Mermnad dynasty (680–546 BC)
- Median dynasty (678–549 BC)
- Achaemenid dynasty (550–330 BC) – Achaemenid Empire
  - Mithridatic dynasty (281 BC–AD 62) – Kingdom of Pontus
- Pharnacid dynasty (480–320 BC)
- Hecatomnids (395–334 BC)
- Argead dynasty (334–305 BC) – Anatolia under Macedonian rule
- Ariarathid dynasty (331–96 BC) – Kingdom of Cappadocia
- Antigonid dynasty (306–286 BC, 276–168 BC) – Anatolia under Macedonian rule
- Antipatrid dynasty (305–294 BC, 279–276 BC) – Anatolia under Macedonian rule
- Attalid dynasty (282–129 BC) – Kingdom of Pergamon
- Arsacid dynasty (247 BC–AD 224) – Anatolia within the Parthian Empire
- Seleucid dynasty (200–188 BC) – Anatolia within the Seleucid Empire
- House of Ariobarzanes (96–36 BC) – Kingdom of Cappadocia
- House of Archelaus (36 BC–AD 17) – Kingdom of Cappadocia
- House of Odaenathus (AD 270–273) – Palmyrene Empire
- Constantinian dynasty (AD 330–363) – Anatolia under Byzantine rule
- Valentinianic dynasty (AD 364–379) – Anatolia under Byzantine rule
- Theodosian dynasty (AD 379–457) – Anatolia under Byzantine rule
- Leonid dynasty (AD 457–518) – Anatolia under Byzantine rule
- Justinian dynasty (AD 518–602) – Anatolia under Byzantine rule
- Heraclian dynasty (AD 610–711) – Anatolia under Byzantine rule
- Isurian dynasty (AD 717–802) – Anatolia under Byzantine rule
- Bohtan (AD 8th century–1847)
- Nikephorian dynasty (AD 802–813) – Anatolia under Byzantine rule
- Amorian dynasty (AD 820–867) – Anatolia under Byzantine rule
- Kaysite dynasty (AD 860–964)
- Macedonian dynasty (AD 867–1056) – Anatolia under Byzantine rule
- Sajid dynasty (AD 889–929)
- Seljuq dynasty (AD 1037–1308) – Seljuk Empire (AD 1037–1194) and Sultanate of Rum (AD 1077–1308)
- Principality of Eğil (AD 1049–1864)
- Doukid dynasty (AD 1059–1081) – Anatolia under Byzantine rule
- Danishmendid dynasty (AD 1071–1178)
- Saltukids (AD 1071–1202)
- House of Mengüjek (AD 1072–1277)
  - Erzincan branch (AD 1142–1228)
  - Divriği branch (AD 1142–1277)
- Rubenids (AD 1080–1226) – Armenian Kingdom of Cilicia
- Beylik of Smyrna (AD 1081–1098)
- Komnenos dynasty (AD 1081–1185) – Anatolia under Byzantine rule
- Beylik of Çubukoğulları (AD 1085–1112)
- Beylik of Dilmaç (AD 1085–1398)
- Inalids (AD 1095–1183)
- Hauteville family (AD 1098–1163) – Principality of Antioch
- Artuqid dynasty (AD 1101–1409)
  - Mardin branch (AD 1101–1409)
    - Aleppo subbranch (AD 1117–1128)
  - Hasankeyf branch (AD 1102–1233)
  - Harput branch (AD 1185–1234)
- Shah-Armens (AD 1110–1207)
- Zengid dynasty (AD 1128–1183)
- House of Poitiers (AD 1163–1268) – Principality of Antioch
- Principality of Bitlis (AD 1182–19th century)
- Angelos dynasty (AD 1185–1204) – Anatolia under Byzantine rule
- House of Flanders (AD 1204–1216) – Latin Empire
- Laskarid dynasty (AD 1204–1261) – Empire of Nicaea (Exiled court of the Byzantine Empire)
- Capetian House of Courtenay (AD 1216–1261) – Latin Empire
- Hethumids (AD 1226–1341) – Armenian Kingdom of Cilicia
- Chobanids (AD 1227–1309)
- Emirate of Bingöl (AD 1231–1864)
- Emirate of Hasankeyf (AD 1232–1524)
- Karamanid dynasty (AD 1250–1487)
- Ilkhanate (AD 1256–1353)
- Menteshe (AD 1261–1424)
- Palaiologos dynasty (AD 1261–1453) – Anatolia under Byzantine rule
- Beylik of Lâdik (AD 1262–1391)
- Sahib Ataids (AD 1275–1341)
- Pervâneoğlu (AD 1277–1322)
- Eshrefids (AD 1280–1326)
- Candar dynasty (AD 1292–1461)
- Alaiye (AD 1293–1471)
- Karasid dynasty (AD 1296–1357)
- Ottoman dynasty (AD 1299–1924) – Ottoman Empire (AD 1299–1922) and Ottoman Caliphate (AD 1517–1924)
  - Osmanoğlu family – Descendants of the Ottoman throne
- Emirate of Çemişgezek (AD 13th century–1663)
- Hamidid dynasty (AD 1300–1391)
  - Tekeoğulları dynasty (AD 1321–1423)
- Sarukhanid dynasty (AD 1300–1410)
- Germiyanids (AD 1300–1429)
- Tacettinoğulları dynasty (AD 1308–1425)
- Aydınid dynasty (AD 1308–1426)
- Sutayids (AD 1312–1351)
- Hacıemiroğulları dynasty (AD 1313–1392)
- Eretnids (AD 1335–1381)
- Principality of Zirqan (AD 1335–1835)
- Beylik of Dulkadir (AD 1337–1522)
- Kutluşah dynasty (AD 1340–1393)
- House of Poitiers-Lusignan (AD 1342–1448) – Armenian Kingdom of Cilicia (AD 1342–1375), and Antalya and Corycus within the Kingdom of Cyprus (AD 1361–1448)
- Qara Qoyunlu (AD 1374–1468)
- Bahdinan (AD 1376–1843)
- Aq Qoyunlu (AD 1378–1501)
- Beylik of Erzincan (AD 1379–1410)
- Emirate of Hakkâri (AD 14th century–1847)
- Principality of Mahmudi (AD 1406–1839)
- Emirate of Palu (AD 1495–1850)
- Emirate of Pazooka (AD 1499–1587)
- Principality of Suleyman (AD 15th century–1838)
- Maeoniae dynasty (?–?)

=== Armenia ===
- Orontid dynasty
  - Artaxiad dynasty or the Artashesi Dynasty (189 BC-12 AD)
- Arsacid dynasty of Armenia or the Arshakuni Dynasty (54–428)
- Siunia dynasty
  - House of Hasan-Jalalyan
- Bagratuni dynasty or the Bagratid Dynasty of Armenia (885–1045)
- Rubenid dynasty of the Armenian Kingdom of Cilicia (1080–1225)
- Zakarids–Mkhargrdzeli (1201–1360) – Zakarid Armenia
- House of Lusignan, the Armenian Kingdom of Cilicia (1342–1467)
- Kara Koyunlu (1374–1468)
- Javanshir clan (1748–1822) – Karabakh Khanate
- House of Holstein-Gottorp-Romanov (1828–1917) – Armenia under Russian rule

=== Ashkenazi Jews ===
- Karlin-Stolin (1772–present)
- Chabad Lubavitch (1775–present)
- Belz (1817–present)
- Skver (1837–present)
- Vizhnitz (1854–present)
- Ger (1859–present)
- Bobov (1881–present)
- Satmar (1905–present)
- Sanz-Klausenburg (1927–present)

=== Austria ===
- House of Babenberg (976–1246)
- House of Habsburg (1278–1780) – Also called "House of Austria"
  - Albertinian line (1379–1439, 1440–1457)
  - Leopoldian line (1379–1493)
  - House of Habsburg-Lorraine (1780–1918/19)

=== Barbarians ===
==== Bavarii ====
- Agilolfing dynasty

==== Burgundians ====
- House of the Kings of the Burgundians (4th century–534) – In Nibelung called the "Gjúkungar"

==== Franks ====
- Merovingian dynasty (481–751)
- Carolingian dynasty (751–843)
- Arnulfings or Pippinids, mayors of the palaces. Ancestors of the Carolingians.

==== Huns ====
- Attilid dynasty
- House of Dulo Bulgaria (390–503) A Nominalia of the Bulgarian khans genealogy claims that the Dulo clan is descended from Attila the Hun.

==== Lombards ====
- Lething dynasty (until early 6th century)
- Gausian dynasty (546–572)
- Arodingian dynasty (635–653)
- Bavarian dynasty (615–635, 653–712)

==== Ostrogoths ====
- Amal dynasty (before 474–536)

==== Suebi ====
- Suebic dynasty (409–585)

==== Vandals ====
- Hasdingi (before 407–534)

==== Visigoths ====
- Balt dynasty (395–531)

=== Belgium ===
Medieval feudal states: (Note: Including the County of Flanders, Marquisate of Namur, Duchy of Brabant, County of Hainaut, Duchy of Limburg and County of Luxembourg)

- House of Flanders (rulers of various entities in the Southern Netherlands and Crusader states 863–1280)
- House of Dampierre (rulers of various entities in the Southern Netherlands and France 1247–1405)
- House of Reginar (rulers of various entities in the Southern Netherlands c. 770–1406)
- House of Burgundy (1384–1482)

Kingdom of Belgium:

- House of Saxe-Coburg and Gotha (1831–1920)
  - **House of Belgium** (1920–present)

=== Bosnia ===
- House of Boričević (1154–1163)
- House of Kulinić (1163–1250)
- House of Kotromanić (1250–1463)
- House of Berislavić (1463–1527)

=== Bulgaria ===
- Odrysian Kingdom (480–30 BC)
- Dulo clan (AD 681–753, AD 768–997) – First Bulgarian Empire
  - Krum's dynasty (AD 803–997) – First Bulgarian Empire
- Vokil clan (AD 753–762, AD 766) – First Bulgarian Empire
- Ugain clan (AD 762–765) – First Bulgarian Empire
- Cometopuli dynasty (AD 997–1018) – First Bulgarian Empire
- Asen dynasty (AD 1185–1280) – Second Bulgarian Empire
  - Sratsimir dynasty (AD 1346–1417) – Principality of Valona (AD 1346–1417) and Tsardom of Vidin (AD 1356–1365, AD 1369–1396)
- Terter dynasty (AD 1280–1292, AD 1300–1322) – Second Bulgarian Empire
- Smilets dynasty (AD 1292–1299) – Second Bulgarian Empire
- Borjigin clan (AD 1299–1300) – Second Bulgarian Empire
- House of Shishman (AD 1323–1422) – Second Bulgarian Empire
- Ottoman dynasty (AD 1396–1878) – Bulgaria under Ottoman rule
- Battenberg family (AD 1878–1886) – Principality of Bulgaria
- House of Saxe-Coburg and Gotha (AD 1887–1946) – Principality of Bulgaria (AD 1887–1908) and Kingdom of Bulgaria (AD 1908–1946)

=== Croatia ===
- Trpimirović dynasty (c. AD 845–864, AD 878–879, AD 892–1091) – Duchy of Croatia (AD 845–864, AD 878–879, AD 892–925) and Kingdom of Croatia (AD 925–1091)
- Domagojević dynasty (AD 864–878, AD 879–892) – Duchy of Croatia
- Snačić family (AD 1093–1097)
- House of Savoy-Aosta (AD 1941–1943) – Independent State of Croatia

=== Czech Republic ===
Great Moravia:

- Moymirid dynasty (c.830–906?)

Kingdom of Bohemia:

- Přemyslid dynasty (c. 870–1198, 1085–1092, 1158–1172, 1198–1306; heredity of the royal title established in 1212)
- House of Gorizia (1306, 1307–1310)
- House of Habsburg (1306–1307, 1437–1439, 1453–1457, 1526–1780)
- House of Luxembourg (1310–1437; Lands of the Bohemian Crown established in 1348)
- House of Poděbrady (1457–1471)
- House of Jagiellon (1471–1526)

=== Denmark ===
- Scylding (pre AD 8th century) – Legendary
- House of Olaf (c. AD 9th century–10th century) – Semi-legendary
- House of Knýtlinga (AD 916–1042) – Also called "House of Denmark" and "Jelling dynasty"
  - House of Estridsen (AD 1047–1332, AD 1340–1375, AD 1376–1412)
    - Sunnivasson descendant (AD 1137–1146)
- Fairhair dynasty (AD 1042–1047) – Denmark within the Norwegian Realm
- House of Bjälbo (AD 1376–1387)
- House of Griffin (AD 1396–1439)
- House of Palatinate-Neumarkt (AD (1439)1440–1448)
- House of Oldenburg (AD 1448–1533, AD 1534–1863)
  - **House of Schleswig-Holstein-Sonderburg-Glücksburg** (AD 1863–present)

=== England ===
- Wuffingas (AD 6th century–749) – Kingdom of East Anglia
- House of Wessex (AD 519–645, AD 648–1013, AD 1014–1016, AD 1042–1066)
- Iclingas (AD 527–606, AD 626–656, AD 658–796) – Kingdom of Mercia
  - C dynasty of Mercia (AD 796–823, AD 840)
- East Anglian dynasty (AD 749–794, AD 796–800, AD 927–869) – Kingdom of East Anglia
- B dynasty of Mercia (AD 757, AD 823–826, AD 840–874) – Kingdom of Mercia
- W dynasty of Mercia (AD 827–829, AD 830–840) – Kingdom of Mercia
- House of Knýtlinga (AD 1013–1014, AD 1016–1042) – Also called "House of Denmark" and "Jelling dynasty"
- House of Godwin (AD 1066)
- House of Normandy (AD 1066–1135)
- House of Blois (AD 1135–1154)
- Angevins (AD 1154–1216)
  - House of Plantagenet (AD 1216–1399)
    - House of Lancaster (AD 1399–1461, AD 1470–1471)
    - House of York (AD 1461–1470, AD 1471–1485)
- House of Capet (AD 1216–1217) – Disputed claim to the English throne
- House of Tudor (AD 1485–1603)
- House of Stuart (AD 1603–1649, AD 1660–1714) – Kingdom of England (AD 1603–1649, AD 1660–1707) and England within the Kingdom of Great Britain (AD 1707–1714)
- House of Hanover (AD 1714–1901) – England within the Kingdom of Great Britain (AD 1714–1800) and England within the United Kingdom of Great Britain and Ireland (AD 1801–1901)
- House of Saxe-Coburg and Gotha (AD 1901–1917) – England within the United Kingdom of Great Britain and Ireland
  - **House of Windsor** (AD 1917–present) – England within the United Kingdom of Great Britain and Ireland (AD 1917–1922) and England within the United Kingdom of Great Britain and Northern Ireland (AD 1922–present)

=== Estonia ===
- Lembitu (AD 1211–1217) – County of Sakala
- The Four Kings (AD 1343) – Duchy of Estonia during Saint George's Night Uprising
- Vesse (AD 1344) – Kingdom of Saaremaa during Saint George's Night Uprising

=== Finland ===
- House of Hesse-Kassel (AD 1720–1751, AD 1918) – Finland under Swedish rule (AD 1720–1751) and Kingdom of Finland (AD 1918)

=== France ===
- Gallic Empire (Empire des Gaules) (AD 260–274) – Breakaway state during the Crisis of the Third Century
- Kingdom of Soissons (Royaume de Soissons) (AD 457–486) – Rump state of the Western Roman Empire
- Merovingian dynasty (Mérovingiens) (AD 509–751)
- Carolingian dynasty (Carolingiens) (AD 751–888, AD 898–922, AD 936–987)
- House of Poitiers (Maison de Poitiers) (AD 854–1204)
- Robertian dynasty (Robertiens) (AD 888–898, AD 922–923)
- Bosonids (Bosonides) (AD 923–936)
- Capetian dynasty (Capétiens) (AD 987–1792, AD 1793–1795, AD 1814–1848)
  - House of Capet (Maison capétienne) (AD 987–1328) – Also called "House of France" (Maison de France) and "Direct Capetians" (Capétiens directs)
  - House of Valois (Maison capétienne de Valois) (AD 1328–1589)
    - House of Valois-Orléans (Le rameau d'Orléans) (AD 1498–1515)
    - House of Valois-Angoulême (Le rameau d'Orléans-Angoulême) (AD 1515–1589)
  - House of Bourbon (Maison de Bourbon) (AD 1589–1792, AD 1793–1795, AD 1814–1848)
    - House of Bourbon-Vendôme (Maison de Bourbon-Vendôme) (AD 1589–1792, AD 1814–1815, AD 1815–1830)
    - House of Orléans (Maison d'Orléans) (AD 1830–1848) – Also called "House of Bourbon-Orléans" (Maison de Bourbon-Orléans)
- House of Bonaparte (Maison Bonaparte) (AD 1804–1814, AD 1815, AD 1852–1870)

Corsica:

- House of Neuhoff (Kingdom of Corsica) (AD March – November 1736)

=== Germany ===
- Carolingian dynasty (Karolinger) (AD 843–911)
- Conradines (Konradiner) (AD 911–918)
- Ottonian dynasty (Liudolfinger) (AD 919–921, AD 936–1024)
- Salian dynasty (Salier) (AD 1024–1125) – Also called "Frankish dynasty"
- House of Württemberg (AD 1081–1918)
  - House of Urach (AD 1867–1918)
- Supplinburger dynasty (AD 1125–1137)
- Hohenstaufen (Staufer) (AD 1138–1208, AD 1212–1254)
- House of Wizlaw (AD 1168–1325) – Principality of Rügen
- House of Welf (Welfen) (AD 1198–1215)
- House of Thuringia (AD 1246–1247)
- House of Holland (AD 1247–1256)
- House of Plantagenet (Haus Plantagenet) (AD 1257–1272)
- House of Ivrea (Haus Burgund-Ivrea) (AD 1257–1275)
- House of Habsburg (Haus Habsburg) (AD 1273–1291, AD 1298–1308, AD 1325–1330, AD 1440–1740)
- House of Nassau (Haus Nassau) (AD 1292–1298)
- House of Luxembourg (Haus Luxemburg) (AD 1308–1313, AD 1346–1400, AD 1410–1437)
- House of Wittelsbach (Haus Wittelsbach) (AD 1314–1347, AD 1400–1410, AD 1742–1745)
- House of Schwarzburg (Schwarzburger) (AD 1349)
- House of Lorraine (Haus Lothringen) (AD 1745–1765)
  - House of Habsburg-Lorraine (Habsburg-Lothringen) (AD 1764–1806, AD 1815–1849, AD 1850–1866)
- Beauharnais (AD 1813)
- House of Hohenzollern (Haus Hohenzollern) (AD 1525–1918)

Bavaria:

- Agilolfings (Agilolfinger) (AD 548–788)
- Liutpolding Dynasty (Luitpoldinger) (AD 889–947)
- Ottonian Dynasty (Ottonen) (AD 947–1017)
- House of Luxembourg (AD 1017–1026, 1039–1047)
- Salian Dynasty (Salier) (AD 1026–1039, 1053–1061)
- House of Welf (Welfen) (AD 1070–1138, 1156–1180)
- House of Babenberg (AD 1138–1156)
- House of Wittelsbach (AD 1180–1918)

Saxony:

- Liudolfing Dynasty (843–961)
- Billung Dynasty (961–1106)
- Supplinburger Dynasty (1106–1127)
- House of Welf (1127–1138, 1142–1180)
- Ascanian Dynasty (1138–1142, 1180–1422)
- Wettin Dynasty (1422–1918)

=== Georgia ===
- Pharnavazid dynasty (299–90 BC, 30 BC – 189 AD)
- Artaxiad dynasty of Iberia (90–30 BC)
- Arsacid dynasty of Iberia (189–284 AD)
- Chosroid dynasty (284–580, 627–684)
  - Guaramid dynasty (588–627, 684–748, 779–786)
- Nersianid dynasty (748–780)
- Bagrationi dynasty (813–1810)
- Tsarazon dynasty (11th century–12th century) – Alania
- House of Dadiani (1183–1857)
- House of Jaqeli (1268–1625)
- House of Shervashidze (1463–1864)
- House of Mukhrani (1658–1724)
- House of Dadeshkeliani (1720–1857)

=== Greece ===
- Erechtheid dynasty (1556–1127 BC) – Athens
- Melanthid dynasty (1126–1068 BC) – Athens
- Agiad dynasty (930–215 BC) – Sparta
- Eurypontid dynasty (930–206 BC) – Sparta
- Argead dynasty (Ἀργεάδαι) (700–305 BC) – Macedonia
- Paeonia Kingdom (Παιονία) (?–511 BC)
- Antigonid dynasty (Ἀντιγονίδαι) (306–286 BC, 276–168 BC) – Macedonia
- Antipatrid dynasty (Ἀντιπατρίδαι) (305–294 BC, 279–276 BC) – Macedonia
- Mithridatic dynasty (281–37 BC) – Pontus
- Aeacid dynasty (Αἰακίδαι) (?–233 BC) – Epirus
- Emirate of Crete (AD 824–961)
- Komnenos Doukas dynasty (AD 1205–1318) – Despotate of Epirus
- Orsini dynasty (AD 1318–1337, AD 1356–1359) – Despotate of Epirus
- Nemanjić dynasty (AD 1347–1385) – Despotate of Epirus
- Losha family (AD 1359–1374) – Despotate of Arta
- Spata family (AD 1374–1416) – Despotate of Arta
- Buondelmonti dynasty (AD 1385–1411) – Despotate of Epirus
- Zaccaria dynasty (AD 1304–1329), (AD 1402–1432, 1453–1455) – Lordship of Chios, Principality of Achaea
- Tocco dynasty (AD 1411–1479) – Despotate of Epirus
- Giustiniani dynasty (AD 1346–1566) – Maona of Chios and Phocaea
- Crispo dynasty (AD 1383–1566) – Duchy of the Archipelago
- House of Wittelsbach (Οίκος του Βίττελσμπαχ) (AD 1832–1862) – Kingdom of Greece
- House of Schleswig-Holstein-Sonderburg-Glücksburg (Οίκος του Σλέσβιχ-Χόλσταϊν-Σόντερμπουργκ-Γκλύξμπουργκ) (AD 1863–1924, AD 1935–1973) – Kingdom of Greece

=== Hungary ===
- Hunnic Empire (370s–469)
- Levedia (750/830–850)
- Etelköz (850–895)
- Árpád Dynasty (c. 895 – 1301)
- Samuel Aba of Hungary Aba – Árpád Dynasty (1038–1044)
- Přemyslid Dynasty (1301–1305)
- Capetian Dynasty, House of Anjou (1308–1395)
- House of Luxemburg (1387–1437)
- Hunyadi family (1458–1490)
- Habsburg Dynasty (1437–1457, 1526–1918)
- Zápolya Dynasty (1526–1571)

=== Ireland ===
- Laigin (6th century BC–17th century)
- Mide (1st century–12th century)
- Dál Fiatach (1st century–13th century)
- Osraige (150–1541)
- Airgíalla (331–1585)
- Uí Maine (357–1611)
- Connachta (4th century)
- Ulaid (before 450–1177)
- Uí Chennselaig (5th century)
- Uí Néill (5th century)
- Dál Birn (5th century–7th century)
- Uí Fiachrach (5th century–17th century)
- Eóganachta (6th century–10th century)
- Uí Briúin (7th century–8th century)
- Bréifne (700–1256)
- O'Conor Don (Ó Conchubhair Donn) (967–1475)
- O'Brien (978–1542)
- Fitzpatrick (10th century)
- Dál gCais (10th century–16th century)
- MacCarthy (Mac Cárthaigh) (1045–1596)
- Cenél nEógain (Northern) (11th century–16th century)
- House of Plantagenet (1154–1485)
  - Angevin kings of England (1154–1215)
  - House of Lancaster (1399–1461, 1470–1471) (Throne merged with English)
- Burke (1193–1363)
- Cenél Conaill (Northern) (12th century–17th century)
- O'Donnell (Ó Domhnaill) (1200–1601)
- O'Neill (Ó Néill) (1232–1616)
- Clanricarde (1333–1544)

=== Italy ===
For the rulers of Rome see Roman Empire

- Amal dynasty (AD 493–553) – Ostrogothic Kingdom
- Lething dynasty (Letingi) (c. AD 5th century–546)
- Gausian dynasty (Gausi) (AD 546–572)
- Harodingian dynasty (Arodingi) (AD 636–653)
- Beneventan dynasty (AD 662–671)
- House of Boniface (AD 812–931)
- Anatolian dynasty (AD 839–866)
- House of Capua (AD 840–866, AD 871–1058)
- House of Spoleto (AD 866–871)
- Docibilan dynasty (AD 866–1032)
- House of Boso (AD 931–1001)
- Aleramici (AD 933–1305)
- House of Musco Comite (AD 958–1039, AD 1052–1073)
- House of Hucpold (AD 1004–1011)
- House of Canossa (Casa di Canossa) (AD 1027–1115)
- Salian dynasty (Dinastia salica) (AD 1027–1125)
- House of Salerno (AD 1038–1052)
- Süpplingenburg dynasty (AD 1125–1137)
- Hauteville family (Altavilla) (AD 1071–1198)
- Hohenstaufen (AD 1128–1266)
- Visconti of Pisa and Sardinia (Visconti di Pisa) (AD 1207–1308)
- House of Welf (Welfen) (AD 1208–1212)
- House of Este (Casa d'Este) (AD 1240–1796)
- Capetian dynasty (Capetingi) (AD 1266–1442, AD 1499–1512, AD 1515–1521, AD 1700–1713, AD 1731–1861)
  - Capetian House of Anjou (Angioini) (AD 1266–1390, AD 1399–1435)
  - House of Valois (Casa di Valois) (AD 1382–1434, AD 1435–1442, AD 1499–1512, AD 1515–1521)
    - House of Valois-Anjou (Casa di Valois-Angiò) (AD 1382–1434, AD 1435–1442)
    - House of Valois-Orléans (Dinastia Valois-Orléans) (AD 1499–1512)
    - House of Valois-Angoulême (Dinastia Valois-Angoulême) (AD 1515–1521)
  - House of Bourbon-Anjou (AD 1700–1713, AD 1734–1816)
    - House of Bourbon-Parma (Borbone di Parma) (AD 1731–1735, AD 1748–1807, AD 1847–1859)
    - House of Bourbon-Two Sicilies (Borbone delle Due Sicilie) (AD 1735–1861)
- House of Wittelsbach (Casato di Wittelsbach) (AD 1327–1347)
- House of Gonzaga (AD 1328–1708)
- Albizzi family (AD 1382–1434)
- Visconti of Milan (AD 1395–1447)
- House of Medici (AD 1434–1494, AD 1512–1737)
- House of Habsburg (Casa d'Asburgo) (AD 1437–1780)
  - House of Habsburg-Lorraine (Asburgo-Lorena) (AD 1737–1801, AD 1814–1860, AD 1780–1796)
- House of Montefeltro (AD 1443–1518)
- House of Sforza (Famiglia Sforza) (AD 1450–1499, AD 1513–1515, AD 1522–1535)
- House of Della Rovere (AD 1508–1623)
- House of Farnese (AD 1545–1731)
- House of Guise (Casa di Guisa) (AD 1647–1648)
- House of Bonaparte (AD 1805–1814)
- House of Murat (Casa Murat) (AD 1808–1815)
- House of Savoy (Casa Savoia) (AD 1713–1720, AD 1762–1799, AD 1831–1946)
  - House of Savoy-Carignano (AD 1831–1946)

Sicily:

- Deinomenids (BCE 485–BCE 465)
- Dionysii (BCE 405–BCE 344)
- Timoleon (BCE 345–BCE 337)
- Agathocles (BCE 317–BCE 289)
- Hieronids (BCE 275–BCE 214)
- Kalbids (948–1053)

=== Liechtenstein ===
- **House of Liechtenstein** (1608–present)

=== Lithuania ===
- Palemonids (AD 38–1285) – Mythical
- House of Mindaugas (AD 1236–1267, AD 1269–1285)
- Gediminids (AD 1285–1440)
  - Family of Gediminas (AD 1341–1440)
- House of Jagiellon (AD 1440–1572)

=== Luxembourg ===
- House of Luxembourg (AD 963–1136)
  - House of Luxembourg-Namur (AD 1136–1196, AD 1197–1226)
  - House of Luxembourg-Limburg (AD 1247–1425)
- Hohenstaufen (AD 1196–1197)
- House of Valois-Burgundy (AD 1443–1482)
- House of Habsburg (AD 1482–1700, AD 1713–1780)
  - House of Habsburg-Lorraine (AD 1740–1794)
- House of Bourbon (AD 1700–1712)
  - **House of Bourbon-Parma** (AD 1985–present)
    - **House of Nassau-Weilburg** (AD 1890–present)
      - **House of Luxembourg-Nassau** (AD 1890–present)
- House of Wittelsbach (AD 1712–1713)
- House of Orange-Nassau (AD 1815–1890)

=== Malta ===
- House of Windsor (AD 1964–1974) – Malta under Commonwealth realm rule

=== Monaco ===
- **House of Grimaldi** (Maison Grimaldi) (1297–present)

=== Montenegro ===
- Vojislavljević dynasty (AD 1018–1043, AD 1050–1186)
- Crnojević noble family (AD 1326–1362, AD 1431–1498)
- Balšić noble family (AD 1356–1421)
- **Petrović-Njegoš dynasty** (Петровић-Његош) (AD 1696–1918) – Limited symbolic roles officially recognized since AD 2011

=== Netherlands ===
- **House of Nassau** (Huis Nassau) (AD 1544–present)
  - **House of Orange-Nassau** (Huis Oranje-Nassau) (AD 1813–present)
- House of Bonaparte (AD 1806–1810) – Kingdom of Holland

=== Norway ===
- Fairhair dynasty (Hårfagreætta) (AD 872–970, AD 995–1000)
  - Saint Olaf dynasty (AD 1015–1028, AD 1035–1047)
  - Hardrada dynasty (Hardrådeætta) (AD 1046–1135, AD 1161–1184)
    - Gille dynasty (AD 1130–1162, AD 1204–1217)
  - House of Sverre (Sverreætten) (AD 1184–1204, AD 1217–1319)
- House of Knýtlinga (AD 961–995, AD 1000–1015, AD 1028–1035) – Also called "House of Denmark" and "Jelling dynasty"
  - House of Estridsen (AD 1380–1412)
- **House of Schleswig-Holstein-Sonderburg-Glücksburg** (AD 1905–present)

=== Poland ===
- Piast dynasty (9th century-1296 and 1306–1370)
- House of Sobiesław (1227–1262)
- Přemyslid dynasty (1291–1306)
- Capetian dynasty, House of Anjou (1370–1399)
- Jagiellonian dynasty (1386–1572 and 1575–1586)

Elective monarchy:

- House of Valois (1573–1574)
- House of Báthory (1576–1586)
- House of Vasa (1587–1668)
- House of Wiśniowiecki (1669–1673)
- House of Sobieski (1674–1696)
- Wettin Dynasty (1697–1706, 1709–1733 and 1736–1764)
- House of Leszczyński (1704–1709 and 1733–1736)
- House of Poniatowski (1764–1795)

=== Portugal ===
- House of Vímara Peres (868–1071)
- Portuguese House of Burgundy or Afonsine dynasty (1139–1383)
  - House of Aviz or Joannine dynasty (1385–1580)
    - Aviz (direct) (1385–1495)
    - Aviz-Beja (1495–1580)
    - Most Serene House of Braganza or Brigantine dynasty (1640–1910)
      - Braganza (direct) (1640–1853)
      - Braganza-Saxe-Coburg and Gotha (1853–1910)

=== Roman Empire ===
- Kings of Rome (753–509 BC)
- Julio–Claudian dynasty (27 BC–AD 68)
- Flavian dynasty (AD 69–96)
- Nerva–Antonine dynasty (AD 96–192)
  - Nerva–Trajan dynasty (AD 96–138)
  - Antonine dynasty (AD 138–192)
- Severan dynasty (AD 193–235)
- Gordian dynasty (AD 238–244)
- Decian dynasty (AD 249–253)
- Valerian dynasty (AD 253–268)
- House of Odaenathus (AD 270–273) – Ruled the Palmyrene Empire during the Crisis of the Third Century
- Caran dynasty (AD 282–285)
- Constantinian dynasty (AD 305–363) – Western Roman Empire and Byzantine Empire
- Valentinianic dynasty (AD 364–392) – Western Roman Empire (AD 364–392) and Byzantine Empire (AD 364–379)
- Theodosian dynasty (AD 379–457) – Western Roman Empire (AD 392–455) and Byzantine Empire (AD 379–457)
- Kingdom of Soissons (AD 457–486) – Rump state of the Western Roman Empire
- Leonid dynasty (AD 457–518) – Western Roman Empire (AD 474–480) and Byzantine Empire (AD 457–518)
- Justinian dynasty (AD 518–602) – Byzantine Empire
- Heraclian dynasty (AD 610–711) – Byzantine Empire
- Isaurian dynasty (AD 717–802) – Byzantine Empire
- Nikephorian dynasty (AD 802–813) – Byzantine Empire
- Amorian dynasty (AD 820–867) – Byzantine Empire
- Macedonian dynasty (AD 867–1056) – Byzantine Empire
- Doukid dynasty (AD 1059–1081) – Byzantine Empire
- Komnenos dynasty (AD 1081–1185) – Byzantine Empire
- Angelos dynasty (AD 1185–1204) – Byzantine Empire
- Laskarid dynasty (AD 1204–1261) – Empire of Nicaea (Exiled court of the Byzantine Empire)
- Palaiologos dynasty (AD 1261–1453) – Byzantine Empire

=== Romania ===
Moldavia:

- Hunnic Empire (370s–469)
- House of Dragoș (1345–1364)
- House of Bogdan-Mușat (1363–1574, 1579–1582, 1591–1595, 1611–1615, 1620–1623, 1666–1668)
- House of Drăculești (1574–1577, 1578–1579, 1582–1591, 1600, 1616–1619, 1623–1626, 1629–1630)
- Movilești (1595–1611, 1615–1616, 1626–1629, 1630–1631, 1633–1634)
- Ghica family (1658–1659, 1726–1733, 1735–1739, 1739–1741, 1747–1748, 1753–1756, 1757–1758, 1764–1767, 1774–1777, 1849–1853, 1854–1856)
- Cantacuzino family (1673, 1674–1675, 1684–1685, 1858–1859)
- House of Rossetti (1675–1678, 1788–1789, 1807)
- Cantemirești (1685–1693, 1695–1700, 1705–1707, 1710–1711)
- Racoviță (1703–1705, 1707–1709, 1715–1726, 1749–1753, 1756–1757)
- Mavrocordatos family (1709–1710, 1711–1715, 1733–1735, 1741–1747, 1748–1749, 1782–1786)
- Ypsilantis (1786–1788, 1799–1801, 1821)
- Soutzos family (1793–1795, 1801–1802, 1819–1821)
- Mourousis family (1777–1782, 1792, 1802, 1806–1807)
- House of Cuza (1859–1866)

Wallachia:

- House of Basarab (1290–1591, 1602–1610, 1611, 1654–1658)
- House of Bogdan-Mușat (1591–1593, 1616–1618, 1627–1632, 1664–1669)
- House of Drăculești (1593–1600, 1601–1602, 1611–1616, 1620–1623, 1623–1627)
- Movilești (1600–1601, 1602, 1616, 1618–1620)
- Ghica family (1659–1664, 1672–1673, 1733–1735, 1748–1753, 1758–1761, 1765–1769, 1818, 1822–1828, 1834–1842, 1856–1858)
- Cantacuzino family (1678–1688, 1714–1715, 1848)
- Cantemirești (17th century–18th century)
- Mavrocordatos family (1715–1730, 1731–1733, 1735–1741, 1744–1748, 1756–1758, 1761–1763)
- Racoviță (1730–1731, 1741–1744, 1753–1756, 1763–1765)
- House of Rossetti (1770–1771)
- Ypsilantis (1774–1782, 1796–1797, 1802–1806)
- Soutzos family (1783–1786, 1790–1793, 1801–1802, 1818–1821)
- Mourousis family (1793–1796, 1799–1801)
- House of Cuza (1859–1866)

After the Unification:

- House of Hohenzollern-Sigmaringen (1866–1947)

=== Russia ===
- Khazar Khaganate (Хазары) (AD 650–969)
- Volga Bulgaria (Волжская Булгария) (AD 7th century–1242)
- Rus' Khaganate (Русский каганат) (AD 8th century–9th century) – Hypothesized
- Kyi dynasty (AD 842–882)
- Rurik dynasty (Рю́риковичи) (AD 862–1598, AD 1605–1610)
  - House of Shuysky (Шуйские) (AD 1606–1610)
- Golden Horde (Золотая Орда) (AD 1242–1502) – Russia under Mongol rule
  - Mukhsha Ulus (Улус Мухша) (AD 13th century–15th century)
  - Temnikov Principality (Темниковское княжество) (AD 1388–1526) – Mordvin princes
  - Khanate of Kazan (Казанское ханство) (AD 1438–1552)
    - Qasim Khanate (Касимовское царство) (AD 1452–1681)
  - Great Horde (Большая Орда) (AD 1466–1502)
  - Astrakhan Khanate (Астраханское ханство) (AD 1466–1556)
- Great Perm (Пермь Великая) (AD 1324–1505)
- Qasim dynasty (AD 1575–1576)
- Godunov dynasty (Годуно́в) (AD 1598–1605)
- House of Romanov (Рома́новы) (AD 1613–1762, AD 1796–1917, AD 1922)
  - House of Holstein-Gottorp-Romanov (Ветвь Гольштейн-Готторп-Романовская) (AD 1762, AD 1796–1917, AD 1922)
- Kalmyk Khanate (Калмыцкое ханство) (AD 1630–1771)

=== Scotland ===
- House of Alpin (AD 843–1034)
- Uí Ímair (AD 9th century–10th century) – Kingdom of the Isles
- House of Dunkeld (AD 1034–1040, AD 1058–1286)
- House of Moray (AD 1040–1058)
- House of Sverre (AD 1286–1290)
- House of Balliol (AD 1292–1296, AD 1332–1336)
- Clan Bruce (AD 1306–1371)
- House of Stuart (AD 1371–1651, AD 1660–1714) – Kingdom of Scotland (AD 1371–1651, AD 1660–1707) and Scotland within the Kingdom of Great Britain (AD 1707–1714)
- House of Hanover (AD 1714–1901) – Scotland within the Kingdom of Great Britain (AD 1714–1800) and Scotland within the Kingdom of Great Britain and Ireland (AD 1801–1901)
- House of Saxe-Coburg and Gotha (AD 1901–1917) – Scotland within the Kingdom of Great Britain and Ireland
  - **House of Windsor** (AD 1917–present) – Scotland within the Kingdom of Great Britain and Ireland (AD 1917–1922) and Scotland within the United Kingdom of Great Britain and Northern Ireland (AD 1922–present)

=== Serbia ===
- Vlastimirović dynasty (610–960)
- Vojislavljević dynasty (1034–1186)
- Vukanović dynasty (1083–1166)
- Nemanjić dynasty (1166–1371)
- Lazarević dynasty (1371–1427)
- Branković dynasty (1427–1502)
- Karađorđević dynasty (1811–13, 1842–58 and 1903–41) – Kingdom of Serbia (1903–1918), Kingdom of Serbs, Croats and Slovenes (1918–1929) and Kingdom of Yugoslavia (1929–1941)
- Obrenović dynasty (1815–42 and 1858–1903)

=== Slovenia ===
- Counts of Celje (1341–1456) – County of Cilli

=== Spain ===
- Balt dynasty (AD 395–531) – Visigothic Kingdom
- Astur-Leonese dynasty (AD 718–1037) – Kingdom of Asturias
- House of Íñiguez (AD 824–905) – Kingdom of Navarre
- House of Barcelona (AD 878–1410) – County of Barcelona and Crown of Aragon
- Jiménez dynasty (AD 905–1234) – Kingdom of Navarre, Kingdom of León, Kingdom of Galicia, Kingdom of Aragon, and Kingdom of Castile
- Castilian House of Burgundy (AD 1111–1369) – Kingdom of León, Kingdom of Galicia, Kingdom of Castile, and Crown of Castile
- House of Blois (AD 1234–1284) – Kingdom of Navarre
- Capetian dynasty (AD 1284–1441) – Kingdom of Navarre
  - House of Capet (AD 1284–1349)
  - House of Évreux (AD 1328–1441)
- House of Trastámara (AD 1369–1555) – Kingdom of Navarre, Kingdom of León, and Crown of Aragon
- House of Foix (AD 1479–1517) – Kingdom of Navarre
- House of Albret (AD 1484–1513, AD 1513–1572) – Kingdom of Navarre
- House of Habsburg (AD 1504–1700, AD 1705–1714) – Kingdom of Navarre, Crown of Aragon and Crown of Castile
- House of Bourbon (AD 1572–1620, AD 1700–1868)
  - House of Bourbon-Vendôme (AD 1572–1620) – Kingdom of Navarre
  - **House of Bourbon-Anjou** (AD 1700–1833, AD 1874–1931, AD 1975–present)
- House of Bonaparte (AD 1808–1813)
- House of Savoy (AD 1870–1873)

=== Sweden ===
- House of Munsö (c. AD 970–1060)
- House of Stenkil (AD 1060–1126)
- House of Estridsen (AD 1126–1132, AD 1160–1161, AD 1388/1389–1412)
- House of Sverker (AD 1130–1156, AD 1161–1167, AD 1196–1208, AD 1216–1222)
- House of Eric (Erikska ätten) (AD 1156–1160, AD 1167–1196, AD 1208–1216, AD 1222–1250)
- House of Bjälbo (Bjälboätten) (AD 1250–1364)
- House of Mecklenburg (AD 1364–1389)
- House of Griffin (AD 1396–1439)
- House of Wittelsbach (Huset Wittelsbach) (AD 1441–1448, AD 1654–1720)
  - House of Palatinate-Neumarkt (AD 1441–1448)
  - House of Palatinate-Zweibrücken (AD 1654–1720)
- House of Bonde (AD 1448–1457, AD 1464–1465, AD 1467–1470)
- House of Oldenburg (AD 1457–1464, AD 1497–1501, AD 1520–1521/1523)
  - House of Holstein-Gottorp (AD 1751–1818)
- House of Vasa (AD 1523–1654)
- House of Hesse (AD 1720–1751)
- **House of Bernadotte** (AD 1818–present)

=== Ukraine ===
- Hunnic Empire (AD 370s–469)
- Dulo clan (Дуло) (AD 632–668) – Old Great Bulgaria
- Khazar Khaganate (Хозари) (c. AD 650–969)
- Rus' Khaganate (Руський Каганат) (AD 8th century–9th century) – Hypothesized
- Pecheneg Khanates (Печеніги) (AD 860–1091)
- Rurik dynasty (Рюриковичі) (AD 890–1323) – Kievan Rus' and Kingdom of Galicia–Volhynia
- Piast dynasty (П'ясти) (AD 1323–1340) – Kingdom of Galicia–Volhynia
- Gediminid dynasty (Гедиміновичі) (AD 1340–1349) – Kingdom of Galicia–Volhynia
- Giray dynasty (Ґіреї) (AD 1427–1783) – Crimean Khanate
- Khmelnytsky (AD 1648–1663, AD 1678–1681)
- Skoropadsky family (Скоропадські) (AD 1708–1722, AD 1918)

=== Wales ===
- House of Gwynedd (AD 450–1283)
  - House of Cunedda (AD 450–825)
  - House of Manaw (AD 825–878)
    - House of Aberffraw (AD 878–986, AD 1023–1039, AD 1081–1283)
    - House of Dinefwr (AD 986–999)
      - House of Mathrafal (AD 999–1005, AD 1063–1081)
- House of Blegywryd (AD 1005–1018)
- House of Rhuddlan (AD 1018–1023, AD 1039–1063)
- House of Tudor (AD 1535–1603) – Wales within the Kingdom of England
- House of Stuart (AD 1603–1649, AD 1660–1714) – Wales within the Kingdom of England (AD 1603–1649, AD 1660–1707) and Wales within the Kingdom of Great Britain (AD 1707–1714)
- House of Hanover (AD 1714–1901) – Wales within the Kingdom of Great Britain (AD 1714–1800) and Wales within the United Kingdom of Great Britain and Ireland (AD 1801–1901)
- House of Saxe-Coburg and Gotha (AD 1901–1917) – Wales within the United Kingdom of Great Britain and Ireland
  - **House of Windsor** (AD 1917–present) – Wales within the United Kingdom of Great Britain and Ireland (AD 1917–1922) and Wales within the United Kingdom of Great Britain and Northern Ireland (AD 1922–present)

== List of dynasties in North America ==
Legend
Extant sovereign dynasties
Extant non-sovereign dynasties

=== Costa Rica ===
- Cazicazgo and Kingdom of Talamanca (1576–1862, 1867–1910)
- Kingdom of Tariaca (?–1709)

=== Chiefdoms of Hispaniola (Dominican Republic) ===
(Note: All five historical pre-Columbian chiefdoms of Babeque/Bohio had territorial extents in what is today the Dominican Republic, while only two had so in what is today Haiti.)

- Chiefs of Marién (?–mid 16th century)
- Chiefs of Maguá (?–mid 16th century)
- Chiefs of Maguana (?–mid 16th century)
- Chiefs of Jaragua (?–mid 16th century)
- Chiefs of Higüey (?–mid 16th century)

=== El Salvador ===
- Cuzcatlan (1054–1528)

=== Haiti ===
- House of Dessalines (AD 1804–1806) – First Empire of Haiti
- Line of kings of Haiti (AD 1811–1820) – Kingdom of Haiti
- House of Soulouque (AD 1849–1859) – Second Empire of Haiti

=== Maya ===
- Kaanu'l Dynasty, Mexico (400-10th century)
- Chan Santa Cruz Maya free State of Quintana Roo, Mexico (1850–1893)
- Itza Elite Yucatan, Mexico (600–1697)
- Kan Ek' Nojpetén Itza kingship, Guatemala (700–1697)
- Yax Kuk Mo Dynasty, Honduras (426 AC–810)
- K'iche' Kingdom of Q'umarkaj, Guatemala (1225–1524)
- Palenque B'aak dynasty Chiapas, Mexico(967 BCE – 799 CE)
- Siyaj K'ak' dynasties Mexico, Guatemala and Honduras (378–869)

=== Mexico ===
- Altepetl of Tetzcoco (AD 1298–1564)
- Purépecha Empire (AD 1300–1530)
- Altepetl of Tenochtitlan (AD 1325–1525, AD 1538–1565)
- Altepetl of Tlatelolco (AD 1403–1579)
- House of Iturbide (AD 1822–1823) – First Mexican Empire
- House of Habsburg-Lorraine (AD 1864–1867) – Second Mexican Empire

=== Panama ===
- **House of Santana** (AD ?–present)

=== Trinidad and Tobago ===
- **Carib Queen line** (AD 1875–present)

=== Conterminous United States ===
- Powhatan Chiefs (?–1646)
- Sachem (?–1676)
- Iroquois Confederacy (1142–present)
- Hunkpapa Seven council fires (?–1872)
- **Wapasha dynasty** (AD 1718–present) – Mdewakanton sub-tribe of the Dakota people (Non-sovereign)

== List of dynasties in Oceania ==
=== Cocos (Keeling) Islands (Australia) ===
- Clunies-Ross family (Note: They were owners by grant without any royal title related to Cocos Islands.) (AD 1827–1978)

=== Easter Island (Chile) ===
- Miru dynasty (?–AD 1899) – Kingdom of Rapa Nui

=== Fiji ===
- Bau dynasty (AD 1871–1874) – Kingdom of Fiji
- House of Hanover (AD 1874–1901) – Fiji under British rule
- House of Saxe-Coburg and Gotha (AD 1901–1917) – Fiji under British rule
  - House of Windsor (AD 1917–1987) – Fiji under British rule (AD 1917–1970) and Fiji as a Commonwealth realm (AD 1970–1987)

=== French Polynesia (France) ===
==== Austral Islands ====
- Tamaeva dynasty (?–AD 1900) – Kingdom of Rimatara
- Teuruarii dynasty (?–AD 1900) – Kingdom of Rurutu

==== Bass Islands ====
- Line of monarchs of Rapa Iti (?–AD 1881)

==== Gambier Islands ====
- Line of monarchs of Mangareva (?–AD 1881)

==== Marquesas Islands ====
- De Thierry dynasty (AD 1835–1837) – Kingdom of Nuku Hiva

==== Society Islands ====
- House of Tapoa (AD 1778–1873) – Kingdom of Bora Bora
- Pōmare dynasty (AD 1788–1808, AD 1815–1895) – Kingdom of Tahiti (AD 1788–1808, AD 1815–1880) and Kingdom of Bora Bora (AD 1873–1895)
- House of Tamatoa (AD 1820–1884, AD 1888–1897) – Kingdom of Raiatea
- House of Teururai (AD 1852–1895) – Kingdom of Huahine (AD 1852–1895) and Kingdom of Raiatea (AD 1885–1888)

=== Hawaii (United States) ===
- Pili line (Hale o Pili) (?–AD 1695)
- House of Keawe (Hale o Keawe) (AD 1695–?)
  - House of Keōua Nui (Hale o Keōua Nui)
    - House of Kamehameha (Hale o Kamehameha) (c. AD 1795–1872)
    - House of Laʻanui (Hale o Laʻanui) – Descendants of the Hawaiian throne
  - House of Kalākaua (c. AD 1874–1893)
    - House of Kawānanakoa – Descendants of the Hawaiian throne

=== Kiribati ===
- Butaritari ruling family (AD mid to late 19th Century–1892) – on Butaritari and Makin Islands
- Kingdom of Abemama (AD mid to late 18th Century- c.1979) – Kingdom of Abemama

=== Marshall Islands ===
- Kabua dynasty (c. AD 1863–1910)

=== Micronesia ===
- Saudeleur dynasty (c. AD 1100–1628)
- Gagil dynasty (?–1947) – Yapese Empire

=== Nauru ===
- House of Emea (AD 1888–???) – After uniting the 12 tribes of Nauru

==== Cook Islands ====
- **Ariki families** (?–present) – Kingdom of Rarotonga

=== Samoan Islands ===
- Tui Manu'a Confederacy (?–?)

=== Tonga ===
- Tuʻi Tonga (c. AD 900–1865)
- Tuʻi Haʻatakalaua (c. AD 1470–1797)
- **House of Tupou** (AD 1845–present)

== List of dynasties in South America ==
=== Bolivia ===
- **Afro-Bolivian Royal House** (AD 1823–present)

=== Brazil ===
  - House of Braganza (Sereníssima Casa de Bragança) (AD 1640–1910) – Brazil under Portuguese rule (AD 1640–1815), Brazil within the United Kingdom of Portugal, Brazil and the Algarves (AD 1815–1822), and Empire of Brazil (AD 1822–1889)
    - House of Braganza-Saxe-Coburg and Gotha (AD 1853–1910)
    - House of Orléans-Braganza (Casa de Orléans e Bragança) – Claimants to the Brazilian throne since AD 1921
- Palmares (AD 1670–1695)
- Harden dynasty (AD 1893–1895) – Principality of Trinidad

=== Chile ===
- Tounes dynasty (AD 1860–1862) – kingdom of Araucania and Patagonia with the chiefdoms of Mapuche Nation

=== Peru ===
- Hurin dynasty (1197 – c. 1350), ruling dynasty of earlier Kingdom of Cusco
- Hanan dynasty (c. 1350–1533), ruling dynasty of later Kingdom of Cusco, Inca Empire and Neo-Inca State

=== Venezuela ===
- Welser family (Note: They were owners by grant without any royal title related to Klein-Venedig.) (1528–1546) – Klein-Venedig

== See also ==
- List of heads of former ruling families
- List of current monarchies
- List of empires
- List of former monarchies
- List of monarchies
- List of noble houses
- List of political families
- Lists of dynasties
