= Banu Nahd =

Arab tribe

Nahd (نهد)
- Ma'addite / Adnanites / Ishmaelites
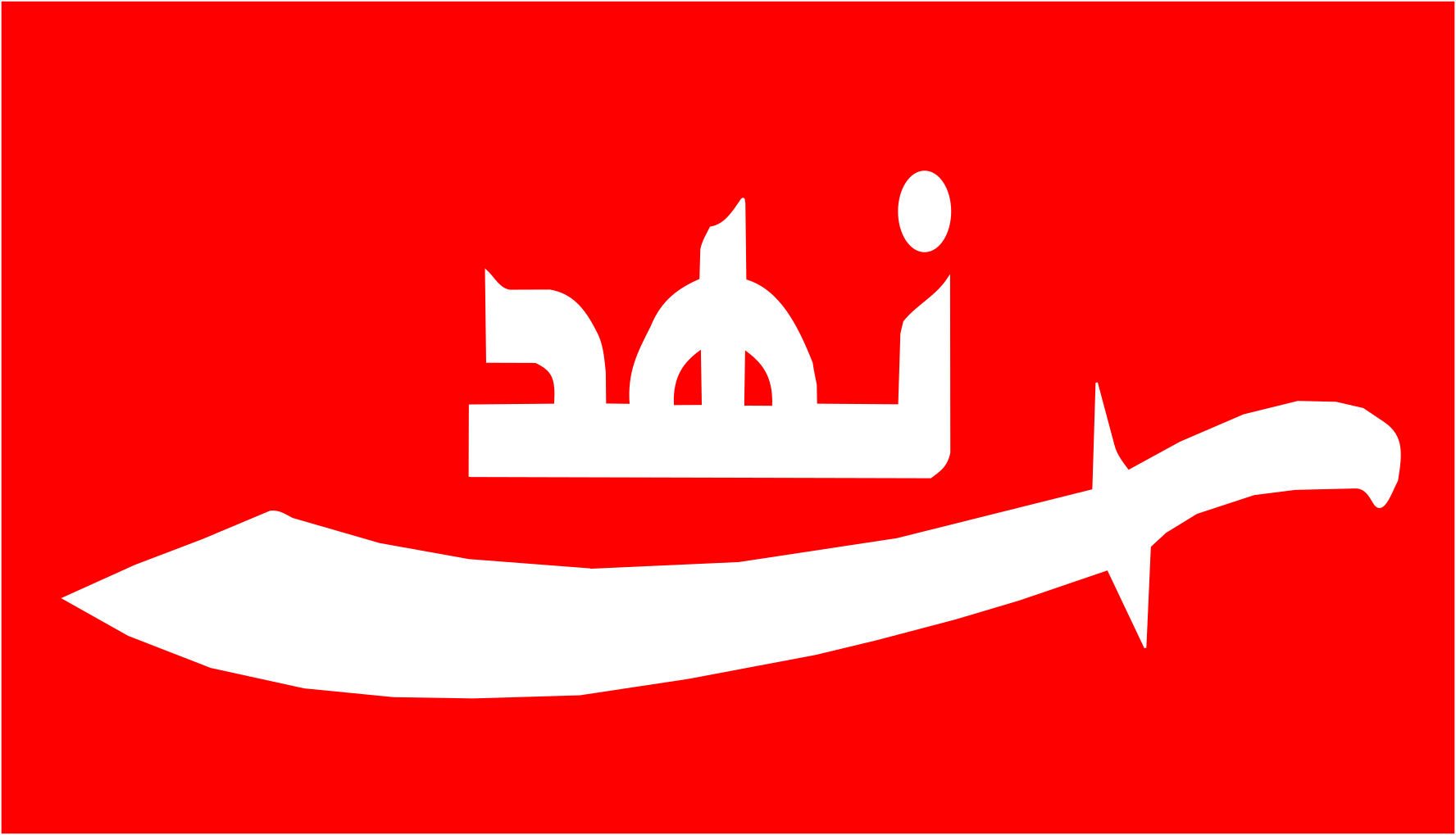
- Ethnicity: Arab
- Nisba: Al-Nahdi (النهدي)
- Location: Yemen, Saudi Arabia, Iraq, Qatar, Oman, United Arab Emirates, Bahrain, Egypt, Levant, India, Somaliland, Spain, Algeria, Tunisia, Kenya & Indonesia
- Descended from: Nahd ibn Zayd ibn Layth ibn Sudd ibn Aslam ibn al-Hāf ibn Quda'a ibn Ma'add ibn Adnan
- Parent tribe: Banu Zayd bin Layth
- Branches: Naheed, Kulayb, Ma'rouf & Al Yamani
- Religion: Islam, previously Paganism

Banu Nahd (Arabic: بنو نهد) is an Arab tribe with a historical presence across the Arabian Peninsula. The tribe traces its lineage to Nahd bin Zayd of the Quda'a confederation, traditionally regarded as either Ma'addite or Qahtanite from Himyar. There is scholarly debate on this point, as pre-Islamic sources generally describe Quda'ah as descendants of Ma'ad ibn 'Adnan.

Genetic studies of haplogroup J1 L222.2 suggest that tribes from Quda'ah, including Banu Nahd, are more closely aligned with the Adnanites, challenging earlier claims of Qahtanite origins that arose during the early Islamic period.

The tribe, also known as Nahd al-ʿĀṣiyah (meaning "Nahd the disobedient"), is symbolized by the number 811. It is divided into four main branches—Naheed, Kulaib, Ma'rouf, and Al Yamani—which are further subdivided into several families. Historically, the Quda'i tribes, including Banu Nahd, inhabited the Tihamah region near Jeddah and Mecca. After a conflict with Nizar, they dispersed throughout Arabia, with Nahd eventually settling in Najran and Bisha, before migrating further across the Arabian Peninsula.

Banu Nahd became an influential tribe in Wadi Hadhramaut, having migrated there from Najran around 1195 CE. In 1224 CE they established control over Hadhramaut after revolting against the Ayyubid governor, contributing to the decline of Ayyubid authority in the region. In 1238 CE, Banu Nahd reasserted their dominance after conflicts with rival tribes, including the Iqbal branch of the Kinda. Despite the rise of the Rasulid dynasty, the Nahd retained influence in parts of Wadi Hadhramaut through continued resistance.

The Nahd were frequently in conflict with the Kathiri tribe, which eventually defeated them and established the Kathiri Sultanate in Hadhramaut. They also had tense relations with the Sayar to the north and the Jaʿada to the south.

In modern times, their leader Al-Hakam Saleh bin Ali bin Thabit has expressed support for a unified Yemen under the Presidential Leadership Council and has allied with the Abidah tribe. Although largely sedentary today, Banu Nahd preserve many Bedouin traditions and continue to practice a distinctive dual chieftainship system.

== Location ==
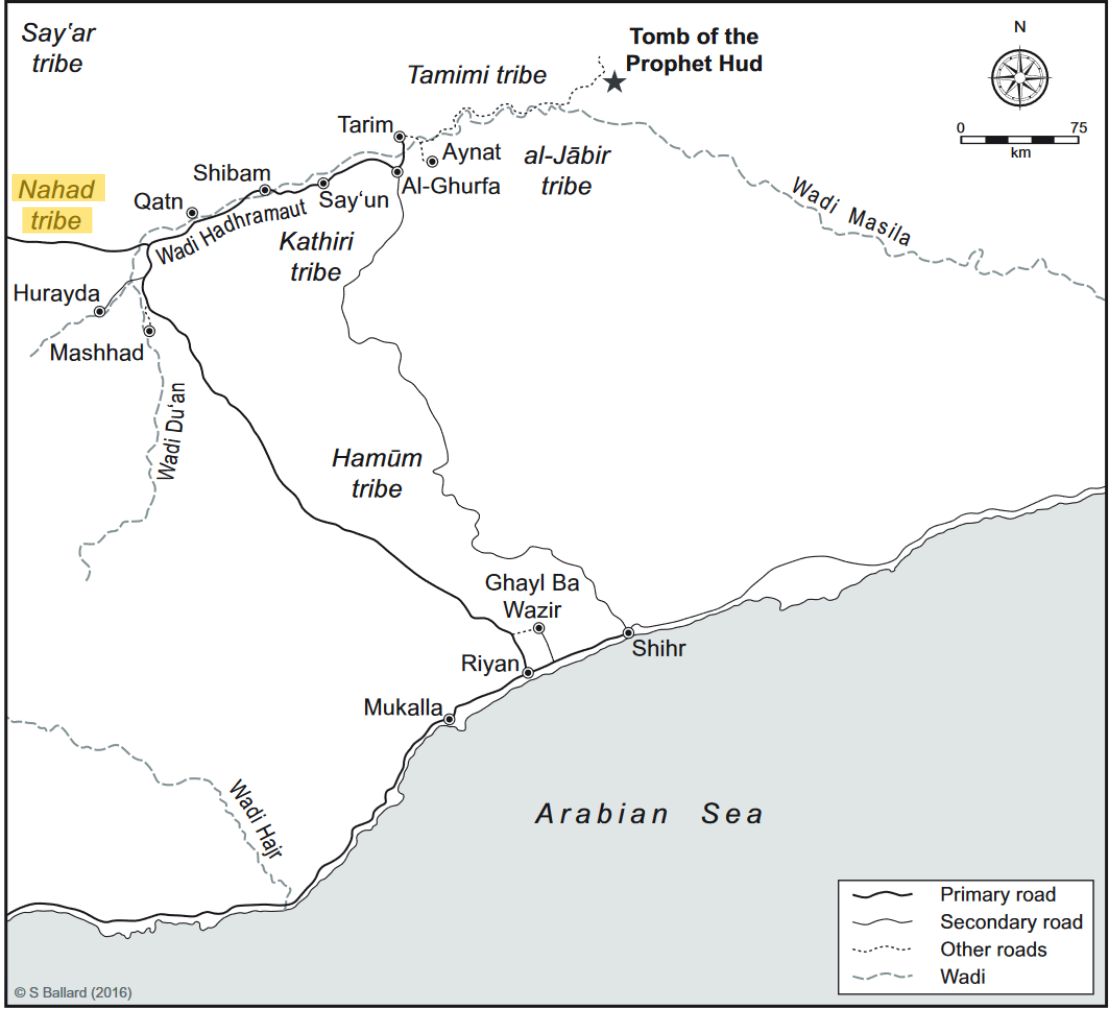
Banu Nahd highlighted in yellow with other Hadhrami tribes

The Nahd originally inhabited Najran, Bisha, Sharurah, Tathleeth, Sarat Abidah, Tareeb, Jash, Tabalah, Qarara, Dhu Baydan, Barda, and Khadara. Before their large-scale migration across Arabia, their capital was at Hajirah, south of Tathleeth between Hamdhah and Amoah. The settlement was located near a gold mine.

Today, Banu Nahd are most prominently based in Wadi Hadhramaut, where their capital, Qaʿudah, is situated. Qaydun in Wadi Dawan, described as one of their main centers, is also under their control. They also inhabit Hajarayn in the same wadi. Nahd territory extends from Al Qatn to the Sayhad Desert.

The Nahd maintain a presence in Wadi 'Amd, reaching as far as Huraidha, as well as in Wadi Rakhiya on the border of Shabwah and in Wadi Dahr in eastern Shabwah. They also inhabit Wadi al-Ain and parts of the Shibam district.

In the Sarawat Mountains, including the Hejaz, the Nahd reside in Wadi al-Safra between Mecca and Medina, as well as in northern Hejaz in Wadi al-Qura.

The tribe also spread into Najd, being among the first Quda'ah groups to settle there. They maintain a presence in the Persian Gulf, particularly in the United Arab Emirates, and are also found in Iraq and Oman. Nahd communities are also present in the Levant.

Beginning in the 11th century, groups from the tribe migrated to North Africa. They are recorded near the border of Algeria and Tunisia, particularly around the city of El Kala in El Taref Province. Nahdi groups also migrated across the Indian Ocean to Java, Indonesia, as well as to Somaliland, India, and Jeddah, Saudi Arabia. Some also migrated to Al-Andalus, particularly to the Province of Rayya in the south of the Caliphate of Córdoba, corresponding to the modern Málaga Province.

== History ==
Banu Nahd was a significant tribe in the Najran Region, which included Bisha and Tabalah. Their numbers grew to the point where they rivaled the major tribe of Madhhaj. They were in conflict with the Jarm tribe, which was allied with Banu Zubayd from Madhhaj, while Nahd was allied with Banu al-Harith, another Madhhaj tribe.

Some members of Nahd took part in the Himyarite war under Abu Karib Asad against the Lakhmids in 428 AD. This campaign included the conquest of Wadi Masil southeast of Dawadimi and extended into Al-Hira, the Lakhmid capital.

Before the advent of Islam, the Nahd practiced polytheism. Prophet Muhammad sent a message to Banu Nahd, along with other Yemeni tribes, calling on them to embrace Islam. Initially hesitant, they eventually accepted Islam without armed conflict. Historical accounts describe them as being well-equipped with weapons.

Following their conversion, the Banu Nahd participated in the Battle of al-Qadisiyyah under the command of Qays ibn Hidhyam ibn Jurthumah. During the Umayyad Caliphate, Qasura ibn Ma‘alal from Nahd was appointed governor of Sistan.

The historian Abu Muhammad al-Hasan al-Hamdani (c. 890s–940s), in his work Al-Iklil (Volume 2), recorded that Madhhaj, allied with Nahd and Khawlan, clashed with the Hawazin tribe, sparking a broader conflict between Quda'ah and the Qaysi tribes.

In 910 AD, Nahd and their allies, Banu al-Harith, were attacked by Yahya bin al-Hussein, the founder of the Zaydi Imamate. Later, the Nahd supported the Sulayhid dynasty under King Ali al-Sulayhi. In 1140, they declared support for the Sulaymanids and fought against the Banu Yam in 1154. In 1195, they began migrating to Hadhramaut along with Banu al-Harith and Banu Dhannah. Historians attribute this to drought, pressure from the Zaydi Imamate, and interest in the agriculture of Wadi Hadhramaut.

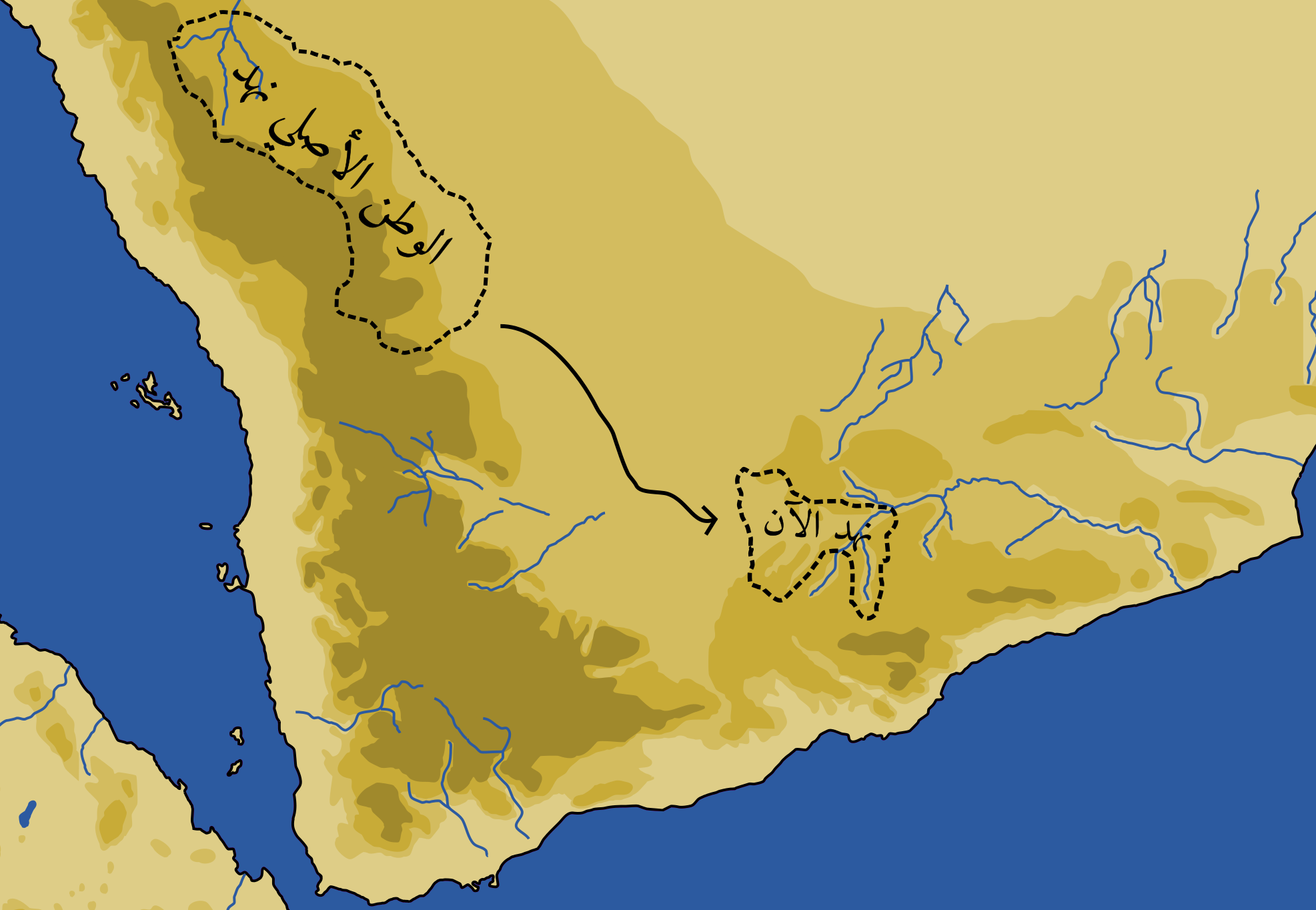
Nahd of Najran and Bisha migrating to Wadi Hadhramaut

From the 13th century onwards, the Nahd engaged in a series of conflicts in Hadhramaut, including sieges of Tarim, Shibam, and Maryamah. They fought against tribes such as Banu Sa'ad and Kinda, and at times clashed with the Ayyubids, the Rasulids, and later the Al Kathiri sultanate. Nahd influence in the region fluctuated between expansion and decline from the 1200s through the 1500s, until the Kathiris ultimately consolidated control.

By the 18th century, Nahd tribes were also active in North Africa. In Algeria and Tunisia, they had longstanding rivalries with the Kroumirs. They occasionally paid tribute to the Beylik of Constantine, engaged in regional conflicts such as the 1772 war with Banu Mazen in El Kala, and later faced suppression by French forces in the 1840s. In 1881, they fought against the Kroumirs again before being halted by the French.

In the late 19th and early 20th centuries, during the Aden Protectorate period, the Nahd maintained relative independence from the Hadhrami sultanates (Qu'aiti and Kathiri). By the 1920s, they had an army of 3,000–4,000 men under Sheikh Ibn Minif, allied with the Qu'aiti and in rivalry with the Sei'ar tribe.

During the 1930s–1940s, the British sought to end tribal warfare in Hadhramaut. Negotiations involving Nahd and Ja'ada resulted in agreements that reduced hostilities, including a truce with the Sei‘ar at Henin.

During the Aden Emergency, Nahd supported the South Arabian League (SAL), a nationalist organization founded in 1951, which opposed the National Liberation Front (NLF). The SAL received support from Saudi Arabia.

In the ongoing Yemeni civil war (2014–present), the Nahd have been divided in their support. Some factions have backed the Southern Transitional Council (STC) and its president Aidarus al-Zoubaidi, while the current tribal leader, Al-Hakam Saleh bin Ali bin Thabit, has declared support for the internationally recognized government of Rashad al-Alimi.

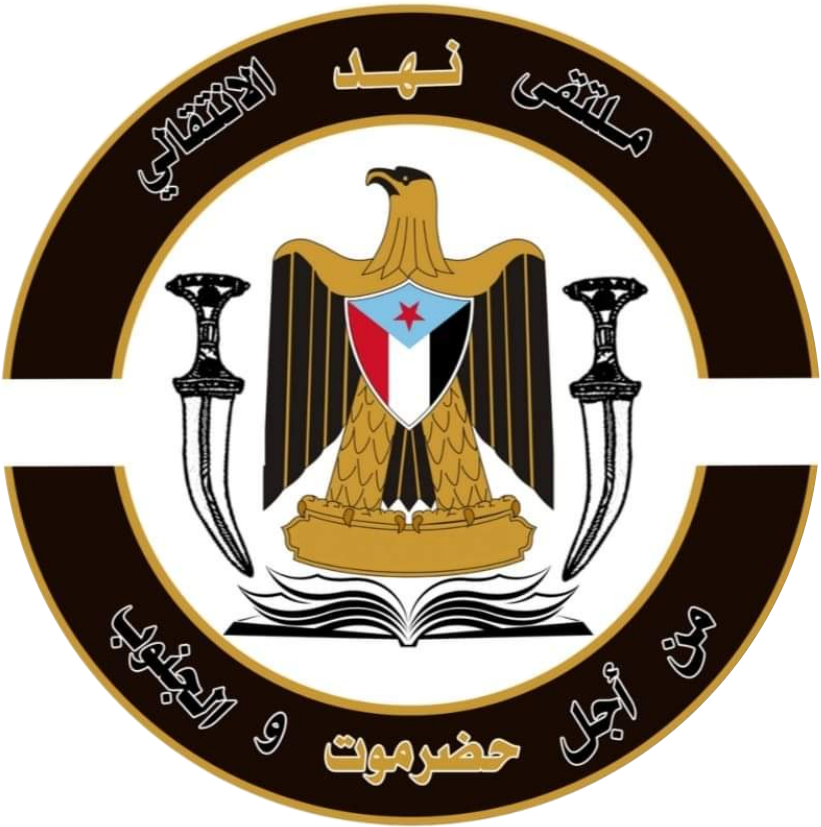
A flag of the Nahdi tribes in support of the STC
