= Shi'b =

A shi'b in Arabic is a "gorge" or "canyon" for a usually (stationary or temporary) dry river. Placenames using the word are common in the Arabic peninsula.

== Saudi Arabia ==
- Shi‘b adh Dhi’b
- Ash Shi`b
- Shi`b `amir

== Yemen ==
- Ash Shiʽb al-Aswad
- Shiʽb an-Nur
- Shiʿb Hūd
