= Al-Adwan =

Al-Adwan (Arabic: العدوان) is a surname of Arabic origin.

Notable people with the surname include:

- Amina Al Adwan, Jordanian writer, poet, and critic
- Imad Al-Adwan, Jordanian politician
- Muhammad Affash al-Adwan, Jordanian diplomat and politician
- Faisal Aladwan, Prince athletes

== See also ==
- Adwan (disambiguation)
