= Adwan =

Adwan (also spelled Edwan, Arabic: عدوان) may refer to:

== People ==
- Atef Adwan (born 1952), Palestinian politician
- Banu 'Adwan, a division of the Banu 'Amr tribe, which is a branch of the Zahran tribe
- Georges Adwan (born 1947), Lebanese politician
- Imad Al-Adwan (born 1988), Jordanian politician
- Kamal Adwan, PLO spokesman killed in 1973 Israeli raid on Lebanon
- Mamdouh Adwan (1941–2004) Syrian Poet and writer
- Nimr ibn Adwan (1735–1823) Jordanian poet and chieftain

== Places ==
- Adwan, Syria, village in southern Syria
- Qarn Bin `Adwan, a village in the Hadhramaut Governorate in eastern Yemen

== See also ==
- Jamilah bint Adwan (born 180 CE), an ancestor of the Islamic prophet Muhammad on both his paternal and maternal sides
- Adwan Rebellion or the Balqa Revolt, a 1923 revolt, the largest uprising against the newly established Transjordanian government, headed by Mezhar Ruslan, during its first years
