= Al kharabah =

Al kharabah may refer to:

- Al kharabah, Jizan, Saudi Arabia
- Al kharabah, San‘a’, Yemen
- Al kharabah, Hadhramaut, Yemen
