= Mukalla District =

Mukalla District may refer to:

- Mukalla City District, capital of the Hadhramaut Governorate
- Mukalla Rural District
