= Al-Hami =

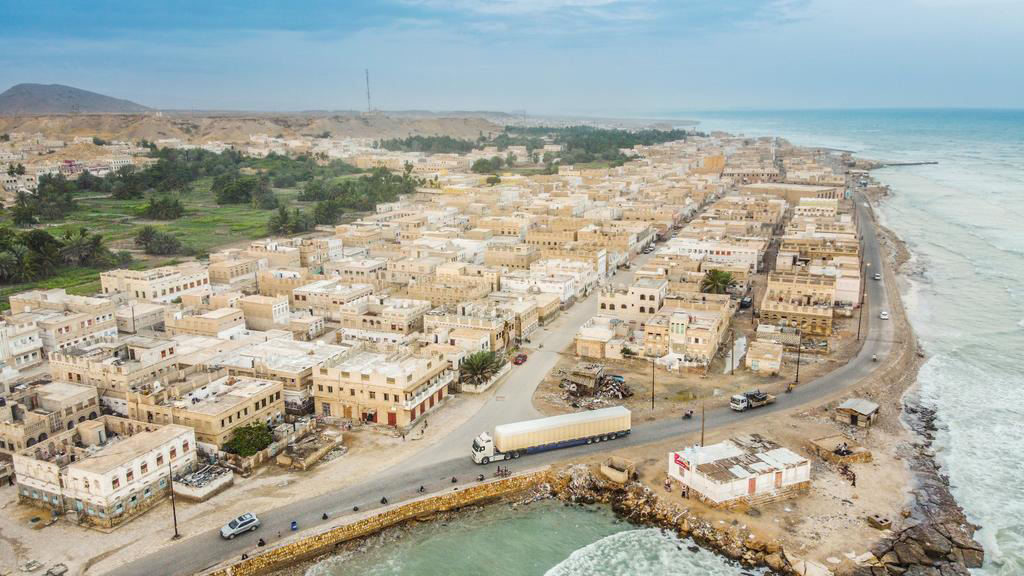
- Interactive map of Al-Hami
- Coordinates: 14°48′55″N 49°50′18″E
- Country: Yemen
- Governorate: Hadhramaut
- Time zone: UTC+3 (Yemen Standard Time)

Al-Hami (Arabic: الحامي) is a coastal city in eastern Yemen. It is located in the Al-Shihr District of Hadhramaut Governorate, with a population of 9,844 people according to the 2004 Yemeni census.

== Geography ==
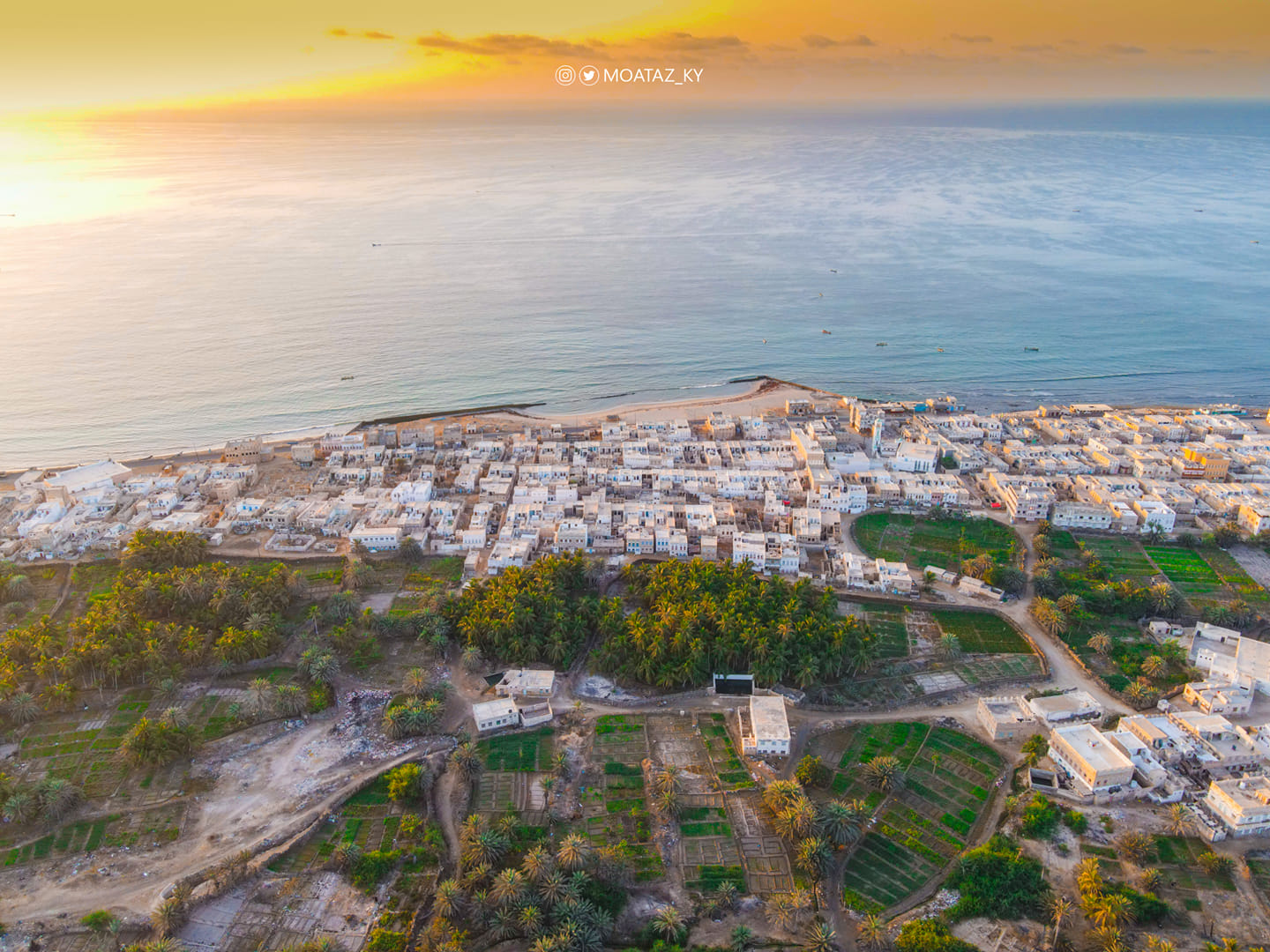
Aerial view of al-Hami

Al-Hami is surrounded by the Arabian Sea and the Indian Ocean to the south, and by a range of mountains to the north. It is located east of Al-Shihr and is 23 kilometers away from it, and 81 kilometers away from Al-Mukalla.

The area is characterized by a strip-like extension along the coast, sandwiched between mountains to the north and the sea to the south, with some plateau extensions within the city. The city is divided into sequential sections (coast, buildings, farms, mountains) from south to north.

Al-Hami is known for its numerous sulfuric hot springs.

It has been referred to by various names, including Al-Hamiah, Al-Faw, Al-Bandar, Al-Hami, Beld Al-Kassadi, and Al-Muhtamiyah.

== Population ==
The population of Al-Hami was 9,844 people according to the 2004 census, with 1,502 households.

== Climate ==
Al-Hami experiences a hot summer climate typical of the southern Yemeni coast and the tropical location of the country, with a general increase in humidity throughout the year and relatively moderate temperatures during the winter. Winds are predominantly from the east and southeast, but in June, they shift to southwesterly winds.

== Life and Economy ==
Most of the residents of Al-Hami are engaged in fishing, while a small number work in government jobs and agriculture. Some have migrated to the Persian Gulf region, especially Kuwait.

== Maritime Heritage ==
The primary occupation of the people of Al-Hami historically was maritime navigation. Several prominent sailors hailed from the region, described as "the pillars of southern maritime navigation throughout history." Some of the most famous include Sheikh Saeed Salim Batayih (died 1261 AH), navigator Awad Ahmed bin Arwa (died 1333 AH), navigator Omar Ubaid Basaleh (1361 AH), navigator Muhammad Awad Eidid (1358 AH), navigator Muhammad Abdullah Ba'abad (died in 1981 AD), and navigator Abdullah Saeed Hubaishan.

== Gallery ==
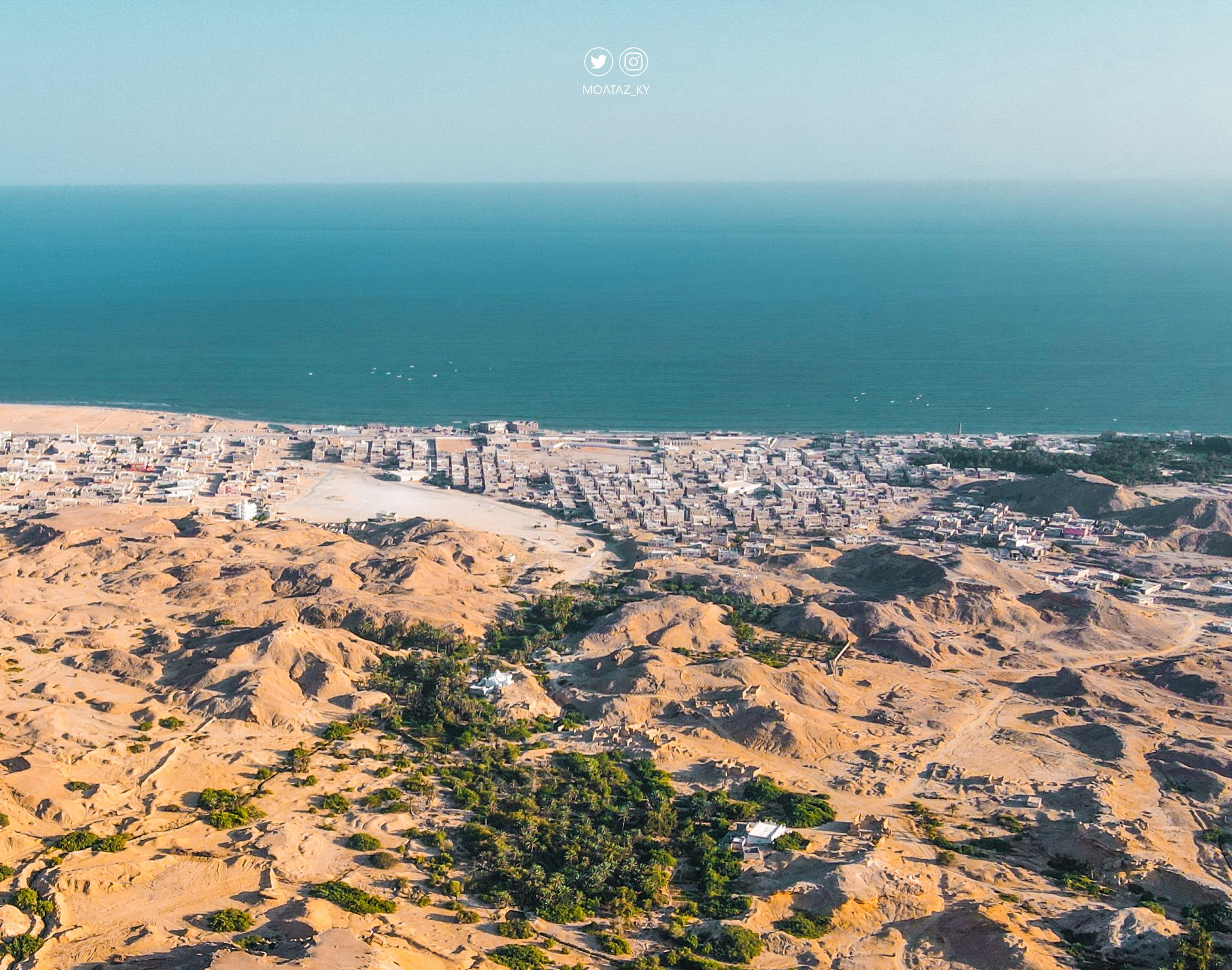

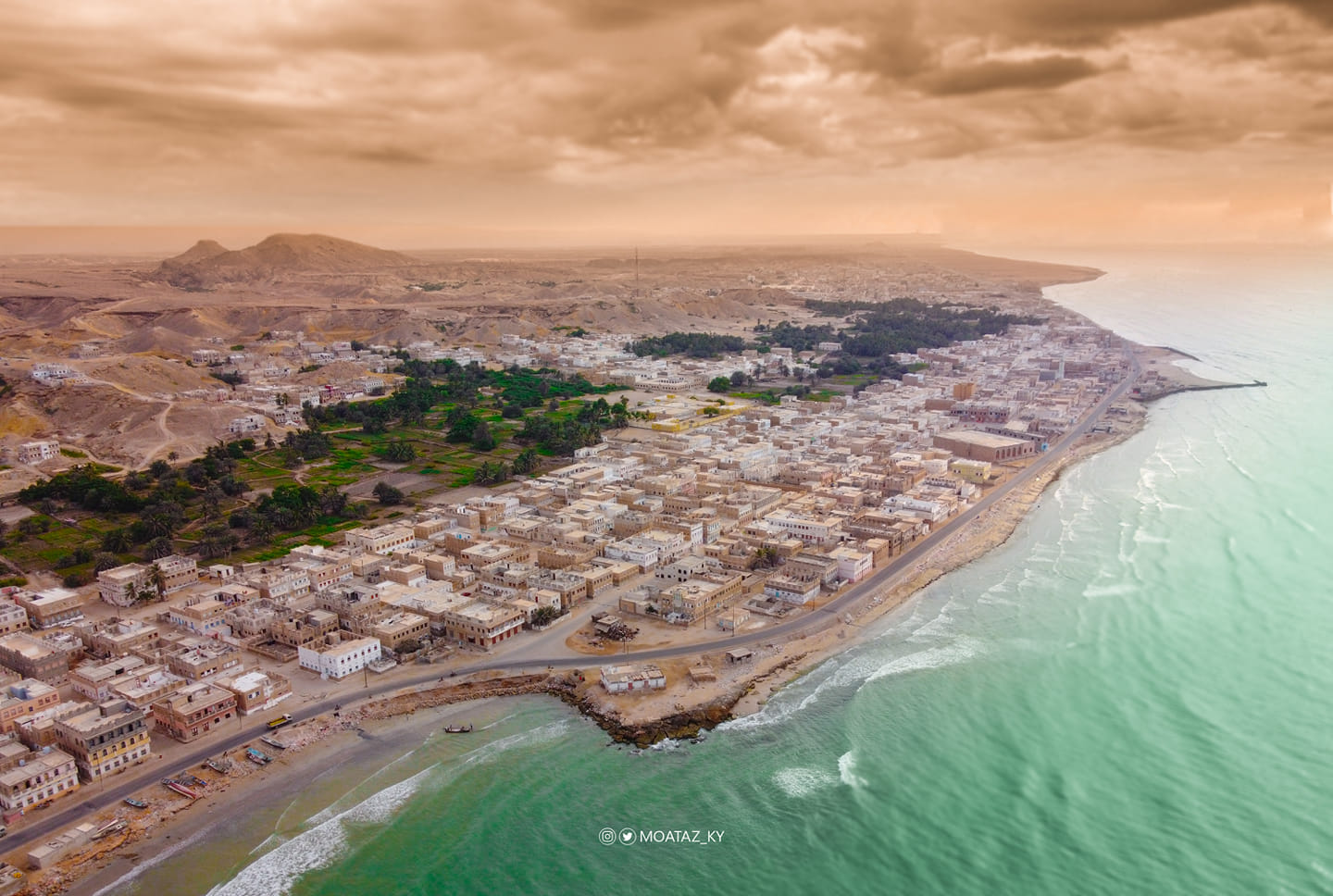

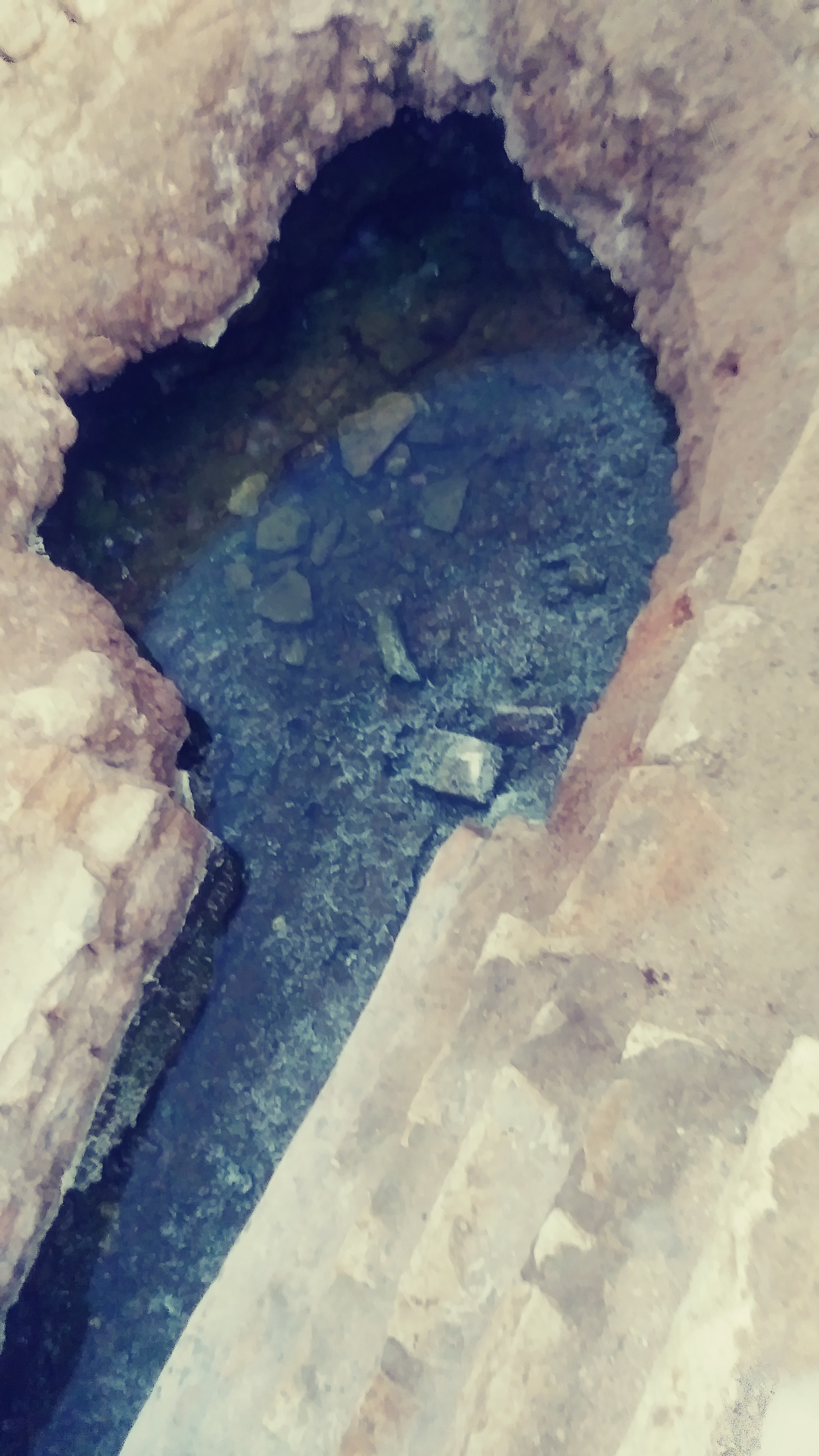
Ain Al-Rawdah, a sulfuric hot spring in Al-Hami
