= ʽAtud =

Coordinates: 14°53′N 48°09′E

- Interactive map of ʽAtud
- Country: Yemen
- Governorate: Hadhramaut
- Time zone: UTC+3 (Yemen Standard Time)

ʽAtud is a village in eastern Yemen. It is located in the Hadhramaut Governorate, Adh Dhlia'ah district. It is near the Al Waḩdah aş Şiḩḩīyah aḑ Ḑulay‘ah clinic.
