= Az Zaghfah =

- Location in Yemen
- Coordinates: 14°45′N 49°31′E
- Country: Yemen
- Governorate: Hadhramaut
- Time zone: UTC+3 (Yemen Standard Time)

Az Zaghfah is a village in eastern Yemen. It is located in the Hadhramaut Governorate near the coast, in the Ash Shihr District. Az Zaghfah is known by many names, including Al-Zaghfah, Zaghfa, and Zaghtal. The Sunrise and Sunset are at approximately 5:10 AM and 6:10 PM respectively (Note: Note that exact minutes vary depending on the time of year as with all areas on Earth, these are just the averages). Its population, as of December 17, 2004, is 803, according to the Central Statistical Organization (Yemen.)who did a survey on that same date, and conducted its census in accordance with their roughly one decade long interval between such surveys.
