= Al-Mekrab =

- Rural sub-district
- Location within Yemen
- Coordinates: 15.014876°N 48.013768°E
- Country: Yemen
- District: Adh Dhlia'ah district
- Governorate: Hadhramaut Governorate

Population (2014)
  - Total: 158
- Time zone: UTC+3 (AST)
  - Summer (DST): AST

Al-Mekrab (Arabic: المكراب) is a rural sub-district's village in Adh Dhlia'ah district, Hadhramaut Governorate, Yemen.

According to the 2004 Yemeni Census, the population of the sub-district was 118 residents.

As of 2014, the population of Al-Mekrab reached 158.
