= Numayr =

Numayr may refer to:

- Numayrid dynasty, a dynasty of chieftains of the Banu Numayr tribe that ruled parts of Upper Mesopotamia in the 10th–12th centuries.
- Numayr, Hadhramaut, Yemen
- Numayr, San‘a’, Yemen
