= Murabbaʽ Ba Ghamis =

Coordinates: 14°58′N 48°26′E

- Interactive map of Murabbaʽ Ba Ghamis
- Country: Yemen
- Governorate: Hadhramaut
- District: Daw'an
- Elevation: 4,829 ft (1,472 m)
- Time zone: UTC+3 (Yemen Standard Time)

Murabbaʽ Ba Ghamis is a village in eastern Yemen. It is located in Daw'an District in Hadhramaut Governorate.
