= Al Abr =

- Town
- Location in Yemen
- Coordinates: 16°8′N 47°14′E
- Country: Yemen
- Governorate: Hadhramaut Governorate.
- District: Al Abr
- Time zone: GMT+3

Al Abr or Al ‘Abr (Arabic: آل العبر) is a small town in central-eastern Yemen. It is the seat of Al Abr district of the Hadhramaut Governorate. It is served by a small airport.

== History ==
A number of megalithic sites have been found in the surrounding area. The original settlement there consisted of a cluster of wells in the wadi protected by an ancient fort (husn). Caravans on the Incense Route would water there and the place also served as a base for Bedouin tribes such as Sa'ar or Sei'ar. Abdulla bin Schuwail al Dawsai, who was active against the Sa'ar in the late 1940s, is known to have been present in the town. One of the first western women to reach this area was Barbara Toy who wrote of her visit there in the 1960s.

== Geography ==
To reach it from Sana'a involves hundreds of miles of driving across desert. It lies along the N5 highway, north-northwest of Seiyun. The Wadi Hadhramaut has its source near Al Abr and it is about 3,000 feet above sea level. It is served by a small airport.

== Poetry ==
Poetry is politically significant in the region and the popular poet, Khamis Salim Kindi, made reference to the place in a famous quatrain about the powerful Adbat clan whose area was bombed by the British during WW2 because of their Axis sympathies, as the British had previously bombed the al-Say'ar tribe in the al-'Abr area.

Thou wert repelled, o Ghurfah, like Berlin
By Mister Ingrams and Chamberlain.
They thought thee to be al-'Abr,
[That] when attacked with bombs thou wilt atone.
