= Barwaj =

- Location in Yemen
- Coordinates: 15°50′N 48°26′E
- Country: Yemen
- Governorate: Hadhramaut
- Time zone: UTC+3 (Yemen Standard Time)

Barwaj is a village in eastern Yemen. It is located in the Hadhramaut Governorate, Al Qatn District.
