= Al Dahama (Dawan) =

Al Dahama الدهماء
- Country: Yemen
- Governorate: Hadhramaut

Population (2004)
  - Total: 250
- Time zone: UTC+3 (Yemen Standard Time)

Al Dahama (Arabic: الدهماء) is a village in Daw'an District. It is located in the Hadhramaut Governorate, According to the 2004 census it had a population of 250 people.
