= Lubayb =

Coordinates: 14°41′N 49°05′E

- Interactive map of Lubayb
- Country: Yemen
- Governorate: Hadhramaut
- Time zone: UTC+3 (Yemen Standard Time)

Lubayb is a village in eastern Yemen. It is located in the Hadhramaut Governorate.
