= Jilʽah =

Coordinates: 14°02′N 48°08′E

- Interactive map of Jilʽah
- Country: Yemen
- Governorate: Hadhramaut
- Time zone: UTC+3 (Yemen Standard Time)

Jilʽah is a village in eastern Yemen. It is located in the Hadhramaut Governorate.
