= Al-Harshiyat =

Coordinates: 14°36′N 49°10′E

- Interactive map of Al-Harshiyat
- Country: Yemen
- Governorate: Hadhramaut
- Time zone: UTC+3 (Yemen Standard Time)

Al-Harshiyat is a village in eastern Yemen. It is located in the Hadhramaut Governorate.
