= Al-Hadiyah =

- Interactive map of Al-Hadiyah
- Coordinates: 14.526°N 43.569°E
- Country: Yemen
- Governorate: Hadhramaut
- Time zone: UTC+3 (Yemen Standard Time)

Al-Hadiyah is a village in east-central Yemen. It is located in the Hadhramaut Governorate.
