= Fughmah =

Coordinates: 16°09′N 49°26′E

- Interactive map of Fughmah
- Country: Yemen
- Governorate: Hadhramaut
- Time zone: UTC+3 (Yemen Standard Time)

Fughmah is a village in eastern Yemen. It is located in the Hadhramaut Governorate.
