= Al-Lisb =

Coordinates: 14°41′N 49°07′E

- Interactive map of Al-Lisb
- Country: Yemen
- Governorate: Hadhramaut
- Time zone: UTC+3 (Yemen Standard Time)

Al-Lisb is a village in eastern Yemen. It is located in the Hadhramaut Governorate.
