= Al-Juwadah =

Coordinates: 15°55′N 48°31′E

- Interactive map of Al-Juwadah
- Country: Yemen
- Governorate: Hadhramaut
- Time zone: UTC+3 (Yemen Standard Time)

Al-Juwadah is a village in east-central Yemen. It is located in the Hadhramaut Governorate.
