= Al-Bahth =

Coordinates: 14°32′N 48°45′E

- Interactive map of Al-Bahth
- Country: Yemen
- Governorate: Hadhramaut
- Time zone: UTC+3 (Yemen Standard Time)

Al-Bahth is a village in east-central Yemen. It is located in the Hadhramaut Governorate.
