= ʽAnaq =

Coordinates: 15°21′N 48°01′E

`Anaq
- Interactive map of `Anaq
- Country: Yemen
- Governorate: Hadhramaut
- Time zone: UTC+3 (Yemen Standard Time)

`Anaq is a village in eastern Yemen. It is located in the Hadhramaut Governorate.
