= Kaydam Ba Masdus =

Coordinates: 15°01′N 48°09′E

- Interactive map of Kaydam Ba Masdus
- Country: Yemen
- Governorate: Hadhramaut
- Time zone: UTC+3 (Yemen Standard Time)

Kaydam Ba Masdus is a village in eastern Yemen. It is located in the Hadhramaut Governorate.
