= Hazm Haynan =

Coordinates: 15°50′N 48°18′E

- Interactive map of Hazm Haynan
- Country: Yemen
- Governorate: Hadhramaut Governorate
- Time zone: UTC+3 (Yemen Standard Time)

Hazm Haynan is a village in eastern Yemen. It is located in the Hadhramaut Governorate.
