= Al-Hamid, Hadhramaut =

Coordinates: 15°49′N 48°40′E

Al-Hamid
- Interactive map of Al-Hamid
- Country: Yemen
- Governorate: Hadhramaut Governorate
- Time zone: UTC+3 (Yemen Standard Time)

Al-Hamid is a village in eastern Yemen. It is located in the Hadhramaut Governorate.
