= Niʽaydah =

Coordinates: 15°19′N 48°46′E

- Interactive map of Niʽaydah
- Country: Yemen
- Governorate: Hadhramaut
- Time zone: UTC+3 (Yemen Standard Time)

Niʽaydah is a village in eastern Yemen. It is located in the Hadhramaut Governorate.
