= ʽAjlaniyah =

Coordinates: 15°48′N 48°19′E

`Ajlaniyah
- Interactive map of `Ajlaniyah
- Country: Yemen
- Governorate: Hadramaut
- Time zone: UTC+3 (Yemen Standard Time)

`Ajlaniyah is a village in eastern Yemen. It is located in the Hadhramaut Governorate.
