= Al-Mutaywil =

- Location in Yemen
- Coordinates: 16°00′N 48°48′E
- Country: Yemen
- Governorate: Hadhramaut
- Time zone: UTC+3 (Yemen Standard Time)

Al-Mutaywil is a village in east-central Yemen. It is located in the Hadhramaut Governorate.
