= Subaykh =

Coordinates: 15°14′N 48°22′E

- Interactive map of Subaykh
- Country: Yemen
- Governorate: Hadhramaut
- Time zone: UTC+3 (Yemen Standard Time)

Subaykh is a village in eastern Yemen. It is located in the Hadhramaut Governorate.
