= Al-Haylah =

Coordinates: 14°07′N 48°40′E

- Interactive map of Al-Haylah
- Country: Yemen
- Governorate: Hadhramaut
- Time zone: UTC+3 (Yemen Standard Time)

Al-Haylah is a village in east-central Yemen. It is located in the Hadhramaut Governorate.
