= An Najil =

Coordinates: 14°36′N 49°13′E

- Interactive map of An Najil
- Country: Yemen
- Governorate: Hadhramaut
- Time zone: UTC+3 (Yemen Standard Time)

An Najil is a village in eastern Yemen. It is located in the Hadhramaut Governorate.
