= Al Abr district =

- District
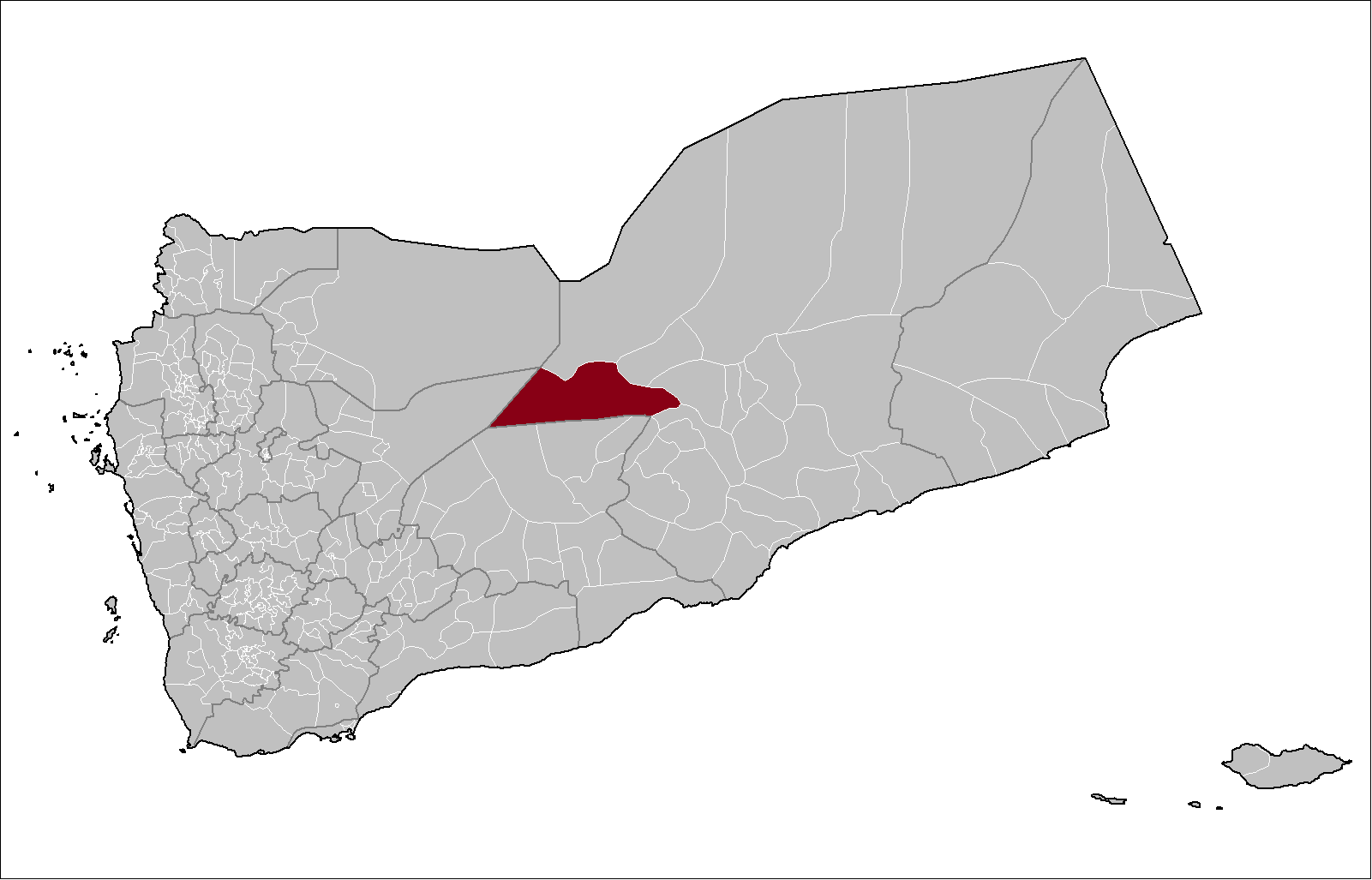
- The district highlighted in Yemen
- Coordinates: 16°8′N 47°14′E
- Country: Yemen
- Governorate: Hadhramaut
- Capital: Al Abr

Population (2021)
  - Total: 13,053
- Time zone: UTC+3 (Yemen Standard Time)

Al Abr district is a district of the Hadhramaut Governorate, Yemen. As of 2021, the district had a population of 13,053 inhabitants.
