= Ad Dufah =

Coordinates: 15°15′N 48°22′E

- Interactive map of Ad Dufah
- Country: Yemen
- Governorate: Hadhramaut
- Time zone: UTC+3 (Yemen Standard Time)

Ad Dufah is a village in east-central Yemen. It is located in the Hadhramaut Governorate.
