= Al-Ghuwayr =

Coordinates: 15°01′N 48°10′E

- Interactive map of Al-Ghuwayr
- Country: Yemen
- Governorate: Hadhramaut
- Time zone: UTC+3 (Yemen Standard Time)

Al-Ghuwayr is a village in east-central Yemen. It is located in the Hadhramaut Governorate.
