= Jaʽʽarah =

Coordinates: 15°53′N 48°38′E

- Interactive map of Jaʽʽarah
- Country: Yemen
- Governorate: Hadhramaut
- Time zone: UTC+3 (Yemen Standard Time)

Jaʽʽarah (جعرہ) is a village in eastern Yemen. It is located in the Hadhramaut Governorate.

The Hadhramaut Governorate, in which Jaʽʽarah is located, is characterized by a mix of arid desert plains and fertile valley oases that support traditional agriculture, including date palms and grains, reflecting the varied landscapes of eastern Yemen. Many small villages in the region share similar rural lifestyles and historical connections to the larger Hadhrami cultural and economic networks.

The region encompassing Jaʽʽarah and other settlements in Hadhramaut features a combination of inland valleys and seasonal watercourses that have historically supported irrigation-based agriculture and linked rural communities within broader economic and social networks of eastern Yemen.
