= Ar Rihib =

Coordinates: 15°24′N 48°02′E

- Interactive map of Ar Rihib
- Country: Yemen
- Governorate: Hadhramaut
- Time zone: UTC+3 (Yemen Standard Time)

Ar Rihib is a village in eastern Yemen. It is located in the Hadhramaut Governorate.
