= Al Kathiri =

Arab tribe

Al Kathiri Adnanites / Ishmaelites
- Ethnicity: Arab
- Location: Arabian Peninsula; Southeast Asia; Eastern Africa; Iran
- Descended from: Dhanna ibn Haram an-Nahdi
- Parent tribe: Banu Nahd
- Language: Arabic
- Religion: Islam

The Al Kathiri (Arabic: الكثيري) is an Arab tribe based in the south of the Arabian Peninsula. It is one of the largest tribes of Banu Quda'a who have alliance with Banu Hamdan of Hadramawt in eastern Yemen and Oman, with populations in Saudi Arabia, Qatar, United Arab Emirates, Indonesia, and East African countries such as Somalia, Kenya, and Tanzania as well as Iran mainly concentrated in the most Arabic populated province of the country Khuzestan. There are two tribes of Al Kathiri, one that allied with Banu Hamdan, and one that is allied with Banu Lam, which is descended from Tayy tribe.

Genetic studies of haplogroup J1 L222.2 suggest that tribes from Quda'ah, including Al Kathiri, are more closely aligned with the Adnanites, challenging earlier claims of Qahtanite origins that arose during the early Islamic period.

== Al-Kathiri Family and Al-Kathiri Sultanate ==
Al-Kathiri Family and the Al-Kathiri Sultanate formed a natural alliance with Banu Hamdan and some other tribes since the near past. The Al Kathiri or Sultanate Al Kathiri extended to Dhofar and Shabwa in the east to the west and north into the Empty Quarter and south to the seashore of the Arabian Sea, particularly the city of Shahr. Most of the Hadhrami tribes were under the protection of Sultanate Al Kathiri, but there were some tribes that rebelled such as Alhmoum, Sheikh Al Amoudi and Yafa, however Sultanate was able to overcome these challenges.

Sultanate Qu'aiti emerged at the beginning of the 19th century with the Britain support and shared Sultanate Alkatiri in ruling. The north and the east of Hadramout remained under the control of Alkathiri and the west became with Qu'aiti. The two Sultanates entered in long wars lasted for 100 years till they reconciled and signed a treaty under the superintendence of the British colonial in 1937 AD in the palace of the Sultan Al Kathiri in Seiyoun, Alkatiri's capital. Signing the agreements was attended too by other Hadhrami tribes such as Nahed, Awamer, Sei’ar and Alhmoum as well as Yafa tribe.

As a result of these long years of wars to expand the influence and gain control, many of the stages and the details of Al Kathiri history and their Sultanate was hidden and did not stand out enough.

== Home of Al Kathir Tribes ==
Al Kathiri live in several regions in Yemen, Oman, the United Arab Emirates, Saudi Arabia and Qatar. However, they mainly populate Hadramout and Mahara provinces in Yemen, and the province of Dhofar in Oman. They also have presence in Southeast Asia and East Africa. Omar Ba Omar (آل عمر باعمر) are an example of the presence of Al Kathiri in Eastern Africa specifically Somalia in cities such as Mogadishu, Merca, Baraawe, Diinsor.

The most important areas of Al Kathir tribe in Hadhramaut are Seiyoun, Shibam, Tarim, Ned Al Kathir (Quff), Sah, Sheil Djaima, Algarah, Alhazem, Alghurfa, Almasila, Alardh, Aradh Al-Abdullah, Tris, Alghuraf, Mdodh, Redood, Shahar, Eynat, Alhota, Mukalla and Al-Jawf, Thamood, Buhyra, Faret, Al Fez Castle, Algufel, Al Aas Castle, Aredh AlSuqair, Sheil Shibam, Almahjar, Almsial and Wadi Sir, Ajlanyh, Albeda, Jahz, Saleel Al Kathir, Wadi Ben Ali, Wadi Ne'aam, Wadi Sh'houh, Rydat bin Abdel-Wadood, Gosaiar and the coast of Hadramout.There are two bigger tribes Like Jaddad And whoaur These Tribes Hold The Thrones To The Alkathiri Family.

Sultan Al-Kathiri
1395 - 1430	Badr as-Sahab ibn al-Habrali Bu Tuwairik
ca. 1430 - ca. 1450	Muhammad ibn Ali
bis ca. 1493	Ja'far ibn 'Abdallah
ca. 1516 - ca. 1565	Badr ibn Abdallah
ca. 1565 - 19th Century	Unknown Sheikhs
1670 - 1690	Ja'far ibn Abdallah al-Kathiri
1690 - 1707	Badr ibn Ja'far al-Kathiri
1707 - 1725	Abdallah ibn Badr al-Kathiri
1725 - 1760	Amr ibn Badr al-Kathiri
1760 - 1800	Ahmad ibn Amr al-Kathiri
1800 - 1830	Muhsin ibn Ahmad al-Kathiri
1830 - 1880	Ghalib ibn Muhsin al-Kathiri
1880 - Mai 1929	Mansur ibn Ghalib al-Kathiri
Mai 1929 - 1938	Ali ibn al-Mansur al-Kathiri
1938 - 24. April 1949	Ja'far ibn al-Mansur al-Kathiri
April 1949 - 2. Oktober 1967	Husain ibn Ali al-Kathiri

== See also ==
- Tribes of Arabia
- Iranian Arabs
