= Rakhyah district =

Coordinates: 15°30′N 47°45′E

Rakhyah District مديرية رخية
- District
- Interactive map of Rakhyah District
- Country: Yemen
- Governorate: Hadhramaut

Population (2021)
  - Total: 13,466
- Time zone: UTC+3 (Yemen Standard Time)

Rakhyah District (Arabic: مديرية رخية) is a district of the Hadhramaut Governorate, Yemen. As of 2021, the district had a population of 13,466 inhabitants.
