= As Sirrayn =

Coordinates: 14°49′N 48°23′E

- Interactive map of As Sirrayn
- Country: Yemen
- Governorate: Hadhramaut
- Time zone: UTC+3 (Yemen Standard Time)

As Sirrayn is a village in eastern Yemen. It is located in the Hadhramaut Governorate.
