= Ar Ridah Ash Sharqiyiah =

Coordinates: 15°04′N 50°17′E

- Interactive map of Ar Ridah Ash Sharqiyiah
- Country: Yemen
- Governorate: Hadhramaut Governorate
- Time zone: UTC+3 (Yemen Standard Time)

Ar Ridah Ash Sharqiyiah is a village in eastern Yemen. It is located in the Hadhramaut Governorate.
