= Asfal al-ʽAyn =

Coordinates: 14°41′N 48°51′E

- Interactive map of Asfal al-ʽAyn
- Country: Yemen
- Governorate: Hadhramaut Governorate
- Time zone: UTC+3 (Yemen Standard Time)

Asfal al-ʽAyn is a village in eastern Yemen. It is located in the Hadhramaut Governorate.
