= Al-Madudah =

Coordinates: 15°59′N 48°45′E

- Interactive map of Al-Madudah
- Country: Yemen
- Governorate: Hadhramaut
- Time zone: UTC+3 (Yemen Standard Time)

Al-Madudah is a village in east-central Yemen, located in the Hadhramaut Governorate.
