= Rabad Ba Suwadih =

Coordinates: 15°05′N 48°10′E

- Interactive map of Rabad Ba Suwadih
- Country: Yemen
- Governorate: Hadhramaut
- Time zone: UTC+3 (Yemen Standard Time)

Rabad Ba Suwadih is a village in eastern Yemen. It is located in the Hadhramaut Governorate.
