= Al-Ghaydah al-Khadra' =

- Location in Yemen
- Coordinates: 14°13′03″N 48°48′12″E
- Country: Yemen
- Governorate: Hadhramaut Governorate
- Time zone: UTC+3 (Yemen Standard Time)

Al-Ghaydah al-Khadra' is a village in eastern Yemen. It is located in the Hadhramaut Governorate.
