= Mankhar =

Coordinates: 15°48′N 48°23′E

Muddaher
- Interactive map of Muddaher
- Country: Yemen
- Governorate: Hadhramaut
- Time zone: UTC+3 (Yemen Standard Time)

Mankhar is a village in eastern Yemen. It is located in the Hadhramaut Governorate.
