= Al-Gharah =

Coordinates: 14°47′N 49°23′E

- Interactive map of Al-Gharah
- Country: Yemen
- Governorate: Hadhramaut
- Time zone: UTC+3 (Yemen Standard Time)

Al Qarāh (Arabic: القراه) is a village in Yemen. It is located in the Hadhramaut Governorate.
