= Minwakh =

Coordinates: 16°48′N 48°07′E

- Interactive map of Minwakh
- Country: Yemen
- Governorate: Hadhramaut
- Time zone: UTC+3 (Yemen Standard Time)

Minwakh is a village in eastern Yemen. It is located in the Hadhramaut Governorate.
