= Al-Fardah =

Coordinates: 14°51′N 48°26′E

- Interactive map of Al-Fardah
- Country: Yemen
- Governorate: Hadhramaut
- Time zone: UTC+3 (Yemen Standard Time)

Al-Fardah is a village in east-central Yemen. It is located in the Hadhramaut Governorate.
