= ʽArd as-Suqayr =

Coordinates: 15°59′N 48°46′E

`Ard As Suqayr
- Interactive map of `Ard As Suqayr
- Country: Yemen
- Governorate: Hadramaut
- Time zone: UTC+3 (Yemen Standard Time)

`Ard As Suqayr is a village in eastern Yemen. It is located in the Hadhramaut Governorate.
