= Ar Rawuk =

Coordinates: 15°42′N 48°53′E

- Interactive map of Ar Rawuk
- Country: Yemen
- Governorate: Hadhramaut
- Time zone: UTC+3 (Yemen Standard Time)

Ar Rawuk is a village in eastern Yemen. It is located in the Hadhramaut Governorate.
