= Al-Hadah =

Coordinates: 16°03′N 48°21′E

- Interactive map of Al-Hadah
- Country: Yemen
- Governorate: Hadhramaut
- Time zone: UTC+3 (Yemen Standard Time)

Al-Hadah is a village in east-central Yemen. It is located in the Hadhramaut Governorate.
