= Kalbut =

- Location in Yemen
- Coordinates: 14°34′51″N 48°48′24″E
- Country: Yemen
- Governorate: Hadhramaut
- Time zone: UTC+3 (Yemen Standard Time)

Kalbut is a village in eastern Yemen. It is located in the Hadhramaut Governorate.
