= Al-Ghuyaydah =

- Interactive map of Al-Ghuyaydah
- Coordinates: 16.206°N 52.180°E
- Country: Yemen
- Governorate: Hadhramaut
- Time zone: UTC+3 (Yemen Standard Time)

Al-Ghuyaydah is a village in eastern Yemen. It is located in the Hadhramaut Governorate.
