= Mahasin =

Coordinates: 15°51′N 48°39′E

- Interactive map of Mahasin
- Country: Yemen
- Governorate: Hadhramaut
- Time zone: UTC+3 (Yemen Standard Time)

Mahasin is a village in eastern Yemen. It is located in the Hadhramaut Governorate.
