= Ghayl Bin Yamin district =

Ghayl Bin Yamin District مديرية غيل بن يمين
- District
- Interactive map of Ghayl Bin Yamin District
- Coordinates: 15°15′N 49°35′E
- Country: Yemen
- Governorate: Hadhramaut

Population (2021)
  - Total: 43,279
- Time zone: UTC+3 (Yemen Standard Time)

Ghayl Bin Yamin District (Arabic: مديرية غيل بن يمين) is a district of the Hadhramaut Governorate, Yemen. As of 2021, the district had a population of 43,279 inhabitants.
