= An-Naqʽah =

- Country: Yemen
- Governorate: Hadhramaut Governorate
- Time zone: UTC+3 (Yemen Standard Time)

An-Naqʽah (Al-Naqaʽah) is a village in eastern Yemen. It is located in the Hadhramaut Governorate.
