= Maṣnaʽah =

- Interactive map of Maṣnaʽah
- Coordinates: 14°27′15″N 48°16′47″E
- Country: Yemen
- Governorate: Hadhramaut
- Time zone: UTC+3 (Yemen Standard Time)

Maṣnaʽah (مصنعة) is a village in eastern Yemen. It is located in the Hadhramaut Governorate.
