= ʽUqran =

Coordinates: 15°52′N 48°34′E

`Uqran
- Interactive map of `Uqran
- Country: Yemen
- Governorate: Hadhramaut
- Time zone: UTC+3 (Yemen Standard Time)

`Uqran is a village in eastern Yemen. It is located in the Hadhramaut Governorate.
