= Husun Bin Humam =

Coordinates: 14°47′N 49°21′E

- Interactive map of Husun Bin Humam
- Country: Yemen
- Governorate: Hadhramaut
- Time zone: UTC+3 (Yemen Standard Time)

Husun Bin Humam is a village in eastern Yemen. It is located in the Hadhramaut Governorate.
