= Yuwan =

Village in Hadhramaut Governorate, Yemen

Coordinates: 14°38′N 48°28′E

- Interactive map of Yuwan
- Country: Yemen
- Governorate: Hadhramaut Governorate
- Time zone: UTC+3 (Yemen Standard Time)

Yuwan is a village in eastern Yemen. It is located in the Hadhramaut Governorate.
