= Tawlabah =

Coordinates: 15°12′N 48°24′E

- Interactive map of Tawlabah
- Country: Yemen
- Governorate: Hadhramaut
- Time zone: UTC+3 (Yemen Standard Time)

Tawlabah is a village in eastern Yemen. It is located in the Hadhramaut Governorate.
