= Daw'an district =

Daw'an District مديرية دوعن
- District
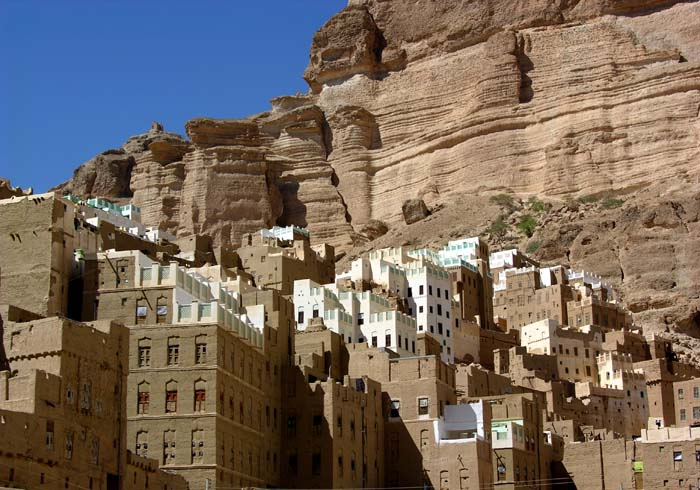
- Wadi Daw'an in Daw'an District

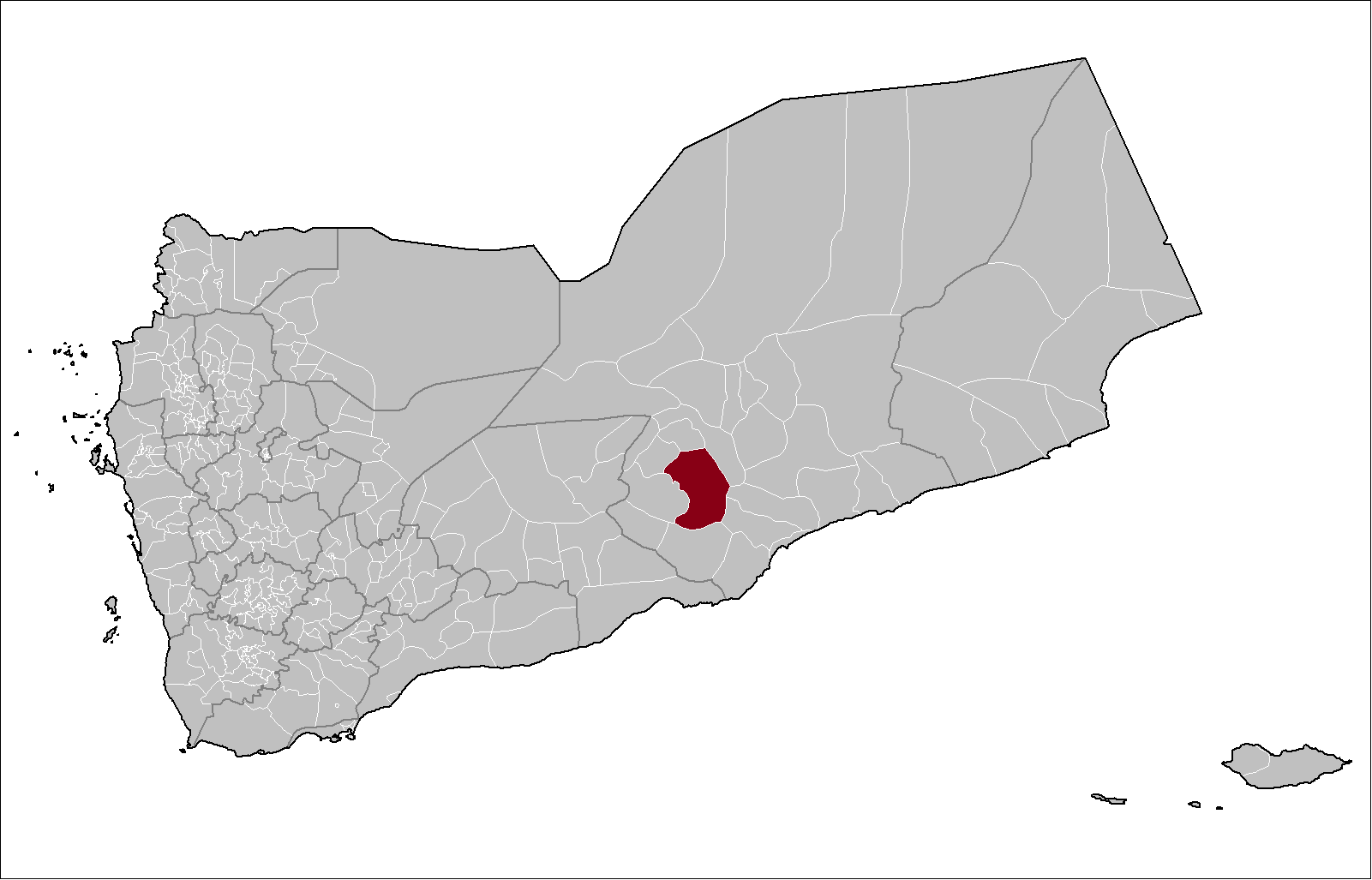
- The district highlighted in Yemen
- Coordinates: 15°10′N 48°25′E
- Country: Yemen
- Governorate: Hadhramaut

Population (2021)
  - Total: 68,774
- Time zone: UTC+3 (Yemen Standard Time)

Daw'an District (Arabic: مديرية دوعن) is a district of the Hadhramaut Governorate, Yemen. In 2021, the district had a population of 68,774.

== Villages ==
- Subaykh
- Tawlabah
