= Al-Jidfirah =

- Country: Yemen
- Governorate: Hadhramaut
- Time zone: UTC+3 (Yemen Standard Time)

Al-Jidfirah is a village in east-central Yemen. It is located in the Hadhramaut Governorate.
