= Zukaykah =

Coordinates: 15°53′N 48°27′E

- Interactive map of Zukaykah
- Country: Yemen
- Governorate: Hadhramaut
- Time zone: UTC+3 (Yemen Standard Time)

Zukaykah is a village in eastern Yemen. It is located in the Hadhramaut Governorate.
