= Jarif =

- Location in Yemen
- Coordinates: 15°14′44″N 48°21′10″E
- Country: Yemen
- Governorate: Hadhramaut
- Time zone: UTC+3 (Yemen Standard Time)

Jarif is a village in eastern Yemen. It is located in the Hadhramaut Governorate.
