= Al-Mukhtabi'Ah =

Al-Mukhtabi'Ah المختبئة
- Location in Yemen
- Coordinates: 14°46′N 49°21′E
- Country: Yemen
- Governorate: Hadhramaut Governorate
- Time zone: UTC+3 (Yemen Standard Time)

Al-Mukhtabi'ah (Arabic: المختبئة, lit. 'the hidden place') is a village in eastern Yemen. It is located in the Hadhramaut Governorate.
