= Ad Dirah =

- Location in Yemen
- Coordinates: 16°04′53″N 49°07′20″E
- Country: Yemen
- Governorate: Hadhramaut
- Time zone: UTC+3 (Yemen Standard Time)

Ad Dirah is a village in east-central Yemen. It is located in the Hadhramaut Governorate.
