= Husun As Sufayra' =

Coordinates: 16°08′23.0″N 49°09′35.6″E

- Interactive map of Husun As Sufayra'
- Country: Yemen
- Governorate: Hadhramaut
- Time zone: UTC+3 (Yemen Standard Time)

Husun As Sufayra' is a village in eastern Yemen. It is located in the Hadhramaut Governorate.
