= Al-Khirbah =

Coordinates: 14°31′N 48°58′E

- Interactive map of Al-Khirbah
- Country: Yemen
- Governorate: Hadhramaut Governorate
- Time zone: UTC+3 (Yemen Standard Time)

Al-Khirbah is a village in east-central Yemen. It is located in the Hadhramaut Governorate.
