= ʽAyn Barad =

Coordinates: 14°29′N 48°08′E

`Ayn Barad
- Interactive map of `Ayn Barad
- Country: Yemen
- Governorate: Hadhramaut
- Time zone: UTC+3 (Yemen Standard Time)

`Ayn Barad is a village in eastern Yemen. It is located in the Hadhramaut Governorate.
