= Jarshah =

Coordinates: 15°33′N 48°01′E

- Interactive map of Jarshah
- Country: Yemen
- Governorate: Hadhramaut
- Time zone: UTC+3 (Yemen Standard Time)

Jarshah is a village in eastern Yemen. It is located in the Hadhramaut Governorate.
