= Labah =

Coordinates: 15°24′N 48°22′E

- Interactive map of Labah
- Country: Yemen
- Governorate: Hadhramaut
- Time zone: UTC+3 (Yemen Standard Time)

Labah is a village in eastern Yemen. It is located in the Hadhramaut Governorate.
