= As Sadarah =

Coordinates: 14°30′N 48°05′E

- Interactive map of As Sadarah
- Country: Yemen
- Governorate: Hadhramaut
- Time zone: UTC+3 (Yemen Standard Time)

As Sadarah is a village in eastern Yemen. It is located in the Hadhramaut Governorate.
