= Masnaʽat al-Qaʽ =

Coordinates: 15°33′N 48°36′E

- Interactive map of Masnaʽat al-Qaʽ
- Country: Yemen
- Governorate: Hadhramaut
- Time zone: UTC+3 (Yemen Standard Time)

Masnaʽat al-Qaʽ is a village in eastern Yemen. It is located in the Hadhramaut Governorate.
