= Al-Bayda', Hadhramaut =

Al-Bayda'
- Country: Yemen
- Governorate: Hadhramaut Governorate
- Time zone: UTC+3 (Yemen Standard Time)

Al-Bayda' is a village in eastern Yemen. It is located in the Hadhramaut Governorate.
