= Ar Rabwah =

Coordinates: 15°52′N 49°01′E

- Interactive map of Ar Rabwah
- Country: Yemen
- Governorate: Hadhramaut
- Time zone: UTC+3 (Yemen Standard Time)

Ar Rabwah is a village in eastern Yemen. It is located in the Hadhramaut Governorate.
