= Ar Rujaydah =

Coordinates: 16°01′N 48°51′E

- Interactive map of Ar Rujaydah
- Country: Yemen
- Governorate: Hadhramaut Governorate
- Time zone: UTC+3 (Yemen Standard Time)

Ar Rujaydah is a village in eastern Yemen. It is located in the Hadhramaut Governorate.
