= Lahmas =

Coordinates: 15°42′N 48°15′E

- Interactive map of Lahmas
- Country: Yemen
- Governorate: Hadhramaut
- Time zone: UTC+3 (Yemen Standard Time)

Lahmas is a village in eastern Yemen. It is located in the Hadhramaut Governorate.
