= Rijlat al-ʽIjlah =

Coordinates: 15°37′N 48°22′E

- Interactive map of Rijlat al-ʽIjlah
- Country: Yemen
- Governorate: Hadhramaut
- Time zone: UTC+3 (Yemen Standard Time)

Rijlat al-ʽIjlah is a village in eastern Yemen. It is located in the Hadhramaut Governorate.
