= An-Nuʽayr =

Coordinates: 15°20′N 48°00′E

- Interactive map of An-Nuʽayr
- Country: Yemen
- Governorate: Hadhramaut Governorate
- Time zone: UTC+3 (Yemen Standard Time)

An-Nuʽayr (Al-Nuʽair) is a village in eastern Yemen. It is located in the Hadhramaut Governorate.
