= Jidfaʽah =

Coordinates: 15°52′N 48°40′E

- Interactive map of Jidfaʽah
- Country: Yemen
- Governorate: Hadhramaut Governorate
- Time zone: UTC+3 (Yemen Standard Time)

Jidfaʽah is a village in eastern Yemen. It is located in the Hadhramaut Governorate.
