= Khudaysh =

Coordinates: 15°16′N 48°19′E

- Interactive map of Khudaysh
- Country: Yemen
- Governorate: Hadhramaut
- Time zone: UTC+3 (Yemen Standard Time)

Khudaysh is a village in eastern Yemen. It is located in the Hadhramaut Governorate.
