= Mawla Matar =

Coordinates: 14°46′N 48°48′E

- Interactive map of Mawla Matar
- Country: Yemen
- Governorate: Hadhramaut
- Time zone: UTC+3 (Yemen Standard Time)

Mawla Matar is a village in eastern Yemen. It is located in the Hadhramaut Governorate.
