= Lahrum =

Coordinates: 15°41′N 48°13′E

- Interactive map of Lahrum
- Country: Yemen
- Governorate: Hadhramaut
- Time zone: UTC+3 (Yemen Standard Time)

Lahrum is a village in eastern Yemen. It is located in the Hadhramaut Governorate.
