= Al-Buhayrah, Hadhramaut =

Al-Buhayrah
- Country: Yemen
- Governorate: Hadhramaut Governorate
- Time zone: UTC+3 (Yemen Standard Time)

Al-Buhayrah is a village in eastern Yemen. It is located in the Hadhramaut Governorate.
