= Ba Hudhayl =

- Country: Yemen
- Governorate: Hadhramaut
- Time zone: UTC+3 (Yemen Standard Time)

Ba Hudhayl is a village in eastern Yemen. It is located in the Hadhramaut Governorate.
