= Ba Hafar =

Coordinates: 16°08′N 49°12′E

- Interactive map of Ba Hafar
- Country: Yemen
- Governorate: Hadhramaut
- Time zone: UTC+3 (Yemen Standard Time)

Ba Hafar is a village in eastern Yemen. It is located in the Hadhramaut Governorate and sits at 2509 feet above sea level.
