= Ash Shajar =

Coordinates: 14°42′N 49°20′E

- Interactive map of Ash Shajar
- Country: Yemen
- Governorate: Hadhramaut
- Time zone: UTC+3 (Yemen Standard Time)

Ash Shajar is a village in eastern Yemen. It is located in the Hadhramaut Governorate. The name means "The trees" in Arabic.
