= Findah =

Coordinates: 15°50′N 48°17′E

- Interactive map of Findah
- Country: Yemen
- Governorate: Hadhramaut Governorate
- Time zone: UTC+3 (Yemen Standard Time)

Findah is a village in eastern Yemen. It is located in the Hadhramaut Governorate.
