= Juwat al-al-Muhanna =

Coordinates: 15°50′N 48°22′E

- Interactive map of Juwat al-al-Muhanna
- Country: Yemen
- Governorate: Hadhramaut
- Time zone: UTC+3 (Yemen Standard Time)

Juwat al-al-Muhanna is a village in eastern Yemen. It is located in the Hadhramaut Governorate.
