= Khabarah =

- Location in Yemen
- Coordinates: 14°22′N 48°23′E
- Country: Yemen
- Governorate: Hadhramaut
- Time zone: UTC+3 (Yemen Standard Time)

Khabarah is a village in eastern Yemen. It is located in the Hadhramaut Governorate.
