= Qusayʽir =

Coordinates: 14°56′N 50°20′E

- Interactive map of Qusayʽir
- Country: Yemen
- Governorate: Hadhramaut
- Time zone: UTC+3 (Yemen Standard Time)

Qusayʽir is a village in eastern Yemen. It is located in the Hadhramaut Governorate.
