= Ar Rukayb =

Coordinates: 14°34′N 49°13′E

- Interactive map of Ar Rukayb
- Country: Yemen
- Governorate: Hadhramaut
- Time zone: UTC+3 (Yemen Standard Time)

Ar Rukayb is a village in eastern Yemen. It is located in the Hadhramaut Governorate.
