= As Simah =

Coordinates: 15°30′N 48°25′E

- Interactive map of As Simah
- Country: Yemen
- Governorate: Hadhramaut
- Time zone: UTC+3 (Yemen Standard Time)

As Simah is a village in eastern Yemen. It is located in the Hadhramaut Governorate.
