= Al-Mawsaf =

Coordinates: 16°05′N 48°17′E

- Interactive map of Al-Mawsaf
- Country: Yemen
- Governorate: Hadhramaut
- Time zone: UTC+3 (Yemen Standard Time)

Al-Mawsaf is a village in eastern Yemen. It is located in the Hadhramaut Governorate.
