= Jarb al-Fiqr =

Coordinates: 15°35′N 48°12′E

- Interactive map of Jarb al-Fiqr
- Country: Yemen
- Governorate: Hadhramaut
- Time zone: UTC+3 (Yemen Standard Time)

Jarb al-Fiqr is a village in eastern Yemen. It is located in the Hadhramaut Governorate.
