= Ard Ar Raydah =

Coordinates: 15°40′N 48°52′E

- Interactive map of Ard Ar Raydah
- Country: Yemen
- Governorate: Hadhramaut Governorate
- Time zone: UTC+3 (Yemen Standard Time)

Ard Ar Raydah is a village in eastern Yemen. It is located in the Hadhramaut Governorate.
