= Sharj al-Bin Salim =

Coordinates: 15°34′N 48°13′E

- Interactive map of Sharj al-Bin Salim
- Country: Yemen
- Governorate: Hadhramaut
- Time zone: UTC+3 (Yemen Standard Time)

Sharj al-Bin Salim is a village in eastern Yemen. It is located in the Hadhramaut Governorate.
