= Al-Huraydah =

Coordinates: 15°36′N 48°11′E

- Interactive map of Al-Huraydah
- Country: Yemen
- Governorate: Hadhramaut
- Time zone: UTC+3 (Yemen Standard Time)

Al-Huraydah is a village in east-central Yemen. It is located in the Hadhramaut Governorate.
