= Hadbat as-Suqʽan =

Coordinates: 16°03′N 48°19′E

- Interactive map of Hadbat as-Suqʽan
- Country: Yemen
- Governorate: Hadhramaut
- Time zone: UTC+3 (Yemen Standard Time)

Hadbat as-Suqʽan is a village in eastern Yemen. It is located in the Hadhramaut Governorate.
