= Libnat Ba Rushayd =

Coordinates: 14°47′N 48°19′E

- Interactive map of Libnat Ba Rushayd
- Country: Yemen
- Governorate: Hadhramaut
- Time zone: UTC+3 (Yemen Standard Time)

Libnat Ba Rushayd is a village in eastern Yemen. It is located in the Hadhramaut Governorate.
