= As Sufal =

- Interactive map of As Sufal
- Coordinates: 14°06′48″N 48°42′27″E
- Country: Yemen
- Governorate: Hadhramaut
- Time zone: UTC+3 (Yemen Standard Time)

As Sufal is a village in eastern Yemen. It is located in the Hadhramaut Governorate.
