= Buwaysh =

Coordinates: 14°35′N 49°13′E

- Interactive map of Buwaysh
- Country: Yemen
- Governorate: Hadhramaut
- Time zone: UTC+3 (Yemen Standard Time)

Buwaysh is a village in eastern Yemen. It is located in the Hadhramaut Governorate.
