= Mahmidah =

Coordinates: 14°28′N 48°27′E

- Interactive map of Mahmidah
- Country: Yemen
- Governorate: Hadhramaut Governorate
- Time zone: UTC+3 (Yemen Standard Time)

Mahmidah is a village in eastern Yemen. It is located in the Hadhramaut Governorate.
