= Taris, Yemen =

Coordinates: 15°56′N 48°45′E

- Interactive map of Taris, Yemen
- Country: Yemen
- Governorate: Hadhramaut
- Time zone: UTC+3 (Yemen Standard Time)

Taris, Yemen is a village in eastern Yemen. It is located in the Hadhramaut Governorate.
