= Miʽyan al-Masajid =

- Interactive map of Miʽyan al-Masajid
- Country: Yemen
- Governorate: Hadhramaut
- Time zone: UTC+3 (Yemen Standard Time)

Miʽyan al-Masajid is a village in eastern Yemen. It is located in the Hadhramaut Governorate.
