= Hadun =

Coordinates: 15°09′N 48°20′E

- Interactive map of Hadun
- Country: Yemen
- Governorate: Hadhramaut
- Time zone: UTC+3 (Yemen Standard Time)

Hadun is a village in eastern Yemen. It is located in the Hadhramaut Governorate.
