= Nafhun =

Coordinates: 15°29′N 48°03′E

- Interactive map of Nafhun
- Country: Yemen
- Governorate: Hadhramaut
- Time zone: UTC+3 (Yemen Standard Time)

Nafhun is a village in eastern Yemen. It is located in the Hadhramaut Governorate.
