= Abu Diyan =

- Location in Yemen
- Coordinates: 15°50′04″N 48°40′03″E
- Country: Yemen
- Governorate: Hadhramaut
- Time zone: UTC+3 (Yemen Standard Time)

Abu Diyan is a village in east-central Yemen. It is located in the Hadhramaut Governorate.
