= Mudhaynib =

Coordinates: 14°37′N 48°48′E

- Interactive map of Mudhaynib
- Country: Yemen
- Governorate: Hadhramaut
- Time zone: UTC+3 (Yemen Standard Time)

Mudhaynib is a village in eastern Yemen. It is located in the Hadhramaut Governorate.
