= Husun As Salasil =

Coordinates: 16°29′N 48°50′E

- Interactive map of Husun As Salasil
- Country: Yemen
- Governorate: Hadhramaut
- Time zone: UTC+3 (Yemen Standard Time)

Husun As Salasil A small village in the middle of Wadi Jabba, the land of Al Awamer, east of Yemen. It is located in the Hadhramaut Governorate.
