= Khubayah =

Coordinates: 16°02′N 49°02′E

- Interactive map of Khubayah
- Country: Yemen
- Governorate: Hadhramaut
- Time zone: UTC+3 (Yemen Standard Time)

Khubayah is a village in eastern Yemen. It is located in the Hadhramaut Governorate.
