= As Suwayri =

Coordinates: 15°59′N 49°01′E

- Interactive map of As Suwayri
- Country: Yemen
- Governorate: Hadhramaut
- Time zone: UTC+3 (Yemen Standard Time)

As Suwayri is a village in eastern Yemen. It is located in the Hadhramaut Governorate.
