= Anqorah =

Coordinates: 15°35′N 48°52′E

- Interactive map of Anqorah
- Country: Yemen
- Governorate: Hadhramaut
- Time zone: UTC+3 (Yemen Standard Time)

Anqorah is a village in eastern Yemen. It is located in the Hadhramaut Governorate.
