= Al-Huwaylah =

Coordinates: 15°29′N 48°20′E

- Interactive map of Al-Huwaylah
- Country: Yemen
- Governorate: Hadhramaut
- Time zone: UTC+3 (Yemen Standard Time)

Al-Huwaylah is a village in east-central Yemen. It is located in the Hadhramaut Governorate.
