= ʽArd ʽAbd'Allah =

Coordinates: 16°02′N 48°53′E

`Ard `Abd Allah
- Interactive map of `Ard `Abd Allah
- Country: Yemen
- Governorate: Hadhramaut
- Time zone: UTC+3 (Yemen Standard Time)

`Ard `Abd Allah is a village in eastern Yemen. It is located in the Hadhramaut Governorate.
