= Ghurib =

Coordinates: 15°25′N 48°28′E

- Interactive map of Ghurib
- Country: Yemen
- Governorate: Hadhramaut
- Time zone: UTC+3 (Yemen Standard Time)

Ghurib is a village in eastern Yemen. It is located in the Hadhramaut Governorate.
