= Al-ʽAsila =

- Country: Yemen
- Governorate: Hadhramaut Governorate
- Time zone: UTC+3 (Yemen Standard Time)

Al-ʽAsila (العسیلا) is a village in eastern Yemen. It is located in the Hadhramaut Governorate.
