= Al Qaf district =

Al Qaf District
- District
- Location in Yemen
- Coordinates: 17°00′N 49°10′E
- Country: Yemen
- Governorate: Hadhramaut

Population (2021)
  - Total: 3,384
- Time zone: UTC+3 (Yemen Standard Time)

Al Qaf District is a district of the Hadhramaut Governorate, Yemen. As of 2003, the district had a population of 3,384 inhabitants.
