= Al-ʽUqaymah =

Coordinates: 14°29′N 48°14′E

- Interactive map of Al-ʽUqaymah
- Country: Yemen
- Governorate: Hadhramaut Governorate
- Time zone: UTC+3 (Yemen Standard Time)

Al-ʽUqaymah is a village in eastern Yemen. It is located in the Hadhramaut Governorate.
