= Bayt Qishn =

Coordinates: 15°52′N 48°16′E

- Interactive map of Bayt Qishn
- Country: Yemen
- Governorate: Hadhramaut
- Time zone: UTC+3 (Yemen Standard Time)

Bayt Qishn is a village in eastern Yemen. It is located in the Hadhramaut Governorate.
