= Hawtat As Sadah =

- Location in Yemen
- Coordinates: 15°54′N 48°40′E
- Country: Yemen
- Governorate: Hadhramaut
- Time zone: UTC+3 (Yemen Standard Time)

Hawtat As Sadah is a village in eastern Yemen. It is located in the Hadhramaut Governorate, just southeast of Shibam.
