= Sarar, Yemen =

Coordinates: 15°01′N 50°25′E

Sarar, Yemen منطقة سرار مديرية الريدة وقصيعر حضرموت
- Interactive map of Sarar, Yemen
- Country: Yemen
- Governorate: Hadhramaut
- Time zone: UTC+3 (Yemen Standard Time)

Sarar, Yemen is a village in eastern Yemen. It is located in the Hadhramaut Governorate.
