= ʽUrum =

Coordinates: 14°57′N 48°09′E

`Urum
- Interactive map of `Urum
- Country: Yemen
- Governorate: Hadhramaut
- Time zone: UTC+3 (Yemen Standard Time)

`Urum is a village in eastern Yemen. It is located in the Hadhramaut Governorate.
