= Al-Wulayjat =

- Country: Yemen
- Governorate: Hadhramaut
- Time zone: UTC+3 (Yemen Standard Time)

Al-Wulayjat is a village in east-central Yemen. It is located in the Hadhramaut Governorate.
