= Qarʽan =

Coordinates: 15.6736°N 48.2986°E

- Interactive map of Qarʽan
- Country: Yemen
- Governorate: Hadhramaut
- Time zone: UTC+3 (Yemen Standard Time)

Qarʽan is a village in eastern Yemen. It is located in the Hadhramaut Governorate.
