= Fuwah =

Coordinates: 14°29′N 49°02′E

- Interactive map of Fuwah
- Country: Yemen
- Governorate: Hadhramaut
- Time zone: UTC+3 (Yemen Standard Time)

Fuwah is a village in eastern Yemen. It is located in the Hadhramaut Governorate.
