= Manawirah =

Coordinates: 14°33′N 49°07′E

- Interactive map of Manawirah
- Country: Yemen
- Governorate: Hadhramaut
- Time zone: UTC+3 (Yemen Standard Time)

Manawirah is a village in eastern Yemen. It is located in the Hadhramaut Governorate.
