= Al-Buqayrayn =

Coordinates: 14°33′N 49°08′E

- Interactive map of Al-Buqayrayn
- Country: Yemen
- Governorate: Hadhramaut
- Time zone: UTC+3 (Yemen Standard Time)

Al-Buqayrayn is a village in eastern Yemen. It is located in the Hadhramaut Governorate.
