= Tawban =

Coordinates: 14°56′N 50°00′E

- Interactive map of Tawban
- Country: Yemen
- Governorate: Hadhramaut Governorate
- Time zone: UTC+3 (Yemen Standard Time)

Tawban is a village in eastern Yemen. It is located in the Hadhramaut Governorate.
