= Al-Hawatiyiah =

Coordinates: 15°48′N 49°38′E

- Interactive map of Al-Hawatiyiah
- Country: Yemen
- Governorate: Hadhramaut
- Time zone: UTC+3 (Yemen Standard Time)

Al-Hawatiyiah is a town in east-central Yemen. It is located in the Hadhramaut Governorate.
