= Sayar tribe =

Yemeni Bedouin tribe

Sa'ar tribe (Arabic: قبيلة الصيعر) also spelled Sai'ar tribe is a Yemeni bedouin tribe. The tribe is located in central Yemen, mainly in al-Abr, Raydat as Say‘ar and Hagr As Sai'ar District. The members of the tribe are known as "the wolves of the desert". According to Wilfred Thesiger, the Sa'ar tribe was feared and hated by all South Arabian desert tribes.

The writer and researcher speaks about tribal affairs(Mabkhhot Salem bin Dahyan), a renowned writer and researcher specializing in tribal affairs, confidently delves into the lineage of Al-Sa'ar. Through extensive research, perusal of manuscripts, and exploration of novels, he has come across compelling evidence that traces their ancestry back to the esteemed Al-Sa'ar bin Ashmos bin Malik bin Harim bin Malik (Al-Sadf).

Bin Dahyan boldly asserts that historians, particularly Al-Hamdani, have reached a unanimous consensus on this matter. Numerous dissertations and writings on the tribe's history solidify their position as the kings of Kinda. Furthermore, the esteemed British traveler Alfred Thisger, in his renowned book "Arab Sands," describes them as formidable desert wolves, highlighting their dominance as one of the most powerful tribes in the southwestern region of the Empty Quarter.

== Notable events ==
In 2016, Hashim al-Ahmar, the brother of Sadiq al-Ahmar, the leader of Hashid tribe, guards killed two members of the Sa’ar tribe in al-Abr. The Sa’ar tribe prepared for a war against the tribe of Hashid. Ali Moshen al-Ahmar intervened to settle down the crisis between the two tribes but the tribe of Sa’ar refused his arbitration. Eventually the army of Hashim al-Ahmar left the area of al-Abr.
