= Al Qatn district =

Al Qatn District مديرية القطن
- District
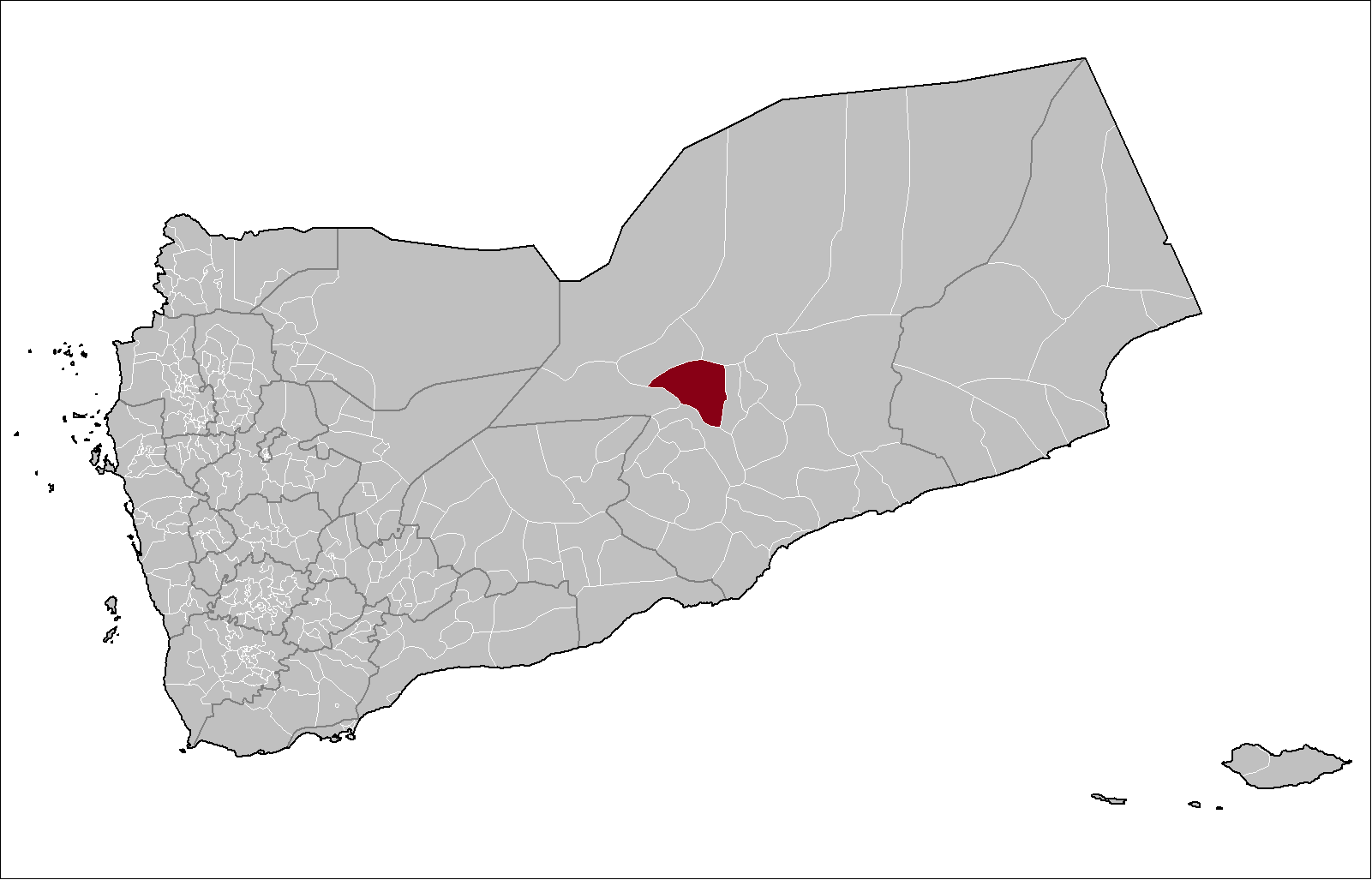
- The district highlighted in Yemen
- Coordinates: 16°00′N 48°30′E
- Country: Yemen
- Governorate: Hadhramaut

Population (2021)
  - Total: 100,393
- Time zone: UTC+3 (Yemen Standard Time)

Al Qatn District is a district of the Hadhramaut Governorate, Yemen. As of 2021, the district had a population of 100,393 inhabitants.
