= Al-Kharabah, Hadhramaut =

Al-Kharabah
- Country: Yemen
- Governorate: Hadhramaut Governorate
- Time zone: UTC+3 (Yemen Standard Time)

Al-Kharabah is a village in east-central Yemen. It is located in the Hadhramaut Governorate.
