= Amina Al Adwan =

Jordanian writer, poet, and critic

- Born: 1944 (age 81–82); Jordan
- Education: American University in Cairo; Ain Shams University
- Occupations: Writer; critic

Amina Al Adwan (Arabic: أمينة العدوان) is a Jordanian writer, poet, and critic. She is one of the founders of the Jordanian Writers Association. She worked for the Ministry of Culture and was editor-in-chief of Afkar magazine, Swt Algeel magazine, and Funoon magazine. She participated in the Jordanian women's movement being a former Jordanian Women's Union member.

== Education ==
Amina Al Adwan was born in Amman, Jordan. She studied at Ain Shams University in Egypt and received a Bachelor of Arts in philosophy in 1970. A year later, she received a Diploma in Literary Criticism from the American University in Cairo. After graduating she worked at the Ministry of Culture as editor-in-chief of several Arabic magazines, including Afkar magazine, Swt Algeel magazine, and Funoon magazine from 1971 until 1982. She published forty-eight poetry works throughout her career. This is in addition to writing articles on contemporary Arabic literature and novel, and the literary and critical studies she did on contemporary Jordanian literature.

== Works ==
=== Literary works ===
Some of her literary works throughout her career:

- A Home with No Walls (1982)
- In Front of The Barrier (1983)
- Metallic Rooms of Baptism (1985)
- Loss of Weight (1986)
- Rebellious Voices (1986)
- Arab Faces (1991)
- Death Sentences (original: Aḥkām al-iʻdām)
- Mustafa Sa’d (1993)
- Bitter Coffee (original: Qahwah murrah) (2003)
- The Destroyed Wall (original: al-Sūr al-mahdūm) (2004)
- His Blood is Not Blue (original: Damuhu laysa azraq)
- Red Blood Cells (original: Kurayyāt dam ḥamrāʼ)
- Black Smoke (original: Dukhān aswad)
- Blood Circuits (original: Dawāʼir al-dam)
- A Pill (original: Ḥabbat dawāʼ)

=== Books ===
Some of the books she wrote during her career:

- Studies in Contemporary Jordanian Literature (1976)
- Articles on Contemporary Arabic Novels (1976)
- Critical Readings
- Critical Readings of Amina Al Adwan's Works

=== Poetry collections in English ===
- Rebellious Voices
- Arab Faces
