= Al-Qaʽudah =

Coordinates: 15°46′N 48°16′E

Qaʽudah
- Interactive map of Qaʽudah
- Country: Yemen
- Governorate: Hadhramaut Governorate
- Time zone: UTC+3 (Yemen Standard Time)

Qaʽudah (القعوده) is a village in eastern Yemen. It is located in the Hadhramaut Governorate.
