= Maryamah =

Coordinates: 15°58′N 48°50′E

- Interactive map of Maryamah
- Country: Yemen
- Governorate: Hadhramaut
- Time zone: UTC+3 (Yemen Standard Time)

Maryamah is a village in eastern Yemen. It is located in the Hadhramaut Governorate.
