= Mukalla rural district =

Mukalla Rural District مديرية أرياف المكلا
- District
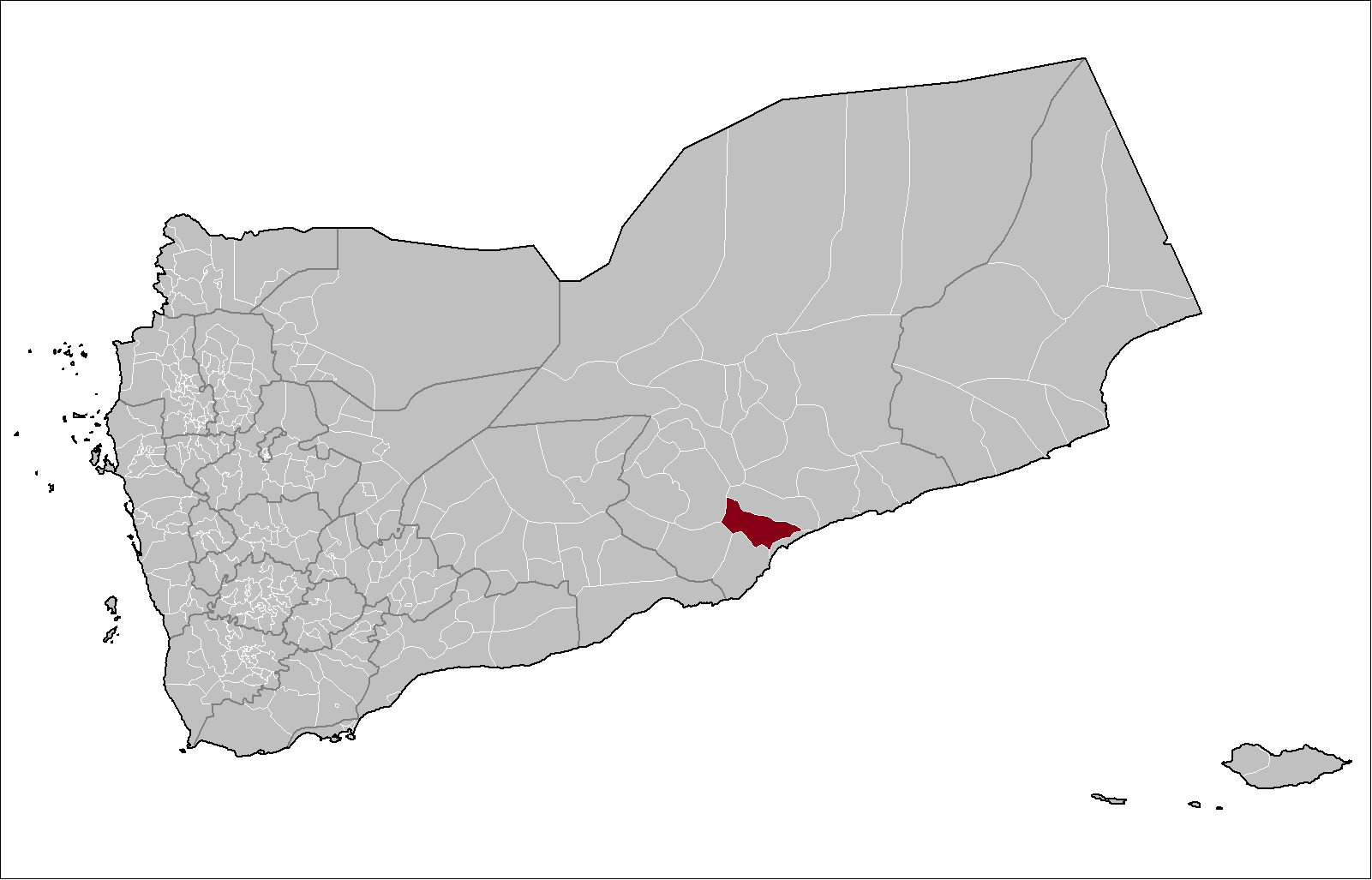
- The district highlighted in Yemen
- Coordinates: 14°50′N 48°50′E
- Country: Yemen
- Governorate: Hadhramaut

Population (2021)
  - Total: 25,608
- Time zone: UTC+3 (Yemen Standard Time)

Mukalla Rural District (Arabic: مديرية أرياف المكلا) is a district of the Hadhramaut Governorate, Yemen. As of 2021, the district had a population of 25,608 inhabitants.

== See also ==
- Mukalla
