= Qarn Bin ʽAdwan =

Coordinates: 15°34′N 48°04′E

- Interactive map of Qarn Bin ʽAdwan
- Country: Yemen
- Governorate: Hadhramaut
- Time zone: UTC+3 (Yemen Standard Time)

Qarn Bin ʽAdwan is a village in eastern Yemen. It is located in the Hadhramaut Governorate.
