= Shiʽb an-Nur =

Coordinates: 14°57′N 49°30′E

- Interactive map of Shiʽb an-Nur
- Country: Yemen
- Governorate: Hadhramaut Governorate
- Time zone: UTC+3 (Yemen Standard Time)

Shiʽb an-Nur is a village in eastern Yemen. It is located in the Hadhramaut Governorate.
