= Nimr ibn Adwan =

Nimr bin Adwan
- نمر بن عدوان
- Born: Nimr bin Qablan bin Nimr bin Hamdan bin Adwan bin Fayez; 1745 AD; Jordan
- Died: 1823 AD; Jordan, Yajouz
- Burial place: Yajouz
- Citizenship: Ottoman Empire
- Education: Al-Azhar University
- Occupations: Poet and Tribal Sheikh
- Known for: Horsemanship, poetry
- Spouse(s): Wadha bint Falah Al-Sbaila, Watfa bint Falah Al-Sbaila, Al-Jaziya Al-Sakhriya, Seeta Al-Sharariya
- Children: Oqab, Sulatan, Sara, and others

Nimr bin 'Adwan or Nimr Al-Adwan (Arabic: نمر بن عدوان, romanized: nimer ɪbn ɪdˈwan, lit. 'Nimer, son of Adwan', 1735–1823) was a prominent Bedouin poet, chieftain, and a famous knight from Jordan. He is celebrated for his poetry, which combines themes of love, loss, and tribal pride. His life story and poetry have earned him a lasting place in Arab folklore, particularly in Jordan and the Levant.

Nicknamed Abu Oqab (Arabic: أبو عقاب), his full name was Nimr bin Qablan bin Nimr bin Hamdan bin Adwan bin Fayez bin Hammoud bin Shaheel bin Fawaz bin Hammoud bin Adwan Al-Adwan Al-Zafiri (Arabic: نمر بن قبلان بن نمر بن حمدان بن عدوان بن فايز بن حمود بن شهيل بن فواز بن حمود بن عدوان العدوان الظفيري). He was renowned for his nobility, generosity, and commendable traits.Nimr was a sheik of the Adwan tribe of central Jordan, one of the leading tribes of the Balqa government until his death in 1823.

== Personal life ==
=== Family and Upbringing ===
Nimr Al-Adwan was born in Balqa region of present-day Jordan in the early 18th century, most of historians said in 1745. He was born in the encampments of the Adwan tribe. He was raised by his uncle, Barakat, after his father’s death; his uncle later married his mother, and he was mistakenly attributed to his uncle. It is noted that his birth name was Abdul Aziz (Arabic: عبد العزيز), which later changed to Nimr. A French tourist who visited the region at the time played a role in educating Nimr Al-Adwan in Jerusalem as she admired his character. He spent five years studying in Jerusalem’s schools. He then spent approximately six years at Al-Azhar when it was a non-formal university. Researchers estimate his age upon returning to his tribe to be 18 years. Nimr played a significant role in consolidating the Adwan authority in Balqa, notably in the Marj Abu Aisha incident near Hisban. He remained the absolute leader of Balqa until he abdicated leadership to his cousin Hamoud bin Saleh Al-Adwan.

He married Wadha bint Falah Al-Sbaila (Arabic: وضحا بنت فلاح السبيلة), whom he loved deeply. His marriage to Wadha initially caused discontent among his tribe, as she was from outside the tribe and belonged to the Bani Sakher tribe, which was not part of the Adwan alliance. The Adwan alliance included the tribes of Balqa and Salt, while the opposing side included the tribes of Bani Sakher and Al-Abbad. Both alliances competed for influence in Balqa and central Jordan during that era.

The disputes between Nimr Al-Adwan and his cousin Hamoud Al-Adwan eventually led Nimr to leave his tribe. He initially sought refuge with Ibn Mallak, the sheikh of the Al-Saqr tribe in Ghor Beisan, and later moved to the Bani Sakhr tribe under the protection of its sheikh, Awad Al-Mouh (Arabic: عواد الموح). After the Adwan tribe faced defeats at the hands of the Khreisha clan from Bani Sakhr, Hamoud Al-Adwan sought the help of his nephew Nimr, who returned to restore the Adwan's authority over Balqa. Hamoud sought Nimr's assistance through a poem beginning with:

يا (نمر) لا تبعد ترى حظنا انهاض
الديرة صارت ملك للي وليها

Translation:

O Nimer, do not stray, for our luck has fallen low,
The land now belongs to those who let it grow

Nimr replied with a poem starting with:

رسمك لفى يا (احْمود) مع طارشٍ فاض
قرطاستك يا صاحبي العلم بيها

Translation:

Your sketch, Hmoud, you cast it with one who hears not a sound,
While your parchment, my friend, in wisdom is profound

=== The death of Wadha ===
Wadha died around 1783 due to cholera while Nimr was traveling to Jerusalem and Nablus on some business. It was the turning point in Nimr's life, which plunged him into grief. His poems from this period express raw emotion, sorrow, and a longing for her presence. One of his most famous lines translates as:

"I see her image in the stars and hear her voice in the wind, yet my heart remains shattered by her absence."

In the historical context of this type of elegy will find something remarkable. The value of women in that era was neither small nor nonexistent. Men did not respect their wives, but Nimr loved his wife and praised many aspects of her. There was a rebellion Nimr expressed when he fell in love with his wife during her life and then lamented her in death, describing her with lines like:

'O sweet scent of musk, the fragrance of her body,' or his verse:

لاطلع على المرقاب وأشرف على الدان
وادور بالدنيا واوصف مصابي
عاللي لاعتدل عدلة الزان
سود الجدايل وشوشن للتراب

Translation:

I will climb the watchtower and will gaze upon the valley,
And I'll roam the world describing my sorrow,
For the one whose straightness resembled the fine tamarisk,
Her black braids swaying to the dust

And much more, scattered throughout his poems, which people have memorized and continue to circulate to this day.

=== Other marriages ===
Nimr married three women after Wadha's death. The first was Watfa (Arabic: وطفا), Wadha's sister, whom he later divorced. He then married Seeta Al-Shararat (Arabic: صيتة الشرارات), but she tried to take Wadha's place in his heart, which led him to separate from her without divorcing her, continuing to care for her and her child. His last wife, whom he outlived, was Al-Jaziya Bani Sakhr (Arabic: الجازية بني صخر). Nimr died at the age of 78 in 1823, and he was buried in Yajouz.

== Poetry ==
Interest in Nimr Al-Adwan's poetry dates back to earlier times. The consul of Prussia in Damascus, Mr. Cessitin, translated one of his poems into German in 1860. The German Oriental Society published his poems translated by an American orientalist named Spoor. Additionally, Professor Settmann selected and translated four of his poems into German. An Italian priest of Spanish origin, Antoine Vergalli, also showed interest in his work. Nimr's strong emotions for his wife Wadha were the primary reason for these orientalists' fascination with his poetry.

On the Arab front, there is considerable interest in Nimr's poetry, with many authors focusing on his works. Rukhs bin Zayed Al-Uzaizi showed clear interest in Nimr's poetry and life through his books and TV series. Nimr is credited with many poems, earning him the title "Prince of Poetry" in Jordan. During that time, Jordan lacked poets composing in classical Arabic but excelled in Nabati poetry. His poetry is known for its diverse themes, including praise, love, and enthusiasm. However, elegy remains his most significant contribution, highlighting his poetic talent and personality, especially after Wadha's death. His grief sparked a flow of elegiac poetry, starting with the poem that immortalized him in the hearts of Bedouins, beginning with:

سر يا قلم في كاغدٍ لي واسرعِ
واكتب على ما اريد أن افهم واسمعِ

Translation:

Go forth, O pen, upon this parchment swiftly,
And write upon it what I wish to comprehend and hear

A famous attributed poem includes:

البارحة في هجعة النوم غرقان
وَيحٍ مِنَ الوجلا وَفرقةْ نَديِمي

Translation:

Last night, I was submerged in the depths of sleep,
Alas, from the sorrow and the separation from my companion

== In drama ==
A series depicting the poet’s life was produced under the name Nimr bin Adwan in 1976, directed by Salah Abu Hanoud. It consisted of thirteen episodes. A new version was produced in 2007 by Arab Telemedia Group and aired during Ramadan of that year. Actor Yasser Al-Masri played the lead role of Nimr bin Adwan, alongside actress Saba Mubarak as Wadha. Nimr also appeared in the series Epic of Love and Departure "The Promise", portraying the life of the knight Khalaf bin Daijaa, with actor Rouhi Al-Safadi playing his role. Additionally, a radio drama about Nimr bin Adwan, consisting of thirty episodes, aired on Jordanian Radio in 1975.

== Biographies ==
Many writers, historians, and enthusiasts of folk poetry have documented Nimr Al-Adwan’s life. Among these works is the book "Nimr Al-Adwan (Poet of Love and Loyalty, His Life and Poetry)" by Rukhs bin Zayed Al-Uzaizi.

== Legacy ==
His works were transmitted orally for generations before being written down, ensuring their preservation in Jordanian cultural memory. Today, his poems are studied as exemplars of Nabati poetry and have been adapted into songs and plays.
