= Atef Adwan =

Former Palestinian minister

Atef Ibrahim Mohammad Adwan

Minister of State for Refugee Affairs
- Incumbent
- Assumed office March 2006
- President: Mahmoud Abbas
- Prime Minister: Ismail Haniyeh

Personal details
- Born: 1952 (age 73–74) Beit Hanoun, Gaza Strip
- Occupation: Politician, Professor
- Nickname: Abu Sharif

Atef Ibrahim Mohammad Adwan (Arabic: عاطف ابراهيم محمد عدوان), also spelled Odwan, Udwan or Edwan (nom de Guerre Abu Sharif), is the Minister of Refugees in the Palestinian Authority, having been named to this position following the Hamas victory in the 2006 Palestinian legislative election, when he was elected from the Northern Gaza District.

Adwan was born in 1952 in the town of Beit Hanoun, in the far north of the Gaza Strip, where he still resides, to a well-educated family. He earned a higher diploma in political science in Lebanon, probably in the early 1970s, a bachelor's degree in political science from the College of Economics and Political Sciences in Cairo in 1978, followed by a graduate diploma from the Center for Arab Research and Studies at the Beirut Arab University, and master's and a PhD from British universities between 1983 and 1987. He became an associate professor in 1996 and a professor in political science in 2001 at the Islamic University of Gaza in Gaza City.

In addition to his political posts, he is acting chairman of the Islamic Society in Beit Hanoun, preaches weekly at the Omar Bin Abed Al-Aziz mosque, and has published books and research papers on political issues such as the relationships between the Jews and the Muslims in the early stages of Islam.

Adwan has been arrested several times by the Israeli government for alleged terrorist activities and the PLO-led Palestinian Authority for political activism through the years. In 1992 he was deported to Marj Al-Zuhour in Southern Lebanon/

He was the Minister of State for Refugee affairs in Palestinian Authority Government of March 2006.

== External sources ==
- Washington Institute PLC Handbook
