= Adh Dhlia'ah district =

- District
- Interactive map of Adh Dhlia'ah district
- Coordinates: 15°10′N 48°05′E
- Country: Yemen
- Governorate: Hadhramaut

Population (2021)
  - Total: 28,678
- Time zone: UTC+3 (Yemen Standard Time)

Adh Dhlia'ah district is a district of the Hadhramaut Governorate, Yemen. As of 2021, the district had a population of 28,678 inhabitants.
