= Imad Al-Adwan =

Jordanian politician (born 1988)

Imad Al-Adwan (Arabic: عماد العدوان, born 1988 in Balqa Governorate) is a Jordanian politician who is a member of the Parliament of Jordan.

== Political career ==
In the 2020 Jordanian general election, he was elected to Parliament becoming one of the youngest MPs.

== Arrest ==
In April 2023, he was arrested by Israeli police accused of smuggling gold and weapons into the West Bank. He was arrested at the King Hussein Bridge, five kilometres east of Jericho. On 7 May, Al-Adwan was released by Israeli authorities into the custody of Jordan for further investigation. On 17 May Al-Adwan was charged, and on September 20, 2024 he was sentenced to ten years of hard labour.
