= Al-Shihr district =

Al-Shihr District مديرية الشحر
- District
- Interactive map of Al-Shihr District
- Coordinates: 15°00′N 49°30′E
- Country: Yemen
- Governorate: Hadhramaut Governorate

Population (2021)
  - Total: 116,088
- Time zone: UTC+3 (Yemen Standard Time)

Al-Shihr District (Arabic: مديرية الشحر) is a district of the Hadhramaut Governorate, Yemen. As of 2021, the district had a population of 116,088 inhabitants.

== Geography ==
The district contains hills such as Khashm ‘Urf, Khashm Khuwayr, Duqm al Muḩawwal, Khashm al Muḩawwal, Ra's Ḩawrā', ‘Aqabat al ‘Arshah and ‘Aqabat Ma‘dī. Wadis in the district include Shi‘b Ruş‘ah, Wādī ‘Arf, Wādī ‘Ārif, Wādī al Ghalāghil, Wādī al Qibālī, Wādī Disabah, Wādī Ghanam, Wādī Ḩaqab, Wādī Ma‘dī and Wādī Şayq.
