= Hadhramaut Governorate =

Governorate of Yemen

Hadhramaut Governorate محافظة حضرموت
- Governorate
- Interactive map of Hadhramaut Governorate
- Coordinates: 16°40′N 49°30′E
- Country: Yemen
- Seat: Mukalla

Government
  - Body: Hadramout National Council
  - Governor: Salem Al-Khanbashi

Area
  - Total: 191,737 km^{2} (74,030 sq mi)
  - Rank: 1st place

Population (2011)
  - Total: 2,255,000
  - Density: 11.76/km^{2} (30.46/sq mi)
- ISO 3166 code: YE-HD

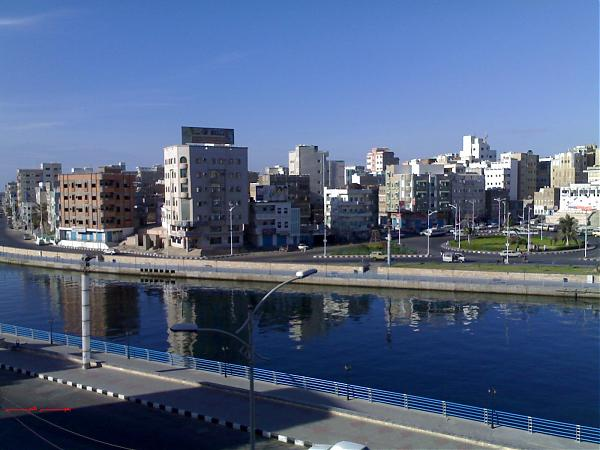
Hadramout's capital Al-Mukalla

Hadhramaut Governorate (Note: also romanized Hadramawt, Hadramaut or Hadramout, pronounced /ˌhɑːdrəˈmɔːt/ HAH-drə-MAWT) (Arabic: محافظة حضرموت, romanized: Muḥāfaẓat Ḥaḍramawt) is a governorate of Yemen. Lying within the large historical region of Hadhramaut, it is the country's largest governorate. The capital of Hadhramaut is the city of Mukalla. Other cities in Hadhramaut include the historical towns of Shibam, Sena, Seiyun, Tarim, and Ash Shihr.

The Socotra Archipelago was transferred from the Aden Governorate to the Hadhramaut Governorate in 2004. It was subsequently separated to create Socotra Governorate in December 2013.

== Etymology ==
The origins of the name Ḥaḍramawt are disputed, and numerous debated hypotheses regarding its meaning exist. The most popular folk etymology is that the word comes from a nickname of Amer bin Qahtan, who is thought to be the first person to dwell in the region, meaning "death has come", from the words in Arabic: حَضَر, romanized: ḥaḍara, lit. 'he came' and Arabic: مَوْت, romanized: mawt, lit. 'death'. Another theory is that it is a variant of the name of Islamic prophet Hud (Note: identified as Eber in Biblical tradition) who was sent to this region or his last words "Ludara al-mawt," meaning "death has come."

The name Ḥaḍramawt has also been found within Biblical Hazarmaveth. The name means "court of death" and is composed of two parts: Hebrew: חֲצַרְ, romanized: ḥaṣar, lit. 'dwelling; court' and Hebrew: מָוֶת māweṯ "death". There, Hud was the descendant of ʿĀd, son of Joktan, (Note: identified as Qahtan in Islamic tradition) the purported ancestor and progenitor of the South Arabian kingdoms. According to tradition, the family of ʿĀd was the first to settle in the region, and when the sons of ʿĀd had died, Amer bin Qahtan, nicknamed "Hadhramaut", came to power.

Though the origins of the name are unknown, there are several scholarly proposals. Kamal Salibi says that the diphthong "-aw" is an incorrect vocalisation, noting that "-ūt" is a frequent ending for place names in the Ḥaḍramawt; given that "Ḥaḍramūt" is the colloquial pronunciation of the name, and also its ancient pronunciation, the correct reading of the name would thus be "place of ḥḍrm". Salibi proposes, then, that the name means "the green place", which is appropriate given its well-irrigated wadis, giving a lushness that contrasts with the surrounding high desert plateau.

Variations of the name are attested to as early as the middle of the 1st millennium BC. The names ḥḍrmt (𐩢𐩳𐩧𐩣𐩩) and ḥḍrmwt (𐩢𐩳𐩧𐩣𐩥𐩩) are found in texts of the Old South Arabian languages (Ḥaḍramitic, Minaic, Qatabanic and Sabaic), though the second form is not found in any known Ḥaḍramitic inscriptions. In either form, the word itself can be a toponym, a tribal name, or the name of the kingdom of Ḥaḍramawt. In the late fourth or early 3rd century BC, Theophrastus gives the name Άδρραμύτα, a direct transcription of the Semitic name into Greek.

== Geography ==
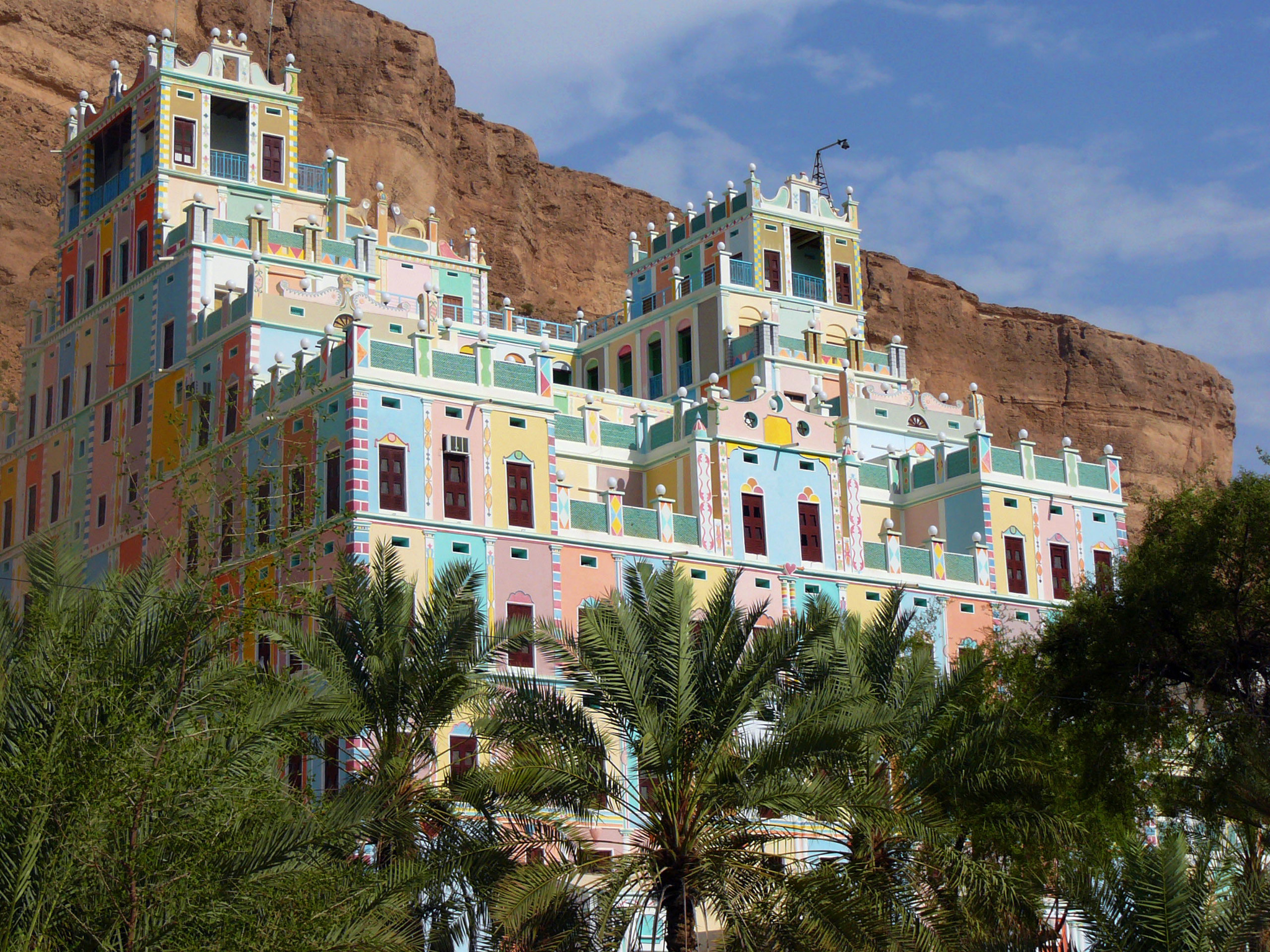
The Bugshan Palace in Wadi Dawan

Governorates of Yemen

=== Adjacent governorates ===
- Al Mahrah Governorate (east)
- Al Jawf Governorate (west)
- Marib Governorate (west)
- Shabwah Governorate (south and west)

=== Districts ===
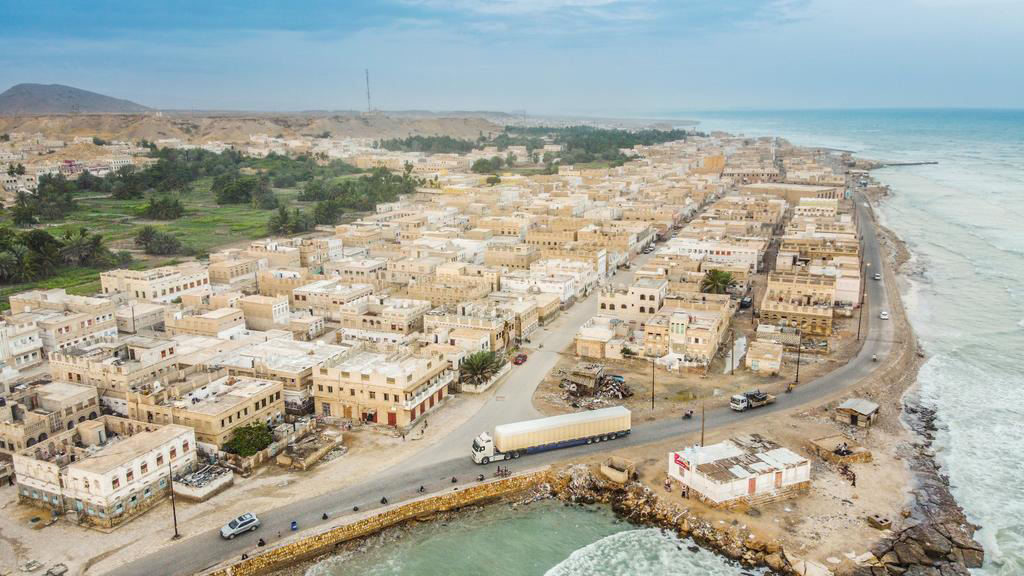
Al-Hami coastal town

Hadhramaut Governorate is divided into the following 28 districts, after the creation of Socotra Governorate in December 2013. These districts are further divided into sub-districts, and further still into villages:

- Ad Dis district
- Adh Dhlia'ah district
- Al Abr district
- Mukalla Rural district
- Mukalla City district
- Al Qaf district
- Al Qatn district
- Amd district
- Ar Raydah Wa Qusayar district
- As Sawm district
- Ash Shihr district
- Brom Mayfa district
- Daw'an district
- Ghayl Ba Wazir district
- Ghayl Bin Yamin district
- Hagr As Sai'ar district
- Hajr district
- Hawrah district
- Huraidhah district
- Rakhyah district
- Rumah district
- Sah district
- Sayun district
- Shibam district
- Tarim district
- Thamud district
- Yabuth district
- Zamakh wa Manwakh district

Two districts have formed in the new Socotra Governorate since December 2013:

- Hidaybu district
- Qulensya Wa Abd Al Kuri district
- Qar`ran

=== Villages ===
- Abu Diyan
- Ad Dirah
- Ad Dufah
- Ad-Duruʽ
- Al-Bahth
- Al-Bayda'
- Al-Buhayrah
- Al-Buqayrayn
- Al Dahama
- Al-Fardah
- Al-Gharah
- Al-Ghaydah al-Khadra'
- Al-Ghuwayr
- Al-Ghuyaydah
- Al-Hadah
- Al-Hadiyah
- Al-Hamid
- Al-Harshiyat
- Al-Hasusah
- Al-Hawatiyiah
- Al-Hawtah
- Al-Haylah
- Al-Hazm
- Al-Hidbah
- Al-Huraydah
- Al-Huwaylah
- Al-Jidfirah
- Al-Juhayl
- Al-Juwadah
- Al-Kawdah
- Al-Kharabah, Al Qatn district
- Al-Khirbah
- Al-Khubbah
- Al-Lisb
- Al-Madudah
- Al-Mashhad
- Al-Mawsaf
- Al-Mekrab
- Al-Mirad
- Al-Mukhtabi'Ah
- Al-Mutaywil
- Al-Qatn
- Al-Qawz
- Al-Qaʽudah
- Al-Qumrah
- Al-Qurayn
- Al-Quzah
- Al-Wasitah
- Al-Wulayjat
- Al-ʽAdiyaḥ
- Al-ʽAsila
- Al-ʽUqaymah
- Anqorah
- An Najil
- An-Naqʽah
- An-Nuʽayr
- Ar Rabwah
- Ar Rawuk
- Ar Ribat
- Ar Ridah Ash Sharqiyiah
- Ar Rihib
- Ar Rubah
- Ar Rujaydah
- Ar Rukayb
- Ar Ujaydah
- Ard Ar Raydah
- As Sabikhat
- As Sadarah
- As Sawm
- As Sihib
- As Simah
- As Sirrayn
- As Sufal
- As Suwayri
- Asfal al-ʽAyn
- Ash Shajar
- Az Zaghfah, Ash Shihr district
- 'Atud, Adh Dhlia'ah district
- Ba Hafar
- Ba Hudhayl
- Barwaj, Al Qatn district
- Bayt Qishn
- Budah
- Burayyirah
- Buwaysh
- Diyar Bani Thabit
- Fayl
- Findah
- Fughmah
- Fuwah
- Ghuraf
- Ghurib
- Hadbat as-Suqʽan
- Hadun
- Haid al-Jazil
- Hawtat As Sadah
- Haynan
- Hazm Haynan
- Husun As Salasil
- Husun As Sufayra'
- Husun Bin Humam
- Jarb al-Fiqr
- Jarif
- Jarshah
- Jaʽʽarah
- Jidfaʽah
- Jilʽah
- Juʽaymah
- Juwat al-al-Muhanna
- Kalbut
- Kaydam Ba Masdus
- Khabarah
- Khashamir
- Khubayah
- Khudaysh
- Khumayr
- Labah
- Lahmas
- Lahrum
- Larmi
- Libnat Ba Rushayd
- Lubayb
- Luqnah
- Mahasin
- Mahmidah
- Manawirah
- Mankhar
- Maryamah
- Maṣnaʽah
- Masnaʽat al-Qaʽ
- Mawla Matar
- Mawshah
- Minwakh
- Miʽyan al-Masajid
- Mudhaynib
- Murabbaʽ Ba Ghamis
- Nafhun
- Niʽaydah
- Numayr
- Qabr Hanzalah
- Qarʽan
- Qarn Bin ʽAdwan
- Qusayʽir
- Rabad Ba Suwadih
- Rijlat al-ʽIjlah
- Ruhab
- Safulah
- Sarar, Yemen
- Sharj Al az-Zuʽ
- Sharj al-Bin Salim
- Shiʽb an-Nur
- Taris
- Tawban
- Yashhar
- Yuwan
- Zukaykah
- Zulumah
- ʽAjlaniyah
- ʽAnaq
- ʽArd as-Suqayr
- ʽArd ʽAbd'Allah
- ʽAyn Barad
- ʽUqran
- ʽUrum
- Wasit

== See also ==
- Hadhramaut Mountains

== Sources ==
- Lewcock, Ronald B. (1986). Wādī Ḥaḍramawt and the Walled City of Shibām. Unesco. ISBN 978-92-3-102338-5.
