= Igziabeher =

God, in the Amharic or Ge'ez language

Igziabeher (Ge'ez: እግዚአብሔር ′Əgziäbəḥer /əɡziˈɑːbəhɛr/) literally translates to "Lord of the universe" or "everything," i.e. the Christian God, in the Ge'ez language, as well as modern Ethio-semitic languages including Amharic. Igziabher in Ge'ez is composed of 'əgzi (Lord, ruler) plus a euphonic -'a added to the vowel to signify the construct (i.e. "ruler of") followed by bəḥer, which translates to "tribe" or "ethnicity" in both Classical Ethiopic and Amharic. Another, more generic, Ethiopian word for God is amlak (አምላክ) which can be applied to deities of any religion and is a broken plural of Malik, Proto-Semitic for king.

In the fourth century, the Axumites ruled a large part of modern-day Eritrea and Northern Ethiopia. People in their realm worshipped several gods, called Beher, Astar, and Maher. Igziabeher is possibly a variant of the name Beher, making it a Christianization of the earlier pagan deity. The term is often times shortened to simply igzi, ye-igzi (my or the lord). Igziabher is also used within the Rastafari movement as a name of Jah (God). It can be heard in the roots reggae and dub reggae music of artists such as Peter Broggs and Peter Tosh (who recorded a song named "Igziabeher (Let Jah Be Praised)" on his album Legalize It), The Abyssinians, Third World and Midnite.
