= Sabaean invasion of Hadramawt =

Sabaean military and cultural expansion into Hadramawt

Sabaean invasion of Hadhramawt
Date	Early 7th BC-Early 4th century AD.
Location	Hadhramaut, Southern Arabia, Modern day Yemen.
Result	Sabaean victory

Belligerents
Sabaean Kingdom; Himyarite Kingdom	Kingdom of Hadhramaut

Commanders and leaders
Karib'il Watar; Shammar Yahri'sh; Dhamar Ali Yahbur	Unknown

Casualties and losses
Unknown	Unknown

The Sabaean invasion of Hadramawt was a process of Sabaean political and cultural expansion into Hadramawt in the early 7th century BC, during the reign of the mukarrib Karib'il Watar. According to the Sirwah inscription, Karib'il Watar expanded Saba' from a small area around Ma'rib and the southern Jawf into a state that included the formerly independent kingdoms of Kaminahu, Haram, Qataban and Hadramawt. Archaeologically, the period saw the replacement of the earlier "ancient wadi Hadramawt culture" by a "classical Hadramawt culture" with strong Sabaean features. The nature of this expansion remains disputed, with interpretations ranging from military conquest to migration and cultural assimilation. Sabaean and Himyarite armies attacked Hadramawt again in the 3rd and 4th centuries AD, and these later campaigns ended the Hadramawt kingdom.

== Background ==
By the early first millennium BC the development of irrigated agriculture created a network of small towns in Hadramawt such as Makaynun, Raybun and Shabwa. Their growth was limited by the volume of floodwater from tributary valleys. Despite this agricultural development, Hadramawt remained politically fragmented The settlements in the Hadramawt interior, Michel Mouton suggests, do not appear to have been incorporated into the domain of the king of Hadramawt, whose city was Shabwa at the frontier of the Ramlat as-Sab'atayn. The valley region is called Sariran ('the valley') in the Sabaean and Himyarite inscriptions. In antiquity, then, the term Hadramawt most likely denoted the region of the kingdom centered at Shabwa.

== Expansion under Karib'il Watar ==
The main evidence for the expansion is the res gestae of Karib'il Watar at Sirwah (RES 3945), which lists Hadramawt among the kingdoms brought into the Sabaean state. The text is undated. Dan Potts suggested that the inscription probably predates Sabaean diplomatic contact with Assyria and Sennacherib's bit akiti inscription (c. 683 BC). This would place the inscription before 689 BC, possibly around the beginning of the 7th century BC One chapter in the volume edited by Hatke and Ruzicka also places the military intervention of the Sabaean army in the Jawf under Karib'il Watar in the first half of the 7th century BC. Mouton refers to a "Sabaean conquest in the 7th century BC", and states that the kings of Shabwa exercised only partial and occasional political control over the wider region, perhaps never before that conquest.

=== The title mukarrib ===
For Mouton, the title mukarrib reflected authority over several valleys and communities that shared neither a common history nor a tutelary deity. Christian Robin has proposed that the domain of Karib'il Watar had "two degrees of inclusion within Saba'": descent from the god Almaqah, and "the Union". Thus, the ruler was king of the first group and mukarrib of the second. Two mukarribs are attested explicitly for Hadramawt itself.

== Archaeological evidence ==
Jérémie Schiettecatte describes how the "ancient wadi Hadramawt culture" gradually disappears and a new "classical Hadramawt culture" emerges. Sabaean cultural influences are evident at most archaeological sites, particularly in: the Sabaic language, veneration of the Sabaean deities Almaqah and Dhat-Himyam, dedications on fine stone slabs and architecture based on half-timbered houses with mudbrick infill walls above a stone foundation. These elements are also evidenced with inscriptions found at Suna, Hajar al-Barira, Bi'r Hamad, Shabwa, Makaynun, and Raybun.

== Interpretations ==
The Russian archaeologist Alexander Sedov suggested that the new pottery and other evidence show a migration of northern, apparently Sabaean, tribes into Hadramawt. They mixed with the native population to form a culture of Hadrami 'substratum' and Sabaean 'adstratum'. Schiettecatte finds this determinist approach hard to accept, though conceivable. He suggests that the transfer might have taken place within the framework of the early 7th-century Sabaean expansion, while Hadramawt and Saba' were allies, without any new tribe settling in, and that any new settlement was probably limited. Potts, following Robin and Nebes, treats the episode as part of Karib'il Watar's conquests. These interpretations differ primarily over the extent of Sabaean political control and the role of population movement in the cultural transformation of Hadramawt. Elsewhere, Karib'il Watar is reported to have annexed the Jawf city of Nashshan and settled Sabaeans there, but the sources do not report an equivalent measure for Hadramawt.

== Aftermath ==
Mouton and Schiettecatte both note that Sabaean domination never achieved a political hegemony over inner Hadramawt. The inscriptions from the interior cities do not mention the king at Shabwa or his agents, and it seems that inner Hadramawt did not fall under the political sphere of the Hadramawt king until the end of the first millennium BC.

== Later Sabaean and Himyarite campaigns ==
Later military expeditions of Sabaean and Himyarite rulers to conquer Hadramawt took place in the 3rd and 4th centuries AD. Schiettecatte mentions inscriptions mentioning a campaign undertaken by Shammar Yuhar'ish (also spelled Samir or Shamar Yuhar'ish) at the close of the 3rd century AD, and a later one led by Dhamar'ali Yuhabirr in the beginning of the 4th century.

=== Campaign of Shammar Yuhar'ish ===
According to Hatke, Hadramawt was attacked by Shammar Yuhar'ish (r. c. 287–312 AD) in 296 AD, who seized Shabwa and stationed Sabaean troops there under the officer Ya'mur Ashwa'. The king also sent a delegate on a pilgrimage to the Hadrami god Siyyan, which Hatke regards as a political gesture toward the vanquished Hadramis. After this success the king added "Hadramawt and Yamanat" to his royal title. According to Hatke, at this stage Himyar controlled only a handful of places, including Shabwa, Wadi Jurdan, 'Abadan and Bayhan, while Wadi Hadramawt (Sariran) remained independent. The king then sent his army against the towns of 'Uqran, Shibam and Say'un.

=== Final campaigns and the fall of the kingdom ===
Under Yasirum Yuhan'im II (c. 316–319 AD), his son Dhara'amar Ayman and the king's forces launched a campaign involving Himyarite, Sabaean and Arab mercenaries that defeated a Hadrami force at 'Arak and then the main Hadrami force at the wells of Khurshum. Another campaign launched by Dhamar'ali Yuhabirr (c. 321–324 AD) sacked Sawa'ran, a town at the head of Wadi Hadramawt, and captured the towns of Shibam, Radifan, Raghatum, Say'un, Maryamatum, Hidb, 'Urr-Ahlan and Tarim. The campaign ended with the subjugation of Dammun, Mashat and 'Urr Kulaybim, and with these events the Hadramawt kingdom was destroyed.

=== Jamme's reconstruction ===
Alfred Jamme's 1962 publication of the Mahram Bilqis inscriptions describes a similar conquest from the Sabaean point of view, reconstructing a military expedition of Shammar Yuhar'ish (whom Jamme calls Samir Yuhar'ish) against two Hadrami kings, Sarah'il and Rabb'amsum. He estimates the date of this ruler's rule to c. AD 305–15. The inscriptions Ja 656, Ja 662, and CIH 431 + 438 record the taking of Shabwa and Shibam. A Sabaean army is said to have defeated the Hadramis in combat at Sarr, which Jamme identifies with the northwestern tributary of Wadi Hadramawt (about 7 km west of Shibam). Jamme takes the fragment of a text, CIH 948, as evidence for a Hadrami rebellion that seized the initiative following a Sabaean withdrawal, and Ja 665 records a further Sabaean expedition into northwestern Hadramawt. Jamme argues that the conquest was limited to the northwestern part of Wadi Hadramawt and that the extent of Shammar Yuhar'ish's victory has been overstated. Schiettecatte suggests that Himyar annexed the Hadramawt kingdom at the beginning of the 4th century AD.
