= ʿAṯtar =

Semitic deity associated with Venus

- Deity of the Morning and Evening Star
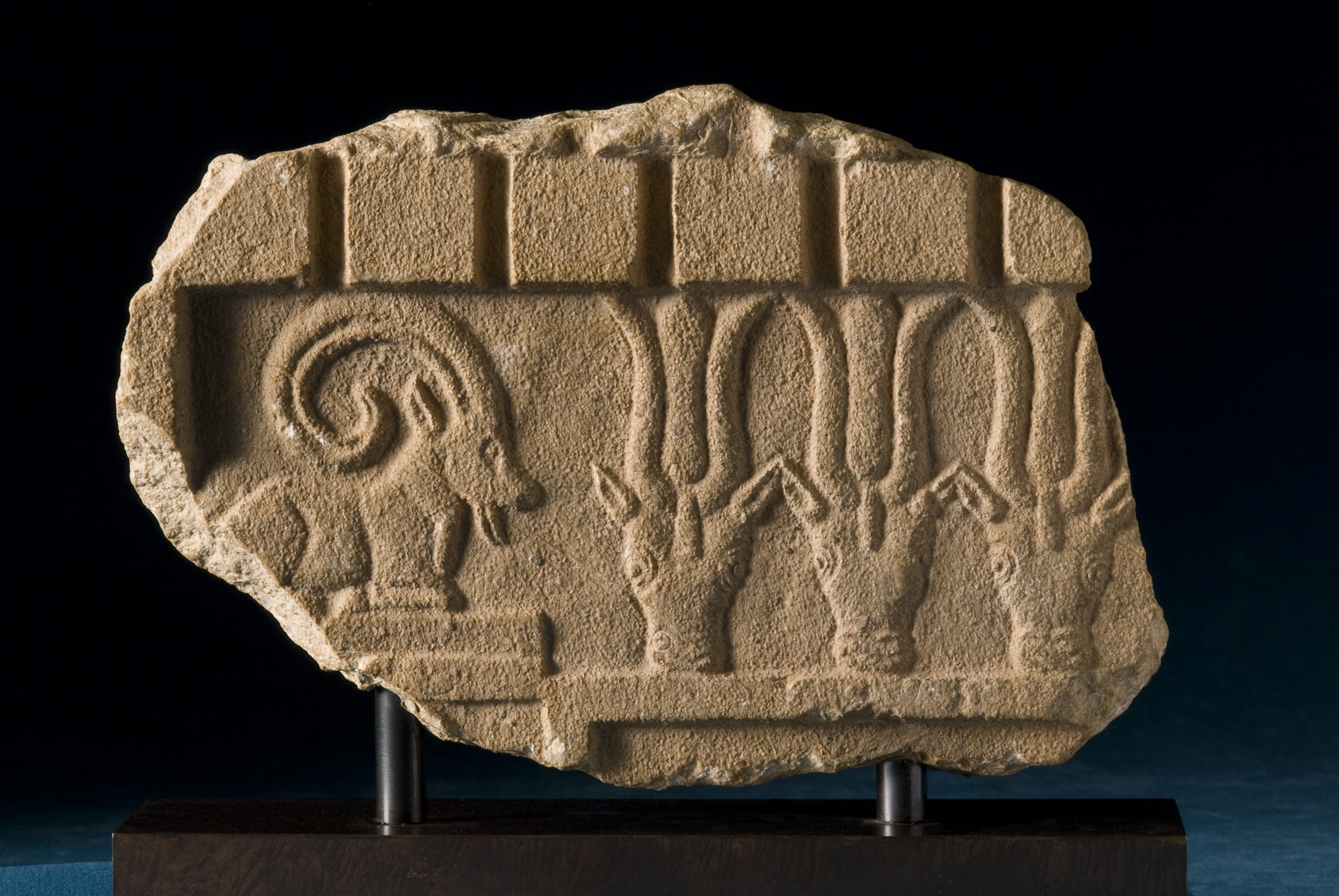
- South Arabian fragment of a stela depicting a reclining ibex and three Arabian oryx heads, which were associated with ʿAṯtar.
- Planet: Venus
- Animals: Gazelle (in Syria); Nubian ibex (in South Arabia)

Equivalents
- Mesopotamian: Lugal-Marada, Zababa (through equation with Aštabi), Ninurta (through equation with Aštabi and Lugal-Marada)
- Hurrian: Aštabi

ʿAṯtar or Athtar, is a deity whose role, name, and even gender varied across ancient Semitic religion. In both genders, ʿAṯtar is identified with the planet Venus, the morning and evening star. ʿAṯtar is a prominent character in the Baal Cycle and is considered an astral warrior god, being given the titles "Athtar of the Stars" and "Athtar of the Heaven". It has been suggested that ʿAṯtar as a masculine Venus god was syncretized into the depiction of feminine Venus goddess Inanna in her depiction as having a masculine beard.

== Name ==
The name appears in various Semitic languages as:

- the feminine form Ištar (𒀭𒀹𒁯) in Akkadian, who was assimilated to Inanna;
- the masculine form ʿAṯtar (عثتر, Arabic pronunciation: [ʕaθ.tar]) in Arabic;
- and the masculine form ʿÄstär (ዐስተር) in Ethio-Semitic languages.

== Attestations ==
=== Among Amorites ===
==== At Ugarit ====
===== ʿAṯtar =====
The Ugaritic masculine variant of ʿAṯtar, 𐎓𐎘𐎚𐎗 (ʿAṯtar), appears in the Baʿal Cycle.

===== ʿAṯtart =====
The Northwest Semitic feminine form of ʿAṯtar, the Great Goddess 𐎓𐎘𐎚𐎗𐎚 (ʿAṯtart), is often mentioned in Ugaritic ritual texts, but played a minor role in mythological texts.

=== Among Aramaeans ===
Among the Aramaeans, ʿAṯtar appears in a masculine form as the god 𐡏𐡕𐡓 (ʿAttar), in which capacity he was identified with the baetyl as 𒁹𒀀𒋻𒋡𒈬 (ʿAttar-qāmu, lit. 'ʿAttar is the baetyl').

Within the ancient Aramaean religion, the deceased ancestors of the clans, called ʿamm, were worshipped as idealised figures who could become assimilated to ʿAttar, as evidenced by personal names such as 𒁹𒀀𒋻𒄩𒄠 𒁹𒀀𒋻𒄩𒈬 (ʿAttar-ʿammu, lit. 'ʿAttar is the ancestor'), and 𒁹𒀀𒀜𒋻 and 𒁹𒀀𒈨𒀀𒋻 (ʿAmmī-ʿAttar, lit. 'My ancestor is ʿAttar').

The use of the name of the god ʿAttar as a theophoric element is attested in the name 𐡁𐡓𐡏𐡕𐡓 (Bar-ʿAttar, lit. 'Son of ʿAttar'), which is attested on an 8th-century BC stamp seal and was also the name of the earliest known ruler of Laqē, as well as 𐡏𐡕𐡓𐡎𐡌𐡊 (ʿAttar-sumki, lit. 'ʿAttar is my support'), which was the name of two rulers of the kingdom of Bēt-Gūš. The name of this god always appears in the masculine form even in women's names, such as ʿAttar-ramat and ʿAttar-ṭabat, thus attesting that the Aramaean ʿAttar was a distinctly masculine deity.

==== ʿAttar-Šamayin ====
One of the hypostases of the Aramaean ʿAttar was 𐡏𐡕𐡓𐡔𐡌𐡉𐡍 (ʿAttar-Šamayin), that is the ʿAttar of the Heavens: in this role, ʿAttar was the incarnation of the sky's procreative power in the form of the moisture provided by rain, which made fertile his consort, the goddess of the Earth which has been dried up by the summer heat. Due to ʿAttar's role as a provider of rain, his epithet "of the Heavens" refers to his manifestation as lightning and thunder in the skies.

The name of the goddess who was the consort of ʿAttar is itself not attested in Aramaic, but is recorded in Sabaic as 𐩠𐩥𐩨𐩪 (Huwbis) or 𐩠𐩨𐩪 (Hūbis), which was derived from the South Semitic root 𐩺-𐩨-𐩪 (y-b-s), itself a declension of the Semitic root y-b-š, meaning "to be dry." The position of Hūbis/Huwbis as the consort of ʿAttar-Šamayin is attested by the depiction of a goddess in front of a standing worshipper on an 8th-century Aramaean cylinder seal, with the image of a vulva, the symbol of Hūbis/Huwbis, being present behind the goddess and over a recumbent gazelle - the sacred animal of ʿAttar - over which was also inscribed the name of the god himself.

The earliest record of ʿAttar-Šamayin is from an Aramaic inscription on the 8th-century BC cylinder seal belonging to an individual named Barruq, who is described in the inscription as a 𐡏𐡁𐡃 𐡏𐡕𐡓𐡔𐡌𐡉𐡍 (ʿbd ʿtršmyn. lit. 'servant of ʿAttar-Šamayin'); Barruq's own name, which means "thunder," was a reference to ʿAttar-Šamayin in his role as a god associated with thunder and lightning.

=== In North-East Africa ===
In the Kingdom of Aksum situated in the Horn of Africa, ʿAttar was worshiped: as the god of the sun and moon and as the father of the other members of the Axumite pantheon: Maher and Beher, the former of which they shared with the Himyarite Kingdom. He was associated with the god Zeus.

=== In South Arabia ===
Among the ancient South Arabians, 𐩲𐩻𐩩𐩧 (ʿAṯtar) was a masculine deity who had retained the prominence of his role as the deity of the planet Venus as the Morning Star, and was a god presiding over thunderstorms and who provided natural irrigation as rain. ʿAṯtar thus held a very important place within the ancient South Arabian pantheon, in which he replaced the old Semitic high god ʾIl as the supreme deity.

The name of ʿAṯtar was suffixed with a mimation in the South Arabian kingdom of Ḥaḍramawt, thus giving the Ḥaḑramitic form 𐩲𐩯𐩩𐩧𐩣 (ʿśtrm).

Within South Arabian polytheism, ʿAṯtar held a supreme position within the cosmology of the ancient South Arabians as the god presiding over the whole world, always appeared first in lists, and had various manifestations with their own epithets. The rulers of the ancient South Arabian states would offer ritual banquets in honour of ʿAṯtar, with the banquet being paid for from the tithe offered to the god by the populace.

The patron deity of the Qatabānians, however, was the Moon-god, variously called 𐩲𐩣 (ʿAmm, in Qatabān) or (Sayīn, in Ḥaḍramawt), who was seen as being closer to the people compared to the more distant figure of ʿAṯtar, and the people of these states consequently called themselves the children of their respective Moon-god.

==== The hunter god ====
The South Arabian ʿAṯtar was a hunter god, and the ancient South Arabians performed ritual hunts in his honour as fertility rites with the goal of making the rain fall. The chosen prey during these hunts were probably gazelles, which were sacred to ʿAṯtar.

This hunter aspect of ʿAṯtar is also present in his Northwest Semitic feminine variant, who is called 𐎓𐎘𐎚𐎗𐎚𐎟𐎕𐎆𐎄𐎚 (ʿAṯtart ṣawwādatu, lit. 'ʿAṯtart the huntress') in one passage of an Ugaritic text. The Sabaic hallowed phrase 𐩺𐩥𐩣 𐩮𐩵 𐩮𐩺𐩵 𐩲𐩻𐩩𐩧 (ywm ṣd ṣyd ʿṯtr, lit. 'the day when he performed the hunt for ʿAṯtar') itself had a parallel in a reference to 𒄿𒈾 𒌋𒐋 𒌓𒈪 𒍝𒁺 𒊭 𒀭𒀸𒁯 (ina 16 umi ṣadu ša ᴰAštart, lit. 'on the 16th day is the hunt of ʿAṯtart') in a text from Emar.

==== Kirrūm ====
One of the hypostases of the South Arabian ʿAṯtar was 𐩫𐩧𐩥𐩣 (Kirrūm), whose name, which was a qittūl-pattern Semitic word formation meaning "rainfall," was related to Geʽez ክራምት (kəramt), Amharic ክረምት (krämt), Tigrē ካራም (karam), and Eastern Gurage ከርም (kärm), all meaning "rainy season." Kirrūm was thus a form of ʿAṯtar who provided fertility in the form of the rain he dispensed.

The Babylonians identified Kirrūm, under the name 𒀭𒆥𒀸𒈠 (ᴰKinruma), with their own goddess 𒀭𒀹𒁯 (ᴰIštar), who was herself the goddess of the planet Venus as well as the Mesopotamian feminine form of ʿAṯtar.

==== ʿAṯtar-Šariqān ====
Another hypostasis of the South Arabian ʿAṯtar was 𐩲𐩻𐩩𐩧𐩦𐩧𐩤𐩬 (ʿAṯtar-Šariqān), that is ʿAṯtar of the East, who was invoked especially in curses as an avenger god against enemies.

=== Among Arabs ===
ʿAṯtar was worshipped as a masculine deity among the ancient Arabs, who during the Iron Age were located principally in the Syrian Desert and North Arabia.

==== ʿAttar-ʾaśyimāʾ ====
Similarly to the link between ʿAttar and the ancestral cult of the ʿamm among the Aramaeans, there also existed a connection between ʿAttar and the cult of the ancestors among Arabs which is attested from as early as the 7th century BC in the form of a personal name recorded in Akkadian as 𒀭𒀀𒋫𒊏𒋛𒈠 (ᴰAtar-asima), from an original Ancient North Arabian form ʿAttar-ʾaśyimāʾ, in which the divine patron of a clan or tribe, the 𐪆𐪚𐪃 (śaym, of which ʾaśyimāʾ is the ʾafʿilāʾu-type broken plural), is assimilated to ʿAttar.

==== ʿAttar-Muṣurūn ====
One 8th century BC Aramaic inscription found in a tomb in a region of the Zagros Mountains close to a Mannaean royal tomb mentions ʿAttar as 𐡀𐡕𐡓𐡌𐡑𐡍 (ʿAttar-Muṣurūn), that is a variant of ʿAttar whose epithet was the Old Arabic plural form of مصر (muṣru), lit. 'march', with ʿAttar-Muṣurūn thus being ʿAttar of the Marches. The name "the Marches" itself was the designation assigned by the Mesopotamians to the northern Ḥijāz and the Negev. The name of the deity is followed by the title 𐡍𐡂𐡔 (ngš), corresponding to Ancient North Arabian 𐪌𐪔𐪆 (ngś) and Ethiosemitic ንጉሥ (nəguś), and meaning "the ruler."

ʿAttar-Muṣurūn was thus the main deity of North Arabia, and the tomb in which his name was found inscribed likely belonged to an Arab who had been deported by the Assyrians to their northeastern border regions.

==== In Qedar ====
===== ʿAttar-Šamē =====
The Qedarite Arabs worshipped ʿAṯtar in his form of ʿAttar-Šamayin, whose name is attested in Ancient North Arabian as 𐪒𐪉𐪇𐪊𐪃 (ʿAttar-Šamē). Assyrian records mention this god, referred to in Akkadian as 𒀭𒀀𒋻𒊓𒈠𒀀𒀀𒅔 (ᴰAtar-Samayin, reflecting the Aramaic form ʿAttar-Šamayin rather than the Ancient North Arabian ʿAttar-Šamē), as one of the Qedarite deities whose idols were captured as war booty by the Neo-Assyrian king Sîn-ahhī-erība and was returned to the Qedarites by his son and successor Aššur-aḫa-iddina.

===== ʿAṯtar-Kirrūm =====
The worship of ʿAṯtar in his form of ʿAṯtar-Kirrūm was also practised by the Qedarites, as attested by an inscription of the Neo-Assyrian king Aššur-aḫa-iddina mentioning this deity in Akkadian as 𒀭𒀀𒋻𒆪𒊒𒈠𒀀 (ᴰAtar-Kumrumā), with the dissimilation of the epithet kirrūm into kumrumā reflecting the influence of Akkadian 𒆪𒌝𒀸 (kumrum) and Aramaic 𐡊𐡅𐡌𐡓𐡅 (kumru), meaning "priest."

==== In Palmyra ====
===== Bōlʿastōr =====
At Palmyra, where lived a large Arab population, the Arab ʿAṯtar was assimilated with the Arameo-Canaanite great god, Baʿal, in the form of Bōlʿaṯtār, later 𐡡𐡥𐡫𐡰𐡯𐡶𐡴 (Bōlʿastōr), that is Baʿal-ʿAṯtar.

=== In Canaan ===
The masculine form 𐤏𐤔𐤕𐤓 (ʿAštar) existed among the Canaanite peoples as an astral deity, which is attested by his mention along with the Moon-God Šaggar in the 9th or 7th century BC Dayr ʿAllā inscription, the subject of which is largely the Sun-goddess Šamāš, thus forming a triad of the Sun, Moon, and Venus similarly to the one attested in South Arabia, and suggesting a South Arabian religious influence in Moab. The hypostases of ʿAṯtar who appear among the various Canaanite peoples might have been an indigenous Transjordanian variation of his or local adaptations of the North Arabian variant of the god.

==== In Phoenicia ====
===== ʿAštar =====
A possible Phoenician variant of ʿAštar might be attested as a theophoric element 𐤏𐤔𐤕𐤓 (ʿAštar) in a personal name from Byblos, 𐤏𐤔𐤕𐤓𐤇𐤍 (ʿštr-ḥn).

===== ʿAštarum =====
In the 5th century BC, under the Achaemenid Empire, a shrine dedicated to ʿAštar existed in the Sharon Plain in Canaan, at a location corresponding to the present-day Israeli town of Elyakhin, where he was worshipped by Phoenicians, Aramaeans, and Arabs.

Arabian units of the Achaemenid army stationed in Canaan during the 5th century BC who participated in the cult of ʿAštar have left inscriptions recording his name, suffixed with a mimation to differentiate him from the Canaanite feminine form of ʿAṯtar, 𐤏𐤔𐤕𐤓𐤕 (ʿAštart), in the Phoenician and Aramaic scripts as 𐤏𐤔𐤕𐤓𐤌 and 𐡏𐡔𐡕𐡓𐡌 (ʿAštarum). This form of the god's name was distinctly North Arabian, showing that the worshippers who had left these inscriptions were originally from North Arabia, possibly from Taymāʿ or Dadān.

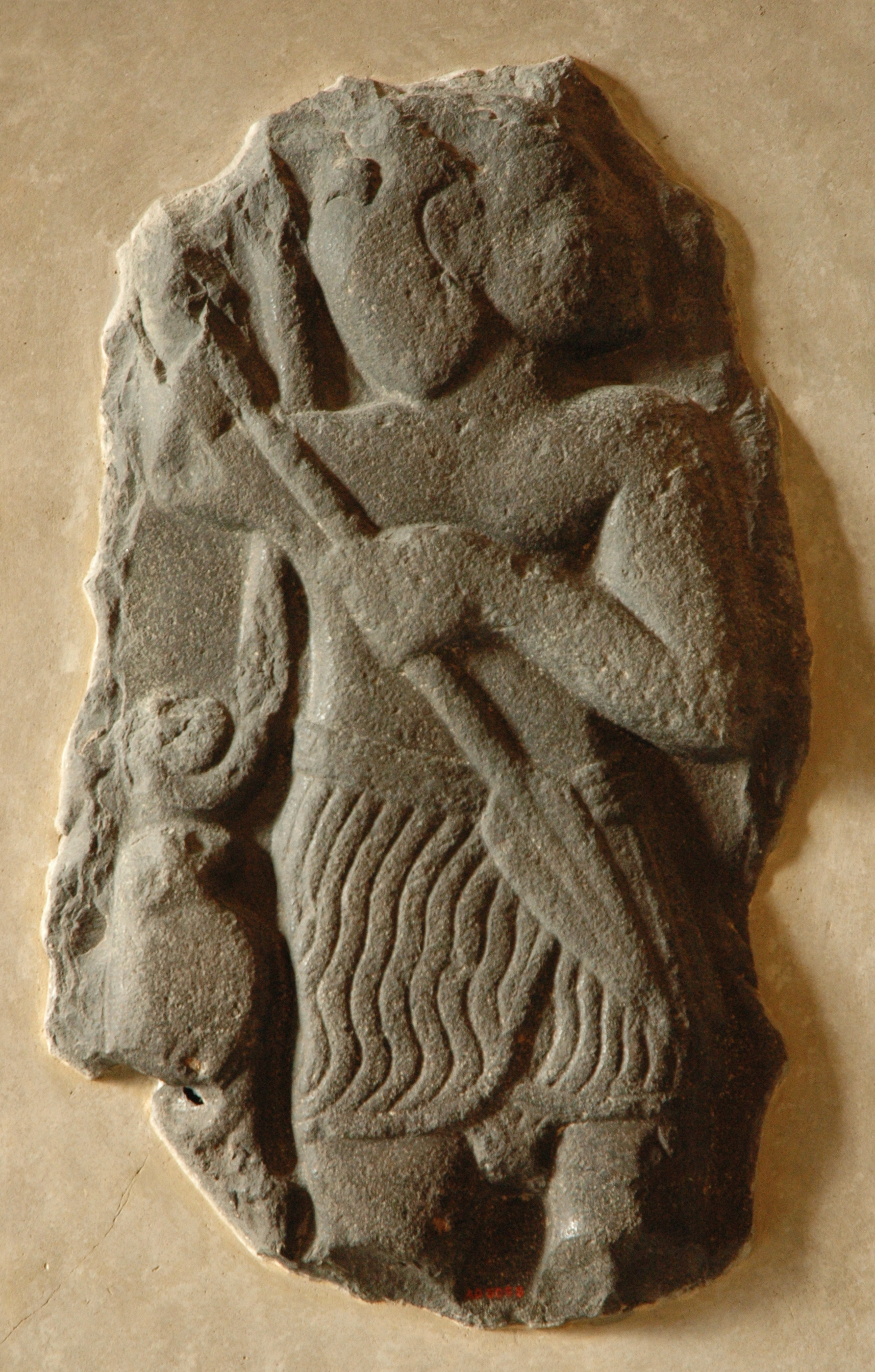
The Moabite deity Kamōš

==== In Moab ====
===== ʿAštar-Kamōš =====
ʿAštar was attested among the Canaanite people of the Moabites during the 9th century BC, when he was identified with the patron god of Moab, 𐤊𐤌𐤔 (Kamōš), in the form of 𐤏𐤔𐤕𐤓𐤊𐤌𐤔 (ʿAštar-Kamōš).

According to the inscription of the Moabite king Mōšaʿ on the victory stele commemorating his triumph in a war against the Israelites, he had sacrificed the whole population of the town of Nebo to ʿAštar-Kamōš. This was likely due to the influence of the South Arabian ʿAṯtar-Šariqān, that is of ʿAštar's hypostasis as an avenger deity who was invoked in curses against enemies.

==== In Israel ====
Pierre Grelot, and Michael Heiser argued that the Canaanite tale of Athtar was being drawn upon in Isaiah 14. In the myth, Athtar attempts to replace Ba'al on his divine throne at mount Zaphon. Athtar does not meet the requirements for the exalted throne, and instead descends into the underworld to rule. It was used as a symbolic parallel and mockery against the Babylonian ruler attempting to claim divine kingship, but still being thrown down into Sheol. W.G.E Watson notes that while the Hebrew hêlēl corresponds to the Ugaritic hll (brightness and shining), the narrative in Isaiah shares strongest affinity with Athtar. Supported by parallel terminology and common forms, such as Hebrew hr m'd and Ugaritic pḫr m'd (mount of the assembly) and Hebrew yrkty ṣpwn and Ugaritic mrym ṣpn (heights of Saphon). Athtar's epithet could also mean "luminous" which may further align the figures, but this is disputed as there is no evidence of Helel's cultic worship or existence, and it is being used as a rhetorical device to mockingly designate the king of Babylon.

The New Oxford Annotated Bible mentions that Ezekiel 28 and the downfall of the king of Tyre or cherub, may have been referenced in relation to Athtar.

=== In Europe ===
Athtar has been compared with the classical Greek god Phaethon, who is also associated with the dawn. He attempts to drive the chariot of the sun, but is found inadequate and struck down by a thunderbolt. This story may share a common older Canaanite prototype about astral pride and a dramatized fall. John William McKay instead proposes a possible transmission in which the Phaethon myth involving the fallen child of the Dawn goddess, merged with the Levantine Athtar tradition.

=== Legacy ===
==== In popular culture ====
ʿAštar appears as the demon Ashtar in the video game Shin Megami Tensei II.

== See also ==
- Asherah
- Lucifer
- Phosphorus
- Venus in culture

== Sources ==
- Bryce, Trevor (2009). The Routledge Handbook of the Peoples and Places of Ancient Western Asia: From the Early Bronze Age to the Fall of the Persian Empire. London, United Kingdom: Routledge. ISBN 978-0-415-39485-7.
- Frayne, Douglas R.; Stuckey, Johanna H. (2021), A Handbook of Gods and Goddesses of the Ancient Near East: Three Thousand Deities of Anatolia, Syria, Israel, Sumer, Babylonia, Assyria, and Elam, Penn State University Press, ISBN 9781646021277.
- George, Andrew R. (1993). House most high: the temples of ancient Mesopotamia. Winona Lake: Eisenbrauns. ISBN 0-931464-80-3. OCLC 27813103.
- Hoyland, Robert G. (2002). Arabia and the Arabs: From the Bronze Age to the Coming of Islam. London, United Kingdom: Routledge. ISBN 978-1-134-64634-0.
- Lipiński, Edward (1975). Studies in Aramaic Inscriptions and Onomastics. Orientalia Lovaniensia analecta. Vol. 1. Leuven, Belgium: Leuven University Press. ISBN 978-9-061-86019-8.
- Lipiński, Edward (1995). Dieux et déesses de l'univers phénicien et punique [Gods and Goddesses of the Phoenician and Punic Universe]. Orientalia Lovaniensia analecta (in French). Vol. 64. Leuven, Belgium: Leuven University Press. ISBN 978-9-068-31690-2.
- Lipiński, Edward (2000). The Aramaeans: Their Ancient History, Culture, Religion. Orientalia Lovaniensia analecta. Vol. 100. Leuven, Belgium: Peeters Publishers. ISBN 978-9-042-90859-8.
- Lipiński, Edward (2006). On the Skirts of Canaan in the Iron Age: Historical and Topographical Researches. Orientalia Lovaniensia analecta. Vol. 153. Leuven, Belgium: Peeters Publishers. ISBN 978-9-042-91798-9.
- Tugendhaft, Aaron (2016). "Gods on clay: Ancient Near Eastern scholarly practices and the history of religions". In Grafton, Anthony; Most, Glenn W. (eds.). Canonical Texts and Scholarly Practices. Cambridge: Cambridge University Press. p. 164. doi:10.1017/cbo9781316226728.009.
- Van Beek, Gus W. (1997a). "Ḥadhramaut". In Dever, William G.; Meyers, Carol L.; Muhly, James D.; Pardee, Dennis; Sauer, James A.; Finney, Paul Corby; Jorgensen, John S. (eds.). The Oxford Encyclopedia of Archaeology in the Near East. Vol. 2. Oxford, United Kingdom; New York City, United States: Oxford University Press. pp. 452–453.
- Van Beek, Gus W. (1997b). "Qataban". In Meyers, Eric M.; Dever, William G.; Meyers, Carol L.; Muhly, James D.; Pardee, Dennis; Sauer, James A.; Finney, Paul Corby; Jorgensen, John S. (eds.). The Oxford Encyclopedia of Archaeology in the Near East. Vol. 4. Oxford, United Kingdom; New York City, United States: Oxford University Press. pp. 383–384. ISBN 978-0-195-06512-1.
- Archi, Alfonso (1997). "Studies in the Ebla Pantheon II". Orientalia. 66 (4). GBPress - Gregorian Biblical Press: 414–425. ISSN 0030-5367. JSTOR 43078145.
- Ayali-Darshan, Noga (2014). "The Role of Aštabi in the Song of Ullikummi and the Eastern Mediterranean "Failed God" Stories". Journal of Near Eastern Studies. 73 (1). University of Chicago Press: 95–103. doi:10.1086/674665. ISSN 0022-2968. S2CID 163770018.
- Archi, Alfonso (2013). "The West Hurrian Pantheon and Its Background". In Collins, B. J.; Michalowski, P. (eds.). Beyond Hatti: a tribute to Gary Beckman. Atlanta: Lockwood Press. ISBN 978-1-937040-11-6. OCLC 882106763.
