= Mining industry of Yemen =

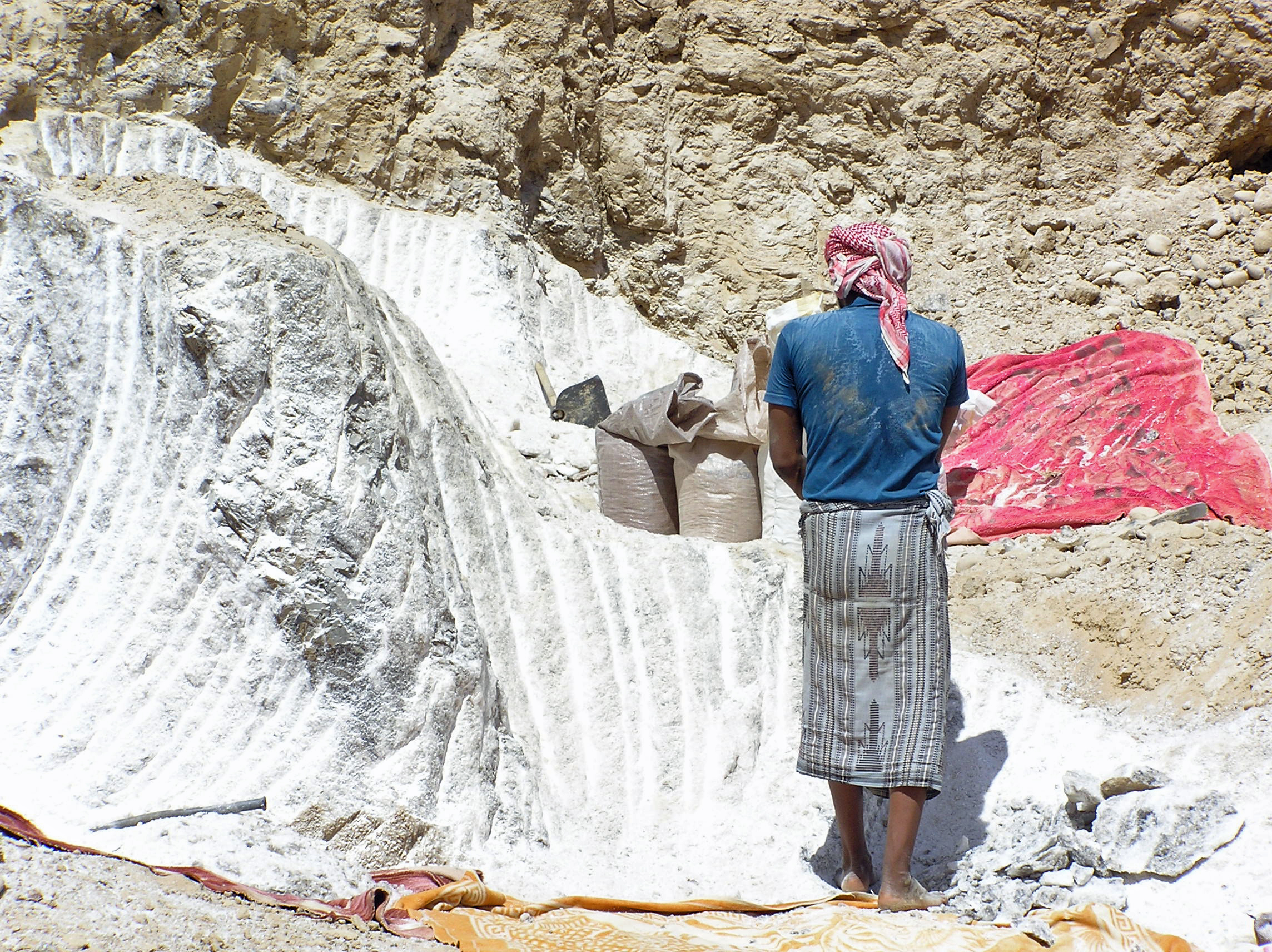
Salt mine near Shabwa, Yemen

The mining industry of Yemen is at present dominated by fossil mineral of petroleum and liquefied natural gas (LNG), and to a limited extent by extraction of dimension stone, gypsum, and refined petroleum. Reserves of metals like cobalt, copper, gold, iron ore, nickel, niobium, platinum-group metals, silver, tantalum, and zinc are awaiting exploration. Industrial minerals with identified reserves include black sands with ilmenite, monazite, rutile, and zirconium, celestine, clays, dimension stone, dolomite, feldspar, fluorite, gypsum, limestone, magnesite, perlite, pure limestone, quartz, salt, sandstone, scoria, talc, and zeolites; some of these are under exploitation.

Crude oil and natural gas reserves amounted to 3.0 billion barrels and 479 billion cubic meters. The slow progress in the mineral sector is on account of the security situation caused by civil strife and political uncertainty in the country which has been a deterrent for private companies to operate. As of 2010 the mineral industry's contribution to the country's GDP was 13.9%.

== History ==
Mining for gold by Sabaeans, which is now Yemen, is ancient history when a large number of gold mines existed. It is said that many of their palaces and temples were decorated with doors, ceilings and walls with gold, silver and gemstones. These old mines exist. In recent explorations carried out by the Geological Survey & Mineral Resources Board and Foreign Companies some of these mines have been identified.

== Production and impact ==
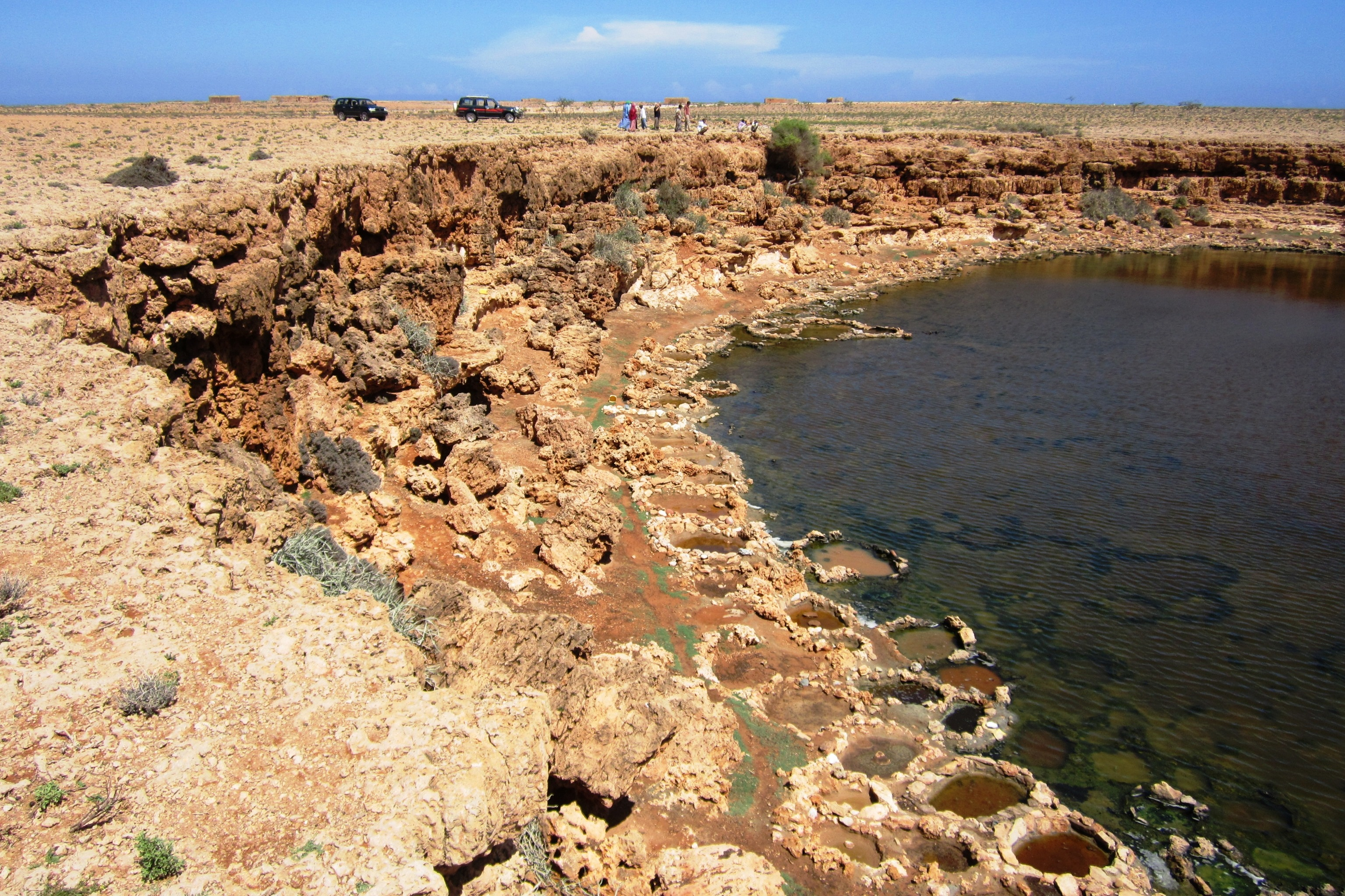
Salt pits in Socotra, Yemen

The Sana'a and Thammar Provinces had 819 active mining sites, as of 2013, and produced 2 million tons of building materials and 1,000 tons of some industrial minerals. In the fossil fuel sector, out of 105 concession blocks awarded, 13 blocks were exploited as of 2013. Export of petroleum accounted for 25% of the GDP growth providing revenue worth 70% to the government in 2011. Stone, gypsum, refined petroleum products, and salt have been produced during 2013. Also, in 2013, natural gas production, mostly exported as LNG, was of the order of 10.3 billion cubic meters.

== Legal framework ==
Earlier legal framework in mining sector consisted of basically the Mines & Quarries Law (No. 24 of 2002), Executive Regulations (Prime Minister's Decree No. 101 of 2007) and the Financial Regulations (Prime Minister's Decree No. 101 of 2007), which have been strengthened with new laws.

Mineral exploration and production operations are defined now by Mines and Quarries Law No. 22 of 2010 under Article 8 of Yemen's Constitution. This law, which was initially approved by the Government in 2010, received consent of the Parliament on 16 December 2011. The law provides for regulations related to prospecting, exploration, and mining operations including artisanal mining. Provisions in the law include royalty rates, income tax, limits on prospecting permits, and quarrying permits. The Ministry of Mines, through its Yemen Geological Survey and Mineral Resources Board (YGSMRB), is responsible for mineral production.

== Commodities ==
Cobalt, copper, nickel reserves are found in three locations in the Al Masna’a, the Suwar, and the Wadi Qutabah in northeastern Yemen. Gold and silver have been identified in 40 locations and their extraction is now awaiting proposals under foreign investment; Al Hariqah gold deposit in northwest of Sana’a is a significant resource. Gold deposits exist in the Medden area, which is said to be the largest with a reserve of 678,000 tons where the average yield of 15 grams of gold and 11 grams of silver are estimated. Nine locations have been identified for mining of iron oxide, pigments and titanium; these are in the Mkiras region and in Um Halwal (Majil). The Jabali zinc and silver mine, to the northeast of Sana'a, has reserves of 12.6 million tons of oxide resources, though awarded for extraction, was under hibernation. Niobium and tantalum deposits are in Shabwah Province in southern Yemen.
