= Venus in culture =

Depictions in culture of the planet Venus

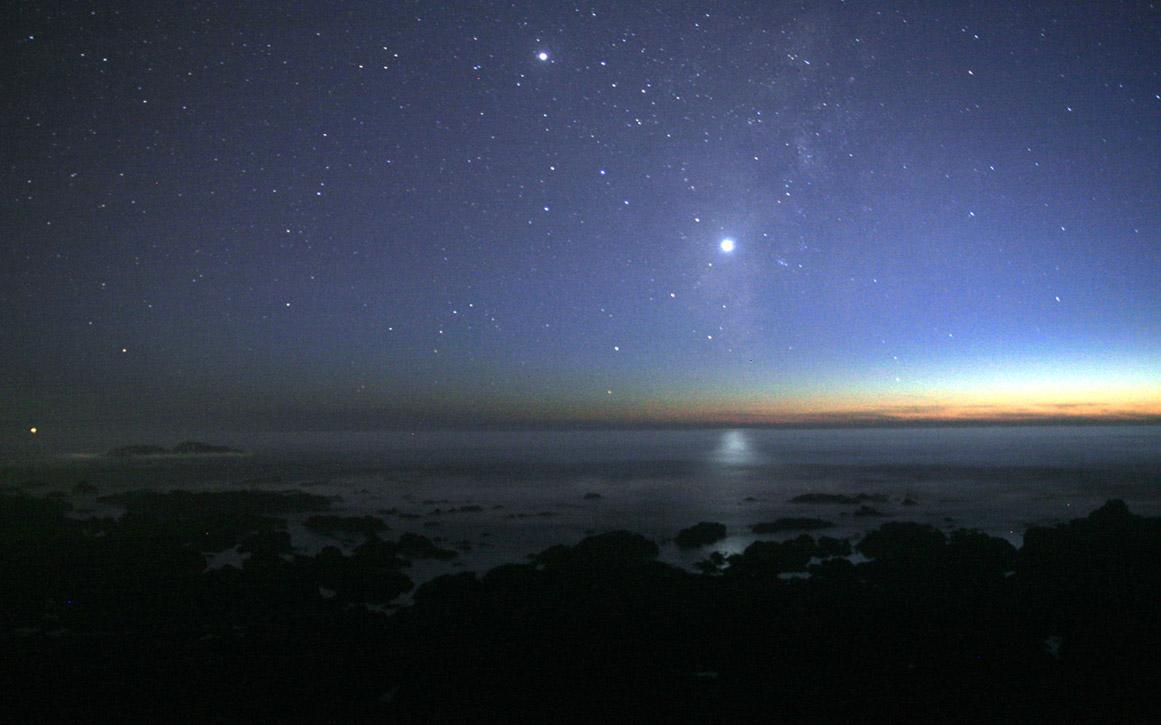
Venus is always brighter than the brightest stars outside the Solar System, as can be seen here over the Pacific Ocean

Venus, as one of the brightest objects in the sky, has been known since prehistoric times and has been a major fixture in human culture for as long as records have existed. As such, it has a prominent position in human culture, religion, and myth. It has been made sacred to gods of many cultures, and has been a prime inspiration for writers and poets as the morning star and evening star.

== Background and name ==
What is now known as the planet Venus has long been an object of fascination for cultures worldwide. It is the second brightest object in the night sky, and follows a synodic cycle by which it seems to disappear for several days due to its proximity to the Sun, then re-appear on the opposite side of the Sun and on the other horizon. Depending on the point in its cycle, Venus may appear before sunrise in the morning, or after sunset in the evening, but it never appears to reach the apex of the sky. Therefore, many cultures have recognized it with two names, even if their astronomers realized that it was really one object.

In Old English, the planet was known as morgensteorra (morning star) and æfensteorra (evening star). It was not until the 13th century C.E. that the name "Venus" was adopted for the planet. It was called Lucifer in classical Latin though the morning star was considered sacred to the goddess Venus.

In Chinese the planet is called Jīn-xīng (金星), the golden planet of the metal element. It is known as "Kejora" in Indonesian and Malaysian Malay. Modern Chinese, Japanese and Korean cultures refer to the planet literally as the "gold star" (金星), based on the Five elements.

== Ancient Near East ==
=== Mesopotamia ===
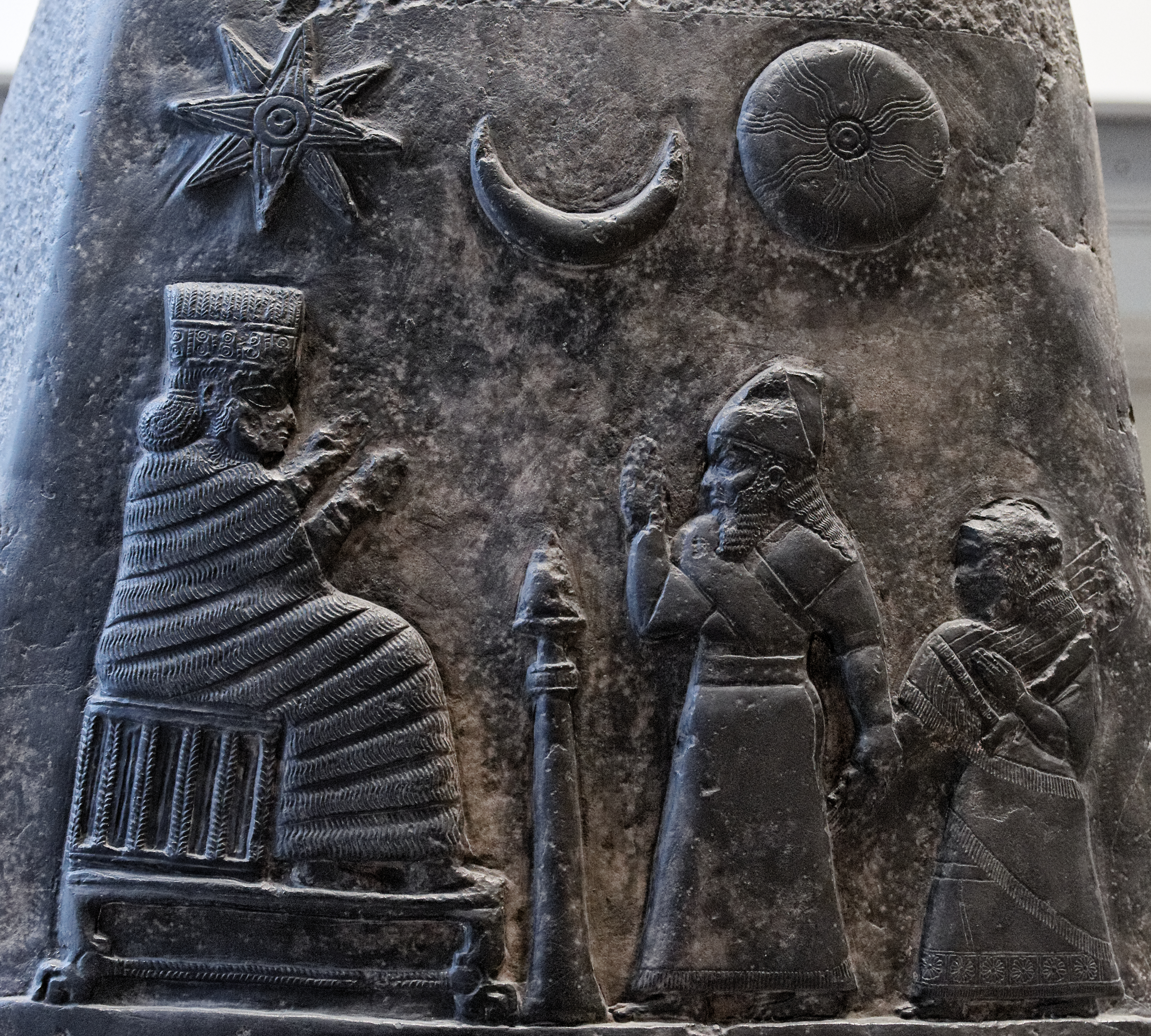
The eight-pointed star a symbol used in some cultures for Venus, and sometimes combined into a star and crescent arrangement. Here the eight pointed star is the Star of Ishtar, the Babylonian Venus goddess, alongside the solar disk of her brother Shamash and the crescent moon of their father Sin on a boundary stone of Meli-Shipak II, dating to the twelfth century BC.

Because the movements of Venus appear to be discontinuous (it disappears due to its proximity to the Sun, for many days at a time, and then reappears on the other horizon), some cultures did not recognize Venus as a single entity; instead, they assumed it to be two separate stars on each horizon: the morning and evening star. Nonetheless, a cylinder seal from the Jemdet Nasr period indicates that the ancient Sumerians already knew that the morning and evening stars were the same celestial object. The Sumerians associated the planet with the goddess Inanna, who was known as Ishtar by the later Akkadians and Babylonians. She had a dual role as a goddess of both love and war, thereby representing a deity that presided over birth and death.

The discontinuous movements of Venus relate to both Inanna's mythology as well as her dual nature. Inanna's actions in several of her myths, including Inanna and Shukaletuda and Inanna's Descent into the Underworld appear to parallel the motion of the planet Venus as it progresses through its synodic cycle. For example, in Inanna's Descent to the Underworld, Inanna is able to descend into the netherworld, where she is killed, and then resurrected three days later to return to the heavens. An interpretation of this myth by Clyde Hostetter holds that it is an allegory for the movements of the planet Venus, beginning with the spring equinox and concluding with a meteor shower near the end of one synodic period of Venus. The three-day disappearance of Inanna refers to the three-day planetary disappearance of Venus between its appearance as a morning and evening star. An introductory hymn to this myth describes Inanna leaving the heavens and heading for Kur, what could be presumed to be the mountains, replicating the rising and setting of Inanna to the West. In the myth Inanna and Shukaletuda, Shukaletuda is described as scanning the heavens in search of Inanna, possibly searching the eastern and western horizons. In the same myth, while searching for her attacker, Inanna herself makes several movements that correspond with the movements of Venus in the sky. Inanna-Ishtar's most common symbol was the eight-pointed star. The eight-pointed star seems to have originally borne a general association with the heavens, but, by the Old Babylonian Period (c. 1830 – c. 1531 BC), it had come to be specifically associated with the planet Venus, with which Ishtar was identified.

In the Old Babylonian period, the planet Venus was known as Ninsi'anna, and later as Dilbat. " Ninsi'anna" translates to "divine lady, illumination of heaven", which refers to Venus as the brightest visible "star". Earlier spellings of the name were written with the cuneiform sign si4 (= SU, meaning "to be red"), and the original meaning may have been "divine lady of the redness of heaven", in reference to the color of the morning and evening sky. Venus is described in Babylonian cuneiform texts such as the Venus tablet of Ammisaduqa, which relates observations that possibly date from 1600 BC. The Venus tablet of Ammisaduqa shows the Babylonians understood morning and evening star were a single object, referred to in the tablet as the "bright queen of the sky" or "bright Queen of Heaven", and could support this view with detailed observations.

=== Canaanite mythology ===
In ancient Canaanite religion, the morning star is personified as the god Attar, a masculine variant of the name of the Babylonian goddess Ishtar. In myth, Attar attempted to occupy the throne of Ba'al and, finding he was unable to do so, descended and ruled the underworld. The original myth may have been about a lesser god, Helel, trying to dethrone the Canaanite high god El, who was believed to live on a mountain to the north. Hermann Gunkel's reconstruction of the myth told of a mighty warrior called Hêlal, whose ambition was to ascend higher than all the other stellar divinities, but who had to descend to the depths. It thus portrayed as a battle the process by which the bright morning star fails to reach the highest point in the sky before being faded out by the rising sun.

Similarities have been noted with the story of Inanna's descent into the underworld, Ishtar and Inanna being associated with the planet Venus. A connection has been seen also with the Babylonian myth of Etana. The Jewish Encyclopedia comments:

"The brilliancy of the morning star, which eclipses all other stars, but is not seen during the night, may easily have given rise to a myth such as was told of Ethana and Zu: he was led by his pride to strive for the highest seat among the star-gods on the northern mountain of the gods ... but was hurled down by the supreme ruler of the Babylonian Olympus."

In the Hebrew language Book of Isaiah, chapter 14, the King of Babylon is condemned using imagery derived from Canaanite myth, and is called הֵילֵל בֶּן-שָׁחַר (Helel ben Shachar, Hebrew for "shining one, son of the morning"). The title "Helel ben Shahar" may refer to the planet Venus as the morning star. Helel ben Shahar was cast out of heaven for rebelling against Elion.

=== Egypt ===
The Ancient Egyptians possibly knew that the morning star (Tioumoutiri) and evening star (Ouaiti) were one and the same by the second millennium BC or at the latest by the Later Period under Mesopotamian influence. At first described as either a phoenix or heron (or Bennu), calling it "the crosser" or "star with crosses", and associated with Osiris, later during the Late Period under probably Mesopotamian influence Venus was depicted as a two-headed morning god (with human and falcon heads), as in the Dendera zodiac, and associated with Horus, son of Isis (which during the even later Hellenistic period was together with Hathor identified with Aphrodite).

== Ancient Greece and Rome ==
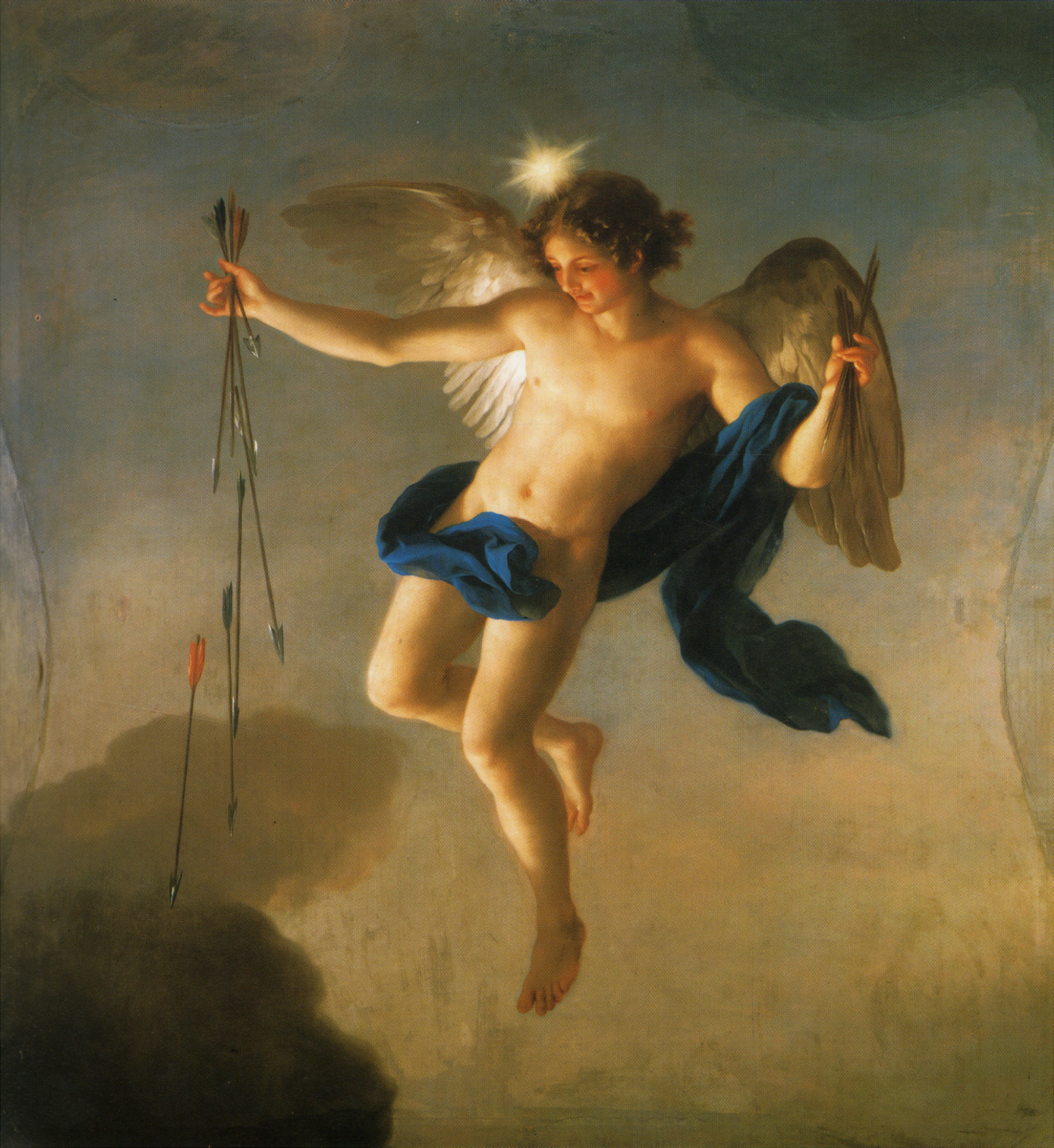
Hesperus as Personification of the Evening Star by Anton Raphael Mengs (1765).

The Ancient Greeks called the morning star Φωσφόρος, Phosphoros (epithet of Hecate), the "Bringer of Light". Another Greek name for the morning star was Heosphoros (Greek Ἑωσφόρος Heōsphoros), meaning "Dawn-Bringer". They called the evening star, which was long considered a separate celestial object, Hesperos (Ἓσπερος, the "star of the evening"). Both were children of dawn Eos and therefore grandchildren of Aphrodite. By Hellenistic times, the ancient Greeks had identified these as a single planet, though the traditional use of two names for its appearance in the morning and the evening continued even into the Roman period.

The Greek myth of Phaethon, whose name means "Shining One", has also been seen as similar to those of other gods who cyclically descend from the heavens, like Inanna and Attar.

In classical mythology, Lucifer ("light-bringer" in Latin) was the name of the planet Venus as the morning star (as the evening star it was called Vesper), and it was often personified as a male figure bearing a torch. Lucifer was said to be "the fabled son of Aurora and Cephalus, and father of Ceyx". He was often presented in poetry as heralding the dawn.

The Romans considered the planet Lucifer particularly sacred to the goddess Venus, whose name eventually became the scientific name for the planet. The second century Roman mythographer Pseudo-Hyginus said of the planet:

"The fourth star is that of Venus, Luciferus by name. Some say it is Juno's. In many tales it is recorded that it is called Hesperus, too. It seems to be the largest of all stars. Some have said it represents the son of Aurora and Cephalus, who surpassed many in beauty, so that he even vied with Venus, and, as Eratosthenes says, for this reason it is called the star of Venus. It is visible both at dawn and sunset, and so properly has been called both Luciferus and Hesperus."

Ovid, in his first century epic Metamorphoses, describes Lucifer as ordering the heavens:

"Aurora, watchful in the reddening dawn, threw wide her crimson doors and rose-filled halls; the Stellae took flight, in marshaled order set by Lucifer who left his station last."

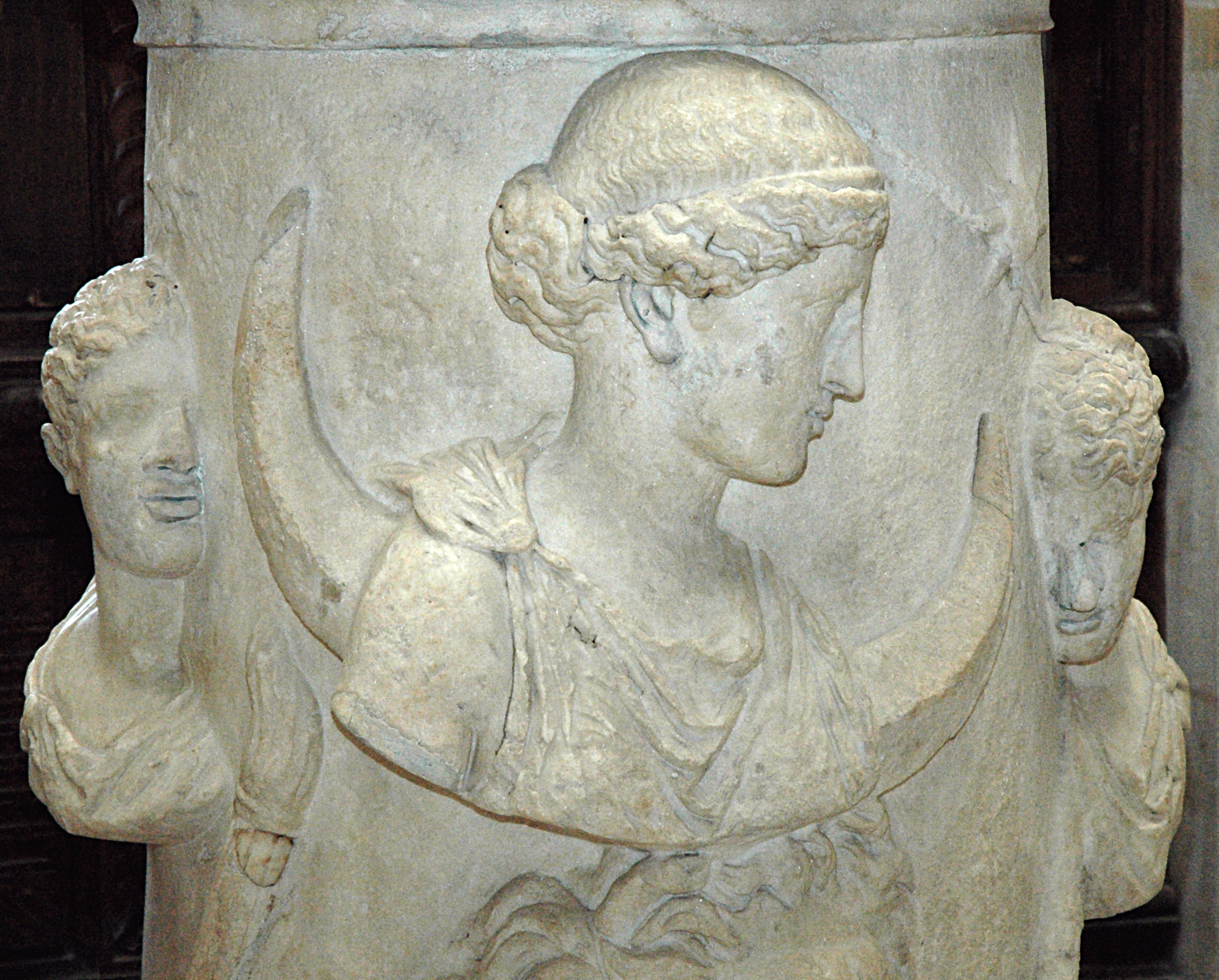
A 2nd-century Roman sculpture of the Moon-goddess Luna accompanied by the Dioscuri (Castor and Pollux), or Lucifer and Vesper. Marble altar, Roman artwork, 2nd century CE. From Italy

In the classical Roman period, Lucifer was not typically regarded as a deity and had few, if any, myths, though the planet was associated with various deities and often poetically personified. Cicero pointed out that "You say that Sol the Sun and Luna the Moon are deities, and the Greeks identify the former with Apollo and the latter with Diana. But if Luna (the Moon) is a goddess, then Lucifer (the Morning-Star) also and the rest of the Wandering Stars (Stellae Errantes) will have to be counted gods; and if so, then the Fixed Stars (Stellae Inerrantes) as well."

== Christianity ==
The Hebrew word transliterated as Hêlêl or Heylel (pron. as Hay-LALE), occurs only once in the Hebrew Bible. The Septuagint renders הֵילֵל in Greek as Ἑωσφόρος (heōsphoros), "bringer of dawn", the Ancient Greek name for the morning star. Aquila of Sinope derives the word hêlêl, the Hebrew name for the morning star, from the verb yalal (to lament). This derivation was adopted as a proper name for an angel who laments the loss of his former beauty. The Christian church fathers – for example Hieronymus, in his Vulgate – translated this as Lucifer. The equation of Lucifer with the fallen angel probably occurred in 1st century Palestinian Judaism. According to the King James Bible-based Strong's Concordance, the original Hebrew word means "shining one, light-bearer", and the translation given in the King James text is the Latin name for the planet Venus, "Lucifer". However, the translation of הֵילֵל with the name "Lucifer" has been abandoned in modern English translations of Isaiah 14:12. In a modern translation from the original Hebrew, the passage in which the name Helel ben Shahar occurs begins with the statement: "On the day the Lord gives you relief from your suffering and turmoil and from the harsh labour forced on you, you will take up this taunt against the king of Babylon: How the oppressor has come to an end! How his fury has ended!" After describing the death of the king, the taunt continues:

"How you have fallen from heaven, morning star, son of the dawn! You have been cast down to the earth, you who once laid low the nations! You said in your heart, 'I will ascend to the heavens; I will raise my throne above the stars of God; I will sit enthroned on the mount of assembly, on the utmost heights of Mount Zaphon. I will ascend above the tops of the clouds; I will make myself like the Most High.' But you are brought down to the realm of the dead, to the depths of the pit. Those who see you stare at you, they ponder your fate: 'Is this the man who shook the earth and made kingdoms tremble, the man who made the world a wilderness, who overthrew its cities and would not let his captives go home?'"

This passage was the origin of the later belief that the Devil was a fallen angel, who could also be referred to as "Lucifer". However, it originally referred to the rise and disappearance of the morning star as an allegory for the fall of a once-proud king. This allegorical understanding of Isaiah seems to be the most accepted interpretation in the New Testament, as well as among early Christians such as Origen, Eusebius, Tertullian, and Gregory the Great. The fallen angel motif may therefore be considered a Christian "remythologization" of Isaiah 14, returning its allegorical imagery of the hubris of a historical ruler to the original roots of the Canaanite myth of a lesser god trying and failing to claim the throne of the heavens, who is then cast down to the underworld.

== Vietnam ==
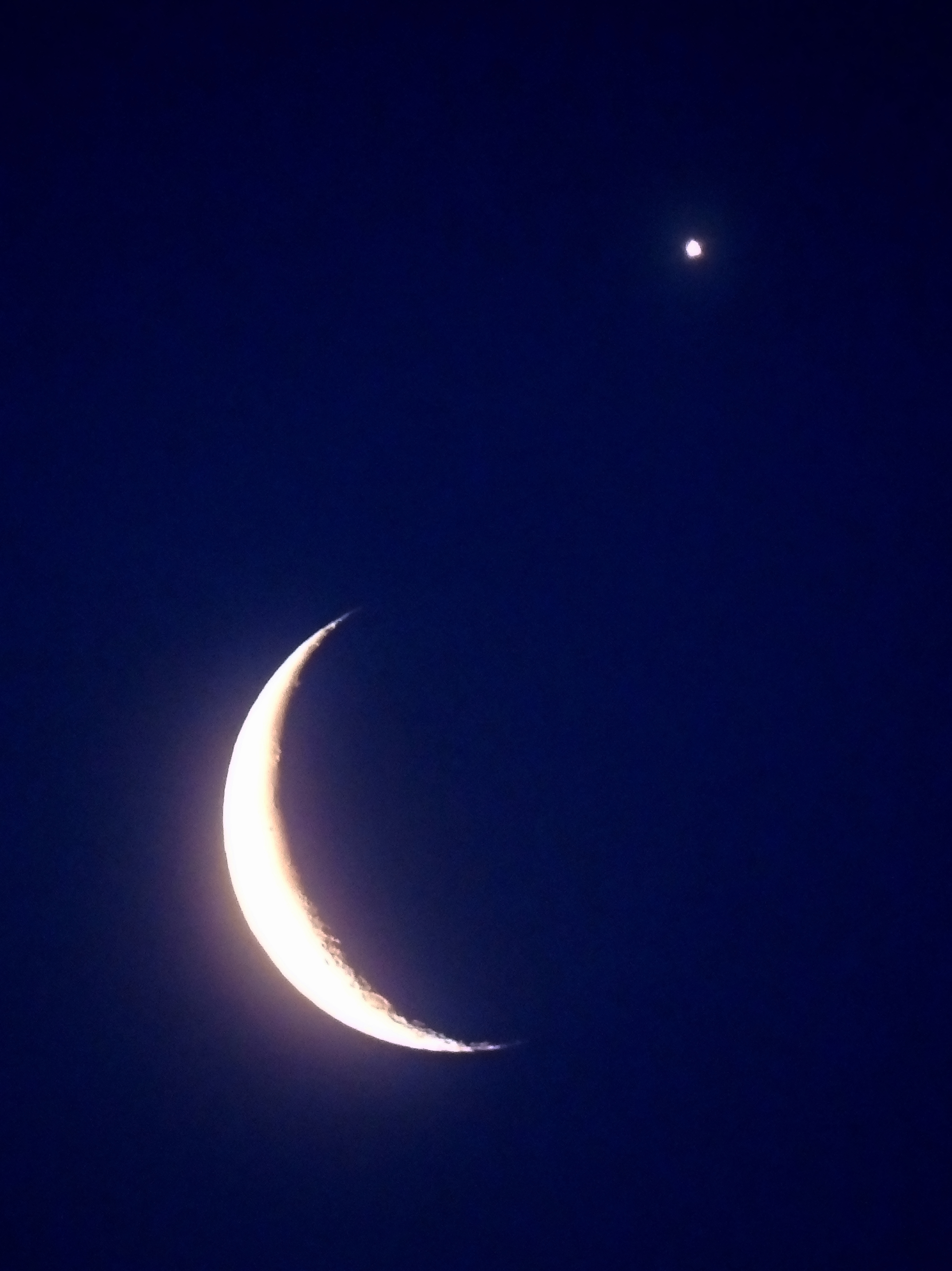
The Moon pictured alongside Venus.

In Vietnamese folklore, the planet was regarded as two separate bodies: the morning star (sao Mai) and the evening star (sao Hôm). Due to the position of these supposedly distinct bodies in the sky, they went down in folk poetry as a metaphor for separation, especially that between lovers.

When it was in the opposite direction of the Moon, the planet was also known as sao Vượt (the climbing/passing star, also spelled as sao Vược due to different Quốc ngữ interpretations of one Nôm character). Such an opposition, much like that between the morning star and the evening star, has also been likened in folk poetry to the separation of ill-fated lovers, as evidenced by this lục bát couplet:

"Mình đi có nhớ ta chăng?
Ta như sao Vượt chờ trăng giữa trời."
(When you go, do you miss me?
I am the climbing star waiting for the moon in the sky.)

== Hinduism ==
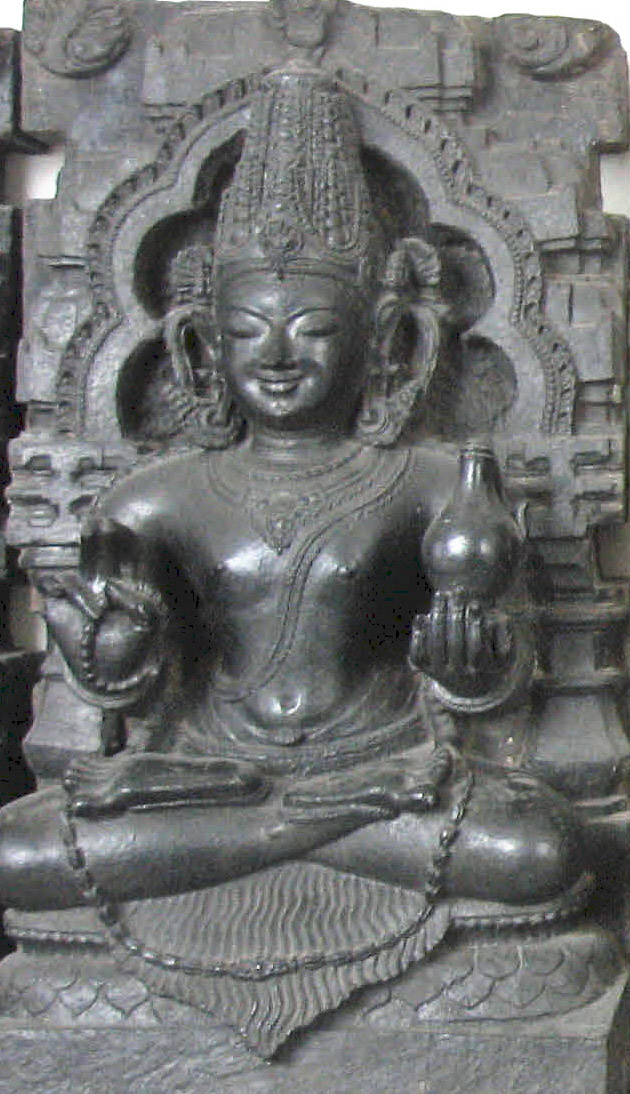
Shukra is the Sanskrit name for Venus

In India, Venus is named Shukra Graha ("the planet Shukra") after a powerful saint Shukra. Shukra which is used in Vedic astrology means "clear, pure" or "brightness, clearness" in Sanskrit. One of the nine Navagraha, it is held to affect wealth, pleasure and reproduction; it was the son of Bhrgu, preceptor of the Daityas, and guru of the Asuras. The word Shukra is also associated with semen, or generation.

== Persia ==
In Iranian mythology, especially in Persian mythology, the planet usually corresponds to the goddess Anahita. In some parts of Pahlavi literature the deities Aredvi Sura and Anahita are regarded as separate entities, the first one as a personification of the mythical river and the latter as a goddess of fertility, which is associated with the planet Venus. As the goddess Aredvi Sura Anahita—and simply called Anahita as well—both deities are unified in other descriptions, e. g. in the Greater Bundahishn, and are represented by the planet. In the Avestan text Mehr Yasht (Yasht 10) there is a possible early link to Mithra. The Persian name of the planet today is "Nahid", which derives from Anahita and later in history from the Pahlavi language Anahid.

== Türk mythology ==
The deity Erkliğ Han (the Powerful) was identified with Venus as a great warrior. He was responsible for killing the stars when the sun rises. For this reason, he was a symbol for warriors in general. In the 11th century Turkic Kutadgu Bilig, under cross-cultural influences of Greek and Sumerian mythology, Venus became associated with love, beauty, and fertility.

== Islam ==
In Islamic traditions the morning star is called زُهْرَة, الزُّهَرَة Zohrah or Az-Zuharah literally meaning "The Beautiful White One" and commonly related to a "beautiful woman". According to myth, of which an echo is found in a play by the 17th-century English poet William Percy, two angels, Harut and Marut, descended to earth and were seduced by Zohrah's beauty to commit shirk, murder, adultery and drinking wine. In their drunken state, Zohrah elicited from these angels the secret words to ascend to heaven. When she spoke the secret words, she elevated herself to the first heaven, but was imprisoned there (i.e. transformed into the planet Venus).

According to tafsir, some say that the woman literally became the morning star, as a reflection of her ability to blend the angels. Others say that during her ascent, she was imprisoned on the planet and is tortured there.

== Maya ==
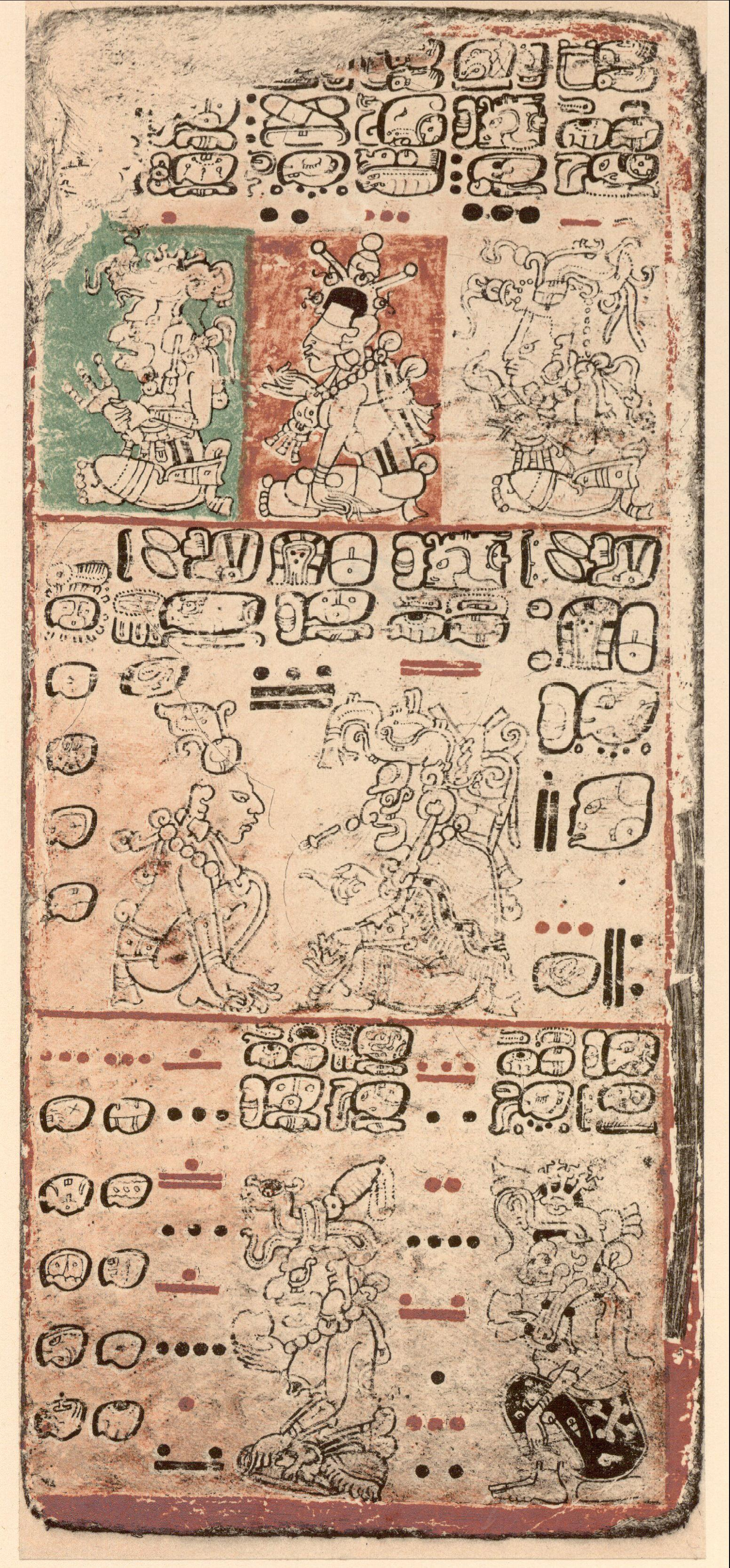
The Pre-Columbian Mayan Dresden Codex, which calculates Venus appearances

Venus was considered the most important celestial body observed by the Maya, who called it Chac ek, or Noh Ek', "the Great Star". The Maya monitored the movements of Venus closely and observed it in daytime. The positions of Venus and other planets were thought to influence life on Earth. Especially, it was believed in Maya that Venus controls rainfall, so the amount of rain was predicted by farmers through the observation of Venus. In fact, Chicchan serpent, a Maya deity of Venus, plays also role on yielding rainfall, suggesting that the management of Venus parallels rain. Thus, the Maya and other ancient Mesoamerican cultures timed wars and other important events based on their observations. In the Dresden Codex, the Maya included an almanac showing Venus's full cycle, in five sets of 584 days each (approximately eight years), after which the patterns repeated (since Venus has a synodic period of 583.92 days).

The Maya civilization developed a religious calendar, based in part upon the motions of the planet, and held the motions of Venus to determine the propitious time for events such as war. They also named it Xux Ek', the Wasp Star. The Maya were aware of the planet's synodic period, and could compute it to within a hundredth part of a day.

== Other cultures ==
In traditional Lakota star knowledge, the planet Venus is named Aŋpo Wiŋ or the Light of Dawn (sometimes also translated as Morningstar). It is believed to be a male Nāgī controlling beginnings, fate and all things cyclical. He is also sometimes credited as the father of Star Boy.

The Maasai people named the planet Kileken, and have an oral tradition about it called The Orphan Boy.

Venus is important in many Australian aboriginal cultures, such as that of the Yolngu people in Northern Australia. The Yolngu gather after sunset to await the rising of Venus, which they call Barnumbirr. As she approaches, in the early hours before dawn, she draws behind her a rope of light attached to the Earth, and along this rope, with the aid of a richly decorated "Morning Star Pole", the people are able to communicate with their dead loved ones, showing that they still love and remember them. Barnumbirr is also an important creator-spirit in the Dreaming, and "sang" much of the country into life.

Venus plays a prominent role in Pawnee mythology. One specific group of Pawnee, a North American native tribe, until as late as 1838, practiced a morning star ritual in which a girl was sacrificed to the morning star.

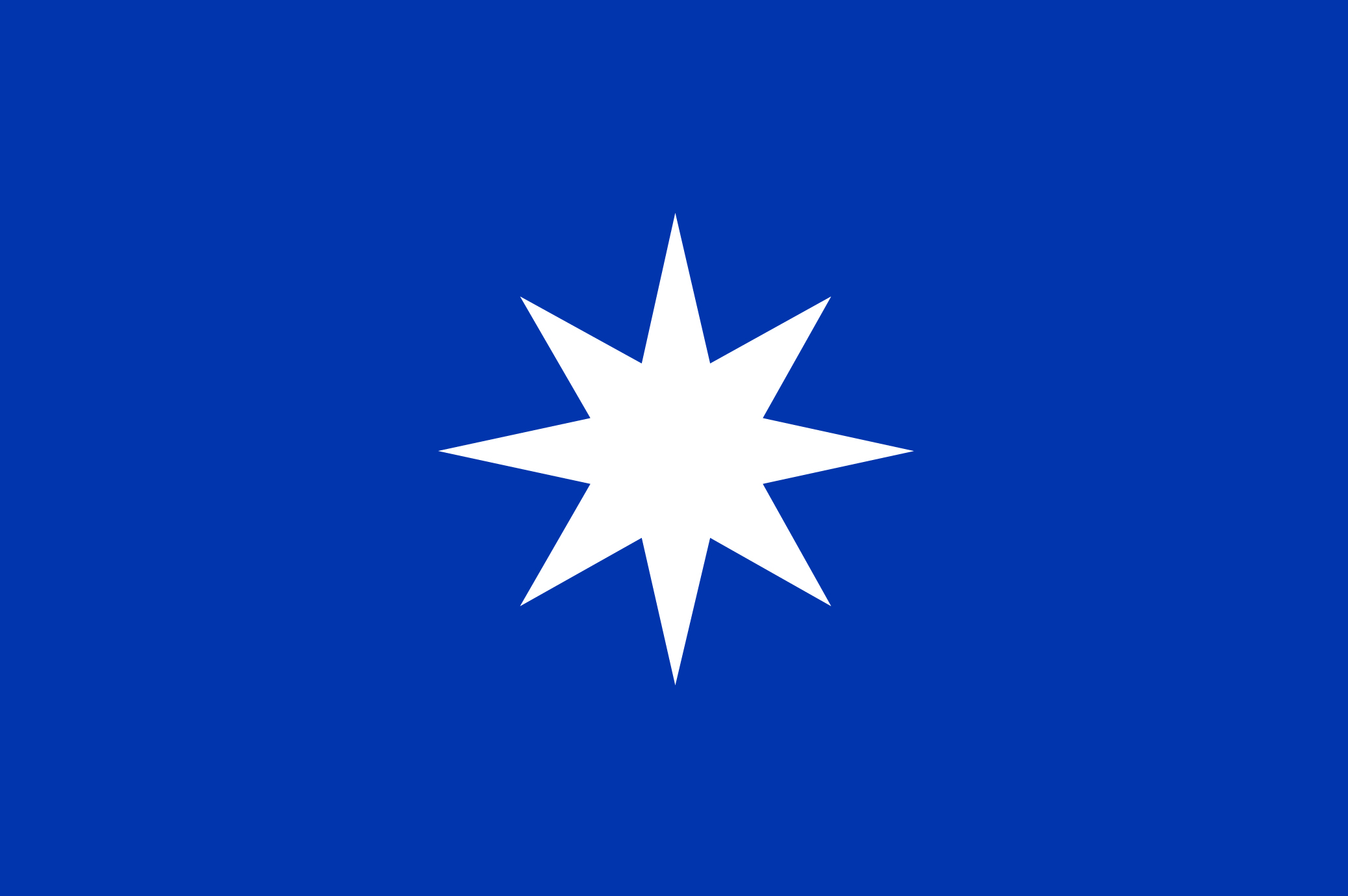
One of the Mapuche flags used depicting Venus or Wüñelfe.

Among the Mapuche of south-central Chile and southwestern Argentina; the planet or Wünelve ("the First") is believed to have existed when spirits were attempting to ascend back from the World Below or Minchemapu after falling from the Middle World or Rangimapu; the planet is believed to be an amalgamation of some of those spirits who were stuck on their way. The planet is an important symbol for this people; it was eventually incorporated into the flag of Chile simplified as a five-pointed star symbolizing a beacon of progress and honor.

In western astrology, derived from its historical connotation with goddesses of femininity and love, Venus is held to influence desire and sexual fertility.

In the metaphysical system of Theosophy, it is believed that on the etheric plane of Venus there is a civilization that existed hundreds of millions of years before Earth's and it is also believed that the governing deity of Earth, Sanat Kumara, is from Venus.

== In fiction ==
The discovery in the modern era that Venus was a distant world covered in impenetrable cloud cover gave science fiction writers free rein to speculate on conditions at its surface; all the more so when early observations showed that not only was it similar in size to Earth, it possessed a substantial atmosphere. Closer to the Sun than Earth, the planet was frequently depicted as warmer, but still habitable by humans. The genre reached its peak between the 1930s and 1950s, at a time when science had revealed some aspects of Venus, but not yet the harsh reality of its surface conditions. Findings from the first missions to Venus showed the reality to be quite different, and brought this particular genre to an end. As scientific knowledge of Venus advanced, science fiction authors tried to keep pace, particularly by conjecturing human attempts to terraform Venus.

=== In humour ===
Scientists who had reported 2020 possible signs of life in the clouds of Venus stated that the found biosignature phosphine is found on Earth and among others produced by penguins. Subsequently some public news reports and public responses wrongly cited the scientists' interest in the processes that create phosphine, suggesting that penguins lived in the clouds of Venus. The Planetary Society picked up on the misunderstanding for entertainment purposes.
