= Kingdom of Hadhramaut =

Ancient Yemeni kingdom

Ḥaḍramawt 𐩢𐩳𐩧𐩣𐩩
- Early 1st millennium BCE–c. 290 CE
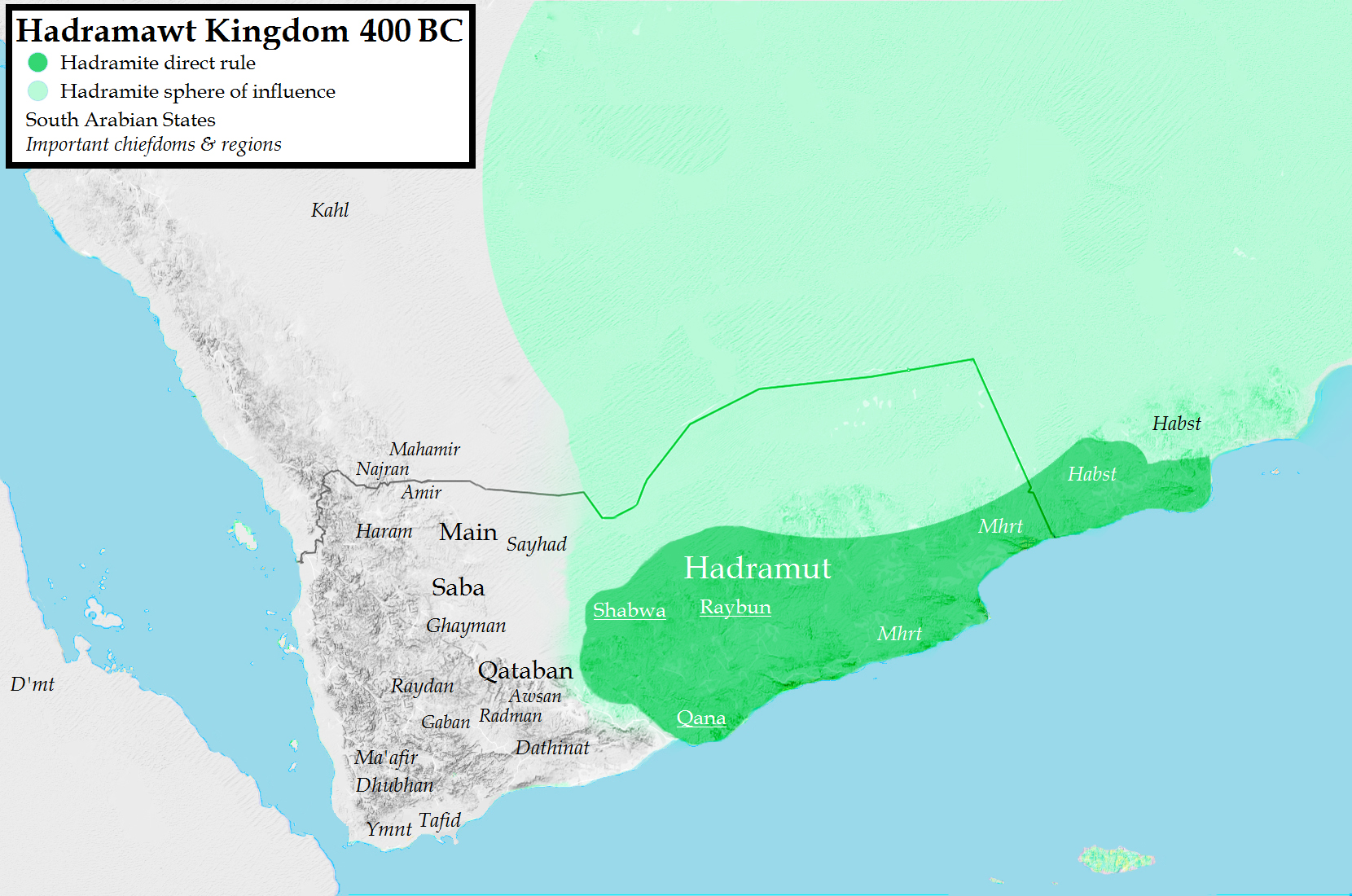
- Ḥaḍramawt in 400 BCE
- Capital: Šabwat; Shibam
- Common languages: Ḥaḑramitic
- Religion: South Arabian polytheism
- Demonym: Hadhramite
- Government: Kingdom
- Historical era: Iron Age; Classical Antiquity
  - Established: Early 1st millennium BCE
  - Disestablished: c. 290 CE
Preceded by	Succeeded by
Qataban	Ḥimyar
- Today part of: Yemen; Oman

Ḥaḍramawt (Hadrami: 𐩢𐩳𐩧𐩣𐩩, romanized: ḥḍrmt; Sabaic, Minaic, Qatabānic: 𐩢𐩳𐩧𐩣𐩥𐩩, romanized: ḥḍrmwt) was an ancient South Semitic-speaking kingdom of South Arabia (ancient Yemen) which existed from the early 1st millennium BCE till the late 3rd century CE in the area currently named after it in the region of the Ṣayhad desert.

The kingdom of Ḥaḍramawt was one of the six ancient South Arabian kingdoms of ancient Yemen, along with Sabaʾ, Maʿīn, Qatabān, Ḥimyar, and Awsān. Little is known about Ḥaḍramawt compared to the other early South Arabian states.

== Geography ==
The kingdom of Ḥaḍramawt was the easternmost of the ancient South Arabian kingdoms, with its core being centred around the Wādī Ḥaḍramawt and the Wādī al-Masīla, and in the east and the south it was bordered by the Indian Ocean. Its capital was the city of Šabwat.

== History ==
=== Prehistory ===
The earliest human activities in the region date from the Middle Palaeolithic, with the local population using a Levallois technique for flake preparation until the appearance of tools produced by a desert-dwelling pre-agricultural population. From this latter period, or perhaps the succeeding one, can be dated several megalithic structures, large stone circles, and four dolmen-like strictures whose inner surfaces were decorated with repetitive rows of pecked meander or crenellated design.

=== Kingdom ===
In the late 7th century BCE, Ḥaḍramawt and the nearby kingdom of Qatabān were initially allies of the king Karibʾil Watar of the neighbouring kingdom of Sabaʾ, but by the 6th century BCE, Ḥaḍramawt and Qatabān had come under the control of Sabaʾ.

After Ḥaḍramawt and Qatabān regained their independence from Sabaʾ in the early or late 5th century BCE, the Ḥaḍramites, Qatabānians and Minaeans together rejected the hegemony of Sabaʾ to instead became the dominant states of the South Arabian region, and the names of the rulers of Ḥaḍramawt are first attested by name beginning in the 5th century BCE.

Qatabān soon embarked on a successful expansionist policy against Sabaʾ and was challenging the supremacy of Sabaʾ in South Arabia, and at one point in the 1st century BCE, Ḥaḍramawt joined a coalition formed by Qatabān, Radman, Maḏay, and the Arab nomads against the Sabaeans.

The Ḥaḍramite king Īlʿazz Yaliṭ II, who reigned around c. 220 CE is recorded as having organised a royal hunt during which were present two Palmyrene delegates, two Chaldaean delegates, and two South Asian delegates.

Like Sabaʾ, Ḥaḍramawt often imposed its overlordship over the Arab tribes living to the north of the South Arabian kingdoms.

During this period, from the 4th to 2nd centuries BCE, Ḥaḍramawt experienced a period of prosperity, and several fortifications and both secular and religious buildings were built in its territory.

The Ḥaḍramite king Yadʿʾil Bayan rebuilt the state's capital city of Šabwat.

With the establishment of direct maritime trade links between the Mediterranean and South Asia via the Red Sea in the late Hellenistic period, the tribes of the South Arabian highland became ascendant at the expense of the kingdoms of the Sayhad. To participate in the new commercial developments, Ḥaḍramawt established two sea ports on the Indian Ocean, one at Qanīʾ and the second at Sumhuram.

Ḥaḍramawt and Ḥimyar divided the territories of Qatabān among themselves and annexed them in the late 1st or 2nd century CE.

Ḥaḍramawt itself was soon ceased to exist as an independent polity when it was annexed around c. 290 CE by the Ḥimyarite king Šammar Yuharʿiš, who styled himself as King of Sabaʾ and Ḏū-Raydān and Ḥaḍramawt and Yamanat in an inscription from 299 CE.

=== Legacy ===
Ḥaḍramawt is mentioned in the Table of Nations of the Hebrew Bible under the name of Hazarmaveth (Biblical Hebrew: חֲצַרְמָוֶת, romanized: Ḥăṣarmāweṯ), as one of the thirteen sons of Yoqṭān descended from Šēm through ʿĒḇer.

The Graeco-Roman author Strabo referred to Ḥaḍramawt under the name of Khatramōtítis (Χατραμωτίτις).

== Society and culture ==
=== Culture ===
Like the other neighbouring states of Qatabān, Sabaʾ, Maʿīn, and Ḥimyar, the kingdom of Ḥaḍramawt belonged to the ancient South Arabian culture and developed as part of it, albeit with its own minor iterations of this culture.

=== Language ===
The people of Ḥaḍramawt spoke the Hadramautic language, which belonged to the Old South Arabian branch of the Semitic languages.

=== Social organisation ===
Ḥaḍramawt was a monarchical state. The various other offices of the kingdom included that of the kabīr (lit. 'elder'), a senior official who could head a tribe or a professional group or be the king's agent.

=== Religion ===
The Ḥaḍramites practised South Arabian polytheism, and the god 𐩲𐩻𐩩𐩧 (ʿAṯtar), who held a supreme position within the cosmology of the ancient South Arabians as the god presiding over the whole world, always appeared first in lists, and had various manifestations with their own epithets, also held this primacy within the religion of Ḥaḍramawt. And, like in the other South Arabian states, the rulers of Ḥaḍramawt would offer ritual banquets in honour of ʿAṯtar, with the banquet being paid for from the tithe offered to the god by the populace.

The patron deity of the Ḥaḍramites, however, was the Moon-god 𐪊𐪚𐩬 (Sayīn), who was seen as being closer to the people compared to the more distant figure of ʿAṯtar, and the people of Ḥaḍramawt consequently called themselves the "children of Sayīn." Other deities known to have been worshipped in Ḥaḍramawt include the Sun-goddess 𐩦𐩣𐩪 (Šams).

The religious practises of the people of Ḥaḍramawt made use of similar cult equipment as the other ancient South Arabian states, and professional priestesses are recorded to have existed in Ḥaḍramawt, where they participated in the social life of the community, such as arbitrating marital dispute cases.

The Ḥaḍramites followed the South Arabian custom of dedicating themselves and their close family members to the deities, and especially to Sayīn, as a way of showing their allegiance to the religious community and to receive the deities' protections.

The people of Ḥaḍramawt performed ritual hunts dedicated to their deities, the faithful accomplishment of which was believed to bring divine blessings, and the king Yadʿʾil Bayan is recorded as having gone on hunts where he killed oryxes, gazelles, cheetahs, panthers, and ibexes. This tradition lasted even after the end of the kingdom of Ḥaḍramawt, with the inhabitants of the region believing until recently that hunting was a prerequisite for bringing rainfall, and consequently avoiding drought and resulting famine.

=== Architecture ===
The architecture of Ḥaḍramawt was similar to that of the other ancient South Arabian states, although unique to its capital of Šabwat were several tall multi-storey buildings, with the structure of a six-stories high palace in the city consisting of a post-and-beam framework similar to modern-day steel frameworks made of massive wooden beams which had been assembled with tongue and groove and pegs, as well as of brick curtain walls.

=== Economy ===
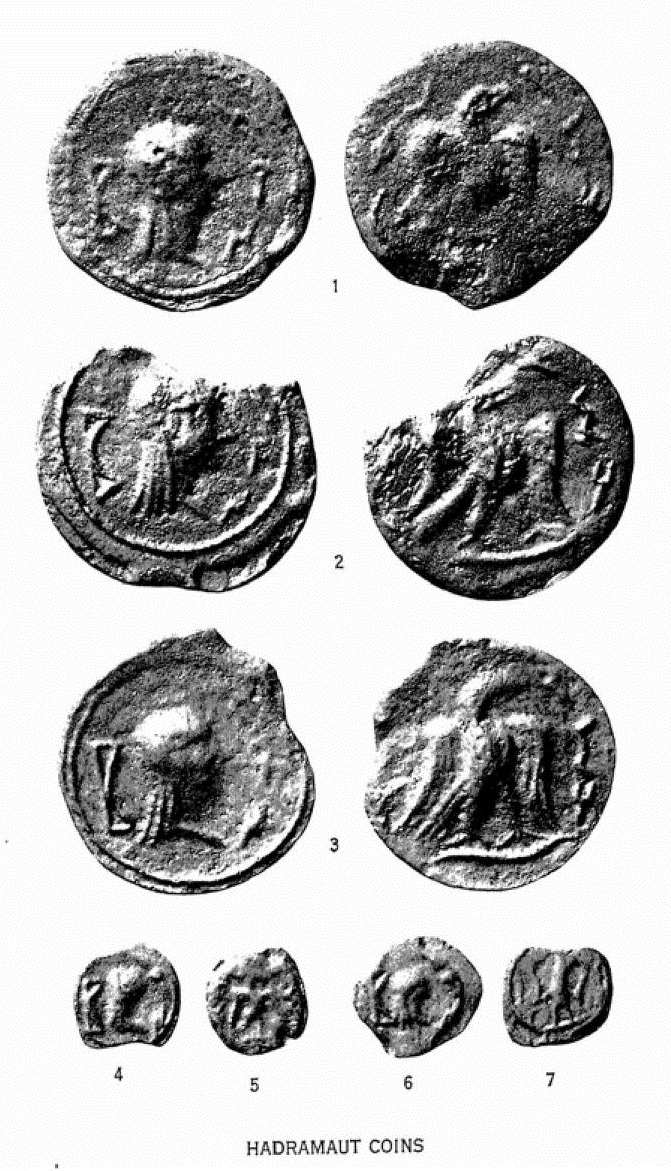
Coins from Hadhramaut

Like the other South Arabian states, Ḥaḍramawt practised agriculture which required flash-flood and well irrigation techniques. Ḥaḍramawt produced aromatics, especially frankincense, which were cultivated in the Ẓufār region which formed part of its territory; the Graeco-Roman author Pliny the Elder mentioned Astramitica (Ḥaḍramawtic) as a variety of myrrh.

Once harvested, these aromatics were brought to the port of Sumhuram, from where they were shipped to Qanīʾ, where the tradesmen of the Incense trade route picked them and brought them north to Šabwat, and then through Qatabān, Sabaʾ and Maʿīn, before heading north towards the oases where lived the Arabs; Ḥaḍramawt's capital of Šabwat thus formed the beginning of the Incense Route which ran through the western border of the Arabian Desert until the Mediterranean port of Gaza, as well as of another incense trading route which ran to the north-east until Gerrha, due to which Ḥaḍramawt also derived significant revenue from the transit through its territory of merchant caravans trading incense produced in Ẓufār and luxuries imported from South Asia, which allowed it to act as a mediator in this trade route, thus bringing significant wealth and exotic displays to its ruling classes and institutions.

Trade in South Arabia was initially done by barter in goods against standards of gold or silver or bronze by weight, but in the 4th or 3rd century BCE the kingdoms of the region started minting their own coinage, which were based on Athenian Greek ones. In the 1st century BCE, Ḥaḍramawt replaced these with its own Roman-inspired coinage which were struck with its royal mint's name of Šaqir.

== List of rulers ==
Known rulers of Ḥaḍramawt include:

- Yadʿʾil (contemporary of Karibʾil Watar of Sabaʾ)
- Ṣidqʾil (ruled over both Ḥaḍramawt and Maʿīn)
- Šahrʿalan, son of Ṣidqʾil
- Maʿdikarib, son of Šahrʿalan's brother, the king Ilyafiʿ Yiṯiʿ of Maʿīn
- Ġaylān
- Yadʿʾab Ġaylān I, son of Ġaylān (ally of ʿAlhān Nahfān of Sabaʾ)
- Īlʿazz Yaliṭ I (contemporary of Šaʿirum Awtar of Sabaʾ)
- Īlʿazz Yaliṭ II (contemporary of Ṯaʾrān Yaʿib Yuhanʿim of Sabaʾ)
- Yadʿʾab Ġaylān II
- Yadʿʾil Bayan I, son of Yadʿʾab Ġaylān
- Yadʿʾil Bayan II (co-ruler with ʾIlsamaʿ Ḏubyān)
- ʾIlsamaʿ Ḏubyān (co-ruler with Yadʿʾil Bayan II)
- Rabšams
- Yadʿʾil Bayan III
- Ilriyām Yadum
- Yadʿʾab Ġaylān III

== Bibliography ==
- Albright, W. F. (1950). "The Chronology of Ancient South Arabia in the Light of the First Campaign of Excavation in Qataban". Bulletin of the American Schools of Oriental Research. 119 (119): 5–15. doi:10.2307/3218798. JSTOR 3218798. S2CID 163250611.
- Bryce, Trevor (2009). The Routledge Handbook of the Peoples and Places of Ancient Western Asia: From the Early Bronze Age to the Fall of the Persian Empire. London, United Kingdom: Routledge. ISBN 978-0-415-39485-7.
- Hoyland, Robert G. (2002). Arabia and the Arabs: From the Bronze Age to the Coming of Islam. London, United Kingdom: Routledge. ISBN 978-1-134-64634-0.
- Kitchen, Kenneth (2001). "Economics in Ancient Arabia from Alexander to the Augustans". In Archibald, Zofia H.; Davies, John; Gabrielsen, Vincent; Oliver, G. J. (eds.). Hellenistic Economies. London, United Kingdom: Routledge. pp. 119–132. ISBN 978-1-134-56592-4.
- Van Beek, Gus W. (1997). "Ḥadhramaut". In Dever, William G.; Meyers, Carol L.; Muhly, James D.; Pardee, Dennis; Sauer, James A.; Finney, Paul Corby; Jorgensen, John S. (eds.). The Oxford Encyclopedia of Archaeology in the Near East. Vol. 2. Oxford, United Kingdom; New York City, United States: Oxford University Press. pp. 452–453.
