= Beher (god) =

Ethiopian Aksumite god

Beher was the pre-Christian Eritrean and Ethiopian (Aksumite) god of the sea. He was part of a trinity of pre-Christian Eritrean and Ethiopian religion, together with Astar (god of sun and moon) and Mahrem (god of war and head god). Beher may be related to one of the main Tewahedo Christian terms for god, egziabher.

== History ==
Beher is the god of the land and of the sea and is associated with agricultural fertility. He is also identified with Meder, the earth mother. All of these names appear together in the writings of Ezana of Axum, in which the throne is dedicated to Astar, Beher, and Meder. For the Aksumites, these gods are comparable to the Greeks'. Astar was associated with Zeus while Mahrem was parallel with Ares. Beher was associated to Poseidon.

Beher and other gods of this religion likely had animal sacrifices made in their honor, mostly cattle or possibly votives as representations for those animals. Though its etymology is unknown, his name likely stems from the Ethio-Semitic word for the sea, or a large body of water generally (Amharic: ባሕር; bahər, Ge'ez: ባሕር; baḥr) which itself comes from West Semitic *baḥr-, an allusion to his association with the sea.
