= Peter Broggs =

- Born: Henry Hugh James; 3 July 1952; Hanover Parish, Jamaica
- Died: 19 December 2015 (aged 63)
- Genres: Reggae
- Years active: 1970s–2015
- Label: RAS Records
- Website: www.peterbroggs.com

Henry Hugh James (3 July 1952 – 19 December 2015), better known as Peter Broggs, was a Jamaican roots reggae vocalist and songwriter.

== Life ==
Born in 1952 in Hanover Parish, Jamaica, in the early 1970s, Broggs moved to Kingston to seek out business opportunities.

Recorded at King Tubby's, engineered by Scientist and backed by Roots Radics, Broggs' debut album Progressive Youth, was released in 1979 on the UK Greensleeves label, featuring a version of Tony Brevett's hit, Don't Get Weary ( also versioned by Tapper Zukie ). The song "Jah Golden Throne" was recorded at the Channel One Studios and King Tubby studios then released in the UK on the short-lived roots reggae and dub Selena record label in 1980. His Rastafari Liveth! album, recorded with Roots Radics, was the first release on RAS Records in 1982. On his 1990 album Reasoning, Broggs was backed by The Wailers and Roots Radics. In 2000 he released Jah Golden Throne, a collaboration with Jah Warrior, in both vocal and dub versions.

Broggs suffered a stroke on 27 August 2004 which left him paralyzed on the right side and hardly able to speak. The album Igziabeher Yakal released in 2005 was recorded with dubcreator at the DC studio for sound system team King Shiloh in Amsterdam in 2002 where the profit helped to cover Broggs' medical expenses.

Peter Broggs died on 19 December 2015, aged 63.

== Discography ==
- Progressive Youth (1979), Greensleeves
- Rastafari Liveth (1982), RAS
- Rise and Shine (1985), RAS
- Cease the War (1987), RAS
- Reasoning (1990), RAS
- Reggae In Blues (1993), Déclic
- Peter Broggs Sings for the Children (1993), Golden Harvest
- Rejoice (1997), RAS
- Jah Golden Throne (2000), Jah Warrior
- Jah Golden Throne Dubwise (2000), Jah Warrior
- Igzabihir Yakal (2005), King Shiloh
- Fire Fe Lucifer (2009), Jah Warrior
- Never Give Up (2009), Jah Warrior

Compilations

- RAS Portraits: Peter Broggs (1997), RAS
- Never Forget Jah - The Early Years 1976-1986 (2001), Nocturne
- This Is Crucial Reggae (2005), Sabctuary
