= Pierre Grelot =

French Roman Catholic priest, biblical scholar and theologian (1917–2009)

- Born: 6 February 1917; Paris, France
- Died: 22 June 2009 (aged 92); Orléans, France
- Occupations: Priest; biblical scholar; theologian

Ecclesiastical career
- Religion: Catholic Church
- Title: Honorary Professor at the Institut Catholique de Paris

Pierre Grelot (6 February 1917 – 22 June 2009) was a French Catholic priest, biblical scholar, theologian and Honorary Professor at the Institut Catholique de Paris. He had an expert knowledge of Aramaic and was a specialist on the Pauline epistles.

== Early life and education ==
Grelot was born 6 February 1917 in Paris, France.

Grelot studied at St. Louis School, in Montargis. He was ordained a Catholic priest in 1941. He became a teacher at the Seminary of Orléans and afterwards at the Institut Catholique de Paris, from 1961 to 1983. He became an honorary teacher of the Institute in 1985.

== Career ==
He presented his thesis in theology, Èxègese Littérale, Éxègese Spirituelle ("Literal Exegesis, Spiritual Exegesis"), in 1949. He had an important role in the renewal of the Biblical studies in France with his books, Introduction aux Livres Saints ("Introduction to the Holy Books", 1954) and Pages Bibliques ("Biblical Pages", 1954), which were reissued several times and had translations in several different languages.

Grelot was a counselor of the Bishops' Conference of France and a member of the Pontifical Biblical Commission, from 1972 to 1983.

He participated in the TV series Corpus Christi (1997), exhibited at the Arte channel, about the Gospels.

He was quoted by Pope Benedict XVI in his book Jesus of Nazareth (2007).

He had controversies with other biblical scholars who opposed a late dating of the New Testament writings; he wrote his book L'origine des Évangiles (1985) in opposition to the view held by Jean Carmignac.

== Death ==
He died on 22 June 2009 in Orléans.

== Works ==
- Dialogues avec un musulman, Cerf, Paris, 2004.
- Une lecture de l'épître aux Hébreux, Éditions du Cerf, 2003.
- Le langage symbolique dans la Bible, Éditions du Cerf, 2001.
- L'Épître de saint Paul aux Romains. Une lecture pour aujourd'hui, Éditions Saint-Paul, 2001.
- Corps et sang du Christ en gloire, Éditions du Cerf, 1999.
- Jésus de Nazareth, Christ et Seigneur, Éditions du Cerf, vol. I 1997, vol. II 1998.
- La Science face à la foi, Lettre ouverte à Monsieur Claude Allègre, ministre de l'Éducation nationale, Éditions du Cerf, 1998.
- Le mystère du Christ dans les psaumes, Éditions Desclée de Brouwer, 1998.
- La Tradition apostolique; Règle de foi et de vie pour l'Église, Cerf, Paris, 1995.
- Réponse à Eugen Drewermann, Cerf, Paris, 1994.
- Combats pour la Bible en Église; Une brassée de souvenirs, Cerf, Paris, 1994.
- Le Livre de Daniel (CEv 79), Paris, 1992.
- Un Jésus de comédie, augmenté de Un Paul de farce; Lecture critique de trois livres récents, Cerf, Paris, 1991.
- L'origine des Évangiles. Controverse avec J. Carmignac, Cerf, Paris, 1986.
- Qu'est-ce la tradition?, Vie chrétienne, Paris, 1985
- Évangiles et tradition apostolique. Réflexions sur un certain «Christ hébreu», Coll. «Apologique», Éditions du Cerf, 1984.
- La Bible, guide de lecture, Éditions Desclée, 1981.
- Les Poèmes du Serviteur - De la lecture critique à l'herméneutique, coll. Lectio Divina no 103, Cerf, Paris, 1981.
- Péché originel et rédemption à partir de l'Épître aux Romains. Essai théologique. Desclée, Paris, 1973.
- Le Couple humain dans l'Écriture, Cerf, Paris, 1969.
- Pages bibliques, Eugène Belin, Paris, 1954.
- Introduction aux livres saints, Eugène Belin, Paris, 1954.
- The Paschal Feast in the Bible, with J. Pierron
