= Hadramautic language =

Extinct Old South Arabian language

Hadhramautic
- Hadrami
- Native to: Yemen, Oman, Saudi Arabia
- Era: 800 BC – 600 AD
- Language family: Afro-Asiatic: Semitic; West Semitic; South Semitic?; Southwestern?; Sayhadic; Hadhramautic
- Writing system: Ancient South Arabian

Language codes
- ISO 639-3: xhd
- Glottolog: hadr1235
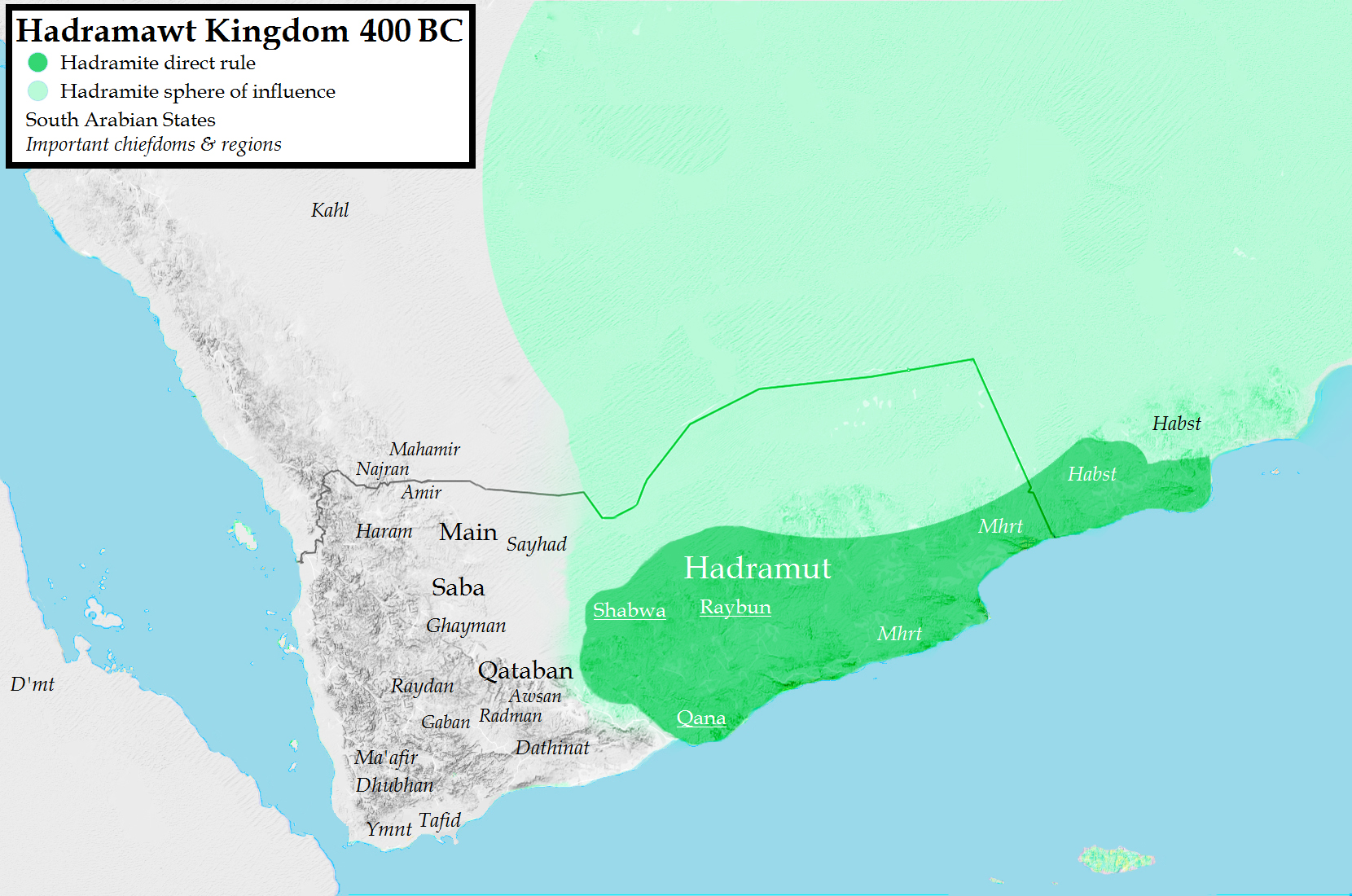
- Kingdom of Hadramawt in 400 BC

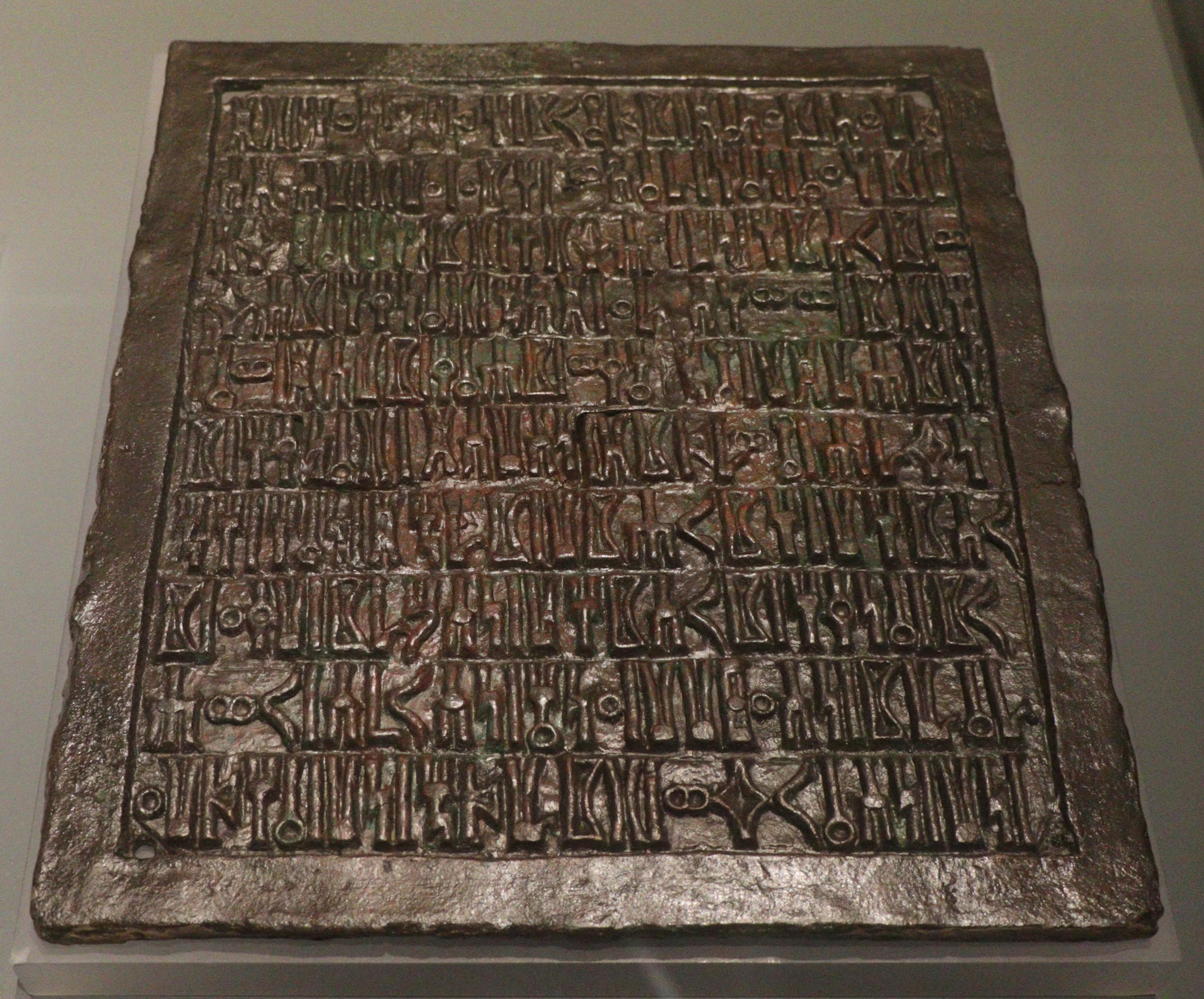
Hadramautic inscription, form Dhofar, National Museum of Oman

Ḥaḍramautic or Ḥaḍramic was the easternmost of the four known languages of the Old South Arabian subgroup of the Semitic languages. It was used in the Kingdom of Hadhramaut and also the area round the Hadhramite capital of Shabwa, in what is now Yemen. The Hadramites also controlled the trade in frankincense through their important trading post of Sumhuram (Hadramautic s_{1}mhrm), now Khor Rori in the Dhofar Governorate, Oman.

== Script and phonology ==
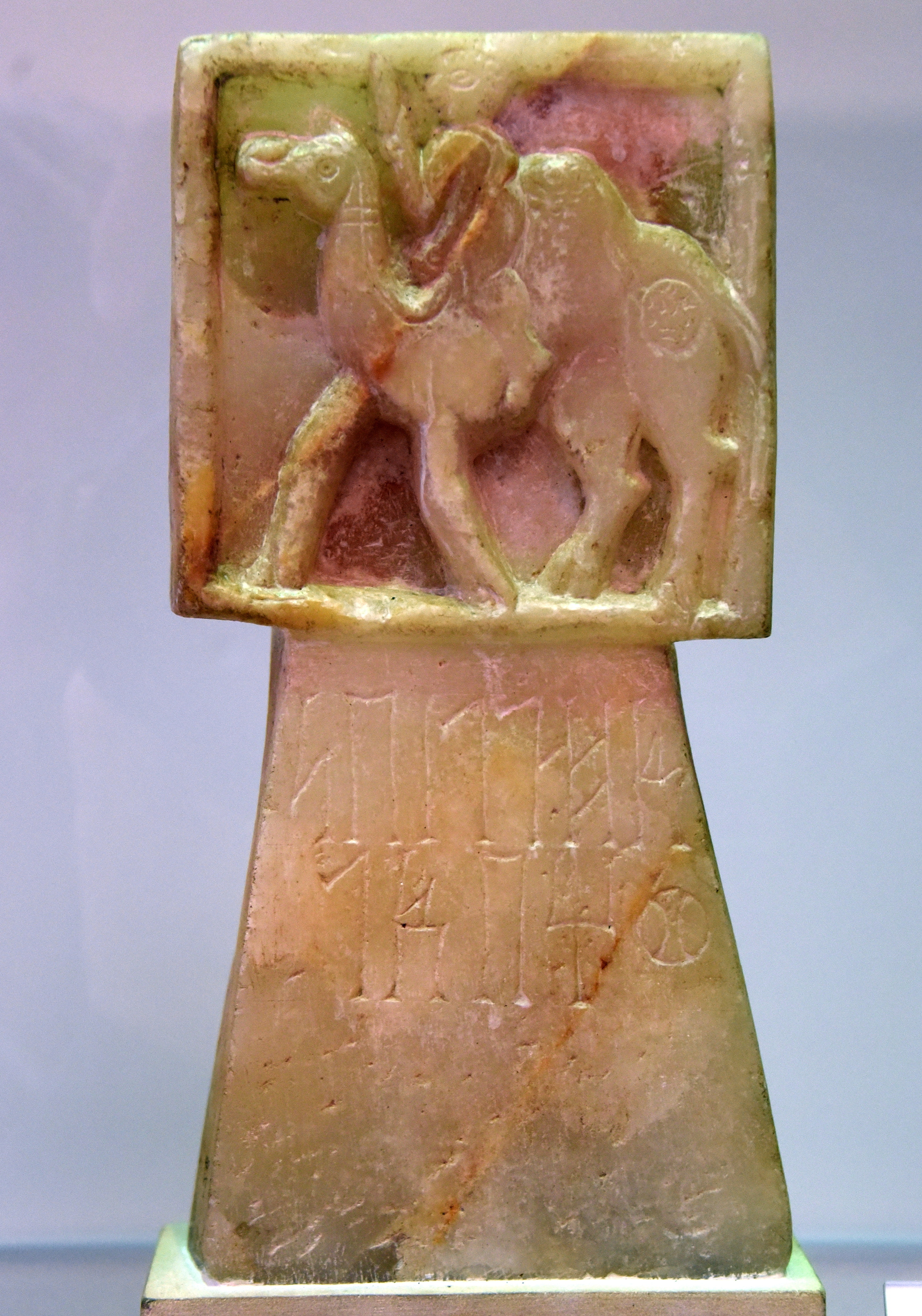
Incense burner, from Shabwah, Hadhramaut, c. 3rd century CE. Nude male riding a camel. Hadramitic inscription, 2 lines. British Museum

Almost the entire body of evidence for the ancient Ḥaḍramautic language comes from inscriptions written in the monumental Ancient South Arabian script, consisting of 29 letters, and deriving from the Proto-Sinaitic script. The sounds of the language were essentially the same as those of Sabaic.

Noteworthy characteristics of Ḥaḍramautic include its tendency, especially in inscriptions from Wadi Ḥaḍhramaut, to represent Old South Arabian ṯ as s_{3}: thus we find s_{2}ls_{3} ("three"; cf. Sabaean s_{2}lṯ.) There are also instances where ṯ is written for an older form s_{3}; e.g. Ḥaḍramautic mṯnad ("inscription"), which is msnd in the rest of Old South Arabian.

== History ==
Potsherds with Ancient South Arabian letters on them, found in Raybūn, the old Ḥaḍramitic capital, have been radiocarbon dated to the 12th century BC. The language was certainly in use from 800 BC but in the fourth century AD, the Kingdom of Hadhramaut was conquered by the Ḥimyarites, who used Sabaic as an official language, and after then there are no more records in Ḥaḍramautic.

During the course of the language's history there appeared particular phonetic changes, such as the change from ˤ to ˀ, from ẓ to ṣ, from ṯ to s_{3}. As in other Semitic languages n can be assimilated to a following consonant, compare ʾnfs_{1} "souls" > ʾfs_{1}

In Ḥaḍramautic the third person pronouns begin with s_{1}. It has feminine forms ending in ṯ and s_{3}.
