= Kileken =

Kileken (sometimes Kileghen) is the subject of a myth of the Maasai people concerning the planet Venus.

In the myth, the planet Venus is called Kileken and visits the Earth in the form of a small boy. The boy befriends an old farmer and tends his cattle, the man agreeing not to pry into the boy's only secret: his origin. When the man betrays his trust and spies on Kileken, the boy vanishes in a bright light and returns to the heavens. The myth explains why the planet Venus is seen during the morning and evening. The oral tradition was captured in the book The Orphan Boy by the Tanzania-born author Tololwa M. Mollel.

In common with other societies, the Maasai believed Venus to be two separate bodies when seen in the morning and evening. Kileken was the appearance of the "morning star" (p512-513 A Treasury of African Folklore). When it could be seen that the men had not yet returned from the hunt, the women would pray for their safekeeping. The "evening star" was known as Leken, and its appearance heralded the rising of the moon.

== References and further reading ==
- Courlander, Harold (1996). A Treasury of African Folklore. Da Capo Press. ISBN 1-56924-816-8.
- Mollel, Tololwa (1990). The Orphan Boy. Oxford University Press. ISBN 0-19-540783-0.
