= Maher (god) =

God of the Axsumites and the Himyarites

Maher or Maḥrem was a South Semitic god of the Aksumites and the Himyarites. He was the son of the main god Ashtar, and his counterpart was Beher, god of the sea. He was the deity of war, comparable to Mars or Ares in ancient Greek mythology, who used both forms of the interpretatio. The god Maher (or Mahrem) held a place of special importance with the Axumites; the kings of the pagan period were all called the "Sons of the Invincible Mahrem."

== See also ==
- Ashtar
- Beher
