= The Oxford Encyclopedia of Archaeology in the Near East =

Encyclopedia

- Editor: Eric M. Meyers
- Published: 1997
- Publisher: Oxford University Press

The Oxford Encyclopedia of Archaeology in the Near East is an encyclopedia of the archaeology of the Near East edited by Eric M. Meyers and published by Oxford University Press. It was welcomed by Douglas R. Givens as "one of the most important compendiums of information comprising the history of Near Eastern Archaeology in recent time". and by Walter E. Aufrecht as "the epitome of what Near East architecture has been and what it is now". Robert D. Biggs also welcomed the encyclopedia but regretted the number of typographical errors in the text.
