= Shabwa =

City in Yemen

Shabwa شَبْوَة 𐩦𐩨𐩥𐩩
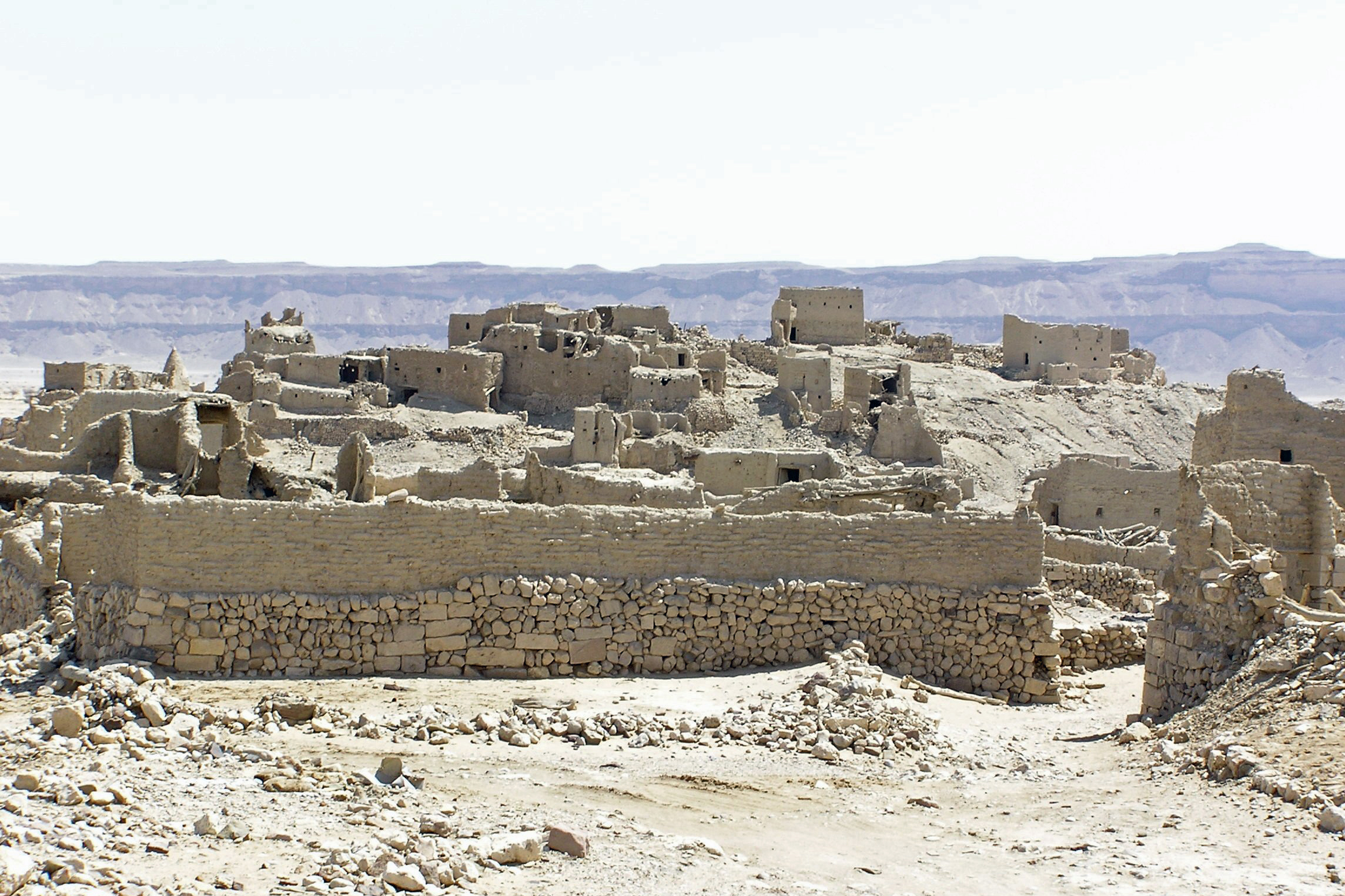
- Interactive map of Shabwa
- Coordinates: 15°22′08″N 47°017′25″E

The ancient city of Shabwa (Hadrami: 𐩦𐩨𐩥𐩩, romanized: šbwt, lit. 'Šabwat'; Arabic: شَبْوَة, romanized: Šabwa) was the capital of the Kingdom of Hadhramaut at the South Arabian region of the Arabian Peninsula. The ruins of the city are located in the north of modern Shabwah Governorate of the Republic of Yemen. Pliny the Elder and Strabo refer to the city as Sabota, formerly a royal city with multiple local temples.

Shabwa in modern Yemen

== History ==
Shabwa was first settled in 13th century BC, and was destroyed by the Himyarites at the end of the 3rd century AD.

== Ruins ==
Archaeological map of French excavations in Shabwa

Within the walls of the city are the remains of:

- the royal palace named Shugair
- the temple of goddess Sian Dhu Aleen

== See also ==
- Middle East

=== Yemen ===
- Shabwa Museum
- Ma'rib
- Shibam
