= Hadhramaut =

Region in southern Arabia

Hadhramaut حضرموت (Arabic)
- Historical region of Arabia
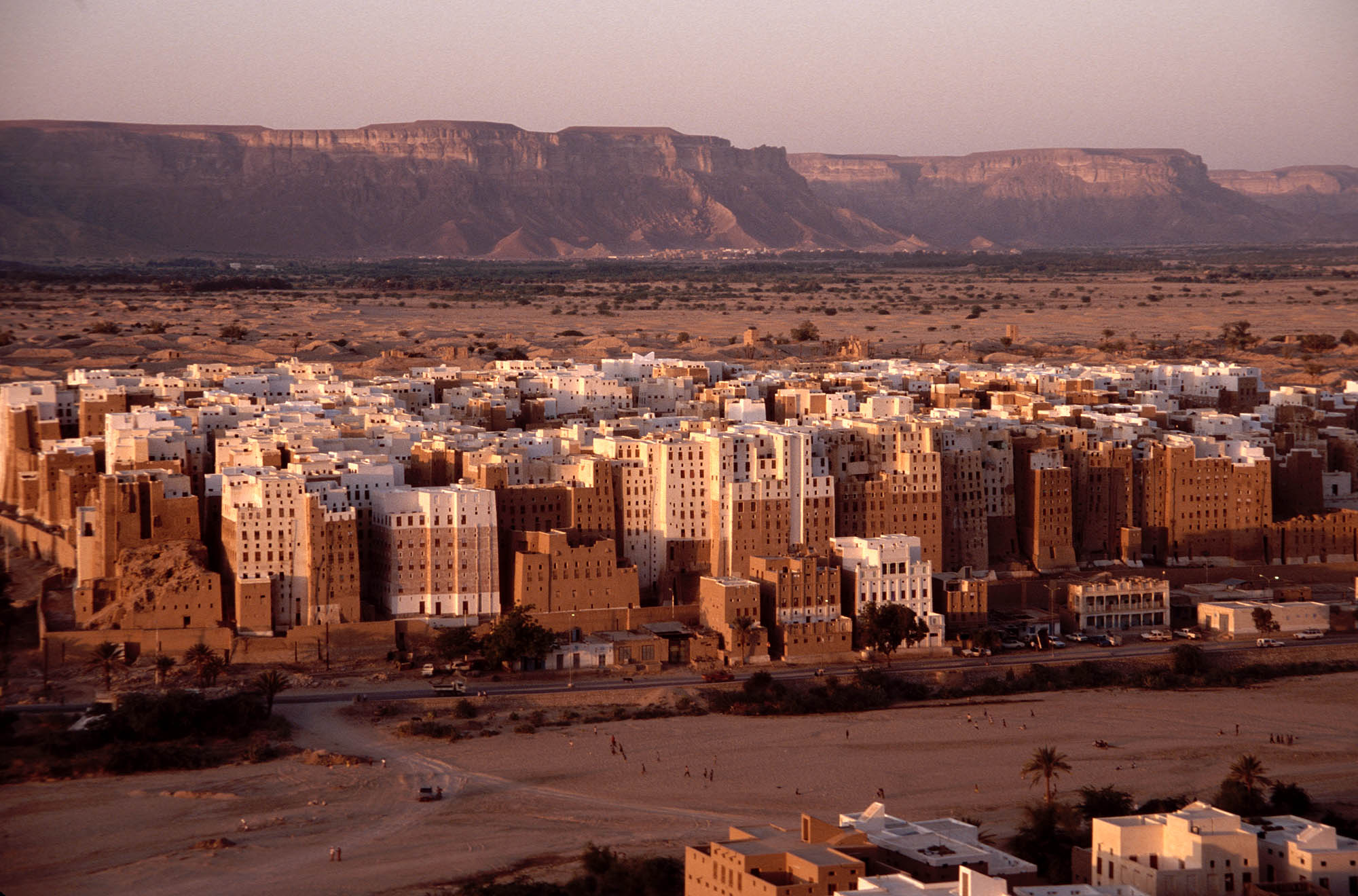
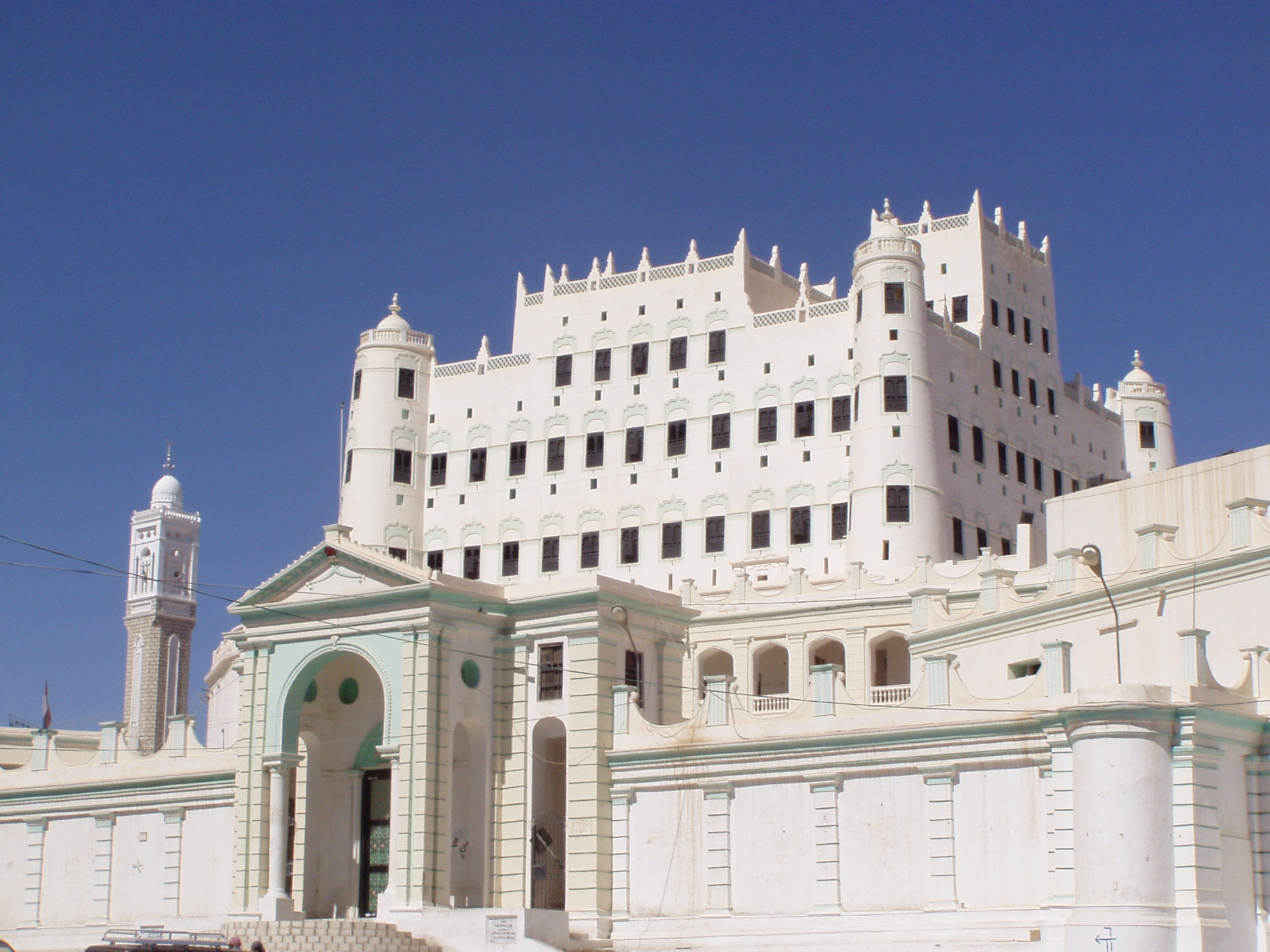
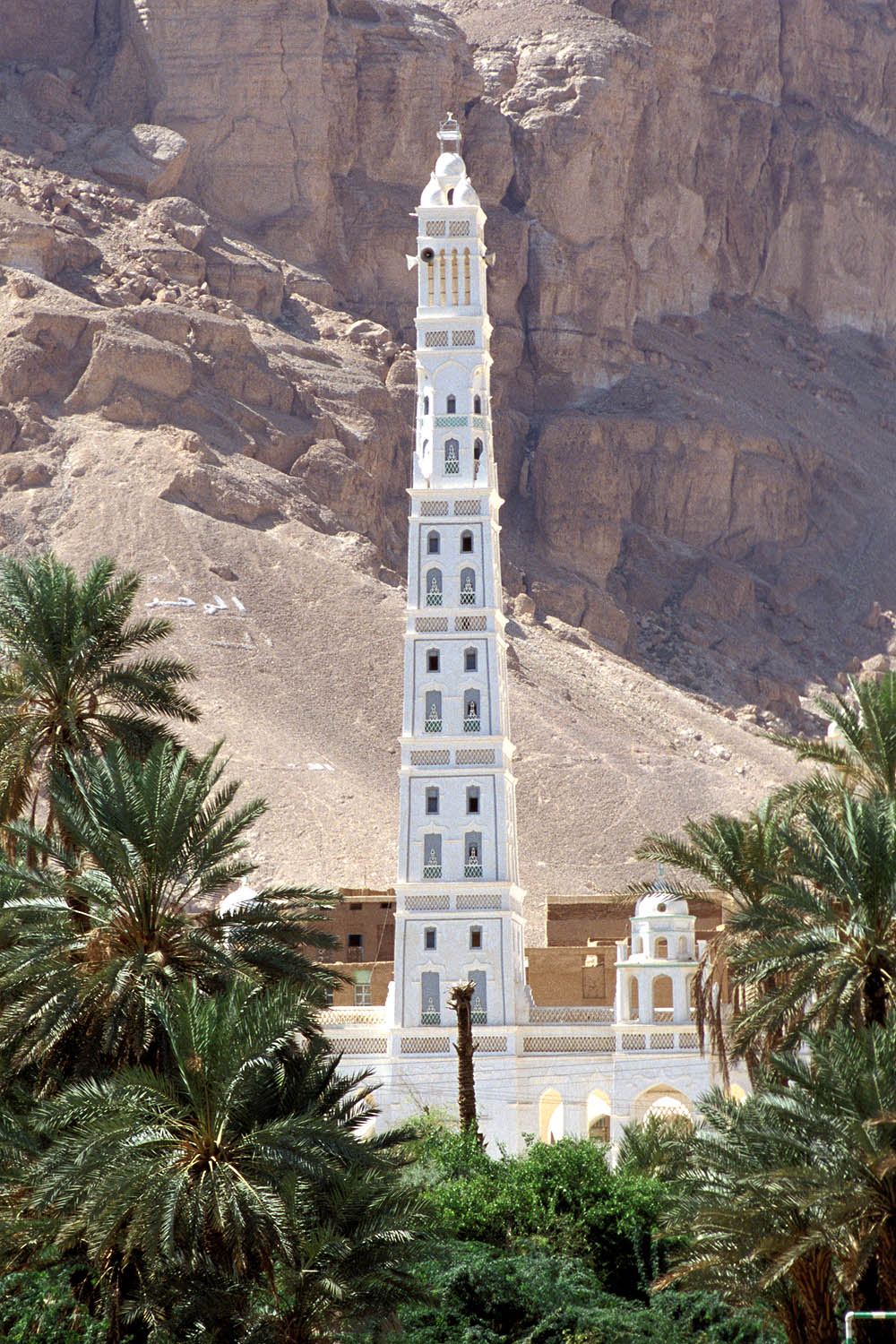
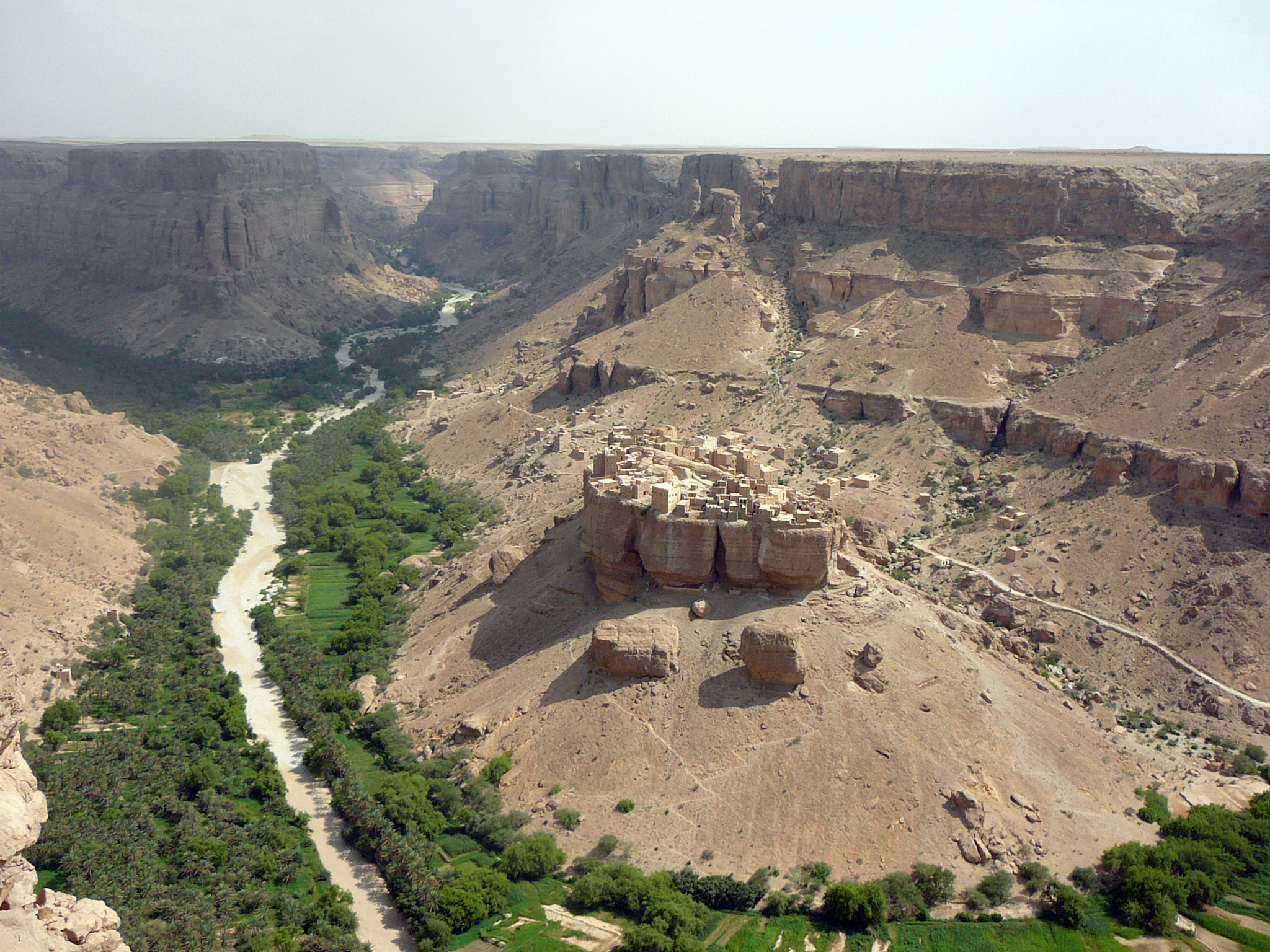
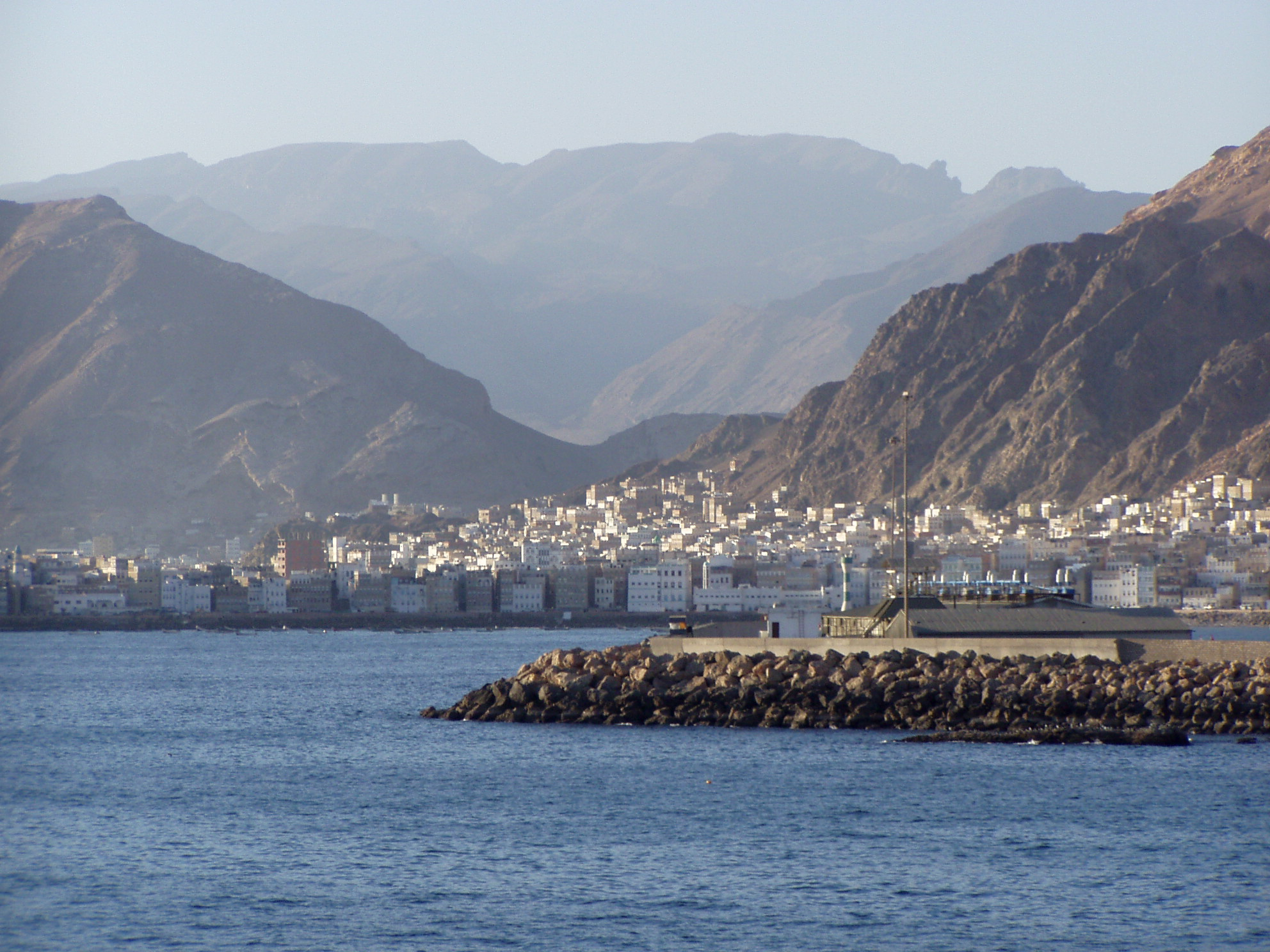
- The Old Walled City of Shibam, a UNESCO World Heritage Site Seiyun Palace, one of the world's largest mud-brick structures The Minaret of al-Muhdhar Mosque Haid al-Jazil in Wadi Dawan Mukalla, capital city of Hadhramaut

- Map of Hadhramaut in the Arabian Peninsula
- Coordinates: 16°N 49°E
- Countries: Yemen (main); Oman; Saudi Arabia
- Notable cities: List: Mukalla; Tarim; Shibam; Seiyun; Ash Shihr; Al Ghaydah; Salalah; Al-Wadiah; Sayhut
- Governorates: List: Hadhramaut (main); Shabwah (main); al Mahra (main); Aden; Abyan; Lahij; Dhofar; Sharurah
- Highest elevation (Kawr Saybān): 2,070 m (6,790 ft)
- Demonym: Hadharem

Hadhramaut (Note: Also romanized as Hadramaut, Hadramout or Hadramawt, pronounced /ˌhɑːdrəˈmɔːt/ HAH-drə-MAWT.) (Arabic: حَضْرَمَوْت, romanized: Ḥaḍramawt; Hadrami Arabic: حَضْرَمُوت, romanized: Ḥaḍramūt) is a geographic region in the southern part of the Arabian Peninsula which includes the Yemeni governorates of Hadhramaut, Shabwah and Mahrah, Dhofar in southwestern Oman, and Sharurah in the Najran Province of Saudi Arabia, and sometimes the Aden, Abyan and Lahij governorates of Yemen at a more stretched historical definition. The region's people are known as the Hadharem. They formerly spoke Hadramautic, an old South Arabian language, but they now predominantly speak the Hadhrami dialect of Arabic.

Though the origins of the name are unknown, the name Hadhramaut is traditionally explained as a compound word meaning "death has come" or "court of death," derived either from the Arabic ḥaḍara ("he came") plus mawt ("death"), a folk nickname for Amer bin Qahtan, the region's legendary first settler, or from the Biblical Hebrew ḥaṣar ("court" or "dwelling") plus māweṯ ("death") as seen in Hazarmaveth. The name is of ancient origin and is reflected in the name of the modern-day Yemeni governorate of Hadhramaut.

The boundaries of Hadhramaut stretch from the Empty Quarter desert in the north down through its Wadi Hadhramaut and coastal plain on the Arabian Sea. Historically it spanned from modern-day Aden in the west across Dhofar to the east but today spans Yemen's Shabwah from the west and Oman's Dhofar to the east. The region once comprised the Qu'aiti and Kathiri sultanates whose lands now form the Hadhramaut governorate, with tribal Hadhrami towns clustered around oasis wells in the wadis, where they farm wheat, millet, dates, coconuts and coffee, while Bedouin herders graze flocks on the plateau. Physically, the region divides into Inner Hadhramaut, centered on the main wadi and its tributaries, and Coastal Hadhramaut, a narrow plain backed by the steep Jowl escarpment; to the north the highland plateau (Haḍbat Ḥaḍramawt) slopes down sharply into the Empty Quarter, creating a transition from lush valley to arid desert.

== Toponymy ==
The origins of the name Ḥaḍramawt are disputed, and numerous debated hypotheses regarding its meaning exist. The most popular folk etymology is that the word comes from a nickname of Amer bin Qahtan, who is thought to be the first person to dwell in the region, meaning "death has come", from the words in Arabic: حَضَر, romanized: ḥaḍara, lit. 'he came' and Arabic: مَوْت, romanized: mawt, lit. 'death'. Another theory is that it is a variant of the name of Islamic prophet Hud (Note: identified as Eber in Biblical tradition) who was sent to this region or his last words "Ludara al-mawt," meaning "death has come."

The name Ḥaḍramawt has also been found within Biblical Hazarmaveth. The name means "court of death" and is composed of two parts: Hebrew: חֲצַרְ, romanized: ḥaṣar, lit. 'dwelling; court' and Hebrew: מָוֶת māweṯ "death". There, Hud was the descendant of ʿĀd, son of Joktan, (Note: identified as Qahtan in Islamic tradition) the purported ancestor and progenitor of the South Arabian kingdoms. According to tradition, the family of ʿĀd was the first to settle in the region, and when the sons of ʿĀd had died, Amer bin Qahtan, nicknamed "Hadhramaut", came to power.

Though the origins of the name are unknown, there are several scholarly proposals. Kamal Salibi says that the diphthong "-aw" is an incorrect vocalisation, noting that "-ūt" is a frequent ending for place names in the Ḥaḍramawt; given that "Ḥaḍramūt" is the colloquial pronunciation of the name, and also its ancient pronunciation, the correct reading of the name would thus be "place of ḥḍrm". Salibi proposes, then, that the name means "the green place", which is appropriate given its well-irrigated wadis, giving a lushness that contrasts with the surrounding high desert plateau.

Variations of the name are attested to as early as the middle of the 1st millennium BC. The names ḥḍrmt (𐩢𐩳𐩧𐩣𐩩) and ḥḍrmwt (𐩢𐩳𐩧𐩣𐩥𐩩) are found in texts of the Old South Arabian languages (Ḥaḍramitic, Minaic, Qatabanic and Sabaic), though the second form is not found in any known Ḥaḍramitic inscriptions. In either form, the word itself can be a toponym, a tribal name, or the name of the kingdom of Ḥaḍramawt. In the late fourth or early 3rd century BC, Theophrastus gives the name Άδρραμύτα, a direct transcription of the Semitic name into Greek.

== History ==
=== Prehistory ===
The earliest human activities in the region date from the Middle Palaeolithic, with the local population using a Levallois technique for flake preparation until the appearance of tools produced by a desert-dwelling pre-agricultural population. From this latter period, or perhaps the succeeding one, can be dated several megalithic structures, large stone circles, and four dolmen-like structures whose inner surfaces were decorated with repetitive rows of pecked meander or crenellated design.

Wadi Hadhramaut and its tributaries have been inhabited since the Stone Age. Small mounds of flint chippings – debris from the manufacture of stone tools and weapons – and windblown dust can be found close to canyon walls. Further north and east are lines of Thamudic ‘triliths’ with a few surviving crude inscriptions. On the fringes of the Rub' al Khali north of Mahra, a seemingly ancient track leads – according to local legend – to the lost city of Ubar.

=== Ancient ===
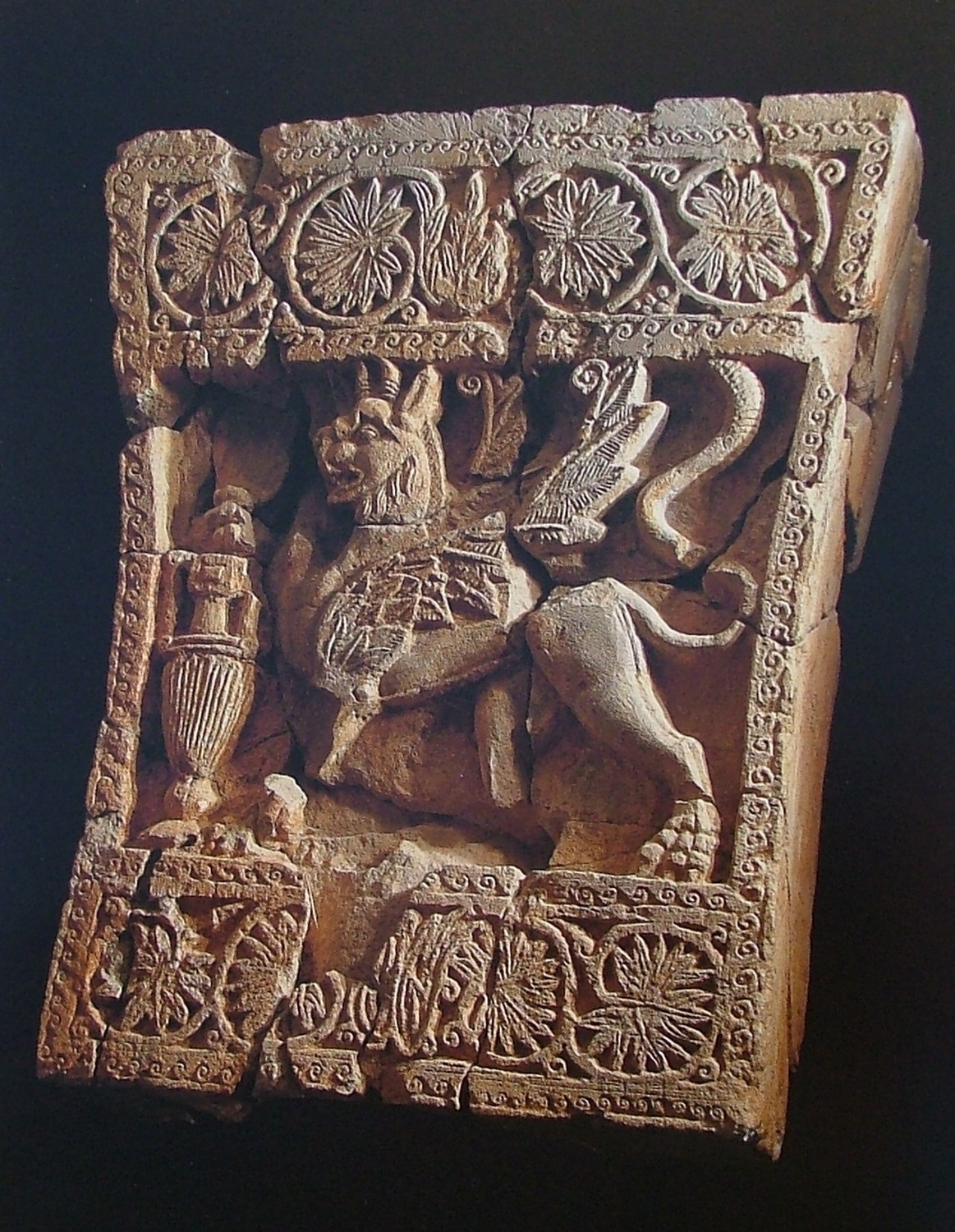
An ancient sculpture of a griffin, from the royal palace at Shabwa, the then-capital city of Hadhramaut

The Kingdom of Hadhramaut was established in the early 1st millennium BCE. Its capital was Shabwa, not far from the city of Teman (the capital of the Kingdom of Qataban), a tribal federation consisting of several tribes united by their common veneration of the lunar god Sin. Hadhramaut became independent from Sheba in c. 330 BCE. Hadhramaut and its god Sin are mentioned in the inscription of Surwah by the Makrib Sabean writer Karib'il Watar I around 700–680 BCE.

The Kingdom, led by King Shahr-al-Khuraymat, allied with the Minaeans and the Kingdom of Qataban and became independent from the Kingdom of Sheba around 330 BCE, during which the Himyarite dynasty ruled the Kingdom of Sheba. The relationship between the Kingdom of Hadhramaut and the Himyarite Kingdom remained tense, with both sides waging wars against each other for control of the trade routes and territory in the region. Early Islamic authors believed the nomadic Kinda tribe that founded a kingdom in central Arabia were originally from Hadhramaut, although distinct from the settled Hadhrami population.

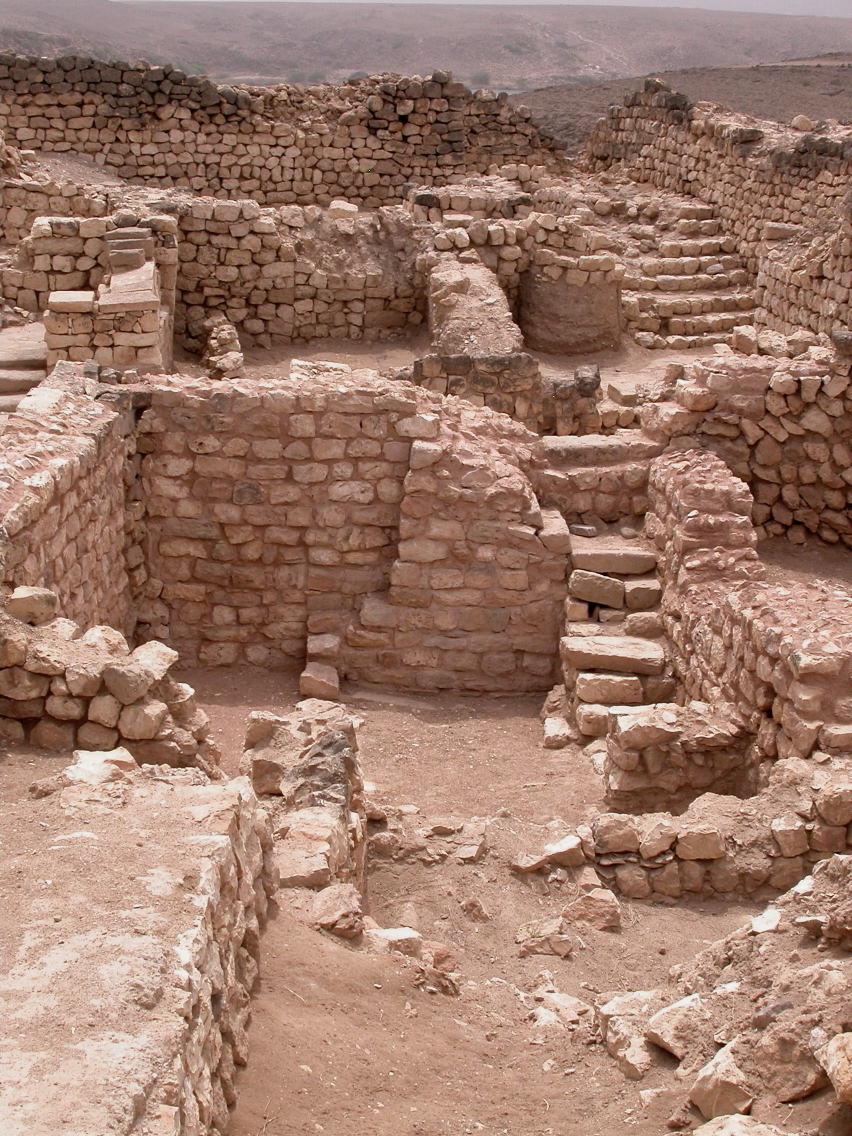
The ruins of Sumhuram in Khor Rori

The Hadhrami are referred to as "Chatramotitai" in ancient Greek texts. Hadhramautic texts come later than Sabaean ones, and some Sabaean texts from Hadhramaut are known. Greek, Latin, Sabaean and Hadhramautic texts preserve the names of many kings of Hadhramaut, but there is as yet no definitive chronology of their reigns. Their capital was Shabwa in the northwest corner of the kingdom, along the Incense trade route. Eratosthenes called it a metropolis. It was an important cult centre as well. At first, the religion was South Arabian polytheism, distinguished by the worship of the Babylonian moon god Sin. By the sixth century, the monotheistic cult of Rahmanan was followed in the local temple.

The political history of Hadhramaut is not easy to piece together. Numerous wars involving Hadhramaut are referenced in Sabaean texts. From their inscriptions, the Hadhrami are known to have fortified Libna (now Qalat) against Himyar and to have fortified mwyt (Ḥiṣn al-Ghurāb حِصْن ٱلْغُرَاب) against the Kingdom of Aksum in the period following the death of Dhū Nuwās. The kingdom ceased to exist by the end of the 3rd century CE, having been annexed by the Himyarite Kingdom. Hadhramaut continued to be used in the full titulature of the kings of Sabaʾ and Dhu Raydān (Himyar).

In the 2nd century CE, Hadhramaut was known for its frankincense and myrrh trade. The incense trade route (southern incense route) that passed through the southern part of Hadhramaut helped the region flourish economically and culturally. The Kingdom of Hadhramaut played a significant role in connecting the cultures of Arabia, Mesopotamia, East Africa, and the Roman Empire.

=== Middle Ages ===
==== Pre-Islamic history ====
Hadhramaut's early economic importance stemmed from its part in the incense trade. Authorities exploited their position on the overland route from Dhufar through Mahra, Hadhramaut and Shabwa to the Hejaz and Eastern Mediterranean to tax caravans in return for protection. Shabwa was Hadhramaut's capital for most of the Himyaritic period. The kingdom of Saba' had its capital at Marib. The Himyaritic civilization flourished from c. 800 BC to 400 CE, when the incense trade was diverted to the newly opened sea route via Aden and the Red Sea. Early in the 6th century, Abyssinians invaded Yemen, encouraged by Byzantines to protect Yemenite Christians from Dhu Nuwas, the anti-Christian ruler of Najran. The Yemenites opposed Ethiopian rule and sought the Sassanid Persians for assistance. The result was that the Persians took over about 570 CE. The Persians appear to have been in Hadhramaut, but the only clear evidence of their presence is at Husn al-Urr, a fort between Tarim and Qabr Hud.

==== Islamic ====
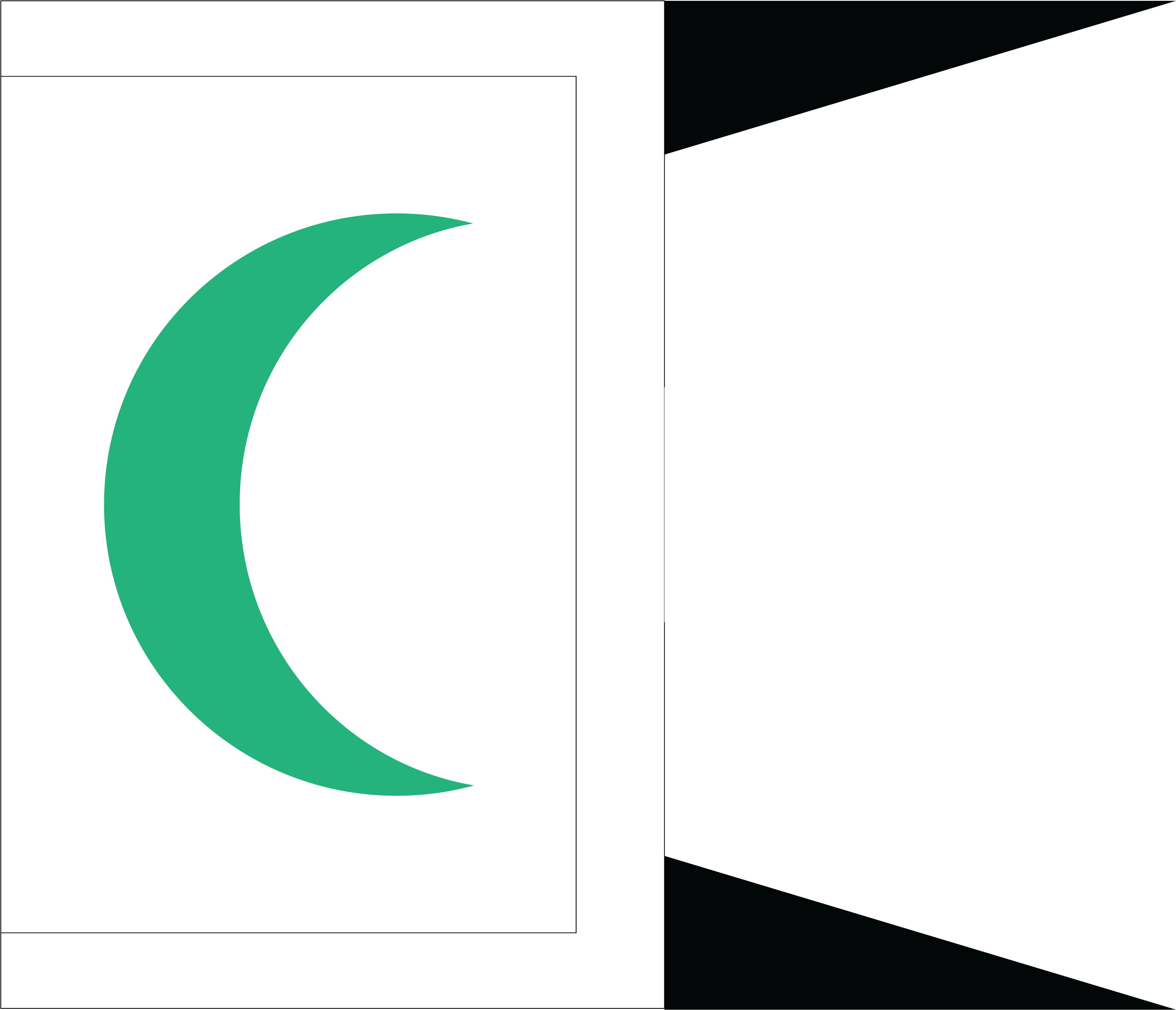
The flag of Hadhramaut in the Battle of Siffin

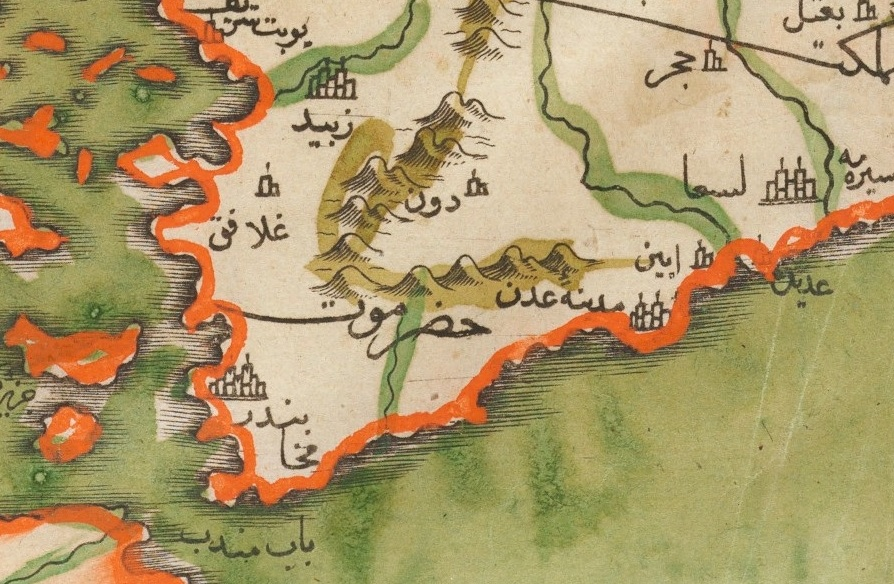
Hadhramaut in a 1732 copy of the map by Ottoman geographer Kâtip Çelebi (1609–57), from the first printed atlas in the Ottoman Empire

Islam reached Hadhramaut in c. 630 after Islamic prophet Muhammad sent Wael bin Hajar as a da'i to the region. The tribes of the region and the ancient aristocracy initially resisted the religion for a considerable period with the city of Tarim being the only adopter of the religion. Nevertheless, companions of Muhammad like Miqdad ibn Aswad and Islamic military leaders like Qaisabah ibn Kalthum were from the region.

As part of the Great Arab Expansion, Hadhramis formed a major part of the Arab armies that conquered North Africa and the Iberian Peninsula. In the mid-8th century, a preacher from Basra called "Abdullah bin Yahya" arrived in Hadhramaut and established the Ibadhi rite of Islam. By the 10th century conflict had erupted between the Hashid and Bakil, the two dominant tribes in the Northern Highlands. Sheikh al-Hadi Yahya bin al-Hussain bin al-Qasim ar-Rassi (a sayyid) was called from Medina to settle this affair at Sa'da in 893–897. He founded the Zaidi Imamate which reigned until Imam Al-Badr was deposed in 1962. In 951 CE, Imam Aḥmad bin `Isā Al-Muhājir arrived from Iraq with a large number of followers, and established the Shafi`i madhab of Sunni Islam (according to majority of historians), which remains dominant in the region. A Ribat, or University, was first established in Zabid, in the Tihama, and, later, in Tarim. The latter still functions.

In the 11th century, the Hadhramaut region came under the rule of the Mahdids, who were of Banu Hadhrami origin. They established the Qasimi dynasty, which ruled the region for several centuries.

==== 15th century ====
In 1488, the Kathiris, led by Badr Abu Towairaq, invaded Hadhramaut from the High Yemen and established their state, first in Tarim and then in Seiyun. The Kathiris employed mercenaries, mainly Yafa'is from the mountains north-east of Aden. About a hundred years after arriving, their momentum was lost. The Yafa'is usurped western Hadhramaut and established a separate state based at Al-Qatn.

==== Portuguese and Ottoman Influence ====
In the 16th century, the Portuguese arrived in Hadhramaut and established several settlements along the southern coast. However, their influence was short-lived as the Yemeni Imams managed to drive them out by the 17th century. Subsequently, Hadhramaut came under Ottoman influence, and the Ottomans maintained control over the region until the early 20th century.

=== Modern ===
==== Sultanates and the British rule ====
Flag of Kathiri

Flag of Qu'aiti

Despite establishing a regionally advanced administration, by the 1930s the Qu'aiti Sultan Saleh bin Ghalib (r. 1936–1956) was facing stiff pressure to modernize – a task for which he seriously lacked resources. These demands were largely initiated by returning Yemeni emigrants, such as the Kaf Sayyids of Tarim. The family of Al-Kaf had made their fortune in Singapore, and wished to spend some of their wealth improving living conditions at home. Led by Sayyid Abu Bakr al-Kaf bin Sheikh, they built a motor road from Tarim to Shihr – hoping to use it to import goods into Hadhramaut, but were frustrated by opposition from the camel-owning tribes who had a transport monopoly between the coast and the interior.

In February 1937, a peace between the Qu'aiti and Kathiri sultanates, totally unprecedented in the history of that region, was brought about essentially by the efforts of two men: Sayyid Abu Bakr al-Kaf and Harold Ingrams, the first political officer in Hadhramaut. Sayyid Abu Bakr used his personal wealth to finance this peace, which was known universally thereafter as "Ingrams Peace." This brought some stability, permitting introduction of administrative, educational and development measures. Tarim remained under Kathiri rule. However, Tarim, alongside the neighboring settlement of Al Ghuraf, was a pocket of Kathiri territory in the country of the Tamim. The Tamim, a subset of the larger Bani Dhanna tribe, occupied the land in between Tarim and Seiyoun and owed political allegiance to the Qu'aiti Sultanate.

The Qu'aiti sultans ruled the vast majority of Hadramaut, under a loose British protectorate, the Aden Protectorate, from 1882 to 1967, when the Hadhramaut was annexed by South Yemen. The Qu'aiti dynasty was founded by Umar bin Awadh al-Qu'aiti, a Yafa'i tribesman whose wealth and influence as hereditary Jemadar of the Nizam of Hyderabad's armed forces enabled him to establish the Qu'aiti dynasty in the latter half of the 19th century, winning British recognition of his paramount status in the region in 1882. The British Government and the traditional and scholarly sultan Ali bin Salah signed a treaty in 1937, appointing the British government as "advisors" in Hadhramaut. The British exiled him to Aden in 1945, but the Protectorate lasted until 1967.

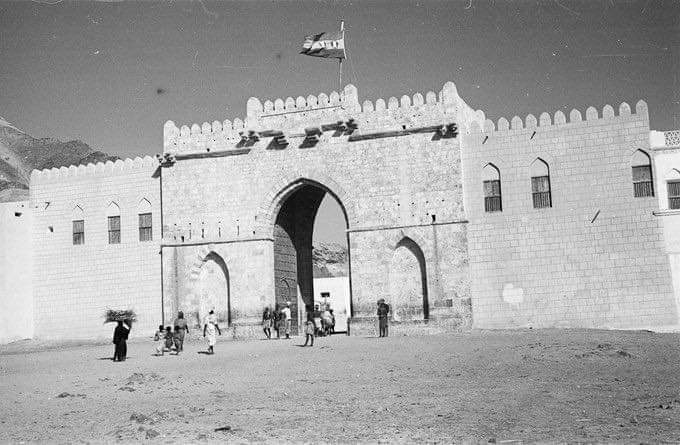
Gate of Mukalla in Qu'aiti, 1949

During the final years of the British colonial rule in South Arabia, Hadhramaut remained administratively distinct from the Federation of South Arabia. The region was primarily governed by the Qu'ayti and Kathiri sultanates. The Hadhrami sultans resisted integration into the Federation, maintaining a separate identity and exploring options for total independence or potential links to Saudi Arabia.

In the 1960s, a rise of revolutionary sentiment in the region was fueled by the spread of Nasserism and anti-colonial ideas throughout the Hadhrami diaspora. The Movement of Arab Nationalists (MAN) established its first Hadhrami cells in 1960. By 1963, MAN leadership helped form the National Liberation Front (NLF) to challenge British rule across the south.

While the NLF engaged in fighting in Aden and its hinterland, its strategy in Hadhramaut relied on the systemic infiltration of local security forces, most notably the Hadhrami Bedouin Legion (HBL), which allowed the NLF to seize control with minimal resistance in late 1967. While the Qu'ayti and Kathiri sultans were attending UN negotiations in Geneva, revolutionary forces took over the administrative centers. When the sultans attempted to return via Mukalla on 17 September 1967, they were blocked by a combined NLF-HBL delegation, effectively ending monarchical rule.

==== Under the People's Democratic Republic of Yemen ====
In 1967, the former states of the British Aden Protectorate became an independent Communist state, the People's Democratic Republic of Yemen (PDRY). Hadhramaut's transition into the PDRY was marked by ideological conflict. Local NLF leaders, including future Vice President Ali Salem al-Beidh and Governor Faysal al-Attas, represented the party's radical left wing. In May 1968, these local figures attempted to assert regional autonomy by declaring the People's Democratic Republic of Hadhramaut. This move was viewed by president Qahtan Muhammad al-Shaabi as a threat to national unity to the government in Aden. In response, he deployed the army to purge the Hadhrami NLF leadership and bring the province under centralized authority.

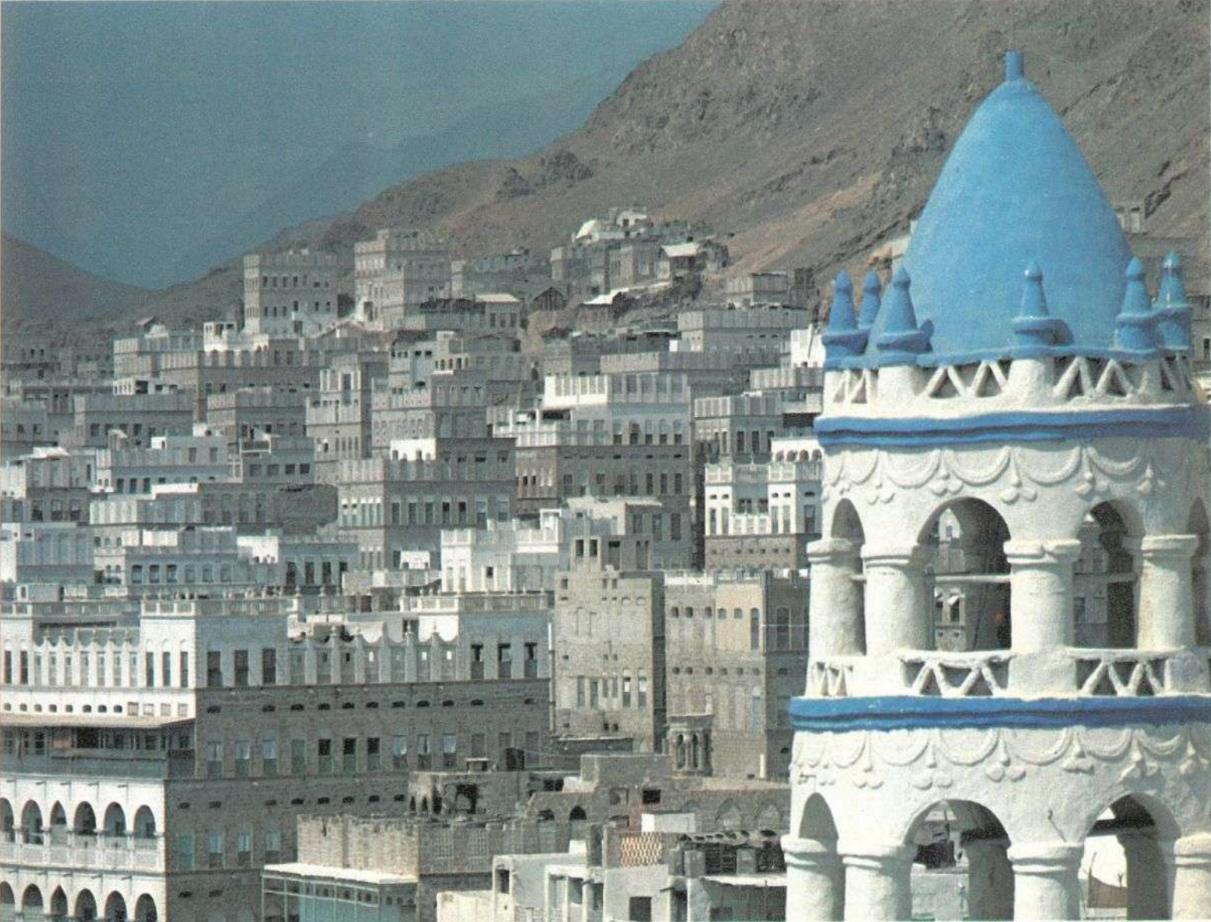
Mukalla in the 1970s

Under the Yemeni Socialist Party (YSP), Hadhramaut was integrated into a unified state that prioritized the eradication of tribal identities. While early revolutionary policies led to friction—including the desecration of Sufi shrines in the late 1960s—the 1980s saw a more conciliatory approach toward the religious establishment. Despite the state's diplomatic isolation from most of the Gulf Cooperation Council due to its alliance with the Soviet Union, the Hadhrami economy remained resilient due to the steady flow of remittances from workers living in the Gulf states.

Hadhramaut was historically underrepresented in the NLF's central hierarchy compared to the more politically dominant regions of Abyan and Lahij. This regional power balance shifted following the South Yemeni crisis, a brief but violent conflict between rival factions in Aden. Although Hadhramaut was not a primary theater of combat, the resulting political vacuum allowed Hadhrami politicians to ascend to the top of the state apparatus. Ali Salem al-Beidh assumed leadership of the YSP, while Haydar Abu Bakr al-Attas became president, leading the country until South Yemen was united with North Yemen in 1990 as the Republic of Yemen.

==== Contemporary Yemen ====
The capital and largest city of Hadhramaut is the port Mukalla. Mukalla had a 1994 population of 122,400 and a 2003 population of 174,700, while the port city of Ash Shihr has grown from 48,600 to 69,400 in the same time. One of the more historically important cities in the region is Tarim. An important locus of Islamic learning, it is estimated to contain the highest concentration of descendants of Muhammad anywhere in the world.

== Geography ==
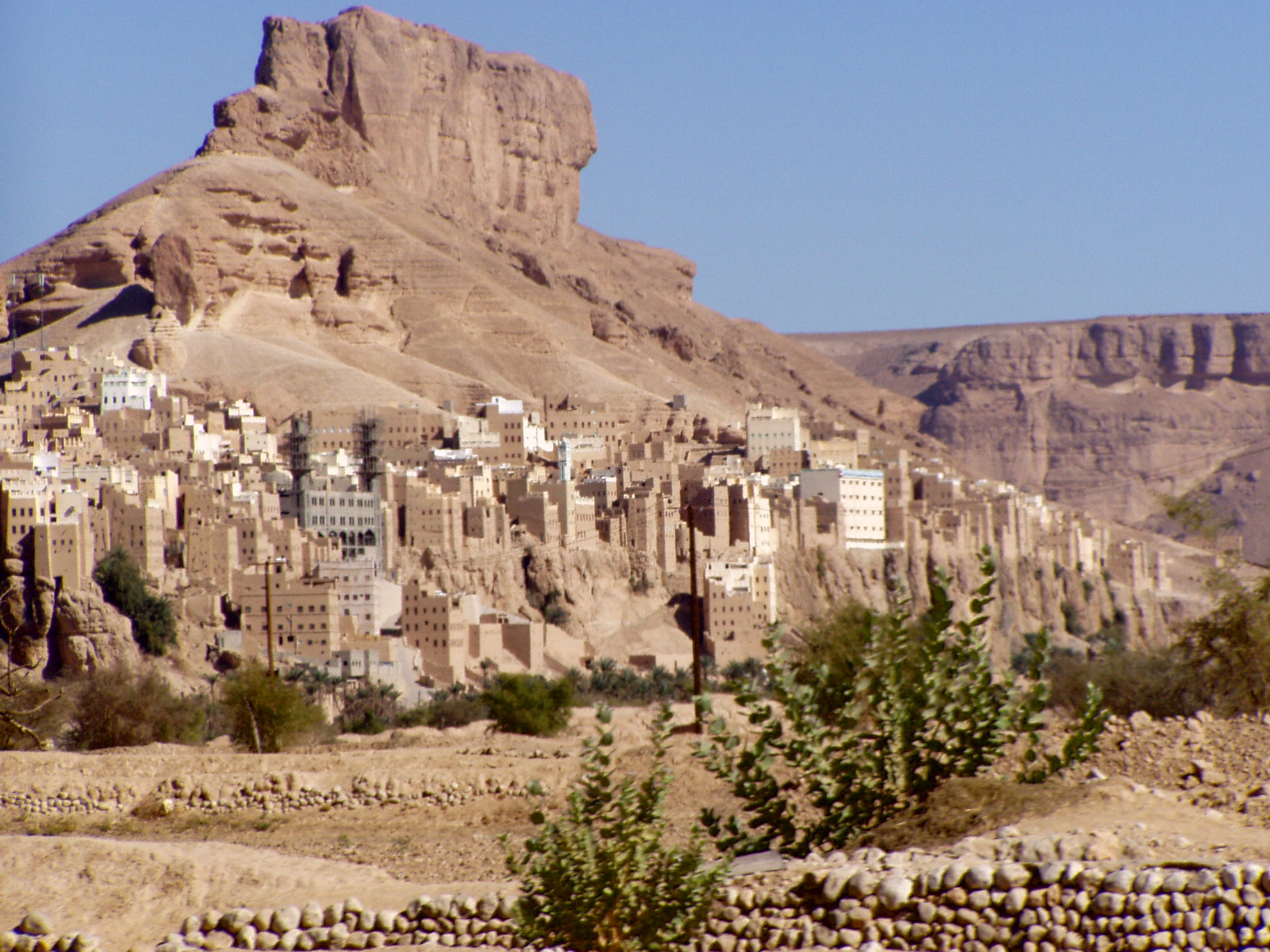
Al-Hajarayn, Wadi Dowan

=== Physical geography ===
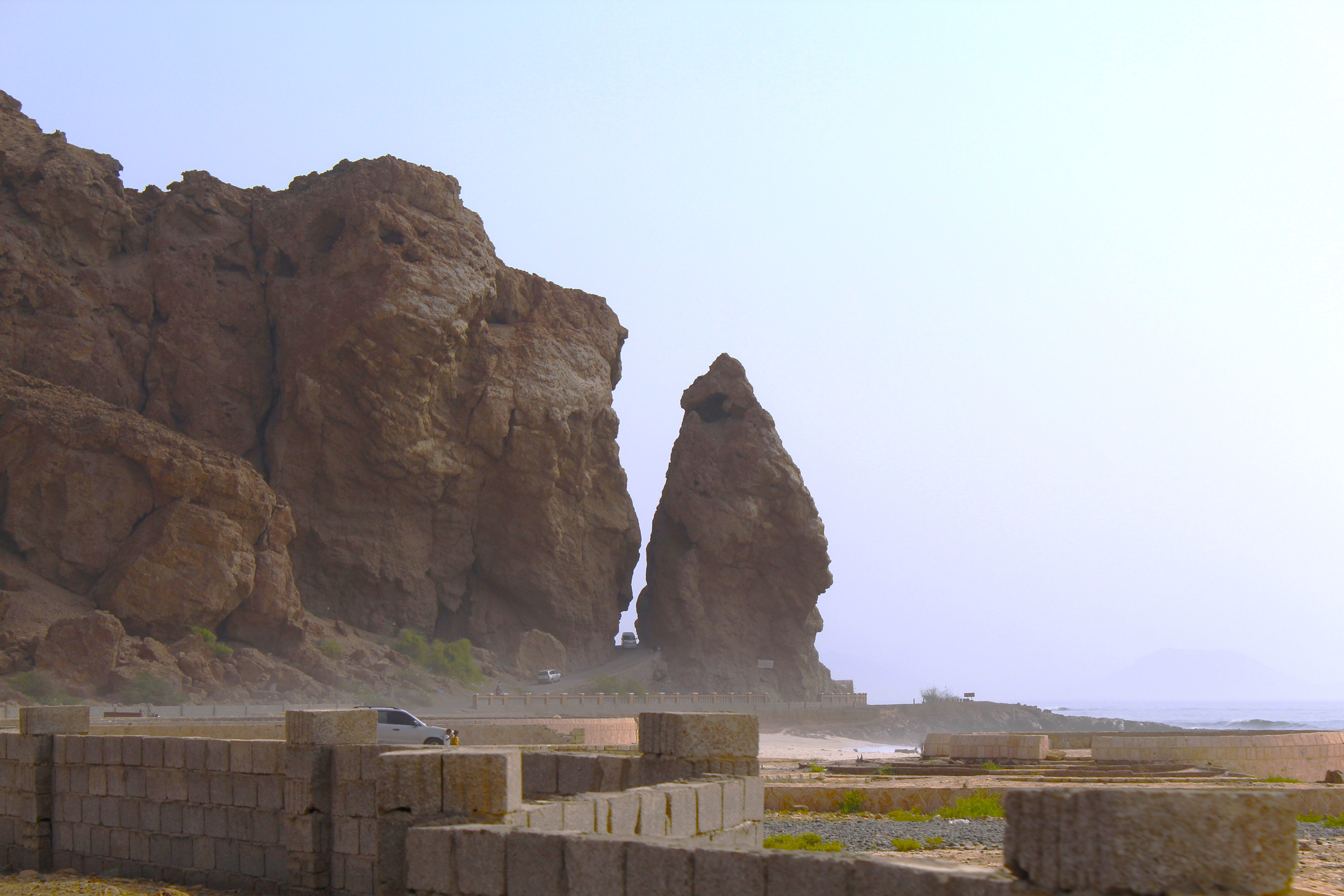
Al-Shaggain in Burum, Brom Mayfa District

Hadhramaut is geographically divided into Inner Hadhramaut (Hadrami Arabic: حضرموت الداخل) which is made up of Wadi Hadhramaut, smaller tributary wadis south from the main wadi, and Coastal Hadhramaut (Hadrami Arabic: حضرموت الساحل) which consists of a narrow, arid coastal plain bounded by the steep escarpment of a broad plateau locally known as the Jowl (Hadrami Arabic: ٱلْجَوْل, romanized: al-Jawl, averaging 1,370 m (4,490 ft)). The undefined northern edge of Hadhramaut slopes down to the desert of the Empty Quarter, where the Hadhramaut Plateau or Highlands (Arabic: هَضْبَة حَضْرَمَوْت, romanized: Haḍbat Ḥaḍramawt) meets the Gulf of Aden in the Arabian Sea, elevation abruptly decreases.

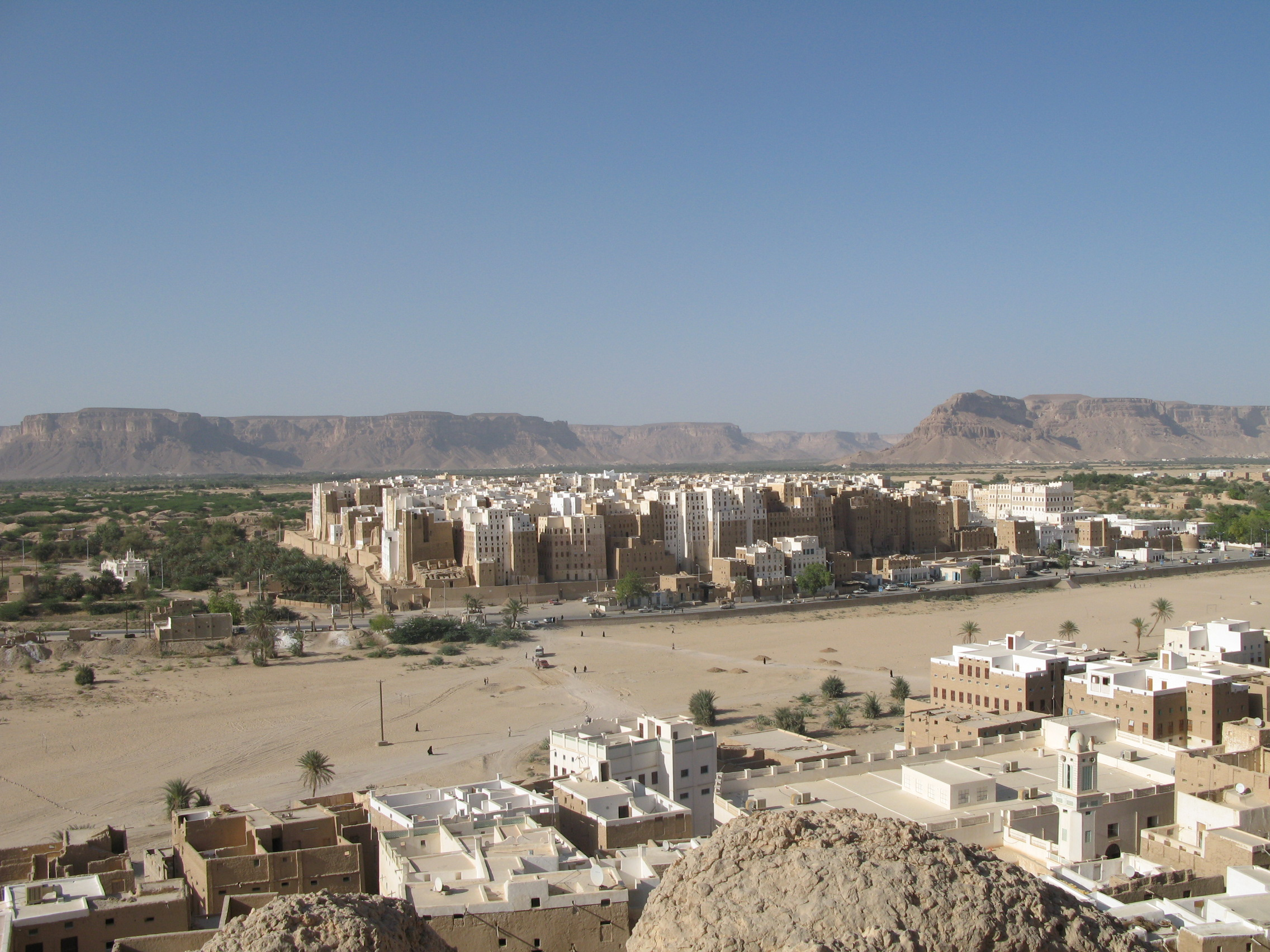
Shibam in Wadi Hadhramaut, with mountains in the background

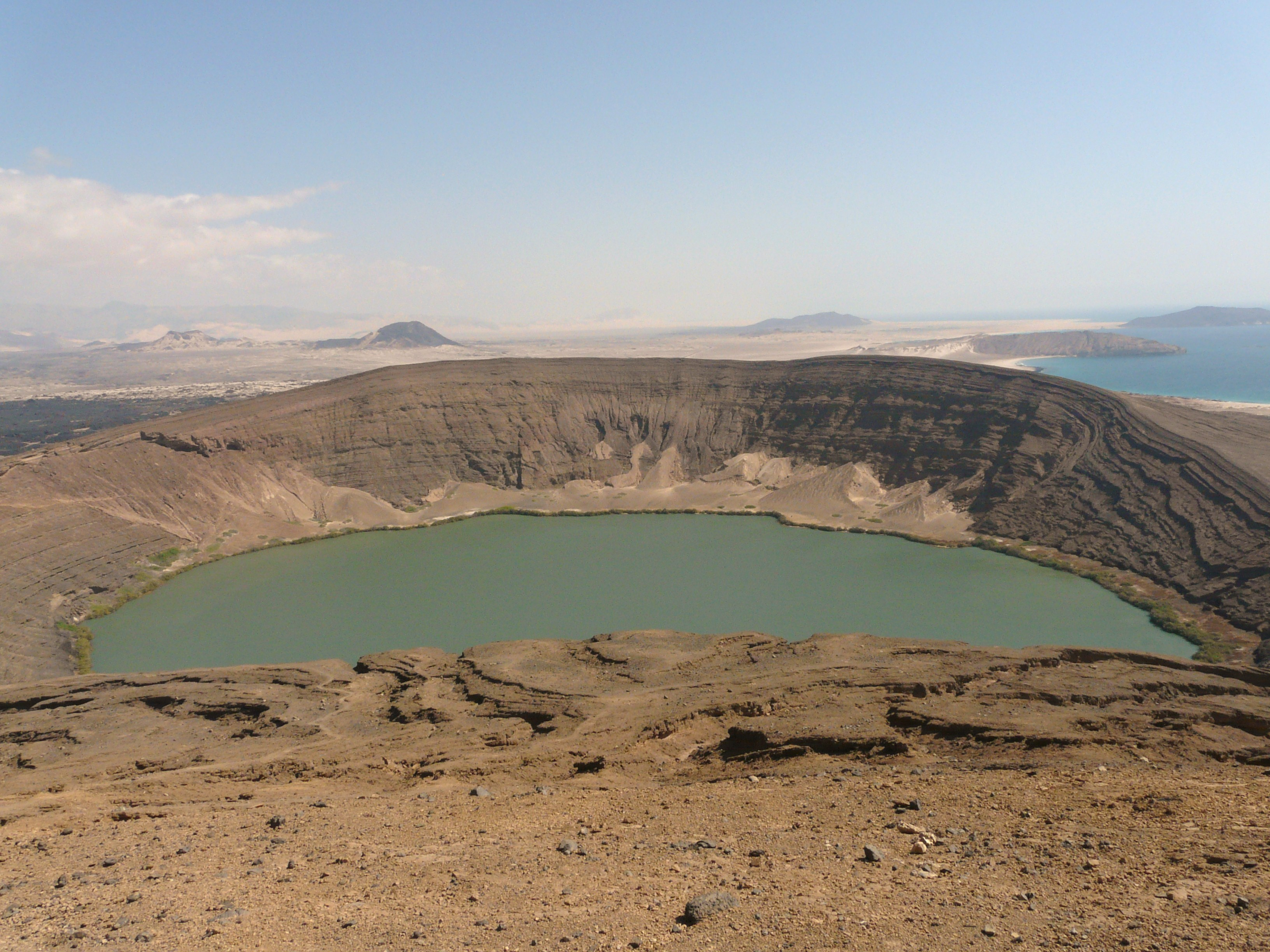
Bir Ali Crater in Shabwa, the crater is about 1.3 km wide and contains water with a surface of about 800 meters wide

==== Mountains ====
The Hadhramaut Mountains (Arabic: جِبَال حَضْرَمَوْت, romanized: Jibāl Ḥaḍramawt), also known as the "Mahrah Mountains" (Arabic: جِبَال ٱلْمَهْرَة, romanized: Jibāl Al-Mahrah), are a mountain range in Yemen. They are contiguous with the Omani Dhofar Mountains to the northeast, and James Canton considered Aden in the southwest to be in the mountains' recesses.

==== Wadis ====
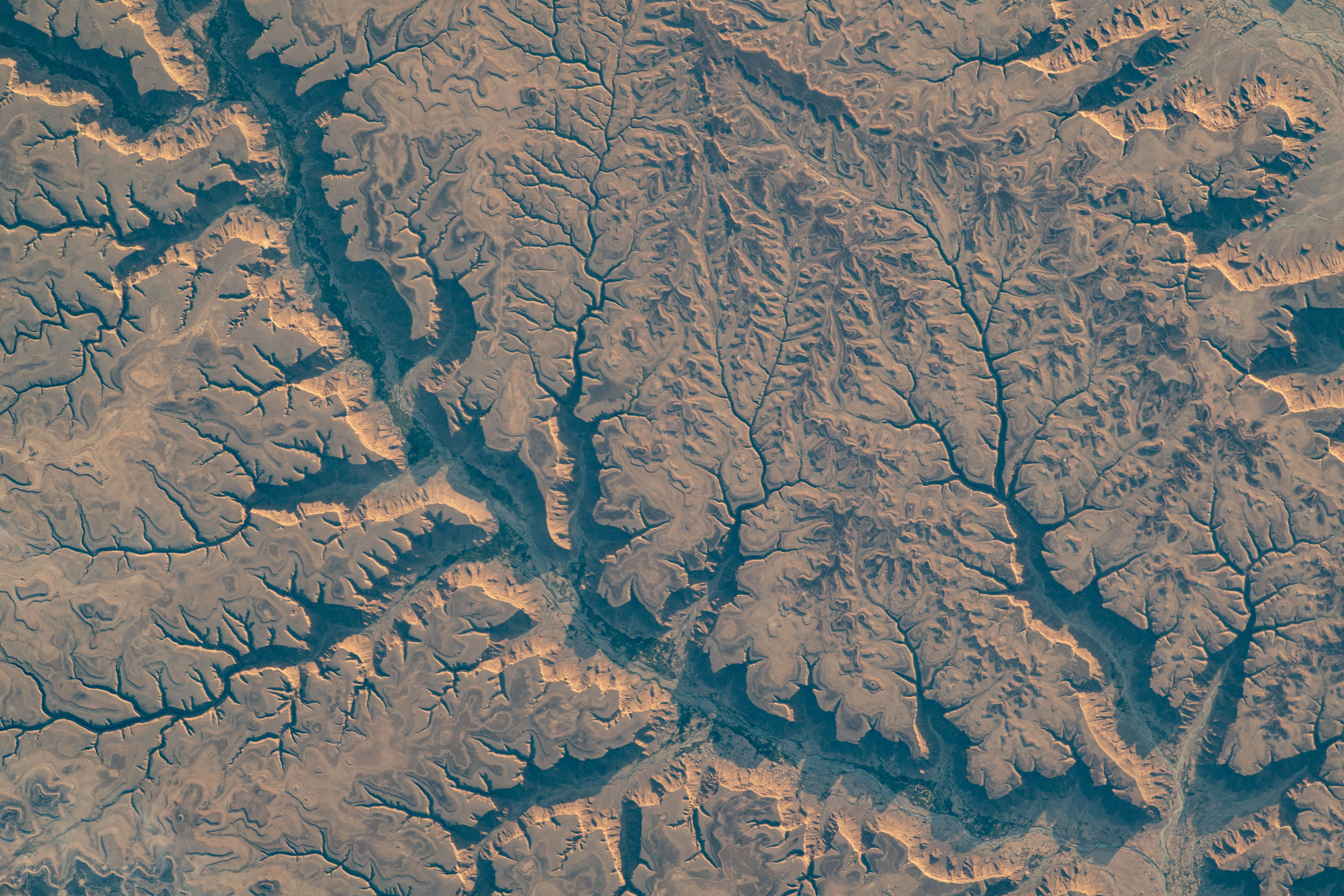
Image of Wadi Hadhramaut, its tributaries and the plateau from the ISS

Wadi Hadhramaut (Arabic: وادي حضرموت) is the main wadi in the region, which has 16 tributary wadis, which are:

Wadis
Southern plateau	Northern plateau
Wadi Dahr	Wadi Hanin
Wadi Rahyah	Wadi Sad
Wadi 'Amd	Wadi Na'am
Wadi Dawan	Wadi Ja'imah
Wadi al'Ain	Wadi Thabi
Wadi Manoob bin Ali	Wadi al-Jon
Wadi 'Adim	
Wadi 'Aynat	
Wadi Tena	
Wadi Sena	

=== Political geography ===
The borders of Hadhramaut have varied over time to include the territory between Aden and Dhofar, but it always included the Wadi Hadhramaut, the lands between the Wadi and the coast, and the desert region of the Empty Quarter north of the Wadi. This encompasses the current governorates of Hadramaut and Mahra in their entirety as well as parts of the Shabwah Governorate. The current governorate of Hadhramaut roughly incorporates the former territory of the two sultanates.

The Hadharem live in densely built towns centered on traditional watering stations along the wadis. Hadharem harvest crops of wheat and millet, tend date palm and coconut groves, and grow some coffee. On the plateau, Bedouins tend sheep and goats. Society is still highly tribal, with the old Seyyid aristocracy, descended from the Islamic prophet Muhammad, traditionally educated, strict in their Islamic observance, and highly respected in religious and secular affairs.

== Economy ==
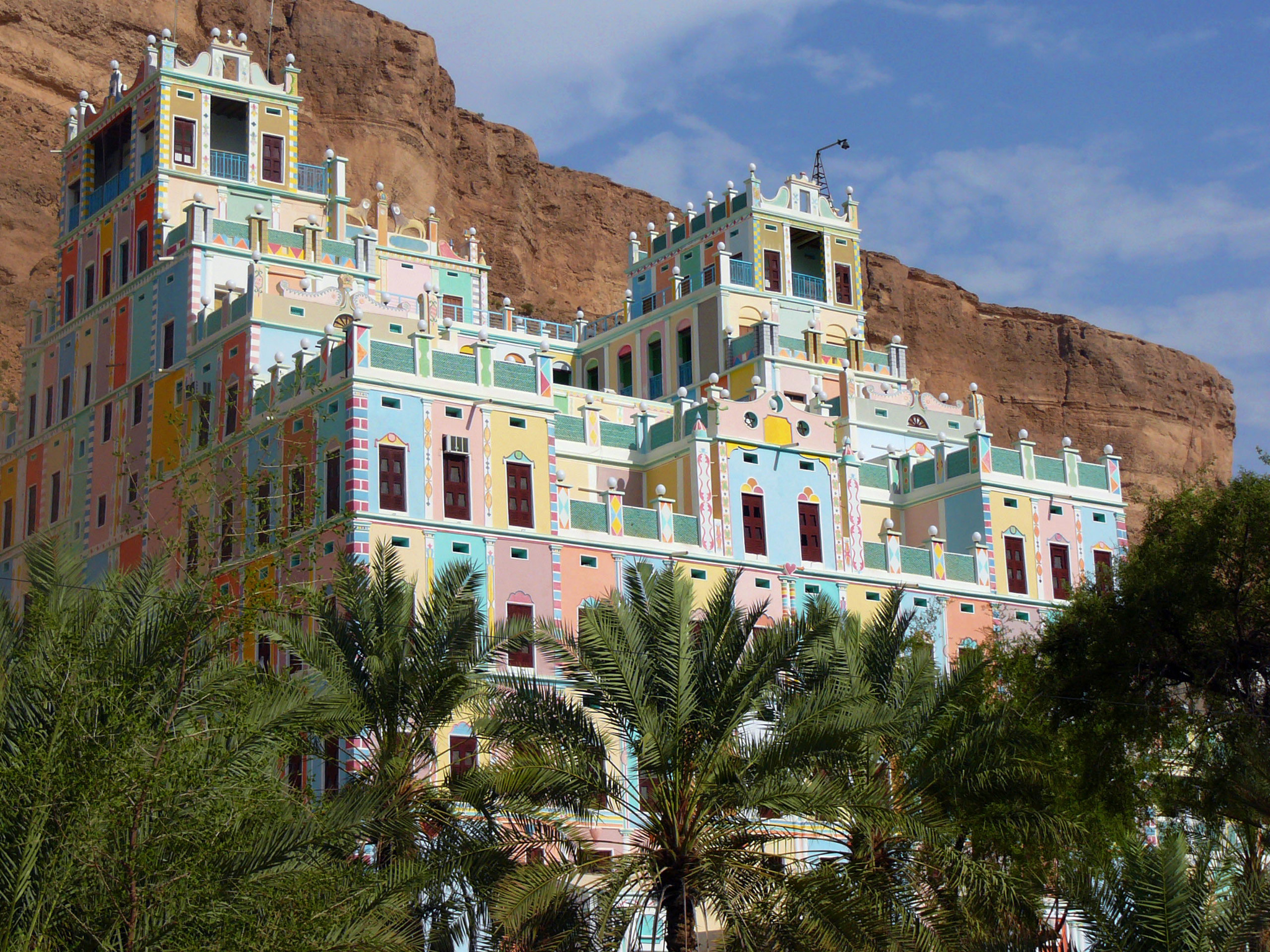
The Bugshan Palace in Wadi Dawan

Historically, Hadhramaut was known for being a major producer of frankincense, which in the early 20th century was mainly exported to Mumbai in India. The region has also produced senna and coconut. Farming and fishing are other economic activities in the region, where 5.8% of Yemen's total agriculture comes from the Hadhramaut Governorate alone. Key agricultural products from this region include dates and various grains. Additionally, the fishing sector serves as a primary economic resource for the local population, benefiting from a lengthy coastline along the Arabian Sea that is rich in diverse fish and marine life.

The governorate's lands also hold mineral resources, notably oil and gold. Currently, Hadhramaut produces approximately 260,000 barrels of oil per day; one of the most productive fields is Al Maseelah in the strip (14), which was discovered in 1993. The Yemeni government is keen to develop its oil fields to increase oil production to increase national wealth in response to the requirements of economic and social development in the country. Oil contributes 30–40% of the nation's GDP, over 70% of total state revenues, and more than 90% of the value of the country's exports.

=== Oil and gas ===
A Soviet discovery in the southern governorate of Shabwah has proven only marginally successful even when taken over by a different group. A Western consortium began exporting oil from Masila in the Hadhramaut in 1993, and production there reached 67,000 m^{3}/d (420,000 bbl/d) in 1999. There are new finds in the Jannah (formerly known as the Joint Oil Exploration Area) and east Shabwah blocks. Yemen's oil exports in 1995 earned about US$1 billion. Yemen's offshore oil and gas deposits are estimated to contain billions of barrels of oil and gas. Marib oil contains associated natural gas. In September 1995, the Yemeni Government signed an agreement that designated TotalEnergies of France to be the lead company for a project for the export of liquefied natural gas (LNG). In 1997, Yemen Gas Company joined with various privately held companies to establish Yemen LNG (YLNG).

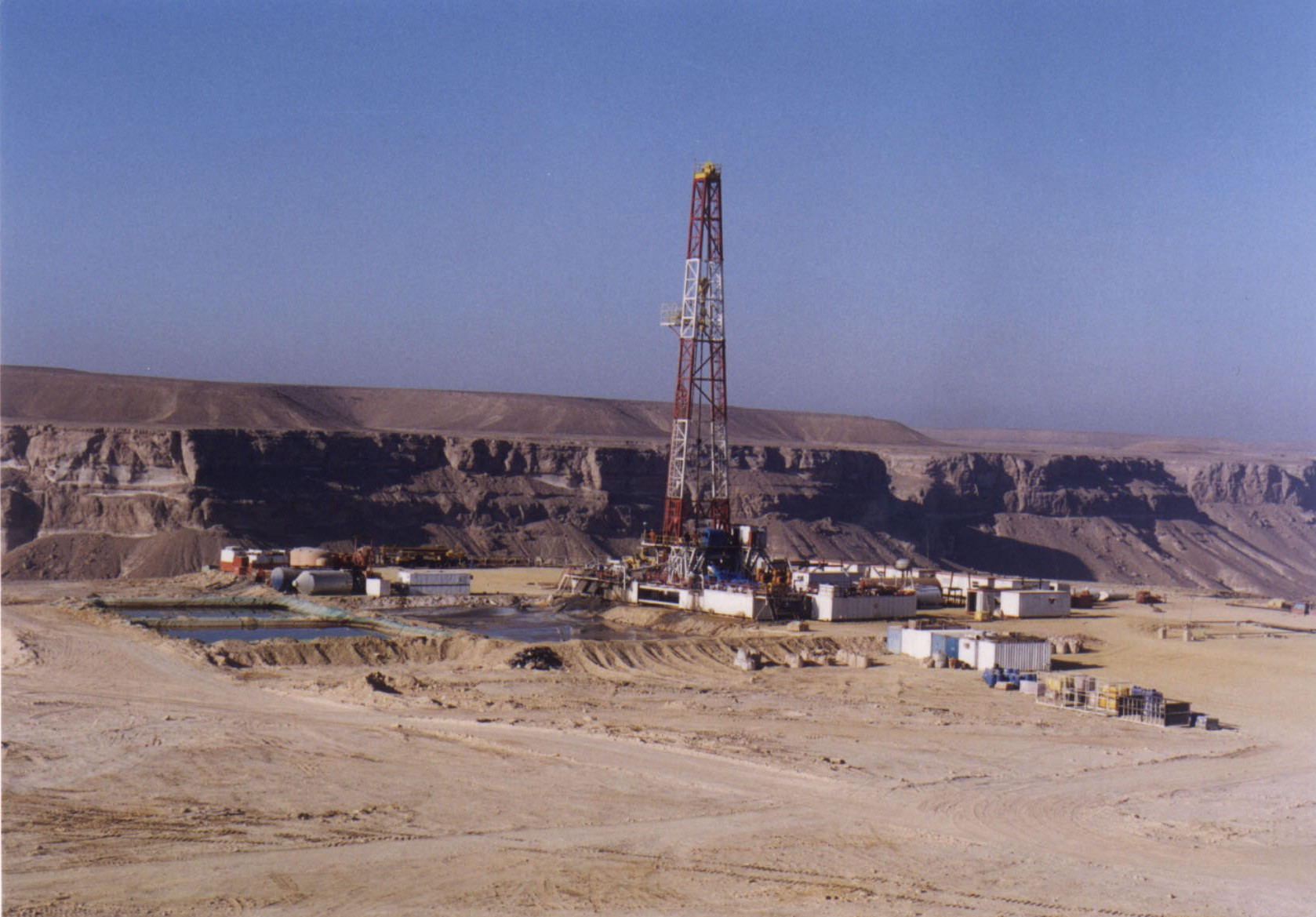
An oil drill in Hadhramaut

In August 2005, the government gave final approval to three LNG supply agreements, enabling YLNG to award a $2 billion contract to an international consortium to build the country's first liquefaction plant at Balhaf on the Arabian Sea coast. The project is a $3.7 billion investment over 25 years, producing approximately 6.7 million tons of LNG annually, with shipments likely to go to the United States and South Korea. Production of LNG began in October 2009. The Yemen government expects the LNG project to add $350 million to its budget and enable it to develop a petrochemicals industry.

Hadramout produces approximately 258.8 thousand barrels per day. One of the prominent oil fields is the Masila Basin Sector (14), discovered in 1993. Oil contributes between 30% and 40% of the gross domestic product (GDP) value and represents more than 70% of the total general budget revenues of the state. Moreover, it constitutes more than 90% of the country's export value.

== Culture ==
=== Music and dance ===
Mizmar Al-Habeesh (Arabic: مزمار الهبيش), a Coastal Hadhrami song

Hadhrami Music is one of the five main Yemeni musical genres or "colours" (alwan). It comprises vocal performances in the Hadhrami Arabic dialect and features melodic phrases and a characteristic humming-style known as the Dan. Hadhramaut's strategic location along the ancient incense road has shaped a unique musical tradition. Indian and African musical elements have intermingled with indigenous forms over time. Besides, It has been deeply influenced by Sufism.

The Shabwani music and dance

The region is renowned for its vast array of over four hundred distinct rhythmic patterns that vary by locality. These rhythms are closely tied to daily activities and special occasions, from planting and fishing to wedding celebrations. A key musical form in the region is the Dan, a fixed melodic structure in which the melody precedes the lyrics; in contrast, in other songs, the lyrics typically come before the melody. Steps have been taken by the Yemeni government to include the Dan art on UNESCO Intangible Cultural Heritage, Cultural authorities in Yemen have already received initial approval from UNESCO to consider its inclusion.

Numerous art critics note that the Hadhrami Dan has played a pivotal role in shaping vocal traditions throughout the Arab world, particularly within the Gulf region. This distinctive musical form is regarded as a foundational element for many singing schools, with contemporary artists continuing to draw inspiration from its rich heritage and folkloric melodies.

The Hadhrami Dan has spread to the Arabian Gulf through the migration of Hadhrami musicians who settled in Gulf countries. Over time, local musicians integrated the Hadhrami Dan and other forms of the Dan and other Hadhrami musical forms into their own repertoires. Furthermore, Hadhrami music has significantly influenced the cultural landscapes of regions beyond the Arabian Peninsula, notably in parts of Africa and East Asia.

Abu Bakr Salem and Ahmed Fathi perform (Hadrami Arabic: غدر الليل, romanized: Ghadar al-Layl, lit. 'Night Has Come')

Several Hadhrami influential musicians and poets played an important role in shaping Hadhrami and the wider Arabian music. Abu Bakr Salem Belfkih (1932–2017), for example, modernised al-Dân songs by incorporating contemporary musical instruments, while poets such as Haddad al-Kaff (1910–1970) and Hussein al-Mihdhar (1932–2000) enriched the tradition with their lyrics. Additionally, Mohammed Juma Khan (1903–1963) is celebrated as a pioneer who blended his Punjabi musical influences with local traditions.

Moreover, several prominent non-Hadhrami Arab musicians have also embraced Hadhrami styles. These include Kuwaiti singer Abdallah Al Rowaished; Saudi singers Abdul Majeed Abdullah and Abdel Rab Idris, the latter of Hadhrami origin; as well as Emirati singers Ahlam and Hussain Al Jassmi.

The instruments used in Hadhrami music vary widely, encompassing percussion instruments, string instruments, wind instruments, and simple clapping techniques, often used individually or in combination. This includes notably the Qanbūs, which the Hadhrami migrants spread across the Indian Ocean across the Muslim Southeast Asia areas (notably in Indonesia, Malaysia, and Brunei).

== Demographics ==
The people of the region are known as the Hadharem, generally belong to the Semitic south Arabians who claim descent from Yarub bin Qahtan. There is, however, a large number of Sada (Hadrami Arabic: سادة, romanized: Sadah; Singular: Sayyid), or descendant of the Islamic Prophet Muhammad, and of townsmen of northern origin, besides a considerable class of African or mixed descent. The Sada, descendants of Husain ibn Ali, grandson of the Islamic Prophet, form a numerous and highly respected aristocracy. They are divided into families, the chiefs of which are known as Munsibs, who are looked on as the religious leaders of the people and are even, in some cases are regarded with great respect as saints. Among the leading families are that of Sheikh Abu Bakar bin Salem (Hadrami Arabic: الشيخ ابو بكر بن سالم) of ʽAynat, al-Aidarus (Hadrami Arabic: العيدروس) of Shihr and Wadi Dawan, Bin Sumayt (Hadrami Arabic: بن سميط) of Shibam and the Sakkaf (Hadrami Arabic: سقاف) of Seiyun. They do not bear arms, nor occupy themselves in trade, nor manual labour, nor even agriculture; though owning a large proportion of the land, they employ labourers to cultivate it. As compared with the other classes, they are well educated and are strict in their observance of religious duties, and owing to the respect due to their descent, they exercise a strong influence both in temporal and spiritual affairs.

The Mashayikh (Hadrami Arabic: المشايخ) is another highly regarded group that is second in prestige to the Sada. Like the Sada, they don't bear arms. Men from this group are given the honorific surname Sheikh (Hadrami Arabic: شيخ) and women are given the surname Sheikha (Hadrami Arabic: شيخة) which is different from the term Sheikh (Arabic: شيخ) that is used to refer to a tribal chief or a Muslim scholar. Prominent Mashayikh families include the ‘Amudi (Hadrami Arabic: العمودي), Ba Wazir (Hadrami Arabic: با وزير), and Ba ‘Abbad (Hadrami Arabic: با عبّاد) families.

The Qaba'il (Hadrami Arabic: القبائل) or tribesmen, as in the rest of Arabia, are the predominant class in the population. All the adults carry arms. Some of the tribes have settled towns and villages, others live a bedouin life, keeping however within the territory which is recognised as belonging to the tribe. They are divided into sections or families, each headed by a chief while the head of the tribe is called the muqaddam or sultan. He is the leader in peace and in war, but the tribesmen are not his subjects; he can only rule with their support. Historically, the most powerful tribes in Hadhramaut was the Qu’aiti, a branch of the Yafa'a tribe. Originally invited by the Sada to protect the settled districts against the marauding tribes, they established themselves as rulers of the country, and possessed the coastal districts with the towns of Mukalla and Shihr as well as Shibam in the interior. The family had accumulated great wealth and was in the service of the Nizam of Hyderabad in India as commander of the Arab levy composed of his tribesmen.

The townsmen are the free inhabitants of the towns and villages as distinguished from the Sada and the tribesmen; they do not carry arms, but are the working members of the community, merchants, artificers, cultivators, and servants and are entirely dependent on the tribes and chiefs under whose protection they live. The servile class contains a large African element, brought over formerly when the slave trade flourished on this coast.

=== Hadhrami diaspora ===
Map of Hadhrami emigrations around the world

Since the early 19th century, large-scale Hadhramaut migration has established sizable Hadhrami minorities all around the Indian Ocean, in South Asia, Southeast Asia and East Africa, including Mombasa, Hyderabad, Aurangabad, Maharashtrian Konkan, Mangalore, Bhatkal, Gangolli, Malabar, Sylhet, Tanzania, the Malay Archipelago, Sri Lanka, southern Philippines and Singapore. In Hyderabad and Aurangabad, the community is known as Chaush and resides mostly in the neighborhood of Barkas. There are also settlements of Hadharem in Gujarat, such as in Ahmadabad and Surat. In South India, the Nawayath community also descends from Hadrami traders.

Earlier, several sultans in the Malay Archipelago such as the Malacca Sultanate, Pontianak Sultanate or Sultanate of Siak Sri Indrapura were descents of Hadharem . In the 19th century, Hadhrami businessmen owned many of the maritime armada of barks, brigs, schooners and other ships in the Malay archipelago. In modern times, several Indonesian ministers, including former Foreign Minister Ali Alatas and former Finance Minister Mar'ie Muhammad are of Hadhrami descent, as is the former Prime Minister of East Timor, Mari Alkatiri.

The Hadharem have also settled in large numbers along the East African coast, and two former ministers in Kenya, Shariff Nasser and Najib Balala, are of Hadhrami descent. Genetic evidence also demonstrates that the Lemba people of Southern Africa bear some relation to the people of Hadramaut.

Within the region there has been a historical Jewish population.

== See also ==
- Hejaz
- Tihamah
- Al-Yamama
- Najd
- Greater Yemen
