= Aynat =

Aynat may refer to the following places:

- `Aynat, a village in eastern Yemen
- Bédeilhac-et-Aynat, a commune in the Ariège department of southwestern France
