= Brom Mayfa district =

Brom Mayfa District مديرية بروم ميفع
- District
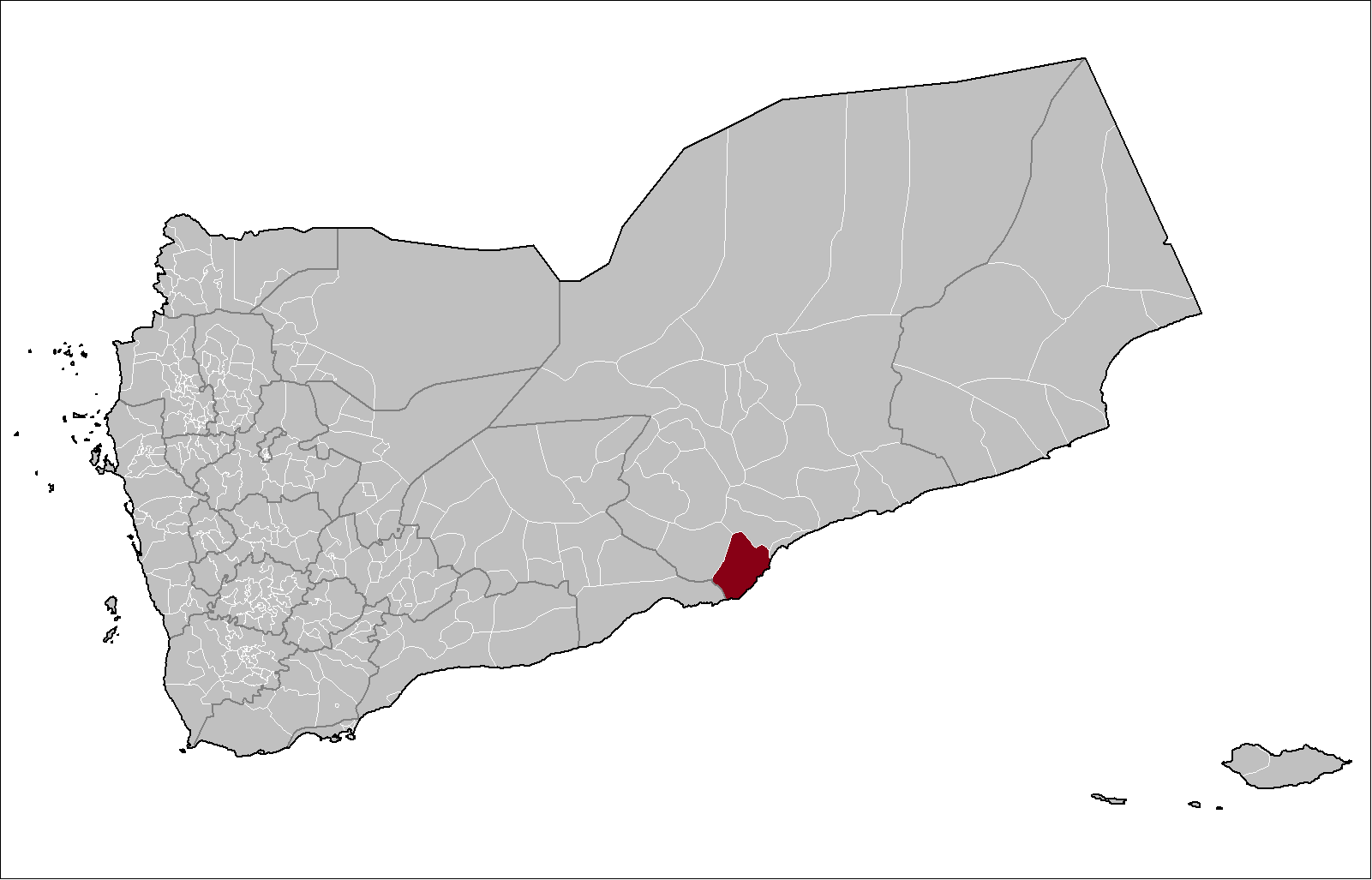
- The district highlighted in Yemen
- Country: Yemen
- Governorate: Hadhramaut
- Capital: Burum

Population (2021)
  - Total: 27,346
- Time zone: UTC+3 (Yemen Standard Time)

Brom Mayfa District (Arabic: مديرية بروم ميفع) is a district of the Hadhramaut Governorate, Yemen. As of 2021, the district had a population of 27,346 inhabitants.
