= Haid al-Jazil =

Human settlement in Hadhramaut, Yemen

Coordinates: 15°09′57″N 48°25′17″E

Haid al-Jazil حيد الجزيل
- Village
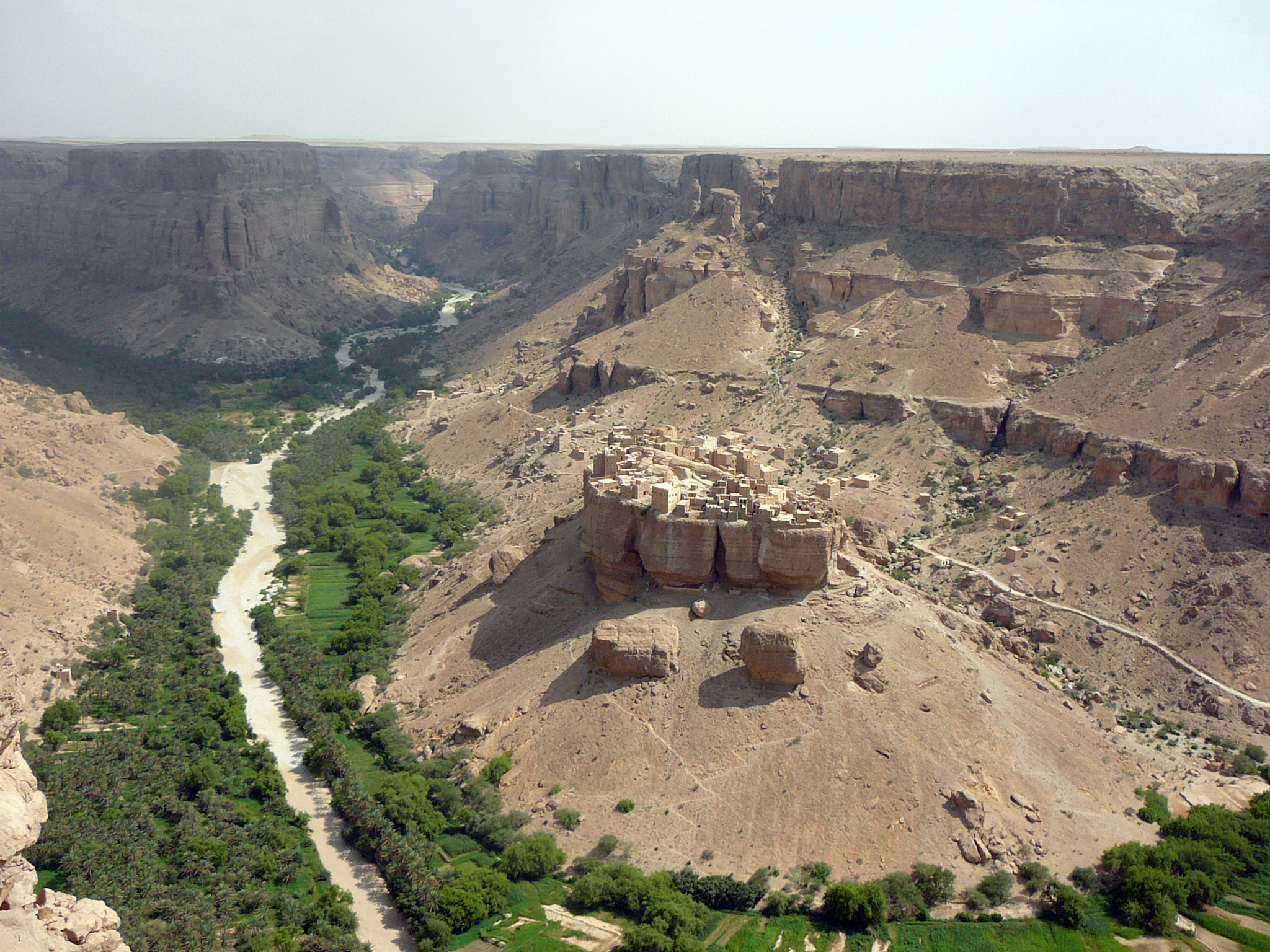
- Aerial View of Haid al-Jazil
- Interactive map of Haid al-Jazil
- Country: Yemen
- Governorate: Hadhramaut
- Time zone: UTC+3 (Yemen Standard Time)

Haid al-Jazil is one of the villages in Daw'an District in Hadhramaut Governorate, which has a population of 17 according to the 2004 census. The mud-brick buildings of the village are built on a huge boulder overlooking the Wadi Dawan valley.
