= Burum, Yemen =

Coordinates: 14°22′N 48°59′E

Burum
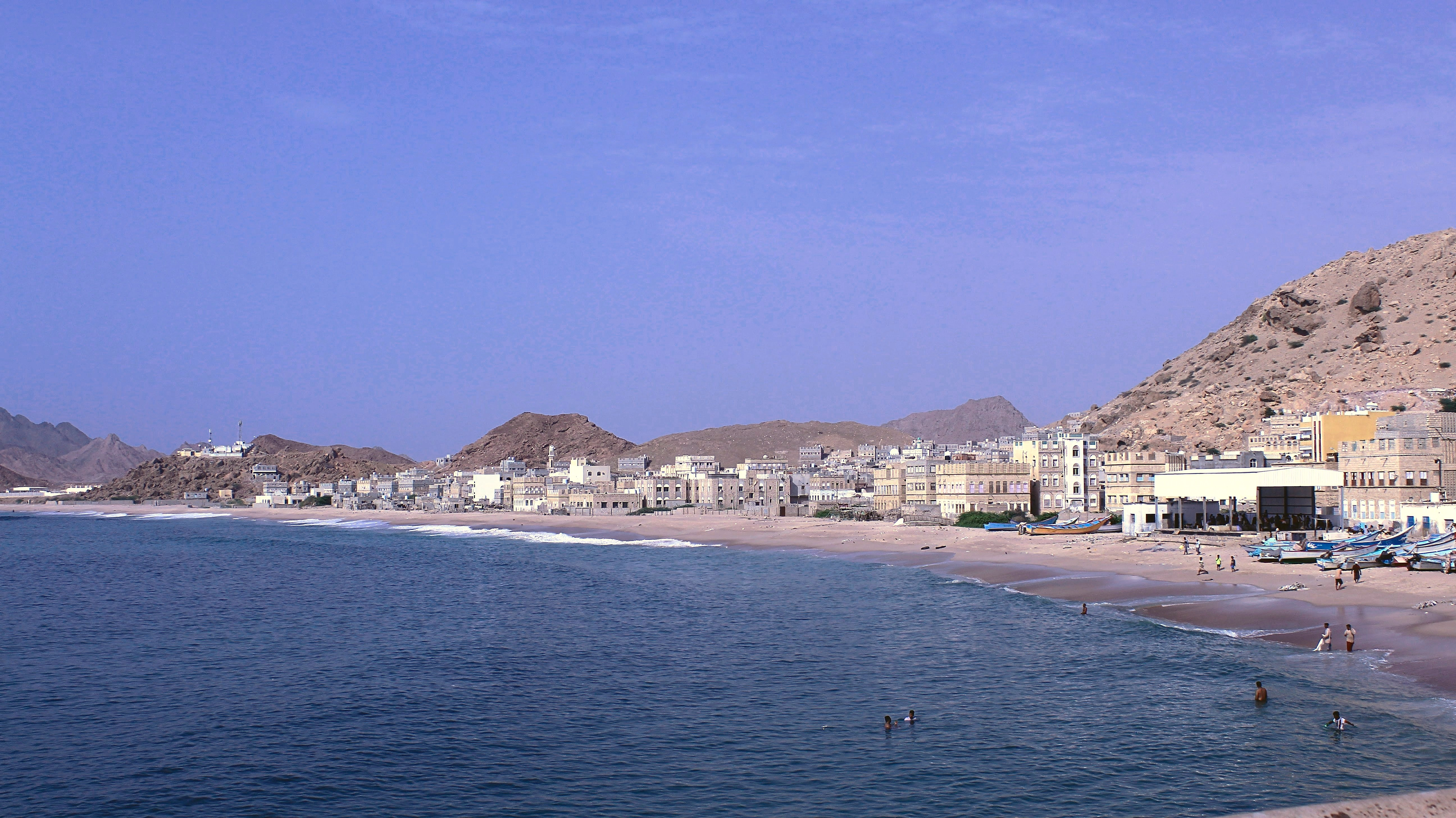
- View of Burum
- Interactive map of Burum
- Country: Yemen
- Governorate: Hadhramaut
- Time zone: UTC+3 (Yemen Standard Time)

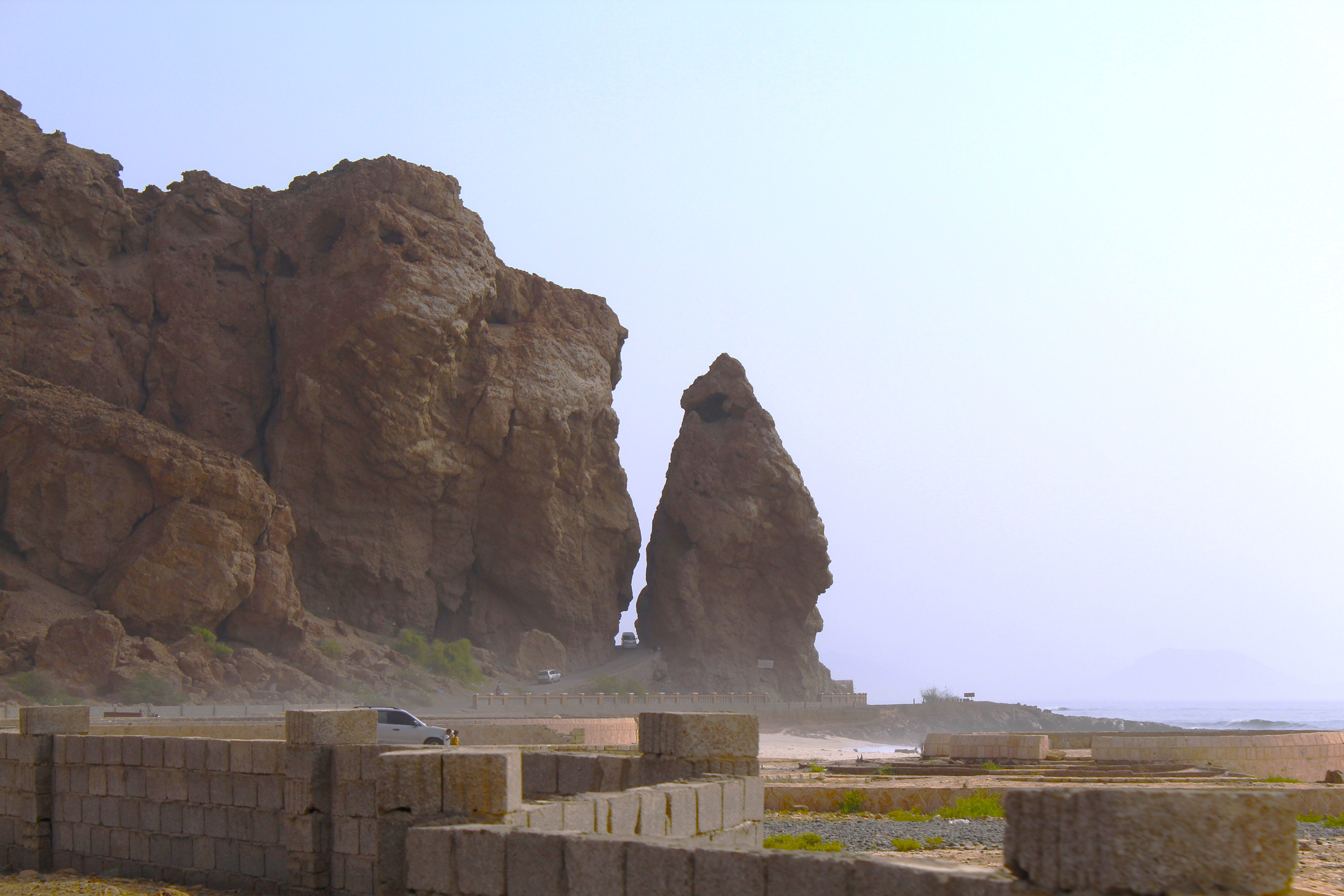
Al-Shaggain in Burum

Burum is a village in eastern Yemen. It is located in the Hadhramaut Governorate.
