= ʽAynat =

Coordinates: 16°04′N 49°09′E

`Aynat
- Interactive map of `Aynat
- Country: Yemen
- Governorate: Hadhramaut
- Time zone: UTC+3 (Yemen Standard Time)

`Aynat is a village in eastern Yemen. It is located in the Hadhramaut Governorate.
