= Sa'eed ibn Isa Al-Amoudi =

Sunni Shafi'i Islamic scholar

Wali Allah Arif Billah Mawla Qaydun Qutb Sheikh Sa'eed ibn Isa al-Amoudi
- الشيخ سعيد بن عيسى العمودي

Personal life
- Born: 600 AH (1203/1204 CE) Qaydun, Wādī Dawʿan, Hadhramaut, Yemen
- Died: 671 AH (1272 CE) Qaydun, Wādī Dawʿan, Hadhramaut, Yemen
- Resting place: Sheikh Sa'eed ibn Isa Mosque, Qaydun, Wādī Dawʿan, Hadhramaut, Yemen
- Home town: Qaydun
- Spouse: Bint Ahmed Al-Kindi
- Children: Sheikh Muhammad ibn Sa'eed Al-Amoudi; Sheikh Ali ibn Sa'eed Al-Amoudi
- Parents: Sheikh Isa ibn Ahmad Al-Amoudi (father); Sibanid Himyarite woman (mother)
- Region: Hadhramaut
- Known for: Forefather of the Al-Amoudi Emirate rulers and being a prominent Islamic scholar and saint of Hadhramaut

Religious life
- Religion: Islam
- Denomination: Sunni
- Jurisprudence: Shafi'i
- Tariqa: Tariqah Al-Amoudiyyah
- Creed: Ash'ari

Muslim leader
- Teacher: Abu Madyan Shu'ayb Al-Andalusi; Sayyid Muhammad ibn Ali Ba'Alawi

Sheikh Sa‘eed ibn ‘Isa al- 'Amoudi (1203/1204-1272) (Arabic:الشيخ سعيد بن عيسى العمودي) was a prominent Sunni Shafi'i Islamic scholar and Sufi saint of Hadhramawt. Venerated as the patron saint of the Wadi Daw'an, he had exercised significant spiritual influence and leadership in religious affairs in the region. This influence would be inherited by his descendants, the al-'Amoudi family. The family would go on to establish an influential political bastion in resistance to growing Ottoman power in Yemen and found the town of Budha which would serve as the headquarters of the al-Amoudi family.

== Family background and upbringing ==
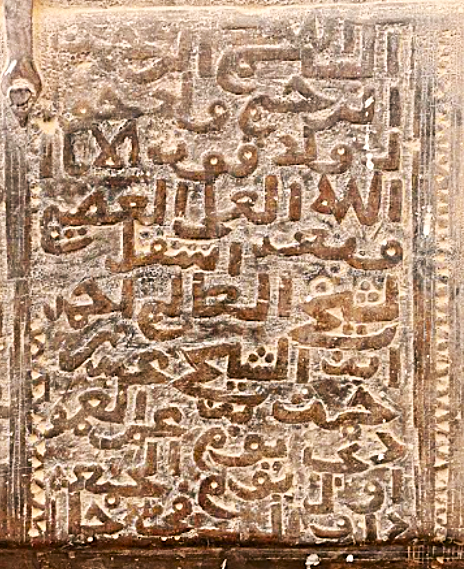
Inscription on grave of Sheikh Sa'eed ibn Isa Al-Amoudi

Sheikh Sa‘eed ibn ‘Isa al-‘Amoudi al-Bakri al-Siddiqi al-Hadhrami was born in the year 600 Hijri (1203/1204 CE) in the town of Qaydun in the Wadi Dawʿan region of Hadhramawt in Yemen. His father Sheikh 'Isa ibn Ahmad al-‘Amoudi was originally an inhabitant of Medina and was also a scholar of Shafi'ite law, he had decided to visit Nubia to spread Islamic learning with five of his sons, Ibrahim, Ahmad, Abd Allah, Musa and Dawood, after years passed he further went on to Abyssinia, leaving his sons back in Nubia where his descendants continue to live till the present day. ‘Isa ibn Ahmad after spending time in Abyssinia decided that it was time to return to his home city of Medina as he longed to see his relatives, as he had not seen them in many years, and so he boarded a ship with the intent of doing so, while he was on the ship, he met Hadhrami Sibanid tribesmen, they begged him to come with them to Hadhramaut so that they may benefit from his knowledge and counsel. Eventually being convinced after much persuasion, he settled in Qaydun where the Banu Muhammad of the Himayarite Siban tribe married to him a woman from themselves, this woman would be Sheikh Sa‘eed ibn ‘Isa al-‘Amoudi's mother. ‘Isa ibn Ahmad's migration out of Medina to spread knowledge about the religion was much like his uncle, ‘Abd al-Qadir ibn Sa‘eed al-‘Amoudi's migration to Palestine. Isa ibn Ahmad was a fifth generation descendant of Hejazi saint and his son's namesake Sa‘eed ibn Abi al-Ruh 'Isa al-Bakri who was known as ‘Amoud al-Din meaning Pillar of the religion, due to his habit of standing in Salah for prolonged periods much like a 'pillar', thus the family name al-‘Amoudi derives from him. Sa‘eed 'Amoud al-Din ibn ‘Isa al-Bakri in turn was a ninth-generation descendant of the first Muslim Caliph Abu Bakr al-Ṣiddiq ’s eldest son ‘Abd al-Rahman. Sheikh Sa‘eed ibn ‘Isa al-‘Amoudi’s lineage back to him as follows is;

Sa‘eed ibn ‘Isa ibn Ahmad ibn Sha‘ban ibn Sa‘eed ibn Ahmad ibn Sa‘eed ‘Amoud al-Din ibn Abi al-Ruh ‘Isa ibn Sha‘ban ibn ‘Isa ibn Dawood ibn Muḥammad ibn Abu Bakr Nuh ibn Talha ibn ‘Abd Allah ibn ‘Abd al-Rahman ibn Abi Bakr al-Siddiq al-Taymi al-Qurashi.

Sa‘eed ibn ‘Isa in his youth was diligent in attending the lessons of local scholars of Qaydun, being eager to learn from them.

== His learning of Tasawwuf and his works ==
Sa’eed ibn Isa Al-Amoudi had initially learnt and took from the Tariqah of Abu Madyan Shu’ayb ibn Husayn Al-Andalusi, a Maliki Sufi master of Andalusian origin residing in Morocco who himself was a student of the renowned Hanbali saint Abdul Qadir Jilani. Among others who learnt from Abu Madyan Shu’ayb were Ibn Hammad and Ibn Arabi. Sa’eed ibn Isa became exposed to the ways of Abu Madyan via his envoy to Hadhramaut, Sheikh Abdullah al-Salih al-Maghribi. Sa’eed ibn Isa was also a student of the founder of the Ba’Alawi Tariqah, Faqih Al-Muqaddam Sayyid Muhammad ibn Ali Ba’Alawi, Muhammad ibn Ali himself was also a student of Abu Madyan Shu’ayb.

Together with Sayyid Muhammad ibn Ali Ba’Alawi, Sheikh Sa’eed ibn Isa Al-Amoudi went to Tarim and decided to break their swords, as a symbol of the transition from the prevailing aspects of social life in that era, to the life of asceticism and abandoning politics, as the sword at that time symbolized plunder, robbery, crime, and the pursuit of rule, revenge, and retaliation.

Sheikh Sa’eed ibn Isa Al-Amoudi after years of learning under different Sufi Mashaikh and their different methods was able to develop his own way of Tasawwuf, which would be known as the Tariqah Al-Amoudiyyah, which is one of the renowned twenty three different ways of Tasawwuf that took root in Hadhramaut as is mentioned by the Hadhrami scholar Abdur Rahman ibn Abdullah Balfaqih in his work, Raf’a Al-Ustar, ‘Raising the Curtains.’ This way of Tasawwuf is prevalent in Hadhramaut, especially amongst his direct descendants, the Al-Amoudi family and in other Hadhrami diaspora areas such as in the Malay Archipelago and Indian Subcontinent where his descendants spread with the Hadhrami migrations.

== Staff of Moses and Coat of Joseph ==
Abu Madyan Shu’ayb of Morocco was alleged to have had possession of the Staff of Moses and the Coat of Joseph, and he had stipulated in his will before his demise in 1198 CE, that they be sent to Faqih Al-Muqaddam Sayyid Muhammad ibn Ali Ba’Alawi in Hadhramaut. Thus after the death of Abu Madyan Shu’ayb, an envoy took the staff and started travelling to Hadhramaut via Iraq, stopping at Mecca whereupon he had become ill and died. So, another man continued the journey with the staff and coat and arrived in Tarim where it came to the hands of Sayyid Muhammad ibn Ali Ba’Alawi. Sheikh Sa’eed ibn Isa Al-Amoudi was a great friend and student of Muhammad ibn Ali, and so he gave the Staff of Moses and the Coat of Joseph to him in order to honor him. Sa’eed ibn Isa had died in his region of birth, the Wadi Daw’an and so the staff and coat are now in the custodianship of his descendants whose headquarters are in the village of Budha.

The staff in possession of the Al-Amoudi family is stated to be three cubits tall, this is contrary to the well-accepted description of the Staff of Moses being ten cubits long. Additionally, the staff in the possession of the Al-Amoudi family is described as having a sweet smell, a tip made of whitish brass tinged with silver and black smudge marks over it. The alleged coat is inside a cubed-shaped bundle of yellow satin which itself is kept inside green velvet, the Al-Amoudi family though is claimed to have never opened up the bundle to see it. The staff and coat regularly attracts visitors in Hadhramaut, and from the Hadhrami diaspora, it is in the possession of Sheikh Mutahar Abood Al-Amoudi as of 2007.

== Sayings of Sa’eed ibn Isa Al-Amoudi ==
Ahmed ibn Abi Al-Ja'ad asked him about the nature of the path of Tasawwuf, to this Sa’eed ibn Isa replied; “The path of Tasawwuf is path of the Muhaqiq, the one that seeks the truth and the path of the Mujtahid, the jurist. The path of the Muhaqiq is abandoning people, cutting worldly ties and striving to be a Khadim of Al-Malik, The King, Al-Khaliq, The Creator. The path of the Mujtahid is observing Sawm, standing in Salah and abandoning sins.”

Sa’eed ibn Isa was asked about the attributes of Faqeer As-Sabr, the patient one that has renounced worldly wealth, to this he said; “ He should wear a coat of mail to protect him from affliction, a cloak to protect him from isolation, a robe to protect him from loss of humility, trousers to protect him from loss of chastity, a cloak to protect him from loss of modesty, a cloak to protect him from loss of vigilance, a staff to protect him from loss of trust, a torch to protect him from loss of steadfastness, a sandal to protect him from loss of patience, and a toothpick to protect him from loss of contentment. He should take a corner of knowledge and a drink of wisdom. When he stands at the door of Al-Malik, he has reached the end. When he reaches the end, he will be given strange qualities by which he will be known. When he is known by them, he will be finer than water and higher than the sky, and his side will be more fertile than summer. His ambition is sharper than the sword, and his speech prevents injustice. He is like the sea, in which the washer washes and the eater eats from its fish. The one who enters it is relieved from the fatigue of the distance, and it saves him from fear. If he speaks, he is truthful, and if he is told, he is believed. He is fair to himself, but does not seek justice for himself. Whatever Allah provides him, he is satisfied with and content, and he does not wrong any of the creation of Allah, and if he is wronged, he is patient and forgives.”

Sa’eed ibn Isa was asked about the status of a Sheikh, and the one who deserves to be one, he replied;

“To have a wandering mind, a substantial thought, a beautiful debate, a generous reviewer, great patience, abundant knowledge, broad-minded, humble soul, his speech is a smile, his questioning is learning, he reminds the heedless, and teaches the ignorant, he does not rejoice over a calamity, nor does he mention anyone in absentia, he is trustworthy with trusts, far from betrayal, he does not treat those who are ignorant of him with ignorance, he is happy with those who come to him, he is friendly with the stranger, he helps the Muslims in every matter that is shameful, he is a father to the orphan, he helps the weak, the forlorn. His heart, happy with his Lord, is lonely with the people of this world. He is not stingy, nor is he hasty, nor does he seek revenge, nor does he get angry with those who harm him, but rather he is patient, and forgives, and does not delve into what does not concern him. If he is insulted, he does not insult, and if he is asked, he does not refuse, and if he is refused, he does not get angry. He is softer than foam, and sweeter than honey, close to goodness and its people, far from evil and its people. He does not get angry except by the judgment of His justice, knowing the principles and branches of the religion.”

== Legacy and death ==
Sheikh Sa’eed ibn Isa Al-Amoudi married the daughter of Ahmed ibn Sa’eed Ba’ Wa’ar of the Banu Afif of the Kindah and had three sons Isa, Muhammad and Ali. His son Isa had died young and left no descendants, and so his bloodline continued through his other sons, Muhammad and Ali. Sa'eed ibn Isa died in around 1272 CE in his birth town Qaydun in the Wadi Daw’an. He was buried next to his Masjid, now called Sheikh Sa’eed ibn Isa Al-Amoudi Masjid in Qaydun, his grave is a major attraction site in Hadhramaut.

Sa’eed ibn Isa had extensive religious and spiritual influence in Hadhramaut, and his Mansab, his status as a leader in religious affairs was inherited by his sons Muhammad and Ali, with Sheikh Muhammad ibn Sa’eed Al-Amoudi being his successor, in his position Muhammad ibn Sa’eed was able to further strengthen his father’s legacy in Hadhrami society, and so did his successors. It got to an extent that tribal chiefs and army men rallied around the Al-Amoudi family, thus giving the family political influence as well with religious authority. The first one to use this political power was Sheikh Abdullah ibn Muhammad Al-Amoudi, great-great-great grandson of Sa’eed ibn Isa who conquered the town of Al-Khurayba in the year 1433 CE. The Al-Amoudi family would establish a sovereign sheikhdom-state, in opposition to the Al-Kathiri Sultanate's pro-Ottoman policies in 1531 CE under the leadership of Sheikh Uthman ibn Ahmed Al-Amoudi which would sustain until 1899 CE whereupon it fell to the Al-Quaiti Sultanate.

His descendants, the Al-Amoudi family also established the village Budha during their political tenure, which served as the capital of their state. The Al-Amoudi family is considered the most important family amongst the Mashayikh clans of Hadhramaut which includes families like the Ba Wazir and Ba 'Abbad, due to their historical political importance and Bakrid descent. The family holds significant influence in the spiritual scene of Hadhramaut alongside the Ba 'Alawi sada.

== See also ==
- List of Sufis
- List of Ash'aris and Maturidis
