= Salim Ahmed bin Mahfouz =

Saudi Arabian businessman

- Born: 1910; Al-Hajarayn, Dawan, Hadhramaut
- Died: 1994 (aged 83–84); Jeddah, Saudi Arabia
- Resting place: Jeddah
- Occupations: Businessman, Banker
- Known for: 5th Top Billionaire of 1987 and co-founder of Saudi National Bank
- Title: Bin Mahfouz
- Spouse: Aisha Muhammad Abd al-Wahid Kaaki

Salim bin Ahmed bin Al Shaiba bin Mahfouz (Arabic: سالم بن أحمد بن الشيبة بن محفوظ) was a Saudi businessman of Hadhrami origin, and the founder of the National Commercial Bank.

== The journey of wealth ==
Bin Mahfouz first worked as a governor in Mecca, recognizing his abilities and having confidence in him, the Al-Kaki family opted to partner with him in their money-changing business. He then became a correspondent for them.

Salim bin Mahfouz, according to his own account, proposed the idea of a Saudi bank during a newspaper meeting. The Minister of Finance at that time, Ibn Suleiman, was impressed and arranged a meeting for bin Mahfouz with King Abdulaziz Al Saud. The King liked the idea, and soon after, Al-Salam, the first Saudi bank – the Saudi National Commercial Bank – was established. It went on to become the largest banking institution in the Middle East.

== Death ==
He died in 1994.

== Salim Bin Mahfouz Foundation ==
His children started the Salim Bin Mahfouz Foundation for Civil and Development Work in 2012.
