= Wadi Doan =

Wadi Doan وَادِي دَوْعَن
- Wadi
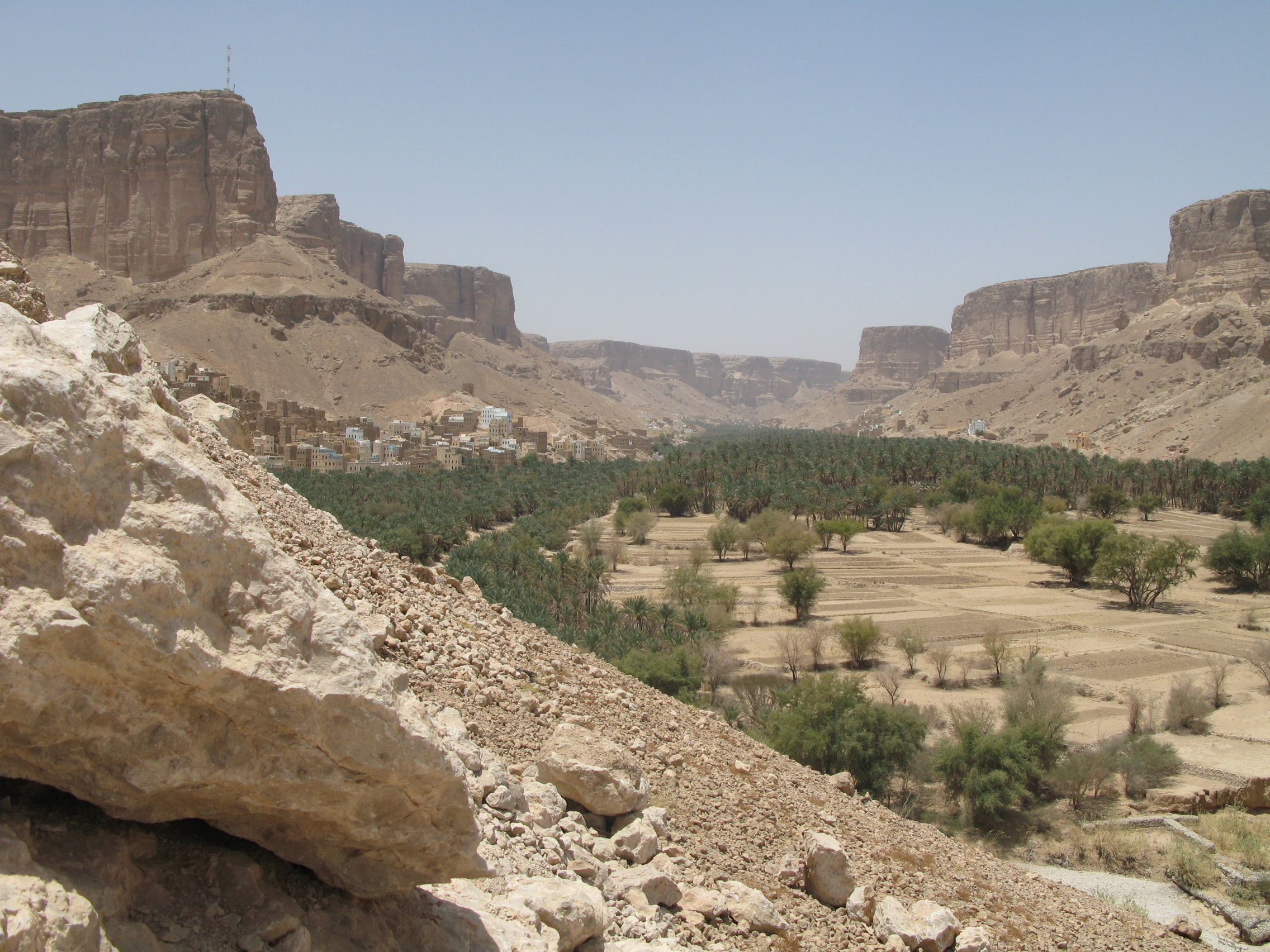
- Wadi Doan
- Nickname: Wadi of Honey
- Location in Yemen
- Coordinates: 15°15′51″N 48°20′27″E
- Country: Yemen
- Governorate: Hadhramaut
- District: Daw'an District

Area
  - Total: 3,546 km^{2} (1,369 sq mi)
- Elevation: 1,358 m (4,455 ft)

Population (2004)
  - Total: 50,992
- Time zone: UTC+03:00 (Yemen Standard Time)
- Website: https://www.had-wadidoan.info/

Wadi Doan (Arabic: وَادِي دَوْعَن, romanized: Wādī Daw‘an) is a wadi (desert valley) located in the Hadhramaut Governorate of central Yemen. It is a significant tributary of the larger Wadi Hadhramaut and features narrow canyons and clustered villages with towering mud-built houses. It is noted for its mudbrick tower house architecture and honey production.

== Geography ==
Wadi Dawan is considerably narrower than the main Wadi Hadhramaut. It is characterized by clustered villages nestled along its canyon walls, with unique mudbrick tower houses. The surrounding landscape is marked by sandstone and limestone cliffs. The Ministry of Culture has proposed protecting Wadi Dawan as a national park, alongside developing a comprehensive infrastructure plan for the area. Unlike Wadi Hadhramaut, the road within Wadi Dawan remained largely unpaved, and as of a 1997 study, this has influenced the preservation of traditional construction methods.

== Architecture ==
The architecture of Wadi Dawan primarily consists of mudbrick buildings, supplemented by dry stone retaining walls, cisterns, and irrigation systems. The traditional mud-built houses are tall and often appear to climb up the wadi's banks, standing close together.

=== Mudbrick Houses ===
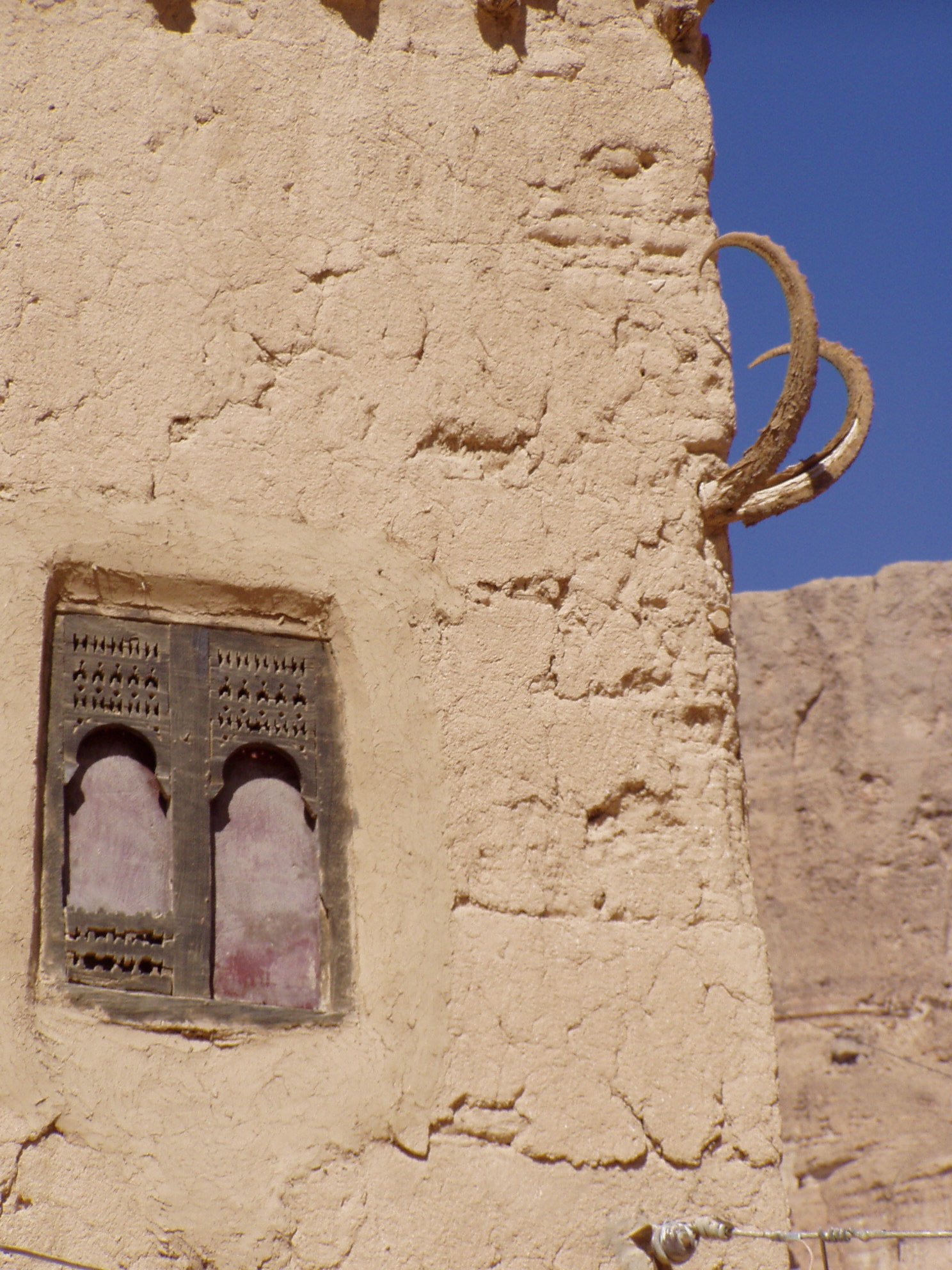
House in Sif with ibex horns

The mudbrick tower houses in Wadi Dawan are prominent in villages such as al-Hajarayn, Budah, Hadun, Al Girn, Khoreibah, and Rabat Bai'sheen. These structures can resemble medieval fortifications. Older houses sometimes feature projecting upper floors over main doorways, historically used for defensive purposes like pouring liquids onto adversaries. Parapets on these buildings are often crenelated and occasionally adorned with ibex horns.

A distinguishing characteristic of homes in Wadi Dawan is a more defined separation between living areas for women and men, often achieved through terraced setbacks, leading newer houses to sometimes appear as two distinct pavilions or have a U-shaped layout.

=== Interior Design ===
While the exteriors of many houses in Wadi Dawan have minimal whitewash, the interiors of more affluent dwellings are often immaculately white. The interior color schemes frequently incorporate black, white, and rusty red. Lofty ceilings are supported by carved pillars and rafters made from 'elb (jujube or Ziziphus spina-christi) wood. Interior woodwork is also made from this material. Doors are set within broad, intricately carved frames and are extensively decorated with large, burnished iron nails. A modern feature in Wadi Dawan houses is the inclusion of an ablution room in every living space, making them self-contained units. Main living rooms often feature a Moorish arch instead of a door, which can be part of a whitewashed wall or made of stained 'elb wood studded with nails. The mud floors of upper stories are laid over traditional wood slats arranged in herringbone patterns. Unlike homes in Tarim, furniture in Wadi Dawan and Shibam typically consists of cushions and carpets.

=== Construction Techniques ===
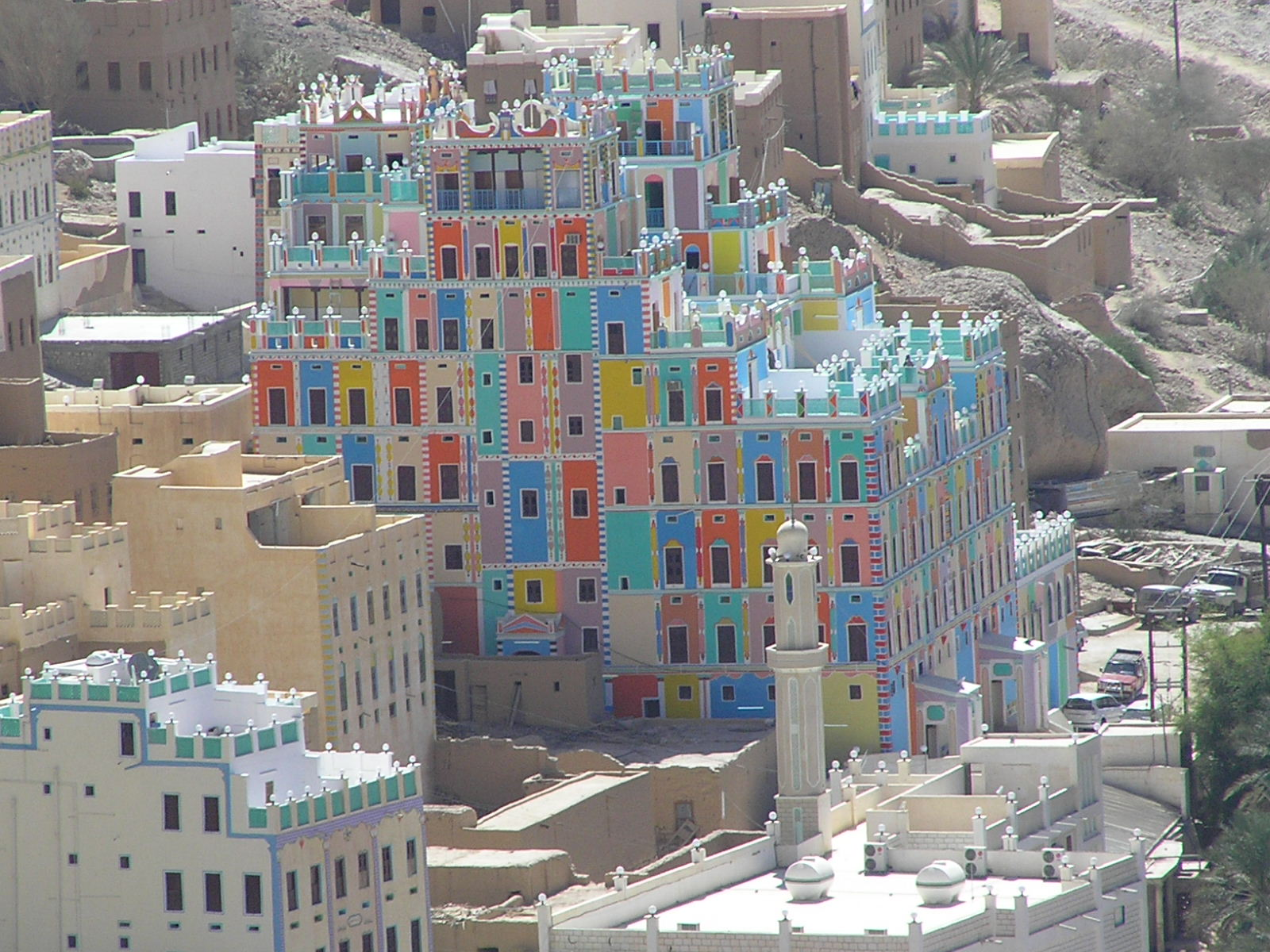
A Bugshan family palace in Khailah

The process of making mudbricks (madhar) in Wadi Dawan largely follows ancient methods. Mudbrick yards are located on the outskirts of towns for sun-drying bricks. Masons in Wadi Dawan gather suitable mud from around date palms following floods. Chopped straw is mixed with the mud to prevent shrinkage and provide reinforcement, and in some areas, like Khoreibah, dung is also added. The ratio of straw to mud is determined by the experience of the master mason. Mudbricks vary in size depending on their intended floor level, with thicker bricks used for lower stories and thinner ones for higher floors, contributing to a decrease in wall thickness and floor-to-ceiling height as the building rises.

Stone foundations, sourced from local mountains, are used as damp courses and are shaped by stone-cutters. These foundations are typically filled with soil and stones to create level platforms. Traditionally, before the widespread use of cement, a hydraulic mortar called khaltah (a mix of ash and lime putty) was employed for foundations. Mud mortar, made from the same soil as the bricks but with a different type of wild grass for reinforcement, is used to stack mudbricks. Mud plaster (mahadha) is also applied to walls, typically with finer chopped straw.

Construction often proceeds incrementally, with no more than one story built per year, allowing time for drying and settling. Timber is horizontally and diagonally embedded within mudbrick walls to reinforce corners. Roofs and floors are also constructed from mud, with tightly spaced date palm joists. Lime plaster is widely used for waterproofing and decoration, particularly on parapets and roofs, as full exterior lime plastering is considered a display of wealth. The Bugshan family palaces in Khailah, within a branch of Wadi Dawan, are noted for their elaborate oil-based painted decorations on exteriors.

Historically, cement use in Wadi Dawan was limited to mortar for stone foundations and occasionally for waterproofing roofs and bathrooms. For example, in Al-Hajarayn, the first town in the wadi, only the new mosque incorporates some concrete. The impact of newly paved roads on traditional construction is evident, with areas further from paved roads maintaining more traditional building practices.

== Modern history ==
On January 18, 2008, an ambush attack on Belgian tourists traveling in a convoy through the valley took place. A convoy of four jeeps carrying 15 tourists to Shibam was ambushed by gunmen in a hidden pickup truck. Two Belgian women, Claudine Van Caillie, of Bruges, 63, and Katrine Glorie, from East Flanders, 54, as well as two Yemenis, a driver and a guide, were killed; another man was also heavily wounded, several others suffered minor wounds. The tourists were repatriated to Belgium on January 19, except for the injured man, who remained in Sana'a.

In the wake of the attack, Belgian Minister of Foreign Affairs, Karel De Gucht originally rejected that Al-Qaeda might be responsible, explaining that although the possibility could not be ruled out, internecine disputes and latent Islamism were also to be taken into account. A number of arrests were made on January 21.

== Gallery ==
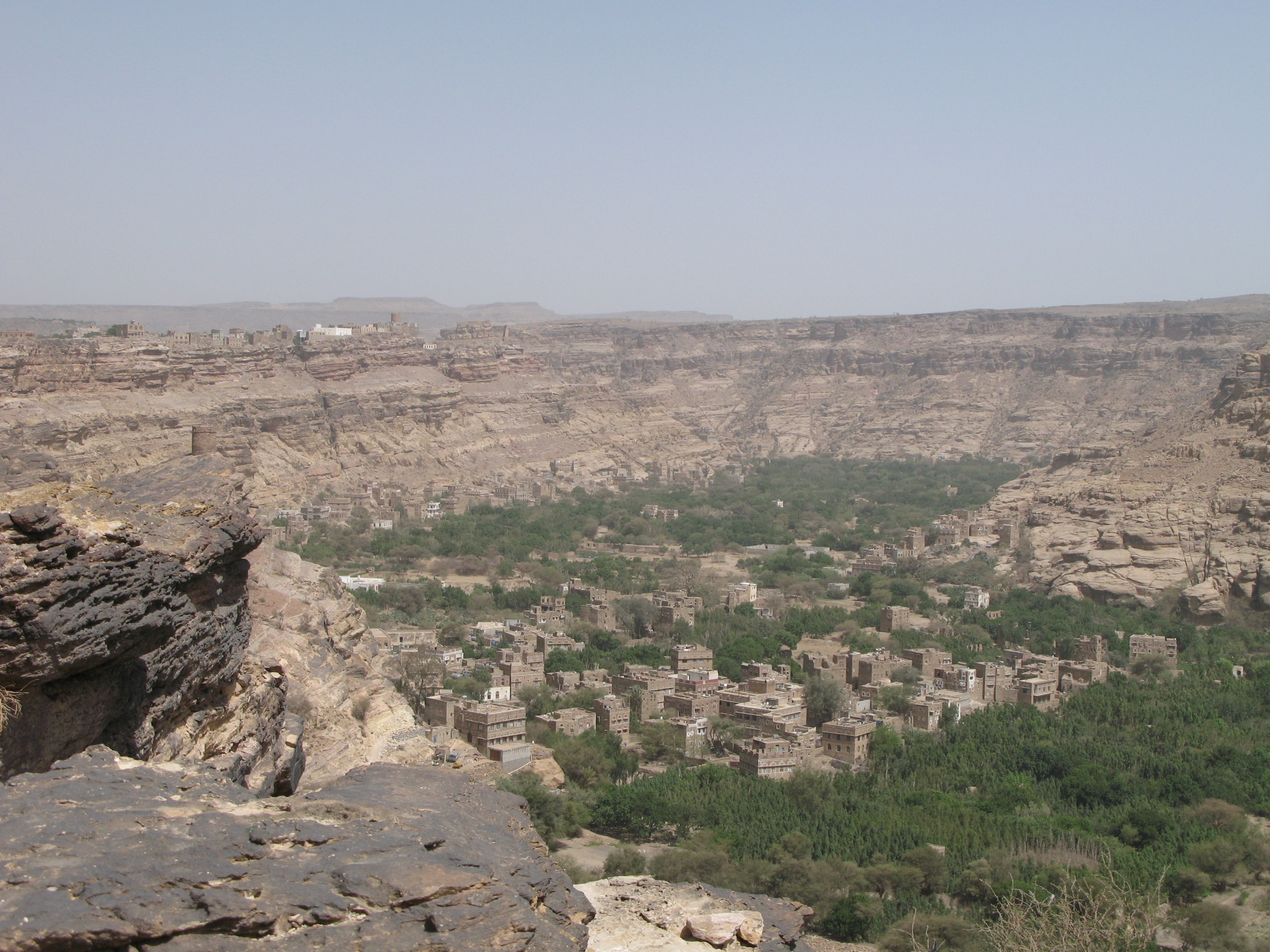

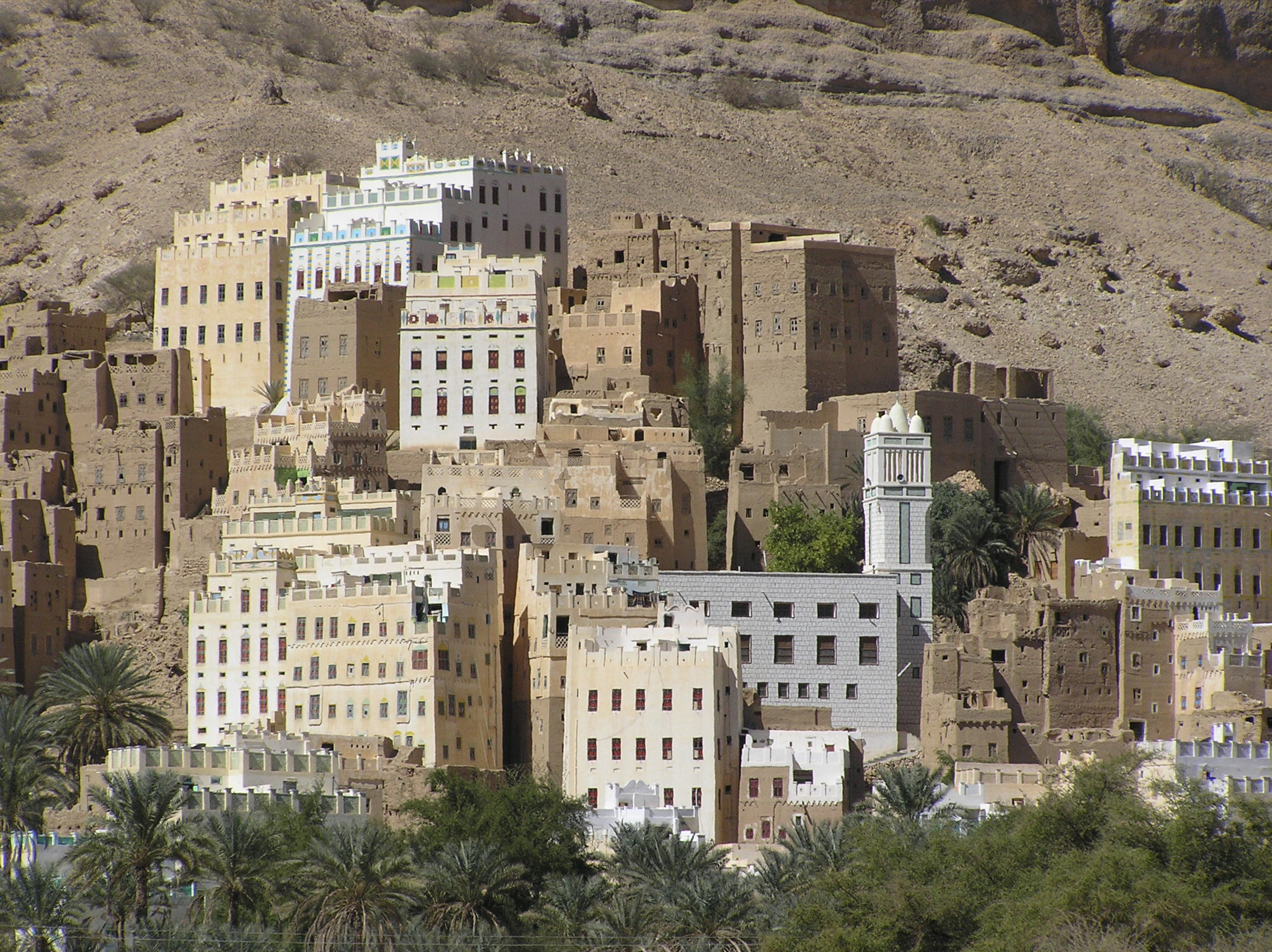

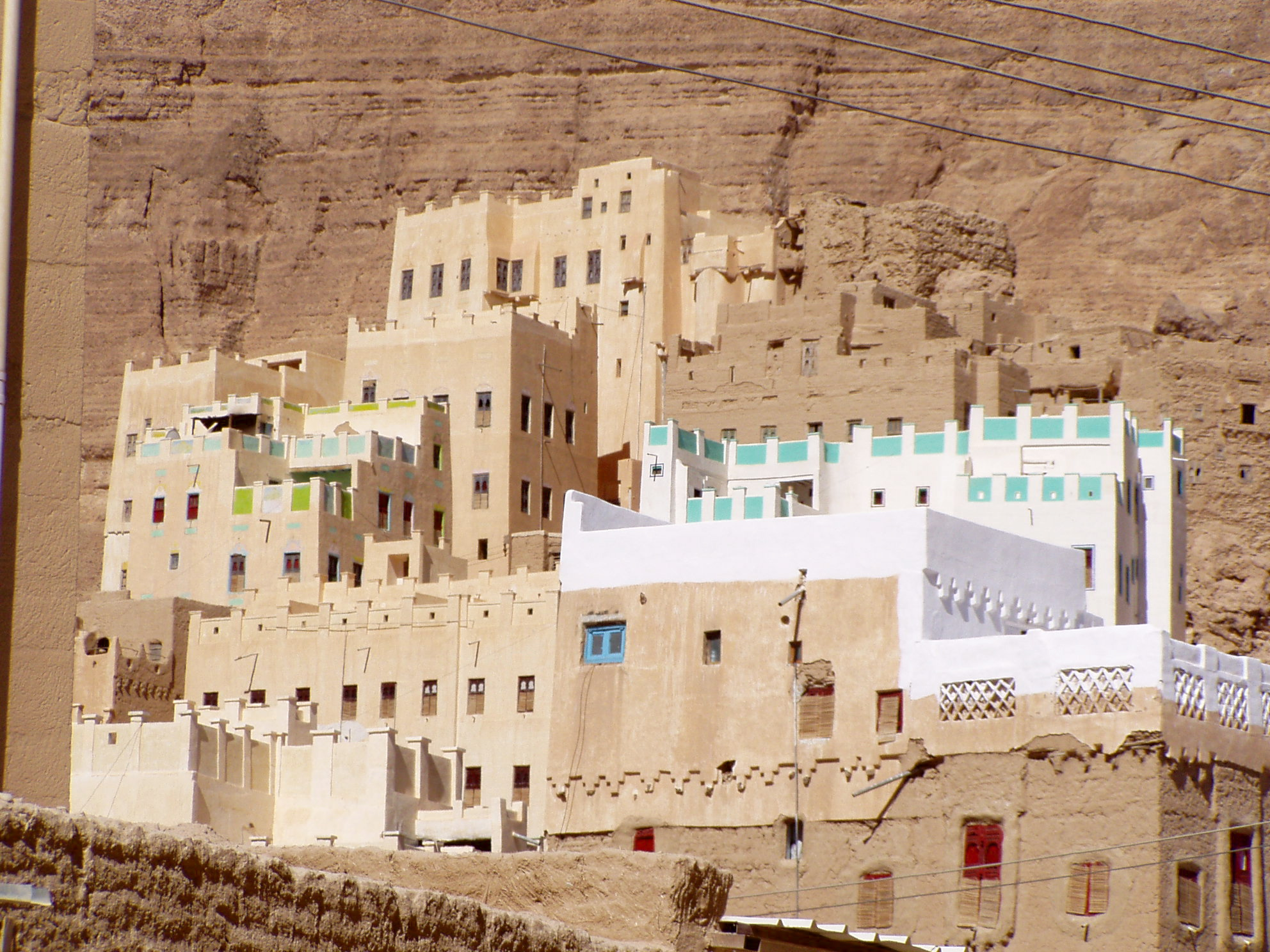

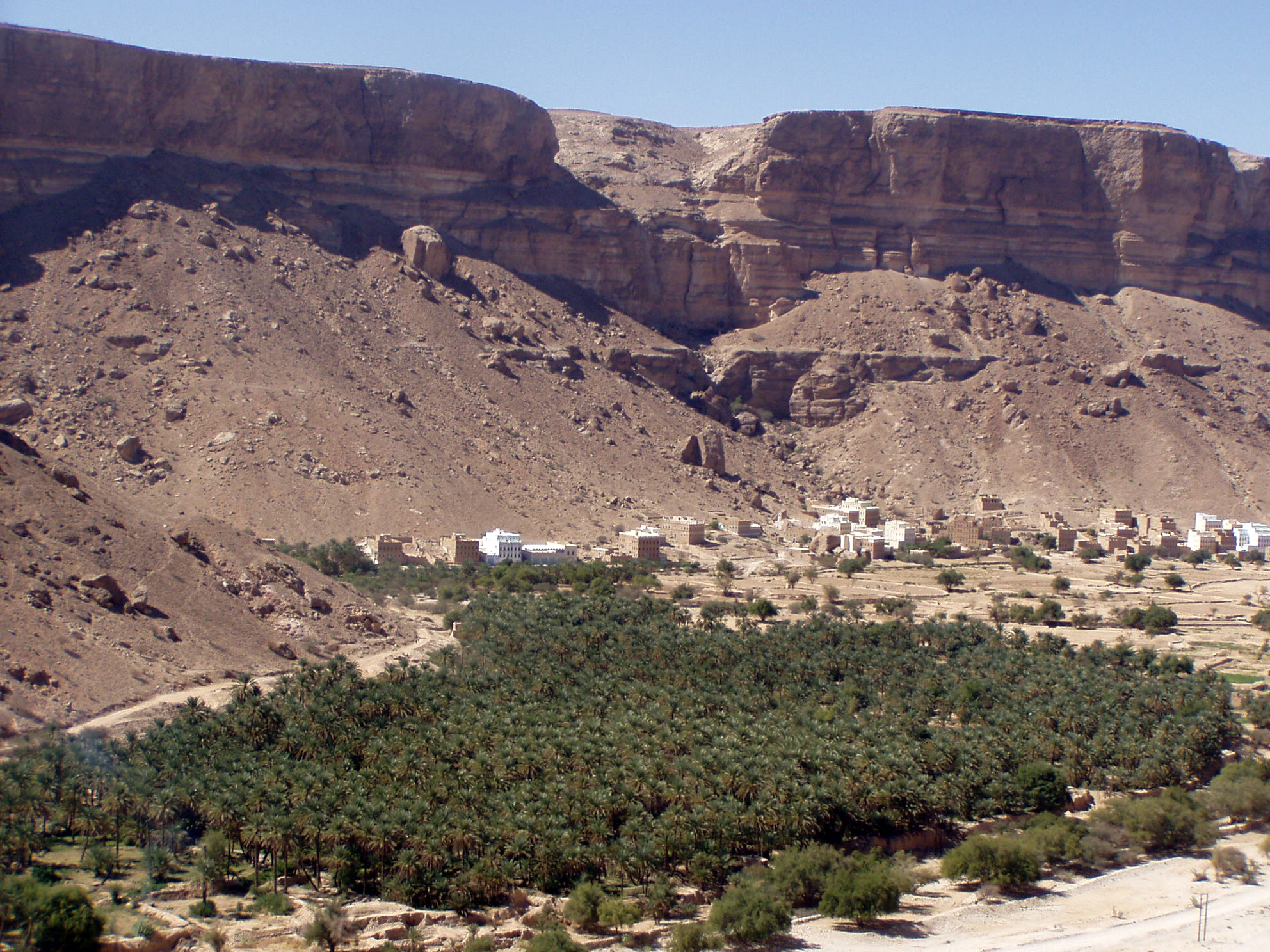

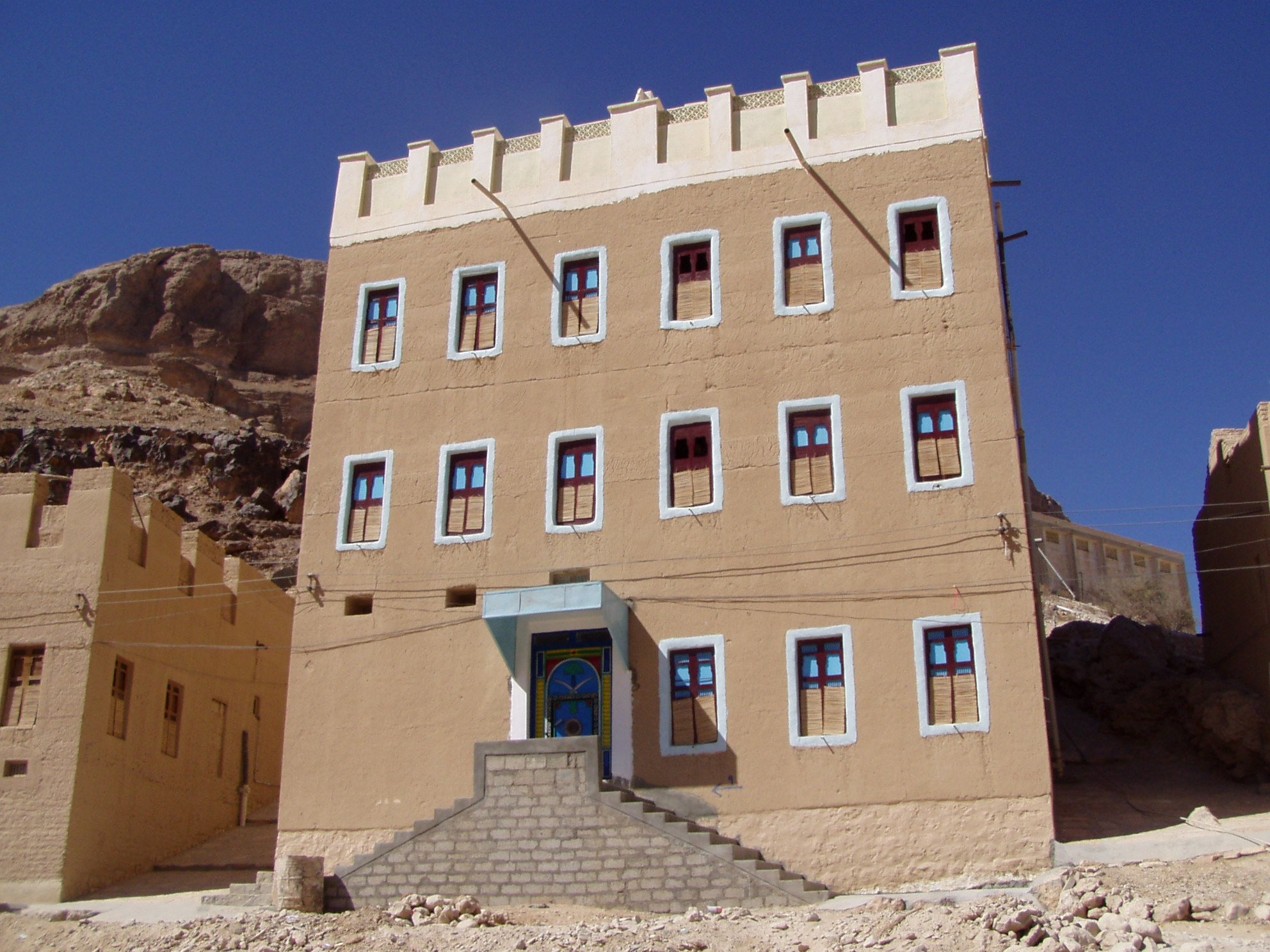

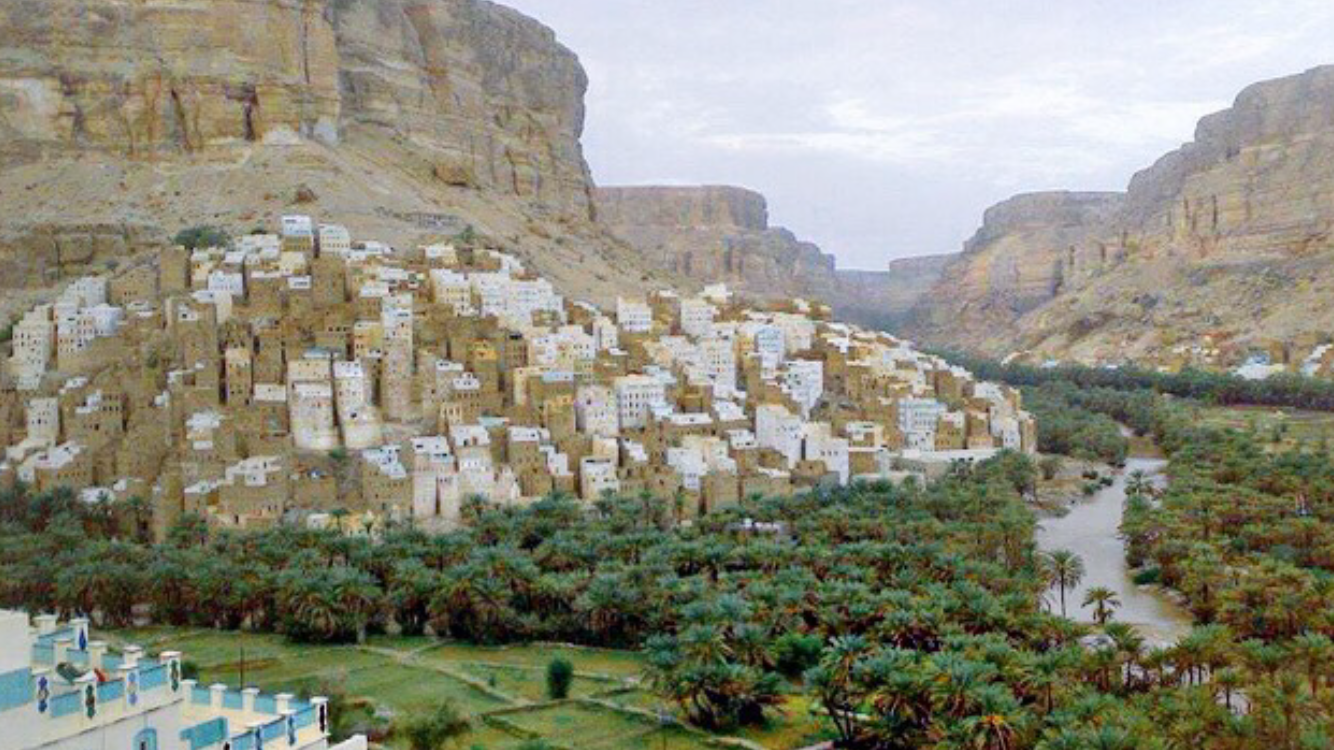

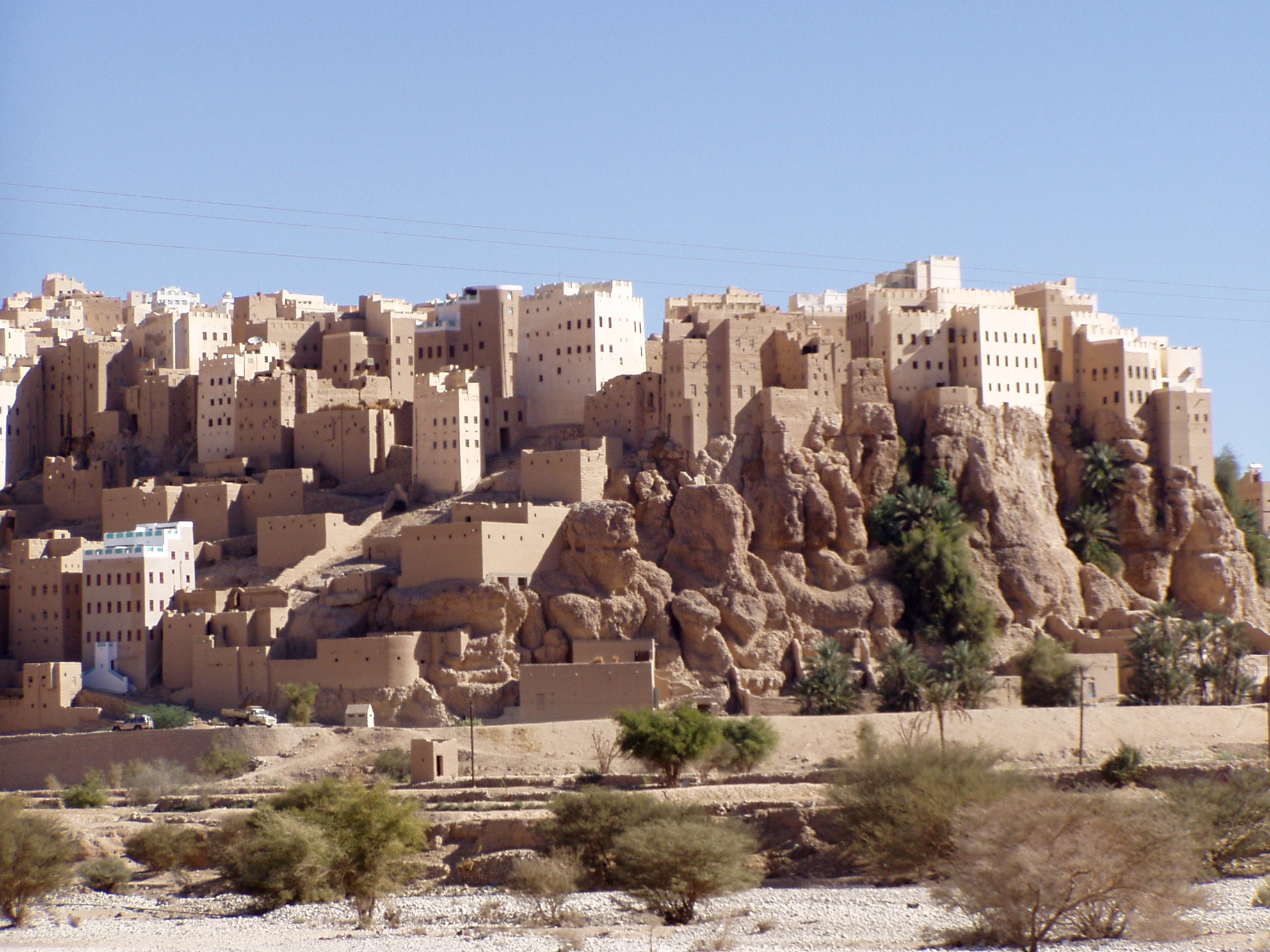

== See also ==
- Hadhramaut Mountains
- List of wadis of Yemen
