= Al-Hajarayn =

Coordinates: 15°29′N 48°20′E

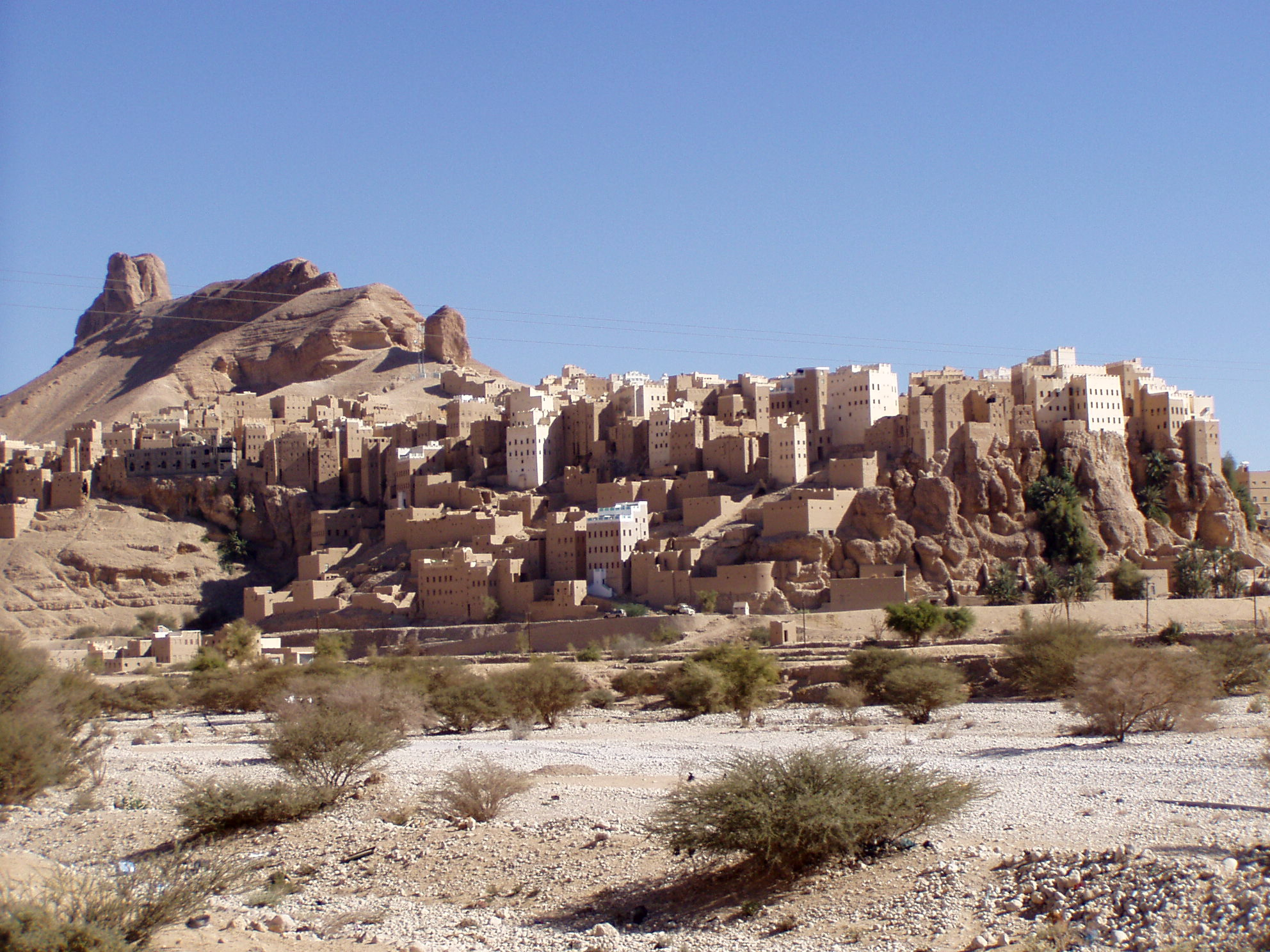
- Interactive map of Al-Hajarayn
- Country: Yemen
- Governorate: Hadhramaut
- Time zone: UTC+3 (Yemen Standard Time)

Al-Hajarayn or Hagarein is a village in east-central Yemen. It is located on the Wadi Kasr, in the lower part of the Wadi Duan.

== History ==
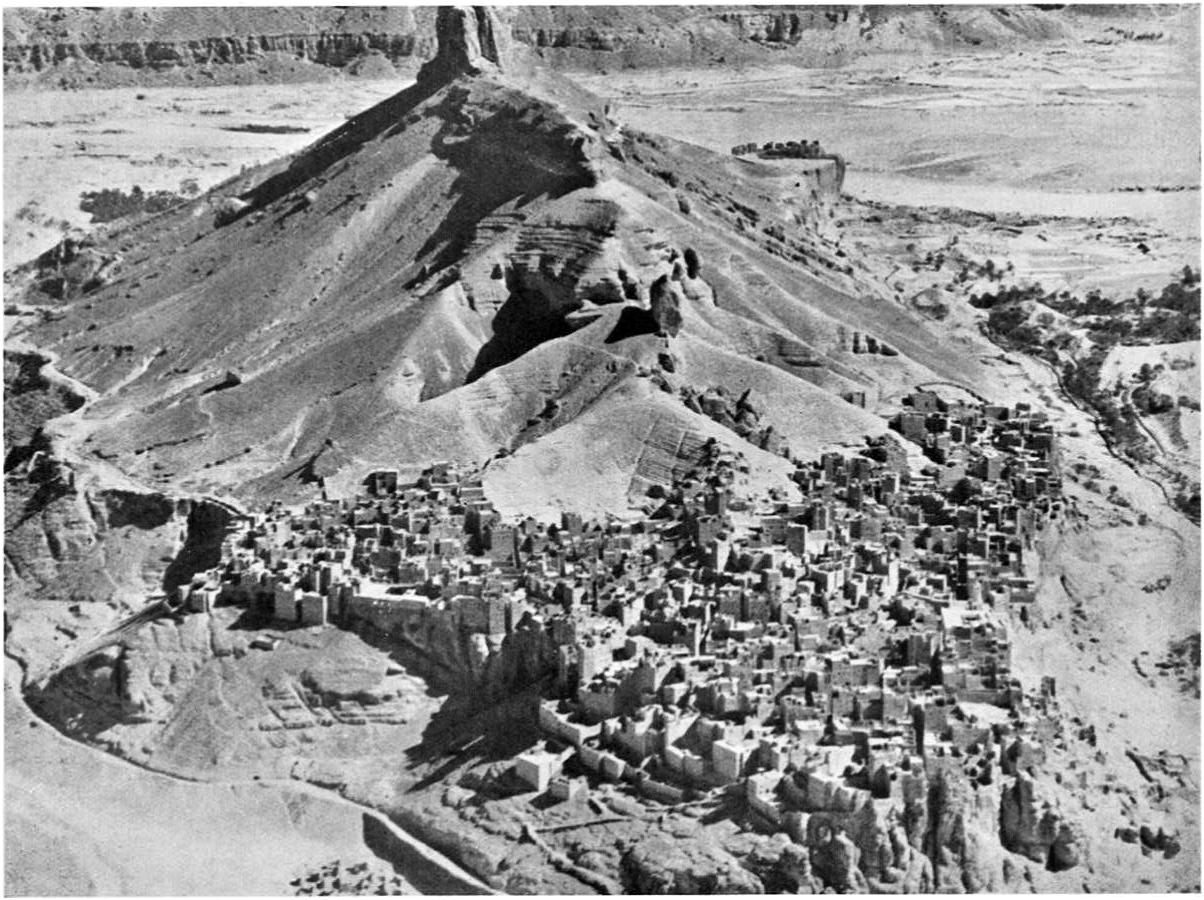
Al-Hajarayn in 1929

In the 1890s, Theodore Bent and his wife, Mabel Bent, visited Al-Hajarayn. At the time, it was ruled by Sultan Abdul M'Barrek Hamout al Kaiti. Bent stated that although the Sultan was "not entirely under Makalla [Qu'aiti]" despite being under their influence. By 1901, Al-Hajarayn had fallen under Qu'aiti rule alongside the rest of Wadi Duan.

== Gallery ==
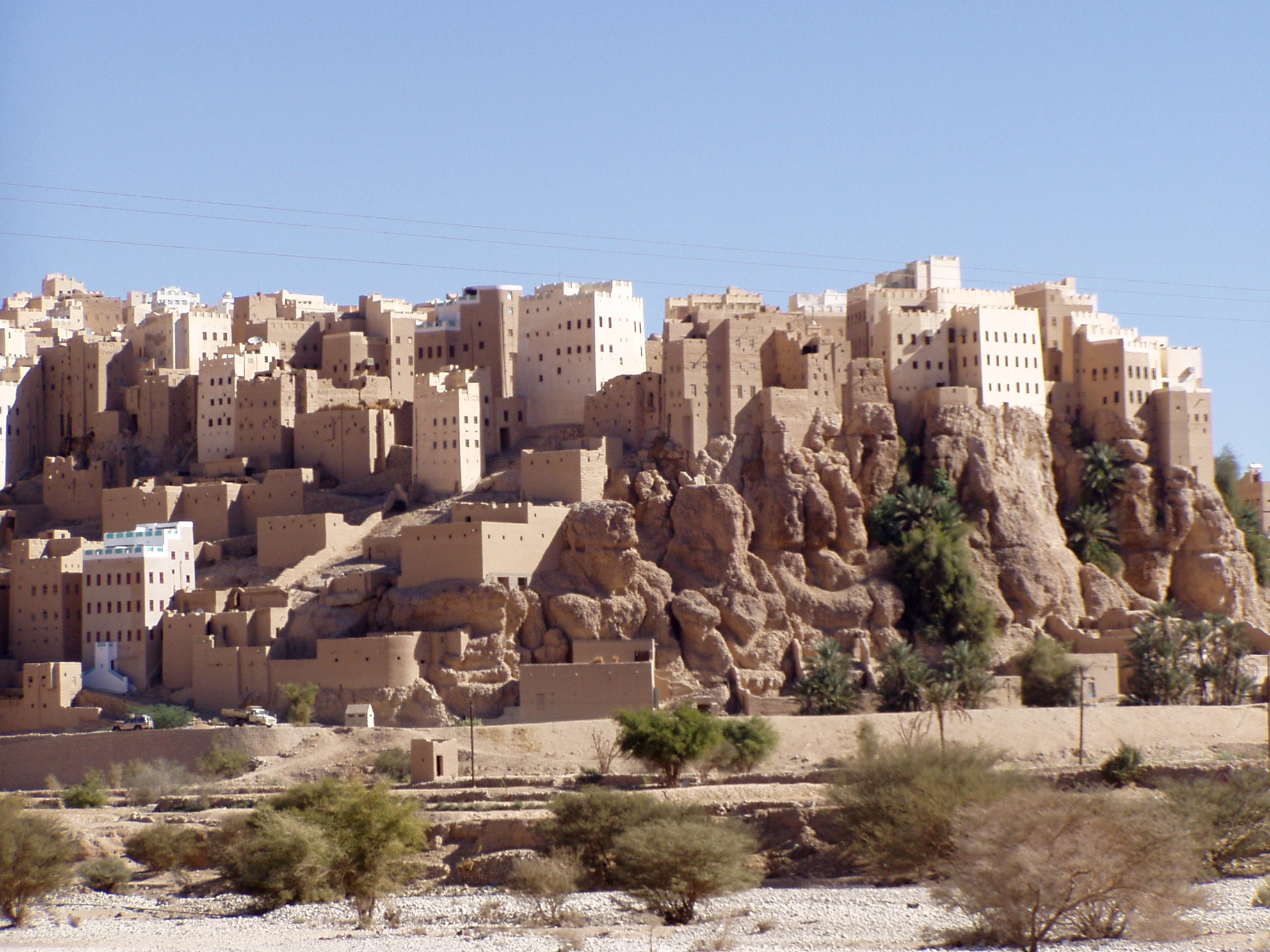

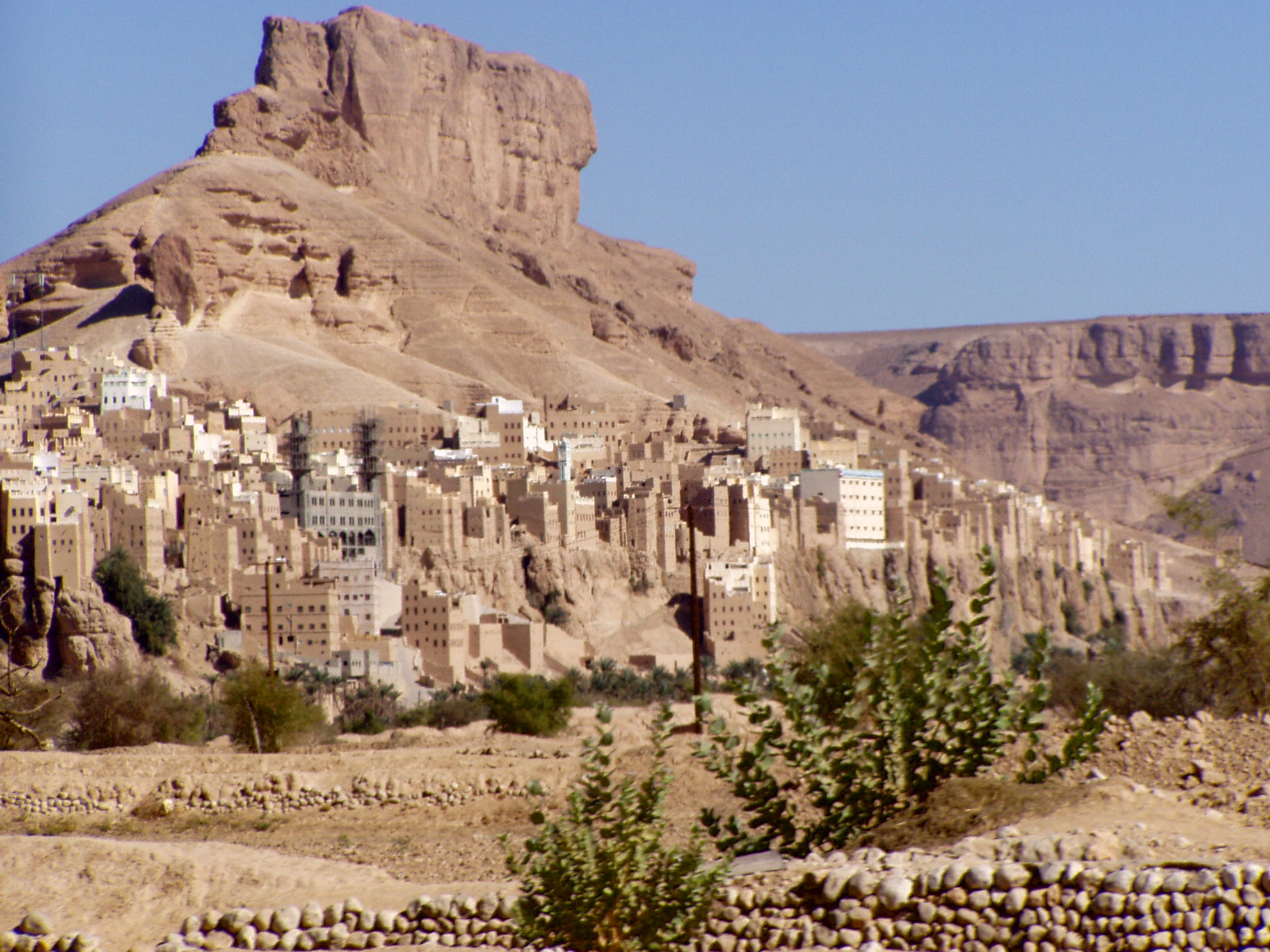

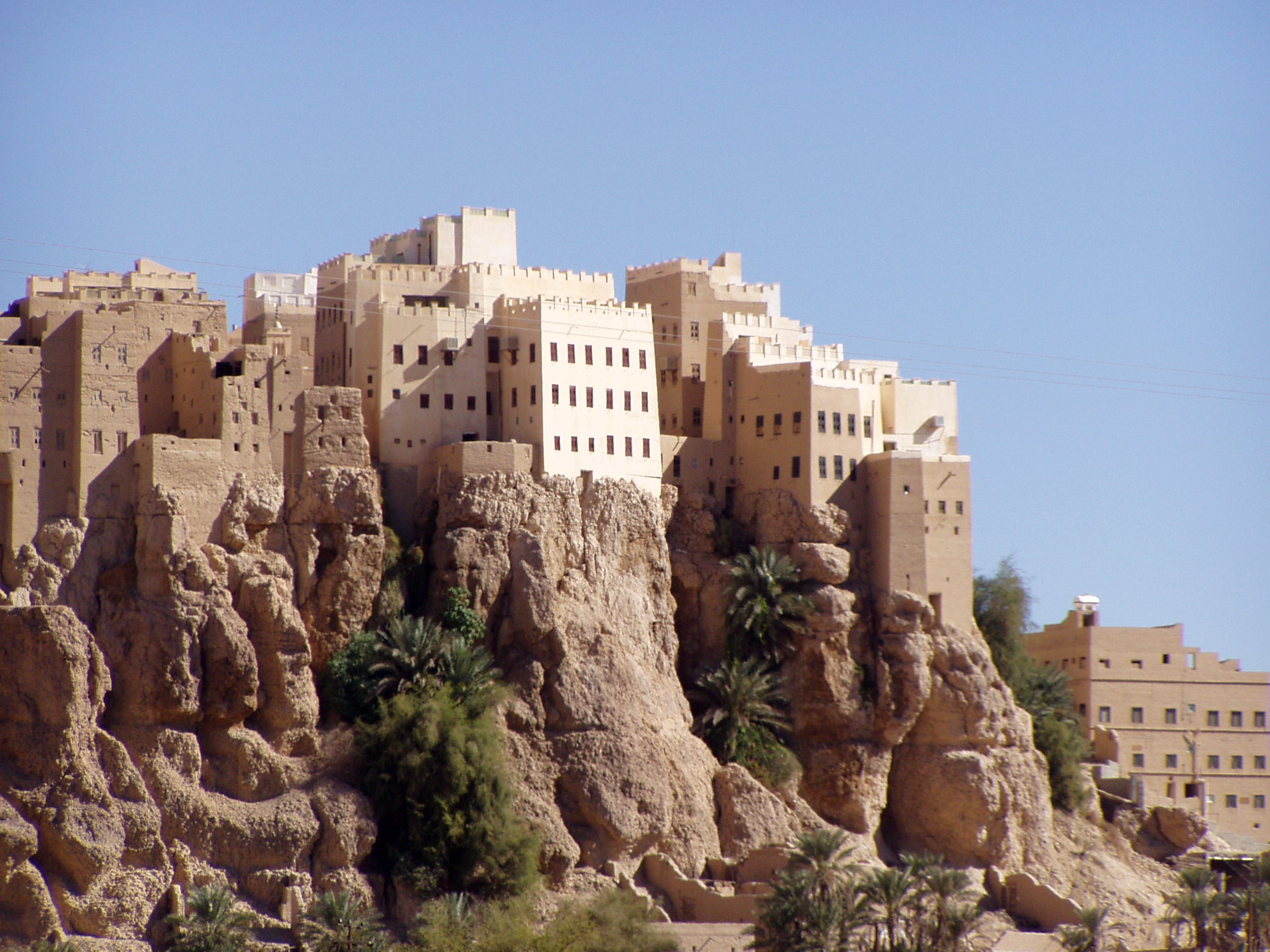
