= Qaydun =

Coordinates: 15°19′N 48°19′E

- Interactive map of Qaydun
- Country: Yemen
- Governorate: Hadhramaut Governorate
- Time zone: UTC+3 (Yemen Standard Time)

Qaydun is a village in eastern Yemen. It is located in the Hadhramaut Governorate.
