= Budah =

Coordinates: 15°13′N 48°19′E

- Interactive map of Budah
- Country: Yemen
- Governorate: Hadhramaut
- Time zone: UTC+3 (Yemen Standard Time)

Budah is a village in eastern Yemen. It is located in the Hadhramaut Governorate.
