= List of wars involving England =

This is a list of wars involving the Kingdom of England before the creation of the Kingdom of Great Britain by the Acts of Union 1707. For dates after 1707, see List of wars involving the United Kingdom. For Scotland, see list of wars involving Scotland

English victory
English defeat
Another result *

*e.g. a treaty or peace without a clear result, status quo ante bellum, result of civil or internal conflict, result unknown or indecisive, inconclusive

== Pre-unification ==
Start	End	Name of conflict	Belligerents		Outcome
Start	End	Name of conflict	Anglo-Saxons & allies	Anglo-Saxons' opposition	Outcome
455	455	Battle of Aylesford	Anglo-Saxons	Britons	Unclear
early 500s	early 500s	Battle of Argoed Llwyfain	Bernicia	Rheged	Defeat
518	518	Battle of Badon	Anglo-Saxons	Britons	Defeat
556	556	Battle of Beran Byrig	Wessex	Britons	Victory
c. 570 or c. 600	c. 570 or c. 600	Battle of Catraeth	Rheged	Gododdin	Victory
571	571	Battle of Bedcanford	Wessex	Britons	Victory
577	577	Battle of Deorham	Wessex	Britons	Victory
592	592	Battle of Woden's Barrow	Wessex	Britons	Defeat
596	596	Battle of Raith	Angles	Gaels; Picts; Britons	Victory
603	603	Battle of Degsastan	Bernicia	Dál Riata	Victory
633 or 644	633 or 644	Battle of Heavenfield	Northumbria	Gwynedd	Victory
660	660	Battle of Peonnum	Wessex	Britons	Victory
671	671	Battle of Two Rivers	Northumbria	Picts	Victory
685	685	Battle of Dun Nechtain	Northumbria	Picts	Defeat
721-722	721-722	Battle of Hehil	Wessex	Cornish	Defeat
760	760	Battle of Hereford	Mercia	Britons	Defeat
838	838	Battle of Hingston Down	Wessex	Cornish; Vikings	Victory
851	851	Battle of Aclea	Wessex	Vikings	Victory
851	851	Battle of Sandwich	Kent	Vikings	Victory
865	878	Great Heathen Army's invasion of England: Battle of York; Battle of Englefield; Battle of Reading; Battle of Ashdown; Battle of Basing; Battle of Meretun; Battle of Ashdown; Battle of Cynwit; Battle of Edington	Wessex; Northumbria; Mercia; East Anglia; Northumbria	Vikings	Victory: Treaty of Alfred and Guthrum; Creation of the Danelaw; Viking invasion defeated and halted
881	881	Battle of the Conwy	Mercia	Gwynedd	Defeat
885	885	Battle of Rochester	Wessex	Vikings	Victory
892	892	Battle of Farnham	Wessex	Vikings	Victory
893	893	Battle of Buttington	Mercia; Wessex; Welsh	Vikings	Victory
894	894	Battle of Benfleet	Wessex; Mercia	Vikings	Victory
894	894	First Battle of Stamford	Wessex	Danelaw	Defeat
910	910	Battle of Tettenhall	Mercia; Wessex	Danelaw	Victory
917	917	Battle of Tempsford	Wessex	Danelaw	Victory
917	917	Battle of Derby	Mercia	Danelaw	Victory
918	918	Second Battle of Stamford	Wessex	Danelaw	Victory

== 10th and 11th centuries ==
Start	End	Name of conflict	Belligerents		Outcome
Start	End	Name of conflict	England & allies	England's opposition	Outcome
934	934	Æthelstan's invasion of Scotland	England Deheubarth; Gwynedd; Kingdom of Gwent; Brycheiniog	Scotland	Partial victory: Militarily inconclusive; Constantine acknowledges Æthelstan's overlordship
937	937	Battle of Brunanburh	England	Kingdom of Dublin Kingdom of Alba Kingdom of Strathclyde	Victory
942	942	Idwal Foel’s war against England	England	Gwynedd	Victory: Idwal Foel is defeated and killed in battle against the Saxons
945	945	Invasion of Strathclyde	England	Kingdom of Strathclyde	Victory: Strathclyde ravaged; Strathclyde ceded to Scotland
946	954	Northumbria's war of independence	England Earl of Bamburgh	Northumbria	Victory: Northumbria becomes absorbed by the Kingdom of England
967	967	Invasion of Gwynedd	England	Gwynedd	Victory: Gwynedd is invaded and ravaged
991	991	Battle of Maldon	England	Vikings	Defeat: King Æthelred makes a payment of Danegeld of 10,000 Roman pounds
1001	1001	First Battle of Alton	England	Vikings	Defeat: The Anglo-Saxons retreats to Winchester
1001	1001	Battle of Pinhoe	England	Vikings	Defeat: The Vikings burn Pinhoe to the ground
1004	1004	Battle of Thetford	England	Vikings	Victory: The Vikings are repulsed
1006	1006	Siege of Durham (1006)	England	Scotland	Victory
1010	1010	Battle of Ringmere	England	Vikings	Defeat: Over a three-month period the Vikings wasted East Anglia, burning Thetford and Cambridge
1011 or 1012	1011 or 1012	Battle of Newmouth (at Sudbourne)	England	Vikings	Victory
1013	1013	Sweyn Forkbeard’s invasion of England	England	Kingdom of Denmark	Defeat: Sweyn Forkbeard becomes king of England and dies shortly after
1016	1016	Cnut the Great's invasion of England	England Edmund II (surrendered); Eadnoth the Younger †; Ulfcytel Snillingr †	Kingdom of Denmark Cnut the Great	Defeat: King Edmund, cedes all of England, save Wessex, to Cnut.; Following Edmund's death on 30 November, Cnut ascends to the throne as the sole king of England.; Personal union formed between Denmark and England under Danish hegemony.
1018	1018	Battle of Carham	England	Scotland Kingdom of Strathclyde	Defeat
1026	1026	Battle of Helgeå	England Canute the Great	Sweden; Norway Anund Jacob Olaf II of Norway	Victory: The Swedish and Norwegian attack to conquer Denmark while Canute is busy in England fails and Canute retains power; Olaf II of Norway loses support in Norway; Most of the Swedish forces, however, remain intact. The later invasion of Sweden seems to have ended badly, and in Anglo-Saxon sources the battle is described as a Swedish victory, and also that there was a great loss of English lives, and that the Swedes were in possession of the battlefield.; Sweden would continue to support Norwegian rebels loyal to Olaf II under the whole of Canute's reign. Most forces in the Battle of Stiklestad consisted of Swedes and the eventual Swedish support for Norwegian rebels would lead to the disintegration of the North Sea Empire and the Personal Union between Denmark and Norway.
1028	1029	Cnut’s invasion of Norway	England Kingdom of Denmark Norwegian chieftains	Kingdom of Norway	Victory: Norway conquered by Cnut
1031	1031	Cnut’s expedition to Scotland	England Kingdom of Denmark	Scotland	Victory: Malcolm II, Maelbaethe and Lehmarc subjugated
1039	1039	Battle of Rhyd Y Groes	England	Gwynedd	Defeat
1040	1040	Siege of Durham (1040)	England	Scotland	Victory
1049	1049	Blockade of Flanders	England Kingdom of Denmark	County of Flanders	Victory: Successful blockade of Flanders in support of Henry III, Holy Roman Emperor
1052	1052	Battle of Llanllieni	England	Gwynedd	Defeat
1054	1054	Battle of Dunsinane	England	Scotland	Victory
1062	1063	Campaign against Gruffudd ap Llywelyn	England	Gwynedd	Victory: Gruffudd ap Llywelyn is defeated and dies
1064	1066	Breton-Norman War	England Duchy of Normandy	Duchy of Brittany	Victory: Norman victory
1066	1066	Norwegian invasion of England	England Harold Godwinson; Morcar, Earl of Northumbria; Edwin, Earl of Mercia	Kingdom of Norway Harald Hardrada † Tostig Godwinson † Eystein Orre †	Victory: English Victory; The Norse army is defeated
1066	1071	Norman Conquest of England	England Harold Godwinson †; Gyrth Godwinson †; Leofwine Godwinson †	Duchy of Normandy William of Normandy; Alan the Red; William FitzOsbern; Eustace II, Count of Boulogne	Defeat: Norman Victory; England becomes absorbed by the Duchy of Normandy
1067	1165	Norman invasion of Wales	England	Welsh kingdoms Kingdom of Norway	Indecisive: Establishment of the Welsh Marches and conquest of Welsh territory; Failure to conquer all of wales
1072	1072	Norman invasion of Scotland	England	Scotland	Victory: Scottish attacks on Northumbria repelled; Malcolm III forced to submit to William the Conqueror, though makes subsequent raids once the Norman king returns south
1076	1077	The Breton War	England; Duchy of Normandy	Duchy of Brittany; France	Defeat: Philip I of France prevents further Norman expansion into the region
1087	1087	The Vexin War	England; Duchy of Normandy	France	Defeat: Failure to conquer the 'French Vexin'; William I mortally wounded
1090	1090	Rouen Riot	England; Pilatenses (anti-ducal citizens)	Duchy of Normandy; Pro ducal Calloenses	Defeat: Victory of ducal faction
1091	1091	Invasion of Normandy (1091)	England	Duchy of Normandy	Victory: Treaty of Caen
1092	1092	Invasion of Cumbria	England	Scotland	Victory
1093	1093	Battle of Alnwick	England	Scotland	Victory
1096	1099	First Crusade	England Holy Roman Empire; Kingdom of France; Duchy of Apulia; Byzantine Empire; Armenian Kingdom of Cilicia	Great Seljuq Empire Danishmends; Fatimid Caliphate; Almoravids	Victory: Recapture of Nicaea; Formation of the Crusader States
1097	1098	The Second Vexin War	England; Duchy of Normandy	France	Inconclusive Truce: Mixed Results; Status Quo Ante Bellum in Vexin; Failure to conquer French Vexin; Northern Maine Annexed

== 12th century ==
Start	End	Name of conflict	Belligerents		Outcome
Start	End	Name of conflict	England & allies	England's opposition	Outcome
1105	1106	Invasion of Normandy (1105-1106)	England	Duchy of Normandy	Victory: Normandy is conquered by England after the Battle of Tinchebray
1109	1113	Anglo-French war 1109-1113	England Duchy of Normandy	France	Victory: Henry I retains Gisors; Henry I recognised as suzerain of Brittany and Maine
1116	1119	Anglo-French war 1116-1119	England; Duchy of Normandy	France Norman Rebels	Victory: Louis VI fails to annex the Duchy of Normandy; Victory at the Battle of Brémule swiftly ends the war
1123	1135	Anglo-French war 1123-1135	England Duchy of Normandy	France County of Maine	Victory: French-Supported rebels in Maine defeated
1130	1134	David I's second war against Máel Coluim mac Alaxandair	England; Scotland	Scottish Rebels	Victory: Rebels Defeated; Máel Coluim was captured and imprisoned in Roxburgh Castle
1136	1139	Anglo-Scottish war 1136-1139	England	Scotland	Defeat: Treaty of Durham (1139); David's son Henry is given the earldom of Northumberland; Stephen recognises the independence of Scotland
1142	1142	Siege of Lisbon (1142)	(Kingdom of England) Anglo-Norman Crusaders; Kingdom of Portugal	Taifa of Badajoz	Defeat: Crusader forces fail to capture Lisbon
1145	1149	Second Crusade	England (Holy land Crusade) Kingdom of Jerusalem (Holy land Crusade); Kingdom of France (Iberian and Holy Land Crusade); Holy Roman Empire (Wendish and Holy Land Crusade); Kingdom of Portugal (Iberian Crusade); Castile (Iberian Crusade); County of Barcelona (Iberian Crusade); León (Iberian Crusade); Byzantine Empire (Holy land Crusade); Kingdom of Denmark (Wendish Crusade); Duchy of Poland (Wendish Crusade); Kingdom of Sicily (Holy land Crusade)	Sultanate of Rum (Holy Land Crusade) Almoravids (Iberian Crusade); Almohads (Iberian Crusade); Zengids (Holy Land Crusade); Fatimids (Holy Land Crusade); Obotrite Confederacy (Wendish Crusade)	Partial Crusader Victory: Crusader Victory in Iberian and Wendish Crusades; Muslim Victory in the Holy Land Crusade
1150s	1150s	Eystein II expedition to England	England	(Kingdom of Norway (872–1397)) Norway	Defeat: Eastern English coast plundered
1158	1189	Anglo-French War 1158–1189: Revolt of 1173-74	England	France Angevins Supporting Prince Richard	English Defeat: Revolt of 1173-74 is defeated; Richard’s Revolt is successful in 1189 with French aid
1166	1169	Invasion of Brittany	England	Duchy of Brittany	Victory: Brittany is absorbed into the Angevin Empire
1169	1177	Anglo-Norman invasion of Ireland	England Anglo-Normans Cambro-Normans	Gaelic Ireland	Victory: Most of Ireland absorbed into the Lordship of Ireland
1185	1185	John's first expedition to Ireland	England: Lordship of Ireland	Lordship of Meath; Gaelic Ireland	Defeat: John returns to England.; Hugh de Lacy falls out of royal favour.
1189	1192	Third Crusade: Conquest of Cyprus by Richard I	England Kingdom of Jerusalem; France; Holy Roman Empire; Kingdom of Hungary	Ayyubids Zengids; Sultanate of Rum; Byzantine Empire; Kingdom of Sicily	Partial Crusader victory: Treaty of Ramla
1193	1199	Anglo-French War 1193–1199	England	France	Victory: Truce at Vernon; Successful defence of Angevin territories
1196	1196	Battle of Radnor	England	Deheubarth	Defeat
1198	1198	Siege and Battle of Painscastle	England	Powys Wenwynwyn	Victory

== 13th century ==
Start	End	Name of conflict	Belligerents		Outcome
Start	End	Name of conflict	England & allies	England's opposition	Outcome
1202	1204	French invasion of Normandy (1202–1204): Battle of Mirebeau; Siege of Château Gaillard	England	France	Defeat: England loses Normandy, Maine and Anjou to France
1205	1207 or 1208	Anglo-Castilian War	England	Castile	Victory: Alfonso VIII of Castile fails to conquer the Duchy of Gascony, giving up on the venture in 1207 or 1208
1209	1229	Albigensian Crusade	(Kingdom of England) English volunteers: Kingdom of France; Duchy of Burgundy; Duchy of Brittany; County of Nevers; County of Auxerre; County of Saint-Pol; Viscounty of Donges; Viscounty of Torèna; Papal States; Episcopal Inquisition; Dominican Order; Militia of the Faith of Jesus Christ; Hospitallers of the Holy Spirit; Knights of Saint George; Duchy of Austria; Duchy of Berg; Electorate of Cologne; County of Aurenja: County of Provence-Forcalquier	Cathars; County of Toulouse; Viscounty of Béziers and Albi; County of Valentinois; Lordship of Séverac; Marquisate of Provence; Viscounty of Béarn; County of Astarac; Crown of Aragon; County of Foix; County of Comminges; Viscounty of Carcassonne; Lordship of Menèrba; Lordship of Tèrmes; Lordship of Cabaret; Lordship of Montsegúr; Exiled knights	Crusader Victory: Treaty of Paris
1210	1210	John's second expedition to Ireland	England: Lordship of Ireland	Earldom of Ulster; Gaelic Ireland	Victory
1211	1211	Welsh Uprising of 1211	England	Gwynedd Deheubarth	Partial Victory: Uprising defeated; Peace treaty calling for less involvement from King John in Wales; Gwynedd cedes the Perfeddwlad to England, but Gwynedd would recover the land the following year
1213	1214	Anglo-French War (1213–1214)	England; Holy Roman Empire County of Flanders; County of Boulogne	France	Defeat: Truce of Chinon; Collapse of the Angevin Empire
1224	1224	Poitou War	England	France	Defeat: French Victory; La Rochelle absorbed into Capetian royal demesne
1225	1226	English reclamation of Gascony	England	France	Victory: England regains control of Gascony; Gascony remains a Plantagenet possession until the end of the Hundred Years’ War
1230	1230	English invasion of France (1230)	England	France	Defeat: English Withdrawal
1234	1234	Breton Conflict (1234)	England Duchy of Brittany	France	Defeat: England loses Brittany as a vassal
1239	1241	Barons' Crusade	England France; Kingdom of Navarre; Kingdom of Jerusalem	Ayyubids	Crusader Diplomatic Victory: Christians negotiated return of Jerusalem, Ascalon, Sidon, Tiberias, most of Galilee, Bethlehem, and Nazareth; Kingdom of Jerusalem returned to largest size since 1187
1242	1243	Saintonge War	England	France	Defeat
1243	1244	Anglo-Navarrese War	England	Kingdom of Navarre	Victory: Anglo-Gascon forces secure control of the disputed territories and force a resolution, supposedly capturing Theobald I of Navarre in the process
1271	1272	Ninth Crusade	England Kingdom of Cyprus; Kingdom of Jerusalem; County of Tripoli; Ilkhanate; Armenian Cilicia	Mamluks	Stalemate: Status quo ante bellum
1277	1283	Conquest of Wales by Edward I of England	England	Principality of Wales	English victory
1290	1290	Seizure of the Isle of Man	England	Kingdom of Scotland	Victory: The Isle of Man comes under English rule
1292	1350	War of the Strait: Battle of Río Salado; Siege of Algeciras (1342–1344)	Crown of Aragon; Kingdom of Castile; Kingdom of Portugal Kingdom of Navarre; Kingdom of France; Kingdom of England; Republic of Genoa	Marinid Sultanate; Emirate of Granada	Victory: End of Moroccan hegemony in the Strait of Gibraltar. No more offensive or expansion attempts against the Christian Kingdoms would be done by Marinids, being just at the defensive for the rest of the reconquista.
1294	1303	Gascon War: Battle of Bonnegarde	Kingdom of England	France	Defeat: Treaty of Paris; Aquitaine becomes a Fief of France
1296	1328	First War of Scottish Independence	Kingdom of England	Kingdom of Scotland Connacht; Thomond; Uí Maine; Tyrconnell; Breifne O'Rourke; Oriel; Desmond; Magh Luirg	Inconclusive (Treaty of Edinburgh–Northampton): Scottish independence from England maintained; English victory in Ireland; Reinstatement of Anglo-Scottish border from reign of Alexander III of Scotland

== 14th century ==
Start	End	Name of conflict	Belligerents		Outcome
Start	End	Name of conflict	England & allies	England's opposition	Outcome
1324	1324	War of Saint-Sardos	Kingdom of England	Kingdom of France	Defeat
1332	1357	Second War of Scottish Independence	Kingdom of England	Kingdom of Scotland	Defeat: Treaty of Berwick
1337	1453	Hundred Years' War	Kingdom of England Duchy of Burgundy; Duchy of Brittany (Montfort); Portugal; Navarre; Flanders; Hainaut; Luxembourg; Holy Roman Empire	Kingdom of France Castile; Kingdom of Scotland; Genoa; Majorca; Bohemia; Crown of Aragon; Brittany (Blois)	Defeat: Overall French Victory: Edwardian War - English Victory; Caroline War - French Victory; Lancastrian War - French Victory
1350	1359	First Hook and Cod War	Hook Alliance; Kingdom of England	Cod alliance	Defeat
1351	1369	Castilian Civil War	Kingdom of England Forces of Peter of Castile; Kingdom of Navarre; Kingdom of Majorca; Kingdom of Granada; Duchy of Aquitaine Other Elite European mercenaries	Forces of Henry of Trastámara; Kingdom of France; Crown of Aragon	Withdrawal: English forces withdraw from the conflict in 1367 as it became clear Peter of Castile would not honour the terms of the Treaty of Libourne; Eventual Victory for Henry of Trastámara and his allies.
1377	1575	Anglo-Scottish Wars	Kingdom of England	Kingdom of Scotland	Stalemate: Scotland maintains its independence from England.; England captures Berwick-upon-Tweed from Scotland in 1482.; Both kingdoms are joined in a personal union following 1603.
1381	1382	Third Fernandine War	Kingdom of England Portugal	Castile	Defeat: Treaty of Elvas; 1383–85 Crisis
1383	1385	1383–85 Crisis	Kingdom of England Portugal	Crown of Castile; Kingdom of France; Crown of Aragon	Victory: John of Avis becomes John I of Portugal, ushering in the Johanine Dynasty; Consolidation of Portuguese independence from Castile.; Signing of the Treaty of Windsor, strengthening the Anglo-Portuguese Alliance and kickstarting the so-called "Illustrious Generation"
1386	1388	Invasion of Castile by John of Gaunt	Supportes of John of Gaunt: Kingdom of Galicia; Kingdom of Portugal; Kingdom of England	Crown of Castile: French mercenaries	Defeat
1394	1395	Richard II’s invasion of Ireland	Kingdom of England	Gaelic Ireland	Victory: A number of Irish chieftains submit to English overlordship

== 15th century ==
Start	End	Name of conflict	Belligerents		Outcome
Start	End	Name of conflict	England & allies	England's opposition	Outcome
1417	1428	Second Hook and Cod War: Battle of Brouwershaven	Hook Alliance; Kingdom of England	Cod Alliance; Duchy of Burgundy	Defeat
1470	1474	Anglo-Hanseatic War	England	Hanseatic League	Defeat: Treaty of Utrecht
1487	1491	French-Breton War: Battle of Saint-Aubin-du-Cormier	Duchy of Brittany; Holy Roman Empire; Kingdom of England; Kingdom of Castile and León	Kingdom of France	Defeat, French victory
1487	1492	Second Flemish revolt against Maximilian of Austria	England Habsburg Monarchy; Habsburg Netherlands	County of Flanders	Habsburg-Allied Victory: City walls of Bruges demolished, loses economic position

== 16th century ==
Start	End	Name of conflict	Belligerents		Outcome
Start	End	Name of conflict	England & allies	England's opposition	Outcome
1512	1514	War of the League of Cambrai	England Papal States; Venice; Holy Roman Empire; Spain; Swiss mercenaries	France Duchy of Ferrara; Scotland	Defeat: French and Venetian victory; Victory over Scotland in the Battle of Flodden
1522	1525	Italian War of 1521–26	England Papal States; Holy Roman Empire Spain	France Venice	Victory
1534	1537	Kildare Rebellion	England; Lordship of Ireland	FitzGeralds of Kildare allied Irish clans	Victory: Execution of Thomas FitzGerald
1539	1539	Battle of Belahoe	England	Kingdom of Tyrone; Kingdom of Tyrconnell	Victory
1542	1546	Italian War of 1542–46	England Holy Roman Empire; Spain; Saxony; Brandenburg	France Ottoman Empire; Jülich-Cleves-Berg	Inconclusive
1543	1550	Rough Wooing	England	Scotland France	Defeat, Treaty of Norham, French-Scottish victory
1556	1559	Italian War of 1551–59: Anglo-French War (1557-1559)	England Holy Roman Empire; Spain; Duchy of Florence; Duchy of Savoy	France Republic of Siena; Ottoman Empire	Defeat: Peace of Cateau-Cambrésis; Loss of Calais to France; Spanish and Imperial victory overall
1558	1567	Shane O'Neill's rebellion	England; Kingdom of Ireland allied Irish clans	Clan O'Neill; Redshanks	Victory: Shane O'Neill is killed and his lands are forfeited to the English crown
1560	1560	Siege of Leith	England (Kingdom of Scotland) Protestant Scots	(Kingdom of France) France (Kingdom of Scotland) Catholic Scots	Inconclusive: Catholic/French withstood siege.; Mary of Guise died during the peace process.; Treaty of Edinburgh signed with withdraw of English and French troops from Scotland.; Auld Alliance between Scotland and France was dissolved.
1562	1563	English expedition to France (1562-1563)	England Huguenots (Before Edict of Amboise	France	Defeat, Treaty of Troyes (1564), Elizabeth I accepts French rule over Pale of Calais in exchange for 120,000 Crowns.
1562	1598	French Wars of Religion (1562–1598)	Protestants: Huguenots; England	Catholics: Catholic League; Spain; Duchy of Savoy	Victory: Uneasy truce; The Edict of Nantes granted the Huguenots substantial rights in certain areas; Paris and other defined territories were declared to be permanently Catholic; Failure of France's enemies to weaken France and to gain territories
1563	1563	Battle of Gibraltar (1563)	England	Spain	Defeat
1566	1648	Eighty Years' War	England Dutch Republic; France; Huguenots; German Protestants	Holy Roman Empire Spain	Victory: Peace of Münster, Netherlands becomes independent
1568	1573	Marian Civil War	England (Scotland) King's Men	(Scotland) Queen's Men	Victory: King's Men Victory
1568	1568	Battle of San Juan de Ulúa (1568)	Kingdom of England	Spain: New Spain	Defeat
1569	1573	First Desmond Rebellion	England; Kingdom of Ireland allied Irish clans	FitzGeralds of Desmond allied Irish clans	Victory: Second Desmond Rebellion
1572	1573	Francis Drake's expedition of 1572–1573	England; France; Cimarrones	Spain	Victory
1577	1580	Francis Drake's circumnavigation	England	Spain; Portugal	Victory
1579	1583	Second Desmond Rebellion	England; Kingdom of Ireland allied Irish clans	FitzGeralds of Desmond; Spain; Papal States allied Irish clans	Victory: Famine throughout Munster; Plantation of Munster
1580	1583	War of the Portuguese Succession	England Portugal loyal to Prior of Crato; France; United Provinces	Spain Portugal loyal to Philip of Spain	Defeat: Decisive Spanish victory; Philip of Spain crowned King of Portugal
1583	1583	Battle of São Vicente	England	Spain	Victory
1585	1604	Anglo-Spanish War (1585–1604)	England United Provinces; France (Portugal) Portuguese loyal to Prior of Crato; French Huguenot forces	Spain: Portugal under Philip of Spain; French Catholic League; Irish alliance (Sovereign Military Order of Malta) Order of Saint John	Stalemate: Status quo ante bellum; Treaty of London
1594	1603	Nine Years' War (Ireland)	England; Kingdom of Ireland	Alliance of Irish clans Spain; Scottish Gaelic mercenaries	Victory: Treaty of Mellifont (1603); Flight of the Earls (1607)

== 17th century ==
Start	End	Name of conflict	Belligerents		Outcome
Start	End	Name of conflict	England & allies	England's opposition	Outcome
1602	1661	Dutch-Portuguese War (1602–1661)	Dutch Republic; England (until 1640); Johor Sultanate; Kingdom of Kandy; Kingdom of Kongo; Kingdom of Ndongo	Kingdom of Portugal; Crown of Castile (until 1640); Kingdom of Cochin; Potiguara Tupis	Stalemate Treaty of Hague: Formation of the Dutch Empire; Portuguese Restoration War; Dutch victory in the East; Portuguese victory in South America and Africa
1609	1621	Dutch conquest of the Banda Islands	Bandanese fighters East India Company	Dutch East India Company	Defeat: Dutch forces colonise the Banda Islands.
1609	1701	Beaver Wars	Iroquois League; Mohawks; Oneida; Seneca; Onondaga; Cayuga; Supported by: England; Dutch Republic	Huron; Algonquin; Susquehannock; Erie; Neutral; Petun; Odawa; Ojibwe; Wenro; Mahican; Innu; Abenaki; Supported by: France	Indecisive: Great Peace of Montreal; Huron-Wendat Confederacy destroyed
1610	1614	First Anglo-Powhatan War	Colony of Virginia	Powhatan Confederacy	Victory
1612	1612	Battle of Swally	East India Company	Kingdom of Portugal	Victory
1613	1613	Raiding campaign against Acadia	England Colony of Virginia	France; New France	Victory: Towns in Acadia successfully raided; Prisoners taken
1615	1617	Uskok War	England Republic of Venice; Dutch Republic	Holy Roman Empire; Kingdom of Croatia; Spain	Victory: Many Uskok pirates executed or exiled; Austrian garrison installed to check Uskoks.
1618	1618	Sack of Santo Tomé de Guayana	England	Spain	Victory
1618	1648	Thirty Years' war	Protestant States and Allies Sweden; Kingdom of France; Bohemia; Denmark–Norway (1625–1629); Saxony; Dutch Republic; Electorate of the Palatinate; Brunswick-Lüneburg; England; Scotland; Brandenburg-Prussia; Transylvania; Hungarian Anti-Habsburg Rebels; Zaporozhian Cossacks; Ottoman Empire	Roman Catholic States and Allies Holy Roman Empire: Catholic League; Habsburg Monarchy Austria; Bavaria; Spain and its possessions Denmark–Norway (1643–1645)	Victory: Peace of Westphalia; Habsburg supremacy curtailed; Rise of the Bourbon dynasty; Rise of the Swedish Empire; Decentralization of the Holy Roman Empire; Franco-Spanish War until 1659; Substantial decline in the power and influence of the Catholic Church
1620	1621	English expedition to Algiers (1620–1621)	England	Regency of Algiers	Defeat
1621	1622	Anglo-Persian capture of Queshm	East India Company Safavid Iran	Portugal	Anglo-Persian Victory: Qeshm annexed to Persia
1622	1622	Anglo-Persian capture of Hormuz	East India Company Safavid Iran	Portugal	Anglo-Persian Victory: Hormuz annexed to Persia
1622	1632	Second Anglo-Powhatan War	Colony of Virginia	Powhatan Confederacy	Victory
1625	1630	Anglo-Spanish War (1625–1630)	England Support: United Provinces	Spain	Status quo ante bellum: Spain seeks and signs peace treaty with England in light of imminent war with France; Treaty of Madrid, similar to previous Anglo-Spanish treaty although somewhat less strict regarding trade; England bankruptcy practically ends English support to Dutch Republic in Eighty Years' War
1627	1629	Anglo-French War (1627–1629): Siege of Saint-Martin-de-Ré; Siege of La Rochelle; Action of 17 July 1628; Surrender of Quebec	England; Scotland; Huguenots; Dutch Republic; Iroquois Confederacy; Mohawk; Susquehannock	France; Mi'kmaq; Abenakis; Innu; Wyandot; Huron	Status quo ante bellum: Treaty of Suza; Treaty of Saint-Germain-en-Laye (1632); English occupation of Quebec until 1632
1635	1635	Capture of Tortuga	England; France	Spain	Defeat
1635	1635	First attack on Providence island colony	England	Spain	Victory
1636	1638	Pequot War	Massachusetts Bay Colony Plymouth Colony Saybrook Colony Connecticut Colony Narragansett Mohegans	Pequot Tribe Western Niantic people	Victory: Pequot defeat and massacre; Treaty of Hartford (1638)
1640	1640	Second attack on Providence island colony	England	Spain; Kingdom of Portugal	Victory
1640	1668	Portuguese Restoration War: English expedition to Portugal (1662–1668); Battle of Ameixial; Battle of Montes Claros	Kingdom of Portugal; France; England	Crown of Spain	Victory: Treaty of Lisbon; Charles II of Spain recognizes the sovereignty of the House of Braganza over Portugal and its colonial possessions
1641	1641	Third attack on Providence island colony	England	Spain; Kingdom of Portugal	Defeat
1644	1646	Third Anglo-Powhatan War	Colony of Virginia	Powhatan Confederacy	Victory
1647	1647	Skirmish at the Isle of Wight	(Kingdom of England) England	Sweden	Inconclusive
1647	1647	Battle of Balasore	East India Company Dutch East India Company	Bengal Subah	Inconclusive
1651	1651	Stockholm incident	(Kingdom of England) England	Sweden	Victory
1652	1654	First Anglo-Dutch War	Commonwealth of England	Dutch Republic	Victory: Treaty of Westminster; Established domination of the seas and rise of England’s naval power
1654	1654	English Invasion of Acadia (1654)	Commonwealth of England; New England Confederation	France; New France	Victory: Forts of Saint John, Port Royal, and Pentagouet captured; Acadia becomes a British Colony from 1654-1667 until the Treaty of Breda (1667)
1654	1660	Anglo-Spanish War (1654–1660)	Commonwealth of England; France (1657–59)	Spain; Royalists of the British Isles	Victory: Treaties of Madrid (1667 and 1670).; Acquisition of Jamaica, the Cayman Islands, Dunkirk and Mardyck by the Commonwealth of England
1655	1655	Action of 14 April 1655	Commonwealth of England	Regency of Tunis Regency of Algiers	Victory
1660	1671	Caribbean War	England	Spain	Victory: This war is a follow up conflict from the Anglo-Spanish War (1654–1660) and largely shares the same results
1661	1665	Dano-Dutch War	England; Denmark–Norway	Dutch Republic	Victory: Cape Coast conquered
1662	1662	Battle of Tangier	(Kingdom of England) England	Morocco	Defeat
1664	1664	Battle of Tangier	(Kingdom of England) England	Morocco	Defeat
1665	1667	Second Anglo-Dutch War	England; Bishopric of Münster	Dutch Republic; Denmark; France	Defeat: Uti possidetis; Treaty of Breda
1669	1669	Battle of Cádiz	England	Regency of Algiers	Victory
1670	1670	Battle of Cape Spartel (1670)	England; Dutch Republic	Regency of Algiers	Victory
1671	1671	Battle of bougie	England	Regency of Algiers	Victory
1672	1674	Third Anglo-Dutch War	England; France; Bishopric of Münster; Electorate of Cologne	Dutch Republic; Denmark-Norway	Status quo ante bellum Status quo ante bellum: Treaty of Westminster (1674)
1672	1678	Franco-Dutch War: Flanders Expedition (1678)	England (1678) Dutch Republic; Holy Roman Empire (from 1673); Spain (from 1673); Brandenburg-Prussia (from 1673); Lorraine (from 1673); Denmark–Norway (from 1674)	England (1672–74) France; Münster (1672–1674); Cologne (1672–1674) (Sweden) Swedish Empire (from 1674)	Major French territorial gains: Treaty of Westminster (1674); Treaty of Nijmegen (1678–79); Franche-Comté and Spanish Netherlands cities ceded to France
1675	1677	Chowanoc War	Province of Carolina	Chowanocs	Victory
1675	1678	King Philip's War	New England Confederation Mohegans Pequots Mohawks	Wampanoags Nipmucks Podunks Narragansetts Nashaway Wabanakis	Partial Victory: New England Confederation Victory; Wabanaki Victory in Maine
1675	1675	Battle of Tangier	(Kingdom of England) England	Morocco	Defeat
1677	1682	Anglo-Algerian War	(Kingdom of England) England	Regency of Algiers	Defeat
1680	1680	Great Siege of Tangier	(Kingdom of England) England	Morocco	Victory
1684	1684	Raid on Charles Town	England	Spain	Defeat
1686	1690	Anglo-Mughal War	(Kingdom of England) England; East India Company	Mughal Empire	Defeat: Victory for the Mughal Empire; The British East India Company fined
1687	1688	Anglo-Siamese War	(Kingdom of England) England; East India Company	(Thailand) Kingdom of Ayutthaya (Siam) (Unauthorised piracy by English sailors under Siamese employ) • English defectors	Inconclusive English factory rejected from Siam, after minor naval action, along with massacre in the aftermath: the war was not pursued. In 1688, a coup forced the closure of all official European trade in Siam for 150 years except for the Dutch.
1688	1697	Nine Years' War: King William's War	Grand Alliance: Dutch Republic; England; Holy Roman Empire; Spanish Empire; Duchy of Savoy; Swedish Empire (until 1691); Scotland	France; Jacobites	Treaty of Ryswick: Louis XIV recognises William III of Orange as King of England, Scotland and Ireland.
1694	1700	Komenda Wars	Royal African Company	Dutch West India Company	Victory: English-supported Takyi Kuma becomes king of Eguafo.
1695	1695	Action of 18 April 1695	(Kingdom of England) England	Sweden Denmark–Norway	Defeat
1695	1695	Action of 10 August 1695	(Kingdom of England) England	Sweden	Victory
1695	1695	Anglo–Swedish skirmish (1695)	(Kingdom of England) England	Sweden	Victory
1699	1699	Siege of Tranquebar	East India Company Danish India	Thanjavur Maratha	Victory

== 18th century ==
Start	End	Name of conflict	Belligerents		Outcome
Start	End	Name of conflict	England & allies	England's opposition	Outcome
1701	1714	War of the Spanish Succession: Queen Anne's War	(Kingdom of England) England (until 1707) (Kingdom of Great Britain) Great Britain (from 1707) (Austrian Empire) Austrian monarchy Dutch Republic; Holy Roman Empire; Piedmont-Savoy (Kingdom of Prussia) Prussia; Habsburg Spain; Kingdom of Portugal	France (Spain) Spanish monarchy Bavaria (~1704); Cologne; Mantua (~1708)	Victory: Treaty of Utrecht: Philip V recognised as King of Spain by the Grand Alliance; Spain cedes the Spanish Netherlands, Kingdom of Naples, Duchy of Milan and Sardinia to the Austrian Habsburgs; Sicily to the Duchy of Savoy; and Gibraltar and Menorca to Britain.; France recognises British sovereignty over Rupert's Land and Newfoundland and cedes Acadia and its half of Saint Kitts to Britain.; Indecisive or failure for Britain's various allies.
1704	1704	Battle of Orford Ness	(Kingdom of England) England	Sweden	Victory

== Civil wars and revolutions ==
Start	End	Name of conflict	Belligerents		Outcome
Start	End	Name of conflict	English Government	Rebels	Outcome
1069	1070	Harrying of the North	William I of England	House of Wessex Kingdom of Denmark; Anglo-Saxons; Anglo-Scandinavians	Internal Conflict, William was Victorious An uprising which started 4 years after the Norman Conquest. Edgar Ætheling, the grandson of Edmund Ironside and the last notable heir to the House of Wessex, fought with the support of the King of Denmark Sweyn II, Anglo-Saxons, and Anglo-Scandinavians. It ended in defeat for the Anglo-Saxons & Anglo-Scandinavians. William the Conqueror paid Sweyn and his Danish fleet to go home, but the remaining rebels refused to meet him in battle, and he decided to starve them out by laying waste to the northern shires using scorched earth tactics. The Norman campaign to reconquer Northern England resulted in a genocide against the people living there.
1070	1071	Ely Rebellion	William I of England	King of Denmark Sweyn II; Hereward the Wake; Morcar; Bishop Aethelwine of Durham	Internal Conflict, William Victorius An anti-Norman insurrection centred on the Isle of Ely. The Danish king Sweyn Estrithson sent a small army to try to establish a camp on the Isle of Ely. The Isle became a refuge for Anglo-Saxon forces under Earl Morcar, Bishop Aethelwine of Durham and Hereward the Wake in 1071. The area was taken by William the Conqueror only after a prolonged struggle.
1075	1075	Revolt of the Earls	William I of England	Three earls: Ralph de Gael; Roger de Breteuil, 2nd Earl of Hereford; Waltheof, 1st Earl of Northumberland	Internal Conflict, William was Victorious: Waltheof was beheaded in 1076; Roger lost his lands and earldom, was imprisoned, and was beheaded in 1087.; Ralph lost his lands and earldom, and was expelled from England
1088	1088	Rebellion of 1088	England; William Rufus	Duchy of Normandy; Robert Curthose	Internal Conflict, William Rufus Victorius
1135	1154	The Anarchy	Supporters of Stephen of Blois	Supporters of Empress Matilda and Henry Curtmantle	Civil War: Treaty of Wallingford; Henry would do homage to Stephen, in return Stephen promised Henry would become King of England upon his death
1173	1174	Revolt of 1173–74	English royalists	English rebels Kingdom of France; Kingdom of Scotland; County of Flanders; County of Boulogne; Duchy of Brittany	Internal Conflict Treaty of Falaise: Scotland cedes the castles of Roxburgh, Berwick, Jedburgh, Edinburgh, and Stirling over to English soldiers; William is forced to recognize Henry's overlordship
1215	1217	First Barons' War	England Pro-Angevin forces	Rebel Barons France; Kingdom of Scotland	Civil War, Angevinian victory: Treaty of Lambeth; Restoration of Magna Carta
1264	1267	Second Barons' War: Battle of Northampton; Battle of Lewes; Battle of Evesham; Battle of Chesterfield	English royalists	Rebel barons Gwynedd	Civil War, Royalist victory: Capture and imprisonment of King Henry III by baronial forces; Establishment of de facto Protectorate ruled by Simon de Montfort's Parliament until 1265; Restoration of Royal Authority in 1266; Peace treaty agreed with Dictum of Kenilworth in 1267; Statute of Marlborough issued in 1267; legal confirmation of the Magna Carta and Parliament
1277	1278	Welsh Revolt (1277-1278)	England	Welsh Rebels	English Government Victory
1294	1295	Welsh Revolt (1294-1295): Battle of Maes Moydog	England	Welsh Rebels	English Government Victory
1316	1318	Welsh Revolt (1316-1318)	England	Welsh Rebels	English Government Victory
1321	1322	Despenser War	England: Edward II; Hugh Despenser the Elder; Hugh Despenser the Younger; Earl of Pembroke; Andrew Harclay	Contrariants: Marcher Lords; Earl of Lancaster (executed); Roger Mortimer (surrendered); Earl of Hereford †; Supported by: Kingdom of Scotland	Civil War, Decisive Royal victory: Return of the Despensers; Execution of rebels; Revocation of the Ordinances of 1311; Strengthening of the monarchy until 1326
1326	1326	Invasion of England (1326)	Royal government Edward II (POW); Hugh Despenser the Younger (executed); Hugh Despenser the Elder (executed); Earl of Arundel (executed)	Contrariants Supported by: County of Hainaut Isabella of France; Roger Mortimer; Earl of Leicester; Earl of Norfolk; Earl of Kent	Civil War, Contrariants' victory Continuation of the Despenser War. Isabella of France, and her lover, Roger Mortimers invasion led to: Executions of Hugh Despenser the Younger and Hugh Despenser the Elder; Abdication of Isabella's husband, King Edward II for their son Edward III; Edward II died, most likely assassinated by orders of Isabella and Mortimer.
1381	1381	Peasants' Revolt	Royal government	Rebel forces	Internal Conflict, Royal government victorious: Most rebel leaders executed; no further attempts by Parliament to impose a poll tax or to reform England's fiscal system.
1400	1400	Epiphany Rising	England	Rebels	Internal Conflict, Royal Victory: Rebellion Suppressed; Rebel leaders executed
1400	1415	Glyndŵr Rising; Part of the Hundred Years' War	England	Welsh rebels Percy family Duchy of Brittany; Kingdom of Scotland; Kingdom of France	Internal Conflict, Total English victory
1414	1414	Oldcastle Revolt	England	Lollards	Internal Conflict, Government Victory: Suppression of the revolt
1455	1485	Wars of the Roses	House of York Supported by: Burgundian State; Lordship of Ireland; Duchy of Brittany (Note: After Francis II became ill, his treasurer, Pierre Landais, ruling the Duchy in his stead, aided Richard III in attempting to capture Henry Tudor.)	House of Lancaster; House of Tudor Supported by: Kingdom of France; Kingdom of Scotland; Principality of Wales; Duchy of Brittany (Note: Francis II sheltered Henry Tudor, supplying him with money, troops, and ships. It was only after Francis fell ill that Henry was forced to flee Brittany to France.) Yorkist rebels	Civil War, Victory for the House of Lancaster and their allies: End of the Plantagenet dynasty; House of York reigns for 24 years; Extinction of the House of Lancaster; House of Tudor inherits Lancastrian claim to the throne and defeats the Yorkist dynasty; Establishment of the Tudor dynasty; End of the middle ages in England; Strengthening of the English monarchy under the Tudors; Dawn of the English Renaissance
1497	1497	Cornish Rebellion of 1497	England Henry VII; Giles, Lord Daubeny	Cornish rebels James, Baron Audley (executed); Thomas Flamank (executed); Michael An Gof (executed)	Internal Conflict, English victory
1549	1549	Prayer Book Rebellion	England (England) Edward VI (England) Edward Seymour (England) John Russell (England) Anthony Kingston (England) William Francis	Southwestern Catholic Rebels Sir Humphrey Arundell (executed); John Winslade (executed); John Bury (executed); Robert Welch, Vicar of St Thomas, Exeter (executed)	Internal Conflict, Edwardian victory: rebellion suppressed; execution of rebel commanders
1569	1570	Rising of the North	England Elizabeth I of England English and Welsh Protestants (Scotland) Scottish Protestants	(Scotland) Partisans of Mary, Queen of Scots (England) Northern English Catholics	Internal Conflict, Elizabethan Victory: Elizabeth's authority strengthened; Aristocracy of the North weakened
1608	1608	O'Doherty's rebellion	England: Kingdom of Ireland along with Gaelic allies	O'Doherty's rebels	Internal Conflict, Government Victory: Suppression of the revolt
1639	1651	Wars of the Three Kingdoms	Royalists Confederates	Parliamentarians Scottish Covenanters	Civil War, Parliamentarian victory Bishops' Wars (1639): Covenanters defeat Scottish Royalists and England; Second Bishops' War (1640): Covenanters defeat Scottish Royalists and England; Irish Rebellion of 1641: Founding of the Irish Catholic Confederation and beginning of the Irish Confederate Wars; First English Civil War (1642–46): (England) Parliamentarian & Scottish Covenanters victory over the Royalists; Irish Confederate Wars (1642–48): (England) Parliamentarian conquest of Ireland; Defeat of Royalists and crushing of Irish Catholic Confederation; Scotland in the Wars of the Three Kingdoms (1644–47): Covenanters defeat Royalists and Irish Confederation; Second English Civil War (1648): (England) English Parliamentarian victory over the Royalists and Scottish Covenanters forces.; Execution of King Charles I; Exile of Charles II; Establishment of the republican Commonwealth under Oliver Cromwell; Kirk Party takes power in Scotland; Cromwellian conquest of Ireland (1649): (England) English Parliamentarian & Protestant colonists victory over Irish Catholic Confederation and English Royalists; English Parliamentarian conquest of Ireland; End of the Irish Catholic Confederation; Act for the Settlement of Ireland 1652; Third English Civil War (1650–1652): Commonwealth of England victory over Scotland; Scotland absorbed into the Commonwealth of England
1685	1685	Monmouth Rebellion	(Kingdom of England) Royal army of James II	Rebel army of Duke of Monmouth	Internal Conflict, Victory for James II
1688	1689	Glorious Revolution	(Kingdom of England) James II	William of Orange; Dutch military forces British military forces	Internal Conflict: James II replaced as king by his daughter Mary II and her husband William III
1689	1746	Jacobite Rebellions	(Kingdom of England) England (until 1707) (Kingdom of Great Britain) Great Britain (from 1707)	Jacobites	Civil War, Royalist victory in England, Scotland and Ireland: Williamite War in Ireland (1688–91) - The Battle of the Boyne saw the last battle between two rival claimants for the throne; Jacobite rising of 1689 (1689–1692); Jacobite rising of 1715 (1715–16); Jacobite rising of 1719 (1719); Jacobite rising of 1745 (1741–1746) - Jacobite restoration attempt defeated

== Wars England did not partake in but supported ==
Start	End	Name of conflict	Belligerents		Outcome
Start	End	Name of conflict	Supported by England	Opposed by England	Outcome
1203	1206	Loon War	William; Holland; Supported by: England; House of Welf	Ada and Louis II; Loon Supported by: France; Hohenstaufen; Flanders; Brabant; Limburg; Utrecht; Liège	Military victory for William; Diplomatic victory for Louis; Long-term political victory for William
1496	1498	Italian War of 1494–1498	League of Venice: Papal States; Republic of Venice; Kingdom of Naples; Kingdoms of Spain; Duchy of Milan; Holy Roman Empire; Republic of Florence; Duchy of Mantua; Supported by: England	Kingdom of France: (Old Swiss Confederacy) Swiss mercenaries	Forced French retreat

== See also ==
- List of English civil wars
- List of wars in Great Britain
- Military history of England
- List of wars involving England and France
- List of wars involving England and Spain
- List of wars involving the United Kingdom

== Sources ==
- Guy, J. (1988). Tudor England. Oxford University Press. ISBN 978-0-19-285213-7. OCLC 17677564.
- Madden, Thomas F. (2006). The New Concise History of the Crusades. Rowman & Littlefield. ISBN 978-0-7425-3823-8.
- Martin, Colin; Parker, Geoffrey (1999). The Spanish Armada (Revised ed.). Manchester: Mandolin. ISBN 978-1-901341-14-0.
- McCaffrey, Wallace (1984). "Recent Writings on Tutor History". In Schlatter, Richard (ed.). Recent Views on British History: Essays on Historical Writing since 1966. Rutgers University Press. ISBN 978-0-8135-0959-4.
- Wagner, John A.; Schmid, Susan Walters, eds. (2011). Encyclopedia of Tudor England. ABC-CLIO. ISBN 978-1-59884-298-2.
- Weir, Alison (2006). Queen Isabella: She-Wolf of France, Queen of England. London: Pimlico Books. ISBN 978-0-7126-4194-4.
