= Battle of Stamford =

Battle of Stamford may refer to:

- Battle of Stamford (894)
- Battle of Stamford (918)
