= Pros Mund =

17th-century Danish-Norwegian naval officer

Pros Mund (ca. 1589–13 October 1644) was a Danish-Norwegian admiral during the Thirty Years War. He saw action as a commander in the Torstenson War against Sweden and died at sea in battle. French admiral Abraham Duquesne, at the time serving Sweden after having secured Mazarin’s permission, captured his flagship at the Battle of Fehmarn.

== Early life ==
Pros Mund was born in Eidanger in Norway and was the son of Nils Sørensen Mund of Bjerkevold and Ingeborg Prosdatter Hørby. He became naval lieutenant in 1624 and was promoted to captain in 1628. That year he was stationed in the southern part of the Baltic Sea, where he counteracted the Imperial designs for a fleet based in Rostock, Warnemünde, Wismar, and Greifswald, also supporting the defense of Stralsund.

In 1630 he was sent first to the Faroe Islands and the coast of Norway to defend trade shipping against piracy and later participated in the fight against Hamburg on the Elbe, where he patrolled with two ships the following year. He then patrolled the North Sea and the Norwegian coast, in 1633 as chief of a fleet squadron. In 1633 he was granted a fief on Iceland, on which he spent several winters and where his wife, Edel Urne, daughter of Johan Urne in Valsø, accompanied him in 1638.

== Torstenson War ==
When the Torstenson War with Sweden broke out in 1643, he was called in for duty with the fleet. In the beginning of 1644 he commanded a smaller squadron. After having joined forces in May with Admiral Ove Gjedde at Flækkerø (present-day island of Flekkerøy outside of Kristiansand) they sailed together into the North Sea where on 25 May they fought an undecided action against a combined Swedish-Dutch fleet under Dutch admiral Marten Thijssen. Upon the return to Flakkerø, Mund accused several of his officers for having betrayed him to the enemy.

On 1 July 1644 he participated in the naval Battle of Colberger Heide, as Quarter Admiral leading the 4th squadron. Again several of his ships' captains neglected their duties; at the very least, king Christian IV complained loudly about them, writing that they had used him as a shield between themselves and the enemy. Whether this complaint was justified or not, it did not apply to Mund himself, who participated with great courage in the battle. His flagship S:t Sophie appears to have suffered more casualties than any of the other ships.

== Death in the Fehmarn Belt ==
In September 1644, he was ordered to patrol the Fehmarn Belt between the islands of Fehmarn and Lolland. He was instructed to keep the waterway clear and observe the movements of the Swedish fleet with 17 ships of the line. While sickness ravaged his squadron, the Swedish main fleet commanded by Carl Gustaf Wrangel was unexpectedly joined by the auxiliary Dutch fleet under Marten Thijssen (now ennobled with the surname Anckarhjelm). These 42 ships attacked on 13 October. It is unclear whether the Danes were taken by surprise or whether Mund wanted to avoid an unequal fight. The Swedish-Dutch fleet overpowered the Danes. After stiff resistance, the Danish flagship Patientia was boarded. Mund was killed during the struggle and his body thrown into the sea. Only three ships escaped, the rest were captured or destroyed.

Pros Mund owned the family farm Bjerkevold in Eidanger, Norway and acquired Grevensvænge in Zealand. His widow came into possession of the nearby Rønnebæksholm.
