= Action of 10 August 1695 =

1695 naval engagement

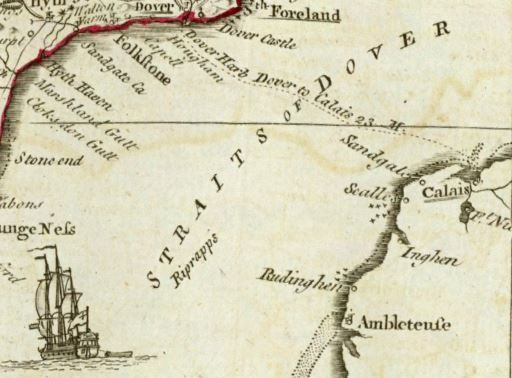
- 1790 map of the Strait of Dover
Date	10 August 1695
Location	Strait of Dover
Result	English victory

Belligerents
England	(yes) Sweden

Commanders and leaders
(Kingdom of England) Richard Culliford (Kingdom of England) Richard Athy	(Swedish Empire) Erik Ribbing (DOW)

Strength
2 frigates 2 brigantines	1 ship of the line

Casualties and losses
Several killed 1 frigate damaged	4 killed 3 wounded 1 ship of the line captured

The action of 10 August 1695 was a naval skirmish between the Swedish Navy warship Wachtmeister and a four-ship squadron of the English Royal Navy during the Nine Years' War. It ended with the English capturing Wachtmeister.

== Background ==
On 10 August 1695, while she was convoying Swedish merchantmen to France during the Nine Years' War, Swedish Navy ship of the line Wachtmeister encountered a four-ship squadron of the English Royal Navy in the Strait of Dover. The squadron included the frigates Mermaid and Maidstone and two brigantines.

Wachtmeister's captain, Erik Ribbing, was ordered by the English to strike his ship's mizzen topsail for "the King of England's ships", with Ribbing promptly responding by stating "No! We have no such orders." The English subsequently dispatched a rowboat to Wachtmeister, and an officer came aboard and repeated the order to strike the ship's mizzen topsail, with Ribbing again refusing to do so.

During his departure from Wachtmeister, the English officer hinted they would ensure the mizzen topsail would be lowered anyway. An English warship proceeded to position itself in front of Wachtmeister, and another moved behind the Swedish ship's quarterdeck. Ribbing proceeded to prepare Wachtmeister for battle, but waited for the English to attack, as his orders were only to defend himself and not to attack other ships.

== Action ==
Mermaid and Maidstone fired a sudden broadside at Wachtmeister before attacking the Swedes with small-arms fire. The Swedish immediately returned fire, and the English attempted to collapse Wachtmeister's masts and rigging, concentrating their fire at those parts of the ship.

After a furious engagement, the sails of Wachtmeister were in tatters, and, no longer being able to be manually controlled, the ship began drifting with the current; in response, the Swedes dropped the ship's anchor. During the first English broadside, Ribbing had been mortally wounded by two musket balls, with one going through his abdomen and lodging itself in his back and the other one going through his arm. He was carried down to his cabin, where he ordered the Swedish flag to be lowered and Wachtmeister's crew to cease firing.

A boatswain ran to Lieutenant Klöfverskjöld, who was directing the Wachtmeister's gunfire, and informed him of Ribbing's orders. The Swedish flag was lowered and Klöfverskjöld rushed to Ribbing's cabin and asked him if the flag should be raised again. Ribbing responded by saying "certainly not" and ordered Klöfverskjöld to go to the Downs immediately. A Swedish lieutenant was then dispatched to the English, informing them the Swedes had surrendered and were willing to be escorted to the Downs. An English officer guided Wachtmeister there, ending the battle.

== Aftermath ==
On the morning following the battle, Ribbing succumbed to his injuries at three o'clock. The English suffered several men killed during the engagement, including one lieutenant, and one of their frigates was heavily damaged. Swedish losses were similar, with four Swedes killed and three injured.

== See also ==
- Skirmish at the Isle of Wight – 1647 naval engagement
- Stockholm incident – Seizure of a Swedish ship by English ships in 1651
- Action of 18 April 1695 – Skirmish between an English ship and a Dano-Swedish fleet
- Anglo–Swedish skirmish (1695) – Anglo-Swedish naval skirmish
- Battle of Orford Ness (1704) – 1704 battle of the Great Northern War
