= Battle of Listerdyb =

1644 naval battle of the Torstenson War

Coordinates: 55°4.41′N 8°27.14′E

- Part of the Torstenson War
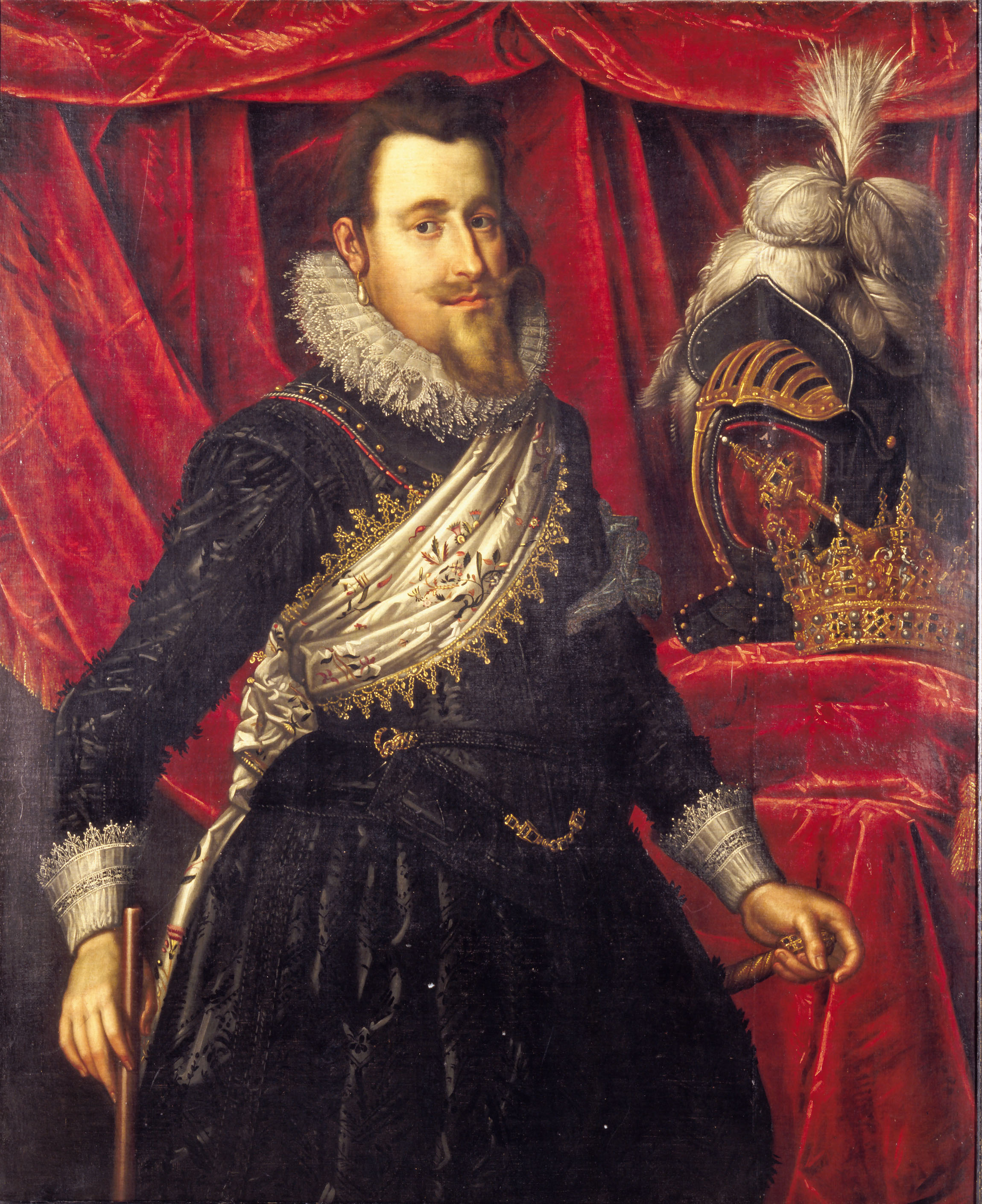
- Christian IV, Pieter Isaacsz
Date	16 May 1644
Location	Off Jutland, North Sea
Result	Dano-Norwegian victory

Belligerents
Denmark-Norway	(yes) Swedish Empire

Commanders and leaders
Christian IV	(yes) Maerten Thijssen

Strength
9 warships	26 Merchantmen

This battle took place on 16 May 1644 during the Torstenson War near List Deep, between Sylt and Rømø in western Denmark. Nine Danish ships under King Christian IV forced a retreat back into List Deep of 26 smaller Dutch ships (13 under Marten Thijsen and 13 under Hendrik Gerritsen) which had been leased to Sweden. 4 more Dutch ships from Marcus' squadron appeared during the battle but took no part.

== Ships involved ==
=== Denmark ===
Trefoldighed 48
Tre Løver 46
Lindorm 38
Norske Løve 30
Neptunus 28
Sorte Rytter 24
Phenix 20
Postillion 14
Hollandske Fregat 12

=== Sweden (Dutch fleet) ===
Gulde Swaen (flag)
Grooten Dolphien (2nd flag of Gerritsen)
Lange Bark
10 others plus 4 under Marcus
