= Battle of Fehmarn (1644) =

Part of the Torstenson War

Coordinates: 54°40.41′N 11°2.14′E

- Part of the Torstenson War
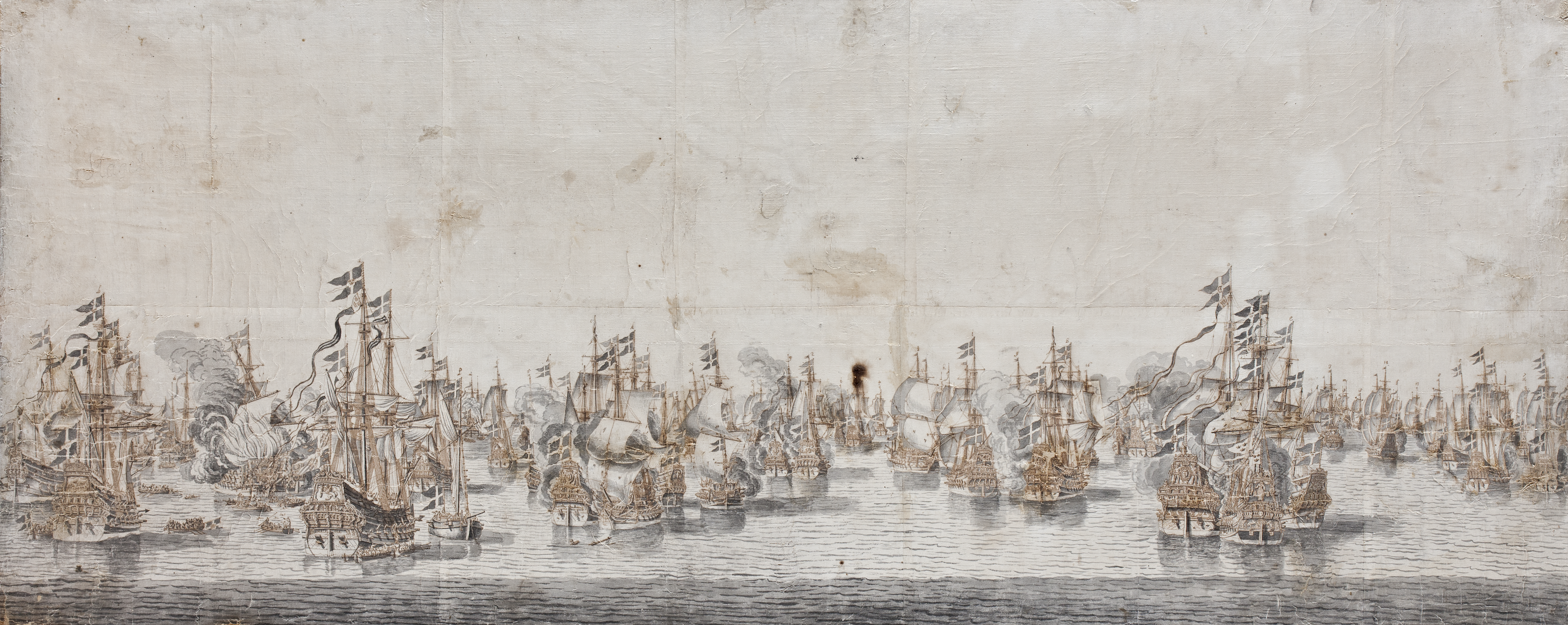
- Naval battle of Fehmarn
Date	13 October 1644
Location	Proximity of Fehmarn
Result	Swedish victory

Belligerents
Swedish Empire	Denmark–Norway

Commanders and leaders
(Swedish Empire) Carl Gustaf Wrangel (Swedish Empire) Mårten Anckarhielm	(Denmark–Norway) Pros Mund † (Denmark–Norway) Corfits Ulfeldt (POW) (Denmark–Norway) Benjamin Grabov (POW) (Denmark–Norway) von Jasmund (POW)

Strength
16 Swedish ships with 392 guns 21 Dutch ships with 483 guns	17 ships with 448 guns

Casualties and losses
1 Dutch ship sunk 59 dead	10 ships captured 2 ships wrecked 100 dead 1,000 sailors captured

The battle of Fehmarn took place north-west of the island of Fehmarn, now part of Germany, in the Baltic Sea. A combined Swedish fleet, with a large element of hired Dutch ships, defeated a Danish fleet and took 1,000 prisoners, including Ulfeldt, Benjamin Grabov and von Jasmund. The Danish admiral Pros Mund was killed in the battle.

The Swedes had 16 ships with 392 guns, and the hired Dutch element had 21 ships with 483 guns (making a total of 37 ships with 875 guns). The Danes had 17 ships with 448 guns. The Swedes expended two fireships and one hired Dutch ship was lost. The Danes lost 10 ships captured, including their largest three, and two wrecked.

== Battle ==
On the morning of 13 October the Swedish fleet weighed anchor and prepared for battle by dividing into two Swedish and three Dutch squadrons. One of the Swedish squadrons was led by Wrangel on Smålands Lejon and the other under vice admiral Peter Blum on Draken. The Dutch squadrons were commanded by Mårten Anckarhielm (previously Maerten Thijssen) onboard Jupiter, vice admiral Henrik Gerretsen on Groote Dolphijn and schout-bij-nacht Pieter Marcussen on Groot Vliessingen.

The Danish fleet was divided in two squadrons under admiral Pros Mund on Patentia and Joachim Grabow on Lindormen. Around 10 am the larger ships in both fleets were within firing range of each other and started firing. The smaller Danish ships retreated from the battle, but were pursued by the Dutch ships.

Early in the battle the Swedish flagship Smålands Lejon was so damaged in her rigging and hull that she had to pull out. The Swedish ships Regina and Göteborg attacked and boarded the Danish flagship Patentia. The Danish admiral Pros Mund was killed during the fighting.

The Swedish fire ship Meerman was sent against the Danish Lindormen, which quickly caught fire and exploded. The wreck was discovered in 2012. Swedish Nya Fortuna captured the Danish man-of-war Oldenborg by boarding. The last man-of-war Tre Løver veered off, but was pursued by Anckarhielm's Dutch Jupiter, Patentia and Swarte Arent. Tre Løver managed to sink Swarte Arent before the two other Dutch ships boarded her.

The smaller Danish vessels Tu Løver, Havhesten, and Fides were captured by Dutch Jupiter and Groote Dolphijn. A cluster of Danish ships were forced against the shore of Lolland, among them Neptunus, Nellebladet, Stormarn, and Kronet Fisk. These were later towed by the Dutch. Danish Delmenhorst went aground and exploded after being set on fire by the Swedish fire ship Delfin. Danish Markatten, Højenhald and a galleot also went aground, but cannon fire from land protected them from the Dutch. Only Pelikanen and Lammet managed to escape and sail to Copenhagen on 17 October.

== Consequences ==
The Danes lost twelve ships, of which ten were captured. A hundred men perished and about 1,000 were captured. The ship Swarte Arent was the only loss on the Swedish side; its crew was rescued. In total, the Swedish side suffered only 59 deaths.

The victory was one of the greatest in the history of the Royal Swedish Navy. Even if transshipping Torstensson's soldiers to the Danish islands was no longer a threat, since these were now intent on meeting general Gallas' Imperial troops approaching from the south, the Danes realized that Sweden had total naval dominance after the battle. This paved the way for negotiations and eventually the treaty of Brömsebro on 13 August 1645.

== Ships involved ==
=== Sweden ===
- Drake 40
- Smålands Lejon 32 (flag)
- Göteborg 36
- Leopard 36
- Regina 34
- Tre Kroner 32
- Jägare 26
- Vesterviks Fortuna 24
- Akilles 22
- Svan 22
- Gamla Fortuna 18
- Lam 12 (galley)
- Fenix 10 (galley)
- Postpferd 2 (galley/galliot)
- Lilla Delfin (fireship) – Burnt
- Meerman (fireship) – Burnt
- ? (merchantman)

=== Dutch element of Swedish fleet ===
- Delphin 38
- Jupiter 34
- Engel 34
- Gekroende Liefde 31
- Coninchva Sweden 28
- Campen 26
- Den Swarten Raven 26
- Vlissingen 24
- Nieuw Vlissingen 24
- St Matthuis 24
- Patientia 24
- Arent/Adelaar 22 – Sunk by Tre Løver
- Nieuw Gottenburg 22
- Liefde van Hoorn 20
- Prins 20
- Wapen van Medenblik 20
- Posthorn 20
- Brouwer 20
- St Marten 20
- Harderinne 8
- ? 2 (galliot)

=== Denmark ===
- Patienta 48 (flag, Pros Mund) – Captured
- Tre Løver 46 – Captured
- Oldenborg 42 – Captured
- Lindorm 38 (Henrik Mund)
- Pelican 36
- Stormar 32 (Corfits Ulfeldt) – Captured
- Delmenhorst 28 (Hans Knudsen) – Captured
- Fides 28 – Captured
- Neptunus 28 – Captured
- Nelleblad 24 – Captured
- To Løver 22 – Captured
- Kronet Fisk 20 – Aground and captured
- Lam 16
- Markat 16
- Havhest 14
- Højenhald 8 – Wrecked
- ? 2 (galley/galliot) – Wrecked

== Sources ==
- Lars Ericson Wolke, Martin Hårdstedt, Medströms Bokförlag (2009). Svenska sjöslag
