= Gustaf von Psilander =

Swedish naval officer

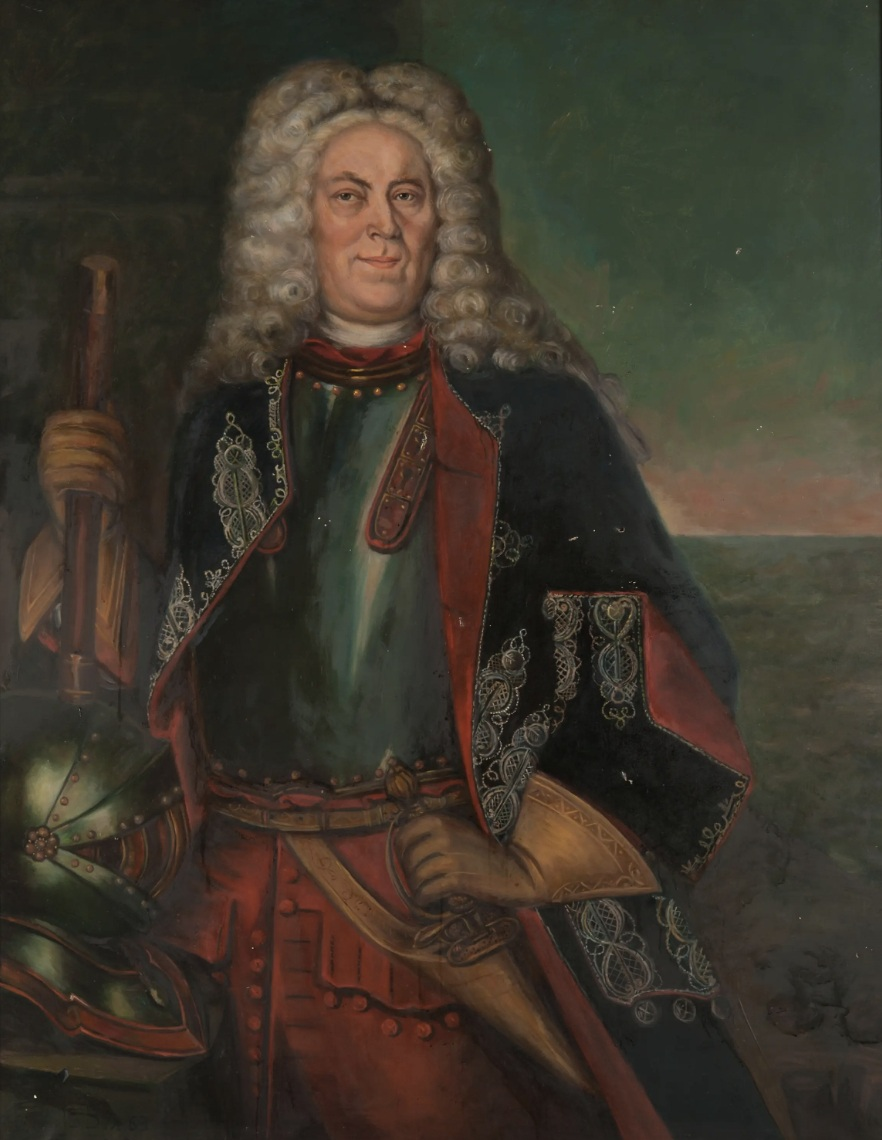
- Portrait of von Psilander attributed to David Klöcker Ehrenstrahl
- Born: 16 August 1669; Stockholm, Sweden
- Died: 18 March 1738 (aged 68) Karlskrona, Sweden
- Allegiance: Sweden; Dutch Republic
- Branch: Swedish Navy; Dutch States Navy
- Service years: 1687–1738
- Rank: Admiral (Swedish Navy)
- Commands: Öland
- Conflicts: Nine Years' War; Battle of Beachy Head (1690); Great Northern War; Battle of Orford Ness (1704); Battle of Køge Bay (1710)
- Spouse: Ingrid Lepin (m. 1697, d. 1727)

Admiral Gustaf von Psilander (16 August 1669 – 18 March 1738) was a Swedish naval officer who served in the Nine Years' War and Great Northern War. He fought his most famous action in the Battle of Orford Ness against a superior Royal Navy squadron in 1704. Though von Psilander was defeated, he was celebrated for his bravery in fighting against a larger force.

== Early life ==
Psilander was the son of a clerk in the Royal Wardrobe, who died when Psilander was eleven years old. Raised by a friend of the father, the Stockholm Alderman Johan Hagemeister, he joined the Swedish Navy as a clerk in 1687. Two years later Psilander was promoted to gunner's mate, and the following year to gunner. To gain experience, and achieve promotion, Psilander joined the Dutch States Navy during the Nine Years' War, serving as a naval rating and petty officer, fighting in the 1690 Battle of Beachy Head. Promoted to sub-lieutenant in the Swedish navy in his absence, he returned to Sweden in 1695.

== Wars ==
Psilander's coat of arm as ennobled contain clear references to the Battle of Orford Ness.

At the outbreak of the Great Northern War, Psilander served as Admiral Cornelius Anckarstjerna's flag captain, escorting Charles XII of Sweden and the Swedish Army to Pärnu. After serving as a frigate captain in the Bay of Finland, he became captain of the 56-gun ship of the line Öland and charged with convoying Swedish merchantmen during the Great Northern War. During one of these expeditions, Psilander encountered a Royal Navy squadron of eight ships of the line and one frigate under Rear-admiral William Whetstone on 7 August 1704. Whetstone demanded the Swedish salute his ships as they were in English waters, though Psilander refused as he was under strict orders by Charles XII to not salute foreign ships first. This led to a four-hour battle, during which the English captured Öland along with the merchantmen she was convoying, though they were soon released and returned home.

Psilander commanded a ship of the line in the 1710 Battle of Køge Bay, and became deputy superintendent of the Swedish naval shipyard in Karlskrona in the same year. Promoted to Schoutbynacht and Admiralty commissioner in 1712, he was also ennobled the same year. Patronised by Charles XII since his defeat at Orford Ness, Psilander was promoted to vice admiral and appointed superintendent of the Karlskrona shipyard in 1714 before becoming a full admiral in 1715.

In 1716, he was appointed as the governor of Gotland, which was repeatedly raided by the Imperial Russian Navy. Psilander's mission was to organise the local population in a homeland defence, but this proved unfeasible when the Russian galley fleet under Admiral Fyodor Apraksin carried out a week-long raid on parts of the island in July 1717 . Psilander then had to devote himself to recruiting personnel and obtaining supplies and tax funds for the King's last military operations.

== Later life ==
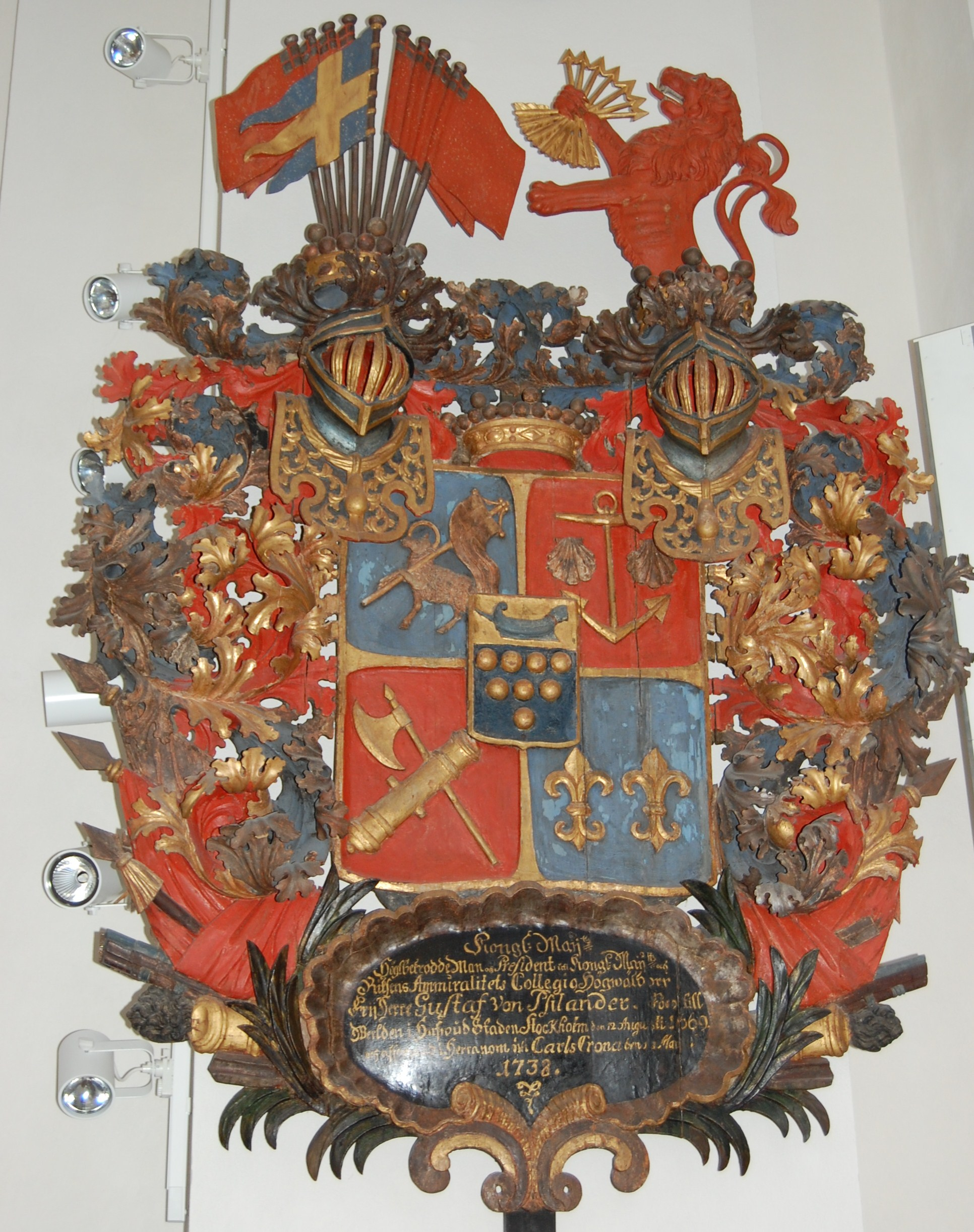
Psilander's baronial coat of arms is more elaborate, but still contain references to the 1704 battle.

After the death of the King in 1718, Psilander belonged to those favoured by the new regime. He became a Baron in 1719, was suggested as Privy Councillor, and commanded a squadron that blocked the Russian Navy at Gdansk. Psilander now belonged to the political elite of the country, participating in all Parliaments from 1719 to 1732. In 1728, he was transferred to the Governorship of Kalmar Län in order to be closer to Karlskrona, the seat of the Swedish Board of Admiralty. In 1734 he was one of three naval officers proposed to be Naval Privy Counsellor, but the King chose Admiral Edvard Didrik Taube instead, and appointed Psilander president of the Admiralty Board, replacing the promoted Taube. Psilander's older brother Johan became Comptroller of the Swedish Navy and was ennobled in 1720 under the name "Psilanderhielm".

== Legacy ==
Gustaf von Psilander has the following vessels named after him:

- HSwMS Psilander (1899) was a torpedo cruiser launched in 1899 and decommissioned in 1937 and sunk as target in 1939
- HSwMS Psilander (18) was a destroyer launched in 1926 and decommissioned in 1947
