= Stockholm incident =

Seizure of a Swedish ship by English ships in 1651

Date	July 1651
Location	English Channel
Result	English victory

Belligerents
(yes) Swedish Empire	England

Commanders and leaders
(Swedish Empire) Sybraut Jellis (WIA)	Unknown

Units involved
(Swedish Empire) Stockholm	(England) Jonsco Frigot (England) Phoenix

Strength
1 ship	2 ships

Casualties and losses
1 killed Several wounded	Unknown

The Stockholm incident was an event in July 1651 when English privateer ships, namely the Man-of-war Jonsco Frigot and the Phoenix fought with the Stockholm, a Swedish ship heading back from Portugal. The fighting ended with the Stockholm giving up after the Phoenix arrived to support the Jonsco Frigot.

== Incident ==
In July 1651, the Stockholm was on her homeward bound voyage with a large cargo of sugar and salt before being stopped by the English man-of-war Jonso Frigot in the English Channel. She was asked to strike her sail and deliver her papers to the Englishmen. This came as a surprise to the Swedes, as two Dutch and one Danish ship had been allowed to freely sail on their way. Acting upon the belief that the English privateer ship seemed to be an Irish pirate, the captain of the Stockholm, Sybraut Jellis, opened fire on the Englishmen and fought for several hours in an attempt to defend his ship. The Stockholm would however yield when another English vessel, the Phoenix, joined the action. After the fighting, the Stockholm would be seized by the English.

== Aftermath ==
During the fighting, the Swedes suffered one man killed and several others wounded, including Sybraut Jellis himself. The likely reason behind the Swedish resistance is that one of the main owners of the Stockholm, Richard Clerck, was a Scottish admiral in Swedish service. Moreover, the Swedes were likely already tired of being subject to English claims of superiority at sea.

The incident resulted in direct diplomatic overtures to England, initially opened by the Riksråd in August of the same year when another co-owner of the Stockholm, Benjamin Bonnel, received permission to travel to England in order to recover the Stockholm.

== See also ==
- Skirmish at the Isle of Wight – 1647 naval engagement
- Action of 18 April 1695 – Skirmish between an English ship and a Dano-Swedish fleet
- Action of 10 August 1695 – 1695 naval engagement
- Anglo–Swedish skirmish (1695) – Anglo-Swedish naval skirmish
- Battle of Orford Ness (1704) – 1704 battle of the Great Northern War

== Works cited ==
- Murdoch, Steve (2019). 'Breaching Neutrality': English prize-taking and Swedish neutrality in the First Anglo-Dutch War, 1651–1654 (PDF). Routledge. pp. 3–4.
