= Treaty of Durham (1139) =

1139 treaty between England and Scotland

The second treaty of Durham was a peace treaty concluded between kings Stephen of England and David I of Scotland, on 9 April 1139.

== Background ==
On 22 August 1138, the Scottish army under the command of David I had been defeated at the Battle of the Standard. Though the Scottish rout was total, the mediation of the newly arrived papal legate, Alberic of Ostia, and the influence of Stephen's queen, Matilda of Boulogne who was David's niece, solidified the truce that had been established at Carlisle. Additional, Stephen was to face another problem when Empress Matilda decided to retake the crown of England usurped by Stephen after the death of Henry I of England and a landing seemed imminent. This would mark the beginning of the English civil war known as The Anarchy. Stephen, not wishing to face several forces at once had to make concessions with the Scottish king.

== Content ==
David's son Henry was given the earldom of Northumberland which included Carlisle, Cumberland, Westmorland and Lancashire to the north of Ribble, except the castles of Bamburgh and Newcastle. Moreover, Stephen recognised the independence of Scotland. David I, via his son Henry, now controlled an English territory which stretched to the Tees.

== See also ==
- England and King David I
- Treaty of Durham (1136)
