= Skirmish at the Isle of Wight =

1647 naval engagement

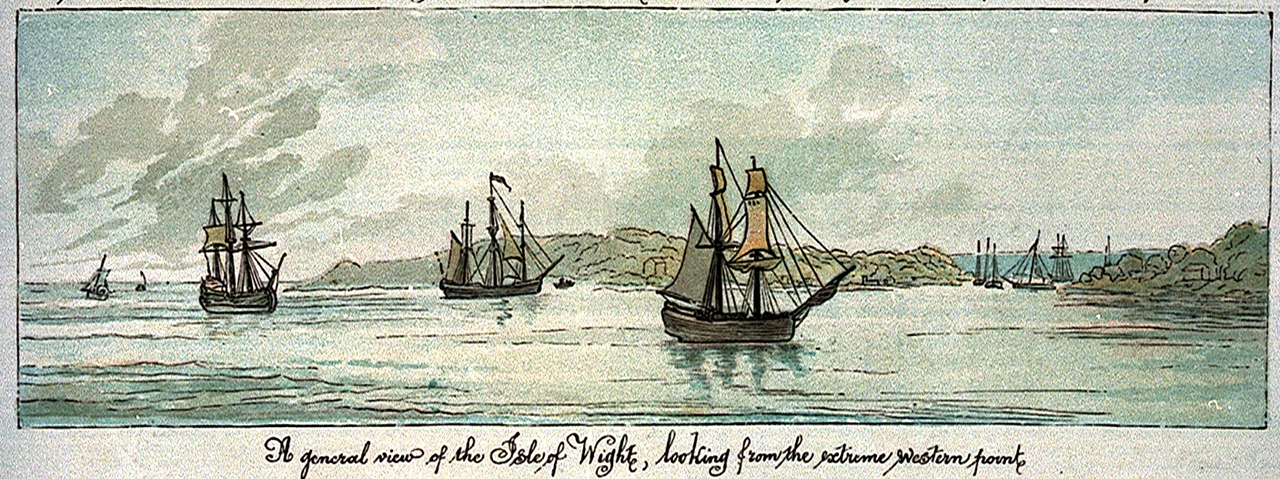
- An illustration of the Isle of Wight
Date	1 May 1647
Location	Off the Isle of Wight
Result	See Aftermath

Belligerents
Swedish Empire	Kingdom of England

Commanders and leaders
Mårten Anckarhielm	Richard Owen

Strength
5 warships 10 merchant ships	2 warships 2 merchant ships

Casualties and losses
	8 men killed 1 warship damaged

The skirmish at the Isle of Wight (Swedish: Skärmytsling vid Isle of Wight) was a brief naval skirmish between Swedish and English warships off the Isle of Wight on 1 May 1647 during the English Civil War. It ended with the Swedish outrunning their English pursuers, although one Swedish warship was later taken by the English into the Downs on 3 May after being discovered at anchor in Boulogne-sur-Mer.

== Background ==
On 1 May 1647, English Rear-Admiral Richard Owen, commanding the 42-gun Henrietta Maria and accompanied by the 14-gun Roebuck, encountered a Swedish Navy squadron of five warships convoying ten Swedish merchantmen off the Isle of Wight during the English Civil War. The Swedish ships refused to lower their colours despite the English firing several warning shots. Owen proceeded to send a subordinate officer to Leopard, the flagship of the Swedish squadron, to demand an explanation for the refusal. The squadron's commander, Admiral Mårten Anckarhielm, explained he had been given orders from Christina, Queen of Sweden not to lower the Swedish flag to any foreign power.

== Skirmish ==
Upon receiving Anckarhielm's response, Owen signalled two nearby English merchantmen heading south to assist in detaining the Swedes. During his discussions with the English, Anckarhielm ordered the topsail of Leopard to be raised in an attempt to flee, drawing the English into a pursuit just before nightfall. Owen's ship engaged a Swedish warship, firing several broadsides at her from close range. However, Henrietta Maria was heavily damaged during the exchange, which forced her to temporarily halt her pursuit before resuming the chase. Roebuck, whose commander had already warned Anckarhielm that combat would ensue if his ships did not lower their colours, fired shots at the Swedish convoy before nightfall forced him to end his pursuit. In the engagement, in which the Swedes outran their English pursuers, Owen's ships lost no more than 8 men killed, with the whole affair lasting for no more than six hours.

== Aftermath ==
After the engagement, English Vice-Admiral William Batten was informed of the situation on 2 May. He sailed out with several warships, including St Andrew, Garland, Convertine and Mary Rose, arriving at where Anckarhielm's ships had anchored near Boulogne-sur-Mer on the morning of 3 May. After finding the Swedish convoy anchored with their flags lowered, Batten approached and boarded Leopard. Anckarhielm was still onboard the Leopard, and the other Swedish warships in Boulogne at the time were Angel Raphael, Nelptune, Anna–Free and Neptune.

Upon boarding, Batten questioned the Swedes about the engagement on 1 May. Initially, the Swedes denied engaging with the English at all, but eventually admitted to firing at Owen's ships, mostly due to the strict orders they had received from Queen Christina. The Swedes informed Batten that they were willing to die rather than dishonouring their commissions. Batten criticised Owen for not attacking Leopard despite being in close proximity with her for several hours. He also inquired about Owen's ships, with the Swedes alleging they had last been seen near Beachy Head, a claim Batten found implausible.

The following day was spent with the gathering of testimonies and copying the commissions, with the Swedish commanders being treated with respect but also held as prisoners aboard Batten's ship. An English council of war was assembled, which decided to forcibly escort a single Swedish warship to the Downs. The English allowed the rest of the Swedish convoy to continue on its journey. However, the remaining Swedish ships followed the English to the Downs, declaring they would not return without the detained warship. The Parliament of England produced a report on the skirmish, a copy which was sent to Stockholm; the report "noted that the convoy and escorts were all released – an admission that they had no legal right to hold them", though the English captains were also praised for upholding "the King's sovereignty at sea".

== See also ==
- Stockholm incident – Seizure of a Swedish ship by English ships in 1651
- Action of 18 April 1695 – Skirmish between an English ship and a Dano-Swedish fleet
- Action of 10 August 1695 – 1695 naval engagement
- Anglo–Swedish skirmish (1695) – Anglo-Swedish naval skirmish
- Battle of Orford Ness (1704) – 1704 battle of the Great Northern War

== Works cited ==
- O'Mahoney, Michael James (2011). THE NAVY IN THE ENGLISH CIVIL WAR. University of Exeter. p. 100.
- Murdoch, Steve (2019). 'Breaching Neutrality': English prize-taking and Swedish neutrality in the First Anglo-Dutch War, 1651–1654 (PDF). Routledge. p. 136.
