= Anglo-Swedish skirmish (1695) =

Anglo-Swedish naval skirmish

Date	December 1695
Location	Unknown, en-route to Portugal
Result	English victory
Territorial changes	Livland captured and later released

Belligerents
England	(yes) Swedish Empire

Commanders and leaders
Unknown	(Swedish Empire) Per Olofsson

Units involved
(England) HMS Burlington (England) Siren	(Swedish Empire) Livland

Strength
2 ships	1 ship

Casualties and losses
Unknown	Several killed and wounded

The Anglo-Swedish skirmish refers to an incident where the Swedish ship Livland, commanded by Per Olofsson refused to salute two English ships, respectively the Burlington and the Siren. His refusal led to a skirmish and the subsequent damaging of the Livland

== Skirmish ==
On the way towards Portugal with a delayed convoy, Captain Per Olofsson of the Livland encountered the two English ships, the Burlington and the Siren. The English ships ordered the Livland to strike its mizzen sail, even though he had already, according to international practice, fired Swedish recognition signals, namely two cannon shots.

Olofsson promptly refused to do so, and drank the king's toast in wine with his officers while the Livland prepared for battle. Olofsson also made a promise with his officers to fight until the last man.

After a short but intense battle, during which several Swedes were killed and wounded, the Livland gave up and was taken into Plymouth.

== Aftermath ==
After some time, the Livland was freed. However, the captain, Per Olofsson, was accused in front of the Swedish Admiralty court for giving his ship up. Initially, he was sentenced to death, but he was later pardoned by Charles XII.

== See also ==
- Action of 10 August 1695 – 1695 naval engagement
- Action of 18 April 1695 – Skirmish between an English ship and a Dano-Swedish fleet
- Stockholm incident – Seizure of a Swedish ship by English ships in 1651
- Skirmish at the Isle of Wight – 1647 naval engagement
