= Mårten Anckarhielm =

Dutch admiral

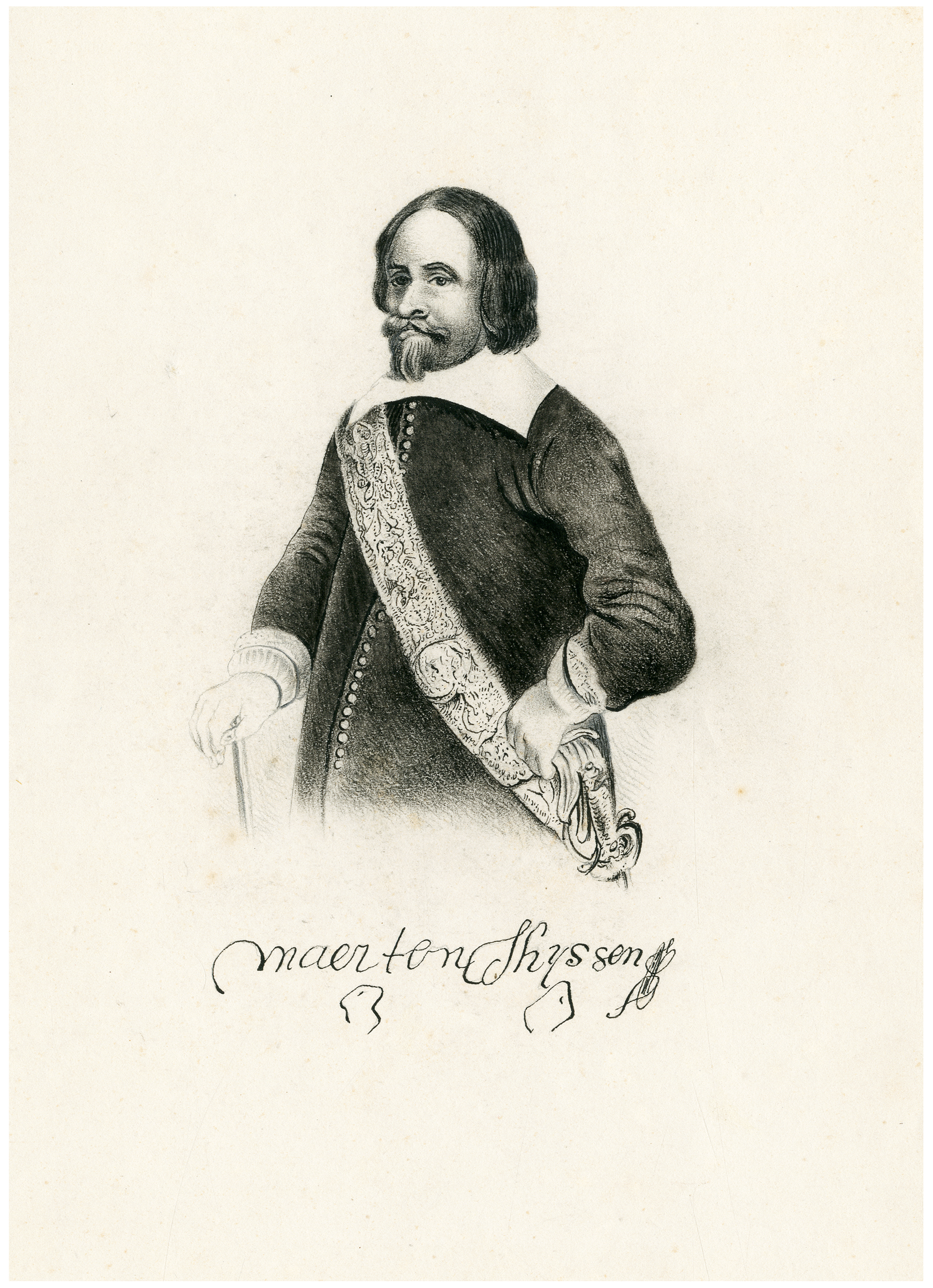
- Maerten Thijssen Anckerheim, portrayed by Jacobus Cornelis Wendel
- Born: Maerten Thijssen; Vlissingen, Dutch Republic
- Died: 21 March 1657; Gothenburg, Sweden
- Other name: Mårten Thyssens
- Military career
- Allegiance: Dutch Republic (Sweden) Swedish Empire
- Branch: Admiralty of Zeeland; Royal Swedish Navy
- Service years: 1631–1644; 1644–1657
- Rank: Vice admiral Netherlands; Admiral Sweden
- Commands: Dutch squadron in Swedish service Swedish squadron in Göteborg
- Conflicts: Battle of Albrolhos 1631; Battle of Listerdyb 1644; Battle of Fehmarn 1644; Skirmish at the Isle of Wight
- Awards: Ennobled 1644

Maerten Thijssen (died 1657) was a Dutch admiral who entered into Swedish service, becoming a Swedish admiral and a Swedish nobleman under the name Mårten Anckarhielm. He played an important role at the Battle of Fehmarn 1644.

== Dutch service ==
Thijssen distinguished himself as Dutch vlootvoogd (squadron commander) in the service of the Dutch West India Company at the Battle of Abrolhos 1631. When the fleet returned to the Netherlands in 1634 he became master-attendant and munitions-master at the Admiralty of Zeeland at Vlissingen.

== Torstenson War ==
After the outbreak of the war between Sweden and Denmark-Norway, the Dutch-Swedish industrialist Louis De Geer in 1644 equipped at his own expense, a Dutch squadron under Thijssen, to strengthen the Swedish navy. When he learned of the new threat, Christian IV of Denmark broke the siege of Gothenburg, and sailed to meet the Dutch. The fleets met at Listerdyb, and the Dutch squadron was forced back to Vlissingen. Soon enough it returned to Scandinavian waters, chasing away the Danish ships blockading Gothenburg, then sailing through the Sound to Kalmar. In October the Swedish main fleet strengthened by the Dutch squadron left Kalmar, and in the following naval battle of Fehmarn the united fleets defeated a Danish fleet; the Dutch squadron taking four Danish ships at the early stages of the battle, and then another four that the Danes had deliberately beached.

== Swedish service ==
After the victory at Fehmarn, Anckarhielm brought the Dutch squadron back to Vlissingen, but returned to Sweden in 1645, receiving the naval command at Gothenburg, which he successfully held in face of a siege by Danish naval and ground forces. When the peace with Denmark was concluded, he commanded the naval force that escorted a Swedish trading expedition to Portugal. On the return voyage, Anckarhielm engaged a six-hour skirmish with two English warships which demanded he strike his colours off the Isle of Wight. He remained in command at Gothenburg until his death, and did not participate in the Second Northern War that began in 1655.
