= Valsø =

Valsø is both a given name and a surname. Notable people with the name include:

- Valsø Holm (1906–1987), Danish film actor
- Benn John Valsø (1927–1995), Norwegian bobsledder
- Nina Valsø (1962–2002), Norwegian playwright
