= Action of 18 April 1695 =

Skirmish between an English ship and a Dano-Swedish fleet

| Date | 18 April, 1695 (4 hours) |
| Location | Off the coast of Sussex |
| Result | Dano-Swedish victory |

Belligerents
| (yes) Swedish Empire; Denmark–Norway | England |

Commanders and leaders
| (Swedish Empire) Gustaf Wattrang | (England) Anthony Tollett |

Units involved
| (Swedish Empire) Wachtmeister | (England) Seahorse |

Strength
| 1 ship | 1 ship |

Casualties and losses
| None | 1 ship damaged Several wounded |

The Action of 18 April 1695 refers to an incident where an English frigate by the name of Sea-horse demanded that the Swedish man of war Wachtmeister lower its topsail on 18 April 1695, after the refusal of the Wachtmeister, a firefight broke out, resulting in the Sea-horse retreating and the Dano-Swedish convoy emerging victorious.

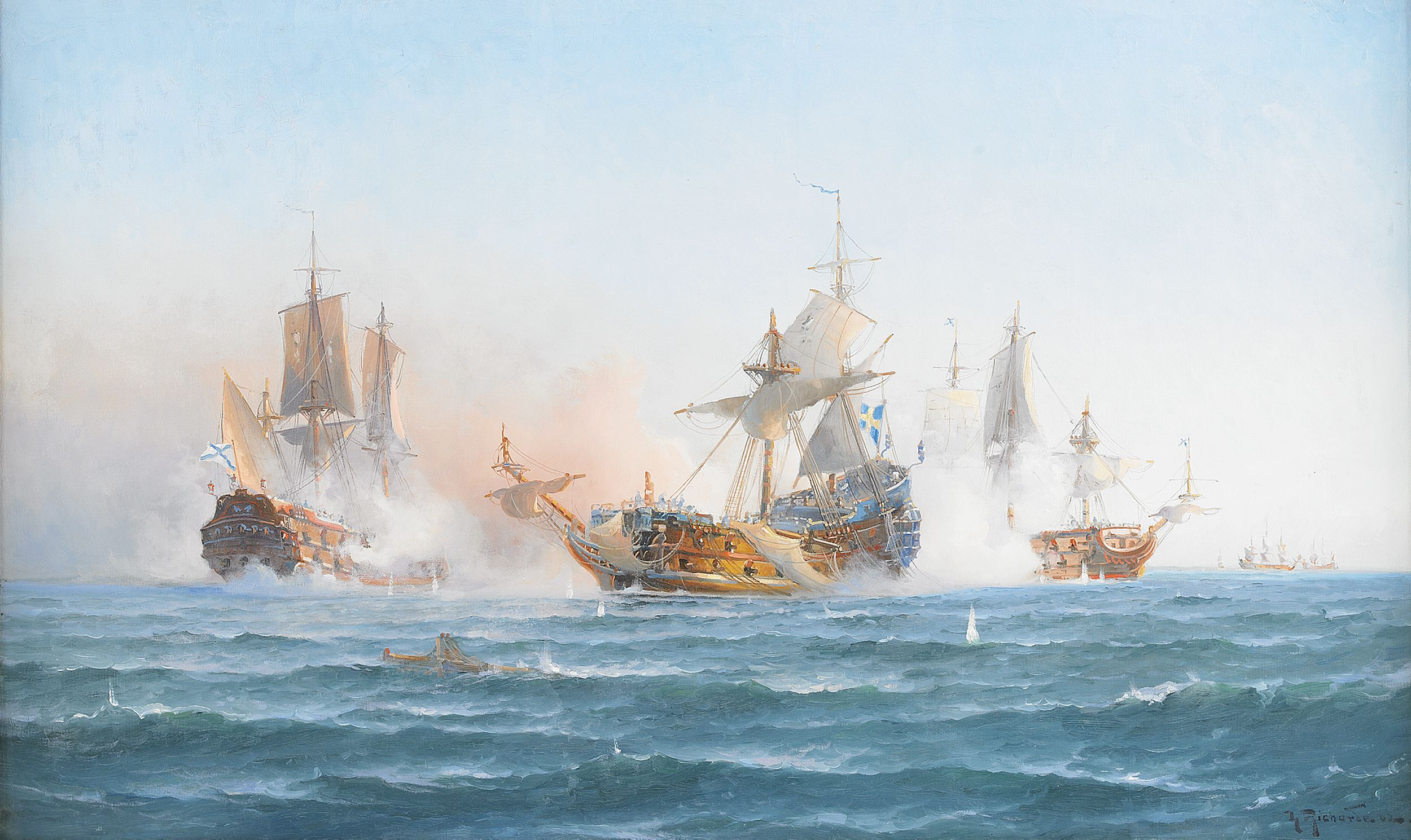
Depiction showing the Wachtmeister fighting against a Russian fleet in 1719 by Ludvig Richarde

== Action ==
In the English channel, off the coast of Sussex, a Dano-Swedish convoy fleet of 180 Swedish and Danish merchant ships, led by the Wachtmeister met an English frigate on 18 April. The English frigate, named the Seahorse began inspecting the merchant ships, and then demanded one of the ships salute it, which was promptly refused, with the answer that the ship behind it would give them the reason for it, which happened to be the Wachtmeister

When the English captain, Anthony Tollet sent his boat onboard the Wachtmeister to know the reason for the refusal to strike their sail, the Swedish captain, Gustaf Wattrang, sent his Lieutenant on board the Seahorse to tell him that the Swedes had orders to not strike to any ship in the world, especially such a "diminutive" one.

Upon hearing the reason, Tollet sent the Lieutenant back to the Wachtmeister, and told him to notify Wattrang that unless he saluted the Seahorse, he would fire his broadside cannons at the Wachtmeister. After this, the Englishmen fired two bullets at the Swedes, but only into the air.

Since the Swedes continued to refuse, Tollet did as he promised and fired a broadside at the Swedes directly aimed towards the main body of the Wachtmeister. Wattrang then directed the Wachtmeister towards the Englishmen, delivering a broadside, leading to a firefight that lasted for more than 3–4 hours.

Since the Seahorse was significantly smaller than the Wachtmeister, it was eventually forced to give up, and retreated, leaving the Dano-Swedish convoy victorious in the battle.

== Aftermath ==
After the battle, the English envoy's secretary and priest, Priest Robinson, went to Count Bengt Oxenstierna and apologised, claiming that Tollet was a "young fool who knew nothing of what he was doing".

== See also ==
- Skirmish at the Isle of Wight – 1647 naval engagement
- Anglo–Swedish skirmish (1695) – Anglo-Swedish naval skirmish
- Stockholm incident – Seizure of a Swedish ship by English ships in 1651
- Action of 10 August 1695 – 1695 naval engagement
