= Battle of Derby =

July 917 battle

- Part of the Viking invasions of England
- Derby shown within Derbyshire and England
Date	July 917 AD
Location	Derby, England
Result	Anglo-Saxon victory

Belligerents
Anglo-Saxons	Danelaw

Commanders and leaders
Aethelflaed	Unknown

Strength
1 Army	Unknown

Casualties and losses
Unknown	Unknown

In July 917, Æthelflæd launched her first offensive foray and selected the fortress at Derby as her target. At that time the local ruler had probably joined with the armies from Northampton and Leicester in a number of raids to attack Mercia. Æthelflæd took advantage of the weakened burh and successfully assaulted the town in July 917; the whole region subsequently being annexed into English Mercia.

Derby was the first of Five Danelaw Burghs to be defeated by Æthelflæd's Army in the "liberation of the Danelaw" along with, Leicester, Lincoln, Nottingham and Stamford.

The Anglo-Saxon Chronicle says that in 917 "Æthelflæd Lady of the Mercians, with God's help, before Lammas obtained the borough that is called Derby. With all that belonged to it. There were also killed four thegns who were dear to her inside the gates"

The Danes may well have established their military headquarters on the former Roman fort of Derventio. This 6-acre (24,000 m^{2}) rectangular fort would have given the burh the equivalent of c. 500 hides. Survey work was carried out at the Little Chester Site between 1986 and 1990 and notes "Refurbishments to the defences in the late Saxon period may be associated with the Danish incursions of the 9th century and Little Chester could be the site of the battle of 917"

The battle itself is not well attested to. Even the 4 thegnes who were lost during the battle are unknown. For the battle to have been lost "within the Walls of the Burgh" implies storming of the settlement - thought to have been around 1300 people at the time.

The Vikings had camped at nearby Repton in 874, and abandoned it a year later after suffering significantly from disease during their stay (leading to the discovery of a grave containing 245 bodies). By 878 Viking Raids had seized the small settlement at Derby ( at the time called by its Saxon name Northworthy) from a Weakened Mercia, setting the stage for the 917 /918 campaign to recapture the five boroughs.
