= HMS Maidstone (1693) =

History

England
- Name: HMS Maidstone
- Ordered: 21 July 1693
- Builder: Royal Dockyard, Chatham
- Launched: 31 December 1693
- Commissioned: 1 January 1694
- Fate: Sold 29 July 1714

General characteristics
- Type: 20-gun Sixth Rate
- Tons burthen: 250 36/94 bm
- Length: 94 ft 3 in (28.7 m) gundeck; 79 ft 6 in (24.2 m) keel for tonnage
- Beam: 24 ft 4 in (7.4 m) for tonnage
- Depth of hold: 10 ft 8 in (3.3 m)
- Armament: initially as ordered; 20 × sakers on wooden trucks (UD); 4 × 3-pdr on wooden trucks (QD); 1703 Establishment; 20 × 6-pdrs on wooden trucks (UD); 4 × 4-pdr on wooden trucks (QD)

HMS Maidstone was a member of the standardized 20-gun sixth rates built at the end of the 17th century. After commissioning she spent her career between Home Waters and North America with junkets to the West Indies and once to the Mediterranean. Mainly employed as a trade protection vessel. She was sold in 1714.

Maidstone was the second named vessel since it was used for a 40-gun ship launched by Mundy at Woodbridge in 1545, renamed Mary Rose in 1660 during the restoration of the Monarchy, she was captured by the French in the Atlantic on 12 July 1691.

== Construction ==
She was ordered in the First Batch of four ships from Chatham Dockyard to be built under the guidance of their Master Shipwright, Robert Lee. She was launched on 31 December 1693.

== Commissioned service ==
She was commissioned on 1 January 1694 under the command of Captain John Tuckey, RN for service in the English Channel. Captain Stephen Elliot, RN took command on 14 January 1695 with Berkley's Squadron. Captain Elliot was never a lieutenant and was appointed captain as he had escaped from a French prison with valuable information. Captain Richard Culliford, RN took command on 9 June 1695 for service with the Channel fishery. Captain Jonathan Kelling, RN took command on 3 March 1697 for service in the West Indies. He held command until his death on 20 October 1698. On 27 February 1699 she was ordered to Home Waters under the command of Captain Bennet Allen, RN.

On or about 27 June 1701 she was under the command of Commander William Fairbourne, RN for service in the Leeward Islands. He was followed by Commander Robert Coleman, RN on 10 March 1703. She moved to New York in 1705. Commander Henry Long, RN was in command on 25 September 1705 for passage to the West Indies. She was under the command of Commander George Gordon, RN in the West Indies on15 March 1708. She returned to Home Waters and joined Admiral Byng's Fleet in the Channel in 1708. She then moved on to Lisbon in October Then joined the Mediterranean convoy finally returning to New York in 1709. On 9 April 1709 Commander Richard Davies, RN took command. She returned from America in 1710. She patrolled the North Sea during 1711 thru 1712.

== Disposition ==
HMS Maidstone was sold to James Jeff for £420 (Note: A total amount accounting for inflation of approximately £70,900 in today's money.) on 29 July 1714.
