= Battle of Stamford (894) =

Saxon invasion of Stamford

- Part of the Viking invasions of England
Date	894
Location	Stamford, Lincolnshire, England
Result	Viking victory

Belligerents
Danelaw Vikings	Anglo-Saxons

Commanders and leaders
Unknown	Aethelnoth

Strength
Unknown	Unknown

Casualties and losses
Unknown	Unknown

The First Battle of Stamford occurred when West Saxon Ealdorman Aethelnoth invaded the town in the summer of 894, but it was not besieged and Danish rule was unaffected.

== See also ==
- Battle of Stamford (918)
