= England and King David I =

Relationship between England and the Scottish king

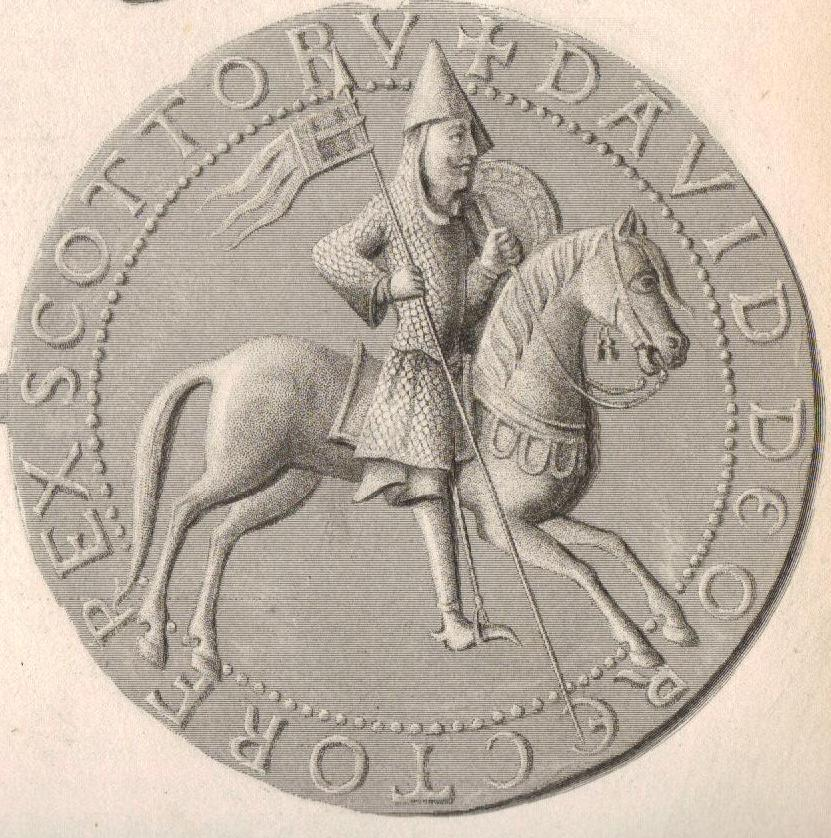
Steel engraving and enhancement of the reverse side of the Great Seal of David I, a picture in the Anglo-Continental style depicting David as a warrior leader. It is very similar to the seal of his brother, Alexander I of Scotland.

The relationship between the Kingdom of England and King David I, who was King of Scotland between 1124 and 1153, was partly shaped by David's relationship with the particular King of England, and partly by David's own ambition. David had a good relationship with and was an ally of Henry I of England, the King who was largely responsible for David's early career. After Henry's death, David upheld his support for his niece, the former Empress-consort, Matilda, and expanded his power in northern England in the process, despite his defeat at the Battle of the Standard in 1138.

== Overview ==
David's relationship with England and the English crown in these years is usually interpreted in either or both of two ways. Firstly, his actions are understood in relation to his connections with the King of England. No historian is likely to deny that David's early career was largely manufactured for him by King Henry I of England. David was the latter's "greatest protégé", one of Henry's "new men", Henry's influence had brought David his English marriage and lands, and Henry's military power had allowed David to take up his Scottish lands. David's early career can be understood as part of Henry's frontier policy, which included marriage of two daughters to the kings of Scotland and Galloway, consolidation of royal control in the north-west coast of England and the quelling of the Montgomeries, marcher lords on the Welsh borders who had been allied to Muirchertach Ua Briain, High King of Ireland (1101–19). The world of peace which David had enjoyed in England ended after the death of Henry I, just as it did for most other English magnates. His hostility to Stephen can be interpreted as an effort to uphold the intended inheritance of Henry I, the succession of his daughter, the former empress-consort Matilda. David indeed carried out his wars in her name, joined her when she arrived in England, and later knighted her son, the future Henry II.

However, David's policy towards England can be interpreted another way. David is the independence-loving king trying to build a "Scoto-Northumbrian" realm by seizing the most northerly parts of the English kingdom. In this perspective, David's support for Matilda is used as a pretext for land grabbing. David's maternal descent from the House of Wessex and his son Henry's maternal descent from the Saxon earls of Northumberland is thought to have further encouraged such a project, a project which only came to an end after Henry II ordered David's child successor Máel Coluim IV to hand over the most important of David's gains. It is clear that neither one of these interpretations can be taken without some weight being given to the other.

== Usurpation of Stephen and 1st Treaty of Durham ==
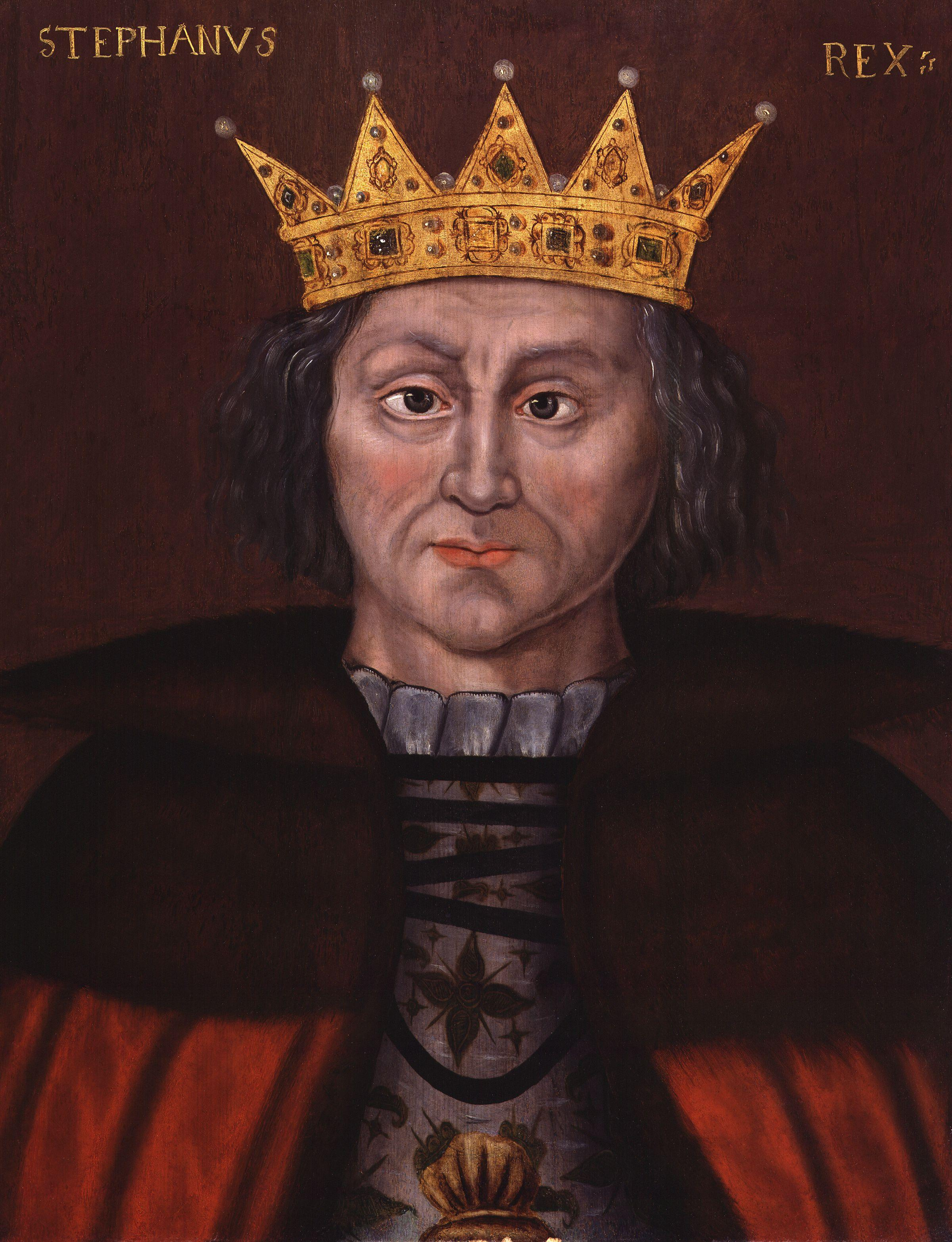
Stephen, King of the English, or Étienne de Blois in French. It was Stephen's "usurpation" that David used as "an excuse" for warring with England, if it was not the actual reason.

Henry I had arranged his inheritance to pass to his daughter Matilda, but the latter's support amongst the English and Norman magnates and barons was compromised by her marriage to Geoffrey V, count of Anjou, as the Angevins were the traditional rivals of the Normans. Instead Stephen, younger brother of Theobald, count of Blois, seized the throne. David however had been the first lay person to take the oath to uphold the succession of Matilda in 1127, and when Stephen was crowned on 22 December, David decided to make war. Before December was over, David marched into northern England, and by the end of January he had occupied the castles of Carlisle, Wark, Alnwick, Norham and Newcastle. By February David was at Durham, but was met there by an army assembled and led by King Stephen. However, rather than fight a pitched battle, a treaty was agreed whereby David would retain Carlisle while David's son Henry was re-granted the title and half the lands of the earldom of Huntingdon, which had been confiscated during David's revolt, as well as the lordship of Doncaster. On Stephen's side he received back the other castles; and while David himself would do no homage, Stephen was to receive the homage of Henry for both Carlisle and the other English territories. Stephen also gave the rather worthless but for David face-saving promise that if he ever chose to resurrect the defunct earldom of Northumberland, Henry would be given first consideration. Importantly, the issue of Matilda was not mentioned. However, the first Durham treaty quickly broke down after David took insult at the treatment of his son Henry at Stephen's court.

== Renewal of war and Clitheroe ==
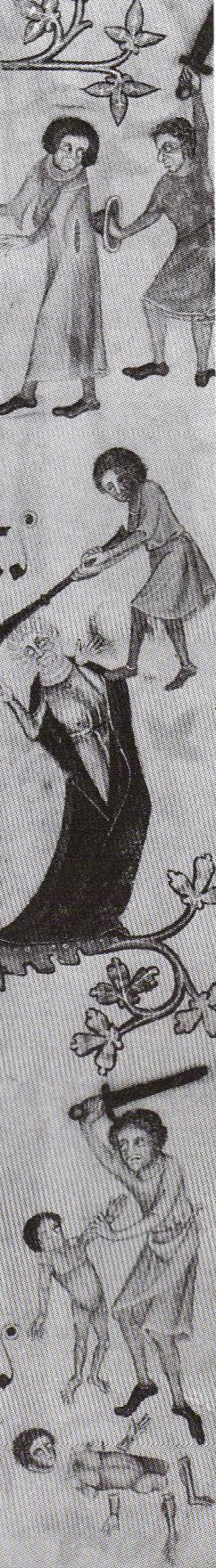
Scottish atrocities depicted on the 14th century Luttrell Psalter.

When the winter of 1136-37 was over, David once again invaded England. The King of Scots confronted a northern English army waiting for him at Newcastle. Once again, pitched battle was avoided, and a truce agreed until November. Charter evidence shows that David had gathered in Strathclyde the four most powerful magnates in Scotland, William fitz Duncan, now lord of Moray, Máel Ísu, mormaer of Strathearn, Donnchad, mormaer of Fife and Fergus, king of Galloway, along with lesser figures such as "Dufoter" of Callendar, Máel Domnaich of Scone and Gillebrígte of Stirling, probably the toísechs or "thanes" of their respective royal demesne locations. Such a huge gathering could only have been made for a military campaign. When November fell, David demanded that Stephen hand over the whole of the old earldom of Northumberland. Stephen's predictable refusal led to David's third invasion, this time in January 1138.

David advanced into the English lands taking blackmail payments from settlements and establishments that paid and plundering and burning those that did not. The army which invaded England in the January and February 1138 shocked the English chroniclers, and the shock was compounded even more by the fact that it was led by "their" David. Richard of Hexham called it "an execrable army, savager than any race of heathen yielding honour to neither God nor man" and that it "harried the whole province and slaughtered everywhere folk of either sex, of every age and condition, destroying, pillaging and burning the vills, churches and houses". Several doubtful stories of cannibalism entered the chronicle records. as well as routine enslavings and killings of churchmen, women and infants. Henry of Huntingdon wrote that the Scots:

“cleft open pregnant women, and took out the unborn babes; they tossed children upon the spear-points, and beheaded priests on altars: they cut the head of crucifixes, and placed them on the trunks of the slain; and placed the heads of the dead upon the crucifixes. Thus wherever the Scots arrived, all was full of horror and full of savagery”.

By February, King Stephen had mustered an army which marched north to deal with David. The two armies avoided each other, and Stephen was soon on the road back into the south. In the summer, David split his army into two forces, sending William fitz Duncan to march into Lancashire, where he harried Furness and Craven. On 10 June, William fitz Duncan was met by force of knights and men-at-arms. A pitched battle took place, the battle of Clitheroe, and the result was that the English army was routed.

== Battle of the Standard ==
By later July the two Scottish armies had reunited on the far side of the river Tyne in "St Cuthbert's land", that is, in the lands controlled by the Bishop of Durham. Another English army had mustered to meet the Scots, led by William, Earl of Aumale. The victory at Clitheroe was probably what inspired David to risk battle. David's force, apparently 26,000 strong and several times larger than the English army, met the English on 22 August on Cowdon Moor near Northallerton, North Yorkshire. Many of David's Norman vassals abandoned him at this point, perhaps shocked by the king's huge "barbarian" army, but more likely compromised by dual loyalty to King Stephen and David. Robert de Brus and Bernard de Balliol, two of these men, approached the king's camp and tried to plead with him. According to Ailred of Rievaulx, Robert de Brus protested to David,

"Against whom today dost thou bear arms today and lead this huge army? Against the English, truly, and the Normans. O King, are not these they with whom, thou hast ever found useful counsel and ready help, and willing obedience besides? Since when, my lord, I ask thee hast thou found such faith in Scots that thou dost with such confidence divest and deprive thyself and thine of the counsel of the English, and the help of the Normans, as if the Scots would suffice alone for thee even against the Scots? New to thee is this confidence in Galwegians, attacking with arms today those by whose aid hitherto thou hast ruled the Scots with affection [and] the Galwegians with terror".

According to the sources a dispute erupted in among David's army about who would fill the front line. The decision by David to put his small French contingent in the front line was resented by the "Galwegians", perhaps a term used for Gaels from Scotland south of the Forth rather than just from Galloway. Ailred of Rievaulx reports that the protests were led by Máel Ísu, mormaer of Strathearn, reportedly saying to the king "why is it, O King, that thou reliest rather upon the will of Galli, since none of them with their arms today will advance before me, unarmed in the battle?", and the Scots pointed out that already ""we gained at Clitheroe a victory over mail-clad men" in an effort to convince David of their better worthiness. Despite the protests of David's Norman followers, David apparently had to yield, and he gave the Galwegians the honour of filing the front of the four Scottish lines. Behind the Galwegians were the men from David's former principality in southern Scotland, led by Prince Henry and David's Northumbrian ally Eustace fitz John. The third line was taken by the Hebrideans, Argyllmen and men of Lothian, and the forth and biggest line was taken up by the men of Scotland-proper, with David in personal command. The English on the other hand were massed into one dense column around a detached ship's mast topped with religious banners, giving to the battle its most famous name, i.e. "the battle of the Standard".

The battle soon got underway. Henry of Huntingdon tells us that "the Scots cried out the warcry of their fathers - and the shout rose even to the skies - Albanaich, Albanaich!" and charged the massed Anglo-Norman line. The cry, meaning "Men of Scotland", had been used by the Scots at the battle of Corbridge in 908. Ailred described the same charge, saying that the first line

"after their custom gave vent thrice to a yell of horrible sound, and attacked the southerns in such an onslaught that they compelled the first spearmen to forsake their post; but they were driven off again by the strength of the knights, and [the spearmen] recovered their courage and strength against the foe. And when the frailty of the Scottish lances was mocked by the denseness of iron and wood they drew their swords and attempted to contend at close quarters"

As the Scots were engaging in this close combat, Ailred tells us that the English archers began to fire on the Scottish line, causing extreme disarray and lose of life. The suicidal bravery and endurance of the Galwegians, and the lack of Norman-style armour which Máel Ísu and the Scots had allegedly been so boastful of, was mocked by Ailred:

"like a hedgehog with its quill, so would you see a Galwegian bristling all round with arrows, and none theless brandishing his sword, and in blind madness rushing forward now smite a foe, now lash the air with useless stokes".

Despite this attack, the battle continued. Ailred tells us the force of David's son Henry managed to route its opponents. According to Henry of Huntingdon, though, the battle turned when the "chief of the men of Lothian", probably Cospatric II, earl of Dunbar, was struck by an arrow. The men of Lothian apparently fled first; and after a while, Ailred tells us the Galwegians followed suit when Domnall and Ulgric, two of their captains, were slain. John of Hexham tells us that the battle lasted three hours.

== 2nd Treaty of Durham ==
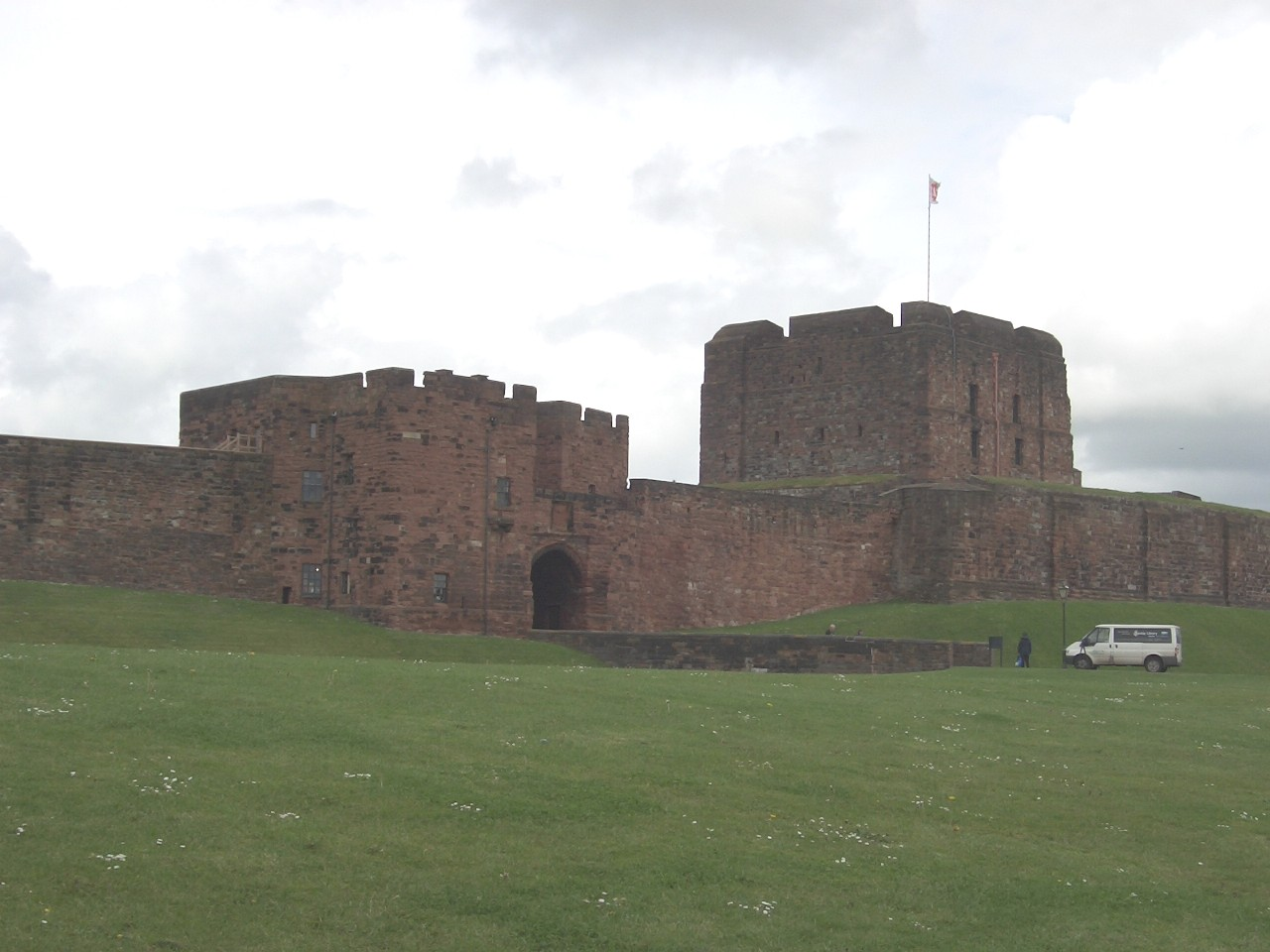
Carlisle Castle was rebuilt by King David, and became one of his chief residences.

After the battle, David and his surviving notables retired to Carlisle. Although the result was a defeat, it was not by any means a decisive nor even devastating defeat. David retained the bulk of his army and thus the power to go on the offensive again. The siege of Wark, for instance, which had been going on since January, continued to go on until it was captured in November. David continued to occupy Cumberland and much of Northumberland. On 26 September Cardinal Alberic of Ostia arrived at Carlisle where David had called together his kingdom's nobles, abbots and bishops. Alberic was there to investigate the controversy over the issue of the bishop of Glasgow's allegiance or non-allegiance to the archbishop of York. However, Alberic also played a role as peace-broker. With Alberic acting as a go-between, David agreed to a six-week truce which excluded the siege of Wark. Negotiations between David and Stephen continued over the winter months, but on 9 April David and Stephen's wife Matilda of Boulogne met each other at Durham and agreed a settlement. David's son Henry was given the earldom of Northumberland and was restored to the earldom of Huntingdon and lordship of Doncaster; David himself was allowed to keep Carlisle and Cumberland. However, King Stephen was to retain possession of the strategically vital castles of Bamburgh and Newcastle, and Prince Henry was to perform homage for his English lands, while David himself was to promise to "remain loyal" to Stephen at all times. The last conditions aside, this effectively fulfilled all of David's war aims. Thus, despite the surprising victory of the outnumbered English army in North Yorkshire, the series of invasions that David led into England since the death of his patron Henry at the end of 1135 had resulted in a significantly expanded kingdom. David, moreover, was no longer in practice a sub-king. So if King Henry's life and reign had brought David all his fortune, Henry's death had brought David even more.

== Arrival of Matilda and the renewal of conflict ==
The settlement with Stephen was not set to last long. The arrival in England of the Empress Matilda, claimant to the English throne, gave David an opportunity to renew the conflict with Stephen. When Stephen was captured by the Matilda's forces on 2 February 1141, David finally decided to disregard his agreement with Stephen and seek the support of Matilda. In either May or June, David travelled to the south of England to enter Matilda's company, and was present for her expected but aborted coronation at Westminster Abbey. David was there until September when the Empress found herself surrounded at Winchester. This civil war, or "the Anarchy" as it was later called, enabled David to strengthen his own position in northern England. While David consolidated his hold on his own and his son's newly acquired lands, he also sought to expand his influence. The castles at Newcastle and Bamburgh were again brought under his control, and he attained dominion over all of England north-west of the River Ribble and Pennines, while holding the north-east as far south as the River Tyne, on the borders of the core territory of the bishopric of Durham. While his son brought all the senior barons of Northumberland into his entourage, David rebuilt the fortress of Carlisle. Carlisle quickly began replacing Roxburgh as his favoured residence. David's acquisition of the mines at Alston on the South Tyne enabled him to begin minting the Kingdom of Scotland's first silver coinage. David, meanwhile, issued charters to Shrewsbury Abbey in respect to their lands in Lancashire.

== Bishopric of Durham and the Archbishopric of York ==
However, David's successes were in many ways balanced by his failures. David's greatest disappointment during this time was his inability to ensure control of the bishopric of Durham and the archbishopric of York. David had attempted to appoint his chancellor, William Comyn, to the bishopric of Durham, which had been vacant since the death of Bishop Geoffrey in 1140. Between 1141 and 1143, Comyn was the de facto bishop, and had control of the bishop's castle; but he was resented by the chapter. Despite controlling the town of Durham, David's only hope of ensuring his election and consecration was gaining the support of the Papal legate, Henry of Blois, bishop of Winchester and brother of King Stephen. Despite obtaining the support of the Empress Matilda, David was unsuccessful and had given up by the time William de St Barbara was elected to the see in 1143. David also attempted to interfere in the succession to the archbishopric of York. William FitzHerbert, nephew of King Stephen, found his position undermined by the collapsing political fortune of Stephen in the north of England, and was deposed by the pope. David used his Cistercian connections to build a bond with Henry Murdac, the new archbishop. Despite the support of Pope Eugenius III, supporters of King Stephen and William FitzHerbert managed to prevent Henry taking up his post at York. By 1149, Henry had sought the support of David. David seized on the opportunity to bring the archdiocese under Scottish control, and marched on the city. However, Stephen's supporters had gotten wind of the plan, and informed King Stephen. Stephen therefore marched to the city and installed a new garrison. David decided not to risk such an engagement and withdrew. Richard Oram has conjectured that David's ultimate aim was to bring the whole of the ancient kingdom of Northumbria into his dominion. For Oram, this event was the turning point, "the chance to radically redraw the political map of the British Isles lost forever".
