= Battle of Stamford (918) =

- Part of the Viking invasions of England
Date	May 918
Location	Stamford, Lincolnshire, England
Result	Anglo-Saxon victory

Belligerents
Anglo-Saxons	Vikings

Commanders and leaders
King Edward	Unknown

Strength
Unknown	Unknown

Casualties and losses
Unknown	Unknown

The Second Battle of Stamford occurred when King Edward assaulted Stamford in late May 918. It soon fell to his army of Wessex. Later that year, Edward built a second burh on the south side of the River Welland. The ramparts of the northern burh may have been approximately 3100 ft (c. 750 hides) from Roffe, and the Edwardian burh around 2700 ft (c. 650 hides).

== See also ==
- Battle of Stamford (894)
