= Battle of Orford Ness (1704) =

1704 battle of the Great Northern War

- Part of the Great Northern War
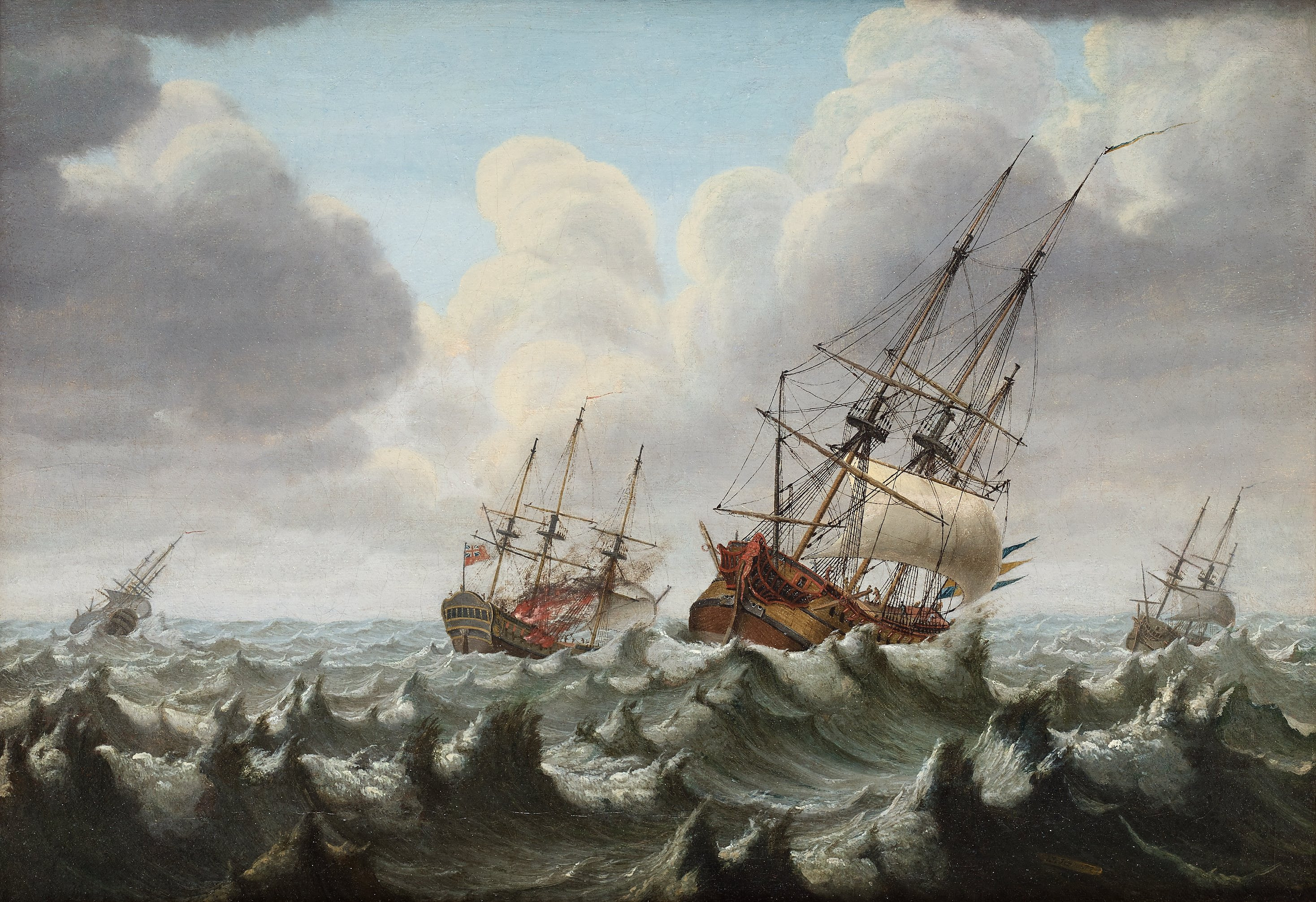
- Battle of Orford Ness; Johan Tietrich Schoultz
Date	7 August 1704
Location	Off Orford Ness, English Channel 52°02′46″N 1°44′38″E
Result	English victory

Belligerents
England	Sweden

Commanders and leaders
William Whetstone	Gustaf von Psilander (POW)

Strength
8 ships of the line 1 frigate	1 ship of the line

Casualties and losses
100 killed or wounded	53 killed or wounded 1 ship of the line captured

The Battle of Orford Ness was fought between a southbound Swedish merchant convoy escorted by the 56-gun ship of the line Öland and an English squadron of eight ships of the line and a frigate off Orford Ness on 7 August 1704. The English squadron, under Rear-admiral William Whetstone, began following the convoy upon sighting it. When Whetstone caught up with the Swedes, he demanded they salute his ships as the Swedish convoy was in English waters. Öland's captain, Gustaf von Psilander, under strict orders from Charles XII of Sweden not to salute to foreign ships first, refused and sent his 30 year old lieutenant Herman Schmidt in the gig to the English command ship, and according to von Psilander the following conversation ensued between Herman and the english captain Thomas Butler;

– Do You not see the Flag of the Queen of England?
– We see it, but do You not see the flag of the King of Sweden?
– We do, but why do You not fulfill Your obligation to the Queen of England?
– What obligation does the King of Sweden owe the Queen of England?
– You must lower your topsails.
– My commander have been given no such orders, and he will not lower them.
– Well, I shall teach You this presently.

A four-hour battle ensued, during which the English suffered 100 men killed or wounded while the Swedish suffered 53.

The heavily damaged Öland eventually tied her flag in schau, which meant it was tied up in the middle and couldn't blow freely, this was at the time the optical signal för distress at sea. The Öland was boarded and the English ships came alongside the merchant ships she was convoying. But tieing the flag in schau, von Psilander had avoided striking her colours. The Swedish Board of Admiralty and Board of Trade refused to demand his release or support Psilander while he was in captivity, but Charles XII successfully demanded the English release both Öland and her crew. Psilander, his crew, and the convoyed ships were subsequently released and returned to Sweden. However, Öland sank north of Denmark while homeward bound.

== Gallery ==
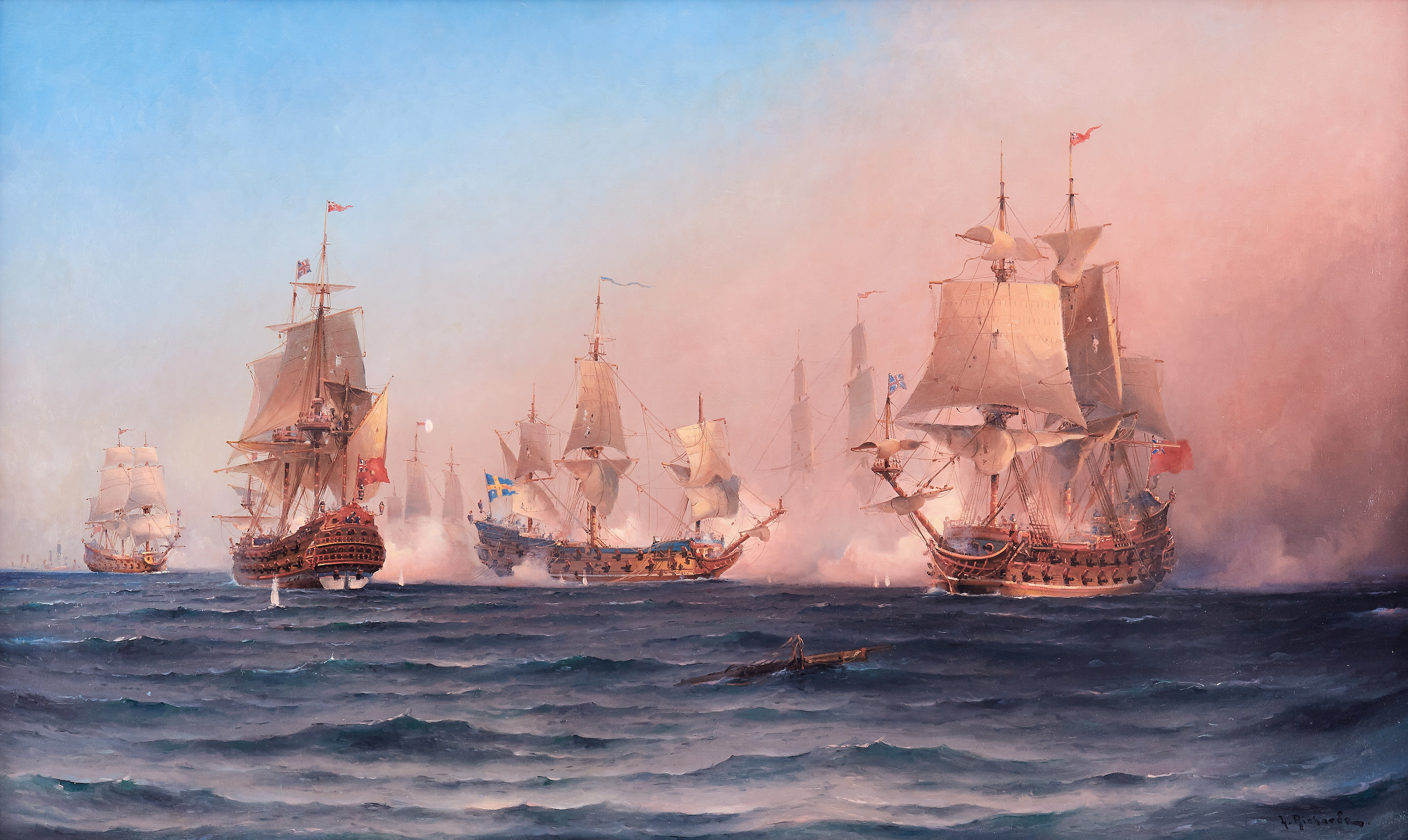
Painting of the battle by Ludvig Richarde

Painting of the battle by Albert Berg

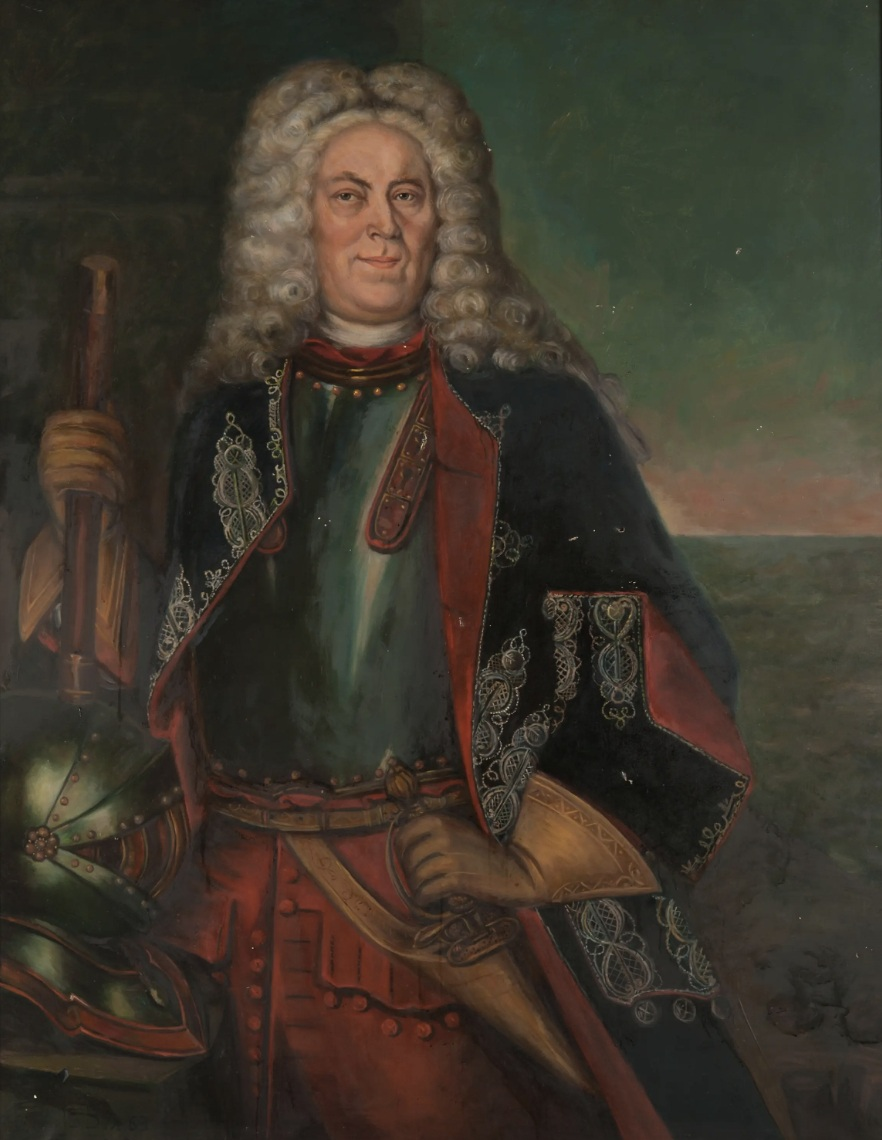
Portrait of von Psilander attributed to David Klöcker Ehrenstrahl

Psilander's coat of arms, which were awarded to him after the battle

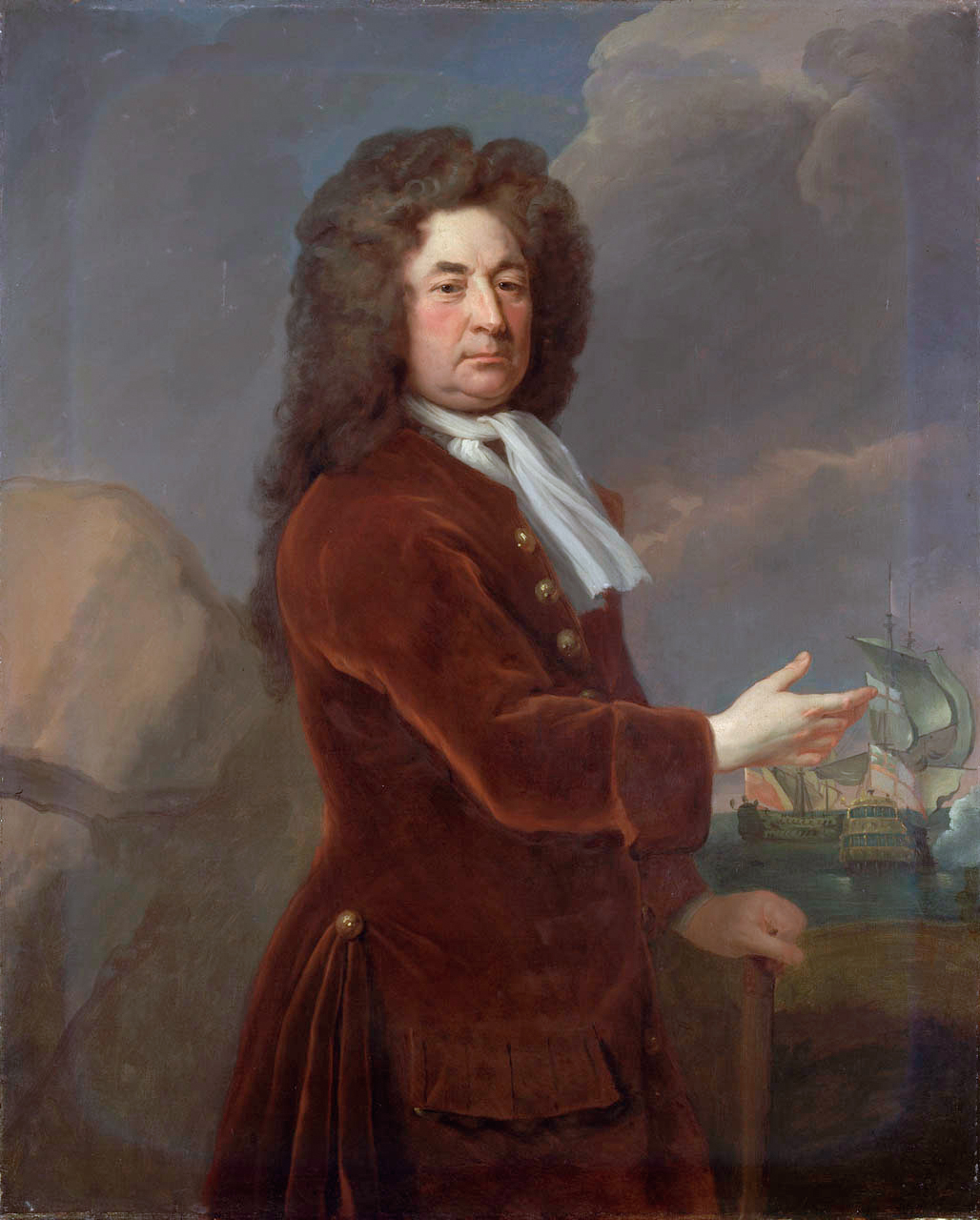
c. 1707 portrait of Whetstone by Michael Dahl
