= List of wars involving the United Kingdom in the 21st century =

This is a list of military conflicts, involving the United Kingdom in the 21st century.

This is part of a larger series of list articles that cover the various wars involving the United Kingdom and the Kingdom of Great Britain. Notable militarised interstate disputes are included. For a list of wars before the Acts of Union 1707 merging the Kingdom of England and Scotland, please see List of wars involving England & List of wars involving Scotland. For a list of wars involving the predecessors of both states and a broader list of wars fought on the Island of Great Britain, see the list of wars in Great Britain.

- List of wars involving the United Kingdom
  - List of wars involving the Kingdom of Great Britain in the 18th century
  - List of wars involving the United Kingdom in the 19th century
  - List of wars involving the United Kingdom in the 20th century
  - List of wars involving the United Kingdom in the 21st century

For the criteria of what may be permitted on this list, see List of wars involving the United Kingdom.

== Key ==
British victory
Another result (Note: for example a treaty or peace without a clear result, status quo ante bellum, result of civil or internal conflict, result unknown or indecisive, inconclusive)
British defeat
Ongoing conflict

== List ==
Conflict	Allies	Opponent(s)	Outcome
Sierra Leone Civil War (1991–2002)	Sierra Leone; United Kingdom	Revolutionary United Front; Liberia; Armed Forces Revolutionary Council West Side Boys	British allied victory Rebels defeated.
War in Afghanistan (2001–2021)	Islamic Republic of Afghanistan United States; United Kingdom; Canada; Germany; Italy; France; Denmark; Poland; Romania; Turkey; Australia; Spain; Netherlands; International Security Assistance Force	(Afghanistan) Taliban; Al-Qaeda	Inconclusive or other outcome: The Taliban militia, overthrown in 2001.; British withdrawal in 2014.; Taliban regained power on 15 August 2021, after 20 years of NATO deployment.
Iraq War (2003–2011)	Republic of Iraq United States; United Kingdom; Australia; Poland; Denmark; Iraqi Kurdistan	Ba'athist Iraq Al-Qaeda in Iraq; Islamic State of Iraq	British allied victory: Overthrow of Ba'ath Party government.; Occupation of southern Iraq.; Iraqi insurgency, emergence of al-Qaeda in Iraq, and civil war in Iraq (2006–07).; Rise and defeat of the Islamic State, the successor of al-Qaeda in Iraq.
Somali Civil War (2009–present) (1991–present)	Somalia; United States; China; United Kingdom; France; Italy; Russia; Turkey; UAE AUSSOM (2025–present): Burundi (under discussion); Djibouti; Egypt (under discussion); Ethiopia; Kenya; Uganda	Al-Qaeda; Al-Shabaab and allies; Somaliland Armed Forces and allies	Ongoing: Somalian military takes at least a third of Al-Shabaab territory in 2022.; Ongoing constitutional crisis in Somalia since 2023.; Jubaland crisis since 2024.
Operation Ocean Shield (2009–2016)	NATO: United States; Belgium; Canada; Denmark; Germany; Greece; Italy; Netherlands; Norway; Portugal; Spain; Turkey; United Kingdom; Non-NATO forces: Australia; China; Colombia; India; Indonesia; Japan; Malaysia; New Zealand; Oman; Pakistan; Peru; Philippines; Russia; Saudi Arabia; Seychelles; Singapore; South Africa; South Korea; Taiwan; Thailand; Ukraine; Yemen	Somalian pirates	British allied victory: The anti-piracy operation follows the earlier NATO Operation Allied Protector.; NATO's contribution to Operation Enduring Freedom – Horn of Africa.; Number of pirate attacks dramatically decreased.; Piracy drops 90 % in 2013.; Action of 11 November 2008.
First Libyan Civil War (2011)	Many NATO members acting under (United Nations) UN mandate, including: United States; United Kingdom; France; Denmark; Italy; Canada and (Libya) Anti-Gaddafi forces several Arab League states Sweden	(Libya) Libyan Arab Jamahiriya (Libya) Pro-Gaddafi forces	British allied victory: Fall of the Libyan Arab Jamahiriya.; Muammar Gaddafi killed.; National Transitional Council takes control.
Operation Shader (2014–present)	Iraq; Iraqi Kurdistan; Ba'athist Syria; Syria; Rojava; United States; United Kingdom; Australia; Belgium; Canada; Denmark; France; Germany; Italy; Netherlands; New Zealand; Norway; Portugal; Spain; Turkey; Bahrain; Jordan; Morocco; Qatar; Saudi Arabia; United Arab Emirates; Egypt; Libya; Nigeria; Cameroon; Chad; Niger; Russia	Islamic State	Ongoing: The UK's Operation Shader is ongoing as part of the war against the Islamic State.; Over 3 000 IS fighters killed in 1 700 British airstrikes.; Ongoing operations by British special forces in Syria.; British military provides materiel and training to the Iraqi military.; IS loses all territory in Iraq in December 2017 and Syria in March 2019.
Operation Prosperity Guardian (2023–2025) Part of the Red Sea crisis, Middle Eastern crisis, and the Yemeni Civil War	United States; United Kingdom; Australia; New Zealand; Canada; Denmark; Greece; Netherlands; Norway; Bahrain; Singapore; Sri Lanka	(Yemen) Supreme Political Council: Houthi movement	Inconclusive or other outcome: US-led multinational coalition formed in December 2023 to respond to attacks on shipping in the Red Sea.; Two phases of US–UK airstrikes on Yemen.
Operation Southern Spear (2025–present) Part of the Crisis in Venezuela	United States; United Kingdom; Dominican Republic; Trinidad and Tobago; El Salvador; Argentina	Venezuela; Cuba; Colombia; Russia	Ongoing: Capture of President Nicholas Maduro.; Seizure of "shadow fleet" oil tankers.

== See also ==
- Declaration of war by the United Kingdom
- Military history of the United Kingdom
- British Armed Forces
- List of British military installations
