= List of wars involving the United Kingdom in the 19th century =

This is a list of military conflicts, involving the United Kingdom in the 19th century.

This is part of a larger series of list articles that cover the various wars involving the United Kingdom and the Kingdom of Great Britain. Notable militarised interstate disputes are included. For a list of wars before the Acts of Union 1707 merging the Kingdom of England and Scotland, please see List of wars involving England & List of wars involving Scotland. For a list of wars involving the predecessors of both states and a broader list of wars fought on the Island of Great Britain, see the list of wars in Great Britain.

- List of wars involving the United Kingdom
  - List of wars involving the Kingdom of Great Britain in the 18th century
  - List of wars involving the United Kingdom in the 19th century
  - List of wars involving the United Kingdom in the 20th century
  - List of wars involving the United Kingdom in the 21st century

For the criteria of what may be permitted on this list, see List of wars involving the United Kingdom.

== Key ==
British victory
Another result (Note: for example a treaty or peace without a clear result, status quo ante bellum, result of civil or internal conflict, result unknown or indecisive, inconclusive)
British defeat

== 19th-century wars ==
Conflict	Allies	Opponent(s)	Outcome
Temne War (1801–1807)	United Kingdom Susu tribes	Kingdom of Koya	British–allied victory: Northern shore of Sierra Leone ceded by Koya
Second Anglo-Maratha War (1802–1805)	East India Company	Maratha Empire	British victory: Extensive territory in India ceded by the Maratha Empire
First Kandyan War (1803–1805)	United Kingdom	Kandy	British victory: Territory captured from Kandy
Irish rebellion of 1803 (1803)	United Kingdom	United Irishmen	British victory: Rebellion defeated
British Expedition to Ceylon (1803)	Dutch Republic; United Kingdom	Chiefdom of Vanni; Kingdom of Kandy	British Allied victory: Vanni region lost to the British; The last Tamil resistance against colonial rule was crushed.
War of the Third Coalition (1805–1806)	Austrian Empire Russian Empire (Kingdom of the Two Sicilies) Naples and Sicily; Portugal; Sweden	(First French Empire) French Empire (Batavian Republic) Batavia (Kingdom of Italy (Napoleonic)) Italy (Kingdom of Italy (Napoleonic)) Etruria; Spain; Bavaria (Kingdom of Württemberg) Württemberg	French Allied victory: Fourth Peace of Preßburg: French victory; Austria surrenders to France; Pro-French Confederation of the Rhine formed
Vellore Mutiny (1806)	East India Company	Indian rebels	British victory
War of the Fourth Coalition (1806–1807)	Prussia Russia; Saxony; Sweden (Kingdom of the Two Sicilies) Sicily	(First French Empire) French Empire Confederation of the Rhine: Bavaria; Württemberg; Polish Legions (Kingdom of Italy (Napoleonic)) Italy (Kingdom of the Two Sicilies) Naples (Kingdom of Italy (Napoleonic)) Etruria (Netherlands) Holland (Switzerland) Swiss Confederation; Spain	French Allied victory Treaties of Tilsit: French victory; Half of Prussia ceded to French allies; Russia exits the war; Anglo-Russian War begins
Ashanti–Fante War (1806–1807)	Fante Confederacy; United Kingdom	Ashanti Empire Dutch Empire	Dutch victory
Anglo-Turkish War (1807–1809)	United Kingdom	Ottoman Empire	Disputed: Treaty of the Dardanelles; Commercial and legal concessions to British interests within the Ottoman Empire; Promise to protect the empire against French encroachment
Froberg mutiny (1807)	United Kingdom	Froberg Regiment mutineers	British victory
Gunboat War (1807–1814)	United Kingdom	Denmark–Norway	British victory: Treaty of Kiel; Denmark and Norway split up; Heligoland ceded from Denmark
Anglo-Russian War (1807–1812)	United Kingdom	Russian Empire	Inconclusive or other outcome: Treaty of Örebro; Anglo-Russian-Swedish pact against France
Peninsular War (1807–1814)	Spain Portugal; United Kingdom	(First French Empire) French Empire; Napoleonic Spain; Kingdom of Italy; Kingdom of Holland; Duchy of Warsaw; Swiss Confederation; Confederation of the Rhine	British Allied victory: Treaty of Paris; Bourbon dynasty restored; Tobago, St. Lucia, Mauritius ceded from France; All other French possessions restored as per 1792 borders; Abolition of French Slave Trade; Swiss independence
Travancore Rebellion (1808–1809)	East India Company	Travancore; Kingdom of Cochin	British victory
War of the Fifth Coalition (1809)	Austrian Empire; United Kingdom; Spain; Kingdom of Portugal; Tyrol; Hungary (Kingdom of Prussia) Black Brunswickers (Kingdom of the Two Sicilies) Sicily; Sardinia	(First French Empire) French Empire; Russian Empire Warsaw; Confederation of the Rhine: Bavaria; Saxony; Württemberg; (Kingdom of Westphalia) Westphalia; (Kingdom of Italy (Napoleonic)) Kingdom of Italy; Naples (Switzerland) Swiss Confederation (Netherlands) Holland	French–allied victory: Treaty of Schönbrunn: Complete Austrian surrender; Peninsular War continued
Jørgen Jørgensen's Revolution (1809)	United Kingdom Denmark-Norway	Icelandic Revolutionaries	British Allied victory
Persian Gulf campaign of 1809 (1809)	United Kingdom	Al Qasimi	British victory
Fourth Xhosa War (1811–1812)	United Kingdom; Cape Colony	Xhosa tribes	British victory Xhosa tribes pushed beyond the Fish River, reversing their gains in the previous Xhosa wars
War of 1812 (1812–1815)	United Kingdom: (United Kingdom of Great Britain and Ireland) British North America; Tecumseh's confederacy	United States	Inconclusive or other outcome Treaty of Ghent; Status quo ante bellum with no boundary changes: United States invasions of British Canada repulsed. All Pre-War borders restored under the Treaty of Ghent; British invasions of the United States repulsed. All pre-war borders restored under the Treaty of Ghent
Sack of Yogyakarta (1812)	United Kingdom; Mangkunegaran	Yogyakarta Sultanate	British Allied victory
Sambas expeditions (1812–1813)	United Kingdom	Sultanate of Sambas	British victory
War of the Sixth Coalition (1812–1814)	Original Coalition; Russian Empire; Prussia; Austrian Empire; United Kingdom; Sweden; Spain; Portugal; Two Sicilies; Kingdom of Sardinia After Battle of Leipzig: Saxony; Bavaria; Württemberg; United Netherlands	First French Empire: Napoleonic Italy; Kingdom of Naples; Duchy of Warsaw (Note: Duchy of Warsaw as a state was in effect fully occupied by Russian and Prussian forces by May 1813, though most Poles remained loyal to Napoleon.); Until January 1814: Denmark–Norway; Confederation of the Rhine (Many member states defected after Battle of Leipzig)	British–allied victory: Coalition victory, Treaty of Fontainebleau, First Treaty of Paris; Bourbon Restoration; Napoleon's exile to Elba; Various territorial changes; Beginning of the Congress of Vienna; Hostilities resume with the return of Napoleon to power in 1815
Kedopok War (1813)	United Kingdom	Peasant rebels	British victory
British expedition to Makassar (1814)	United Kingdom	Bone State	British victory
Anglo-Nepalese War (1814–1816)	East India Company	Kingdom of Nepal	British victory: Treaty of Sugauli
Second Kandyan War (1815)	United Kingdom	Kandy	British victory Kandyan Convention: Dissolution of the Kandy royal line; British King declared King of Kandy
Hundred Days (1815) War of the Seventh Coalition	United Kingdom Prussia; France; Hanover; German Confederation; Austria; Russia; Sweden; Netherlands; Spain; Portugal; Sardinia; Kingdom of the Two Sicilies; Tuscany	(France) French Empire Naples	British–allied victory Treaty of Paris: General French defeat; Restoration of the House of Bourbon; Abolition of the slave trade (all signatories); ₣100,000,000 compensation from France
Slachter's Nek Rebellion (1815)	United Kingdom	Boer rebels	British victory
Bussa's Rebellion (1816)	United Kingdom	Rebel slaves	British victory
Bombardment of Algiers (1816)	United Kingdom; Netherlands	Regency of Algiers	British–allied victory
Uva-Wellassa Rebellion (1817–1818)	United Kingdom	Kandyan rebels	British victory
Third Anglo-Maratha War (1817–1818)	East India Company	Maratha Empire	British victory: Virtually all territory south of the Sutlej River controlled by Britain
Paika Rebellion (1817–1818)	East India Company	Bhoi dynasty	British victory: End of Paika rule; East India Company establishes rule over Odisha and the Paikas
Fifth Xhosa War (1818–1819)	United Kingdom; Khoekhoe; Ngqika	Xhosa tribes	British–allied victory
Persian Gulf campaign of 1819 (1819)	United Kingdom; Omani Empire	Emirate of Ras Al Khaimah: Al Qasimi	British victory: General Maritime Treaty of 1820
Greek War of Independence (1821–1829): Battle of Navarino	1821: Filiki Eteria; Greek revolutionaries After 1822: Hellenic Republic Supported by: Romanian Revolutionaries (1821); (Greece) Philhellenes; United Kingdom (after 1826); Russian Empire (after 1826); Kingdom of France (after 1826); Serb and Montenegrin volunteers	Ottoman Empire: Egypt; Algeria; Tripolitania; Tunis	British–allied victory: First Hellenic Republic established and recognized
Demerara rebellion of 1823 (1823)	United Kingdom	Rebel slaves	British victory
First Anglo-Ashanti War (1823–1831)	British Empire	Ashanti Empire	British victory
Bathurst War (1824)	United Kingdom	Wiradjuri	British victory
First Anglo-Burmese War (1824–1826)	East India Company Native tribes	Burmese Empire	British–allied victory Treaty of Yandabo: Assam, Manipur, Rakhine, and Taninthayi coast south of Salween river ceded from Burma; £1,000,000 compensation from Burma
Siege of Bharatpur (1825–1826)	East India Company	Bharatpur State	British victory
British attack on Berbera (1827)	United Kingdom: Royal Navy; East India Company	Isaaq Sultanate: Habr Awal	British–allied victory: Destruction of large parts of Berbera; Indemnity agreed upon for 1825 Habr Awal attack; Crucial caravan trade halted temporarily
Liberal Wars (1828–1834)	Liberals; Spain (1833–1834); United Kingdom; France (1832–1834)	Miguelites; Spain (1832–1833); Russia; Papal States	Liberal–allied victory: Concession of Evoramonte
Revolt of the Mercenaries (1828)	(Empire of Brazil) Brazil; United Kingdom; France	(Germany) German Mercenaries (Republic of Ireland) Irish Mercenaries	British–allied victory: Mutiny suppressed
Black War (1828–1832)	United Kingdom; Van Diemen's Land; Van Diemen's Land Company	Aboriginal Tasmanians	British victory
Ahom Rebellion (1828)	East India Company	Ahom dynasty	British victory
Titumir Rebellion (1830–1831)	East India Company	Tariqah-i-Muhammadiya	British victory
Bathurst Rebellion (1830)	United Kingdom	Bushrangers	British victory
Naning War (1831–1832)	East India Company	Naning	British victory
Barra War (1831–1832)	United Kingdom	Kingdom of Niumi	Inconclusive
Baptist War (1831–1832)	United Kingdom; Colony of Jamaica	Rebel slaves	British victory: Slave defeat; Rebellion suppressed
Reassertion of British sovereignty over the Falkland Islands (1832–1833)	United Kingdom	United Provinces of the Río de la Plata	British victory: British control of the Falkland Islands
First Carlist War (1833–1840)	(Spain) Forces of Queen Isabella II (France) French Kingdom (Portugal) Forces of Queen Maria II (United Kingdom of Great Britain and Ireland) Auxiliary Legion	Carlists: Forces of Infante Carlos; Forces of King Miguel	Inconclusive or other outcome: British withdrawal before the war's conclusion; British mediated Convention of Vergara
Coorg War (1834)	East India Company	Kingdom of Coorg	British victory
Sixth Xhosa War (1834–1836)	(United Kingdom) Free Khoikhoi	Xhosa tribes	British victory: Extensive territorial gains from Xhosa
St. Joseph Mutiny (1837)	United Kingdom	1st West India Regiment mutineers	British victory
Rebellions of 1837–1838 (1837–1838)	United Kingdom; Province of Upper Canada (United Kingdom) Province of Lower Canada: British Loyalists	Patriotes; Hunters' Lodges; Reform movement	British victory: Patriote rebellion crushed by loyalist forces; Republic of Canada dismantled; Defeat of Hunters' Lodges; Unification of Upper and Lower Canada into the Province of Canada
Battle of Bossenden Wood (1838)	United Kingdom	Followers of John Nichols Thom	British victory
First Anglo-Afghan War (1838–1842)	East India Company; Durrani Kingdom; Maimana Khanate; Khulm (August 1840 for mere days, September 1840-November 1841); Sadozai loyalists	Emirate of Kabul; Principality of Qandahar; Khanate of Kalat; Khulm (August 1840, November 1841 onwards.); Marri; Bugti; Afghan Tribes; Barakzai Loyalists	Barakzai Afghan victory: British retreat from Afghanistan
Uruguayan Civil War (1839–1851)	Colorados; Gobierno de la Defensa (since 1843); Unitarians (or anti-rosists); Corrientes (from 1839); Entre Ríos (from 1851); Santa Fe (from 1851); Empire of Brazil (since 1851); France; United Kingdom of Great Britain and Ireland; Riograndense Republic (1839–1845); Italian Redshirts	Blancos: Gobierno del Cerrito (since 1843); Federalists; Lavallejistas; Argentine Confederation (since 1839) Entre Ríos (until 1851)	Colorado victory: The Colorado Party triumphs in Uruguay.; In Argentina, Rosas is overthrown by Urquiza in the Battle of Caseros.; Argentine Unification War.
Aden Expedition (1839)	United Kingdom	Lahej	British victory Port of Aden ceded to Britain
Second Egyptian-Ottoman War (1839–1841)	Ottoman Empire; British Empire	Egypt Eyalet (France) Kingdom of the French; Spain	British Allied victory: Egypt renounced its claim to Syria.
First Opium War (1839–1842)	United Kingdom	Qing dynasty	British victory Treaty of Nanking: Five Chinese ports open to foreign trade; $21,000,000 compensation from the Qing Empire; Hong Kong Island ceded from the Qing Empire
Newport Rising (1839)	United Kingdom	Chartists	British victory
Mysore Rebellion (1840–1841)	East India Company	Forces led by Dhondji Wagh	British victory
Battle of Congella (1842)	United Kingdom	Natalia Republic	British victory
British Conquest of Sindh (1843)	East India Company	Talpur dynasty	British victory
Anglo-Bruneian War (1843–1847)	United Kingdom; Raj of Sarawak; House of Digadong	Sultanate of Brunei; Kingdom of Marudu	Tactical British victory
War of Southern Queensland (1843–1855)	United Kingdom; Colony of New South Wales	Jagera; Wakka Wakka; Kabi Kabi; Dalla	British victory
Gwalior campaign (1843)	East India Company	Gwalior State	British victory
Flagstaff War (1845–1846)	United Kingdom; Colony of New Zealand	Māori	Inconclusive
First Anglo-Sikh War (1845–1846)	East India Company; Patiala State	Sikh Empire	British Allied victory Treaty of Lahore: Extensive territory ceded from the Sikh Empire; Partial control over Sikh foreign affairs
Hutt Valley campaign (1846)	United Kingdom; Colony of New Zealand	Ngāti Toa	British victory
Seventh Xhosa War (1846–1847) The War of the Axe	United Kingdom; Cape Colony	Xhosa tribes	British victory Territory ceded from Xhosa
Whanganui campaign (1847)	United Kingdom; Colony of New Zealand	Māori	Inconclusive
Caste War of Yucatán (1847–1901): Battle of Orange Walk	Mexico; Republic of Yucatán; Guatemala; United Kingdom; British Honduras	Maya	British Allied victory: Republic of Yucatán rejoins the United Mexican States in 1848; Mayas achieve an independent state from 1847 to 1883; Mexico recaptures Yucatán; Conflict between the Mexicans and the Mayans continued until 1933
Second Anglo-Sikh War (1848–1849)	East India Company	Sikh Empire	British victory Complete annexation of the Punjab by the East India Company
Young Ireland rebellion (1848)	United Kingdom	Young Ireland	British victory Rebellion suppressed
Matale rebellion (1848)	United Kingdom	Kandyan rebels	British victory
Battle of Boomplaats (1848)	United Kingdom	Voortrekkers	British victory
Battle of Tysami (1849)	United Kingdom	Chui A-poo's pirates	British victory
Battle of Tonkin River (1849)	United Kingdom; Qing dynasty Nguyễn dynasty	Shap-ng-tsai's pirates	British Allied victory
Soninke-Marabout War (1850–1856)	United Kingdom; France Kingdom of Kombo	Marabout Confederacy	British Allied victory
Eighth Xhosa War (1850–1853) Mlanjeni's War	United Kingdom; Cape Colony	Xhosa tribes Khoikhoi tribes (United Kingdom) Native Kafir Police	British victory Xhosa-Khoi attacks defeated Status quo ante bellum
Operations in the Kohat Pass (1850)	United Kingdom	Afridi Tribesmen	British victory
Taiping Rebellion (1850–1864)	Qing dynasty France; United Kingdom	Taiping Heavenly Kingdom	British Allied victory: Qing dynasty victory; Fall of the Taiping Heavenly Kingdom; Weakening of the Qing dynasty
Mohmand Expeditions (1851–1852)	United Kingdom	Mohmand Tribesmen	British victory
Eureka Rebellion (1851–1854): Battle of the Eureka Stockade	United Kingdom; Colony of Victoria	Stockade rebels	British victory
Reduction of Lagos (1851–1852)	United Kingdom	Lagos	British victory
First Black Mountain Expedition (1852)	United Kingdom	Hindustani mujahideen Black Mountain tribesmen	British victory
Second Anglo-Burmese War (1852–1853)	United Kingdom	Burmese Empire	British victory Burmese revolution ended fighting Lower Burma annexed
Battle of Berea (1852)	United Kingdom	Basuto; Taung	Inconclusive
Crimean War (1853–1856)	(France) French Empire; United Kingdom Ottoman Empire; Kingdom of Sardinia	Russian Empire	British Allied victory Treaty of Paris
The Battle of Muddy Flat (1854) Part of Taiping Rebellion, but before the British switched sides in (1860).	United Kingdom; United States; Taiping Heavenly Kingdom; Shanghai Volunteer Corps	Qing dynasty (A-Pak Pirate Mercenary Fleet)	British Allied victory: Qing forces retreat a mile away from the foreign concessions area; Adherence to Foreign Extraterritoriality Status Maintained; Yangtze Patrol, Shanghai Municipal Council, Shanghai Municipal Police, and the Chinese Maritime Customs Service established
1854 expedition to Coulan	United Kingdom; Qing dynasty Kingdom of Portugal; United States	Chinese pirates	Coalition victory
Battle of Ty-ho Bay (1855)	United Kingdom; United States; Kingdom of Portugal	Chinese Pirates	Coalition victory
Second Opium War (1856–1860) Arrow War	(France) French Empire; United States; United Kingdom	Qing dynasty	British Allied victory The Treaty of Tientsin: Kowloon ceded from the Qing Empire; Peking opened to foreign trade; 11 more Chinese ports opened to foreign trade; Yangtze River opened to foreign warships; 4,000,000 taels of silver compensation; China banned from referring to subjects of the crown as barbarians
Anglo-Persian War (1856–1857)	Afghanistan East India Company	Persia	British Allied victory: Treaty of Paris; Persian withdrawal from Herat
Indian Rebellion of 1857 (1857–1858)	East India Company; Nepal Jammu and Kashmir Princely states: Jaipur; Bikaner; Marwar; Rampur; Kapurthala; Nabha; Bhopal; Sirohi; Udaipur; Patiala; Sirmur; Alwar; Bharathpur; Bundi; Jaora; Bijawar; Ajaigarh; Rewa; Kendujhar; Hyderabad	Sepoys of the East India Company Mughal Empire; Awadh; Jhansi; Jagdishpur; Kohra; Barkagarh; Bijairaghogarh; Banda; Tulsipur; 7 Princely states	British Allied victory Act for the Better Government of India: Company rule in India dissolved; Indian Empire established; Ban on Christian missionaries in India
First Taranaki War (1860–1861)	United Kingdom; Colony of New Zealand	Taranaki Māori Kīngitanga	Inconclusive
Second Taranaki War (1863–1866)	United Kingdom; Colony of New Zealand	Taranaki Māori	Inconclusive
Second Anglo-Ashanti War (1863–1864)	United Kingdom Fante tribes	Ashanti Empire	Stalemate
Invasion of the Waikato (1863–1864)	United Kingdom; Colony of New Zealand	Kīngitanga	British victory
Shimonoseki campaign (1863–1864)	United Kingdom; French Empire; Netherlands; United States	Chōshū Domain	British Allied victory
Bombardment of Kagoshima (1863)	United Kingdom	Satsuma Domain	British victory: Tactical stalemate and mitigated British victory
Ambela campaign (1863–1864)	United Kingdom	State of Swat; Yusufzai	British victory
Tauranga campaign (1864)	United Kingdom; Colony of New Zealand	Tauranga Māori	British victory
Duar War (1864–1865)	India	Bhutan	British victory
Fenian raids (1866–1871)	United Kingdom; Canada	Fenian Brotherhood	British victory
Fenian Rising (1867)	United Kingdom	Irish Republican Brotherhood; Fenian Brotherhood	British victory
British expedition to Abyssinia (1867–1868)	United Kingdom	Ethiopia	British victory: Release of European hostages; Suicide of Emperor Tewodros II; Destruction of Magdala fortress
Klang War (1867–1874) Selangor Civil War	Forces of Raja Abdullah of Klang British Straits Settlements	Forces of Raja Mahadi	British Allied victory
Second Black Mountain Expedition (1868)	India; Tanolis	Hindustani mujahideen Hassanzai; Swati tribe Pariari Sayyids; Tikariwals; Deshiwals; Chagharzais; Nandihar	British victory
Nukapu Expedition (1871–1872)	United Kingdom	Nukapu natives	British victory
Bombardment of Omoa (1873)	United Kingdom	Honduras	British victory
Third Anglo–Ashanti War (1873–1874)	United Kingdom	Ashanti Empire	British victory Treaty of Fomena: 50,000 oz of gold compensation from Ashanti Empire; Ashanti withdrawal from coastal areas; Ashanti banned from practising human sacrifice
Perak War (1875–1876)	United Kingdom	Sultanate of Perak; Perakian Malay rebels	British victory
Ninth Xhosa War (1877–1879)	United Kingdom; Cape Colony	Gcaleka; Ngqika rebels	British victory
Second Sekhukhune War (1878–1879)	United Kingdom	Pedi Kingdom	British victory
Second Anglo-Afghan War (1878–1880)	India; Afzalids	Afghanistan	British-Afzalid victory Treaty of Gandamak: Abdur Rahman Khan installed as Emir; Afghanistan becomes a British protected state; Districts of Quetta, Pishin, Sibi, Harnai and Thal Chotiali ceded to British India
Anglo-Zulu War (1879)	United Kingdom; Natal	Zulu Kingdom	British victory Partition of Zululand
'Urabi revolt (1879–1882)	United Kingdom; Khedivate of Egypt	Egyptian and Sudanese forces under Ahmed Urabi	British Allied victory: 'Urabi's forces defeated and exiled
Basuto Gun War (1880–1881)	United Kingdom; Cape Colony	Basuto people	Basuto victory: Basuto people maintain their partial autonomy; British failure to disarm the Basuto people
First Boer War (1880–1881)	United Kingdom	South African Republic	South African victory Pretoria Convention: South African Republic granted self-government
Mahdist War (1881–1899)	United Kingdom (Kingdom of Italy) Italy; Ethiopian Empire; Congo Free State; Egypt	Mahdist State	British Allied victory: Britain and Egypt took over Sudan and turned it into a condominium known as the Anglo-Egyptian Sudan; Kassala temporarily occupied by Italy
Third Anglo-Burmese War (1885)	United Kingdom	Burmese Empire	British victory Upper Burma annexed to India
Burmese resistance movement (1885–1895)	United Kingdom	Burmese rebels	British victory
Sikkim expedition (1888)	India	(Qing dynasty) Tibet	British victory Tibet recognizes British suzerainty over Sikkim
Hazara Expedition (1888)	United Kingdom; India	Tribes of the Torghar District	British victory
Chin-Lushai Expedition (1889–1890)	India	Tribes of the Chin Hills and Lushai Hills	British victory
Hazara Expedition (1891)	India	Mujahidin; Swatis	British victory
Anglo-Manipur War (1891)	United Kingdom	Kingdom of Manipur	British victory
Ijebu War (1892)	United Kingdom	Ijebu Kingdom	British victory
Hunza–Nagar Campaign (1891)	India	State of Hunza Nagar State	British victory
First Matabele War (1893–1894)	South Africa Company	Ndebele Kingdom	British victory
Lumboka-Chetambe war(1894-1895)	British East Africa Protectotate Wanga Kingdom Buganda Kingdom Maasai	Abaluhya	British victory: Confiscation of guns from the Luhya; Pro-British King appointed to rule over the Western Lake Victoria Basin
Chitral Expedition (1895)I	United Kingdom; India Pro–British Chitralis Dir state	Pashtuns Chitralis	British victory
Fourth Anglo–Ashanti War (1895–1896)	United Kingdom	Ashanti Empire	British victory
Anglo-Zanzibar War (1896)	United Kingdom	Sultanate of Zanzibar	British victory: Pro-British Sultan installed
Second Matabele War (1896–1897)	South Africa Company	Matebele	British victory
Cretan Revolt (1897–1898)	Cretan revolutionaries Kingdom of Greece; British Empire; France (Kingdom of Italy) Italy; Russian Empire; Austria-Hungary (until 12 April 1898); German Empire (until 16 March 1898)	Ottoman Empire	British victory: Establishment of the Cretan State.; Withdraw of Ottoman forces from Crete.
Benin Expedition of 1897 (1897)	United Kingdom	Kingdom of Benin	British victory
Tochi Expedition (1897)	United Kingdom; India	Waziris	British victory
Siege of Malakand (1897)	United Kingdom	Pashtuns	British victory
Mohmand campaign (1897–1898)	United Kingdom; India	Mohmand	British victory
Tirah campaign (1897–1898)	India	Afridi tribe Orakzai tribe Chamkani tribe	British victory
Hut Tax War of 1898 (1898)	United Kingdom	Temne rebels Loko rebels Kissi rebels Mende rebels Sherbro rebels	British victory
Second Samoan Civil War (1898–1899)	Supporters of Tanumafili I United States; United Kingdom	Supporters of Mataʻafa Germany	Inconclusive or other outcome: Tripartite Convention
Six-Day War (1899)	United Kingdom	Punti clans	British victory
Boxer Rebellion (1899–1901)	Eight-Nation Alliance British Empire Russia Japan France Germany United States Italy Austria-Hungary: Netherlands; Spain; Belgium; (Qing dynasty) Mutual Defence Pact of Southeast China (after 1900)	Boxer movement; Qing dynasty (after 1900)	Eight-Nation Alliance victory Boxer Protocol: Anti-foreign societies banned in China
Second Boer War (1899–1902)	United Kingdom	South African Republic; Orange Free State: Foreign volunteers	British victory Treaty of Vereeniging: All Boers to surrender arms and swear allegiance to the Crown; Dutch language permitted in education; Promise to grant Boer republics self-government; £3,000,000 compensation "reconstruction aid" to Afrikaners

== See also ==
- Declaration of war by the United Kingdom
- Military history of the United Kingdom
- British Armed Forces
- List of British military installations
