= List of wars involving the United Kingdom in the 20th century =

This is a list of military conflicts, involving the United Kingdom in the 20th century.

This is part of a larger series of list articles that cover the various wars involving the United Kingdom and the Kingdom of Great Britain. Notable militarised interstate disputes are included. For a list of wars before the Acts of Union 1707 merging the Kingdom of England and Scotland, please see List of wars involving England & List of wars involving Scotland. For a list of wars involving the predecessors of both states and a broader list of wars fought on the Island of Great Britain, see the list of wars in Great Britain.

- List of wars involving the United Kingdom
  - List of wars involving the Kingdom of Great Britain in the 18th century
  - List of wars involving the United Kingdom in the 19th century
  - List of wars involving the United Kingdom in the 20th century
  - List of wars involving the United Kingdom in the 21st century

For the criteria of what may be permitted on this list, see List of wars involving the United Kingdom.

== Key ==
British victory
Another result (Note: for example a treaty or peace without a clear result, status quo ante bellum, result of civil or internal conflict, result unknown or indecisive, inconclusive)
British defeat

== 20th-century wars ==
Conflict	Allies	Opponent(s)	Outcome
War of the Golden Stool (1900)	United Kingdom	Ashanti Empire	British victory: Capture of Yaa Asentawaa and banishment to the Seychelles; Ashanti territories become part of Gold Coast colony in 1902; Ashanti retain control of the Golden Stool
Somaliland campaign (1900–1920)	United Kingdom; Italy; Ethiopia (1900–1904)	Dervish Movement	British victory
Mahsud Waziri blockade (1900–1902)	India	Mahsud rebels	British victory
Ibn Rashid's invasion of Kuwait (1901)	United Kingdom Kuwait	Emirate of Ha'il Ottoman Empire	British victory: Ottoman sultan orders end to siege
Anglo-Aro War (1901–1902)	United Kingdom	Aro Confederacy	British victory: Aro Confederacy destroyed
Kano–Sokoto Expedition (1903): Battle of Kano; Battle of Kwatarkwashi; Battle of Burmi	United Kingdom	Sokoto Caliphate; Kano Emirate	British victory
British expedition to Tibet (1903–1904)	India	(Qing dynasty) Tibet	British victory: Convention of Lhasa; Status quo ante bellum
Bambatha Rebellion (1906)	United Kingdom	Zulu rebels	British victory
Bazar Valley campaign (1908)	India	Rebel tribes	British victory
Muscat Rebellion (1913–1920)	British Empire; Muscat and Oman	Imamate of Oman	Inconclusive or other outcome
First World War (1914–1918)	Allied Powers France; British Empire: United Kingdom; Canada; Newfoundland; Australia; New Zealand; India; South Africa; Russia; United States; Italy; Japan; China; Serbia; Montenegro; Romania; Belgium; Greece; Portugal; Brazil; Other Allies	Central Powers Germany: German Empire; Austria-Hungary; Ottoman Empire; Bulgaria	British Allied victory Treaty of Versailles: German demobilisation; Treaties of Saint-Germain-en-Laye and Trianon: Demise of Austria-Hungary; Russia pulls out in 1917: Russian Civil War; Creation of the Soviet Union; Creation of League of Nations: Mesopotamia ceded from the Ottoman Empire; Palestine and Jordan ceded from the Ottoman Empire; Tanganyika ceded from Germany; Part of Kamerun ceded from Germany; Part of Togoland ceded from Germany; German New Guinea ceded to Australia; German Samoa ceded to New Zealand; German South West Africa ceded to South Africa
Operations in the Tochi (1914–1915)	India	Khost tribesmen	British victory
Chilembwe uprising (1915)	British Empire: Nyasaland	Nyasaland rebels	British victory
Second Saudi-Rashidi War (1915–18)	(United Kingdom of Great Britain and Ireland) British Empire Nejd and Hasa	Jabal Shammar Ottoman Empire	Inconclusive or other outcome
Kelantan Rebellion (1915)	(United Kingdom of Great Britain and Ireland) British Empire: (United Kingdom of Great Britain and Ireland) British Malaya	Kelantanese rebels	British victory: Uprising suppressed
Peshawar campaign (1915)	India	Mohmands, Bunerwals and Swatis	British victory
Bussa Rebellion (1915)	British Empire: British Nigeria	Bussa rebels	British victory: Rebellion suppressed
Invasion of Darfur (1916)	British Empire; Sultanate of Egypt	Sultanate of Darfur	British Allied victory
Easter Rising (1916)	United Kingdom	Irish Republic; Irish Citizen Army; Irish Volunteers; Fianna Éireann; Cumann na mBan; Hibernian Rifles	British victory: Uprising suppressed
Mohmand Blockade (1916–1917)	India	Mohmands	British victory
Mahsuds campaign (1917)	India	Mahsud tribesmen	British victory
Kuki Rebellion of 1917–1919 (1917–1919)	India	Kuki tribes	British victory
Viena expedition (1918)	Russian SFSR; Red Guards; United Kingdom	White Guard; Germany	Red–allied victory
Adubi War (1918)	(United Kingdom of Great Britain and Ireland) British forces	Egba rebels	British victory: Uprising suppressed
Estonian War of Independence (1918–1920)	Estonia; United Kingdom; Latvia (Russia) White movement Baltic German volunteers (Denmark) Danish volunteers (Finland) Finnish volunteers (Sweden) Swedish volunteers	Russian SFSR Baltische Landeswehr	British Allied victory: Independence of Estonia; Vidzeme gained by the Republic of Latvia
Latvian War of Independence (1918–1920)	Latvia; Estonia (Russia) White movement Poland; Lithuania; United Kingdom	German Empire; West Russian Volunteer Army Russian SFSR; Latvian SSR	British Allied victory: Independence of Latvia
Allied intervention in the Russian Civil War (1918–1920)	(Russia) White movement British Empire: United Kingdom; Canada; Australia; India; South Africa; United States; France; Japan; Czechoslovakia; Greece; Estonia; Serbia; Italy; Poland; Romania; China	Russian SFSR Far Eastern Republic; Latvian SSR; Ukrainian SSR; Commune of Estonia; Mongolian Communists	Bolshevik victory: Allied withdrawal from Russia; Bolshevik victory over White Army; Establishment of the Soviet Union
Irish War of Independence (1919–1921)	United Kingdom	(Republic of Ireland) Irish Republic	Inconclusive/Other Anglo-Irish Treaty: Irish Free State established comprising the 26 counties of the formerly proposed Southern Ireland; 6 counties of Northern Ireland remain part of UK with some violence continuing after the treaty; United Kingdom retains the Ports of Berehaven, Spike Island and Lough Swilly
Anglo-Yemeni War (1919–1934)	United Kingdom; Baidah; Na'wah; Rubeaten; Juban	Kingdom of Yemen	Inconclusive/Other Treaty of Sanaa: Yemen annexes Baidah, Na'wah, Rubeaten, and Juban; Britain retains control over the Aden Protectorate
Third Anglo-Afghan War (1919)	India	Afghanistan	Disputed/Unknown: Treaty of Rawalpindi
Turkish War of Independence (1919–1923)	Greece; France; Armenia (in 1920); United Kingdom; Ottoman Empire (until 1922): Kuva-yi Inzibatiye (in 1920); Georgia (in 1921)	Turkish National Movement: Grand National Assembly (after 1920); Kuva-yi Nizamiye; Kuva-yi Milliye (until 1920); Supported by: Russian SFSR; Azerbaijan SSR; Georgian SSR; Bukharan PSR; Afghanistan; All-India Muslim League Italy	Turkish Allied victory Treaty of Lausanne: Overthrow of the Ottoman sultanate; Withdrawal of Allied forces from occupied lands of Turkey; Establishment of the Republic of Turkey; Starting of the series of reforms led by Atatürk
Kuwait–Najd War (1919–1920)	Kuwait; British Empire: India	Sultanate of Nejd: Ikhwan	British Allied victory
Waziristan campaign (1919–1920)	India	Waziristan	British victory
Samakh Raid (1920)	United Kingdom	Arab Kingdom of Syria	Syrian victory: Capture of Samakh
Great Iraqi Revolution (1920)	United Kingdom	Iraqi rebels	British victory: Greater autonomy given to Iraq; Faysal ibn Husayn installed as King; British Mandate for Mesopotamia cancelled
Persian coup d'état (1921)	Persian Cossack Brigade United Kingdom	Persia	Anti–Qajar victory: Deposition of the Qajar dynasty
Waziristan campaign (1921–1924)	British Empire: India	Waziristan	British victory
Burao tax revolt (1922)	United Kingdom • British Somaliland	Habr Yoonis tribesmen	Habr Yoonis tribesmen victory: Tax policy abandoned
IRA Northern Offensive (1922)	United Kingdom	(Republic of Ireland) Irish Republican Army	British victory
Adwan Rebellion (1923)	United Kingdom (Jordan) Emir Abdullah's forces (Jordan) Hashemite allied tribesmen: Sheykh Minwar al-Hadid	(Jordan) Sultan al-Adwan's forces	British Allied victory Sultan al-Adwan's defeat and exile
Pink's War (1925)	United Kingdom	Mahsud	British victory
Wanhsien incident (1926)	United Kingdom	Republic of China	Inconclusive or other outcome
Irene incident (1927)	United Kingdom	Pirates	British victory
Ikhwan Revolt (1927–1930)	Kuwait; Nejd and Hejaz; RAF	Ikhwan	British Allied victory: Ikhwan attack on Kuwait repelled.; The remnants of the Ikhwan incorporated into regular Saudi units.; The Ikhwan leadership was either slain or imprisoned.
Alfridi Redshirt Rebellion (1930-1931)	British Empire: India	Afridi	British victory: Objectives achieved
Mohmand campaign (1935)	British Empire: India	Mohmand Kingdom of Afghanistan	British victory: Revolt suppressed
Great Arab Revolt in Palestine (1936–1939)	United Kingdom: British Army; Palestine Police Force; Jewish Settlement Police; Jewish Supernumerary Police; Special Night Squads; NDF (from 1937): Arab "peace bands"; Jewish National Council: Haganah; Fosh; Peulot Meyuhadot; Irgun	Arab Higher Committee (1936 – October 1937): Local rebel factions (fasa'il); Volunteers from Arab world; Central Committee of National Jihad in Palestine (October 1937 – 1939): Bureau of the Arab Revolt in Palestine (late 1938 – 1939); Society for the Defense of Palestine	Revolt suppressed: Issuance of the White Paper of 1939
Waziristan Campaign (1936–1939)	India	Waziristan	British victory
Palestine Emergency (1939–1948)	United Kingdom: British Army; Royal Navy; Royal Air Force; Royal Marines; Palestine Police Force	Jewish National Council: Irgun (1944–1948); Lehi (1944–1948); Haganah (1945–1946); Palmach; Hish; Him	Zionist victory: British forces unable to suppress insurgency; Insurgency turned British public opinion against the deployment in Palestine, leading to Britain deferring the issue to the United Nations; Start of civil war in Mandatory Palestine in response to the UN Partition Plan
S-Plan; 16 January 1939 – March 1940	United Kingdom	(Republic of Ireland) Irish Republican Army	British victory: British victory; IRA failed to force the withdrawal of British troops from Ireland
Second World War (1939–1945)	Allied Powers United States; Soviet Union; United Kingdom; China; France; Poland; Canada; Australia; New Zealand; British India; South Africa; Yugoslavia; Greece; Denmark; Norway; Netherlands; Belgium; Luxembourg; Czechoslovakia; Ethiopia; Brazil; Mexico (Nepal) Gorkha Kingdom	Axis Powers Germany; Japan; Italy; Hungary; Romania; Bulgaria; Croatia; Slovakia; Finland; Iraq; Thailand; Manchukuo; Mengjiang; Azad Hind; State of Burma Vichy France	British Allied victory: Nazi Germany formally surrenders 8 May 1945, ending the Second World War in Europe.; On 15 August 1945, following the dropping of atom bombs on Hiroshima and Nagasaki, Japan announces its surrender, ending the Second World War.; British (and Commonwealth), French, American, and Soviet troops occupy Germany until 1955; Italy and Japan lose their colonies; Europe is divided into 'Soviet' and 'Western' spheres of interest.
Continuation War (1941 – 1944)	Soviet Union United Kingdom	Finland Germany Italy	Soviet–allied victory: Moscow Armistice
Anglo-Soviet Invasion of Iran (1941)	United Kingdom; Soviet Union	Iran	British–allied victory
Northern Campaign (2 September 1942 – December 1944)	(United Kingdom) Royal Ulster Constabulary	(Republic of Ireland) Irish Republican Army	British victory: IRA campaign failure
Woyane rebellion (May – November 1943)	Ethiopia; United Kingdom	Woyane rebels	Anglo-Ethiopian victory
Afghan tribal revolts of 1944–1947 (1944–1947)	Afghanistan • Allied Nuristani tribesmen British Empire • British India	Rebel tribes: Zadran; Mangal; Safi	Afghan government & British victory: Rebel invasion of India in 1944 repelled; Rebels fully defeated by Afghan government in January 1947
1944–45 Insurgency in Balochistan (1944–1945)	United Kingdom	Badinzai rebels	British victory: Insurgency subsided by March 1945
Dekemvriana (1944–1945)	Kingdom of Greece; United Kingdom	National Liberation Front (Greece); ELAS	British–allied victory
Conquest of al-Ghurfa (1945)	United Kingdom	Al-Ghurfa	British victory
1945 Sheikh Bashir Rebellion (1945)	United Kingdom • British Somaliland	Armed Habr Je'lo tribesmen	British victory Sheikh Bashir killed, unrest continues, anti-colonialist and nationalist sentiment increases in Somaliland
Indonesian National Revolution (1945–1949)	United Kingdom; Netherlands Japan (until 1945)	Indonesia Japan (volunteers) India (defectors)	Inconclusive or other outcome: Hand over to Dutch in 1946; Netherlands recognises Indonesian Independence
Operation Masterdom (1945–1946)	United Kingdom: India; France; Empire of Japan	(North Vietnam) Việt Minh	British Allied victory: Hand over to French; First Indochina War begins
Greek Civil War (1946–1948)	Kingdom of Greece United Kingdom; United States	D.S.E. (Δ.Σ.Ε.) Albania; Yugoslavia; Bulgaria	British Allied victory Communist forces defeated, many D.S.E. soldiers exiled in Eastern Europe. Battalion of UK troops still in Greece until 1948
Corfu Channel incident (1946–1948)	United Kingdom	Albania	Inconclusive or other outcome: World Court case concluded in 1949; Britain breaks off talks aimed at establishing diplomatic relations with Albania.
1947–1948 civil war in Mandatory Palestine (1947–1948)	United Kingdom; Mandatory Palestine	(Israel) Jewish National Council; Haganah; Palmach; Irgun; Lehi; Foreign volunteers; Allied Bedouin tribes; Arab Higher Committee; (All-Palestine Protectorate) Army of the Holy War; Arab Liberation Army; Jordan; Arab Legion	Jewish National Council victory: Issuance of the Israeli Declaration of Independence; Intervention by neighbouring Arab states, beginning the 1948 Arab–Israeli War
1948 Palestine war (1947–1949)	United Kingdom; Mandatory Palestine (before 15 May 1948)	Yishuv (before 14 May 1948); Israel (after 14 May 1948) Before 26 May 1948: Haganah; Palmach; Hish Corps; HIM Corps; Irgun; Lehi; Druze militants; Allied Bedouin tribes; After 26 May 1948: Israel Defense Forces; Sword Battalion; Foreign volunteers: Mahal; Arab Higher Committee (before 15 May 1948); Arab League (after 15 May 1948): Arab Liberation Army; Holy War Army; Al-Najjada; Egypt; All-Palestine Protectorate (after 22 Sep 1948); Transjordan; Syria; Iraq; Lebanon; Saudi Arabia; Yemen	Israeli victory: 1949 Armistice Agreements: Establishment of the State of Israel; Occupation of the Gaza Strip by Egypt and establishment of the All-Palestine Government; Annexation of the West Bank by Jordan (including East Jerusalem); Syrian foothold established to the north and south of the Sea of Galilee
Berlin Blockade (1948-1949)	United States; United Kingdom; France; Canada; Australia; New Zealand; South Africa	Soviet Union	Western Allied victory: Blockade lifted; West Berlin remains under the control of the Western Allies
Malayan Emergency (1948–1960)	(British Empire) British Commonwealth: United Kingdom; Federation of Malaya; Australia; New Zealand; Southern Rhodesia; Fiji; Kenya; Thailand	Malayan Communist Party Malayan National Liberation Army	British Allied victory: Destruction of the majority of MNLA guerrilla organisations, Communist leadership retreat to Thailand; Preservation of capitalism and British economic interests
Operation Valuable (1949–1956)	United Kingdom: MI6; United States: CIA; France: DGSE; NATO: Italy; West Germany; Kingdom of Greece; Turkey; KEVA Yugoslavia	Albania	Albanian Victory: Failure to overthrow the communist government of Enver Hoxha; 300 DGSE, MI6 and CIA agents killed and another 961 NATO agents and paramilitaries killed or captured
Operation Jungle (1949-1955)	United Kingdom; West Germany; Sweden; Denmark; United States	Soviet Union: Lithuanian Soviet Socialist Republic; (Poland) Polish People's Republic	Soviet-Polish victory
Korean War (1950–1953)	United Nations Command South Korea; United States (British Empire) British Commonwealth Forces Korea: United Kingdom; Canada; Australia; New Zealand; India; Belgium; France; Philippines; Colombia; Ethiopia; Greece; Luxembourg; Netherlands; South Africa; Thailand; Turkey	North Korea; China Soviet Union	Inconclusive or other outcome: Korean Armistice Agreement; Communist invasion of South Korea repelled; UN invasion of North Korea repelled
Battle of Ismailia (1952)	United Kingdom	Egyptian police	British victory: 1952 Egyptian revolution
Buraimi dispute (1952–1954)	Trucial Emirates; Emirate of Abu Dhabi; British Empire	Saudi Arabia Supported by: Al Bu Shamis tribe; Na'im tribe	Decisive Trucial Oman Scouts victory: Surrender of Saudi forces; Ceasefire agreement with Bedouin tribes; Saudi Arabia withdraws and Oman regains control of Na'im and Al Bu Shamis, Buraimi and Hamasah; Emirate of Abu Dhabi consolidates control of Al Ain; Start of the Saudi Arabia – United Arab Emirates border dispute
Egyptian revolution (1952)	United Kingdom Egypt	(Egypt) Free Officers Movement	Coup successful: End of British influence in Egypt; Independence of Sudan in 1956
Mau Mau Uprising (1952–1960)	United Kingdom: British Kenya	Mau Mau	British victory: Defeat of Mau Mau; Kenyan independence
Opération Ajax (15-19 August 1953)	United Kingdom United States	Government of Iran	Overthrow of Prime Minister Mohammad Mosaddegh: General Fazlollah Zahedi appointed as prime minister of post-coup military government by Mohammad Reza Shah Pahlavi; Monarchy increased in power relative to government; Pro-Western secular anti-communist Iranian government established
Jebel Akhdar War (1954–1959)	Sultanate of Muscat and Oman; United Kingdom	Imamate of Oman: Ibadi sect Saudi Arabia	British Allied victory: Dissolution of the Imamate of Oman
Cyprus Emergency (1955–1959)	United Kingdom: Cyprus Colony; (Turkey) TMT	EOKA	Inconclusive or other outcome: EOKA was not defeated; Enosis not achieved; Cyprus became an independent republic in 1959 with Britain retaining control of two Sovereign Base Areas, at Akrotiri and Dhekelia.
Suez Crisis (1956)	Israel; United Kingdom; France	Egypt	Inconclusive or other outcome Coalition military victory Egyptian political victory: Israeli occupation of the Sinai Peninsula and the Gaza Strip until March 1957
Border Campaign (1956–1962)	United Kingdom	Irish Republican Army	British victory: IRA campaign fails
First Cod War (1958–1961)	United Kingdom	Iceland	Icelandic victory (Note: Militarised interstate dispute over fishing rights in waters near Iceland; Iceland has never fought in a full-scale war.): Iceland expands its territorial waters to 12 nautical miles
Upper Yafa disturbances (1959)	British Empire: Upper Yafa	Rebels	British victory
Brunei Revolt (1962)	United Kingdom; Brunei	Brunei People's Party	British Allied victory
Indonesia–Malaysia Confrontation (1963–1966)	Commonwealth of Nations: Malaysia; United Kingdom; Australia; New Zealand	Indonesia	British Allied victory Indonesia recognises Malaysian rule over former North Borneo
Dhofar Rebellion (1963–1975)	Oman; United Kingdom; Iran Jordan	Various insurgents	British Allied victory Insurgency defeated Modernisation of Oman
Aden Emergency (1963–1967)	Federation of South Arabia; United Kingdom	(Yemen) NLF FLOSY	Yemeni NLF victory People's Republic of South Yemen established
The Troubles (1968–1998)	United Kingdom	Republican paramilitaries: Provisional IRA; Official IRA; Continuity IRA; Real IRA; Irish National Liberation Army; Irish People's Liberation Organisation; Loyalist paramilitaries: Ulster Volunteer Force; Ulster Defence Association; Red Hand Commando; Ulster Resistance; Loyalist Volunteer Force	Stalemate Inconclusive or other outcome Good Friday Agreement: Devolution in Northern Ireland; Power-sharing deal; Cross-border cooperation; Disarming of paramilitary groups; Police reform; Demilitarisation
Second Cod War (1972–1973)	United Kingdom	Iceland	Icelandic victory UK accept Iceland's 50 nautical mile exclusive fishery zone
Third Cod War (1975–1976)	United Kingdom	Iceland	Icelandic victory Iceland expands its exclusive fishery zone to 200 nautical miles
Soviet–Afghan War (1979–1992)	Afghan mujahideen Supported by: United States; Israel; United Kingdom; Pakistan	Afghanistan; Soviet Union	Allied victory Soviet withdrawal from Afghanistan in February 1989: Soviet defeat helps lead in part to the Revolutions of 1989 and the Dissolution of the Soviet Union; Beginning of Afghan Civil War (1989–1992); Collapse of the Democratic Republic of Afghanistan in 1992; Beginning of Afghan Civil War (1992–1996)
Iranian Embassy siege (1980)	United Kingdom	Democratic Revolutionary Front for the Liberation of Arabistan	British victory
Falklands War (1982)	United Kingdom	Argentina	British victory: British sovereignty over the Falkland Islands and South Georgia and the South Sandwich Islands re-established.; End of Argentine occupation of Southern Thule island.
Multinational Force in Lebanon (1982–1984)	United Kingdom France; United States; Italy	Islamic Jihad Organization; Iran; Ba'athist Syria; Progressive Socialist Party; Amal Movement	Syrian Allied victory: Multinational forces fail to prevent collapse of Lebanese Army into Syrian- or Israeli- supported militias; Multinational forces evacuated after the US embassy and US Marine barracks are bombed by the Islamic Jihad Organization; Multinational forces oversee withdrawal of Palestine Liberation Organization; Humanitarian crisis in Southern Lebanon; Civil war continues until 1990; President Hafez al-Assad continues his occupation of Lebanon until his son and later president Bashar al-Assad orders a withdrawal from the country
Gulf War (1990–1991)	Kuwait United States; United Kingdom; Saudi Arabia; France; Egypt; Syria; Other Allies	Iraq	Allied victory: Kuwait regains its independence
Iraqi no-fly zones conflict (1991–2003)	United States; United Kingdom; Turkey; Saudi Arabia; Australia; Peshmerga; Germany; Netherlands Spain; Portugal; France (up to 1998)	Iraq	Operational success: Subsumed by 2003 invasion of Iraq
Bosnian War (1992–1995)	(United Nations) UNPROFOR NATO	Republika Srpska; Serbian Krajina; Western Bosnia	Military stalemate Dayton Accords
Turbot War (1995)	Canada; United Kingdom; Ireland	Spain; European Union	British Canadian victory
Operation Desert Fox (1998)	United States United Kingdom	Iraq	British Allied victory: Objectives largely achieved
Kosovo War (1998–1999)	United States United Kingdom; France; Canada; Denmark; Germany; Italy; Kosovo Liberation Army	FR Yugoslavia	British Allied victory: Kosovo occupied by Nato forces; Kosovo administered by UNMIK

== See also ==
- Declaration of war by the United Kingdom
- Military history of the United Kingdom
- British Armed Forces
- List of British military installations
