= List of wars involving the Kingdom of Great Britain in the 18th century =

This is a list of military conflicts, involving the Kingdom of Great Britain in the 18th century.

This is part of a larger series of list articles that cover the various wars involving the United Kingdom and the Kingdom of Great Britain. Notable militarised interstate disputes are included. For a list of wars before the Acts of Union 1707 merging the Kingdom of England and Scotland, please see List of wars involving England & List of wars involving Scotland. For a list of wars involving the predecessors of both states and a broader list of wars fought on the Island of Great Britain, see the list of wars in Great Britain.

- List of wars involving the United Kingdom
  - List of wars involving the Kingdom of Great Britain in the 18th century
  - List of wars involving the United Kingdom in the 19th century
  - List of wars involving the United Kingdom in the 20th century
  - List of wars involving the United Kingdom in the 21st century

For the criteria of what may be permitted on this list, see List of wars involving the United Kingdom.

== Key ==
British victory
Another result (Note: for example a treaty or peace without a clear result, status quo ante bellum, result of civil or internal conflict, result unknown or indecisive, inconclusive)
British defeat

== 18th-century wars ==
Conflict	Allies	Opponent(s)	Outcome
The Great Northern War (1700–1721)	Swedish Empire; Holstein-Gottorp (1700–1714); Warsaw Confederation (1704–1709); Ottoman Empire (1710–1713); Crimean Khanate (1710–1713); Cossack Hetmanate (1708–1714); Dutch Republic (1700); England (1700); Scotland (1700); (Kingdom of Great Britain) Great Britain (1719–1720)	Tsardom of Russia; Cossack Hetmanate; Kalmyk Khanate; (Electorate of Saxony) Saxony (1700–1706, 1709–1719); Duchy of Courland (1700–1701); Polish–Lithuanian Commonwealth (1701–1704, 1709–1719); Sandomierz Confederation (1704–1709); Denmark–Norway (1700, 1709–1720); (Kingdom of Prussia) Prussia (1715–1720); (Electorate of Brunswick-Lüneburg) Hanover (1715–1719); (Kingdom of Great Britain) Great Britain (1717–1719); Moldavia	Anti-Swedish coalition victory: Treaty of Nystad: Russia gains the three dominions Estonia, Livonia and Ingria as well as parts of Kexholm and Viborg.; Treaties of Stockholm: Prussia gains parts of Swedish Pomerania; Hanover gains Bremen-Verden.; Treaty of Frederiksborg: Holstein–Gottorp loses its part of the Duchy of Schleswig to Denmark-Norway.; Treaty of the Pruth: Azov area is ceded back to the Ottoman Empire. Russia demolishes strategic castles such as Taganrog. Charles XII of Sweden gets safe passage from Turkey to Sweden in 1711.
The War of the Spanish Succession (1701–1714) including: Queen Anne's War	(Holy Roman Empire) Austria Dutch Republic; Savoy England (Until 1707); Great Britain (After 1707); Prussia; Portugal	France; Spain; Bavaria	British victory: Treaty of Utrecht; Philip V recognized as King of Spain by the Grand Alliance; Territory in Canada and the West Indies ceded from France; Territory in Europe ceded from Spain; Indecisive or failure for Britain's various allies
Tuscarora War (1711–1715)	North Carolina; South Carolina; Apalachee; Catawba; Cherokee; Yamasee	Tuscarora; Coree; Cothechney; Machapunga; Mattamuskeet; Neusiok; Pamlico; Seneca; Weetock	British-Allied victory: Tuscaroras migrate to New York and join the Iroquois Confederacy; Native American enslavement began to decline, while African American enslavement began to increase
Yamasee War (1715–1717)	Colonial militia of South Carolina; Colonial militia of North Carolina; Colonial militia of Virginia; Catawba (from 1715); Cherokee (from 1716)	Yamasee; Ochese Creeks; Catawba (until 1715); Cherokee (until 1716); Waxhaw; Santee	British-Allied Victory: Power of the Yamasee broken; South Carolina colonists establish uncontested control of the coast; The Catawba become the dominant tribe in the interior; Native American enslavement began to decline, while African American enslavement began to increase
Post-Spanish Succession Caribbean piracy (1715–1730)	Great Britain	Anglo-American-Caribbean privateers Republic of Pirates	British victory Details: Piracy outlawed by Treaty of Utrecht; Anti-Caribbean Piracy campaign by Royal Navy; Disestablishment of the Republic of Pirates in 1718; Defeat of Edward Teach in 1718; Defeat of John Rackham in 1720; Defeat of Bartholomew Roberts in 1722; Defeat of Edward Low in 1724; Most outlawed Caribbean privateers captured or killed by 1730, marking the end of the Golden Age of Piracy
Civil war: (1715–1716) Jacobite rising of 1715 including: The Jacobite uprising in Cornwall	Great Britain	Jacobites	British victory: Jacobite restoration attempt defeated
The War of the Quadruple Alliance including: The Nineteen Uprising in Great Britain (1717–1720)	Holy Roman Empire; Great Britain France; Dutch Republic; Savoy	Spain Jacobites	British-Allied victory: Royal navy won a battle; a small-scale Jacobite invasion was defeated; Treaty of The Hague: Spanish attempt at expansion fails.
Chickasaw Wars (1721–1763)	Great Britain; Chickasaw	France; Choctaw; Illini	British-Allied victory: Treaty of Paris
Dummer's War (1721–1725)	New England Colonies; Mohawk	Wabanaki Confederacy	British victory: Britain recognises the rights of the region's indigenous inhabitants.
Anglo-Spanish War (1727–1729)	Great Britain	Spain	Inconclusive or other outcome: Treaty of Seville; Status quo ante bellum
First Maroon War (1728–1739)	(Kingdom of Great Britain) Colony of Jamaica	Windward Maroons; Leeward Maroons	Inconclusive or other outcome: British government offers peace treaties; Cudjoe agrees to stop attacks, not take part in new escapees and help capture escaping slaves; British give Leeward Maroons their freedom, own land, the right to hunt wild pigs and have their own government
Luso-Maratha War (1729–1732)	(Portugal) Portuguese Empire; East India Company	Maratha Empire	Inconclusive or other outcome: Status quo ante bellum
Rebellion of Sheikh Ahmad Madani (1730–1734)	Safavid Empire; Nader's personal domains East India Company; Dutch East India Company	Forces Loyal to Sheikh Ahmad Madani; Forces Loyal to Sheikh Jabbara; Forces Loyal to Sheikh Rashid bin Sa'id of Basaidu; Rebelling Arab tribes Hotak remnants and Afghan raiders	British-Allied victory: Persian Gulf Arabs reincorporated into Safavid Empire.
Affair of Porto Novo (1733–1734)	East India Company (New France) French East India Company	(Sweden) Swedish East India Company	British-Allied victory
The War of Jenkins' Ear (1739–1748) Location: New Granada, Caribbean, Florida, Georgia, North Carolina, Pacific and Atlantic	Great Britain	Spain: Spanish Empire	Inconclusive/other outcome: Status quo ante bellum; British offensive in the Caribbean theatre defeated; British invasion of Florida repulsed; Spanish invasion of Georgia repulsed; Treaty of Aix-la-Chapelle (1748) leading to Treaty of Madrid (1750)
The War of the Austrian Succession (1740–1748) including: King George's War; The War of Jenkins' Ear; The First Carnatic War	(Holy Roman Empire) Austria Great Britain (Province of Hanover) Hanover; Dutch Republic; Saxony; Sardinia; Russia; East India Company	France Prussia; Spain: Spanish Empire; Bavaria; Saxony (Kingdom of the Two Sicilies) Naples and Sicily; Genoa; Sweden (Kingdom of France) French East India Company	French–allied victory in Europe but British victory outside of Europe: Treaty of Aix-la-Chapelle:
Civil War: Jacobite rising of 1745 (1745–1746)	Great Britain	Jacobites	British victory: Jacobite restoration attempt defeated
Father Le Loutre's War (1749–1755)	Great Britain	France; Wabanaki Confederacy	British victory
The Second Carnatic War (1749–1754)	East India Company; Forces of Nasir Jang Mir Ahmad; Forces of Mohamed Ali Khan Walajan	(Kingdom of France) French East India Company; Forces of Chanda Shahib; Forces of Muhyi ad-Din Muzaffar Jang Hidayat	British–allied victory: Treaty of Pondicherry; Pro-British Mohamed Ali Khan Walajan became Nawab of the Carnatic
First Polygar War (1755)	East India Company	Polygars	Inconclusive
Battle of Vijaydurg (1756)	(Kingdom of Great Britain) Great Britain; East India Company; Maratha Empire	Colaba State	British–allied victory
Seven Years' War (1756–1763) including: Third Carnatic War; French and Indian War; Pomeranian War; Third Silesian War; Anglo-Spanish War; Fantastic War	Great Britain: East India Company; British America; Prussia (Province of Hanover) Hanover; Iroquois Confederacy; Portugal; Brunswick-Wolfenbüttel; Hesse-Kassel; Schaumburg-Lippe Cherokee Nation (before 1758) Catawba Mingo Lenape (from 1758) Wyandot of Ohio Country (British supported faction)	France: New France; (New France) French East India Company; Holy Roman Empire; Russian Empire; Sweden; Spain: (Spain) Spanish Empire; Saxony; Sardinia Mughal Empire; Bengal Subah; Wabanaki Confederacy Miꞌkmaq Algonquin Ojibwe Odawa Shawnee Lenape (until 1758) Wyandot of Fort Detroit (French supported faction)	British–allied victory: Treaty of Paris; Extensive North American lands (incl. all of Canada) ceded from France; Caribbean colonies ceded from France; Senegal River colony (excluding Gorée) ceded from France; Florida ceded from Spain; French trading posts in India administered by British; Sumatra ceded from France
Anglo-Cherokee War (1758–1761)	Great Britain	Cherokee	British victory: Pro–British Attakullakulla becomes Cherokee leader
Battle of Chinsurah (1759)	East India Company; Bengal Subah	Dutch East India Company	British–allied victory
Tacky's War (1760–1761)	Great Britain; Colony of Jamaica; Jamaican Maroons	Jamaican Cromanty	British–allied victory: Slave revolt suppressed
Sannyasi rebellion (1763-1800)	East India Company	Indian Rebels	British victory
Siege and occupation of serampore (1763)	Great Britain	Danish India	British victory: Serampore temporarily occupied by Great Britain
Pontiac's War (1763–1766)	Great Britain	Native American Coalition: Odawa; Potawatomi; Ojibwe; Mingo; Seneca people; Wyandot people; Miami people; Kickapoo people; Illinois People	Inconclusive or other outcome: British policy change; British suzerainty over First Nation Tribes; Niagara Falls area ceded from Seneca Nation
Bengal War (1763–1765)	East India Company	Mughal Empire	British victory: Treaty of Allahabad
Third Battle of Katwa (19 July 1763)	East India Company	Bengal Subah	British victory
War of the Regulation (1766-1771)	North Carolina	Regulators	British victory: Rebellion crushed; Survivors were either forced to sign loyalty oaths, had their houses burned, or fled to the West in exile; This war was a predecessor to the American Revolution
First Anglo-Mysore War (1767–1769)	East India Company Maratha Empire; Hyderabad State	Kingdom of Mysore	Mysorean victory: Hyderabad cedes territory to Mysore
First Carib War (1769–1773)	Great Britain	Carib rebels	Inconclusive or other outcome
First Rohilla War (1773–1774)	Oudh State; East India Company	Kingdom of Rohilkhand	British–allied victory
Lord Dunmore’s War (1774)	Colony of Virginia	Shawnees; Mingos	British Victory: Treaty of Camp Charlotte; Native Americans surrendered their hunting rights south of the Ohio
First Anglo-Maratha War (1775–1783)	East India Company	Maratha Empire	Maratha victory: Treaty of Salbai.; Maratha support for Britain against Mysore
American Revolutionary War (1775–1783); Anglo-French War (1778–1783); Anglo-Spanish War (1779–1783)	Great Britain Iroquois; Cherokee; Hanover; Loyalists	United States; France Spain Oneida tribe Tuscarora tribe Watauga Association; Catawba tribe	Civil War / American Allied victory: The American Revolution started as a civil war within the British Empire. (Note: Some historians name the 1861–1865 war the "Second American Civil War", because in their view, the American Revolutionary War can also be considered a civil war (since the term can be used in reference to any war in which one political body separates itself from another political body). They then refer to the Independence War, which resulted in the separation of the Thirteen Colonies from the British Empire, as the "First American Civil War". A significant number of American colonists stayed loyal to the British Crown and as Loyalists fought on the British side while opposite were a significant amount of colonists called Patriots who fought on the American side. In some localities, there was fierce fighting between Americans including gruesome instances of hanging, drawing, and quartering on both sides.: As early as 1789, David Ramsay, an American patriot historian, wrote in his History of the American Revolution that "Many circumstances concurred to make the American war particularly calamitous. It was originally a civil war in the estimation of both parties." Framing the American Revolutionary War as a civil war is gaining increasing examination.. You can read part two of his 1789 book in full here; A group of Bristol, England merchants wrote to King George III in 1775 voicing their "most anxious apprehensions for ourselves and Posterity that we behold the growing distractions in America threaten" and ask for their majesty's "Wisdom and Goodness" to save them from "a lasting and ruinous Civil War.". You can read the 1775 petition in full here; The "constrained voice" is a good synopsis of how the British viewed the American Revolutionary War. From anxiety to a foreboding sense of the conflict being a civil war, In the early stages of the rebellion by the American colonists, most of them still saw themselves as English subjects who were being denied their rights as such. "Taxation without representation is tyranny," James Otis reportedly said in protest of the lack of colonial representation in Parliament. What made the American Revolution look most like a civil war, though, was the reality that about one-third of the colonists, known as loyalists (or Tories), continued to support and fought on the side of the crown.) It became a larger international war in 1778 once France joined. (Note: France entered the American Revolution on the side of the colonists in 1778, turning what had essentially been a civil war into an international conflict.: The Revolution was both an international conflict, with Britain and France vying on land and sea, and a civil war among the colonists, causing over 60,000 loyalists to flee their homes.; Until early in 1778 the conflict was a civil war within the British Empire, but afterward it became an international war as France (in 1778) and Spain (in 1779) joined the colonies against Britain. Meanwhile, the Netherlands, which provided both official recognition of the United States and financial support for it, was engaged in its own war against Britain.); Treaty of Paris: 13 North American colonies recognised as the independent United States of America; Territory in North America ceded to the newly independent United States of America; Senegal River colony returned to France; French recognises British suzerainty over the Gambia river; Territory in India returned to France; British retention and creation of British North America; Menorca ceded to Spain; East & West Florida ceded to Spain
Fourth Anglo-Dutch War (1780–1784)	Great Britain	Dutch Republic; Dutch East India Company (Kingdom of France) France	British victory Treaty of Paris: Dutch Republic cedes territory in India, Nagapatnam, to Great Britain; The Dutch Republic did not enter into a formal alliance with the rebelling American colonies and their allies.; Weakening of the Dutch colonial empire, while Great Britain's colonial power increased.
Second Anglo-Mysore War (1780–1784)	East India Company Maratha Empire; Hyderabad State	Kingdom of Mysore France	Status quo ante bellum: Treaty of Mangalore
Banaras Uprising (1781)	East India Company	Indian Rebels	British victory
Revolt in Bihar (1781)	East India Company	Zamindars and chiefs	British victory
Third Anglo-Mysore War (1789–1792)	East India Company Maratha Empire; Hyderabad State; Travancore	Kingdom of Mysore: Arakkal Kingdom; Nawab of Savanur; France	British–allied victory: Treaty of Seringapatam; Half of Mysore territory ceded to the East India Company
Ibn Ufaisan's invasion (1792)	Kuwait; Great Britain: East India Company	Emirate of Diriyah	British–allied victory
Ibn Ufaisan's Invasion (1793)	Kuwait; Great Britain: East India Company	Emirate of Diriyah	British–allied victory: Saudi retreat from Kuwait.
War of the First Coalition (1793–1797)	Dutch Republic (until 1795); Great Britain; Holy Roman Empire (until 1797): Hesse-Kassel (until 1795); (Kingdom of Württemberg) Württemberg (until 1796); Baden (until 1796); Papal States (until 1797); Parma (until 1796); Portugal; Prussia (until 1795); Sardinia (until 1796); Spain (until 1795); Naples (until 1796); Other Italian states Switzerland	(Constitutional Cabinet of Louis XVI) Kingdom of France (until 1792) (French First Republic) French Republic (from 1792) French satellites: Batavian Republic (from 1795); Sister republics; Spain (from 1796, naval only)	French victory: French annexation of the Austrian Netherlands, the Left Bank of the Rhine, Savoy and other smaller territories; Santo Domingo to France; Several French "sister republics" established; End of millennial Venetian independence; Treaty of The Hague, Treaty of Paris, Peaces of Basel, Treaty of Tolentino, Treaty of Campo Formio; Establishment and survival of the French Republic; Napoleon becomes a political actor; Hostilities resume in 1798 with the formation of a Second Coalition against France
Second Rohilla War (1794)	Oudh State; East India Company	Rampur State	British–allied victory
Fédon's Rebellion (1795–1796)	Great Britain	Grenadan revolutionaries	British victory
Second Carib War (1795–1797)	Great Britain	Carib rebels French Republic	British victory
Second Maroon War (1795–1796)	Great Britain; British Jamaica	Jamaican Maroons	British victory Details: Treaty signed established that the Maroons would beg on their knees for the King's forgiveness, return all runaway slaves, and be relocated elsewhere in Jamaica; Breach of treaty caused deportation of several Maroons to Nova Scotia and later to Sierra Leone in Africa
Hawkesbury and Nepean Wars (1795–1816)	Burrberongal Tribe; Great Britain from 1801:United Kingdom of Great Britain and Ireland	Dharug; Eora; Tharawal; Gandangara; Irish-convict sympathisers	British victory: Displacement of Aborigines from their land
Anglo-Spanish War (1796–1808) Location: Newfoundland, English Channel, Straits of Gibraltar, Balearic Islands, Atlantic Ocean, Caribbean, Viceroyalty of the Río de la Plata	Great Britain from 1801: United Kingdom of Great Britain and Ireland	Spain; French Republic	Inconclusive or other outcome
Kandyan Wars (1796–1818)	Great Britain from 1801: United Kingdom of Great Britain and Ireland	Kingdom of Kandy	British victory
War of the Second Coalition (1797–1802)	Holy Roman Empire (until 1801) (Note: Nominally the Holy Roman Empire, under Austrian Habsburg rule, also nominally encompassed some other Italian states abolished in 1797, as well as other Habsburg states such as the Grand Duchy of Tuscany.): Tuscany; Bavaria; United Kingdom; Russia; Ottoman Empire; Naples (until 1801); Portugal; Sardinia	French Republic (Spain) Spain; French client republics: Batavian Republic; (Italy) Cisalpine Republic; Helvetic Republic; (Genoa) Ligurian Republic; Parthenopean Republic	French victory Treaty of Lunéville, Treaty of Amiens: Survival of the French Republic; Previous annexations by France confirmed; Hostilities resume in 1803 with the formation of a Third Coalition against France; Territorial changes: Trinidad, Ceylon and Malta to Britain, Parma and Louisiana to France, Tuscany to the House of Bourbon, Foundation of the Septinsular Republic
Irish Rebellion of 1798 (1798)	Great Britain; Kingdom of Ireland	Irish Republic; United Irishmen; Defenders (France) French Republic	British victory: Rebellion defeated
Fourth Anglo-Mysore War (1798–1799)	East India Company Maratha Empire; Hyderabad State	Kingdom of Mysore	British–allied victory: Complete annexation of Mysore by Britain and allies
Second Polygar War (1799)	East India Company	Polygars of the Tirunelveli district	British victory: Rebel leaders Kattabomman Nayak, Subramania Pillai and Soundra Pandian Nayak executed
Third Polygar War (1800–1801)	East India Company	Polygars	British victory: Carnatic Treaty; British assume direct control over Tamil Nadu

== See also ==
- Declaration of war by the United Kingdom
- Military history of the United Kingdom
- British Armed Forces
- List of British military installations
