= Invasions of Normandy =

The Invasion of Normandy was a successful Allied landing operation in 1944 into northern France from England during World War II.

Invasion of Normandy may also refer to:

- Scandinavian invasions of Normandy, a series of invasions in the 9th century
- Henry I of England's invasion of Normandy culminating in the Battle of Tinchebray (1106)
- The French invasion of Normandy (1202–04)

== See also ==
- Norman conquest (disambiguation)
