= Military history of England =

The military history of England and Wales deals with the period prior to the creation of the United Kingdom of Great Britain in 1707.(for the period after 1707, see Military history of the United Kingdom)

== List of military encounters ==
=== Medieval period ===
- Battle of Aylesford (455)
- Battle of Badon (c. 500)
- Battle of Ellandun (825)
- Viking invasions (793–1066)
  - Battle of Hingston Down (838)
  - Battle of Aclea (851)
  - Battle of York (867)
  - Battle of Englefield 870
  - Battle of Reading (871)
  - Battle of Ashdown (871)
  - Battle of Basing (871)
  - Battle of Meretun (871)
  - Campaign of Alfred the Great (871–899)
    - Battle of Edington (878)
    - Battle of Cynwit (878)
  - Battle of Assandun (1016)
  - Battle of Fulford (1066)
  - Battle of Stamford Bridge (1066)
- Norman conquest of England (1066)
  - Battle of Hastings (1066)
- Rebellion of 1088
- The Anarchy (1138–53)
- Revolt of 1173–74
- Third Crusade (1189–1192)
- French invasion of Normandy (1202–1204)
- Welsh uprising of 1211
- Anglo-French War (1213–1214)
- First Barons' War (1215–1217)
- Saintonge War (1242–43)
- Second Barons' War (1264–1267)
- Welsh Uprising (1282)
- Gascon War (1294–1303)
- The First War of Scottish Independence (1296–1328)
  - Battle of Bannockburn (1314)
- The Second War of Scottish Independence (1332–1357)
- Hundred Years' War (1337–1453)
  - Edwardian phase (1337–60)
  - War of the Breton Succession (1341–65)
  - Caroline phase (1369–89)
  - Lancastrian phase (1415–53)
- Wars of the Roses (1455–1485) – The Wars of the Roses claimed an estimated 105,000 dead

=== Early Modern period ===
- Italian Wars (1494–1559)
  - War of the League of Cambrai (1511–13)
  - Italian War of 1521–26
  - Italian War of 1542–46
  - Italian War of 1551–59 (1557–59)
- Cornish Rebellion (1497)
- Anglo-Scottish Wars (1513; 1544–51)
- Third Cornish Uprising (1549)
- Siege of Calais (1558)
- Desmond Wars (1569-83)
- Anglo-Spanish War (1585–1604) – The Anglo-Spanish War might be said to be the first world war, in that it was fought on three continents (Europe and the Americas) and two oceans (the Atlantic and, just barely, the Pacific)
- Nine Years' War (Ireland) (1594–1603)
- Eighty Years' War (1585–1648)
- First Anglo-Powhatan War (1609–1613)
- Uskok War (1615-1617)
- Second Anglo-Powhatan War (1622)
- Anglo-Spanish War (1625–30)
- Anglo-French War (1627–1629)
- Wars of the Three Kingdoms (1639–1651)
  - First Bishops' War (1639)
  - Second Bishops' War (1640)
  - Irish Rebellion (1641)
  - The Confederates' War (1642-1648)
  - English Civil War (1642–1651)
    - First English Civil War (1642–1646) – 190,000 Englishmen died
    - Civil War in Scotland (1644–1647)
    - Second English Civil War (1648)
    - Cromwellian conquest of Ireland (1649–53) – Cromwell killed 300,000 to 500,000 Irish in his invasion
    - Third English Civil War (1650–1651)
- Third Anglo-Powhatan War (1644)
- First Anglo-Dutch War (1652–54)
- Anglo-Spanish War (1654–60)
- English invasion of Acadia (1654)
- English expedition to Portugal (1662–1668)
- Second Anglo-Dutch War (1665–67)
- War of Devolution (1667–1668)
- Third Anglo-Dutch War (1672–1674)
- King Philip's War (1675–1676)
- Virginia Rebellion (1676)
- Monmouth Rebellion (1685)
- Nine Years' War (1688–1697)
  - King William's War (1688–1697)
- Jacobite Rebellions (1689–91)
  - Williamite War in Ireland (1688–1691)
  - Battle of the Boyne (1690)
- War of the Spanish Succession (1702–1713)
  - Queen Anne's War (1702–1713)
- For military history after the Acts of Union 1707 see the military history of the United Kingdom

== List of civil wars ==
1. Rebellion of 1088 – in England and Normandy
2. The Anarchy (1135–1154) – in England
3. Revolt of 1173–74 – in England, Normandy, and Anjou
4. First Barons' War (1215–1217) – in England
5. Second Barons' War (1264–1267) – in England
6. Welsh Uprising (1282) – in England and Wales
7. Despenser War (1321–1322)
8. Wars of the Roses (1455–1485) – in England and Wales; Richard III was the last English king to die in combat
9. Wars of the Three Kingdoms (1639–1651) – in England, Wales, Scotland and Ireland
  - First Bishops' War (1639)
  - Second Bishops' War (1640)
  - Irish Rebellion of 1641
  - First English Civil War (1642–1646)
  - The Confederates' War (1642–1648)
  - Scotland in the Wars of the Three Kingdoms (1644–1647)
  - Second English Civil War (1648)
  - Third English Civil War (1650–1651)
  - Cromwellian conquest of Ireland (1649)
10. Monmouth Rebellion (1685) – in England
11. Jacobite Rebellions (1689-91; 1715-16; 1719; 1745–1746) – in England, Scotland and Ireland
  - Williamite War in Ireland (1688–1691)
  - Battle of the Boyne (1690) – last battle between two rival claimants for the throne

== See also ==
- List of wars involving England
- List of wars involving England and France
- List of wars involving Great Britain
- List of wars in Great Britain
