= Norman campaigns =

Norman campaigns may refer to:

- Norman Conquest
- Norman conquest of southern Italy
- Norman invasion of Wales
- Anglo-Norman invasion of Ireland
- Breton–Norman war (1064–1066)
- Norman invasion of Malta
- Byzantine–Norman wars
  - Byzantine–Norman war (1147–1149)
- Invasion of Normandy by Philip II of France (1202–1204)

== See also ==
- Norman conquest (disambiguation)
