= Lists of wars involving the United Kingdom =

This is a list of conflicts involving the United Kingdom of Great Britain and Northern Ireland and its predecessor states (the Kingdom of Great Britain (and Ireland)). Notable militarised interstate disputes are included. For a list of wars before the Acts of Union 1707 merging the Kingdom of England and Scotland, see List of wars involving England & List of wars involving Scotland. For a list of wars involving the predecessors of both states and a broader list of wars fought on the Island of Great Britain, see the list of wars in Great Britain. Historically, the United Kingdom relied most heavily on the Royal Navy and maintained relatively small land forces. Most of the episodes listed here deal with insurgencies and revolts in the various colonies of the British Empire. During its history, the United Kingdom's forces (or forces with a British mandate) have invaded, had some control over or fought conflicts in 171 of the world's 193 countries that are currently UN member states, or nine out of ten of all countries.

== Lists ==
1707–1801		List of wars involving the Kingdom of Great Britain in the 18th century
1801–1900	Battle_in_Waterloo_1815_(cropped)	List of wars involving the United Kingdom in the 19th century
1901–2000	Photography_during_the_First_World_War_CO874	List of wars involving the United Kingdom in the 20th century
2001–present	Soldiers_Patrolling_in_Afghanistan_MOD_45154539	List of wars involving the United Kingdom in the 21st century

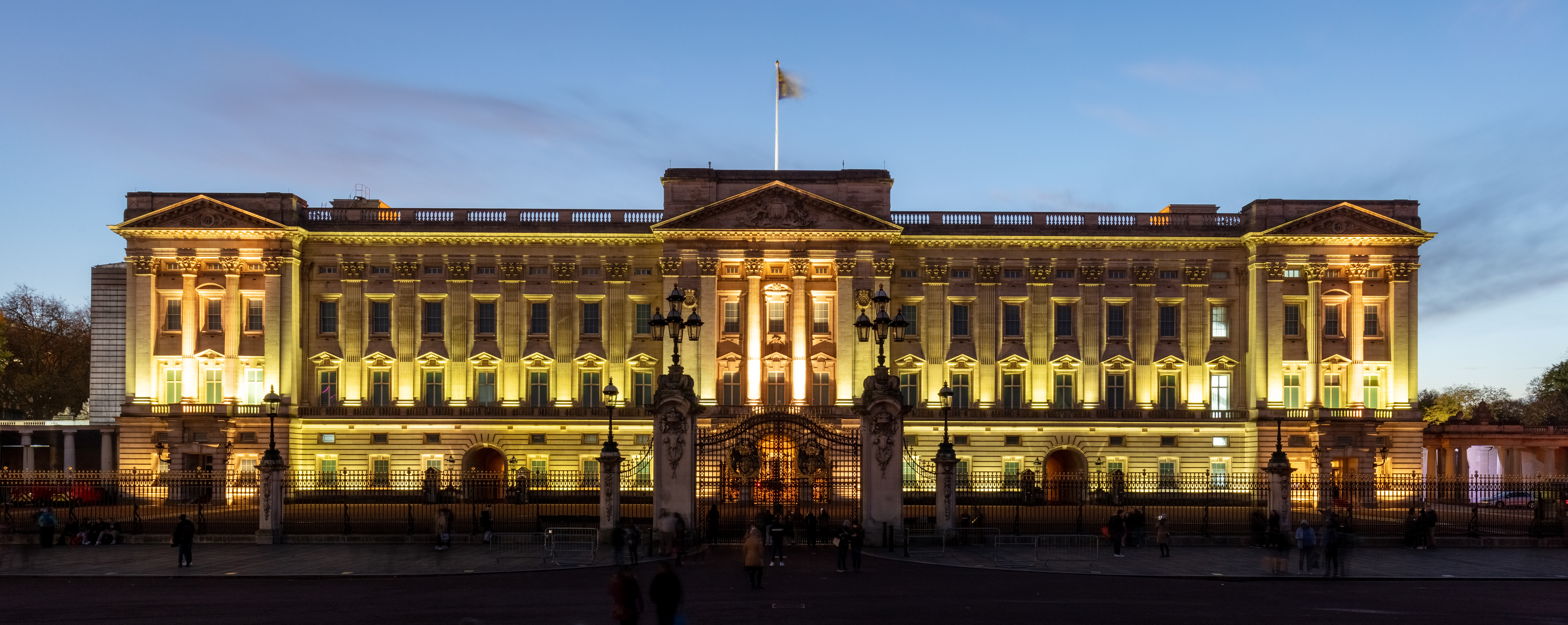
Buckingham Palace, the seat of the Monarchy of the United Kingdom in London. The king is the head of the British Armed Forces.

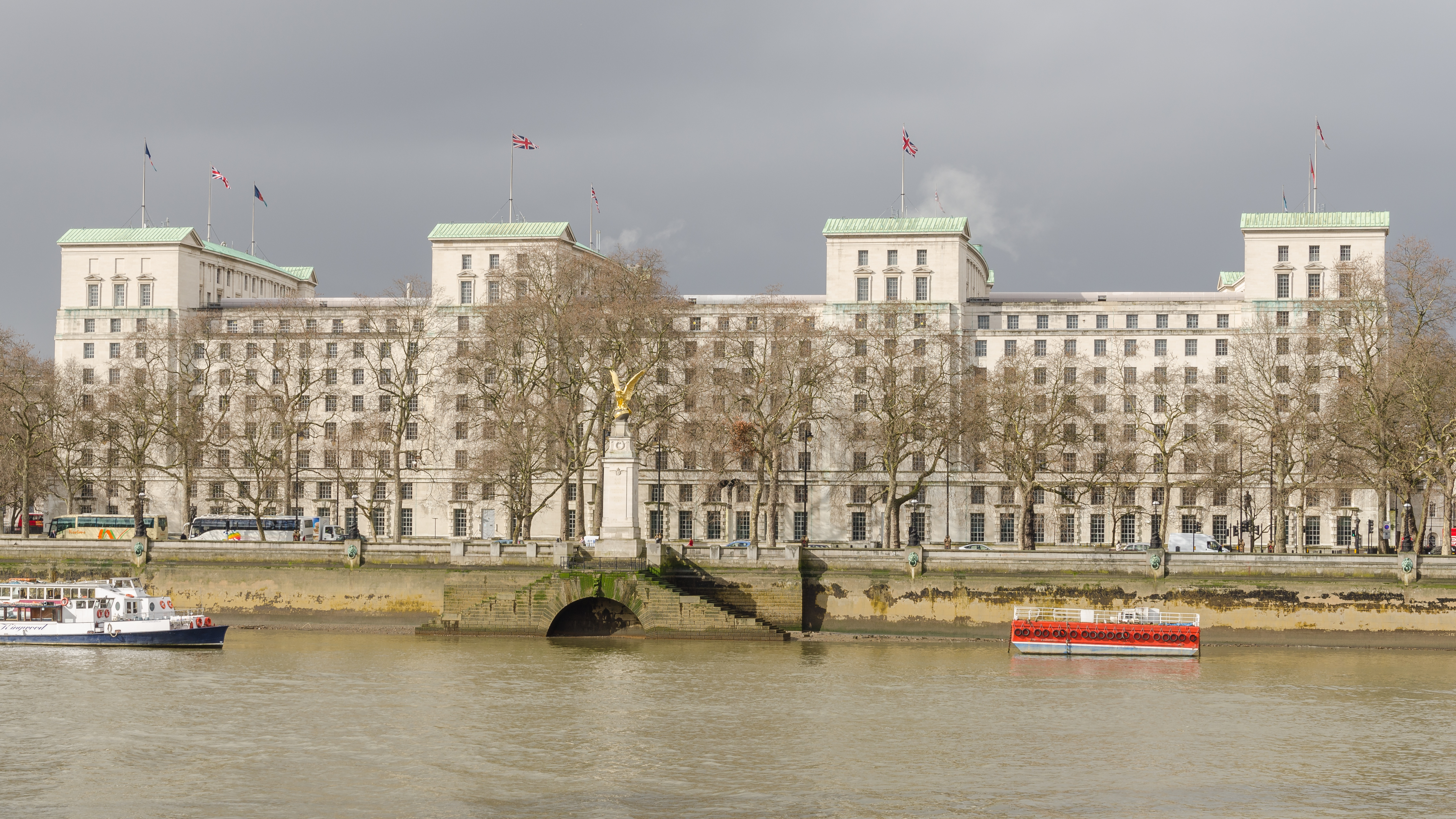
The Ministry of Defence headquarters in Whitehall in London. The MoD coordinates and supervises the three armed services: the Navy, Army and the Air Force.

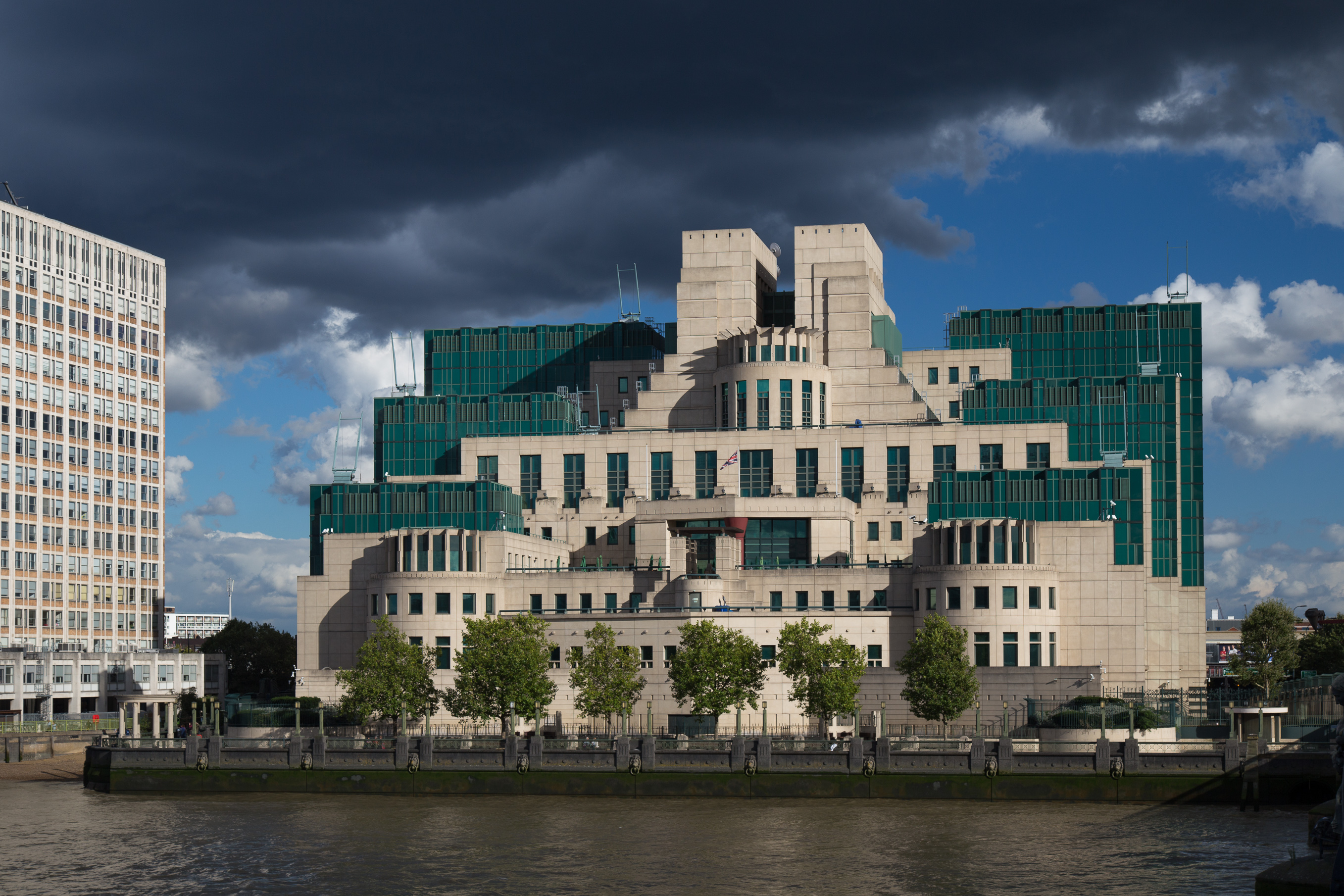
Secret Intelligence Service (SIS) headquarters at Vauxhall Cross in London. SIS collects and analyses intelligence from around the world and conducts covert operations.

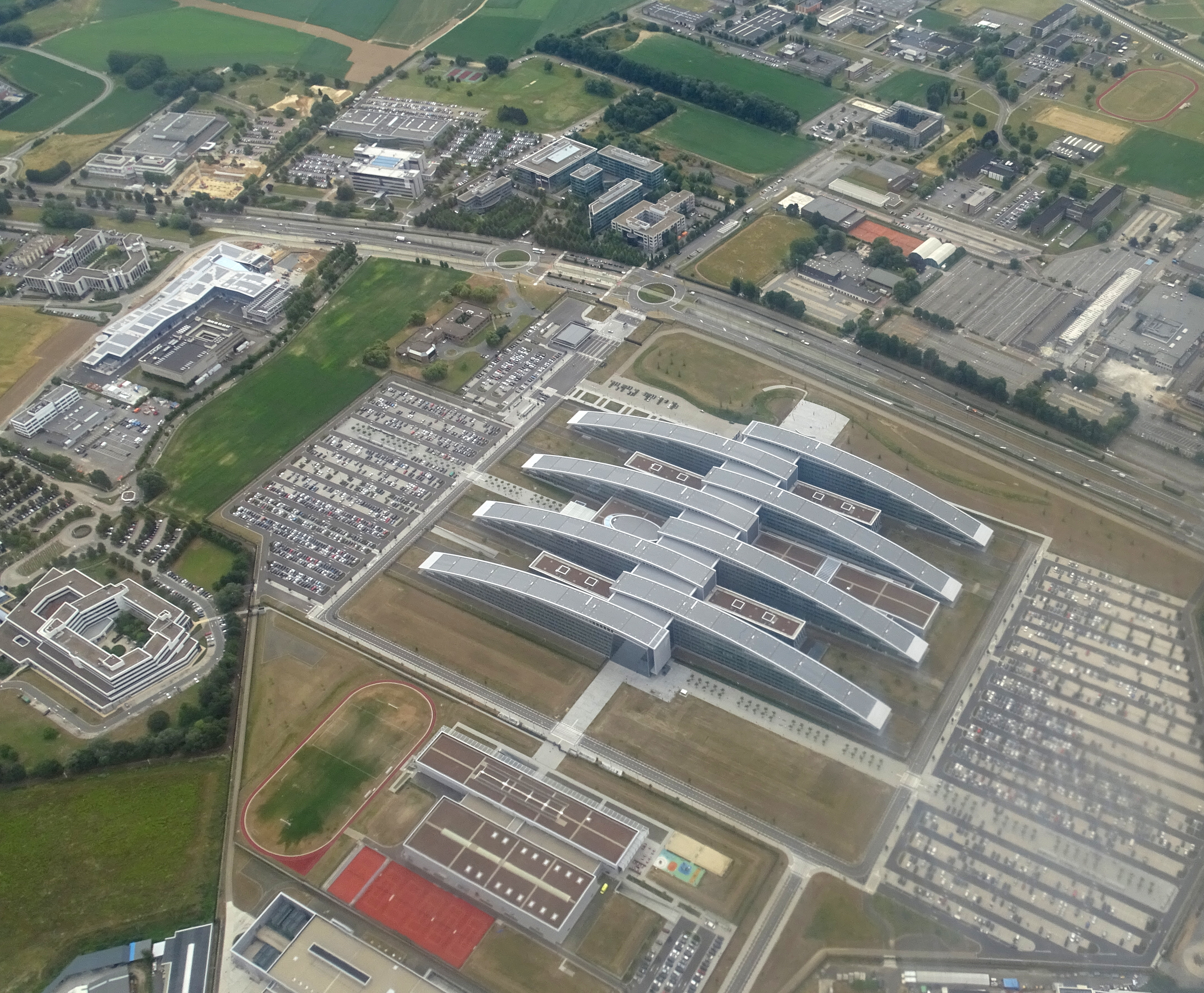
North Atlantic Treaty Organization (NATO) headquarters in Brussels, Belgium. The United Kingdom is a leading power in the world's most powerful military alliance.

== See also ==
- List of wars involving England
- List of wars involving Scotland
- List of wars in Great Britain
- Military history of the United Kingdom
- Declaration of war by the United Kingdom
