= List of wars involving Scotland =

This is a list of wars involving the Kingdom of Scotland before the creation of the Kingdom of Great Britain by the Acts of Union 1707, including clan conflicts, civil wars, and rebellions. For dates after 1708, see List of wars involving the United Kingdom.

Clan conflict
Scottish victory
Scottish defeat
Another result *

*e.g. a treaty or peace without a clear result, status quo ante bellum, result unknown or indecisive, inconclusive

== 10th and 11th centuries ==
Conflict	Scotland & allies	Scotland's opposition	Result
Battle of Dollar (875) Location: Dollar, Scotland	Kingdom of Scotland	Vikings	Scottish defeat
Athelstan's invasion of Scotland (934) Location: Whole of Scotland Portrait of Constantine II, leader of the Scottish forces against Athelstan's invading army	Kingdom of Scotland	Kingdom of England Kingdom of Deheubarth Kingdom of Gwynedd	Inconclusive: Militarily inconclusive; Constantine acknowledges Æthelstan's overlordship
Battle of Brunanburh (c. 937) Location: Unknown; probably Northern England	Kingdom of Scotland Kingdom of Dublin Kingdom of Strathclyde	Kingdom of England	Scottish defeat
Battle of Bauds (c. 962) Location: Cullen, Scotland	Kingdom of Scotland	Kingdom of Norway	Scottish victory
Siege of Durham (c. 1006) Location: Durham, England	Kingdom of Scotland	Kingdom of England	Scottish defeat
Battle of Carham (c. 1010s prob. 1018) Location: River Tweed	Kingdom of Scotland Kingdom of Strathclyde	Kingdom of England	Scottish victory: Lothian and the region north of Berwick integrated fully into Scotland
Annexation of Strathclyde (c. 1034) Location: Strathclyde Dumbarton Rock, chief fortress of the old Kingdom of Strathclyde	Kingdom of Scotland Kingdom of England	Kingdom of Strathclyde	Scottish victory
Invasion of Northumbria (1039-1040) Location: Northumbria 17th century portrait of Duncan I, leader of the Scottish forces who would die a year later in battle with Macbeth	Kingdom of Scotland	Kingdom of England	Scottish defeat at Siege of Durham (1040)
Battle of Dunsinane (1054) Location: Dunsinane Hill	Kingdom of Scotland	Kingdom of England	Scottish defeat
Norman invasion of Scotland (1072) Part of the Norman conquest of Britain Location: Scottish Borders and Northumbria Abernethy village, where the peace treaty declaring William I Scotland's overlord was signed	Kingdom of Scotland	Kingdom of England	Treaty of Abernethy: Scottish defeat with Scottish attacks on Northumbria repelled; Malcolm III forced to submit to William the Conqueror, though makes subsequent raids once the Norman king returns south
English invasion of Cumbria (1092) Location: Cumbria	Kingdom of Scotland	Kingdom of England	Scottish defeat: Cumbria is annexed into the Kingdom of England
Invasion of Northumbria (1093) Location: Northumbria	Kingdom of Scotland	Kingdom of England	Scottish defeat at the Battle of Alnwick

== 12th century ==
Conflict	Scotland & allies	Scotland's opposition	Result
Óengus's invasion of Scotland (1130) Location: Angus David I, King of Scotland in 1130. At the time of Óengus the pretender's invasion, he was serving as a judge at Henry I's court in England	Kingdom of Scotland	Kingdom of Moray Kingdom of Ross	Scottish victory: King Óengus of Moray killed in battle, while Máel Coluim mac Alaxandair (King of Ross) imprisoned for life
Anglo-Scottish war (1136-1139) Location: Northern England	Kingdom of Scotland	Kingdom of England	Scottish victory: Treaty of Durham (1139); David's son Henry is given the earldom of Northumberland; Stephen recognises the independence of Scotland
Somairle's invasion of Scotland (1164) Location: Renfrewshire Stained glass window in Glasgow Bute Hall depicting Saint Kentigern, who supposedly led the Scots to divine victory over the Islemen	Kingdom of Scotland	Kingdom of the Isles Kingdom of Dublin	Scottish victory: King Somairle of the Isles killed in battle, leading to mass destabilisation and war in his kingdom
Revolt of 1173–74 Location: England, Normandy, Scottish Borders, Brittany, and Flanders Alnwick, market town in Northumberland where William I of Scotland was captured by supposed 'divine providence'	English Rebels under Eleanor of Aquitaine Kingdom of Scotland Kingdom of France Duchy of Brittany County of Flanders County of Boulogne	English Royalists loyal to Henry II	Scottish defeat: Decisive defeat of rebel forces at Battle of Alnwick; Scottish King William the Lion taken as prisoner of war in England

== 13th century ==
Conflict	Scotland & allies	Scotland's opposition	Result
First Barons' War (1215-1217) Location: England	Kingdom of Scotland Army of God and Holy Church Kingdom of France	Kingdom of England	Scottish defeat: Treaty of Lambeth
Haakon Haakonsson's campaign in Scotland (1230-1231) Location: Hebrides, scotland and The Minch	Kingdom of Scotland	Kingdom of Norway Kingdom of the Isles	Scottish defeat: Norwegians attack, lays siege and sack Rothesay Castle
Battle of Embo (1245) Location: Embo, Sutherland, Scotland	Kingdom of Scotland	Denmark; Norway	Scottish victory
Scottish–Norwegian War (1262–1266) Location: Hebrides and the Scottish West Coast Coronation of Alexander III, who revived his father (Alexander II)'s ambitions to conquer the Western Isles - beginning the Scottish-Norwegian War	Kingdom of Scotland	Kingdom of Norway Kingdom of the Isles Earldom of Orkney	Treaty of Perth: Favourable outcome for Scotland; Hebrides and Isle of Man bought from Norway for 4,000 marks to become part of Scotland; Norwegian sovereignty recognised over Orkney and Shetland
First War of Scottish Independence (1296–1328) Location: Scotland, England, and Ireland Robert the Bruce addressing his troops before Bannockburn (drawing from c. 1900)	Kingdom of Scotland Supported by: Kingdom of France Kingdom of Thomond Kingdom of Uí Maine Kingdom of Tyrconnell Kingdom of West Breifne Kingdom of Desmond Kingdom of Magh Luirg Kingdom of Oriel	Kingdom of England Lordship of Ireland	Scottish victory, ending English military occupation in the country: De facto independence won in 1314 at Battle of Bannockburn; Treaty of Edinburgh–Northampton: Peace treaty signed and ratified by Scottish and English Parliaments in 1328; Bruce family established as the new Scottish royal line; Border re-established roughly where it is today; Humiliation to English nobles and families prompting Second War of Independence only 5 years later

== 14th century ==
Conflict	Scotland & allies	Scotland's opposition	Result
Second War of Scottish Independence (1332–1357) Location: Scotland The Battle of Neville's Cross, a heavy defeat for invading Scottish forces in which King David II was captured and held hostage for 11 years	Kingdom of Scotland Kingdom of France	Kingdom of England Supporters of Edward Balliol	Scottish victory with end of English claims to the country's sovereignty Treaty of Berwick (1357): Scotland forced to pay 20,000 marks in ransom fees to reclaim David II (captive in England); 14-year truce established between Scotland and England
Hundred Years' War (1337–1453) Location: France, the Low Countries, Great Britain, and the Iberian Peninsula 19th-century painting of the Battle of Poitiers, in which Scottish troops were led by William,1st Earl of Douglas	Kingdom of Scotland Kingdom of France Crown of Castile Republic of Genoa Kingdom of Bohemia Crown of Aragon	Kingdom of England Duchy of Burgundy Duchy of Brittany (Montfort) Kingdom of Portugal Kingdom of Navarre Flanders Hainaut Luxembourg	Scottish victory: Scots played a key role in this conflict after the battle of Agincourt, forming a large part of French armies in this period that changed the course of the war; Battle of Homildon Hill ends in decisive English victory; Battle of Sark Ends in decisive Scottish victory in the north, coinciding with victory on the continent in France; English victory in the Edwardian War French victory in the Caroline War and the Lancastrian War
Anglo-Scottish Wars (1377–1575) Location: Scottish Borders and Northern England A 14th-century illustration depicting an English herald arriving on Scottish troops	Kingdom of Scotland	Kingdom of England	Series of border skirmishes resulting in stalemate

== 15th century ==
Conflict	Scotland & allies	Scotland's opposition	Result
Glyndŵr rebellion: Battle of Shrewsbury; (1400–1416) Location: Wales, England	Kingdom of Scotland; Welsh rebels Percy family Duchy of Brittany; Kingdom of France	Kingdom of England	Scottish defeat: English victory; Status quo ante bellum

== 16th century ==
Conflict	Scotland & allies	Scotland's opposition	Result
War of the League of Cambrai (1511–1513) Location: Scottish Borders 16th century depiction of Battle of Flodden, showing Scottish pikeman battling with English halberdiers	Kingdom of Scotland France Duchy of Ferrara	Kingdom of England Papal States Venice Holy Roman Empire Spain Swiss mercenaries	Scottish defeat: Decisive loss at the Battle of Flodden with the death of James IV of Scotland; However, French and Venetian victory overall
The Rough Wooing (1543–1550) Location: Scottish Borders River Esk, site of the Battle of Solway Moss, a heavy loss for Scottish troops during which thousands drowned after an English ambush	Kingdom of Scotland Kingdom of France	Kingdom of England	Scottish victory: Treaty of Norham ends English military occupation in border regions, as well as returns hostages and grants Scotland full fishing rights to the River Tweed

== Civil wars and revolutions ==
Conflict	Scottish Government	Rebels	Result
Invasion of Moray (1040) Location: Moray Fields at Pitgaveny (then known as Bothnagowan), near Elgin, where King Duncan was slain	Kingdom of Scotland	Supporters of Macbeth Kingdom of Moray	Civil war, victory of Macbeth: Death of Duncan I at Battle of Bothnagowan
Dubh's First Rebellion (1501–1505) Location: Scottish Hebrides Achnashellach Forest, site of the final Battle of Achnashellach, where Clan Cameron, loyal to the Lord of the Isles won, before Domnall Dubh was captured by royal forces	Kingdom of Scotland	Lord of the Isles Clan Donald	Civil war, Royalist victory
Dubh's Second Rebellion (1545) Location: Scottish Hebrides Drogheda, Ireland, where the rebellion's leader Domhnall Dubh died, destroying the Hebrides' final hopes of independence	Kingdom of Scotland	Lord of the Isles Clan Donald Kingdom of England	Civil war, Royalist victory
Marian Civil War (1568–1573) Location: Scotland 16th century illustration of the "Lang Siege" of Edinburgh, lasting from 1571 to 1573 and ending with supporters of James VI taking the castle	Supporters of Mary, Queen of Scots	Supporters of James VI, Mary's son Kingdom of England	Civil war, victory of James VI: Imprisonment of Mary before her flight to England
Bishops' Wars (1639–1640) Location: Scottish Lowlands Signing of the National Covenant in Greyfriars Kirkyard, Edinburgh, prompting a religious civil war and rebellion in Scotland	Scottish Royalists Kingdom of England	Scottish Covenanters	Civil war, Covenanter victory
Second English Civil War (1648) Location: Northern England Schematics of the Battle of Preston, a decisive Scottish loss under the Duke of Hamilton which brought an end to the Second English Civil War	Scottish Royalists Scottish Engagers	Parliamentarians	Civil war, Parliamentarian victory: Decisive loss at the Battle of Preston (1648); Execution of Charles I
Third English Civil War (1649–1651) Location: Scottish Lowlands and Northern England Modern re-enactment of musketeers at the Battle of Inverkeithing, during Oliver Cromwell's invasion of Scotland	Scottish Royalists Scottish Covenanters	Parliamentarians	Civil war, Parliamentarian victory: Exile of Charles II; Establishment of the republican Commonwealth under Oliver Cromwell
Glorious Revolution (1688–1689) The Prince of Orange landing at Torbay as depicted in an illustration by Jan Hoynck van Papendrecht	(Kingdom of Scotland) James VII	William of Orange; Dutch military forces British military forces	Internal conflict: James VII replaced as king by his daughter Mary II and her husband William III
Jacobite rebellions (1689–1746) Location: Scotland, England, and Ireland Modern depiction of the Battle of Dunkeld, fought between Highland Jacobites in support of James II and Covenanters in support of William III	Scottish Williamites (Kingdom of Scotland) Scotland (until 1707) (Kingdom of Great Britain) Great Britain (from 1707)	Scottish Jacobites	Civil war, Williamite victory: Williamite War in Ireland (1688–91) – The Battle of the Boyne saw the last battle between two rival claimants for the throne; Jacobite rising of 1689 (1689-92) - resulting in Massacre of Glencoe; Jacobite rising of 1715 (1715–16); Jacobite rising of 1719 (1719); Jacobite rising of 1745 (1741–1746) – Jacobite restoration attempt defeated

=== Clan conflicts ===
Conflict	Clan 1	Clan 2	Result
Clan MacDougall-Clan Campbell feud Part of the First War of Scottish Independence (c. 1294) Location: Loch Awe Loch Awe, site of the decisive clan battle, with Kilchurn Castle (seat of Clan Campbell) on the left	Clan MacDougall	Clan Campbell	Clan conflict: Clan MacDougall victory at the Battle of Red Ford, with heavy casualties on either side; Ford ran "red with blood"
Clan Cameron-Clan Mackintosh feud (c. 1330–1688) Location: Lochaber and Southeastern Highlands Druim Gleann Laoigh, likely site of clan's first battle - fought over rival land claims	Clan Cameron	Clan Mackintosh	Clan Conflict: Various clan battles and skirmishes over the centuries, with no overall winner; Ended in Battle of Mulroy, a Clan Cameron victory (allied with Clan MacDonald of Keppoch), after which clan warfare largely ceased in Scotland
Wolf of Badenoch feuds (1391) Location: Angus Glen Brierachan, site of the final stand-off between the Stewarts' raiding party and the Sheriff of Angus	Clan Stewart of Buchan Clan Robertson Clan Mackay	Clan Ogilvy Clan Lindsay Clan Gray	Clan conflict, Clan Stewart victory: Lands of Angus burnt, homes sacked and civilians slaughtered; Elgin Cathedral burnt to the ground
Clan Mackay-Clan Gunn feud (1426–1517) Location: Caithness and Sutherland Strath of Harpsdale, site of the first clan battle between Mackay and Gunn and a "great slaughter on either side"	Clan Mackay Supported by: Clan Keith Clan Ross	Clan Gunn Supported by: Clan Matheson	Clan conflict: Various clan battles and skirmishes throughout the 15th century, with no overall winner; Ended in Battle of Torran Dubh, a Gunn victory, after which the two feuding clans allied against Clan Sinclair
Royal-Black Douglas feud (1440–1526) Location: Galloway, Scottish Borders, and West Lothian King James II of Scotland, who spent his early adulthood and reign in an intense power struggle with the Earls of Douglas	Royalists loyal to House of Stewart	Rebels allied to Black Douglases	Clan conflict, victory for House of Stewart: Eventual exile of the leaders of Clan Douglas after the Battle of Linlithgow Bridge
Clan Gordon-Clan Lindsay feud (1445–1452) Location: Angus Arbroath Abbey, site of the first battle between Clans Gordon and Lindsay, which later tied into the Royal-Black Douglas feud	Clan Gordon Supported by: Clan Ogilvy	Clan Lindsay	Clan conflict: Two clan battles: the first won by Clan Lindsay, the second, as part of the Royal-Black Douglas Civil War, Clan Gordon
Clan Munro-Clan Mackenzie feud (1452–1715) Location: Ross Ben Wyvis, below which the first battle between Clans Munro and Mackenzie took place to determine control over Ross	Clan Munro Supported by: Clan Fraser of Lovat	Clan Mackenzie	Clan conflict: Various clan battles and skirmishes over the centuries, with no overall winner; Ended in Siege of Brahan during the Jacobite rising of 1715, when Clan Munro, loyal to the British Government, forced the Jacobite Mackenzies to surrender. Clan warfare largely ceased after this period
Clan Fraser of Lovat-Clan Mackenzie feud (1452–1715) Location: Ross Beauly Priory, the lands of which saw many border disputes between Clans Fraser of Lovat and Mackenzie	Clan Fraser of Lovat Supported by: Clan Munro	Clan Mackenzie	Clan conflict: Various clan battles and skirmishes over the centuries, with no overall winner; Ended in Siege of Brahan during the Jacobite rising of 1715, when Clan Fraser, loyal to the British Government, forced the Jacobite Mackenzies to surrender. Clan warfare largely ceased after this period
Clan Munro-Clan Mackintosh feud (1454–1719) Location: Inverness-shire Monument in Clachnaharry to the first battle between Clans Munro and Mackintosh after a dispute between the two over a "road collop" (passage money)	Clan Munro	Clan Mackintosh	Clan conflict: Two clan battles and a perpetuated rivalry, ending after the Battle of Glen Shiel when Clan Mackintosh sided with the British Government, and Clan Munro the losing Jacobites
Clan Gunn-Clan Keith feud (1464–c. 1478) Location: Caithness Coast north of Wick, on which a trial by combat took place in 1478 deciding the Gunn-Keith feud once and for all	Clan Gunn	Clan Keith	Clan conflict: Two clan battles ending in a Keith victory at the Battle of Champions; A treaty of friendship was signed by the clans in 1978, after 300 years of peace
Clan Mackay-Clan Ross feud (c. 1480–1550) Location: Ross and Sutherland Tarbat Old Church, built on the ruins of the church Clan Ross burnt with members of Clan Mackay sheltering inside	Clan Mackay	Clan Ross	Clan conflict: Various clan battles and skirmishes largely in the 1480s, with no overall winner; Ended in a 1550 raid (and massacre) by Clan Mackay on Clan Ross
Clan MacDonald-Clan Maclean feud (c. 1480–1598) Location: Lochaber and Inner Hebrides Bloody Bay, site of a father-son battle within Clan Donald of which Clan Maclean took the father's side	Various branches of Clan Donald	Clan Maclean	Clan conflict: Various clan battles and skirmishes largely in the 16th century, with no overall winner; Ended in Battle of Benbigrie, a Clan Maclean victory
Clan MacDonald-Clan Mackenzie feud (c. 1480–1602) Location: Ross Five Sisters of Kintail, one of several sites in Ross where Clans Donald and Mackenzie clashed	Clan Donald	Clan Mackenzie Supported by: Clan Mackay Clan Fraser of Lovat Clan Ross	Clan conflict: Various clan battles and skirmishes largely in the 1480s, with no overall winner; Ended in a tactical draw at Battle of Morar, after which both families agreed a peace
Clan Cunningham-Clan Montgomery feud (1488–1586) Location: Ayrshire Kerelaw Castle, seat of Clan Cunningham; sacked and burned by Clan Montgomery in 1488	Clan Cunningham	Clan Montgomery	Clan conflict: Various clan battles and skirmishes, as well as several high-profile murders, with no overall winner
Clan Mackay-Clan Sutherland feud (1517–1590) Location: Sutherland Torran Dubh, the site of the first battle between Clan Mackay and Sutherland	Clan Mackay	Clan Sutherland Clan Gordon	Clan conflict: Various clan battles and skirmishes throughout the 16th century, with no overall winner; Ended in Battle of Clynetradwell, after which Clan Sutherland turned their attentions on Clan Sinclair
Clan Sutherland-Clan Sinclair feud (1570–1601) Location: Sutherland Dornoch Castle, besieged by supporters of Clan Sinclair in 1570, three members of Clan Murray (supporters of Clan Sutherland) being beheaded after surrendering a week later	Clan Sutherland	Clan Sinclair	Clan conflict: Various clan battles and skirmishes resulting in Clan Sinclair surrendering in the Stand-off at Bengrime

== See also ==
- List of battles involving the Kingdom of Scotland
- List of wars in Great Britain
- Military history of Scotland
- List of wars involving the United Kingdom
