= Norman conquest (disambiguation) =

The Norman Conquest was the 11th-century invasion and occupation of England by an army led by William the Conqueror.

Norman conquest or Norman invasion may also refer to:

== Invasions by Normans ==
- Norman conquest of southern Italy, 999 to 1139
- Byzantine–Norman wars
- Norman invasion of Wales
- Norman invasion of Malta, 1091
- Norman Kingdom of Africa
- Anglo-Norman invasion of Ireland (began 1169)
- Conquest of the Canary Islands § Norman conquest, 1402 to 1412

== Invasions of Normandy ==
The Invasion of Normandy beginning with D-Day was a successful Allied landing operation in 1944 into northern France from England during World War II.

== Other uses ==
- Norman Conquest (soccer) (1916–1968), Australian soccer goalkeeper
- Norman Conquest (film), a 1953 film
- The Norman Conquests, a 1973 trilogy of plays by Alan Ayckbourn
- Harold or the Norman Conquest, 1895 opera by Frederic H. Cowen and Edward Malet
- Norman Conquest, a mystery novel series by Edwy Searles Brooks

== See also ==
- Normans#Conquests and military offensives
