= Military history of the United Kingdom =

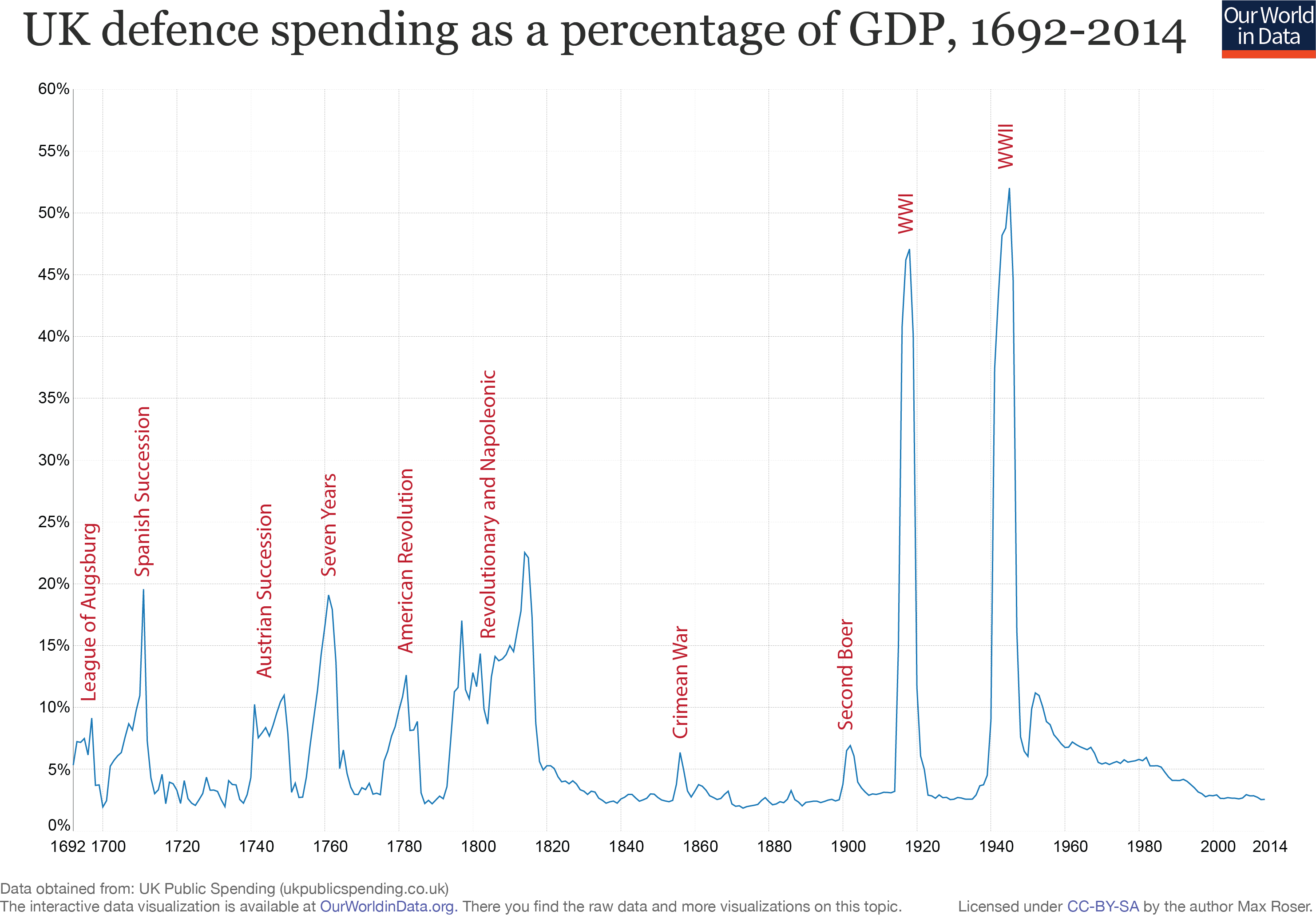
Defence spending in the UK

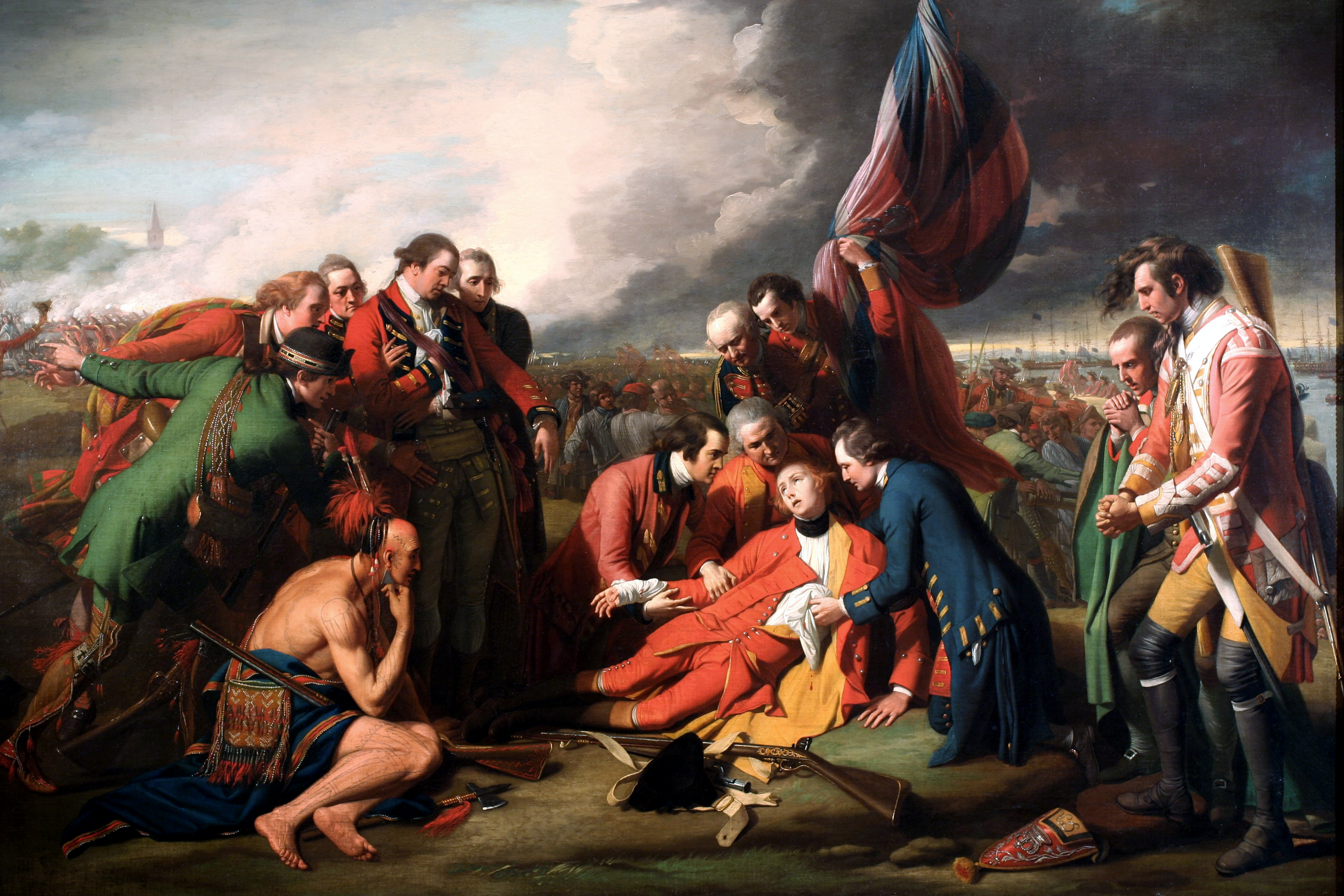
The Death of General Wolfe

The military history of the United Kingdom covers the period from the creation of the united Kingdom of Great Britain, with the political union of England and Scotland in 1707, to the present day.

From the 18th century onwards, with the expansion of the British Empire and the country's industrial strength, the British military became one of the most powerful and technologically advanced militaries in Europe and the world. Scottish regiments and in particular Highland regiments, made a significant contribution to the military expansion, history and maintenance of the British Empire in the 19th and 20th centuries. The Royal navy in particular, with major bases in four Imperial fortresses and coaling stations surrounding the globe, was the world's greatest naval force from the 18th to the mid-20th century. British military declined in the mid-20th century as did those of the traditional European continental powers following the two world wars, decolonisation, and the rise of the United States and the Soviet Union as the new superpowers. However, Britain remains a major military power with frequent military interventions around the world since the end of the Cold War in 1991. The present-day British Armed Forces encompass the Royal Navy, the British Army, and the Royal Air Force.

Britain has been involved in a great many armed conflicts since the union in 1707, on all continents except for Antarctica.

== 18th century ==
- War of the Spanish Succession (1702–13) - England and Scotland, later Great Britain, Holy Roman Empire, Portugal and the Dutch Republic, were allied against France and Spain.
  - Queen Anne's War (1702–13)
- Jacobite Rebellions (1715–16; 1719; 1745–46) - Civil War
  - Clifton Moor Skirmish, near Penrith (1745) - last land battle in England
  - Battle of Culloden (1746) - last land battle in Britain.
- War of the Quadruple Alliance (1718–20) - Great Britain, France, Austria and the Dutch Republic v. Italy and Spain
- Anglo-Spanish War (1727–1729)
- War of Jenkins' Ear (1739–42) - Great Britain v. Spain.
- War of the Austrian Succession (1742–48) - Great Britain, Austria and the Dutch Republic v. France and Germany
- Seven Years' War (1756–63) - the first "world war"
  - French and Indian War & Seven Years' War is the same War (1754–63) - Great Britain, Hanover, Portugal, and Prussia
  - Anglo-Cherokee War (1758–61) - Britain v. Cherokee nation
- Pontiac's War (1763–66) - Britain v. American Indian coalition
- First Anglo-Mysore War (1766–69) - Britain v. Kingdom of Mysore
- American Revolutionary War (1775–83) - Britain v. United States, France, Netherlands & Spain
- First Anglo-Maratha War (1775–82) - Britain v. Maratha Empire
- Fourth Anglo-Dutch War (1780–84) - Britain v. the Dutch Republic
- Second Anglo-Mysore War (1780–84) - India
- Third Anglo-Mysore War (1789–92) - India
- Australian frontier wars (1788–1930s) - Britain v. Australian Aborigines
- French Revolutionary Wars (1793–1802) - Great Britain, Austria, Spain, Russia and Germany v. France
  - War of the First Coalition (1793–97)
  - War of the Second Coalition (1798–1801)
- Fourth Anglo-Mysore War (1798–99) - India
- Irish Rebellion (1798) - Britain v. United Irishmen and France.

== 19th century ==
- Australian frontier wars (1788–1930s)
- French Revolutionary Wars (1793–1802) - Great Britain, Austria, Spain, Russia, Prussia, French Royalists v. French Revolutionaries
  - War of the First Coalition (1793–97)
  - War of the Second Coalition (1798–1801)
- Napoleonic Wars (1803–15) - United Kingdom, Prussia, Austria, Sweden, Spain, Portugal and Russia v. France
  - South American War (1806–07)
  - Anglo-Turkish War (1807–09)
  - Anglo-Russian War (1807–12)
  - Gunboat War (1807–14)
  - Peninsular War (1808–14)
  - Hundred Days (1815)
- First Kandyan War (1803–04) - Sri Lanka
- Second Anglo-Maratha War (1803–05) - India
- Vellore Mutiny (1806) - India
- War of 1812 (1812–15) - Britain v. United States.
- Anglo-Nepalese War (1814–16)
- Second Kandyan War (1815) - Sri Lanka
- Third Anglo-Maratha War (1817–18) - India
- Anglo-Ashanti wars (1823–1900) - Ghana
- First Anglo-Burmese War (1824–26)
- Upper Canada Rebellion (1837)
- Lower Canada Rebellion (1837)
- Syrian War (1839–40)
- First Anglo-Afghan War (1839–42)
  - Battle of Ghazni
- First Opium War (1839–42) - United Kingdom v. China
- Gwalior campaign (1843)
- First Anglo-Sikh War (1845–46) - India
- New Zealand Wars (1843–1872)
- Second Anglo-Sikh War (1848–49) - India
- Second Anglo-Burmese War (1852–53)
- Crimean War (1854–56) - United Kingdom, France, Ottoman Empire, and Piedmont-Sardinia v. Russia
- Second Opium War (1856–60) - United Kingdom and France v. China
- Anglo-Persian War (1856–57) - United Kingdom and Persia
- Indian Rebellion (1857)
- Pig War (1859) - United Kingdom v. US
- Anglo-Bhutanese War (1865)
- Expedition to Abyssinia (1868)
- Second Anglo-Afghan War (1878–80)
- Anglo-Zulu War (1879)
- First Boer War (1880–81)
- Gun War (1880–81)
- Mahdist War (1881–99)
- Third Anglo-Burmese War (1885)
- Sikkim Expedition (1888)
- Lumboka-Chetambe War (1894-95)
- Anglo-Zanzibar War (1896)
- Tirah Campaign (1897–98)
- Second Boer War (1899–1902)
- Boxer Rebellion (1900) - United Kingdom, Austria-Hungary, France, Germany, Italy, Japan, Russia, US, and China

== 20th century ==
- Anglo-Aro war (1901–02) - Nigeria.
- British expedition to Tibet (1903–04)
- World War I (1914–18) - Britain, France, Belgium, Serbia, Italy, Russia, United States vs Germany, Austria-Hungary, Bulgaria and Ottoman Empire.
  - Aviation in World War I
- Easter Rising (1916) - Ireland
- Allied intervention in the Russian Civil War (1918–22)
- Third Anglo-Afghan War (1919)
- Anglo-Irish War (1919–21)
- World War II (1939–45) see Military history of the United Kingdom during World War II
  - Air warfare of World War II
  - Pacific War (1937–45)
  - Anglo-Iraqi War (1941)
- British–Zionist conflict of Palestine (1945–48)
- Greek Civil War (1946–47)
- Cold War (1946–90)
- Malayan Emergency (1948–60)
- Korean War (1950–53) see United Kingdom in the Korean War
- Mau Mau Uprising (1952–60)
- Cyprus Emergency (1955–59)
- Suez Crisis (1956)
- Brunei Revolt (1962)
- Dhofar Rebellion (1962–75)
- Indonesia-Malaysia confrontation (1963–66)
- Aden Emergency (1963–67)
- Northern Ireland Troubles (1969–mid-1990s)
- Cod War Confrontation (1975–76)
- Soviet–Afghan War (1979–89) see United Kingdom in the Soviet–Afghan War
- Iranian Embassy Siege (1980)
- Falklands War (1982)
- Gulf War (1990–91)
- Bosnian War (1992–96)
- Operation Desert Fox (1998)
- Kosovo War (1999)

== 21st century ==
- Sierra Leone Civil War (2000)
- War on terror
  - War in Afghanistan (2001–2021)
  - Iraq War (2003–11)
  - Somali Civil War (2009–present)
  - Boko Haram insurgency (2012–present)
  - Northern Mali conflict (2013–present)
  - Military intervention against ISIS (2014–present)
- Libyan Civil War (2011)
- Syrian Civil War (2018)

== List of civil wars ==
1. Jacobite Rebellions (1715–16; 1719; 1745–46) - the last civil war in Great Britain
  - Clifton Moor Skirmish, near Penrith (1745) - the last land battle on English soil
  - Battle of Culloden (1746) - the last land battle in Great Britain

== See also ==
- List of all military equipment current and former of the United Kingdom
- Declaration of war by the United Kingdom
- History of the British Army
- History of the Royal Navy
- History of the Royal Marines
- History of the Royal Air Force
- History of the foreign relations of the United Kingdom
- List of wars involving Great Britain
- List of wars in Great Britain
- Military history of England
- Military history of Scotland
- Military history of Ireland
- Military history of the United Kingdom during World War II
- Timeline of British diplomatic history
- French and Indian Wars
