= Militarized interstate dispute =

Sub-war conflict between sovereign states

Militarized interstate disputes (MIDs) are conflicts between states that do not involve a full-scale war. These include any conflicts in which one or more states threaten, display, or use force against one or more other states. They can vary in intensity from threats of force to actual combat short of war. A MID is composed of a sequence of related militarized incidents, all but the first being an outgrowth of or response to a previous militarized incident. An initiator of a war need not necessarily be the same as the initiator of a preceding MID, since a MID can be started by a show of force, whereas the initiator of a war begins the actual combat. Under this definition, over 2,400 MIDs have been identified from 1816 to 2014 in the Correlates of War project.

For example, although the 2003 invasion of Iraq by the United States-led coalition would be considered a full-scale war, the bombings and disputes related to American, British, and (until 1996) French control of the Iraqi no-fly zone in the 1990s are described by Frank Wayman as a MID.

== Research ==
Some of the findings from research on MIDs:

- Research using a continuous measure of democracy shows that the most democratic nations have few MIDs with one another. There is an ongoing debate regarding whether it is the most authoritarian or the intermediate regimes that have the most MIDs.
- When examining these MIDs in more detail, the disputes between democracies have on the average more hostility, but are less likely to involve third parties, hostility is less likely to be reciprocated, when reciprocated the response is usually proportional to the provocation, and the disputes are less likely to cause any loss of life.
- Enduring militarized competition between democratic states is rare. After both states have become democratic, there is a decreasing probability for MIDs within a year and this decreases almost to zero within five years.
- Democracies do sometimes attack nondemocracies. Many earlier papers found that democracies in general are as warlike as nondemocracies, but according to several recent papers democracies are overall slightly less involved in war, initiate wars and MIDs less frequently than nondemocracies, and tend more frequently to seek negotiated resolutions.
- Most MIDs by democracies since 1950 have involved four nations: the United States, the United Kingdom, Israel, and India.
- MIDs between Western democracies occur to a large degree over maritime territory as opposed to land territory.

== The CoW Militarized Interstate Dispute (MID) dataset ==
The Correlates of War (CoW) Militarized Interstate Dispute (MID) dataset is the most extensive dataset on MIDs, and has been the basis of much of the published research on MIDs.

Some studies have characterized the dataset as flawed. A 2012 study found that the dataset "often coded incorrectly" the outcomes of disputes where threats of force were issued, with implications for research on the democratic peace and audience costs. A 2017 study found that the coding in the dataset was deeply flawed with significant effects on the findings of studies that relied on the dataset:

After strictly applying MID coding rules, we recommend dropping 251 cases (or over 10% of the dataset), as either we were unable to find a militarized incident in the historical record or the dispute appeared elsewhere in the data. We found evidence linking 75 disputes to other cases, and we could not identify 19 cases in the historical record. Among the remaining disputes, we recommend major changes (changes in dispute year, fatality level, and participants) in 234 disputes and minor changes in 1,009 disputes. Though we identified several systematic problems with the original coding effort, we also find that these problems do not affect current understandings of what predicts the onset of interstate conflict. However, estimates in our replications of three recent studies of dispute escalation, dispute duration, and dispute reciprocation all witness substantial changes when using corrected data—to the point of reversing previous conclusions in some cases.

== See also ==
- War
- Democratic peace theory
