= List of wars in Great Britain =

This is a list of wars occurring on the island of Great Britain.

Year(s)	Conflict	Location (modern)	Notes	Result	Ref.
55–54 BC	Julius Caesar's invasions of Britain	England	Small scale explorative incursions into Britain.	Roman tributaries set up in a limited area.	
49–96 AD	Roman conquest of Britain	Great Britain	Full scale invasion started by Claudius, led mostly by Gnaeus Julius Agricola.	Roman Empire conquers Britain from the Celtic Britons creating the Roman province of Britannica.	
208–11	Roman invasion of Caledonia (208–211)	Scotland	Septimius Severus tries to retake lands first won by Agricola.	Caracalla brings frontier back to Hadrian's Wall but stops Caledonian raids.	
286–96	Carausian revolt	England	Carausius declares himself Emperor of Britain.	Constantius Chlorus re-establishes Roman power after seven years.	
367–68	Great Conspiracy	Great Britain	Barbarian tribes take advantage of Rome's weakness in Britain.	Theodosius the Elder re-establishes order, strengthening Roman power in Britain creating Valentia.	
410–927	Anglo-Saxon settlement of Britain	Great Britain	The development of Anglo-Saxon culture and identity.	Assimilation of culture and language into Old English.	
865–78	Invasion of the Great Heathen Army	England	14 years of warfare led by Halfdan Ragnarsson, Ivar the Boneless and Ubba against English kingdoms.	Danelaw established in areas of Northern and Eastern England.	
1015–16	Cnut's invasion of England	England	The last successful act of Viking activity in the British Isles.	Cnut becomes King of England	
1066–71	Norman Conquest	England	Normans take Anglo-Saxon England.	Death of the last English king, Harold Godwinson, William the Conqueror becomes King of England	
1067–1194	Norman invasion of Wales	Wales	Sporadic Norman incursions into Wales. List of Anglo-Welsh wars	Henry II of England gains homage from Rhys ap Gruffydd, Owain Gwynedd and Malcolm IV of Scotland.	
1075	Revolt of the Earls	England	Last failed revolt against William the Conqueror led by Ralph de Gael .	William banishes Ralph.	
1088	Rebellion of 1088	England	Fallout after William I dies, as rebels try to keep Normandy and England together.	William II of England defeats Odo of Bayeux who is banished for life.	
1135–54	The Anarchy	England	Stephen of Blois and Empress Matilda vie for the English throne after Henry I's death.	Treaty of Wallingford allowing Stephen to reign with Matilda's son, the future Henry II of England as his heir.	
1173–74	Revolt of 1173–1174	England	Rebellion against Henry II led by three of his sons and his wife Eleanor of Aquitaine	Rebellion halted, Eleanor imprisoned and the Treaty of Montlouis with Henry reconciling with his sons.	
1211	Welsh uprising of 1211	Wales	Led by Llywelyn ab Iorwerth, Gwenwynwyn ab Owain Cyfeiliog, Maelgwn ap Rhys, and Madog ap Gruffudd Maelor against John, King of England.	Peace signed- rebellion nominally defeated but Wales enjoys greater autonomy	
1215–17	First Barons' War	England	A rebellion over the Magna Carta led by Robert Fitzwalter against John, King of England turns into a grab for the English throne by Louis VIII of France.	The break up of the Angevin Empire but 9 year old Henry III of England keeps the English throne.	
1262–66	Scottish–Norwegian War	Scotland	Alexander III of Scotland declares he will retake the Hebrides from Haakon IV.	Alexander wins the Hebrides and the Isle of Man, Magnus the Lawmender of Norway retains Shetland and Orkney with the Treaty of Perth.	
1264–67	Second Barons' War	England	Simon de Montfort forces the Provisions of Oxford onto Henry III of England.	Simon is killed, Henry reasserts his power and annuls Oxford with the Dictum of Kenilworth.	
1277; 1282–83	Conquest of Wales by Edward I	Wales	Edward I of England finalises the Norman control of Wales against Llywelyn ap Gruffudd the last independent Prince of Wales.	Principality of Wales, created, Parliament of England expanded to pay for it. Edward I rules both.	
1296–1328	First War of Scottish Independence (Wars of Scottish Independence)	Scotland; England; Ireland	In retaliation to the Auld Alliance, Edward I invades Scotland under John Balliol.	Robert the Bruce gains independence from Edward III with the Treaty of Edinburgh–Northampton. Declaration of Arbroath signed.	
1321–22	Despenser War	Wales; England	Baronial revolt against Edward II of England led by Roger Mortimer and Humphrey de Bohun.	Initially, victory for Edward, restoring Royal power lost in the Ordinances of 1311, but the escape of Mortimer led to an invasion, Edward II's death and the ascension of Edward III.	
1332–57	Second War of Scottish Independence	Scotland	Edward Balliol backed by Edward III takes control of Scotland from 1332 to 1341, from 8 year old David II of Scotland, giving fealty to Edward III.	David is allowed back as King, Treaty of Berwick (1357) signed, England gives up suzerainty over Scotland while Scotland accepts England's overlordship.	
1381	Peasants' Revolt	England	Mounting social and economic issues precipitate a popular rising led by Wat Tyler against Richard II of England, who under duress abolishes serfdom.	Tyler is killed, the rising fades and Richard reverses all decisions made under duress re-establishing his power.	
1400–15	Glyndŵr rebellion	Wales	Owain Glyndŵr claims Prince of Wales title challenging Henry IV of England and captures some Ring of Iron castles.	Owain disappears, his son Maredudd ab Owain Glyndŵr accepts a pardon from Henry V of England; last act of Welsh independence before full annexation.	
1455–85	Wars of the Roses	England; Wales	House of York claimants; Edward IV, Edward V, Richard III and Richard of York, 3rd Duke of York vie with House of Lancaster claimants; Henry VI and Henry VII for the English throne.	Henry VII kills Richard III at the Battle of Bosworth Field ending the war, unifying both houses creating the House of Tudor dynasty.	
June 1487	House of York's Lambert Simnel pretender rebellion.	England	Lambert Simnel pretends to be one of the Princes in the Tower and/or their cousin and attempts to take the English throne.	Henry VII crushes the rebels at the Battle of Stoke Field, killing all the pretender's backers but allowing Simnel to live employing him as a spit-tuner in the royal kitchens.	
May/June 1497	Cornish rebellion of 1497	Cornwall	A 1 month popular uprising stemming from the stopping of Cornish tin mining and high taxes.	Henry VII crushes the rebels at the Battle of Deptford Bridge.	
September 1497	Second Cornish uprising of 1497	Cornwall	Pretender Perkin Warbeck masquerading as Richard of Shrewsbury, Duke of York one of the 'Princes in the Tower' from 1491 onwards lands in England in his last attempt at seizing power.	Warbeck panics and desserts his army, Henry executes the ringleaders, captures Warbeck and has him confess and then hanged.	
1543–50	War of the Rough Wooing (Anglo-Scottish Wars).	Scotland; England	Following the English Reformation, Henry VIII invades Scotland primarily to confirm the marriage alliance between his heir and Mary, Queen of Scots.	Victories on both sides; battles across Europe involving the French, Holy Roman Empire, Italians and Ottoman Empire, ultimately it peters out, all borders set to prewar conditions, Mary marries a French prince.	
1549	Prayer Book Rebellion	England	A short-lived popular revolt in strongly Catholic areas precipitated by changes evolving from the English Reformation, one being the introduction of the 1549 Book of Common Prayer.	Revolt's leaders and suspected involved parties were quickly defeated and/or killed.	
1549	Kett's Rebellion	England	A revolt led by Robert Kett in Norfolk in response to the enclosure of land by wealthy landowners.	Rebellion suppressed by the Earl of Warwick for Edward VI, Kett was hanged for reason.	
1569–70	Rising of the North	England	Revolt of Northern Catholic nobles to depose Elizabeth I and replace her with Mary, Queen of Scots.	Poorly supported the rising quickly dissolves away. Elizabeth declares martial law in the North and exacts punitive retribution. Mary is kept captive and tried and hanged 17 years later in 1587.	
1639–53	Wars of the Three Kingdoms: Bishops' Wars; Scottish Civil War; First English Civil War; Second English Civil War; Anglo-Scottish war (1650–1652)	Great Britain	A collective term for a series of conflicts fought between 1639 and 1653 in England, Scotland, and Ireland (Irish Confederate Wars & the Cromwellian conquest of Ireland), then separate entities in a personal union under Charles I of England. Ostensibly about the extent of power of the monarch and the rising power of the Parliament of England, precipitating in the creation of the New Model Army.	English Parliamentarian victory: Execution of Charles I of England and monarchy abolished.; This Interregnum (1649–1660) established the of Commonwealth of England in 1649 and The Protectorate in 1653, with Oliver Cromwell as Lord Protector (1653-1659).	
1685	Monmouth Rebellion	England		Rebellion crushed	
1689–92	Jacobite Rising of 1689	Scotland	Civil War	Government victory	
1715–19	Second Jacobite Rising	Scotland; England	Civil War	British victory	
1745–46	Third Jacobite Rising	Scotland; England	Civil War	British victory	

== See also ==
- List of wars in Ireland
- List of wars involving England
- List of battles involving the Kingdom of Scotland
- List of wars involving the United Kingdom
- List of English civil wars
- Military history of England
- Military history of Scotland
- Military history of the United Kingdom
