= Golvin =

Golvin is a surname. Notable people with the surname include:

- Jean-Claude Golvin (born 1942), French archaeologist and architect
- Lucien Golvin (1905–2002), French university professor and art specialist
- Walt Golvin (1894–1973), American baseball player
