= Al-Mahdi Ahmad bin al-Husayn =

Al-Mahdi Ahmad bin al-Husayn (1216-1258) was an imam of the Zaidi state in Yemen who ruled in the period 1248–1258. He was considered by some a sacred figure on account of his violent end in battle.

== Assumption of the imamate ==
Ahmad bin al-Husayn was a Yemeni Sayyid who belonged to the house of Rassids. His exact relationship to previous imams of Yemen is disputed, but according to one pedigree he was a descendant of al-Qasim ar-Rassi (d. 860) in the eleventh degree. He was a trained jurist who was well acquainted with the doctrines of the Zaydiyyah. His religious credentials were acceptable, since he was consistent in prayers and fasting. He was proclaimed in the mountain stronghold Thula in June 1248, becoming imam with the approval of the family of the former imam al-Mansur Abdallah. The new imam took the traditional capital of the Zaidi imams, Sa'dah, from the Sulaimanids, and extended his sway over 20 fortresses. The Zaidi positions were helped through the murder of the powerful Rasulid sultan Nur ad-Din Umar in 1250. In the same year, al-Mahdi Ahmad managed to seize San'a, where the Rasulid kinsman Asad ad-Din governed. Asad ad-Din withdrew to the nearby fortress Birash, from where he tried to disturb the imam's moves. Nevertheless, al-Mahdi Ahmad's sphere of power soon stretched as far south as Dhamar. He received a setback when he had to abandon San'a after less than a year. Instead, he bought the Birash stronghold from Asad ad-Din, whose loyalty to his kinsman the Rasulid sultan was doubtful. Al-Mahdi Ahmad entered into negotiations with al-Muzaffar Yusuf, the new sultan of the Rasulid Dynasty which ruled much of Yemen from the lowland. However, the differences between the Sunni Rasulids and the Zaidi imam were too obvious, and a falling-out ensued. Al-Muzaffar Yusuf sent assassins to kill al-Mahdi Ahmad. The imam was injured by a dagger, but his life was saved by his attendants.

== The battle of Shuwabah ==
The family of al-Mansur Abdallah soon became dissatisfied with al-Mahdi Ahmad. The imam was accused of lacking the prescribed qualifications for the imamate as laid down by Zaydiyyah tradition. Al-Mahdi Ahmad's popularity also decreased due to some cases of extortion. Dissatisfied Zaidis rallied behind Shams ad-Din Ahmad, a son of al-Mansur Abdallah, whom they proclaimed imam in 1254. With the help of the ever-vacillating Asad ad-Din, Shams ad-Din marched into Sa'dah and al-Mahdi fled. In the same year, Shams ad-Din and his brother Sarim ad-Din Da'ud visited the Rasulid sultan in Zabid and were received as royals. Another claimant to the imamate was the Sharif al-Hasan bin Wahhas. The people was enjoined to support his candidature in 1256, and certain ulemas accepted him. In 1257, a Zaidi convent declared al-Mahdi Ahmad deposed. Shams ad-Din took command over the insurgents and received support from the Rasulid sultan al-Muzaffar Yusuf. Al-Mahdi Ahmad tried to maintain his position with his remaining followers. The opposing forces eventually met in Shuwabah in 1258. The troops of al-Mahdi Ahmad were defeated and fled the field. The imam was left almost alone on the battlefield. He was surrounded by enemies and killed. His head was severed and carried to Shams ad-Din Ahmad. Miraculous occurrences were reported at his grave in Shuwaba. The battle supposedly took place on the same day as al-Musta'sim, the last caliph of Baghdad, was killed by the Mongols. The killing of the imam was followed by further internal strife among the Zaidis. Shams ad-Din Ahmad attempted to secure his claim and acknowledged the overlordship of the Rasulids. However, he was immediately challenged by Sharif al-Hasan bin Wahhas who was also proclaimed as the new imam.

== See also ==
- Imams of Yemen
- History of Yemen

Preceded by interregnum, preceded by al-Hadi Yahya	Imam of Yemen; 1248–1258	Succeeded by al-Hasan bin Wahhas
