= An-Nasir Muhammad bin Abdallah =

An-Nasir Muhammad bin Abdallah (November 3, 1196 - December 1, 1226) was an imam of part of the Zaidi state in Yemen, who ruled in 1217–1226 in rivalry with a contender.

== Appointment as imam muhtasib ==
Izz ad-Din Muhammad was born in Baraqish as the son of the imam al-Mansur Abdallah, who died in 1217 after a lengthy struggle against the encroaching Ayyubids. A sub-branch of the Ayyubid Dynasty had been established as the main political power in Yemen since 1173. After the death of al-Mansur in Kawkaban, Izz ad-Din Muhammad was proclaimed as imam under the name an-Nasir Muhammad. However, he was just an imam muhtasib, meaning that he was only qualified to protect the community, but not to lead the public prayer or pass legal sentences. Moreover, the Ayyubids renewed their military offensive after al-Mansur's demise. The troops of Sultan al-Malik al-Ma'sud marched into San'a, Zahir, Huth and Jawf in 1217–1218. In 1220 the sultan made a treaty with an-Nasir Muhammad's faction. There was furthermore dissention within the Zaidi camp. An-Nasir Muhammad was only acknowledged in the southern parts of the Zaidi territory in the Yemeni highlands. Al-Hadi Yahya, from another branch of the Rassids, kept power as imam in Sa'dah in the north.

== Defeat at the hands of the Ayyubids ==
In 1226, an-Nasir Muhammad marched against the Ayyubid-held San'a with 700 cavalry and 2,000 foot soldiers. The two emirs and brothers Badr ad-Din and Nur ad-Din, later to found the Rasulid Dynasty, collected an army to resist him, as representatives of the Ayyubid ruler al-Mas'ud Yusuf. A violent battle was fought near San'a on 23 July. Badr ad-Din took a prominent part in the fighting, that lasted until the night. The Zaidi defeat was complete. An-Nasir Muhammad, who was wounded by an arrow in the eye, rode with the survivors to Thula, as fast as his horse could carry him. After the defeat, only 40 cavalrymen and their retainers survived under the imam's banner. He died in Huth later in the year. An-Nasir Muhammad had several brothers who played an important role in Yemeni history until the late 13th century, most prominently Shams ad-Din Ahmad (d. 1258) and Sarim ad-Din Da'ud (d. 1290).

== See also ==
- Imams of Yemen
- History of Yemen

Preceded by al-Mansur Abdallah	Imam of Yemen contested by al-Hadi Yahya; 1217–1226	Succeeded by al-Hadi Yahya
