= Sanctuary of Thinissut =

Archaeological site in Tunisia

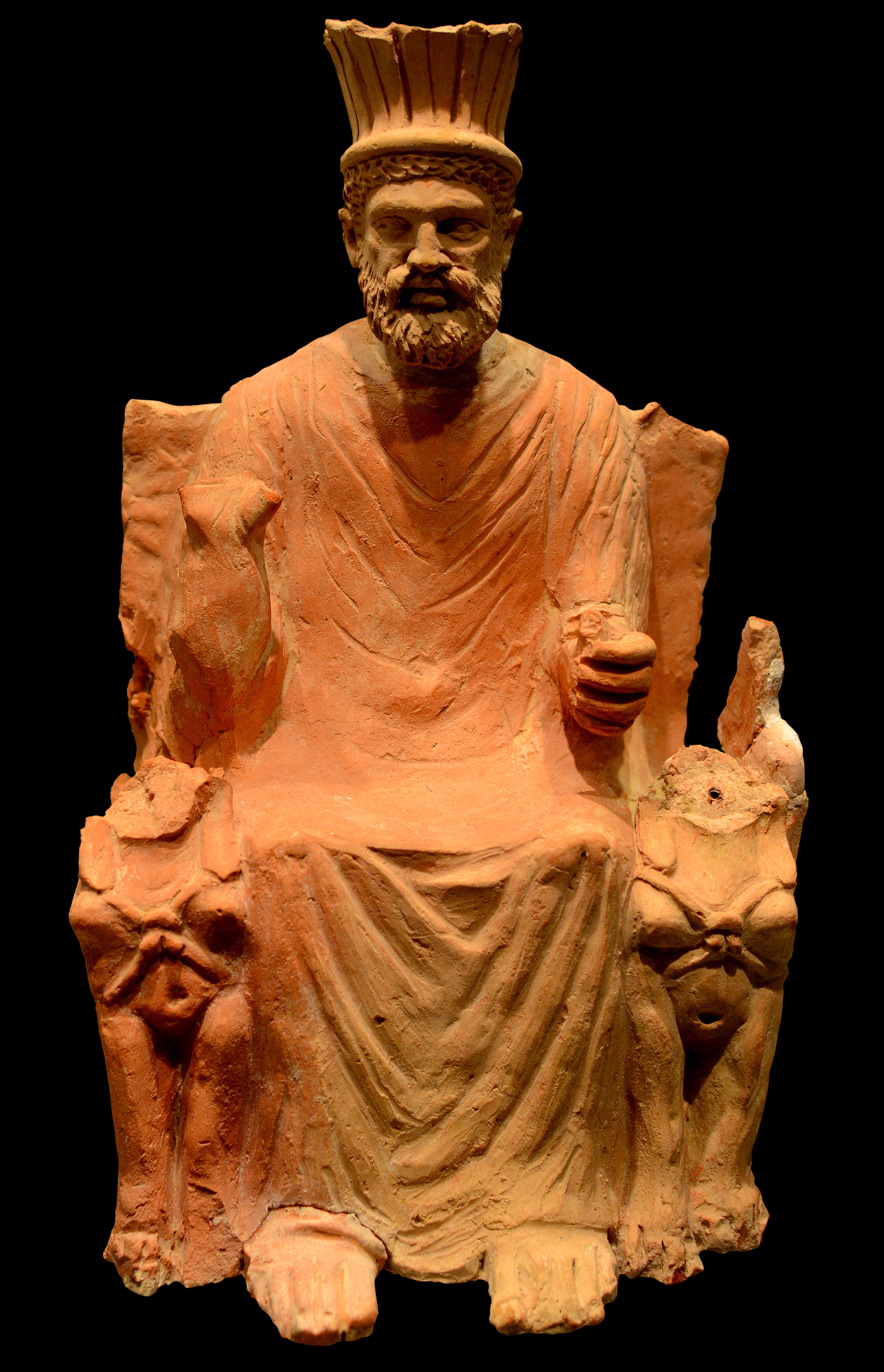
- Statuette of Baal-Hammon from the sanctuary, emblematic work found during excavations at the Thinissut sanctuary. terracotta, Bardo National Museum, 38.5 × 23.5 × 22 cm.

- Location within Tunisia
- 36°26′13″N 10°35′49″E
- Periods: 1st century – 2nd century
- Location: Tunisia

The Sanctuary of Thinissut is an archaeological site in Tunisia, first excavated in the early 20th century. It is in the present-day locality of Bir Bouregba in the Cap Bon region, about five kilometers from the town of Hammamet and sixty kilometers southeast of the capital, Tunis.

Although the excavated site is primarily dated to the early Imperial period, it is considered characteristic of Punic places of worship. The site demonstrates continuity in worship sites up to the Roman era, including the late period, and illustrates the syncretic religious movement at work. It was originally dedicated to the worship of Ba'al Hammon and his consort Tanit. However, the later honored deities include Saturn, Caelestis, Ceres, and other Hellenistic deities.

The uncovered building is a highly complex structure used for a considerable period, from the Punic era to Late antiquity. As a result, the site presents itself as an extra-urban sanctuary with a succession of courtyards and porticoes. This characteristic presents a significant challenge to the interpretation of the site, with one of the most challenging tasks being to interpret the site's history and its successive developments. The site has significantly contributed to the debate on the original characteristics of North African and Semitic worship places.

The excavations yielded a remarkable collection of terracotta statues, now housed in the Bardo National Museum and the Nabeul Museum. The pieces found in scattered fragments have mostly been restored and testify to the art of coroplathes. The collection of discovered terracottas is unparalleled in the Phoenician-Punic sphere in the 21st century.

In the early 20th century the military conducted excavations, and the site appears to have been destroyed, as noted by the Director of Antiquities of Tunisia as early as 1960. However, the details recorded during the early excavations, which were highly exceptional at the time, allow for a reexamination of the site in light of recent analyses and new research directions.

== Location ==
The site is about sixty kilometers southeast of Tunis, two kilometers northeast of Bir Bouregba, and one kilometer northeast of Siagu. (Note: Dridi & Sebaï 2008, p. 104) The archaeological site overlooks the Oued Faouara by twenty to thirty meters on its left bank, on a hillock. (Note: Dridi & Sebaï 2008, p. 103)

The site overlooks the Gulf of Hammamet, and the establishment of a sanctuary here is likely linked to the exceptional landscape. (Note: Slim & Fauqué 2001, p. 168)

== History ==
=== Ancient history ===
The site of Bir Bouregba was occupied by the Punic city of Tanesmat, also known as Tnsmt in the Phoenician language and Thinissut in Latin, (Note: Lipinski 1992, p. 451) (Note: Merlin 1911, p. 837) which was founded in the 5th century BC. The city was governed by two shophets, a well-established feature in Punic institutions, including those of Carthage. There is still a debate about the accurate location of the city, especially since there was another ancient city named Siagu less than two kilometers away. The Roman presence on the site is attested from the early 1st century, although it was a peregrine city and the details of municipal life are difficult to ascertain without a precise location. (Note: Dridi & Sebaï 2008, pp. 103–104) (Note: Dridi & Sebaï 2008, p. 116)

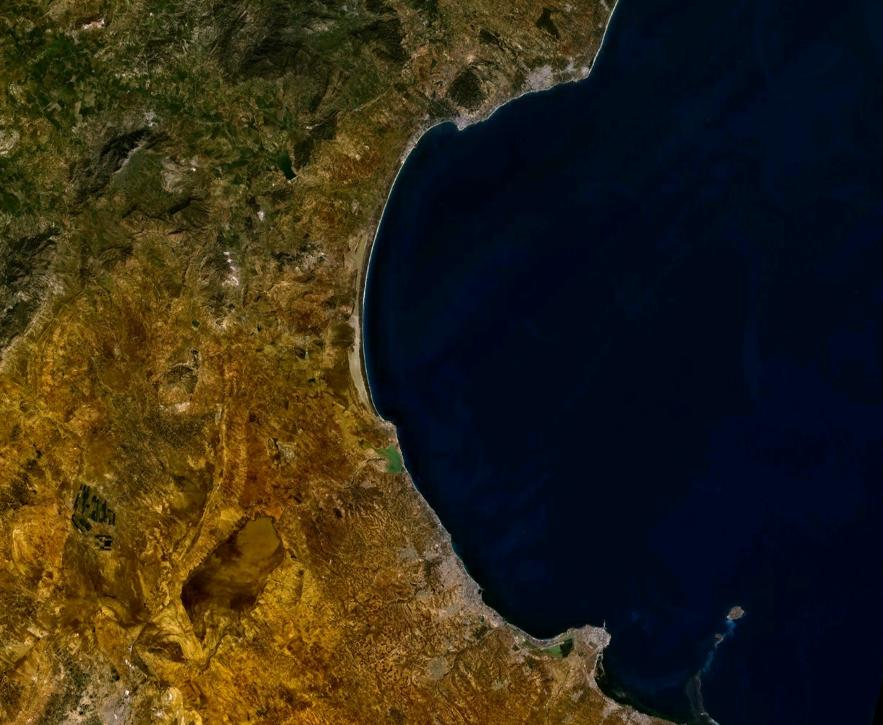
Satellite image of Hammamet Gulf.

The Sanctuary of Thinissut is an extra-urban sanctuary dedicated to Ba'al Hammon and Tanit. (Note: Lancel 1992, p. 219) The type of extra-urban sanctuary marked a boundary. (Note: Dridi 2006, p. 186) Although primarily dated to the early Roman Empire, it is considered by Serge Lancel and Edward Lipinski to be "one of the most representative examples of Punic religion."

It was used for an extended period, as evidenced by the discovery of coins from the 2nd and 4th centuries. (Note: Dridi 2006, p. 112) It underwent expansion and transformation over its long history. (Note: Slim & Fauqué 2001, p. 164) No evidence of a cult before that of Ba'al and Tanit was uncovered during the excavations.

The initial architectural design, comprising a vast courtyard with porticoes and a shrine, is believed to have been constructed before the fall of Carthage in 146 BC. (Note: Dridi & Sebaï 2008, p. 115) In the mid-2nd century BC, a renovation project, commemorated by a notable Punic inscription, resulted in the reduction of the courtyard's area and the construction of two shrines.

Sanctuary plan.

The Punic sanctuary underwent significant remodeling between the 1st century BC and the 1st century AD, with the expansion of existing structures and the integration of new deities into the local pantheon. (Note: Dridi & Sebaï 2008, p. 114) The site's elements underwent substantial remodeling, particularly the two shrines, with one intended to house statues and the other, the smaller one, becoming an altar. The addition of two rooms allowed for the isolation of the sacred heart of the Punic sanctuary, the most sacred space, which then contained the cellae of the Roman arrangement.

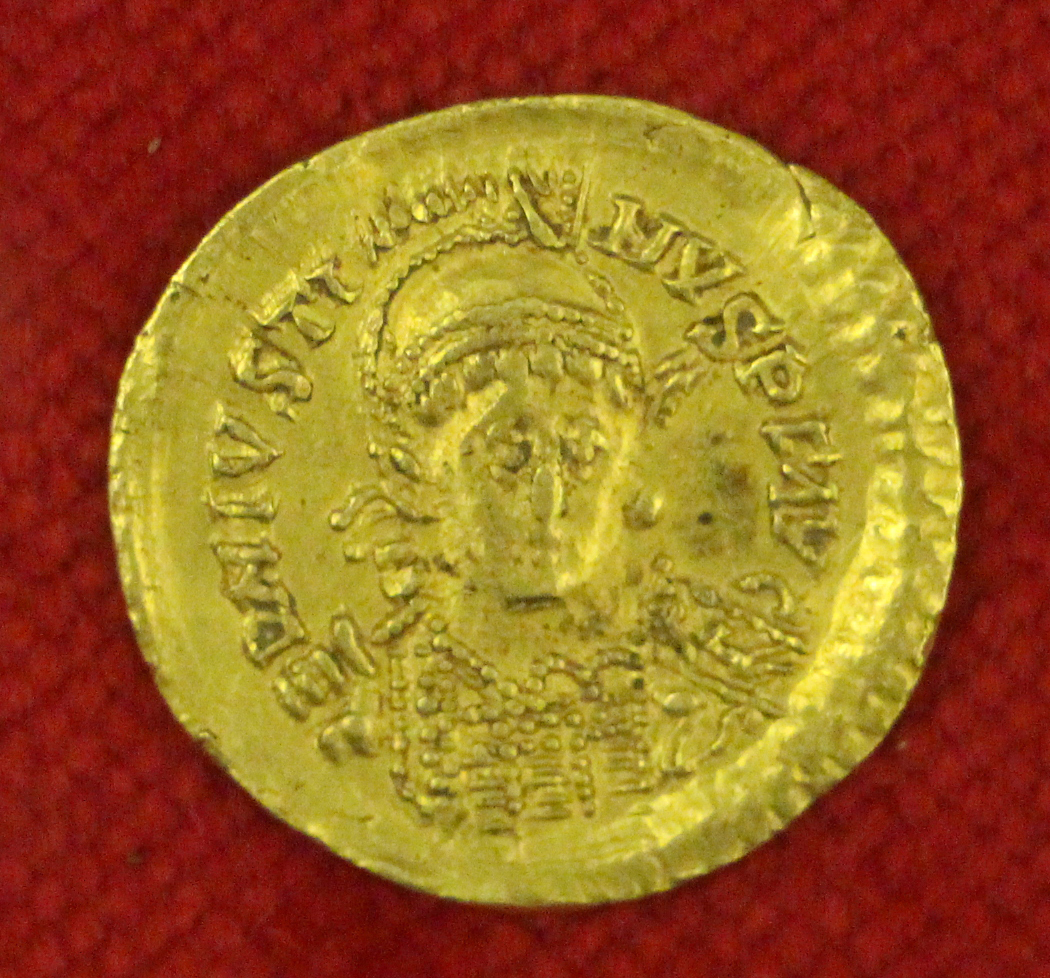
Justinian's solidus (illustration), discovered during the excavation of the site, indicates a long period of use.

Worshippers offered the sanctuary steles, altars, or statues according to their social status. The construction was offered by the entire community according to the Neo-Punic dedication found. (Note: Slim & Fauqué 2001, p. 165) The main center of cult life was the courtyard, which also contained the earliest statues. (Note: Dridi & Sebaï 2008, p. 110) The site's arrangement and the statues' placement during the Punic period, when the two shrines were built, remains uncertain. One hypothesis suggests that the site was globally arranged in one phase, while another proposes that the statues were placed progressively according to the generosity of the worshippers.

A small room was added later, and in the final phase, a cistern dedicated to Saturn was installed on the site in the 2nd century by L. Pompeius Honoratus, inscribed in the Carthaginian tribe. (Note: Dridi & Sebaï 2008, p. 113) (Note: Dridi & Sebaï 2008, p. 111)

The site continued to be used as a place of worship until the full Christian era, as evidenced by the discovery of a coin of Justinian next to the heart of the sanctuary and the presence of Christian oil lamps.

=== Rediscovery and excavations ===
In 1908, Captain Cassaigne excavated the site after the fortuitous discovery of Roman lamps and ceramics, which suggested the presence of an ancient site in a mountainous region northeast of Bir Bouregba.

The subsequent excavations uncovered a Neo-Punic inscription mentioning the institution of shophets and Libyan elements. Additionally, three Latin inscriptions were uncovered, one from the 2nd century, which pertained to the dedication of a cistern to Saturn. In his report, Captain Cassaigne meticulously recorded the locations of the discovered terracotta statues, a practice that diverged from the more summary approach commonly employed in early 20th-century excavations. (Note: Dridi & Sebaï 2008, pp. 101–102)

The items were promptly transported to the Bardo Museum, where they were later exhibited. This museum, in turn, showcased "thirteen of the most intriguing terracotta statues", as Alfred Merlin noted in his 1910 work. The Punic inscription was initially placed in the Bardo Museum but subsequently transferred to the Nabeul Museum.

No researcher has returned to the site since, with the Director of Antiquities of Tunisia stating as early as 1960 that field research was futile. Attempts to find the remains of the cult complex and the city have failed.

== Description of the sanctuary ==
=== Spaces excavated by the archaeologist ===
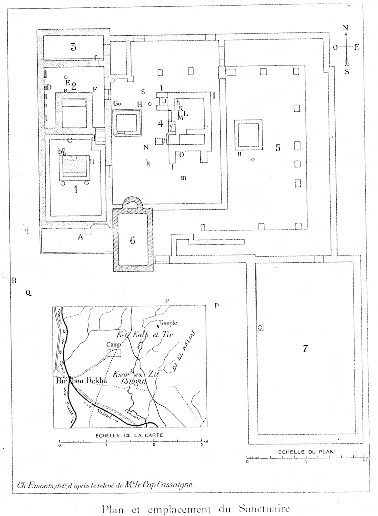
Early plan of the sanctuary, surveyed during excavations in the early 20th century.

The sanctuary's layout is derived from the field notes taken by Captain Cassaigne, who identified seven spaces in the last state of the site and used a numbering system for convenience, as cited in the most recent works and due to the lack of new excavations. (Note: Dridi & Sebaï 2008, p. 107)

The first area contained three rooms in a row. The first one had a white mosaic floor with a scale pattern and was preceded by a terrace with a leontocéphale statue on a pedestal. Other fragmented statues were uncovered, including a female statue standing on a lion with a Latin inscription. The room decor was dated to the end of the 1st century BC. (Note: Dridi & Sebaï 2008, p. 108) The second room had a pavement of brick concrete and yielded two sphinxes. Alexandre Lézine considered the first two rooms would be the "last phase of the building's construction". The third room is considered to be of a later date by Merlin and yielded materials for a closed space, including a two-spouted lamp and a suspension element, along with Punic coins. (Note: Dridi & Sebaï 2008, p. 106)

Space No. 4 on the floor plan, the "core of the sanctuary", was a large courtyard paved with brick and equipped with a portico, possibly vaulted in the Roman period. It had a compartment with sacrificial remains in its northwest corner. Two shrines of unequal preservation were noted. The first had steps, Roman oil lamps, and fragmented leontocéphale statues discovered nearby. The second, larger shrine was divided into two unequal spaces. The larger space contained the statue of Ba'al Hammon on his throne, a female statue wearing a polos, a larger sphinx, and an inscription naming a certain L. Pompeius Honoratus. According to Hédi Dridi and Meriem Sebaï, the second space of this aedicula was dedicated to statuettes and cult objects. Outside, low walls were subsequently constructed, where a nursing female statue was discovered. This statue, dated by Lorenza Bullo to the late 3rd century BC, suggests continued cult use during the Roman period, as evidenced by the presence of Roman oil lamps discovered nearby. A very fragmentary standing Athena was found on a pedestal, as well as a significant Punic inscription. (Note: Dridi & Sebaï 2008, pp. 106–107) A fragmented seated female statue was found south of this shrine. The same courtyard yielded the remains of at least two other leontocéphale female statues. Sacrifices and associated rites took place in this space, including the deposition of animal bones, the use of lamps on the altar, and the use of water from a nearby cistern.

A later cistern, as identified by Merlin, was situated to the south of this extensive courtyard (No. 6 on his floor plan). During the process of clearing the collapsed vault, he discovered Roman ceramics, Christian-themed oil lamps, and inscription fragments. The high-quality construction, as observed by Dridi and Sebaï, suggests a late build.

Similarly, Courtyard No. 5 also had porticos, although the remains of these are less impressive. A ruined shrine occupied the middle of the courtyard, the portico gallery was approximately two meters wide, and the pillars were placed three meters apart. The space was initially united with Courtyard No. 4. The entrance corridor on the southern part of the courtyard yielded votive stelae. The materials found were sparse, although a coin dated to the reign of Justinian provides some dating elements. No statues were found here. The space was used as a depository for stelae during the Roman period.

Enclosure No. 7, measuring approximately 14 meters by 8.20 meters, yielded the base of a statue placed in an outdoor setting. Additionally, the enclosure contained approximately thirty votive stelae with inscriptions in Punic, Neo-Punic, and Latin, which were dated by paleographers to a period between the 1st century BC and the 1st century AD. It is believed that this space was added to the cult complex no later than the end of the 1st century BC. Lipinski and Lancel consider this space to be a "field of sacrificial urns", a view shared by Cecilia Rossignoli, who believes it was used to bury sacrificial remains. However, Dridi and Sebaï challenge this interpretation, proposing that it was instead a favissa or a room dedicated to a cult. A statue base was discovered in this place.

Additionally, various objects, including fragments of stelae and ceramics, were found outside the stricto sensu sanctuary. A deposit of sacrificial urns was discovered in Room No. 1. These urns, aligned in a row, contained the ashes of small animals.

=== Confusion due to prolonged use ===
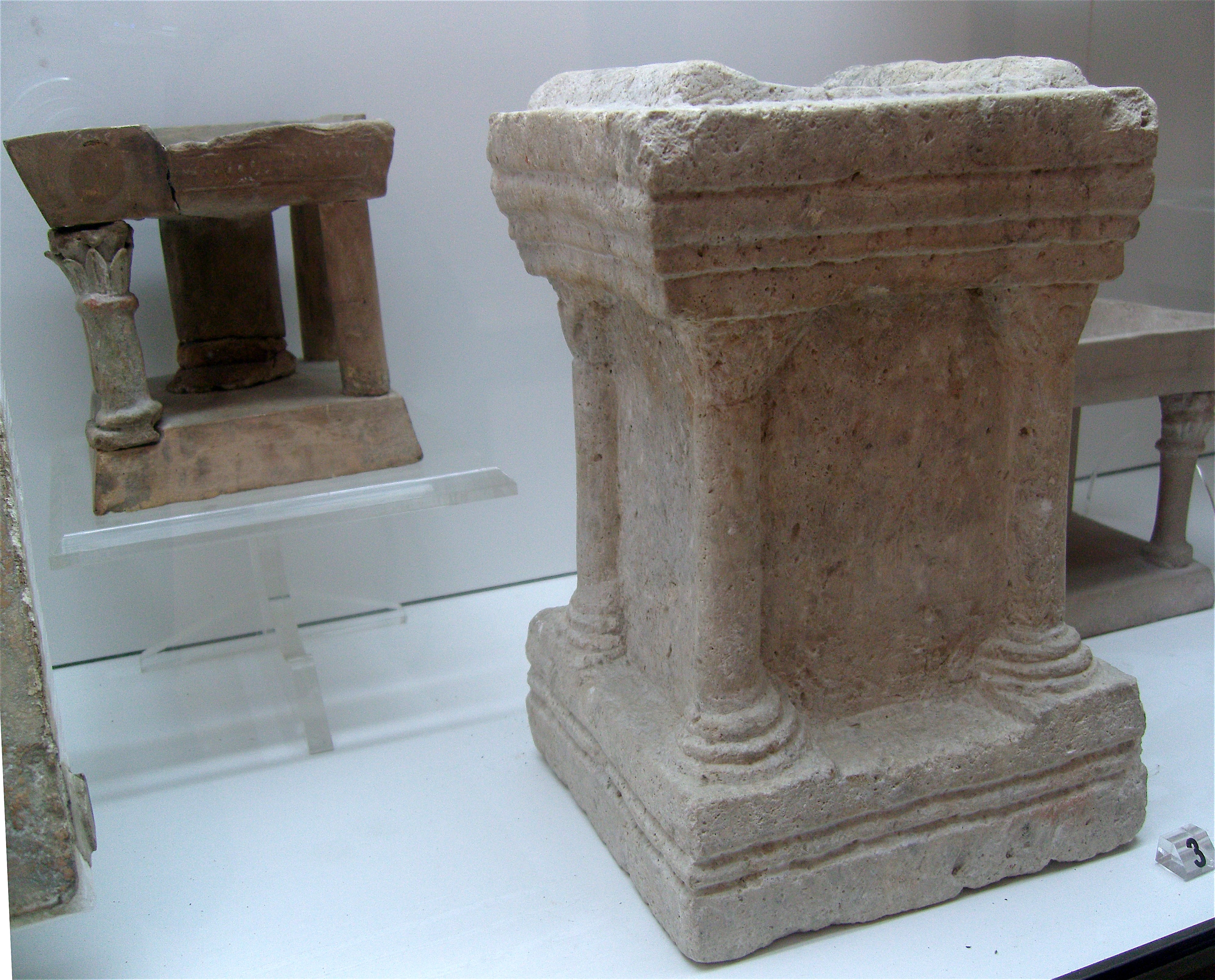
Votive altars discovered at Thinissut and preserved in the Nabeul Museum.

The sanctuary's confusing layout is the result of changes made "over several centuries."

The sanctuary consisted of a series of courtyards, with a main sanctuary at the center of the largest courtyard. To the west of the main sanctuary, three courtyards were situated in succession. The eastern section of the main sanctuary was defined by a courtyard with porticos. The southeastern section was occupied by a closed courtyard serving as an urnfield.

The Punic inscription indicates that the initial construction included two chapels dedicated to Ba'al and Tanit, equipped with necessary liturgical elements, bronze vases, and an external coating. These initial constructions were the two shrines of courtyard No. 4, with the coating recognized by the archaeologist. The shrines were later modified. The benches served to store cult objects. Merlin's proposed evolution of the sanctuary is at odds with archaeological evidence. Lézine subsequently revised this evolution, proposing that the primitive porticoed courtyard was later reduced and saw additions. In 1998, Rossignoli proposed an original sanctuary with a three-portico courtyard, with two chapels at the rear and access from the south. The inscription recalls the construction of the chapels that are after her analysis. Dridi and Sebaï adopted a similar configuration, though they offered critiques of Rossignoli's analysis regarding the later renovation of the chapels. These elements were constructed as highlighted by the preserved text. (Note: Dridi & Sebaï 2008, pp. 111–112)

According to Dridi and Sebaï, the first sanctuary comprised a porticoed courtyard uniting Nos. 4 and 5, with a shrine containing the cult statues. The inscription would recall the relocation of the statues to two better-built shrines. The original large Punic building would have been replaced by a smaller sanctuary with new chapels. The abandoned part would have served as storage, as indicated by the presence of stelae.

The internal functioning of the sanctuary in the Roman period is more challenging to comprehend, given the redeployment and complexity of cults. The dating of the construction of spaces Nos. 1 to 3 is a significant challenge. However, the presence of vault tubes used from the early 3rd century invites dating significant works to this period. Dridi and Sebaï propose the 1st century for the construction of space No. 1.

== Artistic discoveries ==
The archaeological excavations of the rural sanctuary yielded a plethora of artifacts of "extraordinary richness and variety." (Note: Slim & Fauqué 2001, pp. 164–165) Of particular note are the terracotta elements, which were "the most unexpected and remarkable finds."

=== Terracotta statues ===
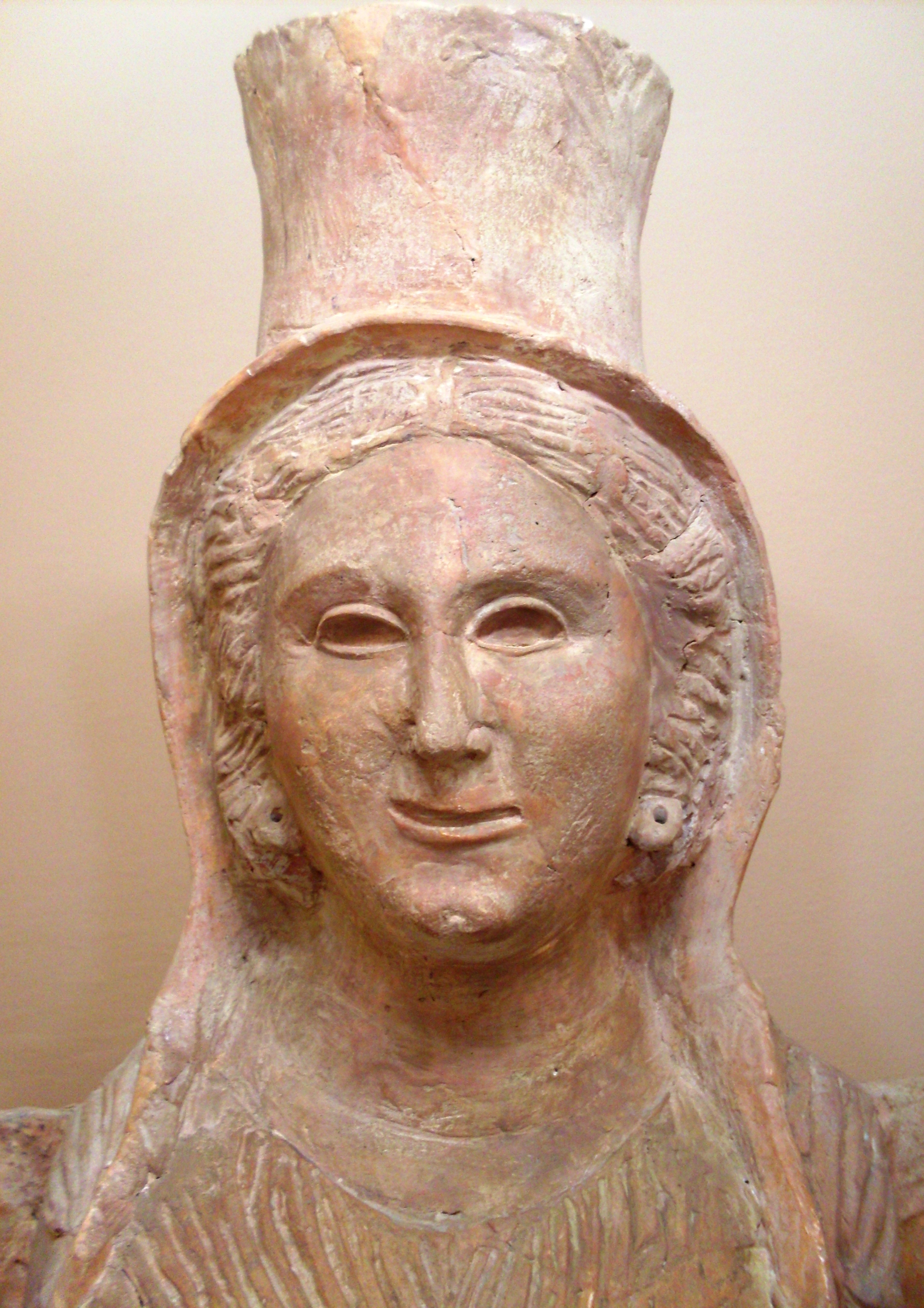
Female statue with a polo crown.

The most striking discoveries at the site are undoubtedly the terracotta statues, which are notable for their sheer number and size. Some of the statues reach a height of 1.40 meters. However, numerous fragments could not be incorporated into the restoration process, suggesting that the total number of exhibited statues must have been considerable.

In addition to these discoveries, a statue of Baal seated between two winged sphinxes was uncovered in the main chapel of the central sanctuary. The god is crowned with a tiara composed of plants and feathers, and his long tunic follows the oriental tradition. The work is dated to the 2nd century. However, it remains consistent in some aspects with Punic iconographic tradition, according to Azedine Beschaouch. In particular, it shares a representation of the same deity on a stela from the tophet of Sousse. This stela from Sousse was discovered during Pierre Cintas' excavations and is noted as probably lost by Lancel. (Note: Lancel 1992, p. 218) Although the work is dated to the latest period, it may nevertheless be considered an archetype that can be traced back to the 7th century BC in the fields of glyptics and goldsmithing. (Note: Fantar 1995, p. 283)

The excavations also revealed the presence of a statue of Ceres or Caelestis, which was crowned with a polos.

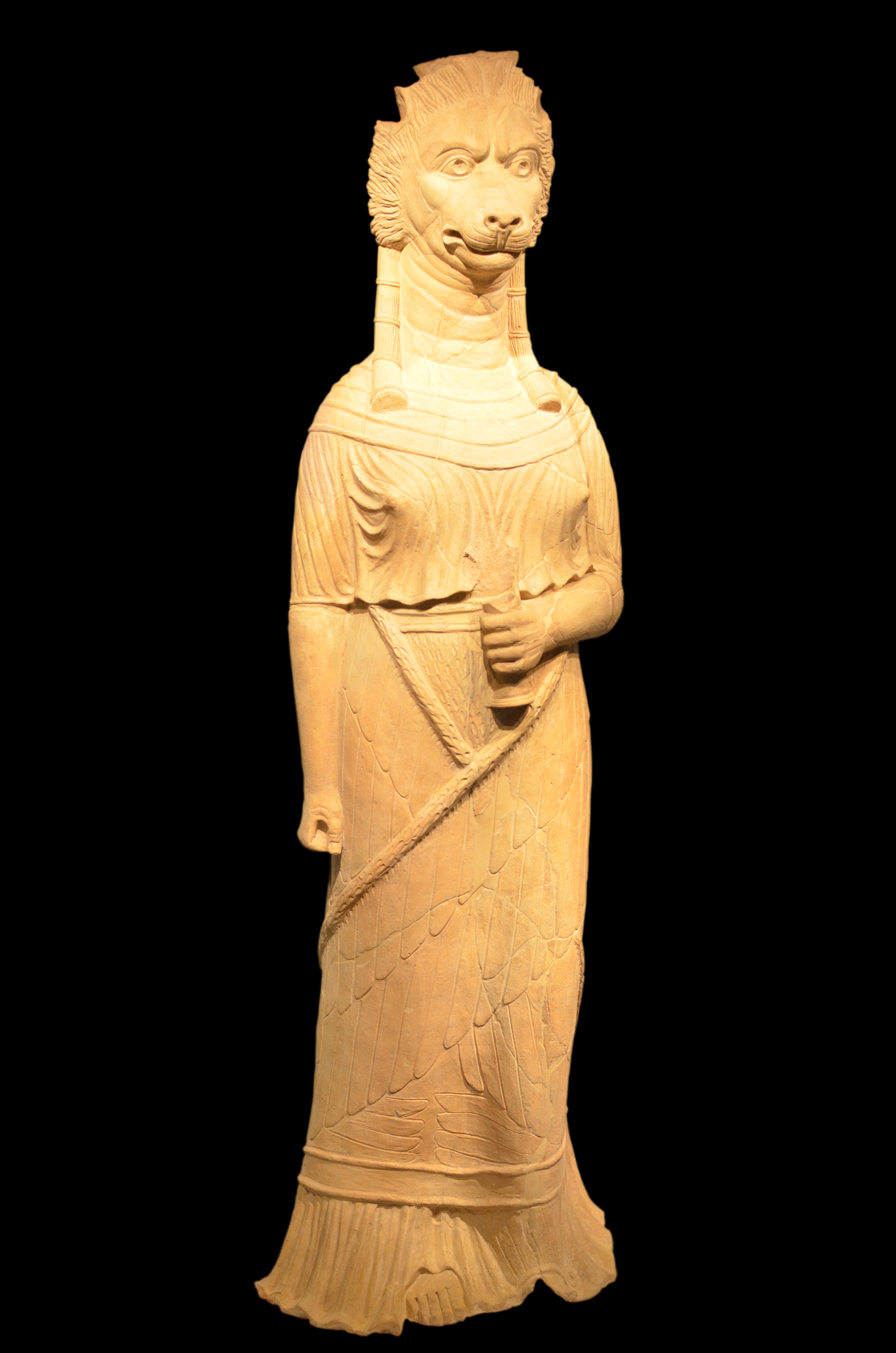
Leontocephalous goddess, 150 × 46 × 36.50 cm.

The leontocéphale statues, identified as representations of Africa, Genius Terrae Africae, are of particular significance. One room yielded at least four identical leontocéphale statues. The costume of these statues consists of birds and is inspired, according to Lancel and Lipinski, by the iconography of the Egyptian goddess Sekhmet; they are also identified with the goddess Tanit. (Note: Fantar 1995, p. 259) Hédi Slim postulates that the costume representation resembles to the female sarcophagi unearthed in the so-called Sainte-Monique necropolis at the Carthage archaeological site. The statues were positioned at the temple entrance as formidable guardians, albeit with a human appearance. At the base of their necks was a disk. In 1998, Rossignoli proposed an apotropaic function for this representation, while Dridi and Sebaï saw it as a sentinel function. For M'hamed Hassine Fantar, the goddess has a mission of "protecting the sacred enclosure of the temple and the cultic expression."

The female statues may be interpreted as representing the omnipotent Tanit. (Note: Slim & Fauqué 2001, p. 166) The forms of the goddess's representation exhibit diverse influences. The leontocéphale type reflects the African cultural substratum, the pose on a lion is an oriental influence as it is the sacred animal of the goddess Astarte, and the Greek influence is seen in the representation of a mother with her child. The statue of Demeter nursing Demophon symbolizes the "motherhood of infinite sweetness" and is dated to the 3rd century BC. According to Fantar, this representation of a kourotrophos goddess, a "mother-goddess who offers her breast to an infant," is one of the most beautiful images in this series. (Note: Fantar 1995, p. 254)

In addition, an Athena Nike with a helmet and the Medusa shield was also uncovered. The standing Athena statue with a Medusa head on the chest served a similar protective function to that of the leontocéphale goddesses.

A statue representing a goddess wearing a peplos, tunic, and headdress may be identified as Demeter. Excavations also yielded several versions of a Sphinx with prominent breasts, of varying sizes. In addition to serving as a guardian, this representation also symbolizes fertility. These statues are currently on display at the Bardo National Museum and the Nabeul Museum.

Terracotta statues discovered at Thinissut

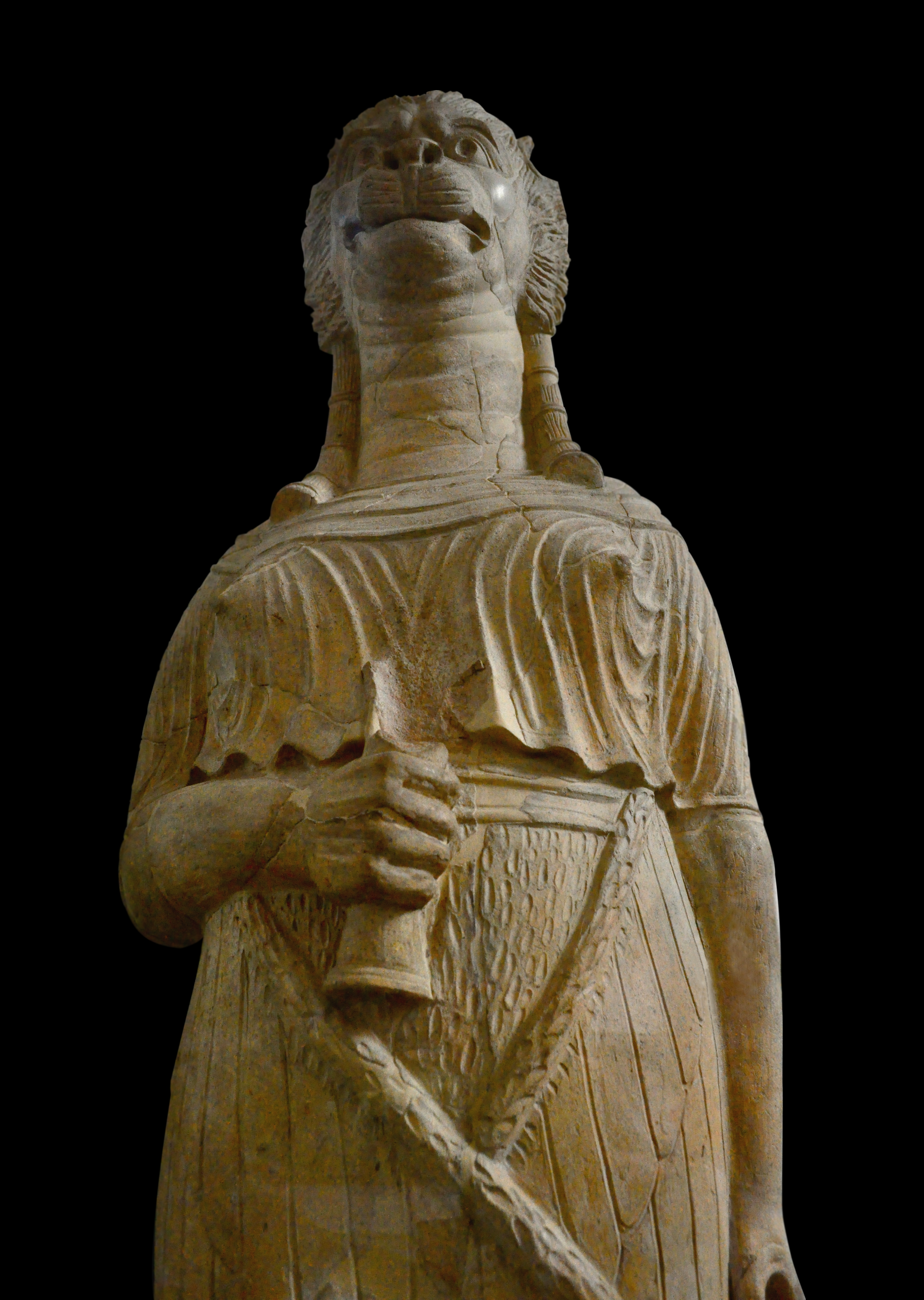
Leontocephalous goddess.

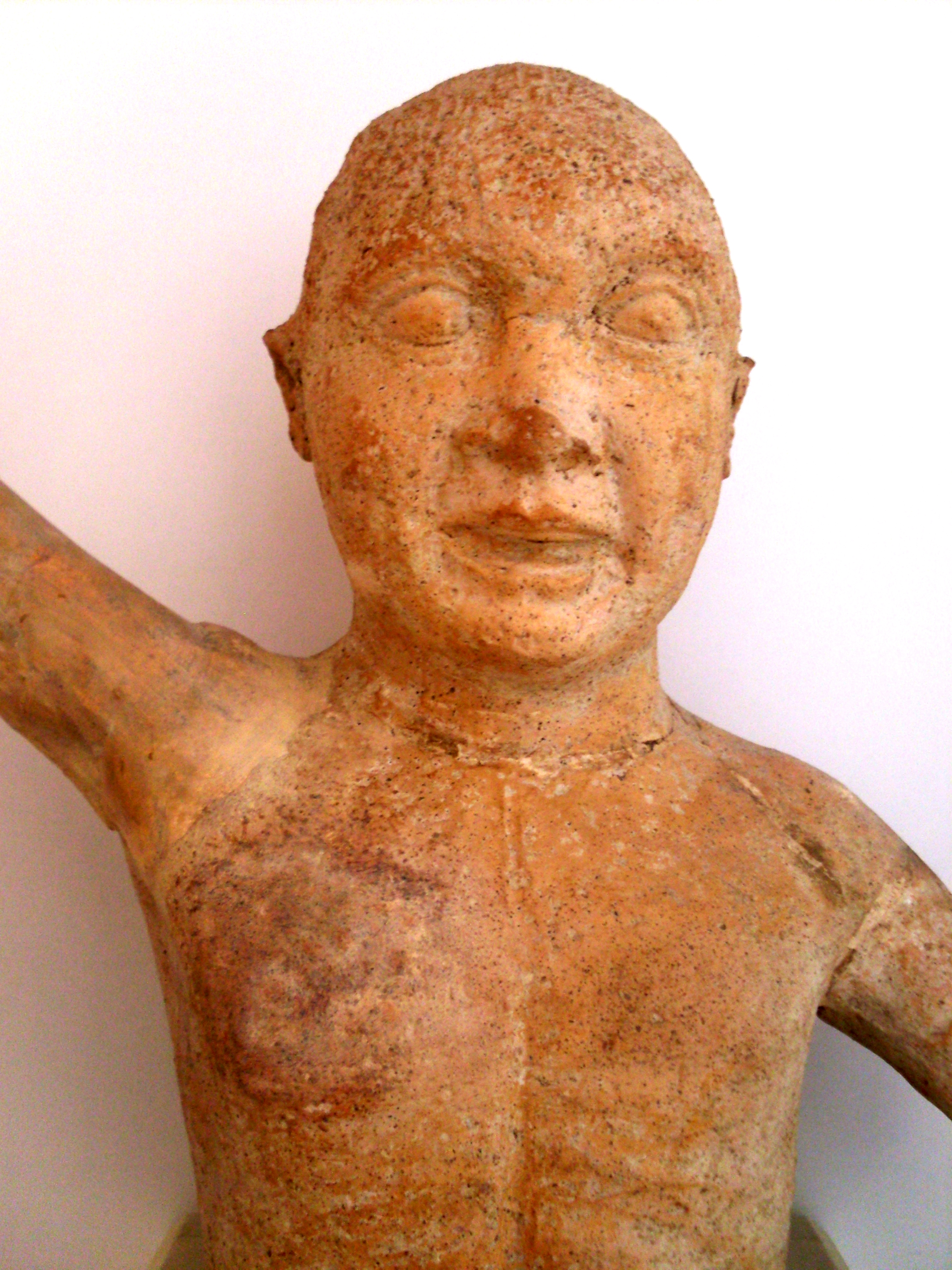
Fragmentary statue.

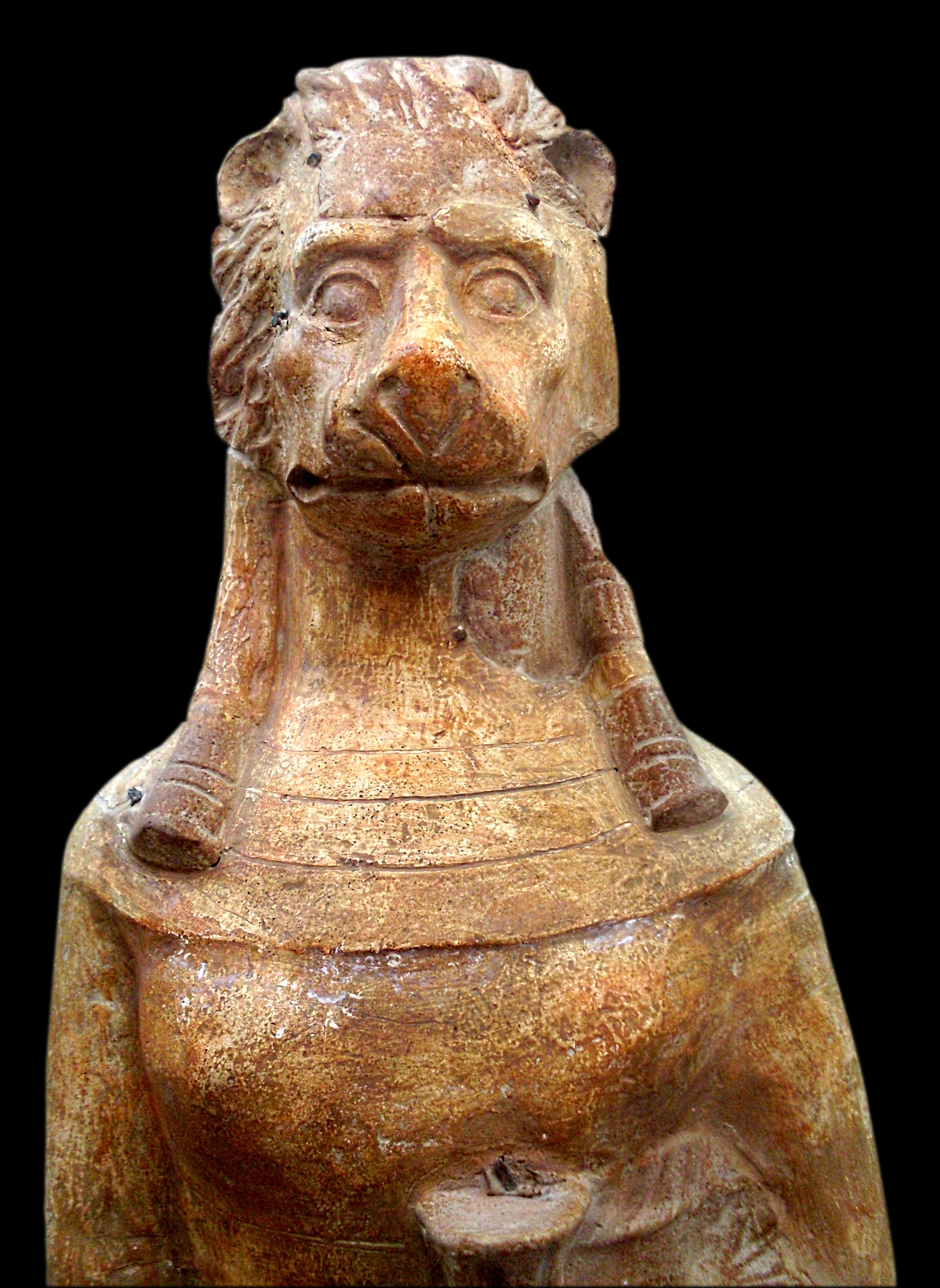
Leontocephalous goddess.

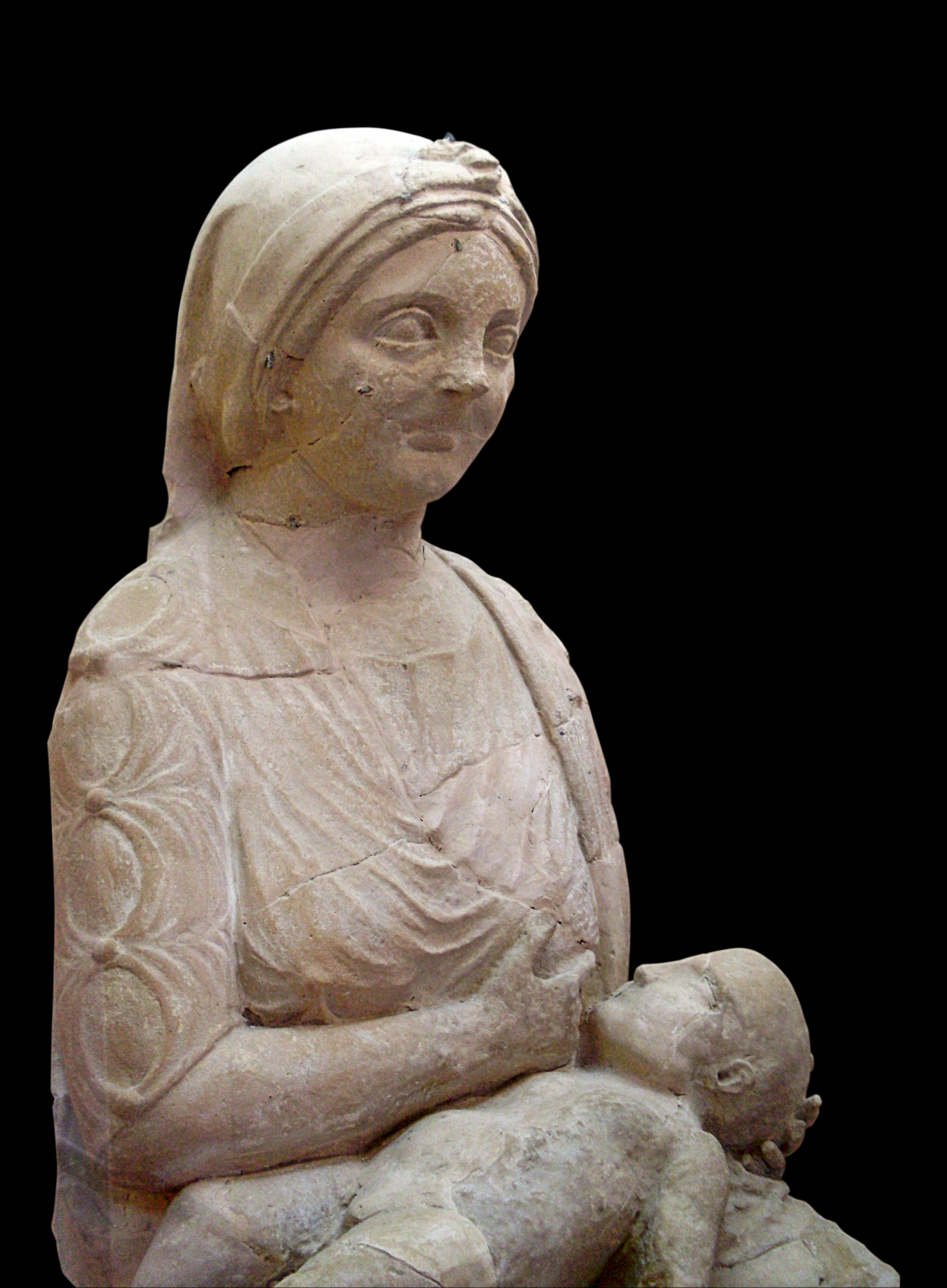
Demeter nursing Demophon, 118 × 55 × 51 cm.

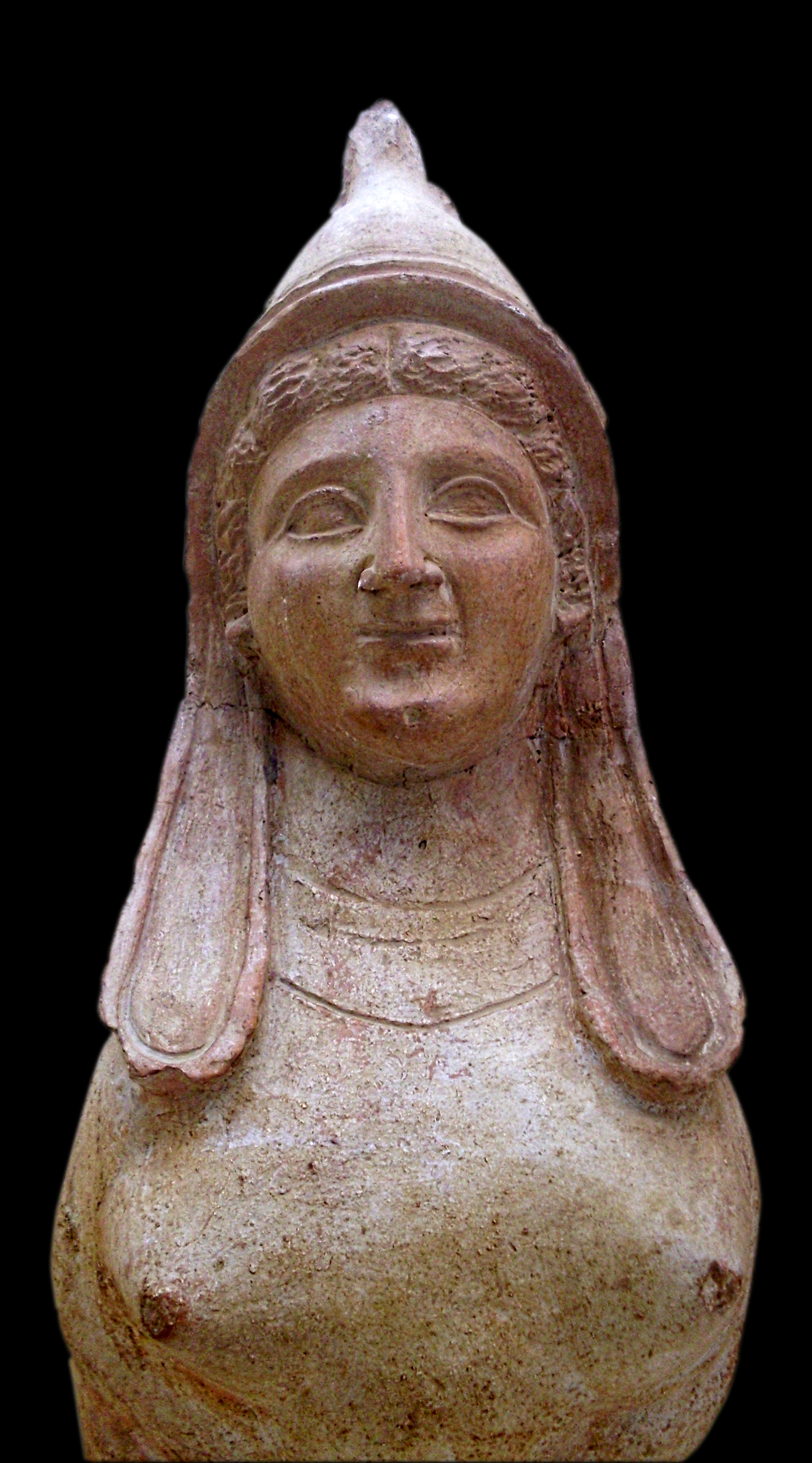
Sphinx with prominent breasts.

=== Other discoveries ===
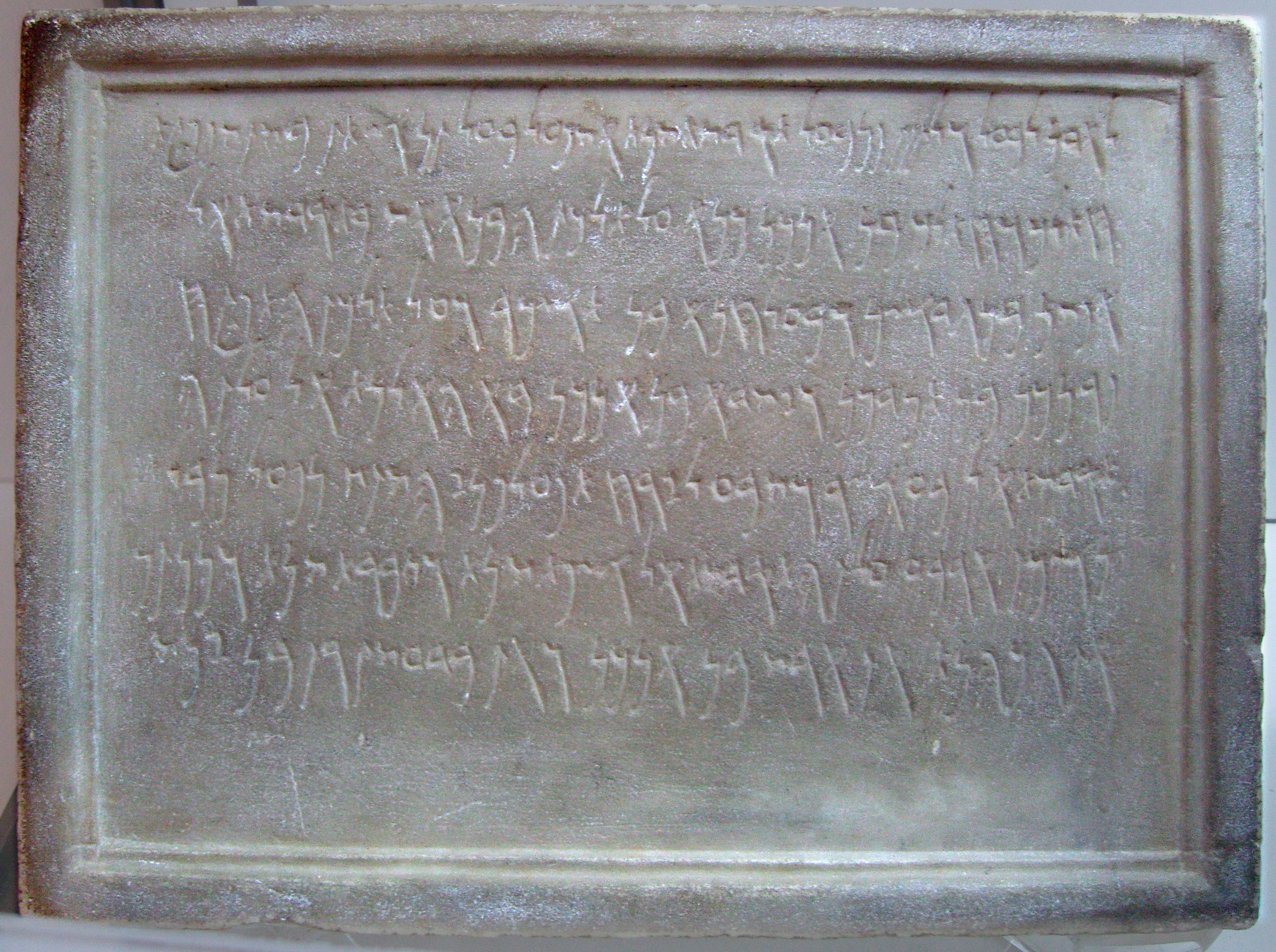
Dedication to Ba'al Hammon and Tanit from the end of the 1st century BC or the 1st century AD, Punic inscription found in 1908 and preserved in the Nabeul Museum, 0.21 m x 0.30 m.

The site has yielded significant epigraphic discoveries that present interpretive challenges.

One such discovery is a Neopunic stela carved from local gray-white marble, currently on display at the Nabeul Museum. This seven-line dedicatory inscription is of particular relevance for understanding the site, having been found intact in courtyard No. 4. (Note: Fantar 1998, p. 253)

Merlin proposes dating the inscription to the mid-2nd century BC, a dating accepted by Slim, Dridi, and Sebaï. The inscription, featuring Punic and Neopunic characters similar to those on some stelae from the Carthage tophet, mentions the erection of sanctuaries to Ba'al Hammon and Tanit, with Libyan names hinting at the presence of the Libyan substrate in society. The inscription also mentions the magistrates, as well as those responsible for the construction and decoration of the sanctuary.

Three Latin inscriptions were uncovered during the excavations. Only the dedication of the cistern, dated to the 2nd century, explicitly references the cult of Saturn, the heir of Ba'al Hammon. It reads, "To Saturn Augustus, dedication: Lucius Pompeius Honoratus of the Arnensis tribe built, at his own expense and as an act of munificence, a cistern which he also dedicated." (Note: Fantar 1995, p. 264) The inscription was offered by Italian merchants who had settled in the area to gain the favor of the deities who were locally honored. (Note: Fantar 1995, pp. 263–264)

== Interpretation ==
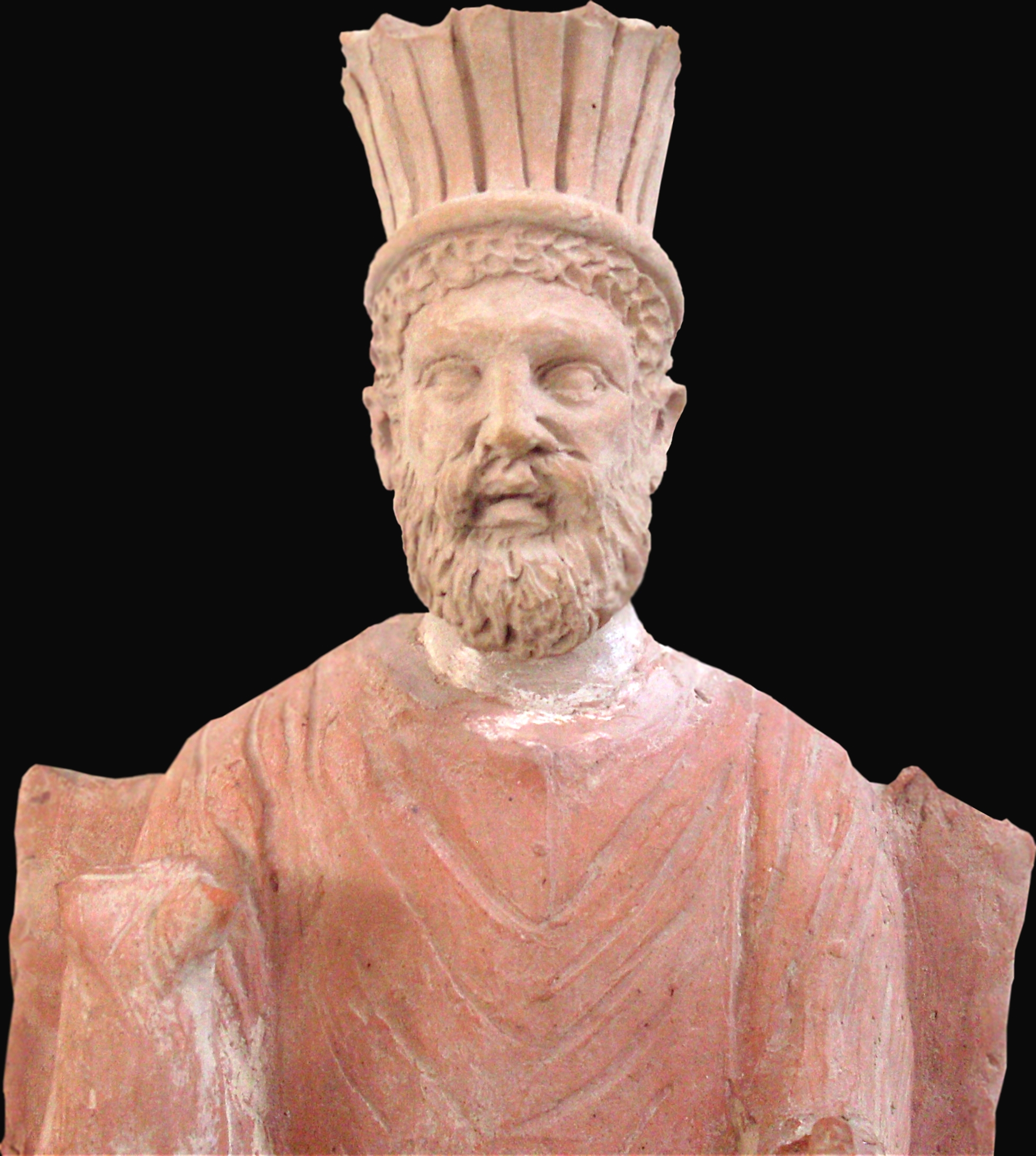
Detail of Ba'al Hammon seated on a throne, one of the iconic pieces in the Bardo National Museum.

The site is notable for its potential to facilitate the study of Punic religious continuities and to address the controversial topic of African temples of Semitic tradition. According to Slim, the Thinissut sanctuary is "a holy place between the Tophet [...] and the proper African temple."

The first topic has been the focus of researchers' attention since the early 20th century. (Note: Dridi & Sebaï 2008, p. 102) The site demonstrates the absence of a break in cult activities between the Punic and Roman periods. (Note: Dridi & Sebaï 2008, pp. 113–114) The male deity seated on a throne continued to be worshipped under the Roman Empire, and the heart of the Punic sanctuary maintained the same role during the Roman era. The "cultic and ritual activity was significant throughout the Roman period without any real break with the Punic sphere." In addition to the continuity of the sanctuary's use, there was also a "concern to protect probably ancient cult statues."

However, there were modifications to the existing structures, an expansion of the pantheon, and the relocation of cult statues within the complex. The widespread dispersion of statues indicates a desire for staging, which can be described as a true "scenography" with an east–west circulation. This is evidenced by a guardian statue at each threshold of the spaces dedicated to different deities and a "progression towards the holy of holies."

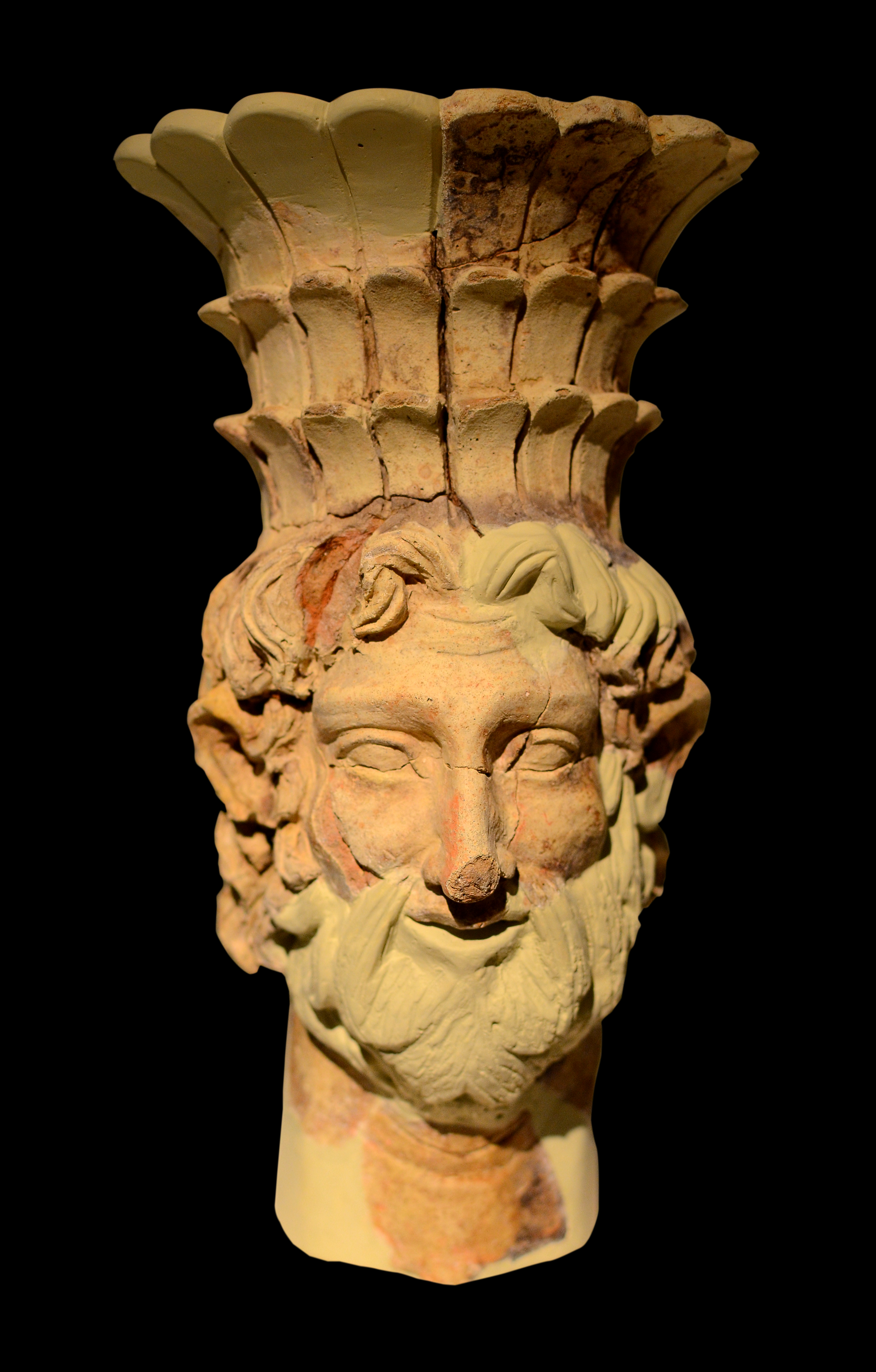
Head discovered by Dr. Louis Carton in a place of worship known as the "Carton Chapel" and preserved in the Carthage National Museum.

The technique of terracotta statues testifies to the considerable artistic talent of the coroplasts. (Note: Slim & Fauqué 2001, pp. 218–219) This exceptional technique has been considered for economic reasons, but the richness of the clay deposits in the region and the material virtues have also been highlighted.

The terracotta statues attest to the religious vitality and openness to external influences of the period, and they are a testament to the beginning of Romanization. As posited by Lancel and Lipinski, the juxtaposition of different deities in these statues suggests "the persistence of pre-Roman religious traditions in rural areas." The "composite" forms of these statues, in turn, reveal local influences as well as those from Egypt, the Orient, and Greece.

The representation of the leontocéphale goddess is the result of "a complex syncretism." While Bullo dates the work to the 3rd century BC, Dridi and Sebaï propose the second half of the 1st century BC based on their study of the sanctuary's arrangement. The female statues found on the site resemble models that were widespread in the western Mediterranean from the 4th century BC.

The representation of Ba'al Hammon aligns with the pantheon significance in Roman Africa, particularly the preeminence of Saturn and Tanit-Cælestis. Inscriptions identify Saturn, while Cælestis or Ceres is also present. The female deities are relevant, even if not identified by epigraphy. (Note: Dridi & Sebaï 2008, pp. 115–116)

Dridi and Sebaï posit that the ancient statues’ discovery is an "act of piety intended to safeguard the ancestral deities of Tanesmat." The inhabitants of Thinissut adapted their tutelary deities to the interpretatio romana and arranged the sanctuary while respecting the Punic-era sanctuary to integrate into a broader sphere, as evidenced by the adoption of Hellenistic-style cult statues.

As early as 1910, Merlin identified the "considerable value for the religious history of ancient Africa." He included the Thinissut sanctuary among the sanctuaries of oriental tradition, while Alexandre Lézine viewed it as a type of Syro-Oriental sanctuary imported before the fall of Carthage at the end of the Third Punic War. Nevertheless, Dridi and Sebaï contend that the pursuit of such a model based on an "ideological postulate" is futile.

== See also ==
- Ancient Carthage
- Kerkouane

== Bibliography ==
=== General literature ===
- Collectif (1995a). "Carthage, capitale de l'Africa". Connaissance des Arts (in French) (69): 28–47. ISSN 0293-9274.
- Beschaouch, Azedine (2001). La légende de Carthage. Découvertes Gallimard/Archéologie (in French). Vol. 172. Paris: Éditions Gallimard. ISBN 2-07-053212-7.
- Lipinski, Edward (1992). Dictionnaire de la civilisation phénicienne et punique (in French). Paris: Brépols. ISBN 2-503-50033-1.
- Slim, Hédi; Fauqué, Nicolas (2001). La Tunisie antique : de Hannibal à saint Augustin (in French). Paris: Mengès. ISBN 2-85620-421-X.
- Slim, Hédi; Mahjoubi, Ammar; Belkhodja, Khaled; Ennabli, Abdelmajid (2003). Histoire générale de la Tunisie (in French). Vol. I: L'Antiquité. Paris: Maisonneuve et Larose. ISBN 2-7068-1695-3.
- Collectif (1995). Carthage : l'histoire, sa trace et son écho (in French). Paris: Association française d'action artistique. ISBN 9973-22-026-9.

=== Literature on Punic Carthage ===
- Amadasi, Maria (2007). Carthage (in French). 978-2-13-053962-9: Presses Universitaires de France. ISBN 978-2-13-053962-9.
- Dridi, Hédi (2006). Carthage et le monde punique (in French). Paris: Les Belles Lettres. ISBN 2-251-41033-3.
- Fantar, M'hamed Hassine (1998). Carthage : approche d'une civilisation (in French). Tunis: Alif. ISBN 9973-22-019-6.
- Fantar, M'hamed Hassine (2007). Carthage : la cité punique (in French). Tunis: Cérès. ISBN 978-9973-22-019-6.
- Fantar, M'hamed Hassine (1995). "Architecture punique en Tunisie". Dossiers d'archéologie (in French) (200 « La Tunisie, carrefour du monde antique »): 6–17. ISSN 1141-7137.
- Lancel, Serge (1992). Carthage (in French). Paris: Fayard. ISBN 2-213-02838-9.
- Sznycer, Maurice (2001). "Carthage et la civilisation punique". Rome et la conquête du monde méditerranéen (in French). Vol. 2: Genèse d'un empire. Paris: Presses Universitaires de France. pp. 545–593.
- Tlatli, Salah-Eddine (1978). La Carthage punique : étude urbaine, la ville, ses fonctions, son rayonnement (in French). Paris: Adrien-Maisonneuve.

=== Related articles ===
- Merlin, Alfred (1911). "Inscription trouvée à Bir-Bou-Rekba". CRAI (in French). 55 (10): 836–839. doi:10.3406/crai.1911.72771. Archived from the original on 7 December 2023.
- Merlin, Alfred (1909). "Nouveaux aménagements au musée du Bardo, à Tunis". Journal des sçavans (in French). 7 (5): 230–231. ISSN 0021-8103. Archived from the original on 17 June 2024.
- Dridi, Hédi; Sebaï, Meriem (2008). "De Tanesmat à Thinissut : nouvelles observations sur l'aménagement d'un lieu de culte africain". Lieux de cultes : aires votives, temples, églises, mosquées : IXe colloque international sur l'histoire et l'archéologie de l'Afrique du Nord antique et médiévale, Tripoli, 19–25 février 2005. Études d'antiquités africaines (in French). Paris: French National Centre for Scientific Research. pp. 101–117.
- Merlin, Alfred (1910). Le sanctuaire de Baal et de Tanit près de Siagu (in French). Paris: Direction des antiquités et des arts. Archived from the original on 2 January 2022.
