= Dar Essid Museum =

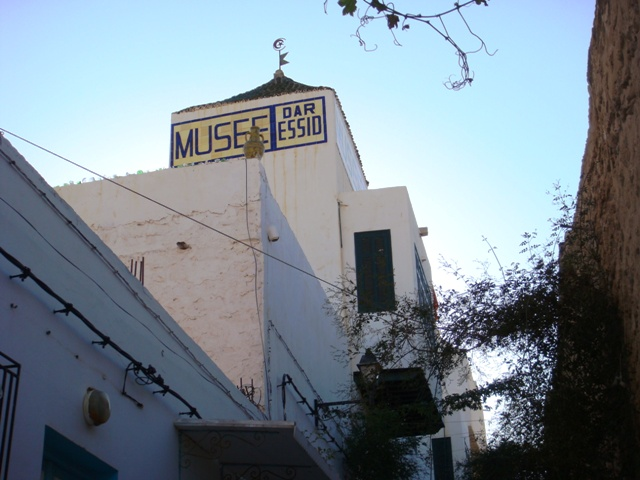
- Dar Essid Museum
- Location: Sousse, Tunisia
- Coordinates: 35.8271°N 10.633°E
- Type: art museum
- Collections: Tunisian art

The Dar Essid Museum is an art museum located in a palace in the medina of Sousse, Tunisia. The edifice belonged to a family of aristocrats.

The museum retraces the daily city life in Sousse in the 18th and 19th centuries.

== See also ==
- Dar Jellouli Museum
- Nabeul Museum
