= Lucien Golvin =

French university professor and art specialist

Lucien Camille Golvin (18 July 1905 – 6 July 2002) was a French university professor and specialist in Maghreb art.

== Biography ==
After spending his childhood at Yonne and his formative tertiary education years at Joigny, he left for Tunisia in 1929 to receive a professorship. After ten years, he received a nomination to be Regional Director of the Arts and Tradition at Sfax. His knowledge of tribal Arab culture and personable self, led to take the organization to new heights. There, he founded the Dar Jellouli Museum and during the sombre years of the Second World War, received a philosophy degree.

The next big development in his career came in Algeria when he took a position, from 1946 to 1957, as Director of Artisan Services to the General Government. There he founded 3 more museums, this time Ethnographic Museums in Oran, Algeria and Constantine. He met Georges Marçais who inspired him to follow a different route with him; to do archaeological research as a team at Kalâa of Béni Hammad on the site of the palace of the Ziri at Achir. In 1954, he submitted his grand thesis to the University of Algeria. From 1957 to 1962, he occupied the role of the Chairman of Islamic Art and Civilization in at the faculty of Social Sciences. From 1962 to 1977, he was a professor at the Université d'Aix-Marseille where he was the Chairman of the Arts and the Chairman of Arabic Archeology.

He also led several scientific missions later in his career. From Balis-Meskéné (Syria) to Thula (Yemen) and Fes (Morocco).

Golvin was the father of the architect, archeologist and watercolorist Jean-Claude Golvin and of the artist Jacques Golvin.

== Selected works/books ==
- Artisans sfaxiens. Étude technique et sociale sur l'artisanat tunisien. Notes de folklore et lexique par Lucien Golvin et A. Louis, éd. Institut des belles lettres arabes, Tunis, 1946
- Les tissages décorés d'El Djem et de Djébéniana. Étude de sociologie tunisienne, éd. Institut des belles lettres arabes, Tunis, 1949
- Les arts populaires en Algérie. Série d'études techniques et sociales, pub. Gouvernement général de l'Algérie, Alger, 6 tomes, 1949–1956
- Le Maghrib central à l'époque des Zirides. Recherche d'archéologie et d'histoire, pub. Gouvernement général de l'Algérie, éd. Arts et métiers graphiques, Paris, 1957
- Aspects de l'artisanat en Afrique du Nord, éd. Presses universitaires de France, Paris, 1957
- Essai sur l'architecture religieuse musulmane, éd. Klincksieck, Paris, 4 tomes, 1970–1979
- Palais et demeures d'Alger à la période ottomane, éd. Édisud, Aix-en-Provence, 1991
