= Al-Hadi Yahya =

Al-Hadi Yahya was a Zaydi imam of part of Yemen. He ruled from 1217 to 1239, partly in rivalry with a contender.

Najm ad-Din Yahya bin Muhsin was a seventh-generation descendant of imam al-Mukhtar al-Qasim (d. 956). The old imam al-Mansur Abdallah died in 1217 in Kawkaban after many years of inconclusive struggles against the Ayyubids, who established a sub-branch in Yemen in 1173. After the demise of al-Mansur, the loyalties of the Zaydi community were split. People in the traditional centre of the Zaydi polity, Saada, accepted Najm ad-Din Yahya as imam under the name al-Hadi Yahya. However, in the southern parts of the Zaydi land, the old imam's son Izz ad-Din Muhammad was set up as an-Nasir Muhammad. The latter died from a battle wound in 1226. Ayyubid rule in Yemen was replaced in 1229 by the Rasulid Dynasty (1229-1254). The first Rasulid Sultan, Nur ad-Din Umar I, seized several places in the highland, such as Sanaa, Taiz and Kawkaban. In 1231 he concluded peace with the Zaydi community, and there were relatively few Zaydi-Rasulid clashes until 1248. Al-Hadi Yahya died in 1239 and was buried in Saqayn. His death was followed by an interregnum of nine years until al-Mahdi Ahmad bin al-Husayn, from another branch of the Rassids, was proclaimed.

== See also ==
- Rassids
- History of Yemen

Preceded by al-Mansur Abdallah	Zaydi Imam of Yemen contested by al-Nasir Muhammad; 1217–1239	Succeeded by interregnum, followed by al-Mahdi Ahmad bin al-Husayn
