= Al-Mansur Abdallah =

Al-Mansur Abdallah (February 24, 1166 – April 21, 1217) was an imam of the Zaidi state in Yemen who held the imamate from 1187 (or 1197) to 1217.

== Background ==
Abdallah bin Hamzah was born in the village Ayshan in the territory of the Hamdan tribe. He belonged to the Hamzite Sharifs, a division of the dynasty of the Rassids. He was the next generation descendant of the imam al-Muhtasib al-Mujahid Hamzah who died in battle in 1066. In his youth, he took up quranic studies and was an outstanding student who acquired a good juridical knowledge. As an adult, he was described as a large and well-shaped man with a heavy beard. The Zaidi community of the northern highland had not been able to appoint a new imam after the demise of al-Mutawakkil Ahmad bin Sulayman in 1171. Abdallah made a proclamation in Jawf in 1187. Although acknowledged by several men of standing, his attempt to gain power over the Zaidi community was a failure, and he withdrew to Jawf.

== Renewed call for the imamate ==
By this time, the main external threat against the Zaidis was the Sunni Muslim Ayyubid Dynasty, which had invaded Yemen from its base in Egypt in 1173. The new regime quickly occupied much of the country. The important highland city San'a was, for most of the time, in the hands of the Hatimid Sultan Ali bin Hatim, whose attitude to the Ayyubids alternated between submission and resistance. When the Ayyubid ruler Tughtakin, a brother of Saladin, died in 1197, virtually all Yemen except Sa'dah, the traditional centre of the Zaydiyyah, was in Ayyubid hands. In September or October 1197, the month after Tughtakin's death, Abdallah made his second bid for the imamate, and this time he was successful. As imam, he carried the honorific (laqab) title al-Mansur Abdallah. He established his residence in Sa'dah. Al-Mansur was a man of learning, and 81 works by his hand are listed in one source. Among his writings are a treatise on the mutual conduct of children and parents, answers to questions about the first four caliphs, a diwan, a rajaz poem on the care and training of horses, and a four-volume work dealing with doctrinary questions, Ash-Shafi. He sent his da'i (messengers) to Gilan and Deylaman in Persia, so that the khutba was read in his name among the Zaidis there. He also enjoyed some influence in the Hijaz. Al-Mansur Abdallah took a strict stance on religious matters, expelling unchaste women and pouring fermented drinks on the ground. The Mutarrifiyyah sect, which was considered heretic, was mercilessly crushed and its mosque near San'a was torn down on the orders of al-Mansur.

== Struggles over San'a ==
In 1197, Sultan Ali allied with al-Mansur Abdullah and fought against Mu'izz ad-Din Isma'il, the Ayyubid sultan in Yemen. The allies were heavily defeated at Hadur. However, a Kurdish emir, Haku bin Muhammad, and the Mamluk Shams al-Khawass, subsequently fell away from the Ayyubids and joined the Zaidi camp. The imam and Shams al-Khawass seized San'a, which momentarily stood under an Ayyubid governor. Nevertheless, the two allies immediately fell out with each other, since Shams al-Khawass was suspicious of the imam's influence among the masses. The imam had to sneak out of San'a with great effort, but managed to reach his troops outside the city walls and took possession of the city. In 1198, a new Ayyubid army marched towards San'a but was defeated by the Zaidi forces at Dhamar. Shortly afterwards, however, San'a was captured by still another Ayyubid contingent, and al-Mansur Abdullah withdrew to the mountainous stronghold Thula.

== Continuing struggles against the Ayyubids ==
In the following years, the inconclusive Zaidi struggle against the Ayyubids wore on. San'a was in the hands of the imam for several short terms. In 1203, the imam strengthened the fortress of Zafar, and in 1205 he made peace with the Ayyubid governor in San'a, Wurdashar. Nevertheless, the peace only lasted for about two years. Serious fighting broke out in 1215, and this time a number of Zaidi strongholds in the north were captured. Al-Mansur Abdallah withdrew to Kawkaban where he took up a strong position. A large residence was constructed there, with quarters for his followers. A mint was also established. A new Zaidi-Ayyubid peace was concluded in 1216, but fighting was resumed within short. The following battles turned inconclusive, and the warfare was terminated when the imam died in Kawkaban in 1217. After his demise, the Zaidi community was split between two rival imams. These were his son an-Nasir Muhammad, and al-Hadi Yahya who belonged to another Rassid branch. Al-Mansur's nephews settled in the northern highland, adjacent to Asir, where they pursued their own secular policy, allying with the Zaidi imams, the Sulaymanid Sharifs, and the Rassids according to opportunities.

== See also ==
- Rassids
- Imams of Yemen
- History of Yemen

Vacant Interregnum Title last held by al-Mutawakkil Ahmad bin Sulayman	Zaydi Imam of Yemen; 1197–1217	Succeeded by al-Hadi Yahya and an-Nasir Muhammad bin Abdallah
