= Al-Hasan bin Wahhas =

Al-Hasan bin Wahhas (d. February, 1285) was an imam of the Zaidi state in Yemen who ruled in 1258–1260.

The previous imam al-Mahdi Ahmad bin al-Husayn made a number of enemies among the Zaidi elite during his lifetime, which eventually resulted in his violent death in the Battle of Shuwaba in 1258. One of the claimants for the imamate was Abu Muhammad al-Hasan bin Wahhas, who belonged to the Hamzite Sharifs, descendants of imam al-Muhtasib al-Mujahid Hamzah (d. 1066). He was acknowledged as imam by part of the Zaidis. Personally, he was described as dashing in warfare and an excellent horseman. Another claimant was Shams ad-Din Ahmad who formally submitted to the suzerainty of the Rasulid sultan, the main power in Yemen at this time. The two would-be imams shared the properties and fortresses of the Zaidi lands between them. In the same year, Shams ad-Din and two of his brothers succumbed to an epidemic, leaving al-Hasan bin Wahhas as the holder of the imamate. However, he soon fell out with Shams ad-Din's brother Sarim ad-Din Da'ud (d. 1290). Sarim ad-Din colluded with the Rasulid prince Asad ad-Din Muhammad and met al-Hasan bin Wahhas in battle at Asafir in 1260. While the imam's forces fled, al-Hasan remained fighting on the battlefield until taken prisoner. Sarim ad-Din kept the imam imprisoned until 1269. Much later, in 1284, Sarim ad-Din tried unsuccessfully to enlist the support of al-Hasan to fight the Rasulids. The ex-imam died shortly afterwards, in February 1285.

== See also ==
- Imams of Yemen
- History of Yemen

Preceded by al-Mahdi Ahmad bin al-Husayn	Zaydi Imam of Yemen; 1258–1260	Succeeded by Yahya bin Muhammad as-Siraji
