= Douz Museum =

Coordinates: 33.4500°N 9.0100°E

The Douz Sahara Museum
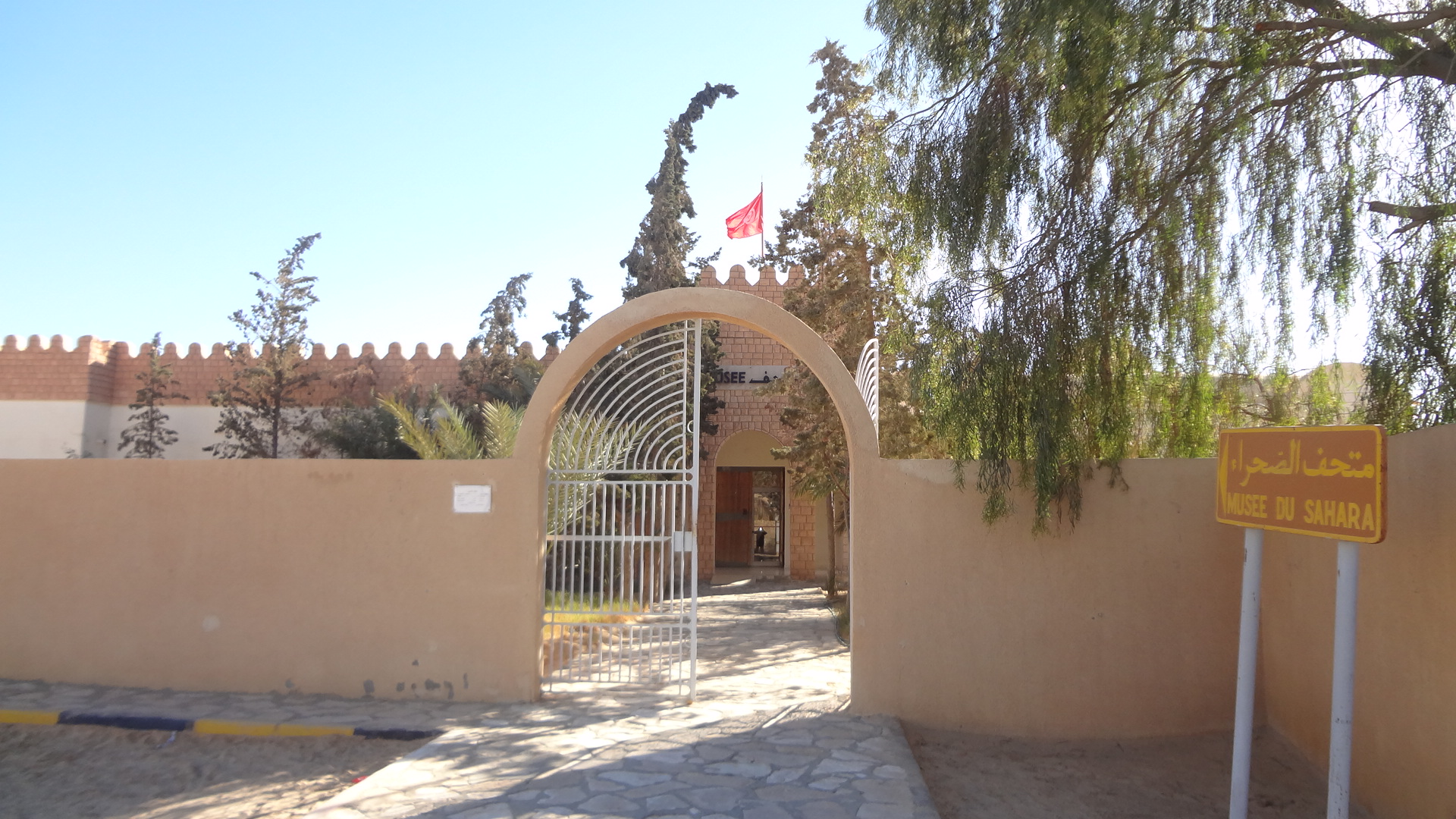
- The entrance to the Douz Museum
- Established: 1997
- Location: Douz, Tunisia
- Type: archaeological museum
- Collections: Bubalus Period objects

The Douz Sahara Museum is an archaeological museum located in Douz, Tunisia. It was established in 1997. The museum is centered on the culture of the Tunisian Sahara.

== See also ==
- Dar Jellouli Museum
- Nabeul Museum
