= Nabeul Museum =

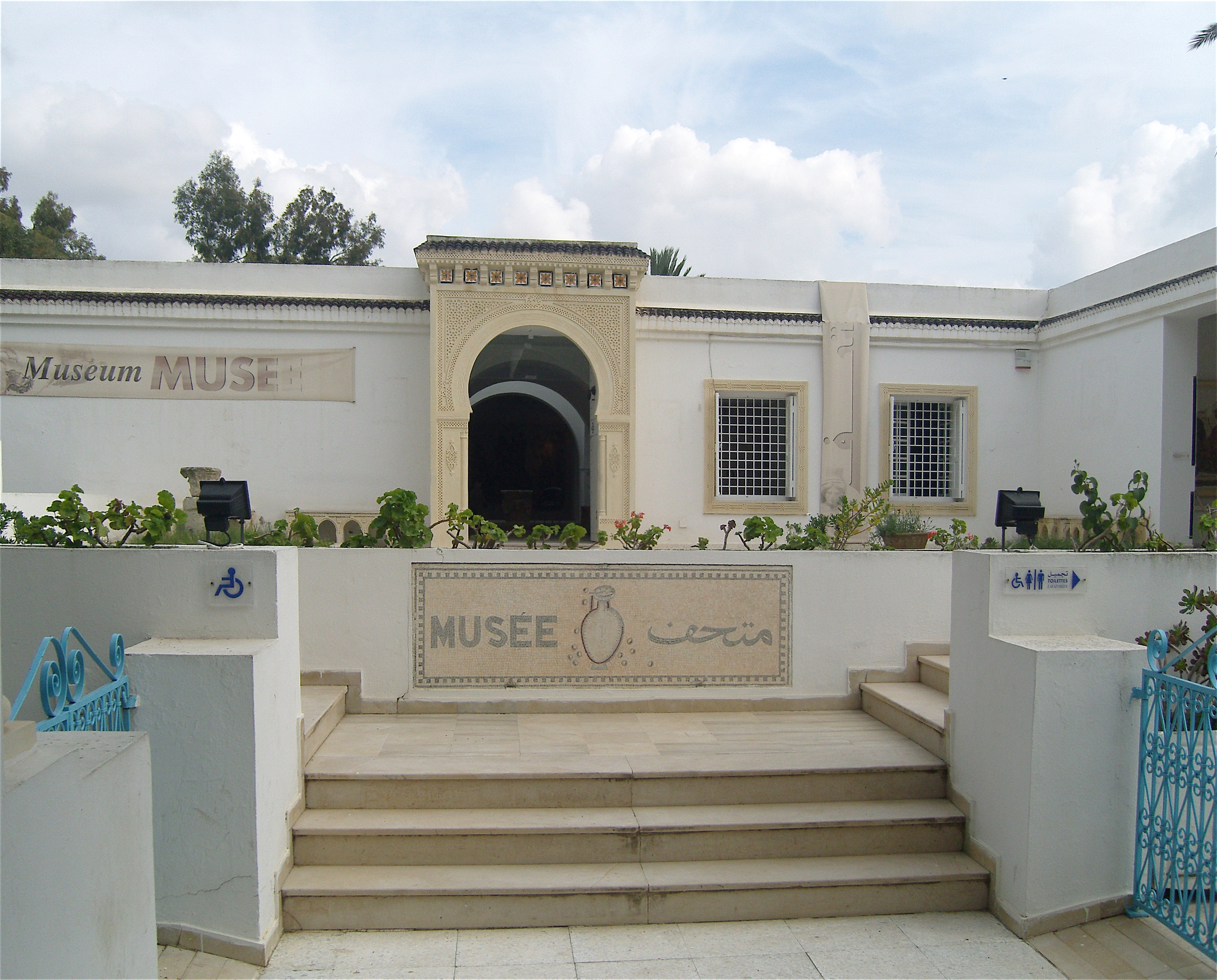
- Entrance to the Nabeul Museum
- Established: 1984
- Location: Nabeul, Tunisia
- Coordinates: 36.4507°N 10.7364°E
- Type: archaeological museum
- Collections: Berber objects, Roman artifacts, ancient Egyptian items, Punic art

Nabeul Museum (Arabic: متحف نابل) is an archaeological museum located in Nabeul, Tunisia. It was established in 1984.

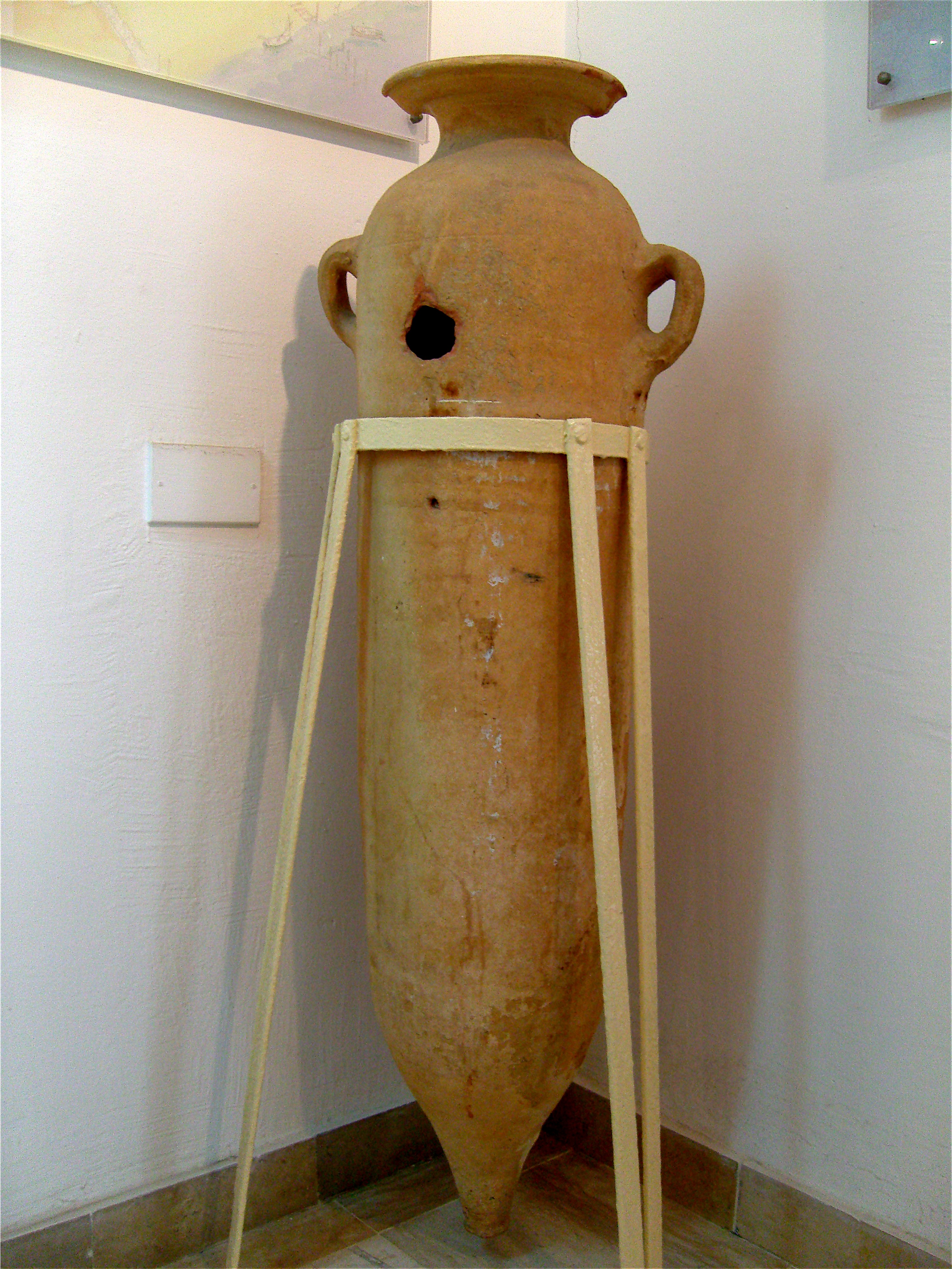
Terracotta amphora at the Nabeul Museum.

The museum was established to collect some of the objects found during excavations that took place at various sites of Cape Bon.

It features objects from ancient Nabeul (Neapolis), as well as items from other archaeological sites of Cape Bon. The Nabeul Museum contains pieces dating from before the Roman period, ceramics and amulets in the ancient Egyptian style of Kerkuane, and terracotta statues from the Punic sanctuary of Thinissut. Roman collections are illustrated by numerous mosaics found at Neapolis. In recent years, the content of the museum is enriched by the acquisition of three mosaics of Kelibia as well as the opening of a hall dedicated to the search of a factory of salting of fish.

== See also ==
- Carthage Paleo-Christian Museum
- Dar Essid Museum
- Dar Jellouli Museum
- Douz Museum
