= Dar Jellouli Museum =

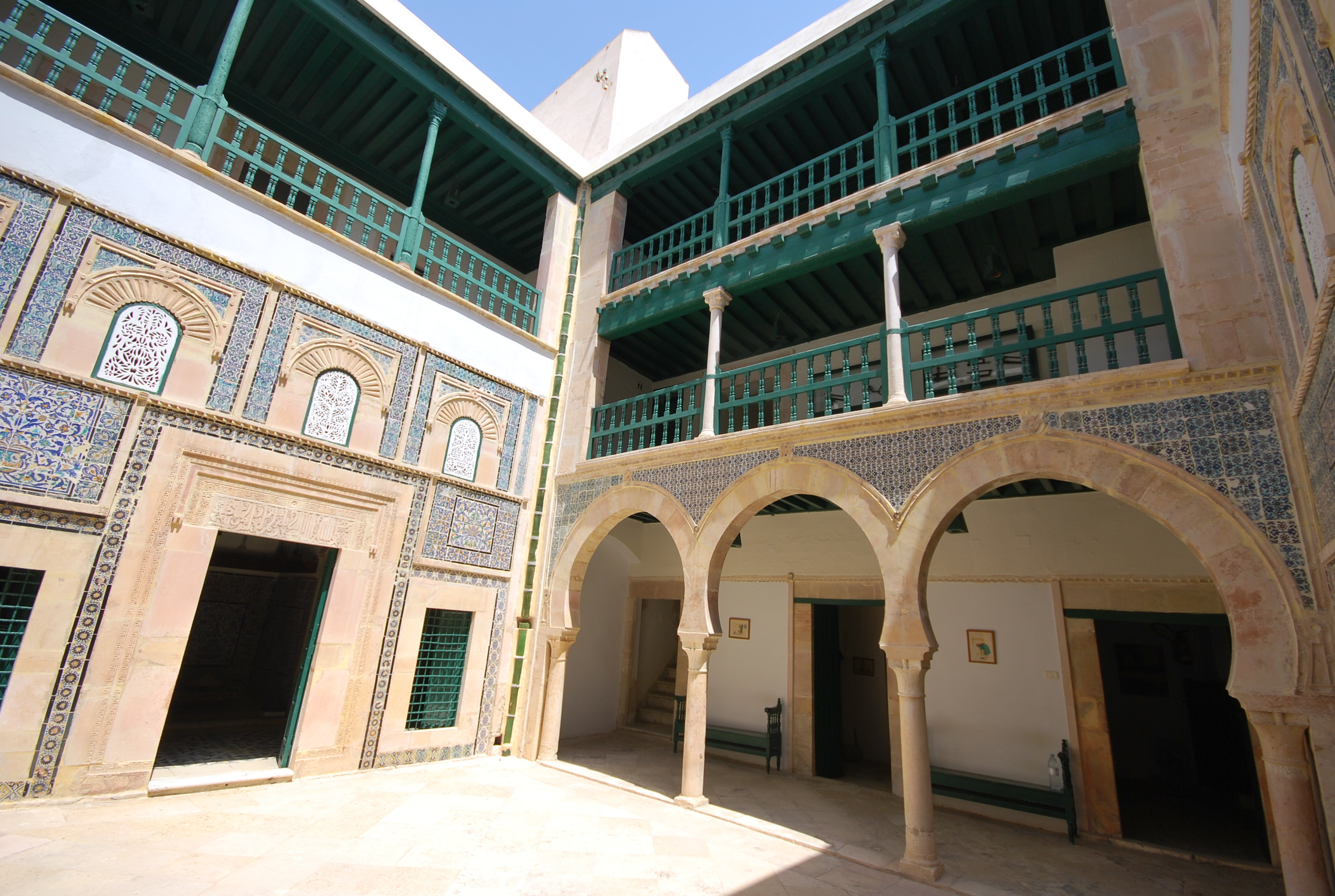
- Courtyard of Dar Jellouli museum
- Established: 1939
- Location: Dar Jallouli, Tunisia
- Coordinates: 34.7370°N 10.7621°E
- Type: art museum

Dar Jellouli Museum (Arabic: متحف دار الجلولي), also known as the Regional Museum of Arts and Folk Traditions, is an art museum located in Tunisia. It was founded in 1939 by the French scholar on Maghrebi art Lucien Golvin, in a palace located in the heart of the ancient city of Sfax.

== History ==
The house was built by Andalusian Muslim refugees fleeing from the Spanish persecutions in the 17th century. Since then the house was bought by Farhat al-Jalouli, a military commander from Sfax and a wealthy gun dealer. The son of his grandson, Mahmoud al-Jalouli, was a wealthy businessman as well and he moved to Medina of Tunis, but five of his sons (Farhat, Hassan, Mohammed, Sadiq and al-Arabi) lived at the house in Sfax as military commanders from the area. The house became their headquarters.

The house became a medical clinic in 1934. In 1939, it became an artistic center under the direction of the French university professor Lucien Golvin. To this day the house has been serving as a regional museum of arts and folk traditions.

== Architecture ==
The facade of the house is modest and its design is purely classical, and it contains many characteristics of Tunisian housing. Around the square courtyard in the center, there are rooms of inverted T shape. The courtyard is located opposite from the entrance door, with its two compartments serving as storage area of supplies.

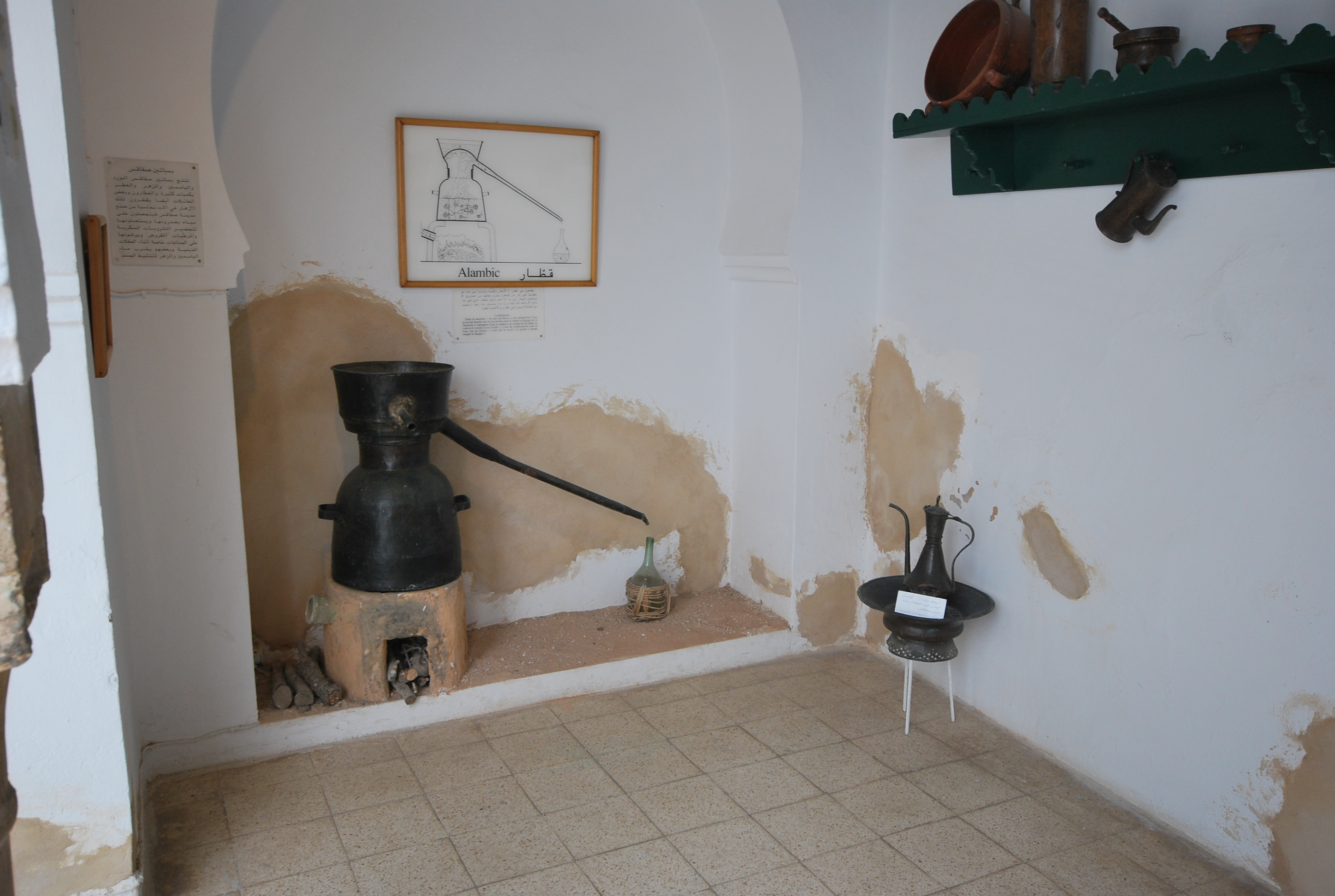

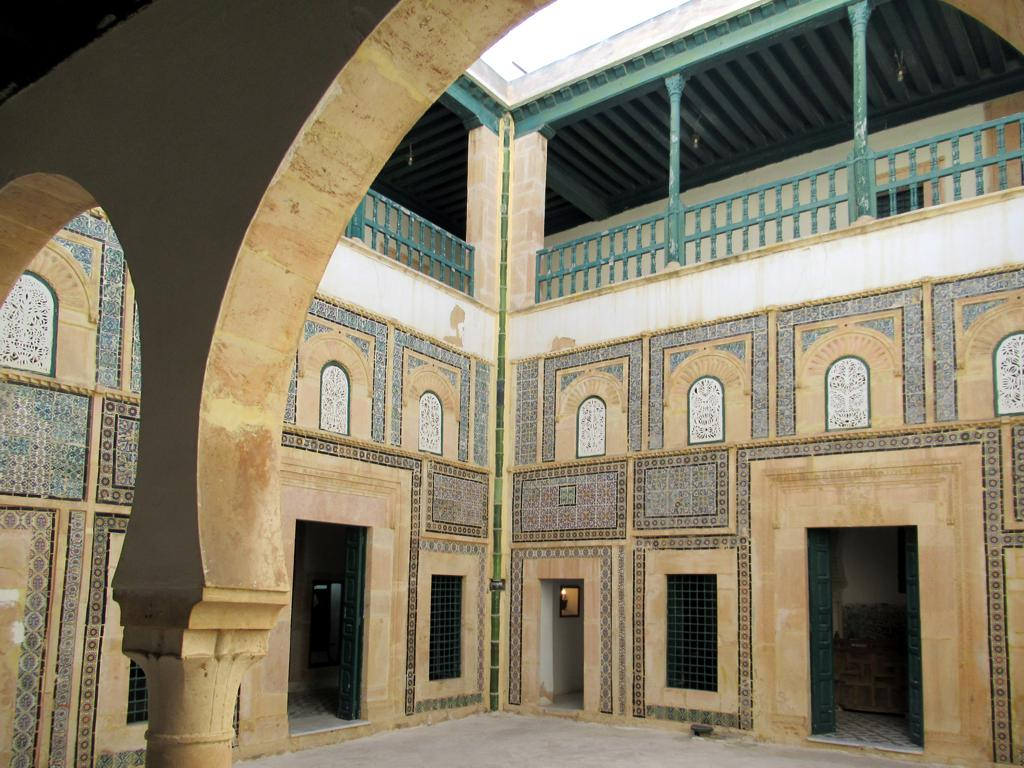

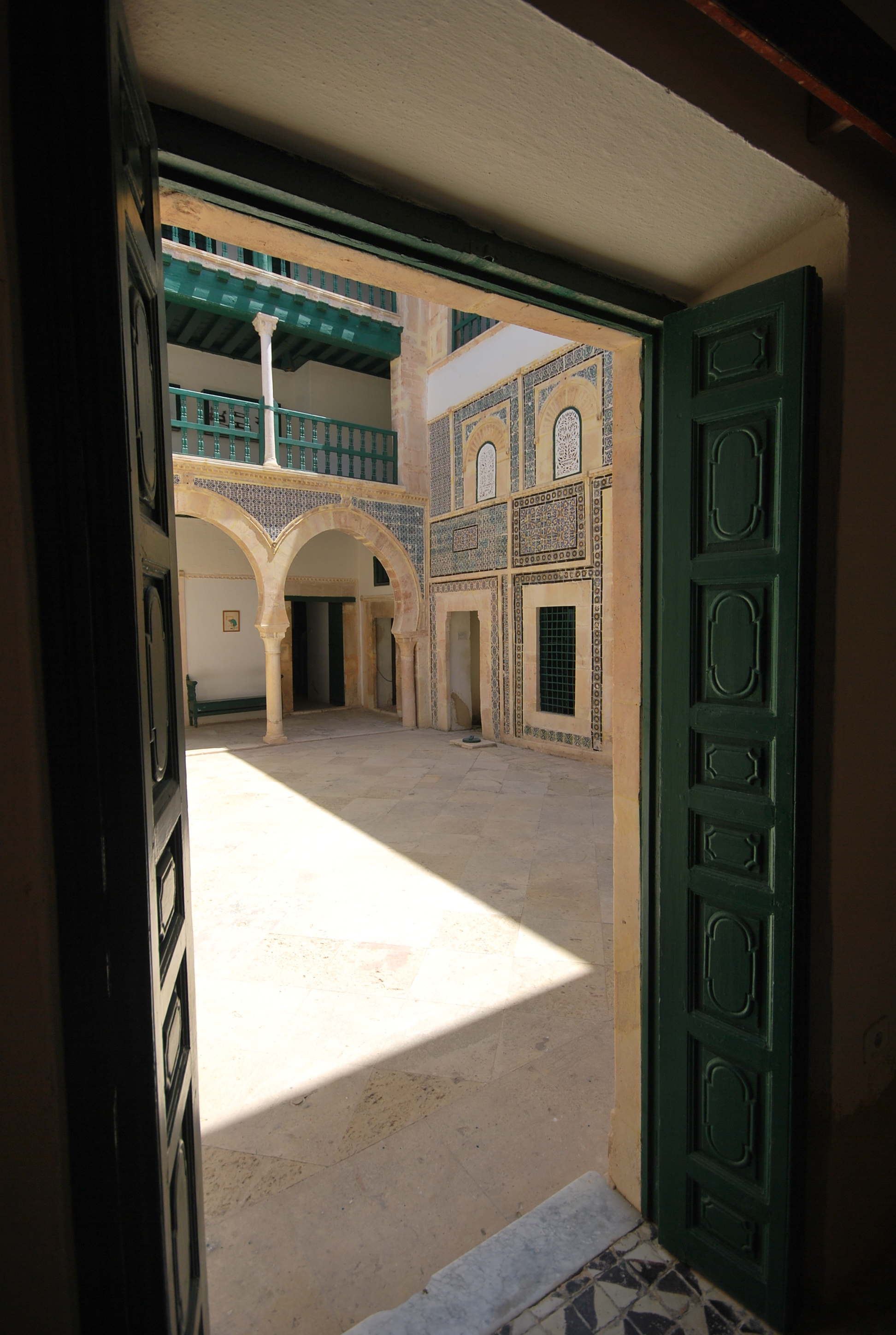

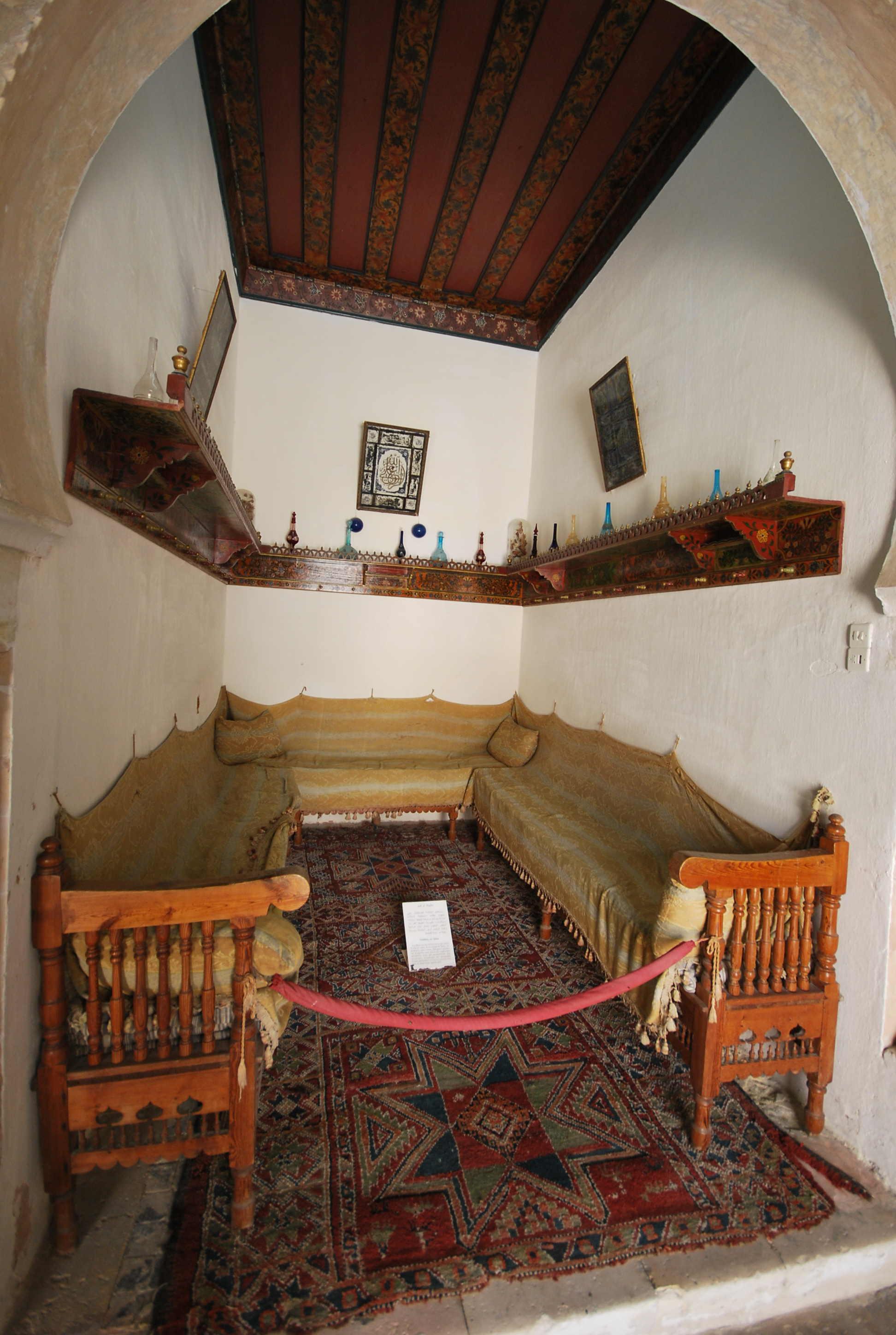

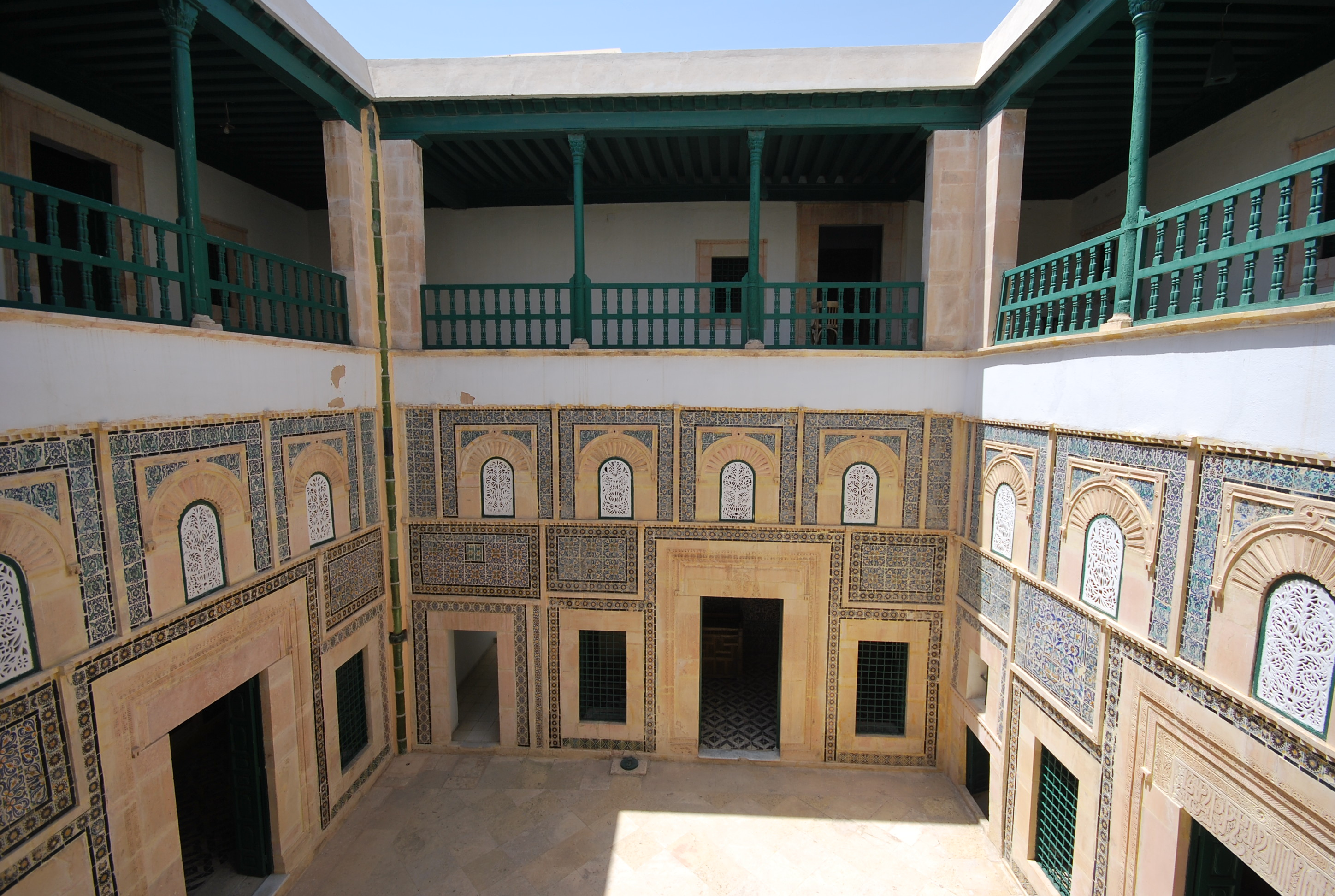

== Museum ==
In the hallways, scenes from the traditional daily life of the 18th-century Sfax were reconstructed in both urban and rural characters. On the first floor there are exhibition of several traditional costumes and on the second floor there are several oil paintings and Islamic calligraphy.

== See also ==
- Douz Museum
- Nabeul Museum
