= Jean-Claude Golvin =

French archaeologist and architect (born 1942)

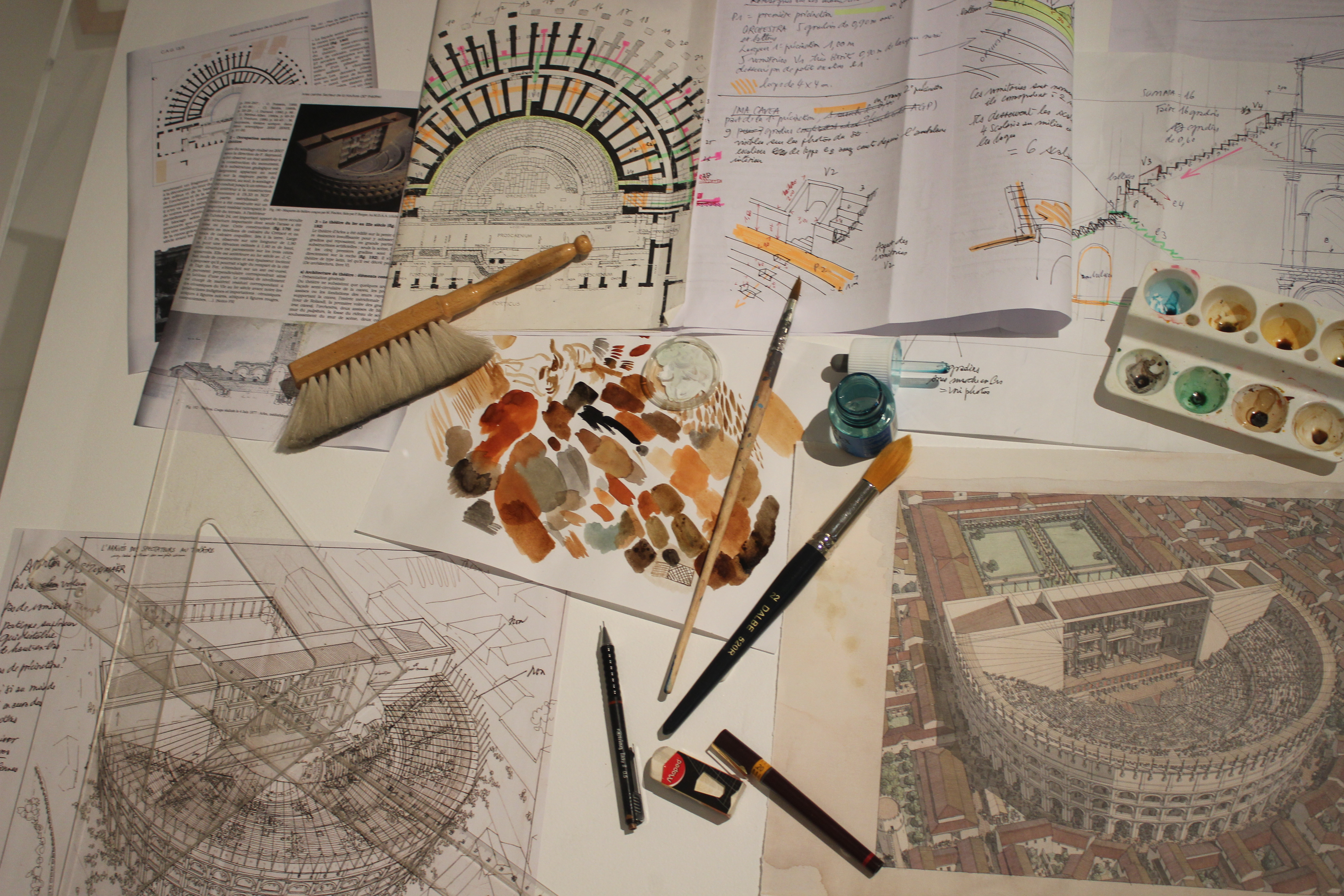
Workspace of Jean-Claude Golvin in a 2015 exhibition of his work.

Jean-Claude Golvin (born 18 December 1942) is a French archaeologist and architect. He specializes in the history of Roman amphitheatres and has published hundreds of reconstruction drawings of ancient monuments. Golvin is a researcher with the CNRS at the Bordeaux Montaigne University.

The son of art historian Lucien Golvin, he was born in Sfax (Tunisia) and studied in Algiers. As an architect, he worked on the restoration of the El Djem amphitheater, and led the French-Egyptian research center of Karnak and Luxor. He obtained a doctorate in archaeology in 1985 with a thesis on Roman amphitheaters.

Since 1989, Golvin's work has focused on creating watercolor illustrations of ancient and medieval cities as they appeared in their heyday. In 2010, he donated his body of work, over a thousand drawings and sketches, to the Arles Museum of Antiquities.
