= Thula =

Town in 'Amran Governorate, Yemen

- ثُلَاء (Arabic)
- Thila
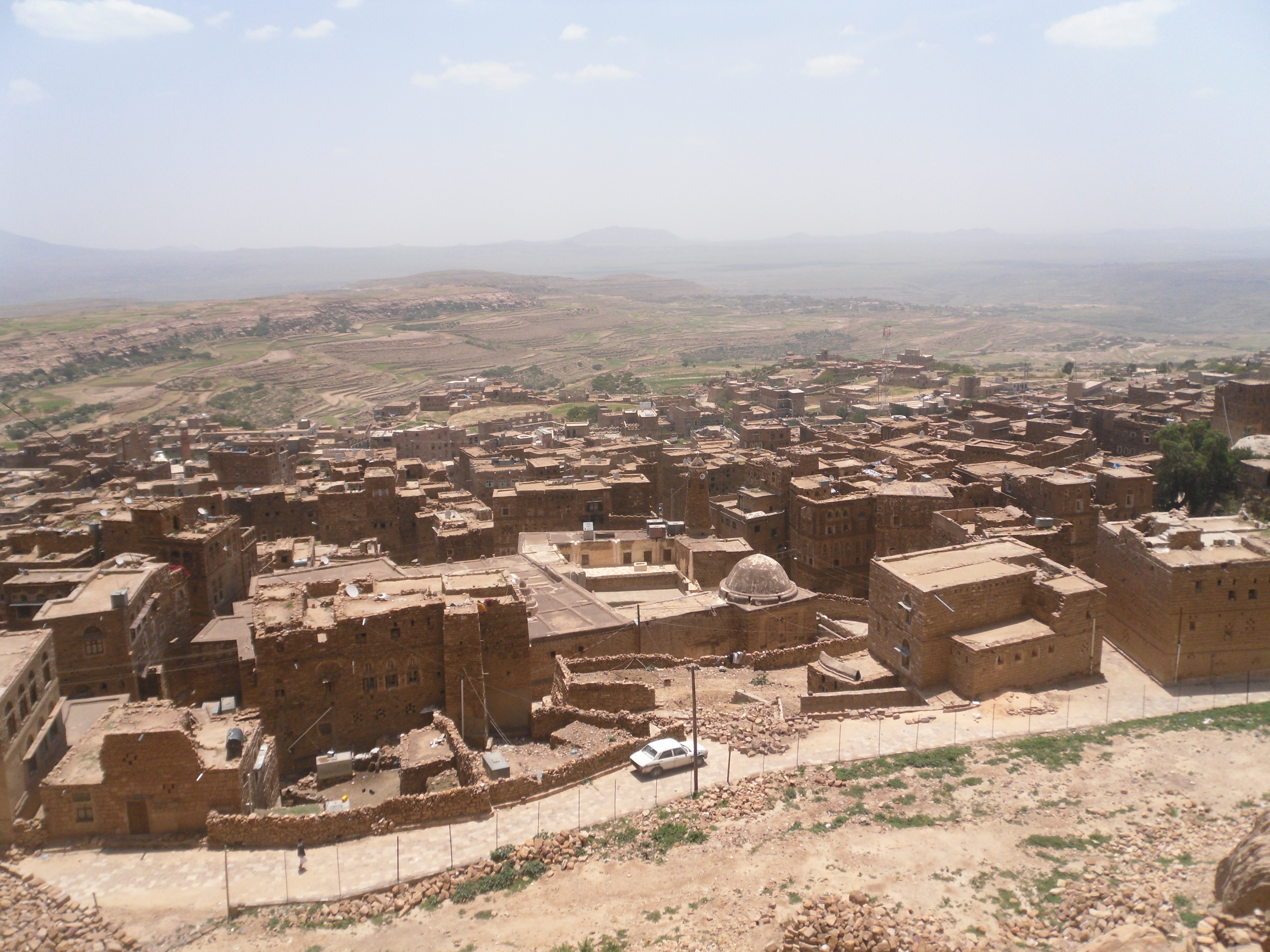
- Thula city

- Location within Yemen
- 15°34′25″N 43°54′05″E
- Location: Yemen
- Region: 'Amran Governorate

Thula (Arabic: ثُلَاء, romanized: Thulāʾ) or Thila (Arabic: ثِلَاء, romanized: Thilāʾ) is a town in west-central Yemen. It is located in the 'Amran Governorate.

Thula is one of five towns in Yemen on the UNESCO World Heritage Tentative List. Dating to the Himyarite period (between 110 BCE and the 6th century CE), the town is very well preserved and includes traditional houses and mosques. Archaeological investigation discovered Sabaean period ruins with massive stone architecture beneath the Himyarite. Restoration between 2004 and 2011, restored the Bab al Mayah gate, several watch towers, paths, the traditional cistern, and other portions of the Sabaean fort.

== World Heritage Status ==
This site was added to the UNESCO World Heritage Tentative List on July 8, 2002, in the Cultural category.

== Gallery ==
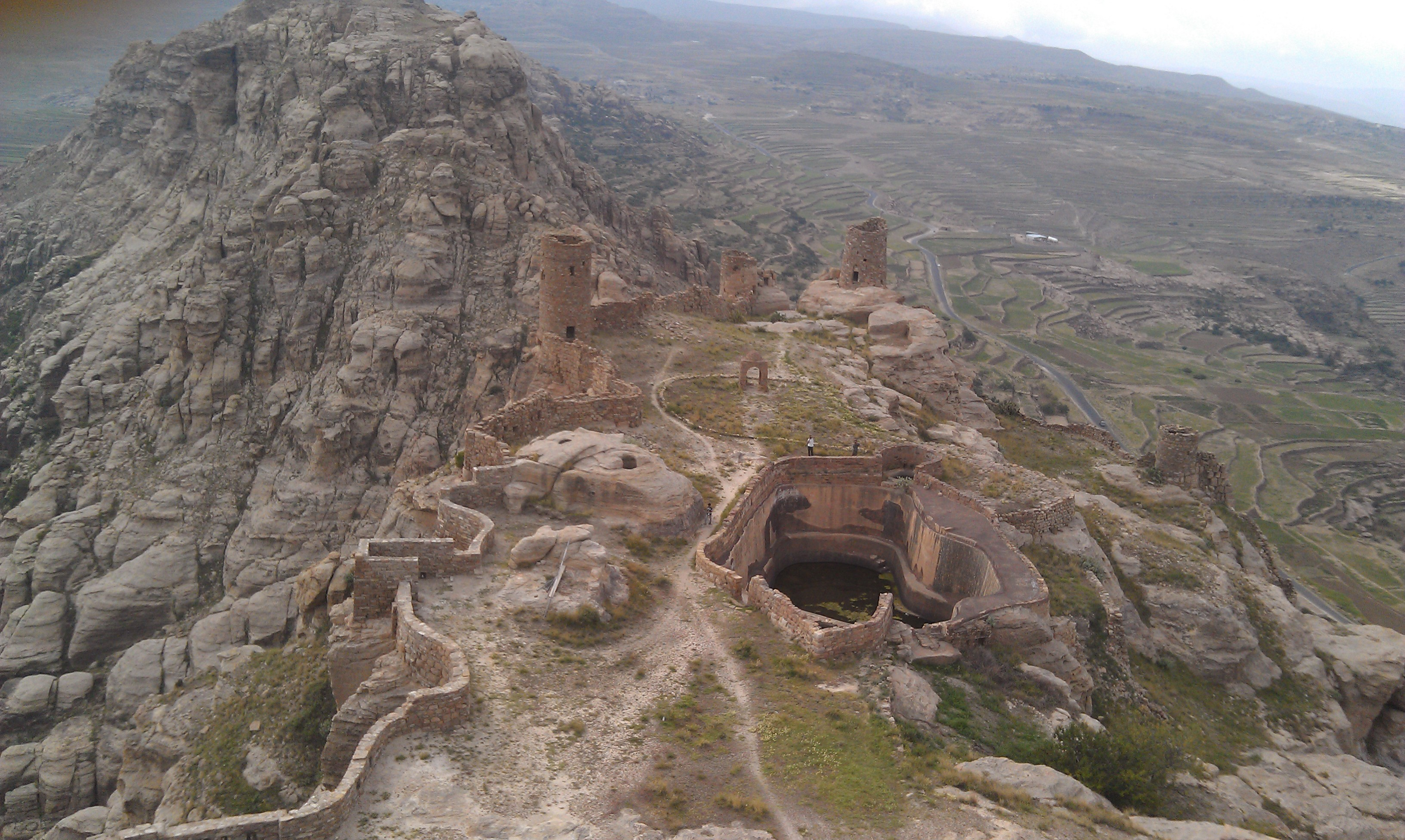
Top of the mountain showing half side of the fortification (Arabic: حِصْن ٱلْغُرَاب, romanized: Hiṣn Al-Ghurāb)

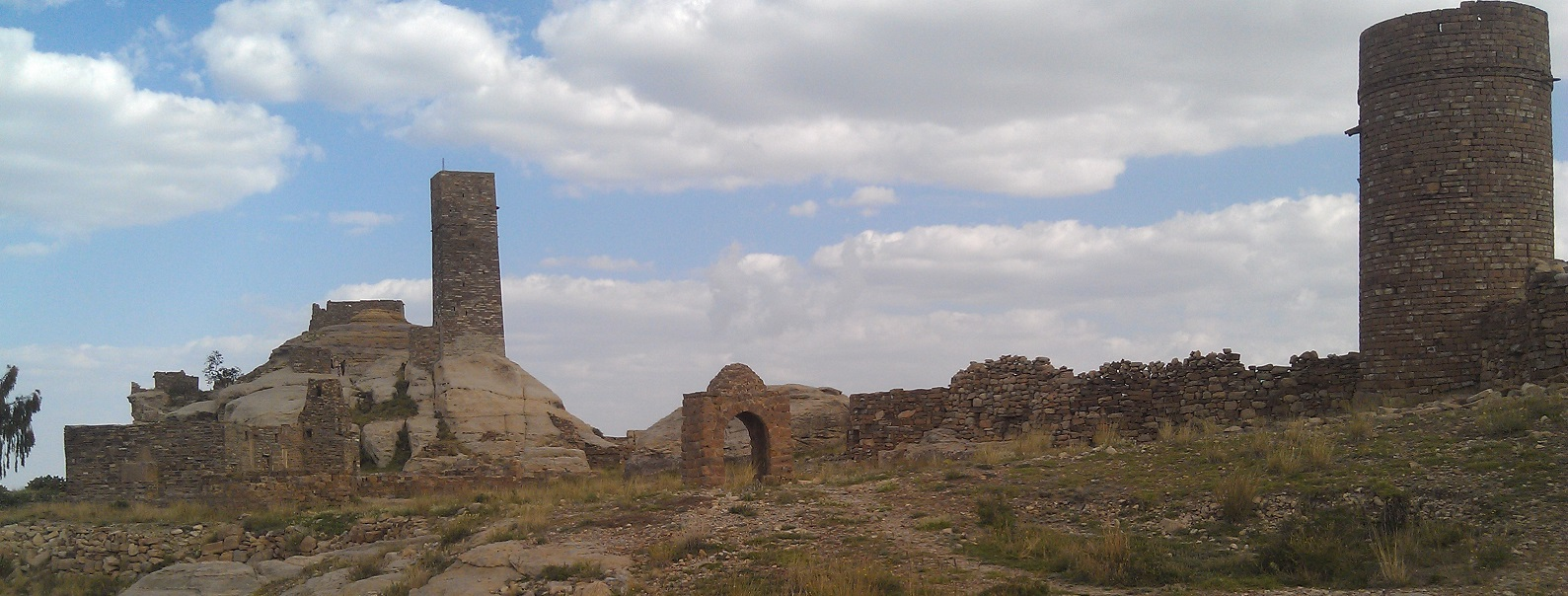
Other view of the fortification

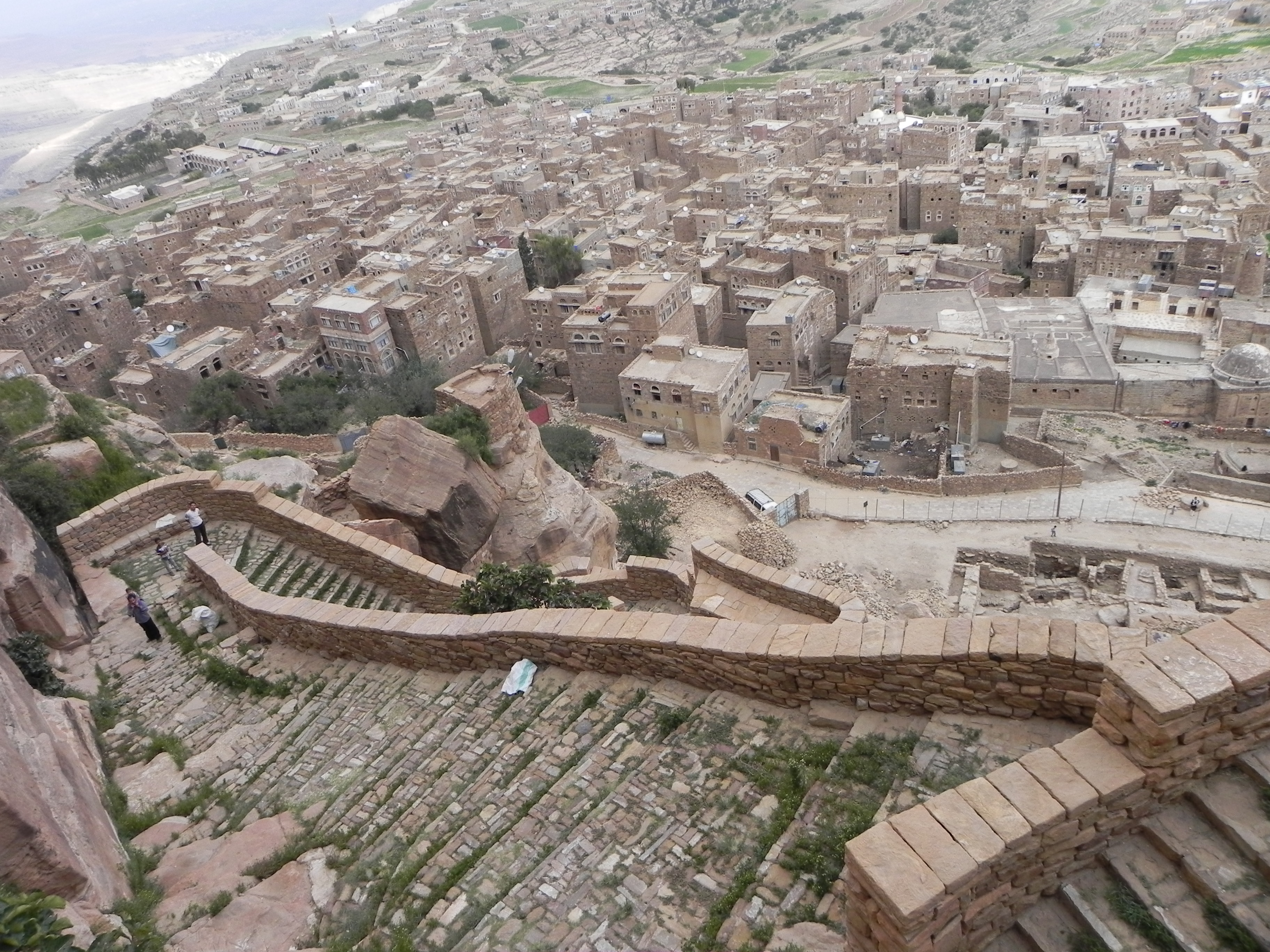
The mountain steps to the fortification

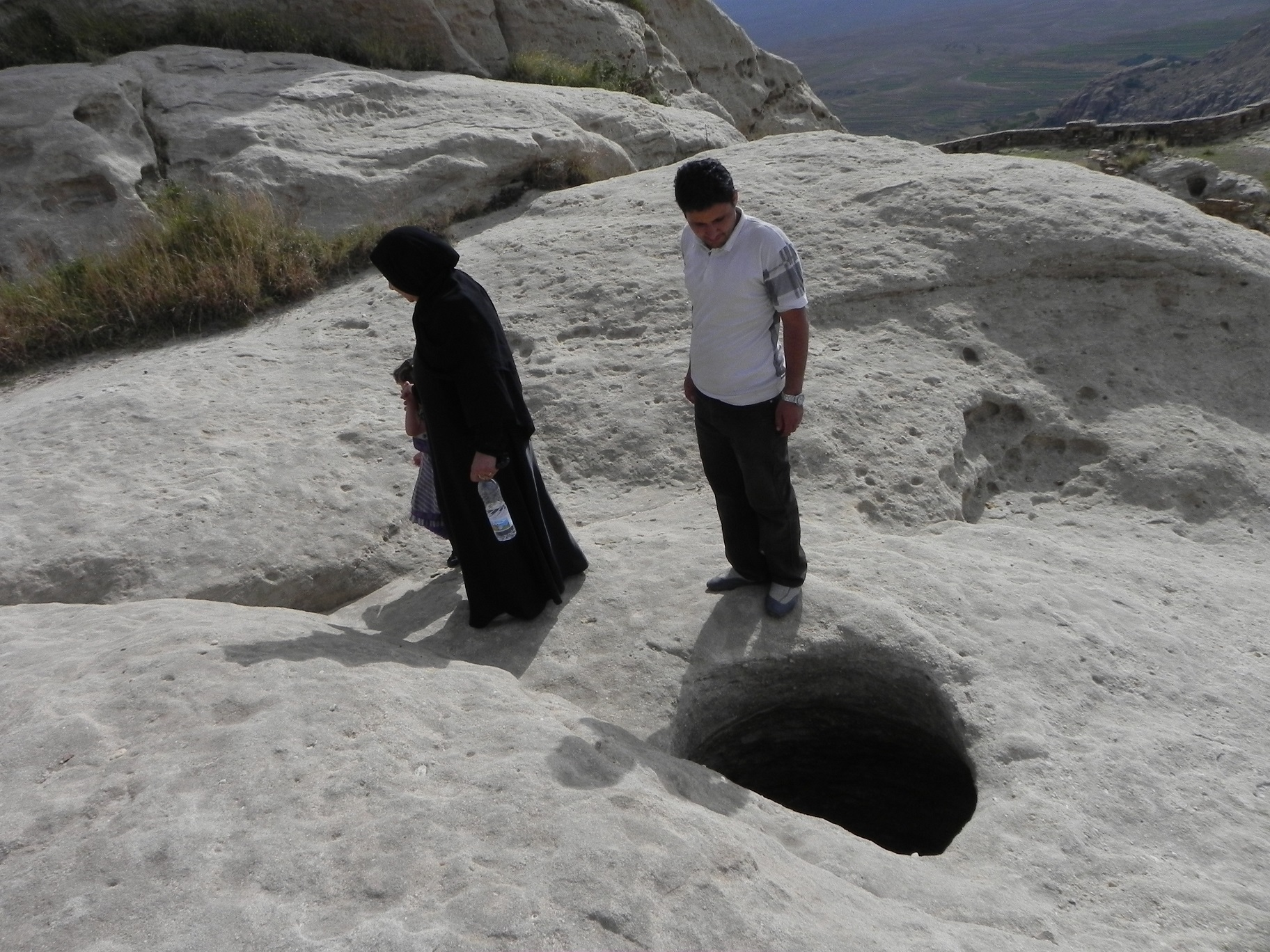
Some storage holes found in the fortification

== See also ==
- Thula District
