= El Djem Archaeological Museum =

Coordinates: 35°17′23″N 10°42′17″E

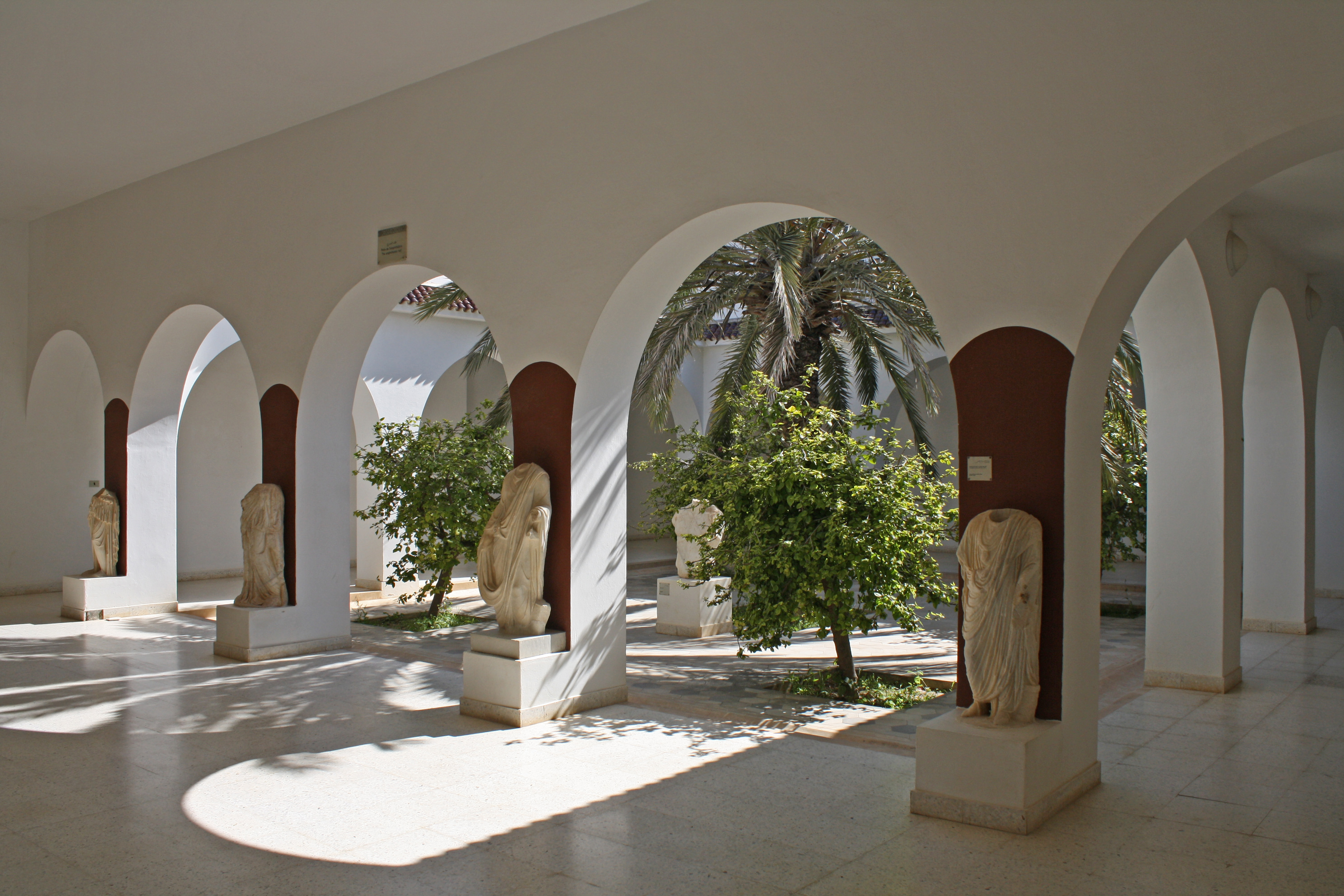
- El Djem Archaeological Museum patio
- Location: El Djem, Tunisia
- Type: archaeological museum
- Collection size: Roman period art

El Djem Archaeological Museum is an archaeological museum located in El Djem, Tunisia. It contains Roman era art, including mythological personages, abstract elements and fauna.

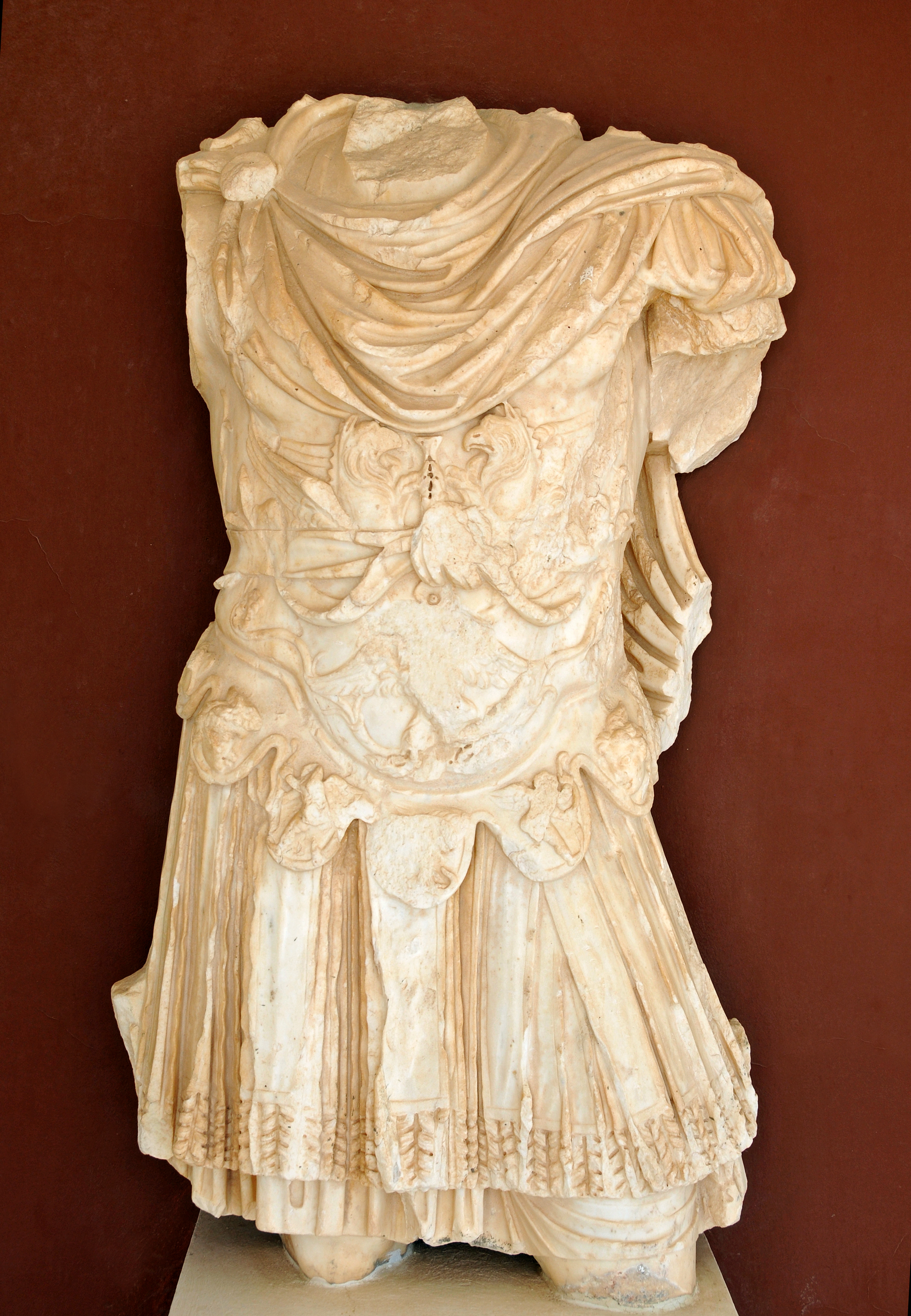

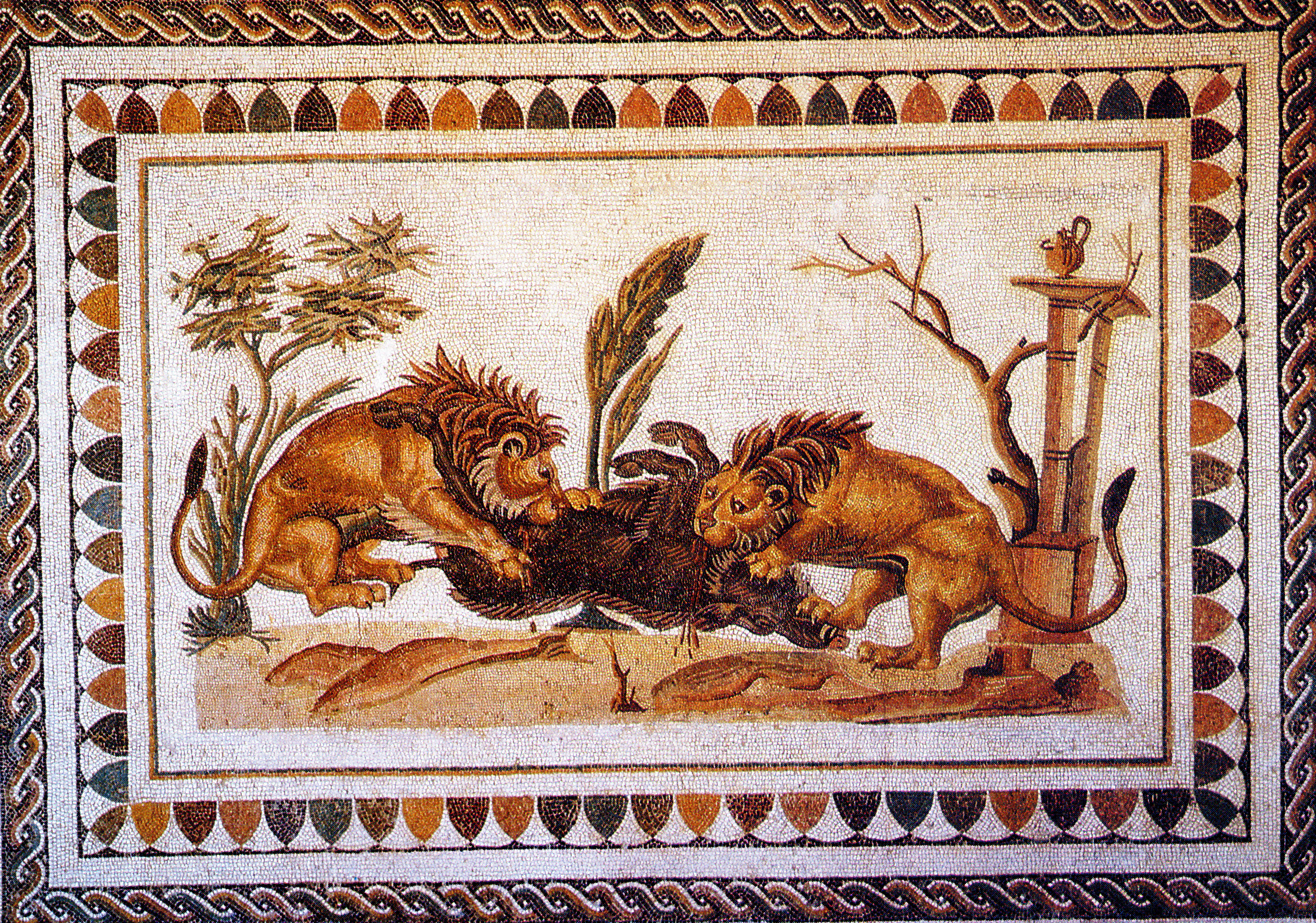

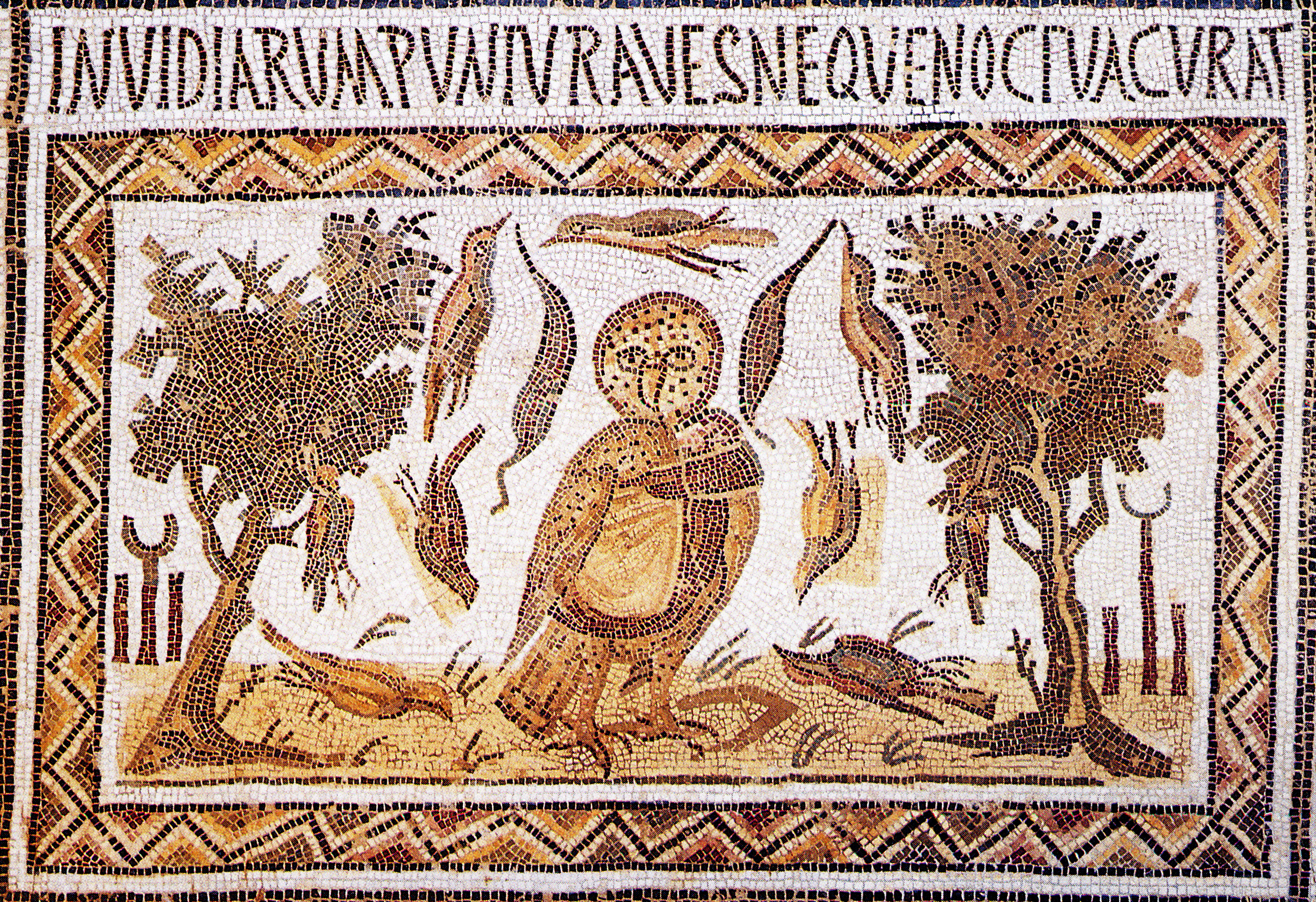

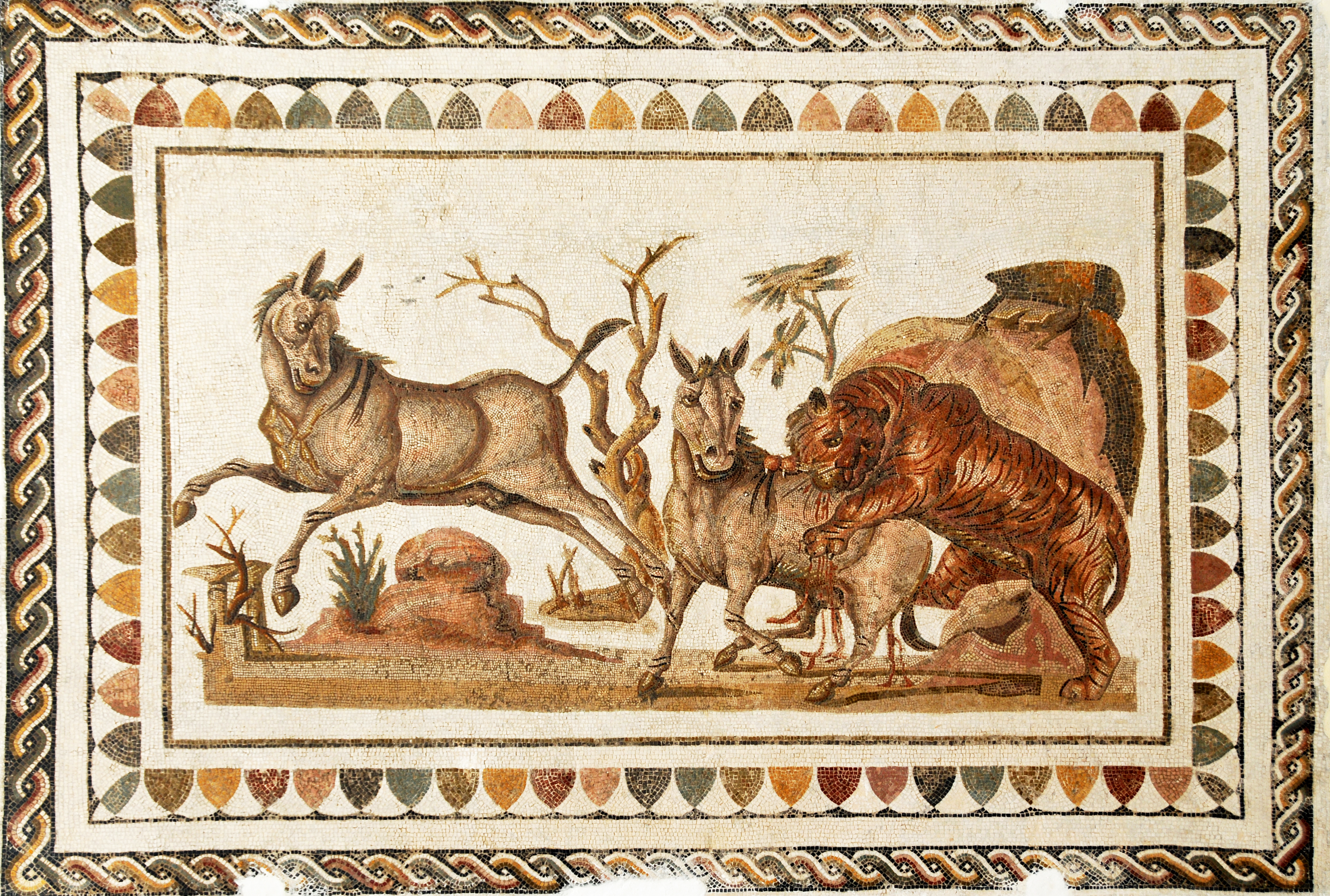

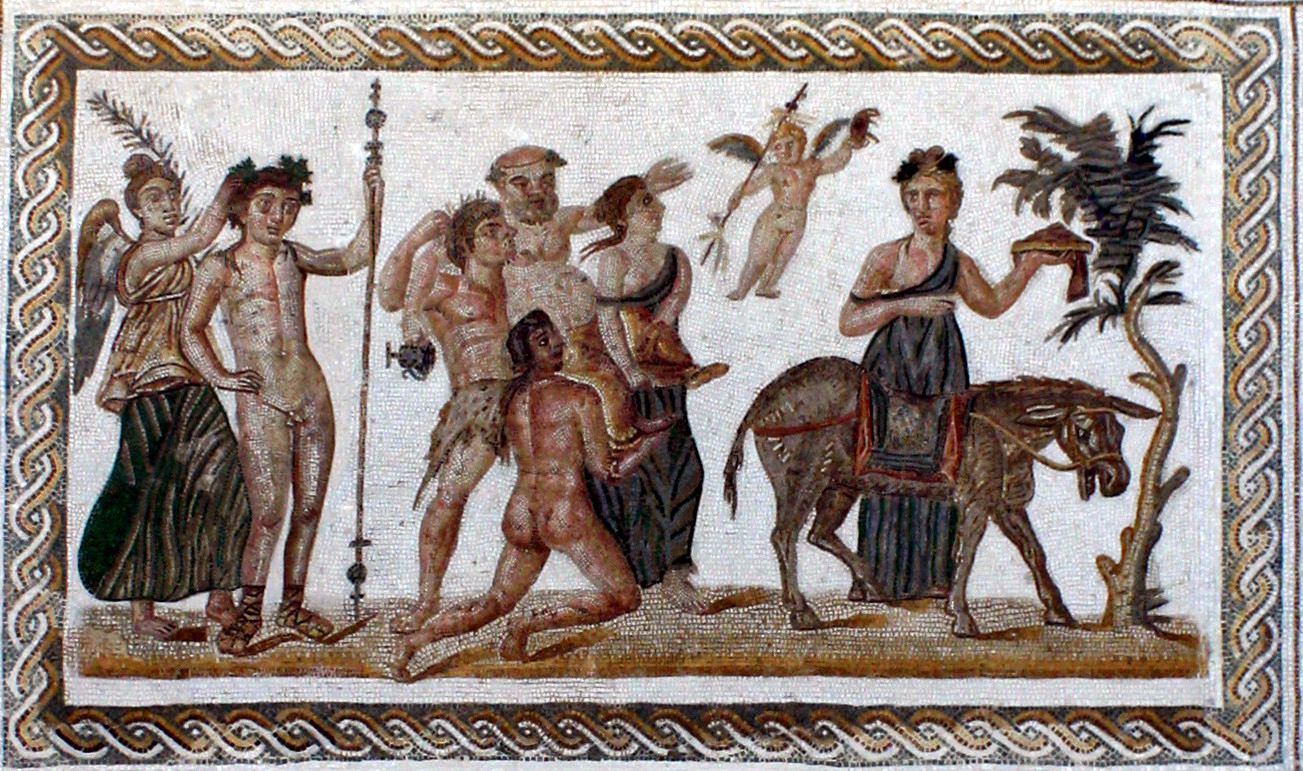

== See also ==
- African archaeology
- Chemtou Museum
- Culture of Tunisia
- List of museums in Tunisia
- Nabeul Museum
- Virtual Tunisian Culture
