= Salakta Archaeological Museum =

- المتحف الأثري بسلقطة.
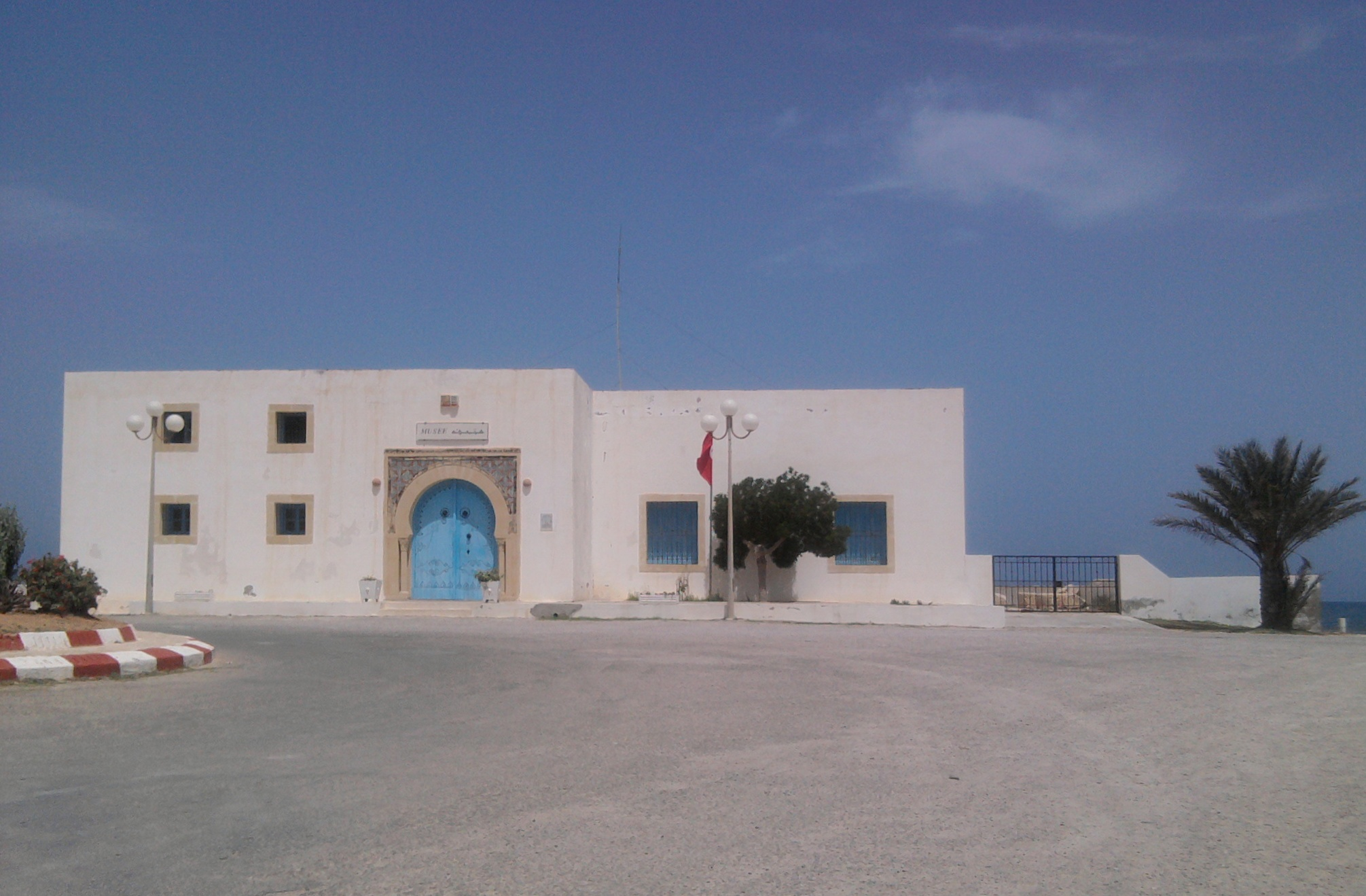
- Musée Salakta
- Established: 1980
- Location: Salakta, Tunisia
- Coordinates: 35°23′32″N 11°02′56″E
- Type: Archaeology museum
- Collection size: ancient Sullectum art

The Salakta Archaeological Museum is a Tunisian archaeological museum, located in Salakta. Established in 1980, it includes archaeological works from the ancient Sullectum, especially terra cotta, a mosaic pavement representing a gigantic African lion, and amphorae from other sites in the Sahel, Tunisia.

== See also ==
- African archaeology
- Culture of Tunisia
- List of museums in Tunisia
