= List of museums in Tunisia =

Following is a sortable list of museums in Tunisia.

Name	French-language native name	Arabic-language native name	City	Type	Year established	Official website	Coordinates
Bardo National Museum (Tunis)	Musée national du Bardo	المتحف الوطني بباردو	Tunis	national	1888	bardomuseum.tn	36°48′33.79″N 10°08′04.23″E
Bulla Regia Museum		المتحف الوطني ببولا ريجيا	Bulla Regia	archaeological	1982		
Carthage National Museum (formerly known as the Lavigerie Museum)		المتحف الوطني بقرطاج	Carthage	national	1875		36°51′12″N 10°19′26″E
Carthage Paleo-Christian Museum		المتحف المسيحي المبكر بقرطاج	Carthage	archaeological			
Chemtou Museum		متحف شمتو	Chemtou	archaeological site		chimtou.com	
Douz Museum		المتحف الأثري بدوز	Douz	municipal			
El Djem Archaeological Museum		المتحف الوطني بالجم	El Djem	archaeological			
El Kobba Museum	Musée El Kobba			history			
Museum of Popular Arts and Traditions of Le Kef	Musée des Arts et Traditions populaires du Kef	المتحف الأثري بالكاف	El Kef	municipal local history			
Enfidha Museum		المتحف الأثري بالنفيضة	Enfidha	municipal local history			
Ethnography Museum of Gabès	Musée ethnographique de Gabès	متحف الفنون الشعبية بقابس	Gabès	ethnography			
Finance Museum	Musée des finances			financial			
Gafsa Archaeological Museum		المتحف الوطني بقفصة	Gafsa	archaeological			
Kerkouane Archaeological Museum		المتحف الوطني بكركوان	Kerkouane	archaeological			
Lamta Archaeological Museum		المتحف الوطني بلمطة	Lamta	archaeological			
Mahdia Museum		المتحف الأثري بالمهدية	Mahdia	municipal local history		https://tunisiepatrimoine.tn/musees/musee-de-mahdia/apercu/	
Military Museum Of [the] Mareth Line	Le Musée Militaire de la ligne défensive de Mareth	المتحف العسكري لخط مـارث	Mareth	military history (WW2)		https://www.defense.tn/musee-militaire-de-la-ligne-defensive-de-mareth/?lang=fr	33.6178°N 10.2861°E
Museum of Islamic Art of Monastir	Musée des arts islamiques de Monastir	متحف الفنون الإسلامية بالمنستير	Monastir	archaeological			
Museum of the Sahara	Musée du Sahara		Douz	history			
Nabeul Museum		المتحف الأثري بنابل	Nabeul	municipal local history			
National History Museum	Musée de la mémoire nationale			national history museum			
National Museum of Islamic Art of Raqqâda	Musée national d'art islamique de Raqqâda	المتحف الوطني للفنون الإسلامية برقّادة	Raqqada, Kairouan	national	1986	https://www.tunisiepatrimoine.tn/en/museums/the-raqqada-national-museum-of-islamic-art/overview/	35.59490382218076°N 10.062462906658675°E
National Museum of Medicine	Musée national de la médecine			national medical			
Oceanography Museum of Salammbô	Musée océanographique de Salammbô			oceanography			
Postal Museum of Tunisia	Musée postal de Tunis	متحف البريد		postal			
Salakta Archaeological Museum		المتحف الوطني بسلقطة	Salakta	archaeological			
Sfax Archaeological Museum		المتحف الأثري بصفاقس	Sfax	archaeological			
Sousse Archaeological Museum		المتحف الوطني بسوسة	Sousse	archaeological			
Zarzis Museum		المتحف الأثري بجرجيس	Zarzis	municipal local history			
	Musée Dar Cheraït	متحف دار شريط	Tozeur	history			
Dar Essid Museum	Musée Dar Essid			history			
Dar Jellouli Museum	Musée Dar Jellouli		Sfax	history			
	Musée de Sidi Amor Abada		Kairouan	history			
	Musée des arts et traditions populaires de Djerba	متحف الفنون والتقاليد الشعبية بجربة	Djerba	history			
	Musée des arts et traditions populaires de Monastir	متحف الفنون والتقاليد الشعبية بالمنستير	Monastir	history			
	Musée des arts et traditions populaires de Tunis	متحف الفنون والتقاليد الشعبية بتونس	Tunis	history			
	Musée du patrimoine insulaire de Kerkennah			history			

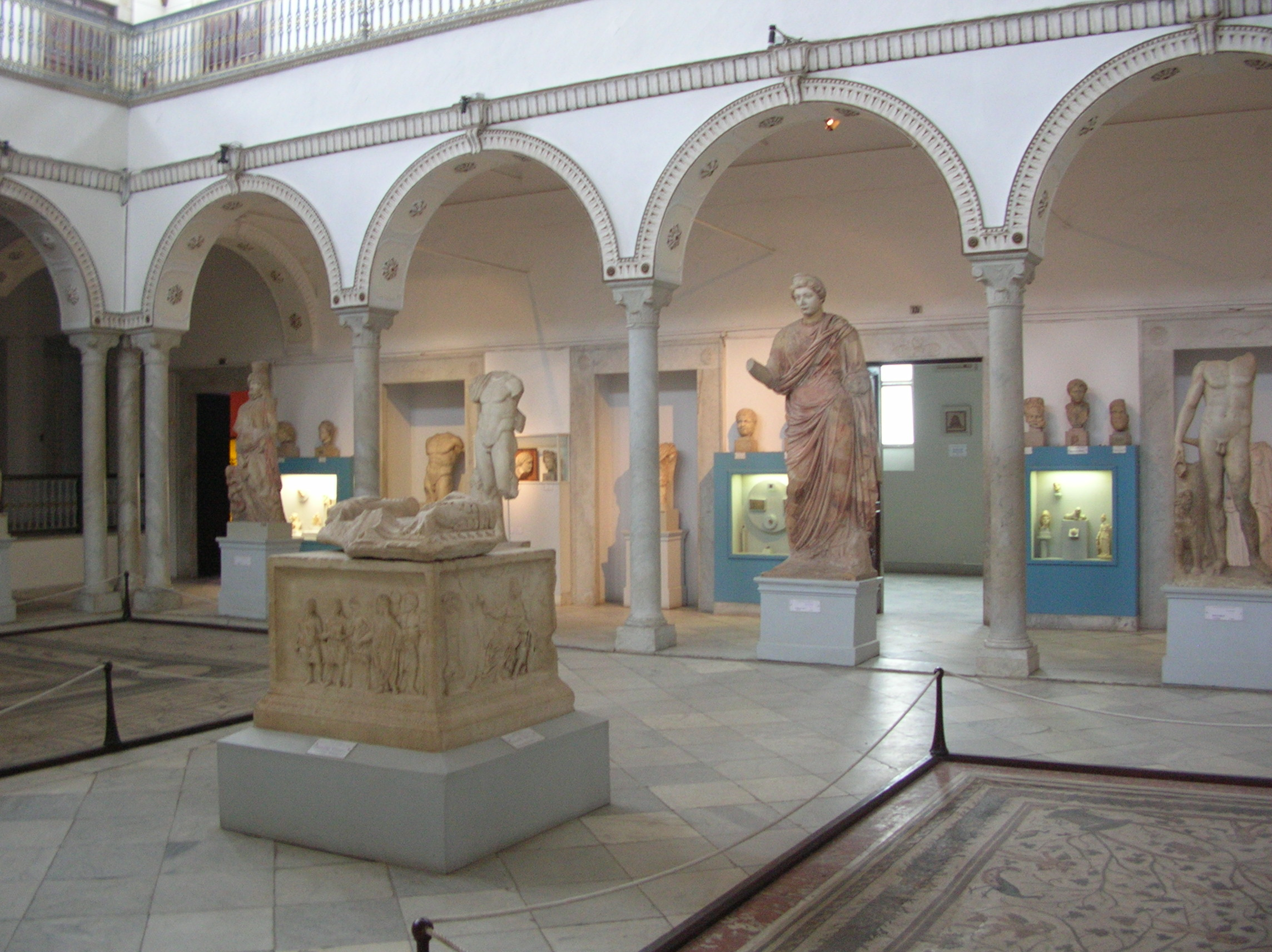
Bardo Museum

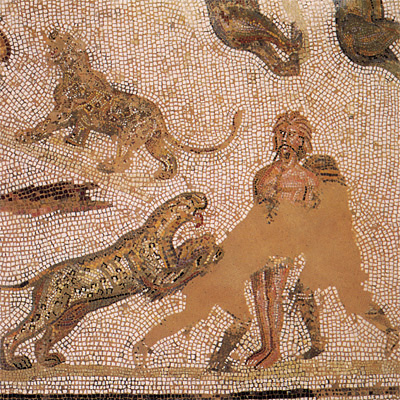
Sousse Archaeological Museum

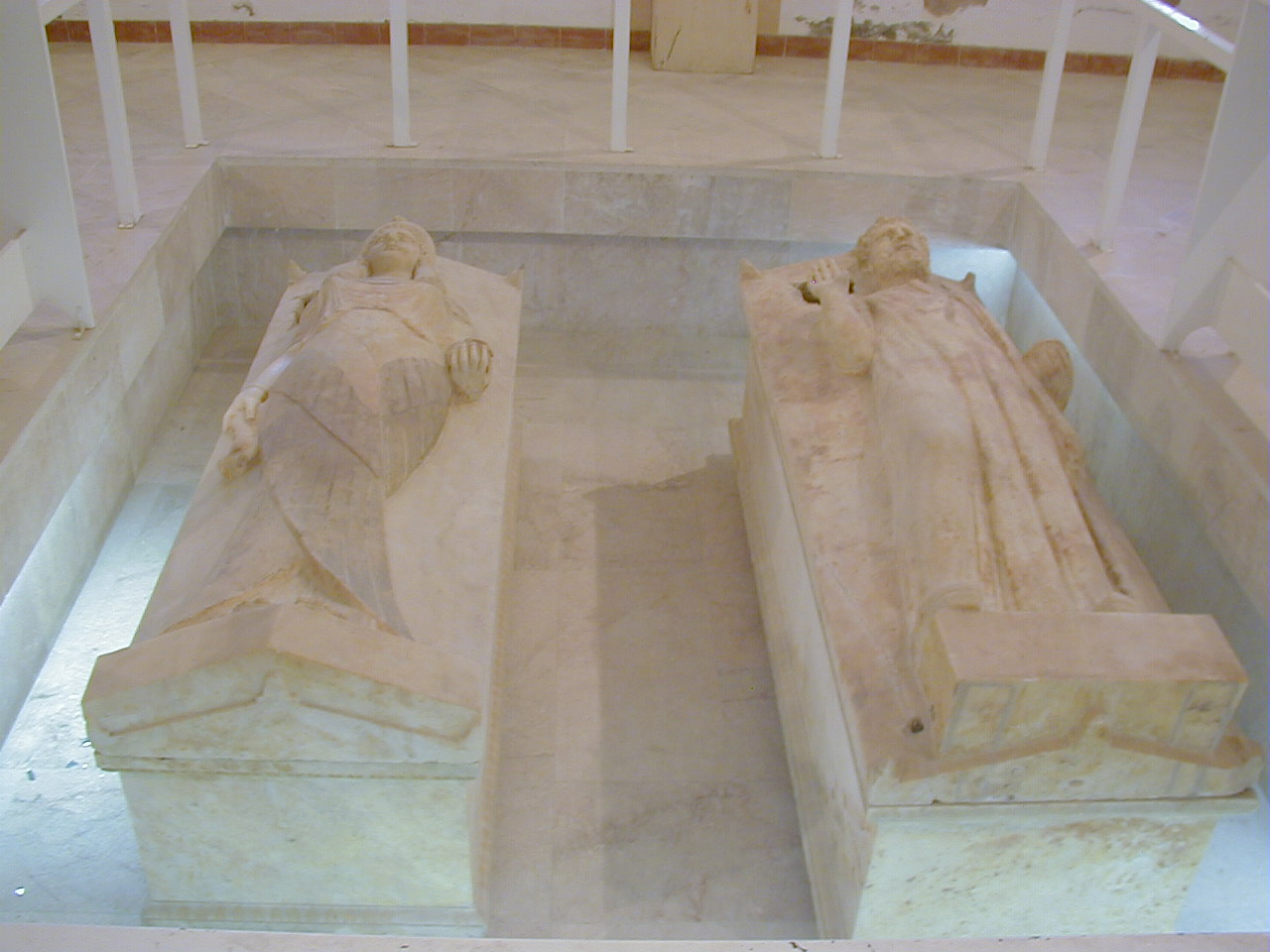
Carthage National Museum

== See also ==
- Culture of Tunisia
- List of museums
