= Gafsa Archaeological Museum =

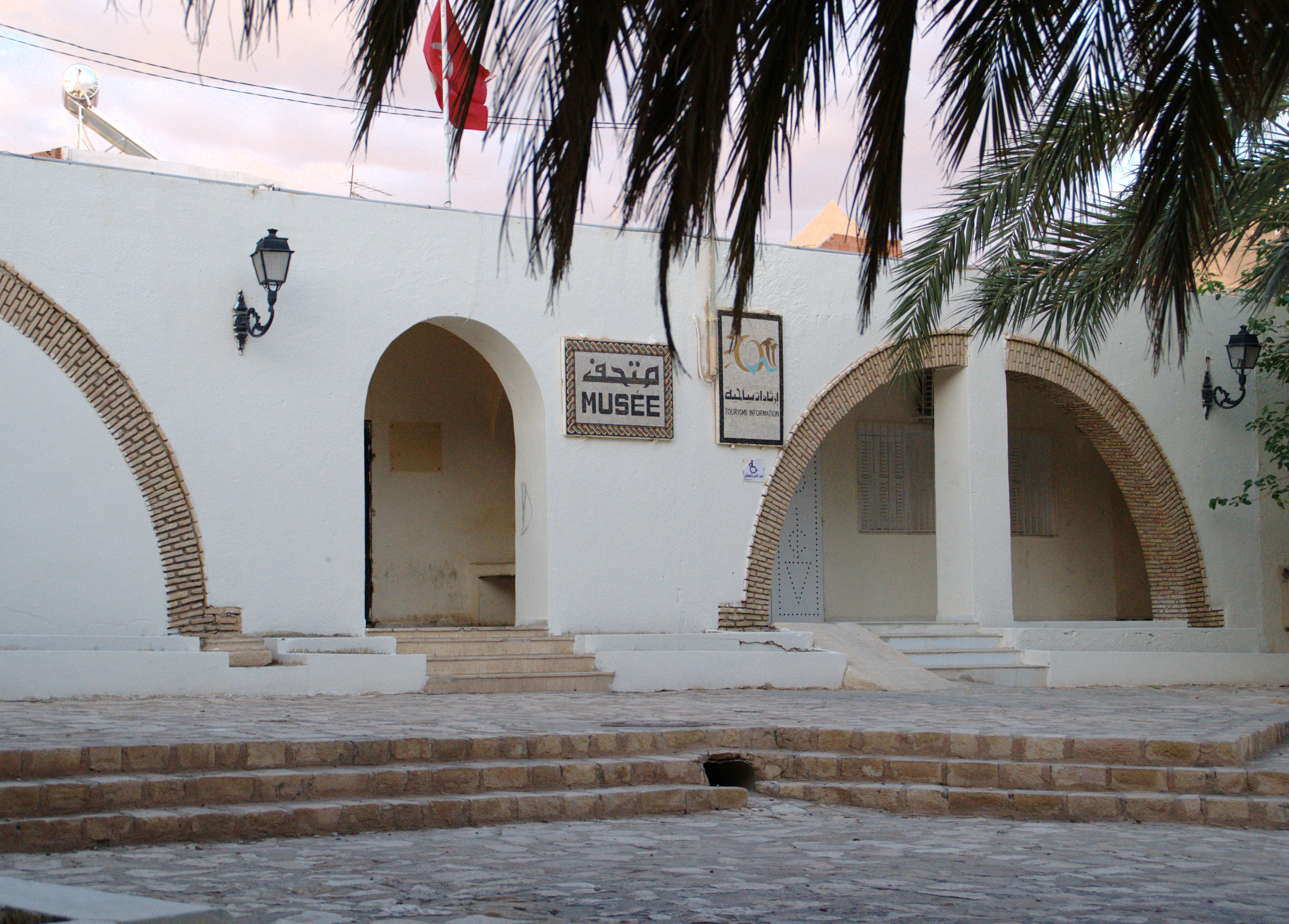
- Location: Gafsa, Tunisia
- Coordinates: 34.41598°N 8.78717°E
- Type: archaeological museum
- Collection size: Capsian flint & lithic tools, Roman coins & sculpture

Gafsa Archaeological Museum is an archaeological museum in Gafsa, Tunisia. It sits in the old city center. Opposite the museum are ancient Roman pools.

== History of Gafsa ==
A large section of the museum is dedicated to the period of history when it was under Roman control. Gafsa was once a Roman frontier town, the headquarters of a garrison. A high-ranking military chief would usually be in command of the garrison and reside in Gafsa. Articles used in everyday life, such as jewelry and coins, as well as other artifacts like sculptures and mosaics, are a part of this collection. One of the best artifacts is the mosaic pavement that shows a circus game. It dates from the 4th century AD.

== Exhibits ==
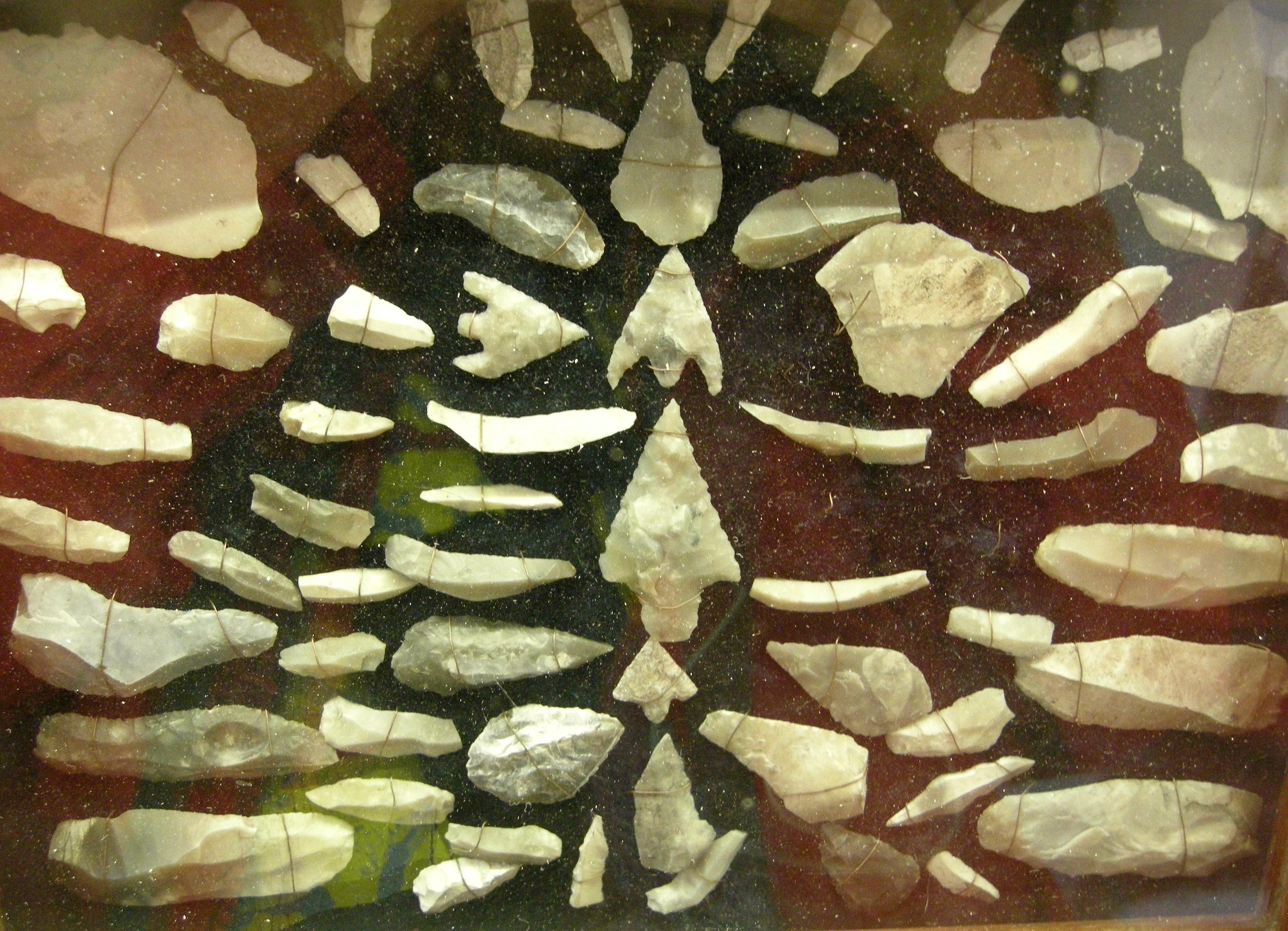
Stone tools similar to those at display in the Gafsa Museum

The Gafsa Museum has an extensive collection of prehistoric flint and lithic tools as well as other tools fashioned out of bone. Objects depicting human and animal figures and paraphernalia suggesting spiritual life are also part of the museum collection. The museum houses not only artifacts from the city but also from the surrounding areas. One of the museum's most prized assets is a Capsian figurine dating back to 8000 BC. This indicates that Gafsa, after which the Capsian culture was named, has been inhabited since the Mesolithic epoch.

== See also ==
- African archaeology
- Culture of Tunisia
- List of museums in Tunisia
