= Kerkouane Archaeological Museum =

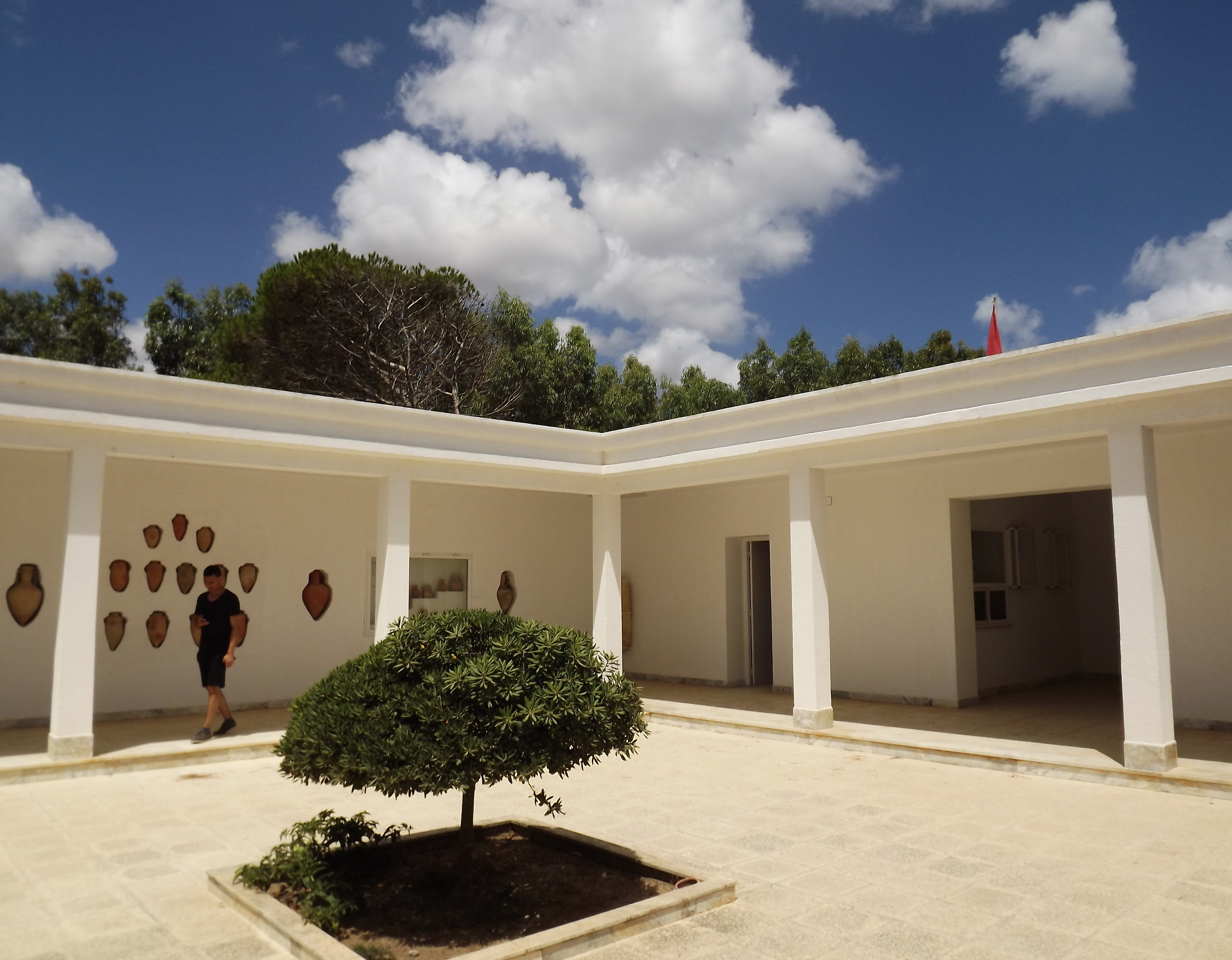
- Kerkouane Archaeological Museum
- Location: Kerkouane, Tunisia
- Coordinates: 36.95°N 11.1°E
- Type: archaeological museum

Kerkouane Archaeological Museum is an archaeological museum located in Kerkouane, Tunisia. It contains statuary, jewelry and ceramic art.

== See also ==
- African archaeology
- Culture of Tunisia
- List of museums in Tunisia
