= Sousse Archaeological Museum =

Archaeological museum in Tunisia

Coordinates: 35°49′19″N 10°38′07″E

- Musée archéologique de Sousse
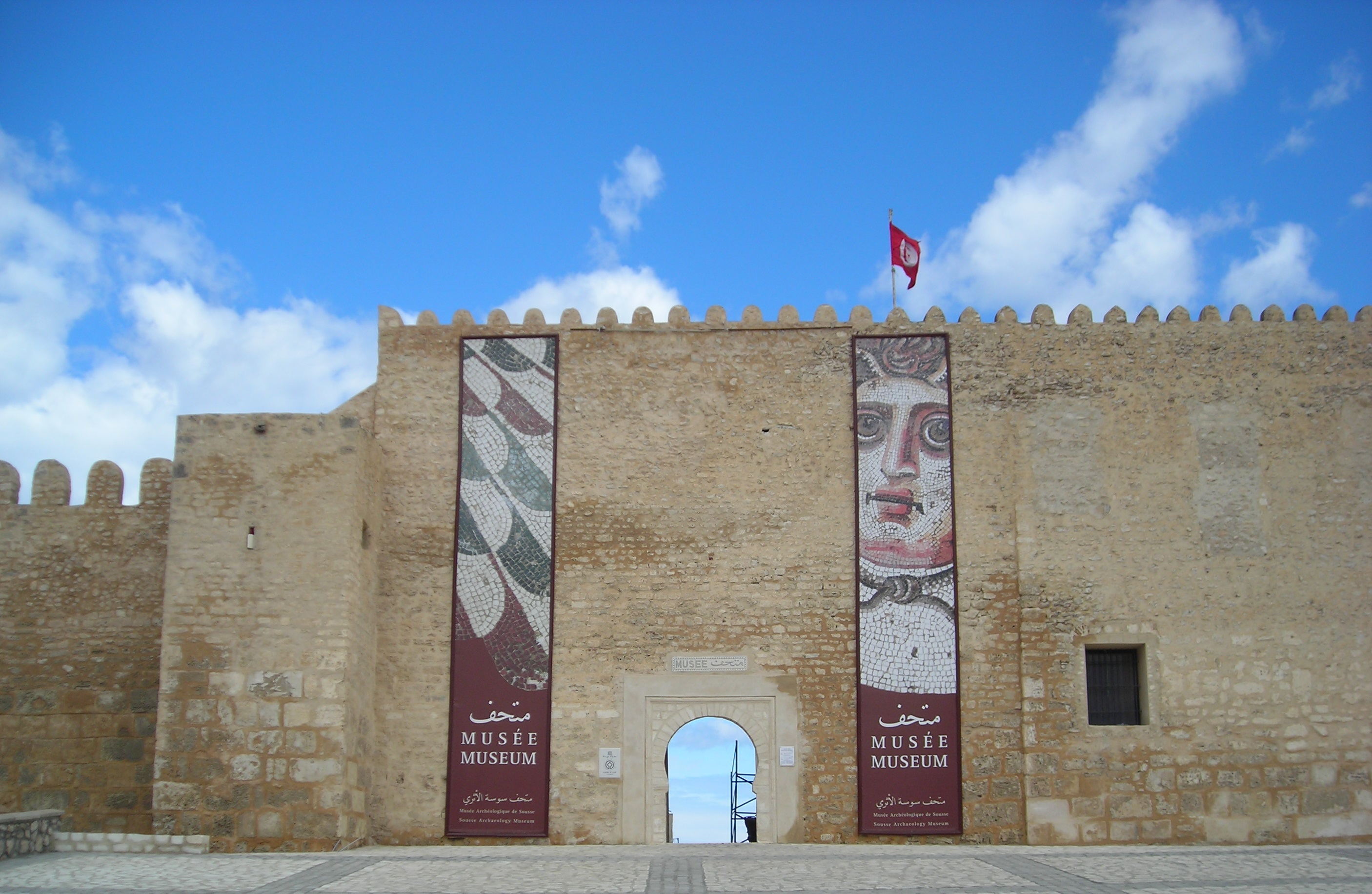
- Established: 1951 (reopen in 2012 after reorganisation of the collections and restoration of the building were completed)
- Location: Sousse, Governorate of Sousse, Tunisia
- Type: Archaeological museum
- Collection size: Phoenician (Punic, Carthaginian), Roman, Byzantine, Christian

The Sousse Archaeological Museum (Tunisian Arabic: المتحف الأثري بسوسة) is an archaeological museum located in Sousse, Sousse Governorate, Tunisia.

== Overview ==
The museum is housed in the Kasbah of Sousse's Medina, which was founded in the 11th century AD. It was established in 1951. The museum reopened its doors to the public in 2012, after the collections were rearranged and the edifice was renovated. It contains the second largest collection of mosaics in the world after that of the Bardo National Museum in the capital Tunis.

== Collections ==
The museum's collections include:

- Punic votive stelae and urns dating from as early as the 7th century BC.
- Artefacts dating from the antiquity up to the 2nd century BC, discovered by French archeologist Pierre Cintas in the Tophet of Sousse and in the Sanctuary of Baal Hammon.
- Mosaics depicting mythological figures, including among others:
  - "Head of Medusa"
  - Face of Oceanus
  - Neptune on his sea-chariot
  - a Nilotic landscape
- Marble statues from the Roman time period such as the bust of emperor Hadrian and the statue of Roman fertility and manhood god Periapus with his sizeable phallus.
- Funerary artifacts from Hadrumetum (the antique name of Sousse). These were discovered in Sousse's two complexes of catacombs dating to the Roman period, named the Catacomb of Hermes and the Catacomb of Good Shepherd. The latter is named after a marble tablet engraved with a figure of a shepherd carrying on its shoulder a sheep discovered in the catacombs. The tablet, now in the museum's collection, is a Christian representation of the Good Shepherd theme, illustrating Jesus' self-description in the Gospel of John (I am the good shepherd, who is willing to die for the sheep) as well as illustrating the parabole of the lost sheep comparing God seeking lost humans as a shepherd leaving his 99 sheep to look for the one lost sheep, "When he has found it, he carries it on his shoulders, rejoicing".
- Christian themed decorative terracotta tablets, including:
  - a representation of Adam & Eve covering themselves after having eaten the forbidden fruit)
  - a Byzantine period baptismal font, covered with colorful mosaics and found in the nearby town of Bekalta.
- Items from Greece, including oil lamps, found within the local Punic tombs at El-Kasabah, including:
  - pottery
  - oil lamps
  - marble funerary epitaphs engraved in Greek and Latin languages.

== Gallery ==
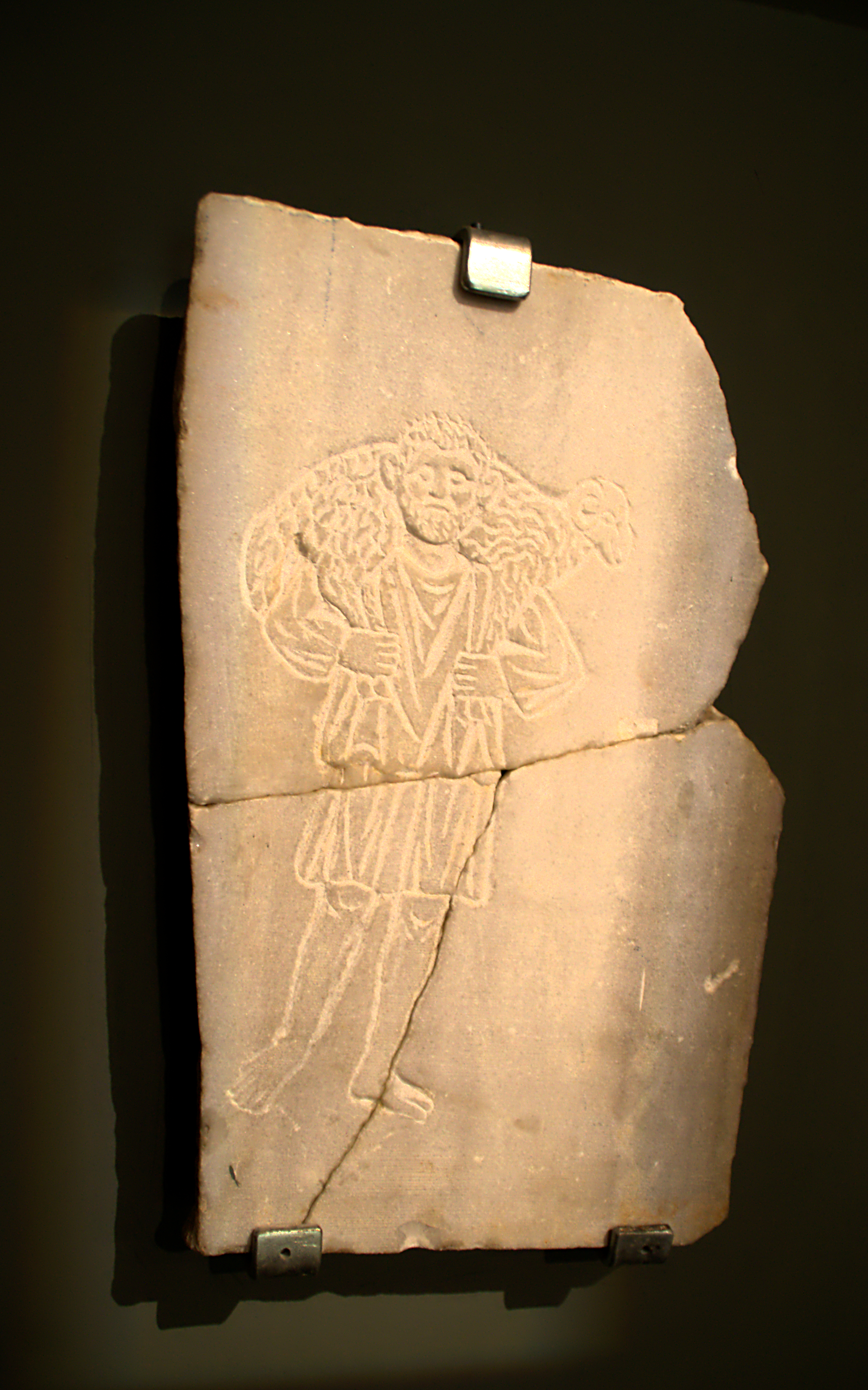
Representation of the Good Shepherd

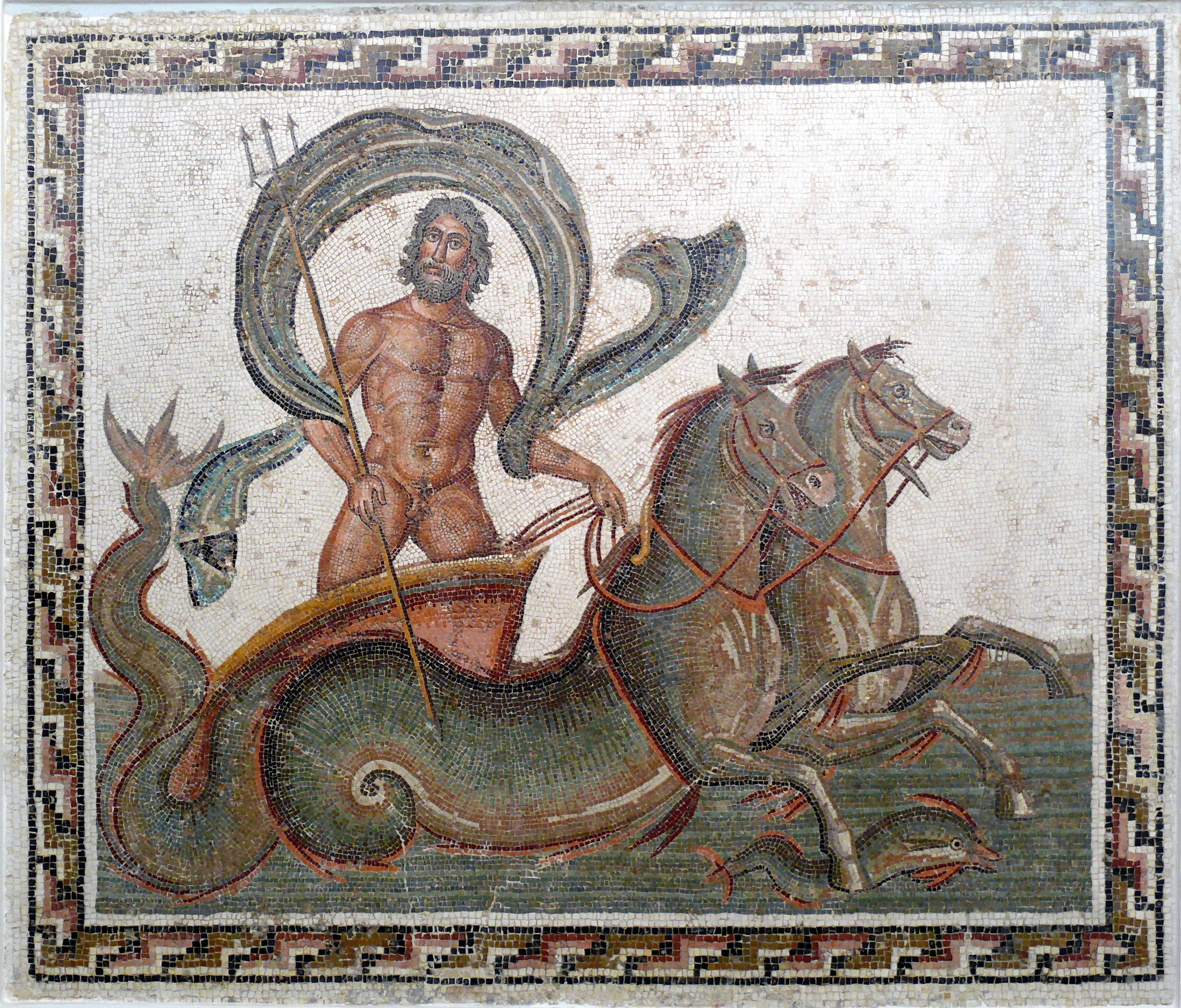
Mosaic of Neptune

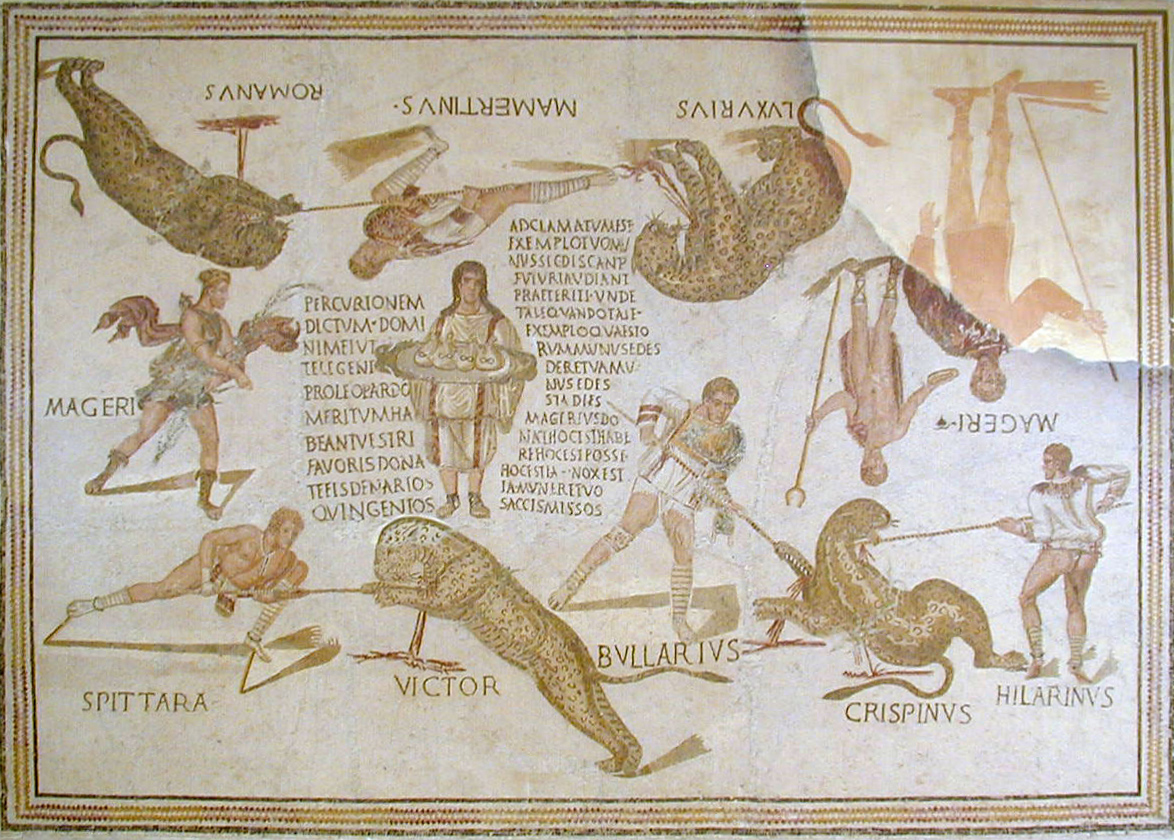
Magerius Mosaic: Mosaic from the 3rd century AD discovered in the village of Smirat, Tunisia, representing a hunt of wild beasts in the amphitheater, with lengthy written explanations

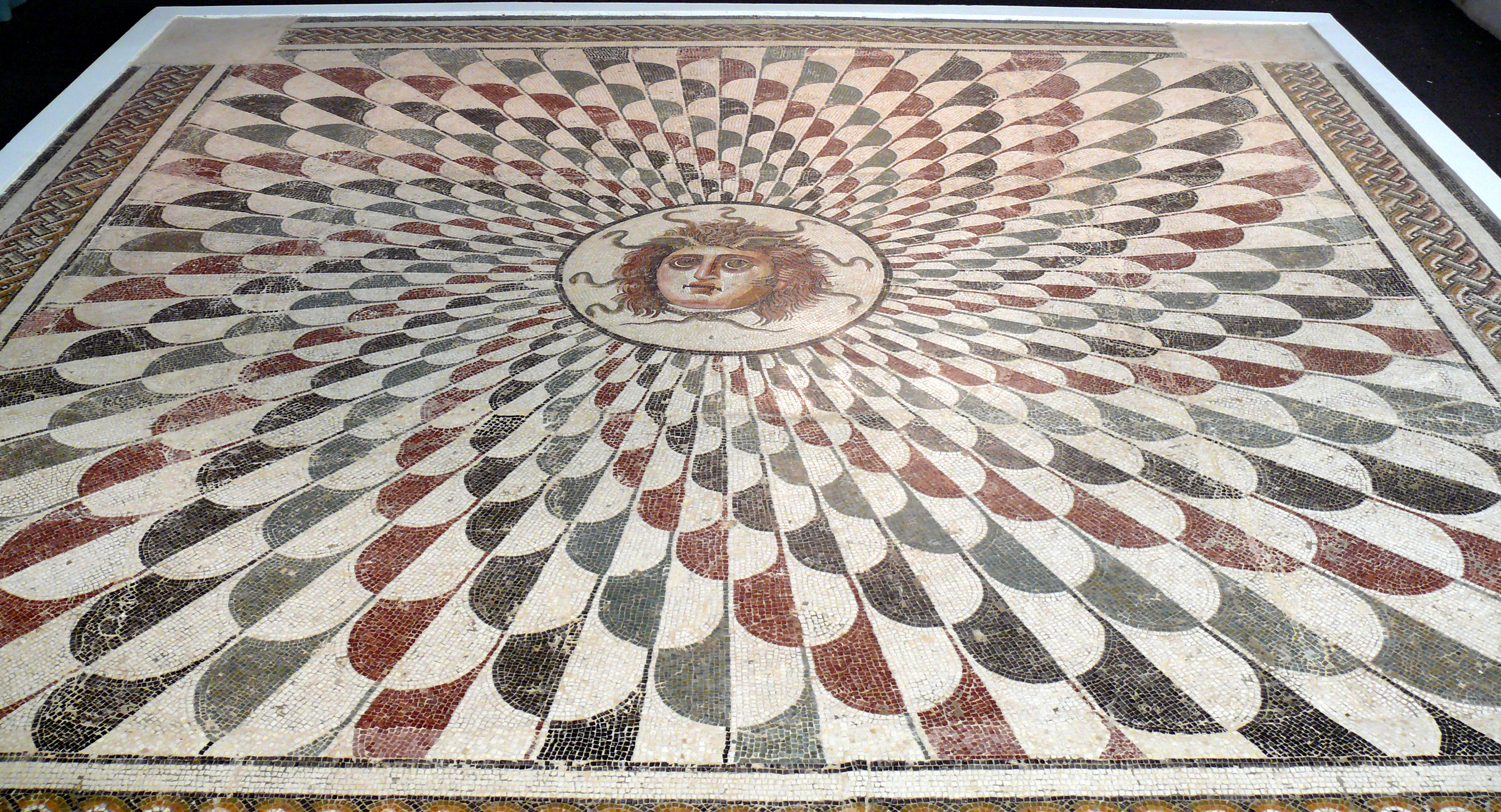
2nd century mosaic depicting the Gorgon with wings on her brows, her head surrounded by snakes

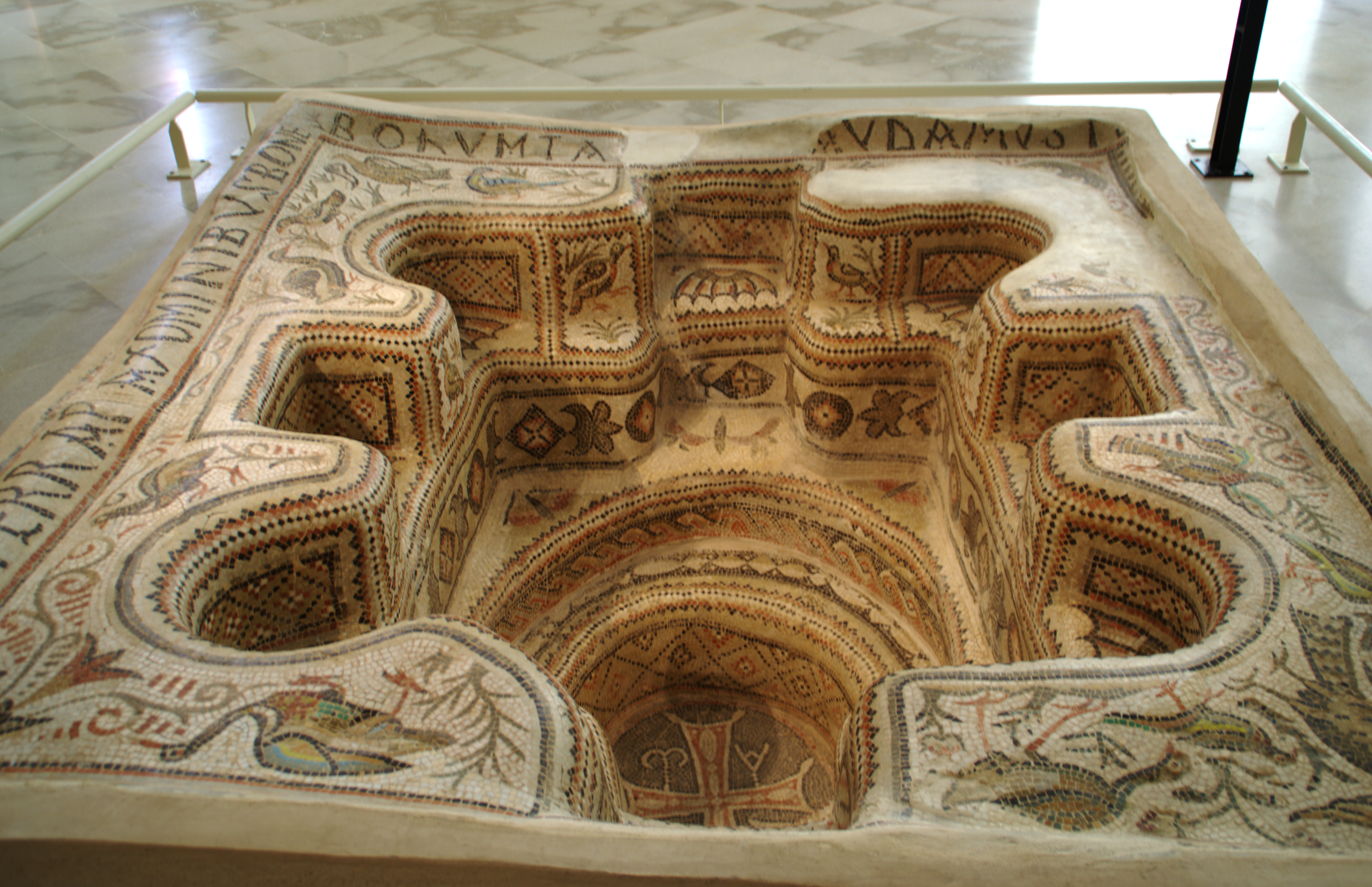
Baptismal fonts from the Byzantine period found in Bekalta displayed at the Sousse Archeological Museum.

== See also ==
- African archaeology
- Culture of Tunisia
- List of museums in Tunisia
