= Sfax Archaeological Museum =

Coordinates: 34.7322°N 10.7639°E

- Established: 1907
- Location: Sfax, Tunisia
- Type: archaeological museum

The Sfax Archaeological Museum is an archaeological museum located in Sfax, Tunisia.

== History ==
The Sfax Archaeological Museum was established in 1907, making it the third oldest museum in the country. During World War II, the museum was hit by bombings. The first exhibition room opened in 1955. Three new rooms opened in 1966.

== Description ==
The museum is located in the city's town hall.

Most of the museum's collection comes from the Roman period (mosaics, glass, pottery, coins). Artefacts on display are from the sites of Thenae, Taparura, Louza and Mahres. It also holds the country largest collection of blown glass.

== Collection ==
- Double-tomb mosaic for C. Julius Serenus and Numitoria Saturnina from Thenae
- Mosaic pavement from a baptistery near Skhira
- Mosaic pavement of Matrona, 5th century near Skhira
- Mosaic pavement with geometric and floral decoration from the house of Dionysus, 3rd century near Thenae

== See also ==
- African archaeology
- Culture of Tunisia
- List of museums in Tunisia
