= Bulla Regia Museum =

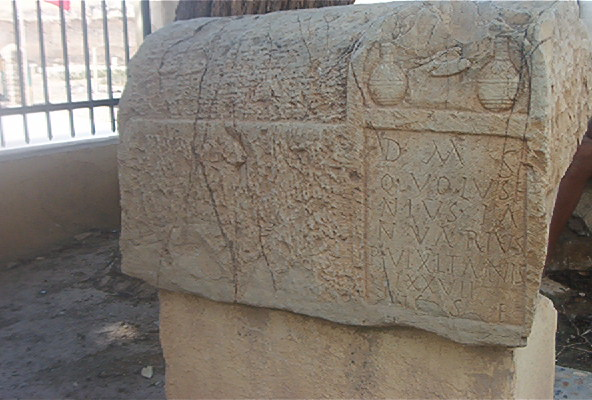
- Location: Bulla Regia, Tunisia
- Coordinates: 36°33′32″N 8°45′25″E
- Type: archaeological museum

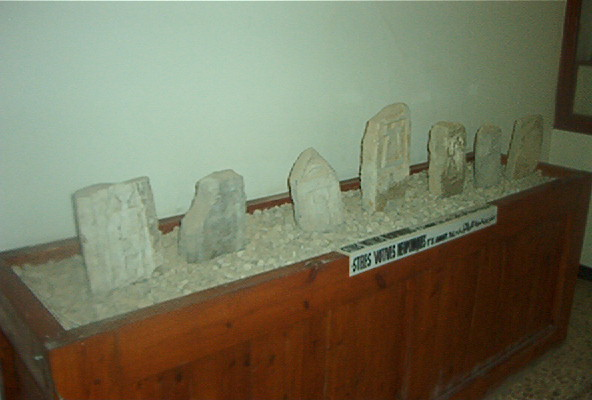

The Bulla Regia Museum is an archaeological museum in Bulla Regia, Tunisia.

North-western Tunisia is home to the archaeological site Bulla Regia. The location is renowned for its semi-subterranean houses from the Hadrianic era. Many of the mosaic floors are still in their original locations, and you can see others at the Bardo Museum in Tunis. The location is also connected to a tiny museum.

== See also ==
- Culture of Tunisia
- List of museums in Tunisia
