= Chemtou Museum =

Coordinates: 36°29′23″N 8°34′37″E

- متحف شمتو الاثري
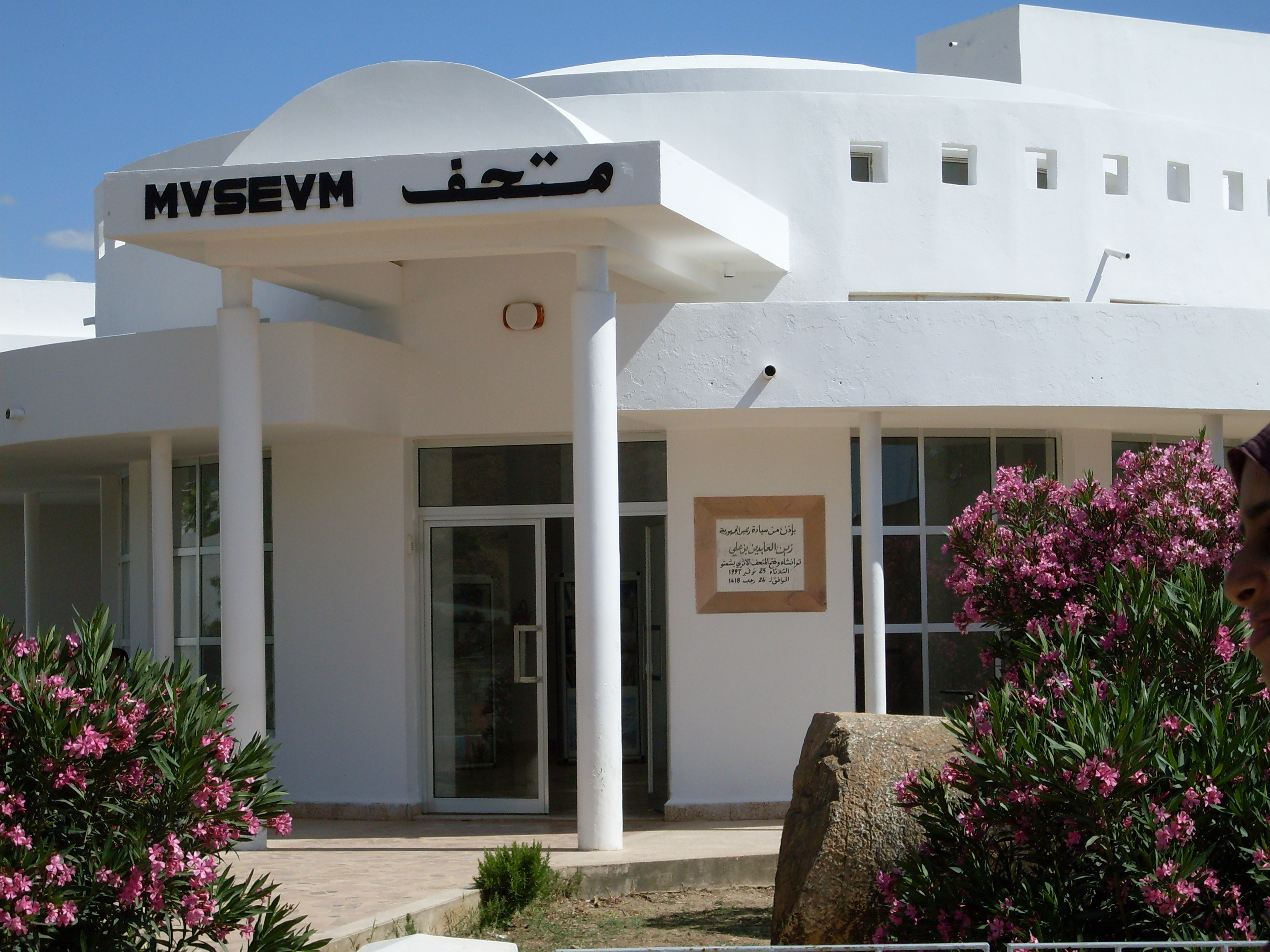
- Chemtou Museum entrance
- Location: Chemtou, Tunisia
- Type: archaeological museum
- Collection size: Numidian items
- Website: Official website

The Chemtou Museum (Arabic: المتحف الأثري بشمتو; French: Musée de Chemtou) is an archaeological museum located in Chemtou, Tunisia. The museum was designed by archaeologists with the Tunisian National Heritage Institute and the German Archaeological Institute with offices located in Rome, Italy. It has the distinction of being located in the area of the old Roman city of Simmithu, near the entrepot's marble quarry in what was the ancient Berber kingdom of Numidia.

== Marble quarries ==
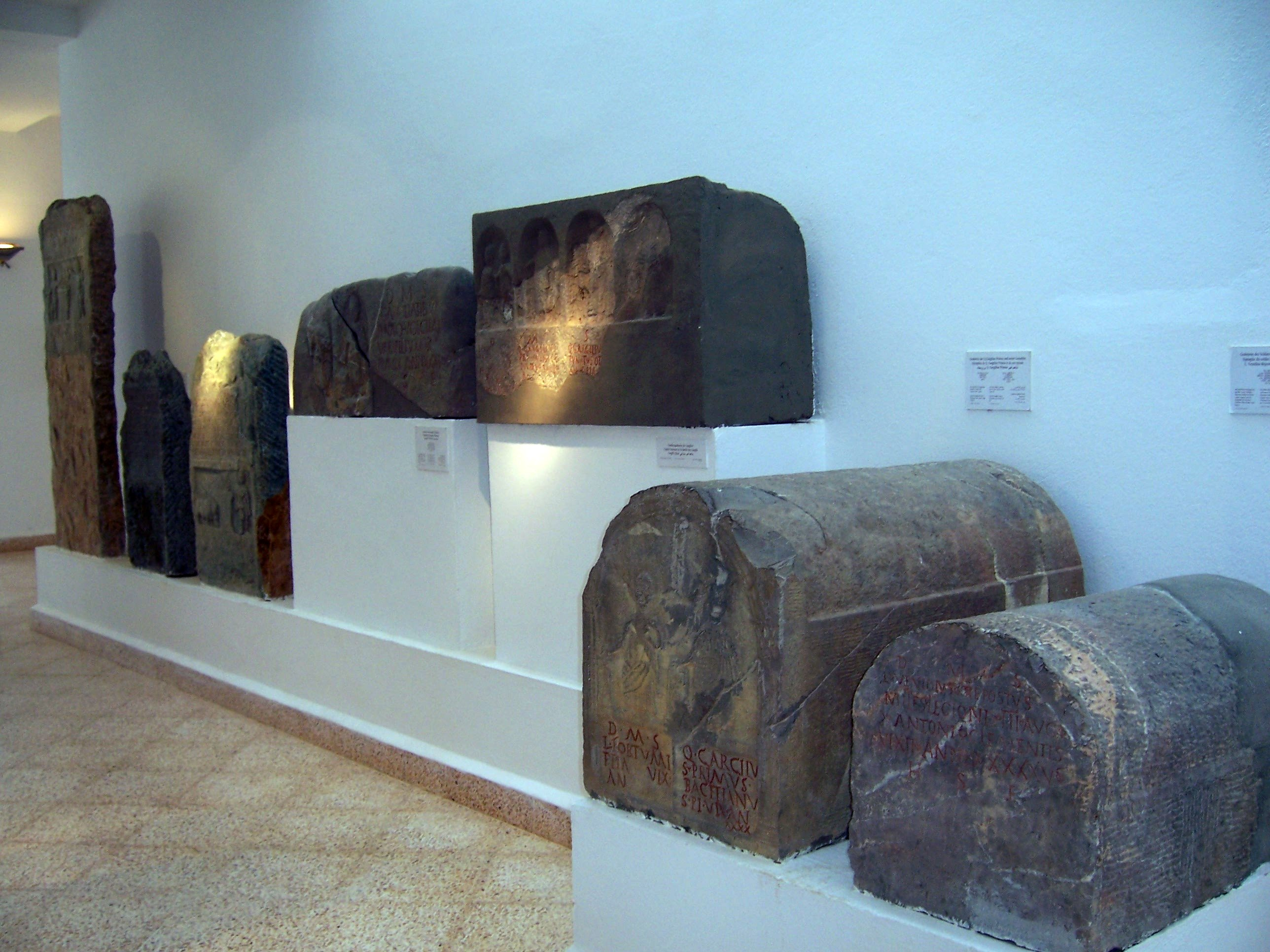
Funerary stelae at the Chemtou Museum

A series of Roman mill races to horizontal water turbines have also been discovered. This indicates that technologically, part of the activities at the site had been mechanised.

== See also ==
- Culture of Tunisia
- List of archaeological sites by country
- List of museums in Tunisia
