= Chemtou =

Ancient Roman-Berber town in Tunisia

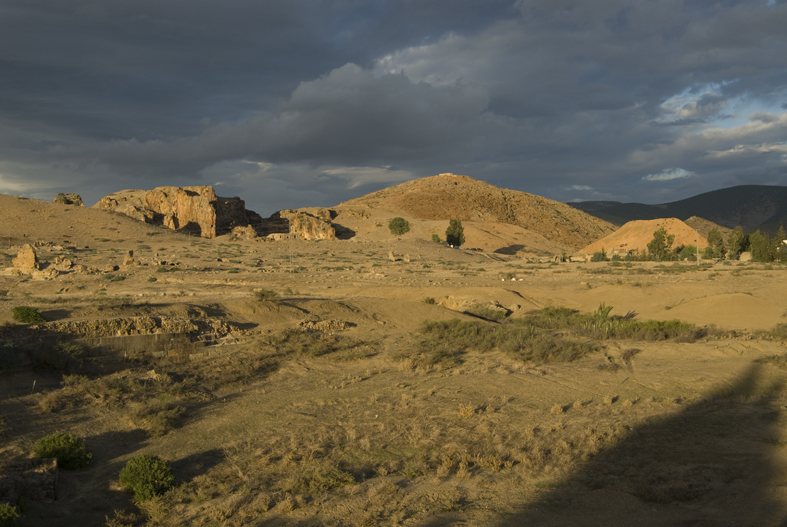
- View of Jebel Chemtou

- Location within Tunisia
- 36°29′31″N 8°34′34″E
- Location: Tunisia
- Region: Jendouba Governorate

Chemtou or Chimtou was an ancient Roman-Berber town in northwestern Tunisia, located 20 km from the city of Jendouba near the Algerian frontier. It was known as Simitthu (or Simitthus in Roman period) in antiquity.

== History ==
Chemtou was founded in the 4th to 5th century BC as a colony of the Berber kingdom of Numidia (Algeria) . It later became a Roman town in the province of Africa. The city was important enough to become a bishopric, before its eventual abandonment around the 9th to 10th century.

== Remains ==
It lies at the crossroad of two major highways: the one that connects Carthage and Hippo Regius (today Annaba), and the one that connects Thabraca (today Tabarka) and Sicca (today El Kef). The town is known for its quarries, where one of the most precious types of marbles in the Roman Empire, the antique yellow marble (marmor numidicum or giallo antico), was exploited.

With Chemtou's ruins dating from over a period of 1,500 years, the site covers over 80 hectares of area pending further excavations. After being partially excavated in the late 19th century, a series of excavations carried out since the late 1960s by a Tunisian-German archaeological team has uncovered new parts of the city, as well as the Roman road connecting it to Thabraca for the purpose of transporting marbles to the Mediterranean Sea. The excavated ruins are typical of Roman cities with temples, baths, an aqueduct, an amphitheatre, and housing for quarry workers whose number may exceed a thousand. The Chemtou Museum displays artifacts discovered in the area.

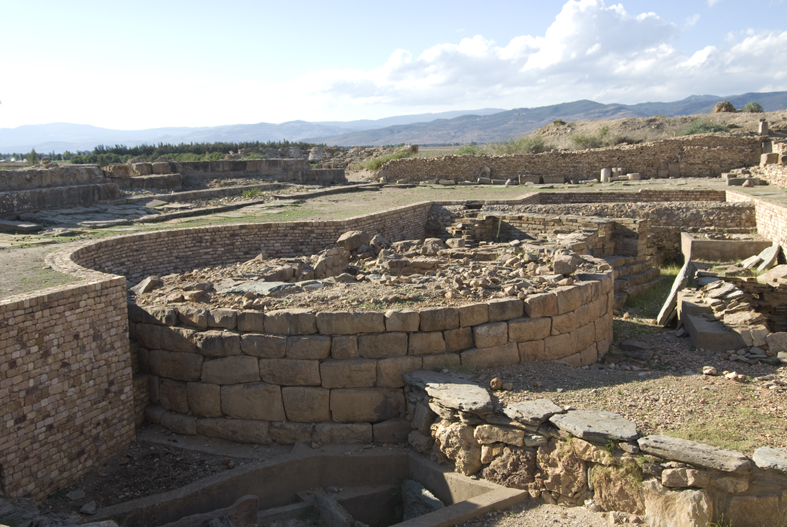
Numidic tombs under Roman forum

The testimonies of the long history of the settlement of Chimtous have been partly preserved on the rocky ridges and on their southern, western and northern slopes. In Simitthus there were all the buildings that are to be found in Roman cities: an amphitheater, a theater, a forum with forum basilica and fountain, a three- aisled market hall, a nymphaeum, at least three thermal baths. Byzantine church buildings and a building in the north-west of the city, interpreted as an imperial edifice, which is most probably a so-called Italian podium temple or temple italique. There were also two Roman sanctuaries, the temple districts of Dii Mauri on the eastern slope, and the Caelestis on the western slope at Djebel Bou Rfifa.

In addition, Simitthus also had a few buildings that stand out because of their uniqueness in the North African region:

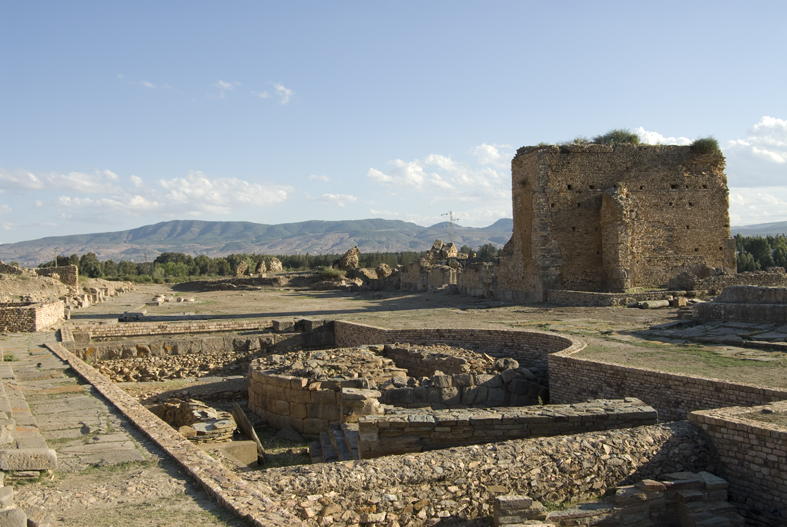
Forum

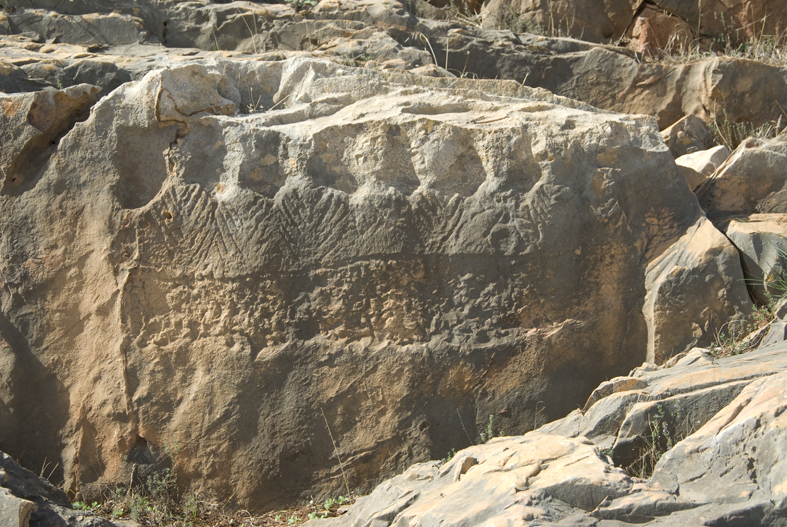
Relief of the Dii Mauri (Moorish Gods)

=== Mount Chimtou ===
On the summit of the Temple Mount / Djebel Chimtou is a Numidian shrine, which is attributed to the Numidian King Micipsa. His father Massinissa, who had been an Allied Roman since the Second Punic War, had seized power over the upper Medjerda valley in 152 BC. After his death, his son and successor, Micipsa, founded a ten-meter monumental monument on the highest point of the mountain in the late 2nd century BC. The marble was used as a building material, which at the same time meant the discovery of the "marmor numidicum". The ground plan of the sanctuary is a rectangle of about twelve to five and a half meters in length and width. It was erected on the planted rocky base, the crevices and bumps of which had been closed with strings. The building consisted of solid marble squares, connected with dowels, and had no interior. Only a few blocks of the foundations have been preserved in situ.

The monument consisted of a high substructure, which was orientated towards the east to the rising sun. On its east long side a shining door was attached, which was led by a three-step base. On the substructure was a second storey, which was designed as a Doric column pavilion. The building was decorated with rich decorations, including a trophy relief. The fragments of the building decoration are among the most valuable examples of the very rarely preserved Numidian royal architecture and can be visited today in the Chimtou Museum to reconstruct the sanctuary.

In Roman times, the Shrine was used as a sacred temple dedicated to the god Saturn. It was expanded in the late 2nd century AD by various additions. In the 4th century AD it was finally replaced by a small, three-aisled church, using the quader and architectural parts of the destroyed sanctuary.

=== Rock-reliefs ===
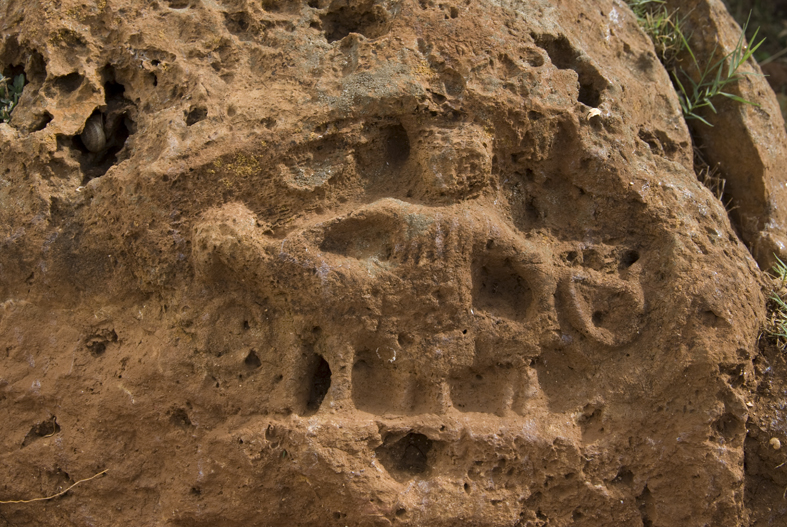
Chimtou, Saturn relief

At the end of the 1960s, the largest known series of Roman rock reliefs in North Africa was discovered at Tempelberg. Altogether there are about 200 pieces. They are sculpted out of the rock in the southwest, west, and north of the Temple Mount, heavily weathered and visible only with oblique incident light. The reliefs usually form the same: the consecrated ones, an altar, a sacrificial animal, which, if recognizable, is always a ram. The devotee is often depicted on the sacrificial horse, with the attributes rhombus and wreath. Although no inscriptions were found, the typology points to the god Saturn. His consecrated reliefs form one of the greatest monuments in North Africa. The reliefs are arranged in groups and are, if possible, on natural rock banks. Often, there was a niche in front of it, where dedications could be given. In one case, shards of several vessels and a clay lamp were discovered.

=== Roman bridge over the Medjerda ===
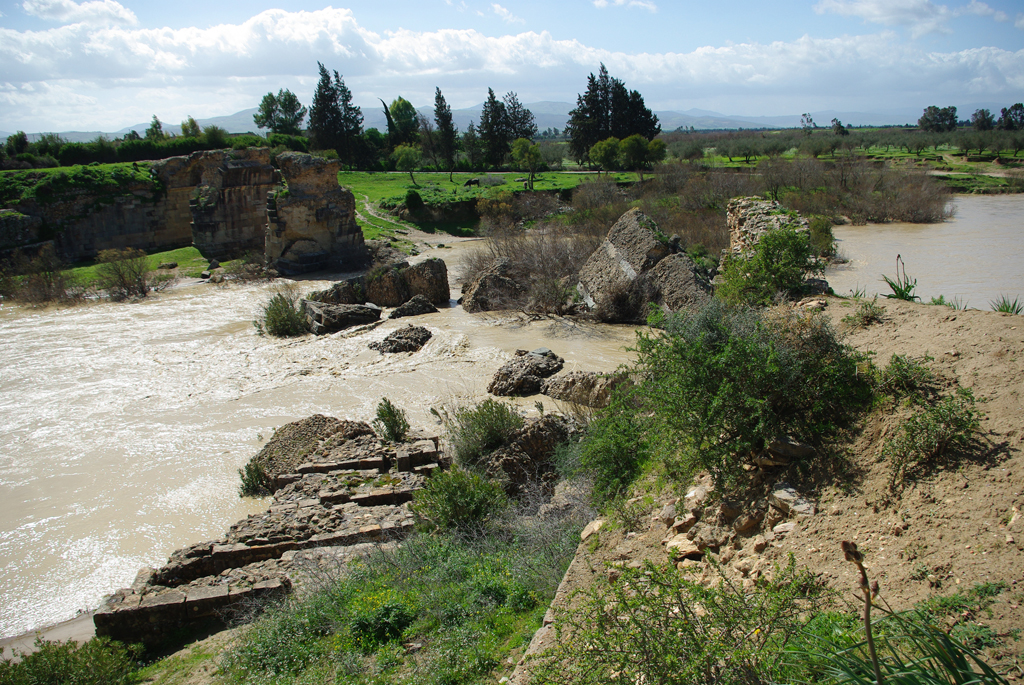
Ruins of the Roman bridge

The Roman bridge over the Medjerda is considered to be one of the largest Roman bridges in North Africa and has an outstanding importance from an architectural and engineering perspective. It led the Roman road between Thuburnica and Sicca Veneria across the Medjerda near Simitthus. In the swampland of the highly meandering river, the difficult foundations and the recurring floods made the construction a risky undertaking. In the 1st century AD the first attempt was made to build bridges, but this first bridge did not extend beyond the century. In 112 AD, a new building was erected by Trajan, as can be found in an inscription (now in the Chimtou Museum). The river was temporarily diverted to build the bridge. A 30 meter wide and 1.5 meter thick foundation slab made of wooden crates filled with a lime-mortar-stone mixture (Caementicium) was placed on the river bed. Their top was secured with a covering of stone blocks. This construction, was heavily stressed by the strongly changing water flow and was therefore strengthened later. However, the fortifications could not stop the plateau from being submerged, which eventually led to the collapse of the bridge in the 4th century. Since then the remains of the building form an impressive rubble field.

The bridge had three arch openings, only one of which served as a water passage so that it was a dam at the same time. Only the southernmost bridge pillar still stands in its original position. The material used for the cuboids was green limestone from Bordj Helal, gray marble /limestone from Ain El Ksir and yellow stone blocks of unknown origin

=== Turbine mill ===
About a century after the inauguration of the bridge, a grain mill was installed on the left bank of the river. It is one of only two Roman turbine mills known in North Africa (the second is in Testour). It was a rectangular parallelepipedal building in the protection of the high bridgehead. The wooden turbines had horizontally mounted paddle wheels, three millstones were attached directly to the turbine axles. The construction, previously unknown from antiquity, worked in a refined way: if the river level and the flow velocity in summer were too low to propel the mill wheels, the water was first stowed in a controllable mill pond. Afterwards, it was passed into mills, which narrowed and accelerated like nozzles, so that the mill worked all year round. When the bridge collapsed in the first half of the 4th century AD, the mills' building was also destroyed and the mills pocketed, so that the facility was no longer functional.

=== Working camp ===
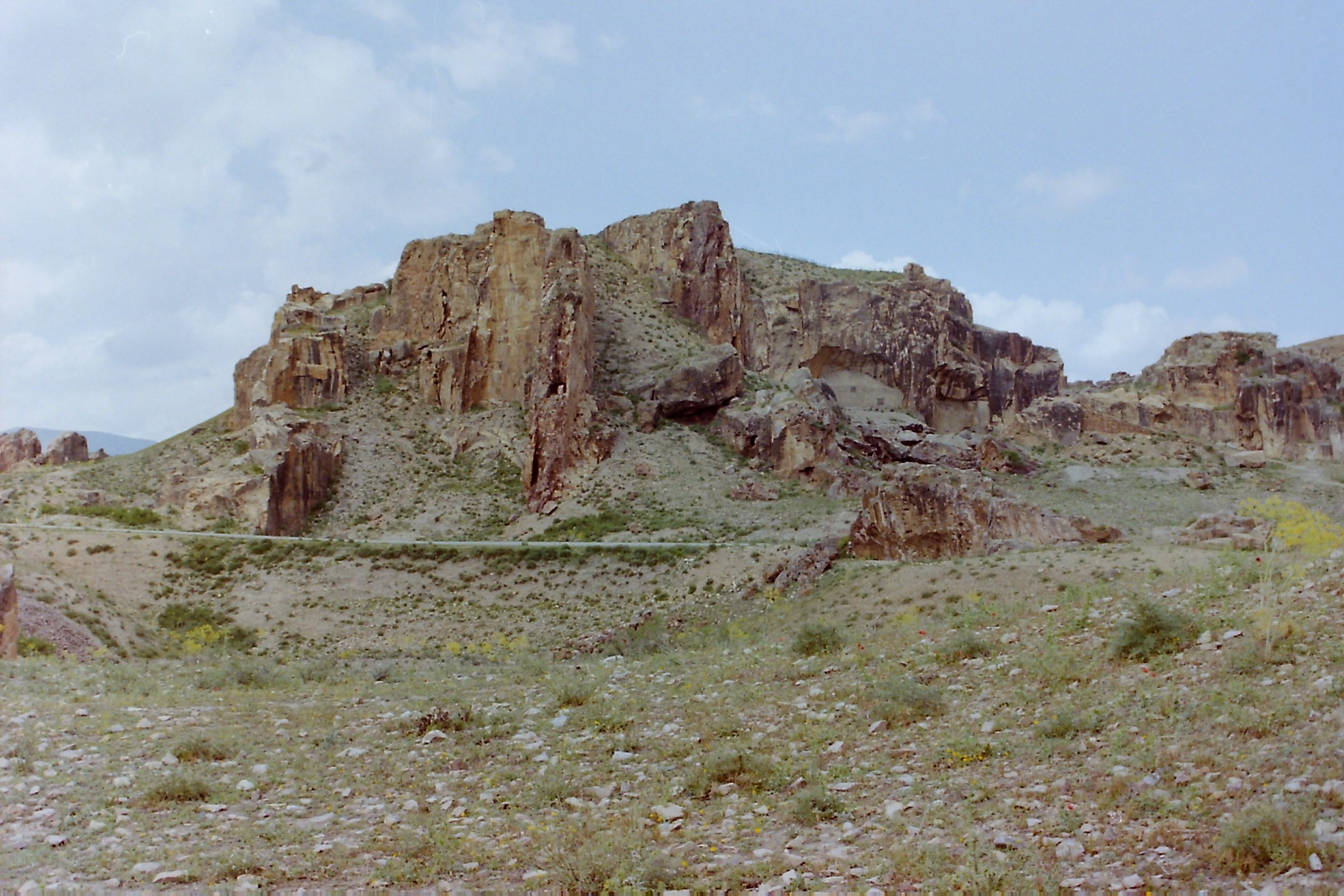
Chemtou marble quarry

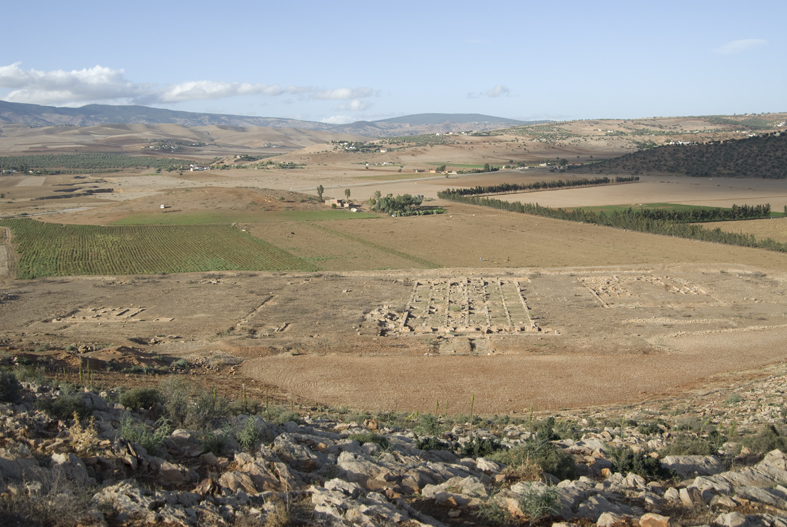
Chimtou, Roman working camp

A work, residential and administrative warehouse was necessary for the centrally organized marble demolition, built on an area of over 40,000 square meters on the northern edge of the quarry, 800 meters from the Roman city. In the huge warehouse area, there was a cemetery for the campers (the urban necropolis was located on the southern slope of the Djebel Chemtou), which housed stalls, workshops, bathhouses, sanctuaries, water distributors and, just in front of the 300-meter-long south wall. This often involved judges who were condemned to the quarries, e.g. Christians persecuted after the turn of the century (including women). They were buried in simple Steingrräberiden with modest grave mounds. The storage area was surrounded by a high, heavy wall, with only two gate entrances so far. Although the work camp was so hermetically separated from the city, it took advantage of it: chiefs of the quarries donated the town public buildings, but not of marble blocks, which were too expensive and destined for export. The largest building in the camp was a factory site or fabrica, more than 3,000 square meters, which was demarcated by the camp itself through heavy walls. It was divided into six elongated workshop axes, which could only be entered individually through six lockable gates and were not connected together. More than 5000 stone objects of different kinds were found here, which testify to a regular mass production: besides plates and blocks of marble blanks, plates, pots, marquetry, mortars, pestles, relief plates and statuettes were produced here for everyday use as well as for export. Some of the ground shells had walls of only 2 millimeters in thickness. The complex was built in the penultimate third of the 2nd century AD, and was not built until the turn of the century with its own water supply system inside. Already around the middle of the 3rd century, however, an earthquake vault and flat roofs of the multi-nave system collapsed. Thereupon the Fabrica was only repaired in parts, and remained under obscure conditions until the end of the century. It is probable that the workers in this last phase were no longer living in the camp, as no new graves were being built at the camp cemetery. In the fourth century the warehouses were systematically plundered for building material and finally the camp was completely planned.

=== Cisterns and Aqueducts ===
As in every Roman city, there was an urban aqueduct in Simitthus, from which public and private baths, drinking water fountains, and vatoes were fed. In Simitthus, however, in contrast to other Roman cities, there was an increased demand for water, since not only the residential city had to be supplied with fresh spring water on a regular basis, but also the quarries. In the quarrying plant, in the working camp and in the Fabrica it was used for sawing, grinding, and forging of tools, and as drinking water for the workers. Therefore, Simitthus had an unusually complex aqueduct: the water was transported to the city over a distance of over 30 kilometers with bridges, piers and underground canals. There it was headed into a "Castellum divisorum", located almost 2 kilometers outside the city. This is a huge domed seven-aisled water storage and distribution system with large window openings for ventilation. Here more than 10,000 cubic meters of water could be stored and distributed as required. The aqueduct led to the north wall, and on the slope side in the east, adjustable lines led southwards to the city and the quarries.

== Ecclesiastical history ==
The Bishopric was founded during the Roman Empire and survived through the arian Vandal and Orthodox Byzantine empires, only ceasing to function with the Muslim conquest of the Maghreb.

The diocese was refounded in name at least in the 1930s. The bishopric of Simitthu, no longer a residential see, is included in the Catholic Church's list of titular sees. The current holder of this office is Joseph Ha, also Auxiliary Bishop of Hong Kong.

== Gallery ==
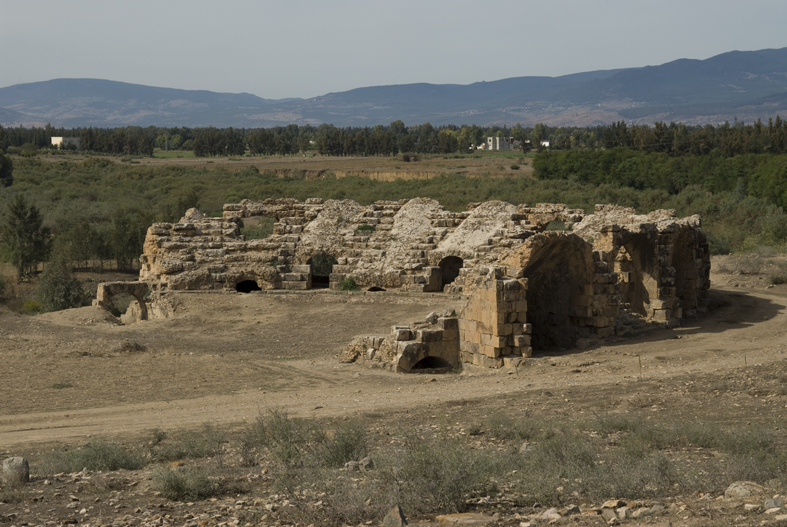
Roman theatre

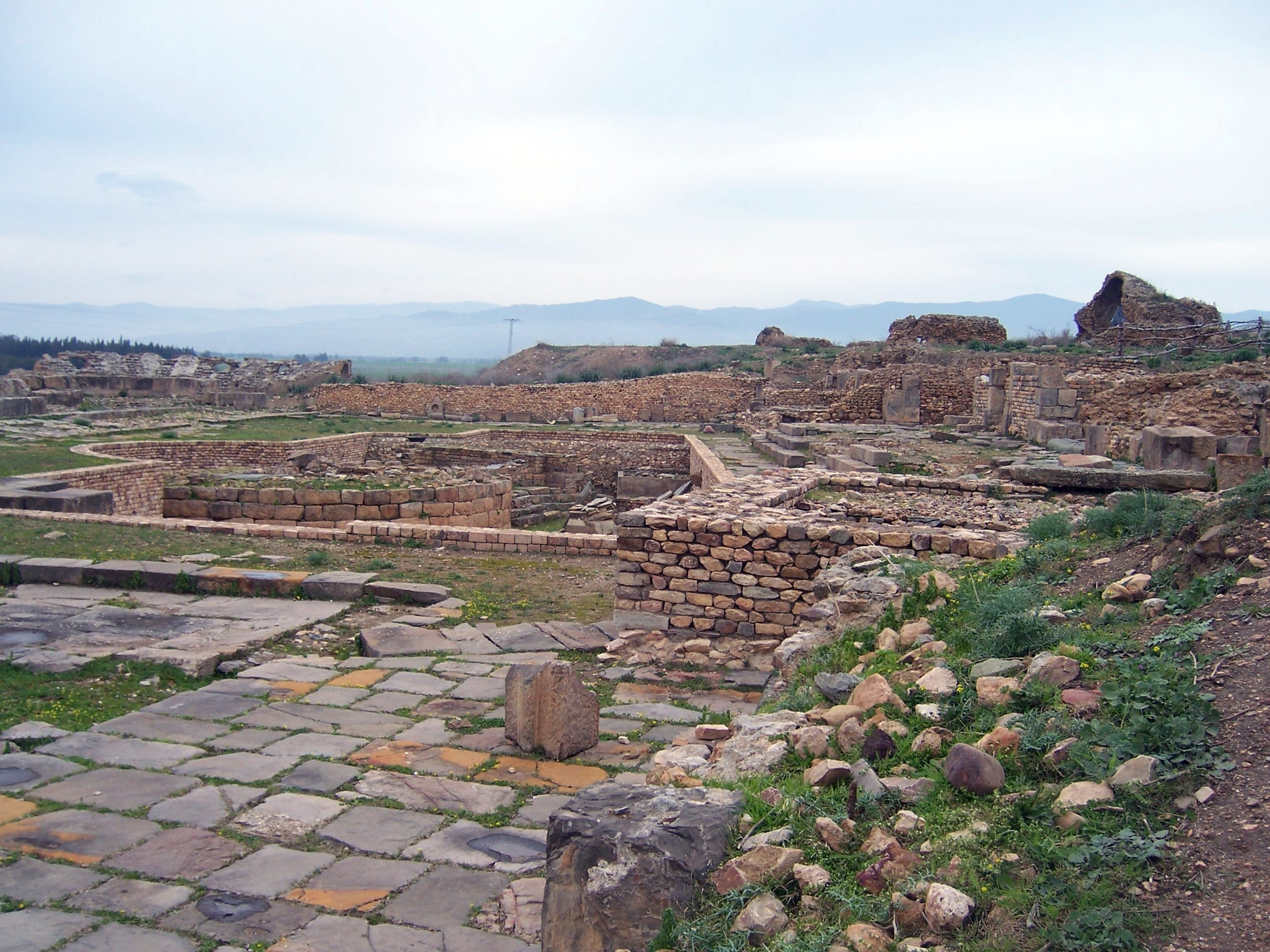
Roman forum

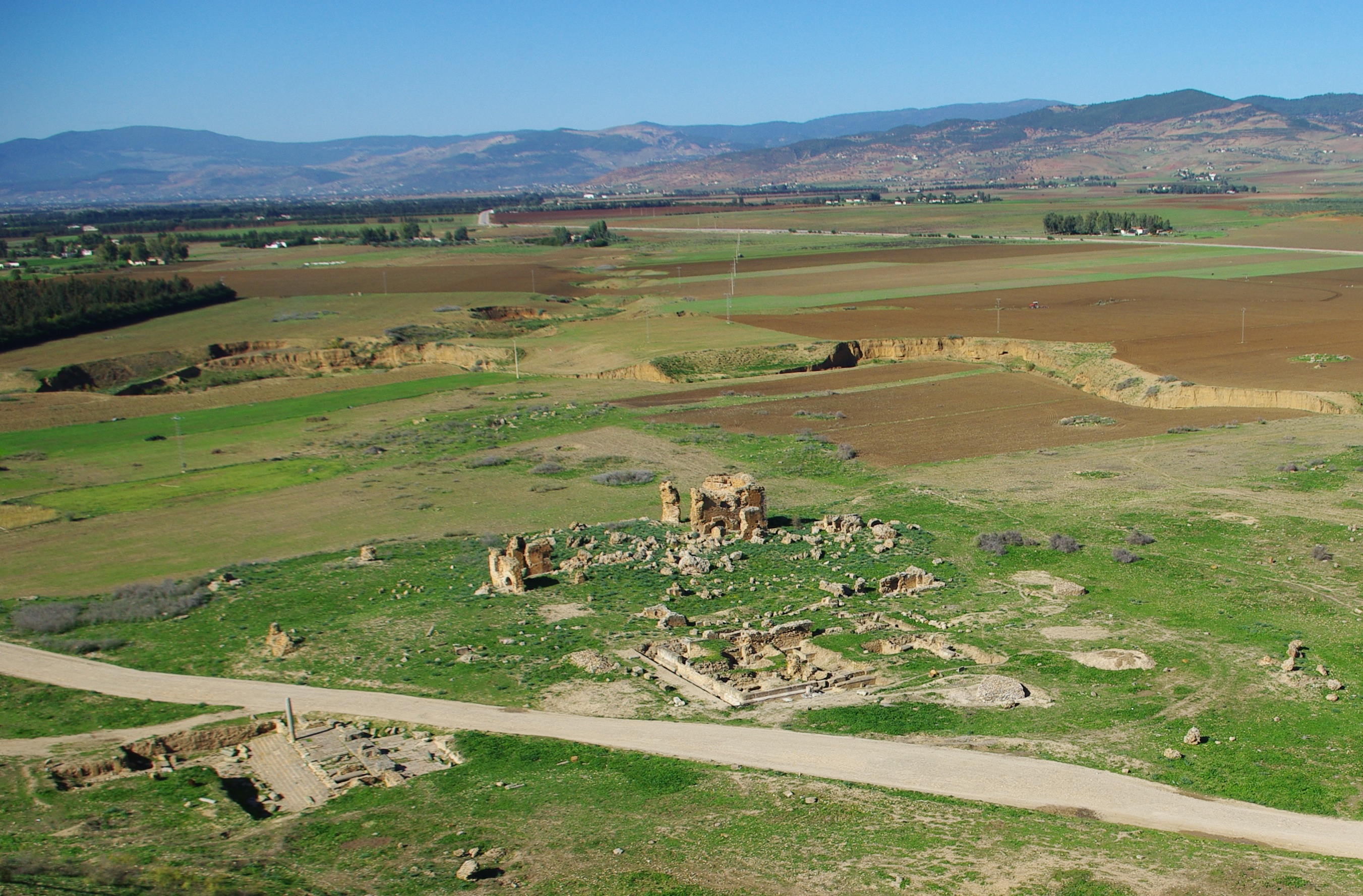
Building dedicated to Imperial cult

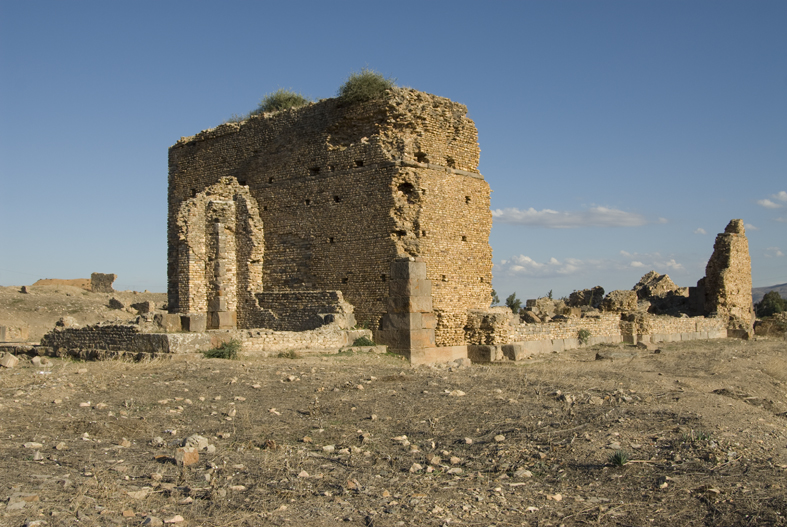
Roman basilica near the forum

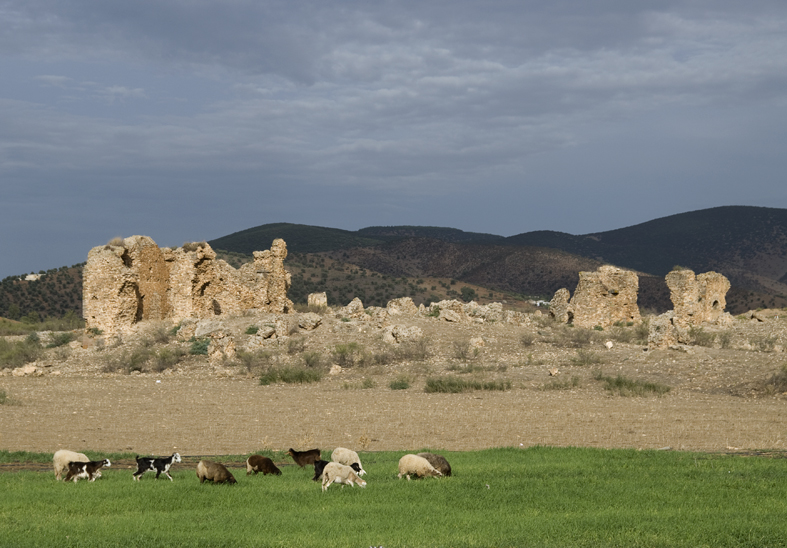
Roman baths
