= Nyaung-gan =

Archaeological site in Myanmar

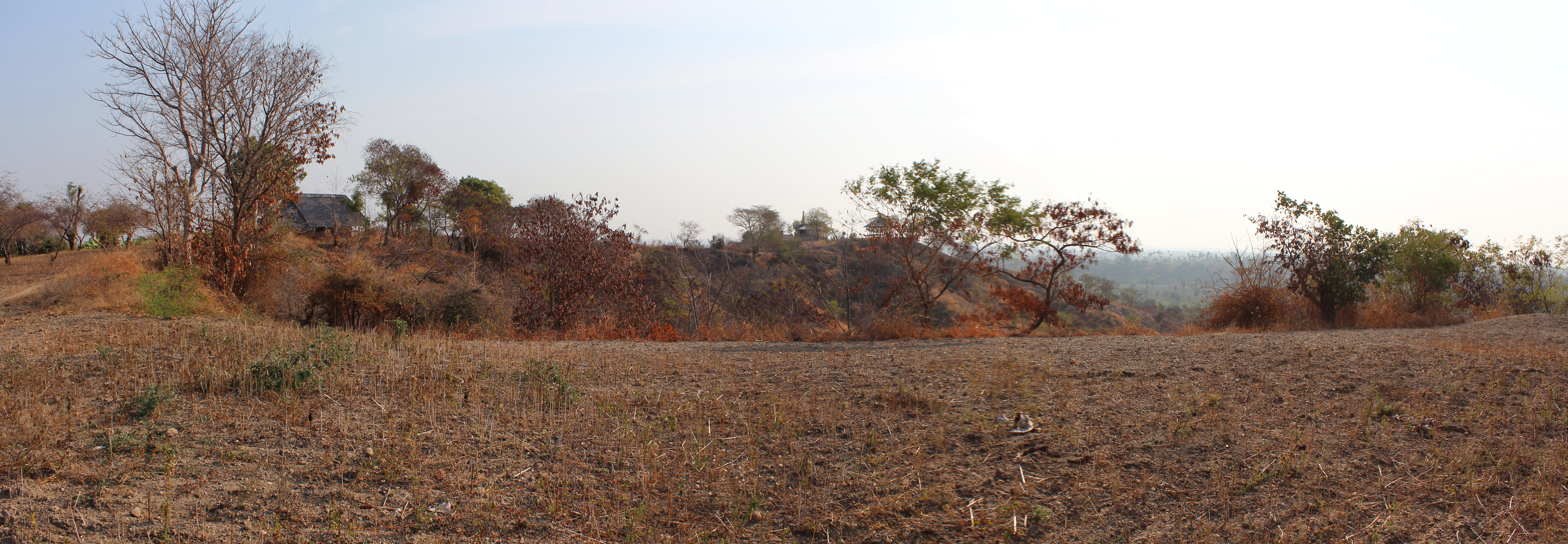
Surrounding Area from the site

Nyaung-gan is a Bronze Age cemetery in central Myanmar, and was the first site in Myanmar to have artefacts dating to the Bronze Age. Burials found over two seasons (1998–1999) were found to have grave goods consisting of pottery filled with animal bones, beads, spear points, terracotta and jewelry, no iron was found at the site and that provides a good benchmark to start with dating of the site. The site was initially thought to be a significant site due to surface findings, so a team was assembled to investigate the validity of that claim. Myanmar is centrally located along trade routes that connect South, East, and Southeast Asia, and has great potential to show cultural influence from all stops along those trade routes. Another unique aspect of the site is that the skeletons found in the burials were left in situ, and a museum was constructed around them.

.

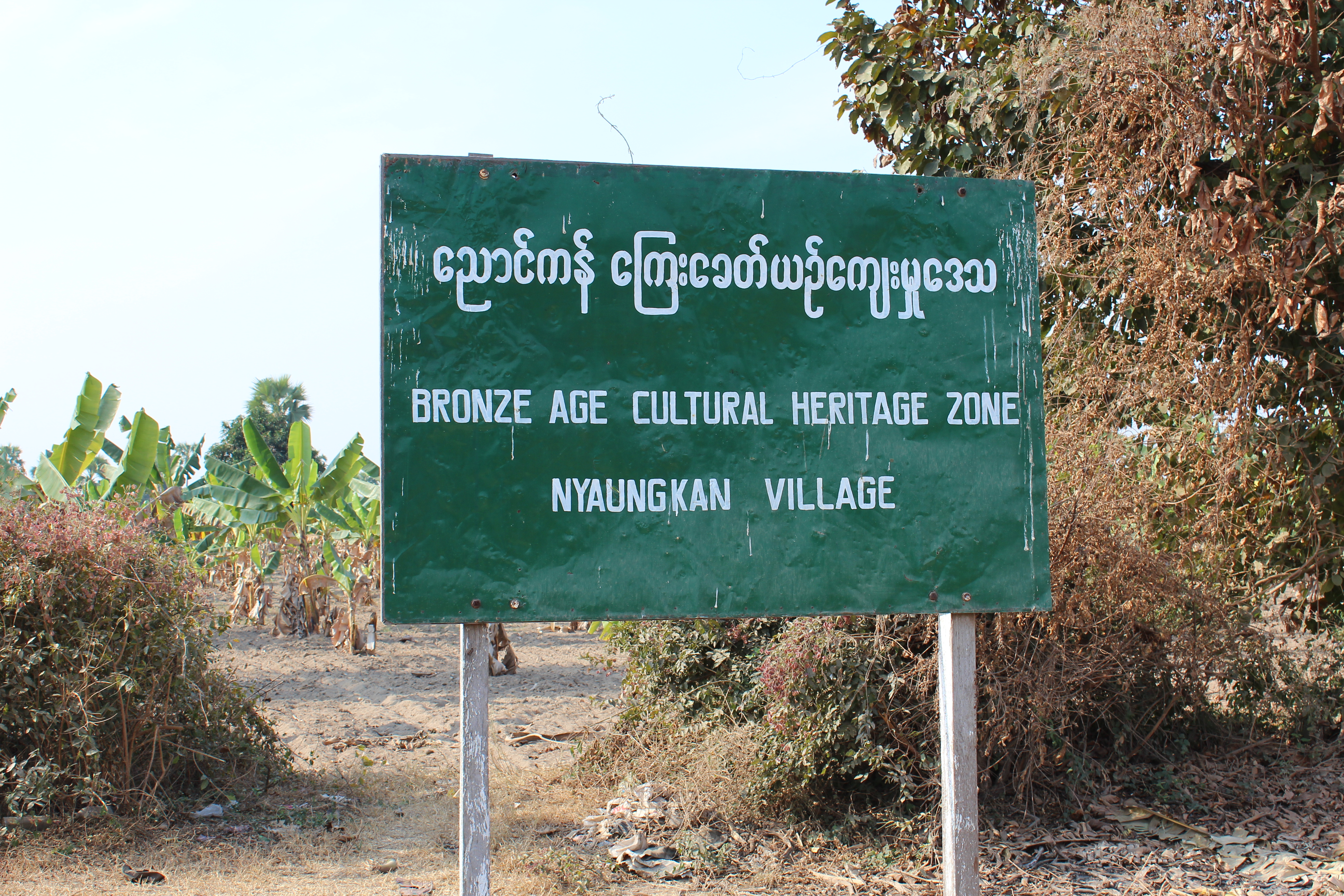
Sign outside the site

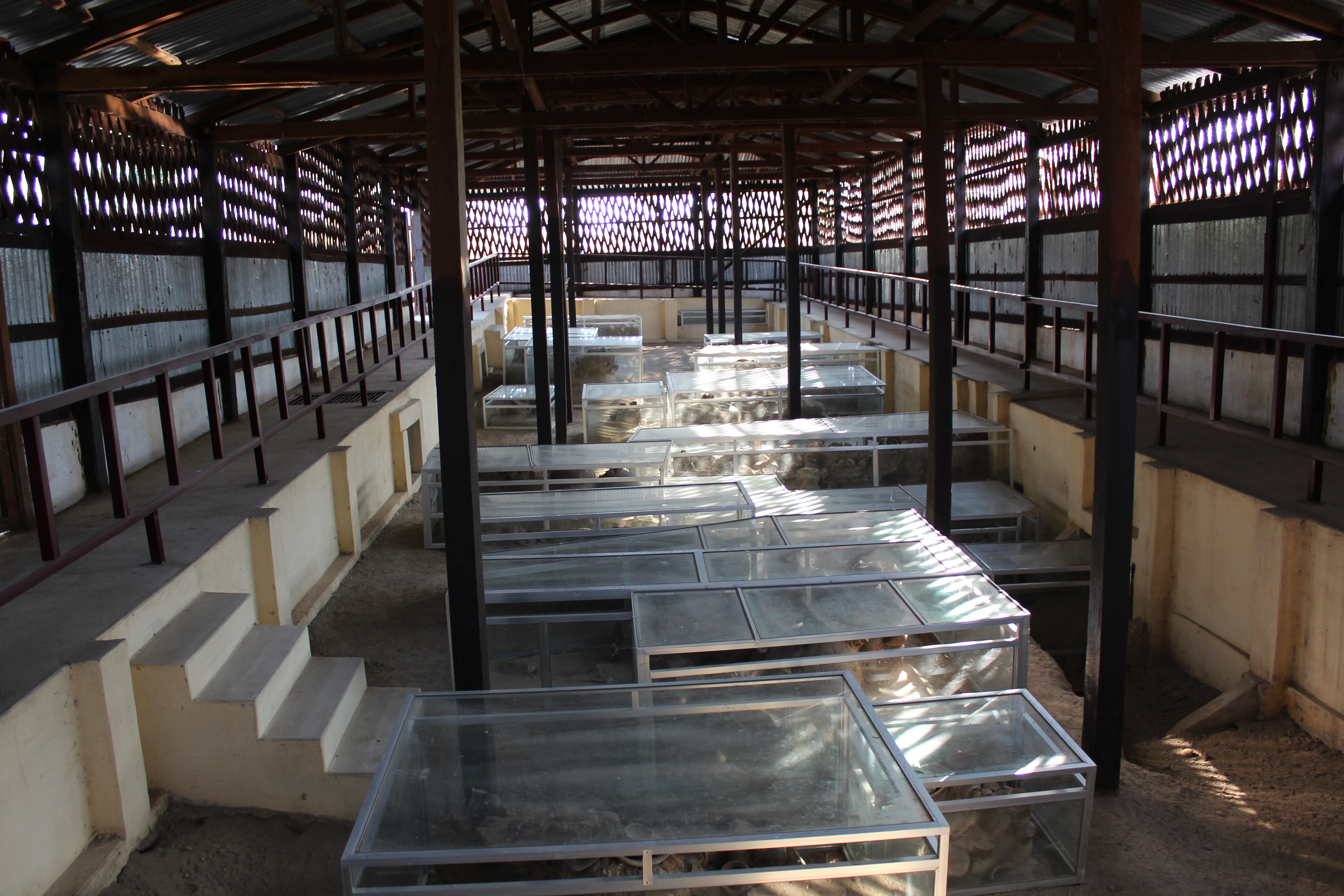
Image of the interior of the Nyaung'gan site museum showing burials in cases.

== Location details and site museum ==
The ancient cemetery is located south of Nyaung-gan village in central Myanmar, 120 km northwest of Mandalay, the country's 2nd largest city. Located in the Chindwin valley, the cemetery is located close to the rim of a volcano near the modern town of Monywa. The cemetery has an area of 75 m by 180 m (13,500 m^{2}) and sits at an elevation of 107 m.

== Exchange networks ==
Myanmar had a vast amount of mineral and cultural resources which played an integral role in long distance exchange networks connecting China, India and other nearby areas.

Major neighboring cities include Naypyidaw, Yangon, and Mandalay.

== Burials and grave goods ==
=== Burials ===
During both seasons of field work, the team discovered 43 burials, many were accompanied by pottery of many shapes and sizes. The burials were situated in a way that they did not disturb previous burials. A majority of the burials were aligned with the head pointing north, with a few exceptions where they were buried pointing south. Of the 43 individuals found 36 were adults and seven were infants or children. Noting that this is a small sample size, these individuals led healthier lives than other southeast Asian prehistoric peoples, as evidence by their larger mandibles and one larger skull. One interesting finding was that the women teeth seemed to have much more worn down anterior teeth in comparison to the men.

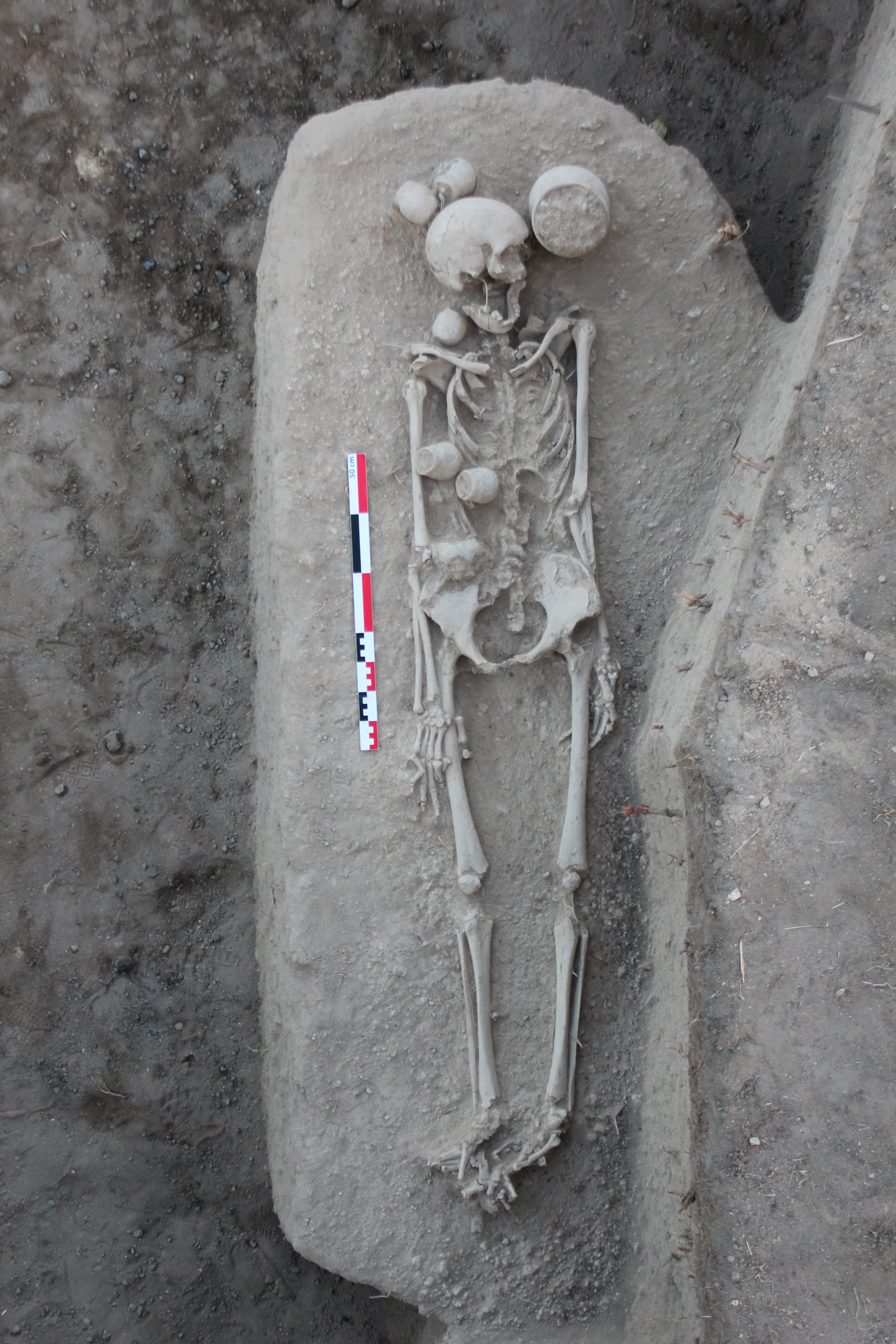
Burial 4

=== Mission Archéologique Française au Myanmar ===
This excavation project, taking place in 2006, was a collaboration between the French National Centre for Scientific Research and the Mandalay Department of Archaeology of the Ministry of Culture.

This excavation consisted of three sites, Htan Ta Pin, Kokkokhahla, and Mon Htoo in hopes to understand more about the exchange network within Myanmar and Nyaung-gan.

==== Htan Ta Pin ====
Situated in Pyawbwe Township, in which 36 Iron Age graves with 23 extant burials, 17 adults and six children were found during the excavation in the 41 square metres (440 sq ft) of ground uncovered. Thirteen of the burials had associated grave goods of pottery, stone and glass beads and polished stone tools, but no metal artefacts were excavated. Researchers believe this is due to unauthorized excavations taking place prior to them showing up.

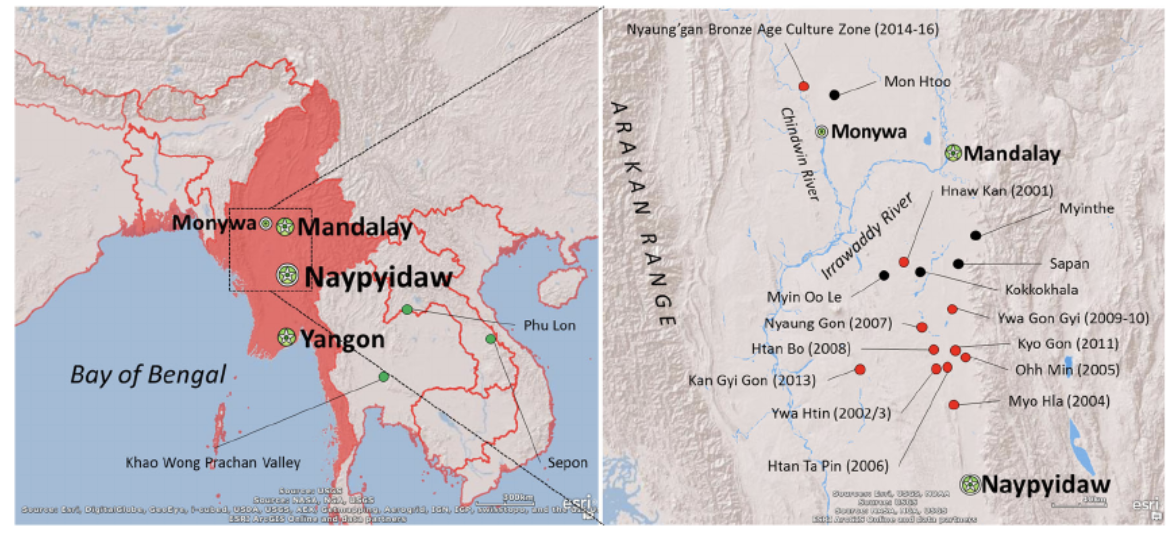
Map showing Myanmar’s location in Southeast Asia

==== Kokkokhahla ====
Situated in Wundwin township, in which 85 burials oriented north or northeast were discovered, in association with grave goods of stone and ceramic beads, pottery, iron/steel tools and copper-base alloys, including 2 spearheads, 2 axes, 3 bracelet fragments and 16 bundles of wire. This assemblage would suggest an Iron Age date, post c. 500 BC, but no radiocarbon determinations are available.

==== Mon Htoo ====
Situated in Budalin township, in which 37 burials were exposed, all but one of which was oriented N/S, in association with stone bracelets and beads, ceramics, bivalve shells and 15 copper-base artifacts (ten axes, two rings, one spear, one bell and one bracelet). A Bronze Age date was attributed based on the style of the assemblage and the absence of iron and glass.

=== Grave goods ===
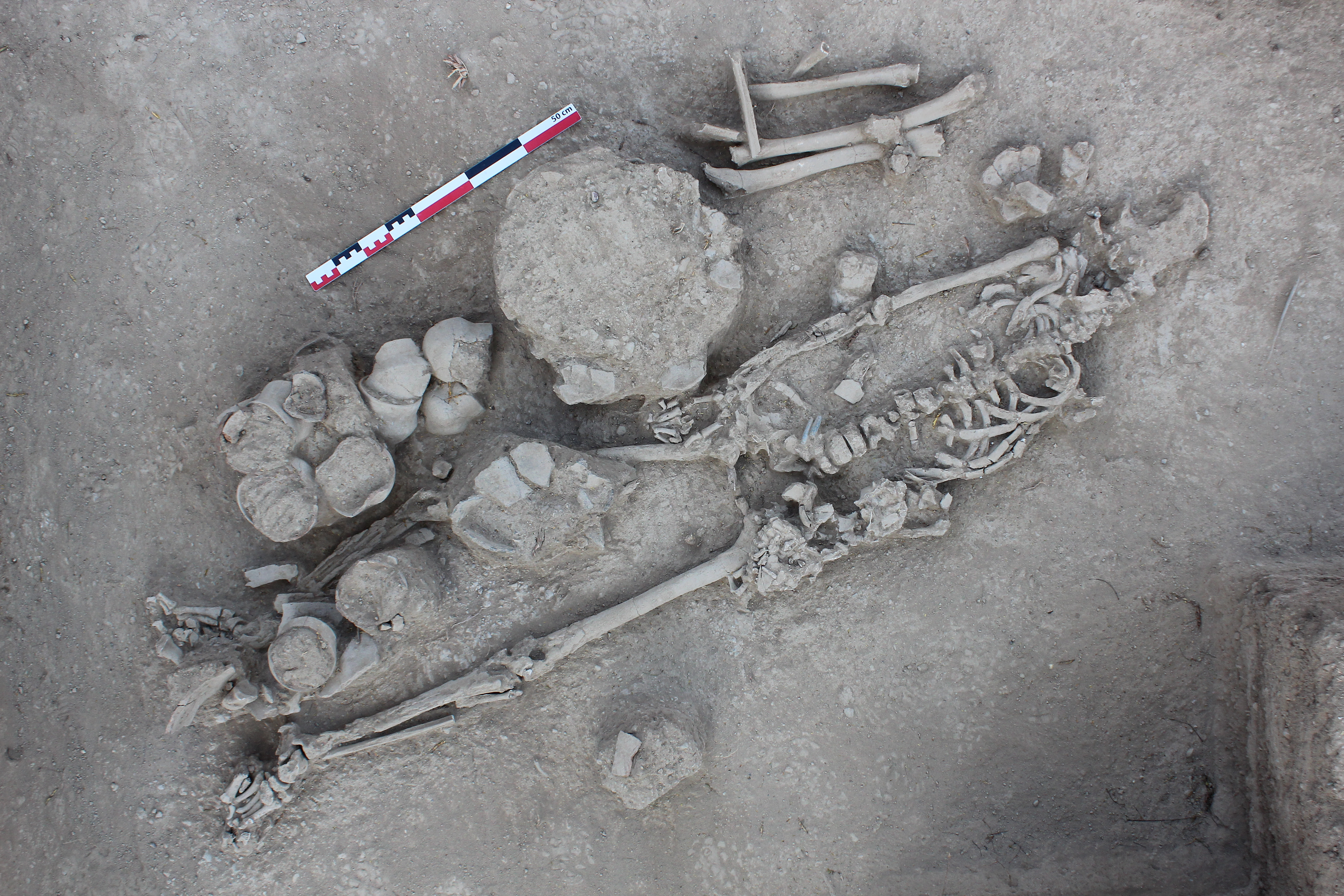
A burial with grave goods present in pottery.

Grave goods were found with many of the burials and contained a wide variety of pots, ranging from a diameter of 4 cm to 55 cm, and held a multitude of items. Items that were collected at this site include bronze tools, both animal and human bones, pottery and stone tools. These items were collected from four excavation pits (SE, M, NW, NE), and pit SE was where almost exclusively where bronze tools were located. A majority of the bronze artifacts were either axes or spear points, and no jewelry made of bronze.
