= Archaeology museum =

Type of museum

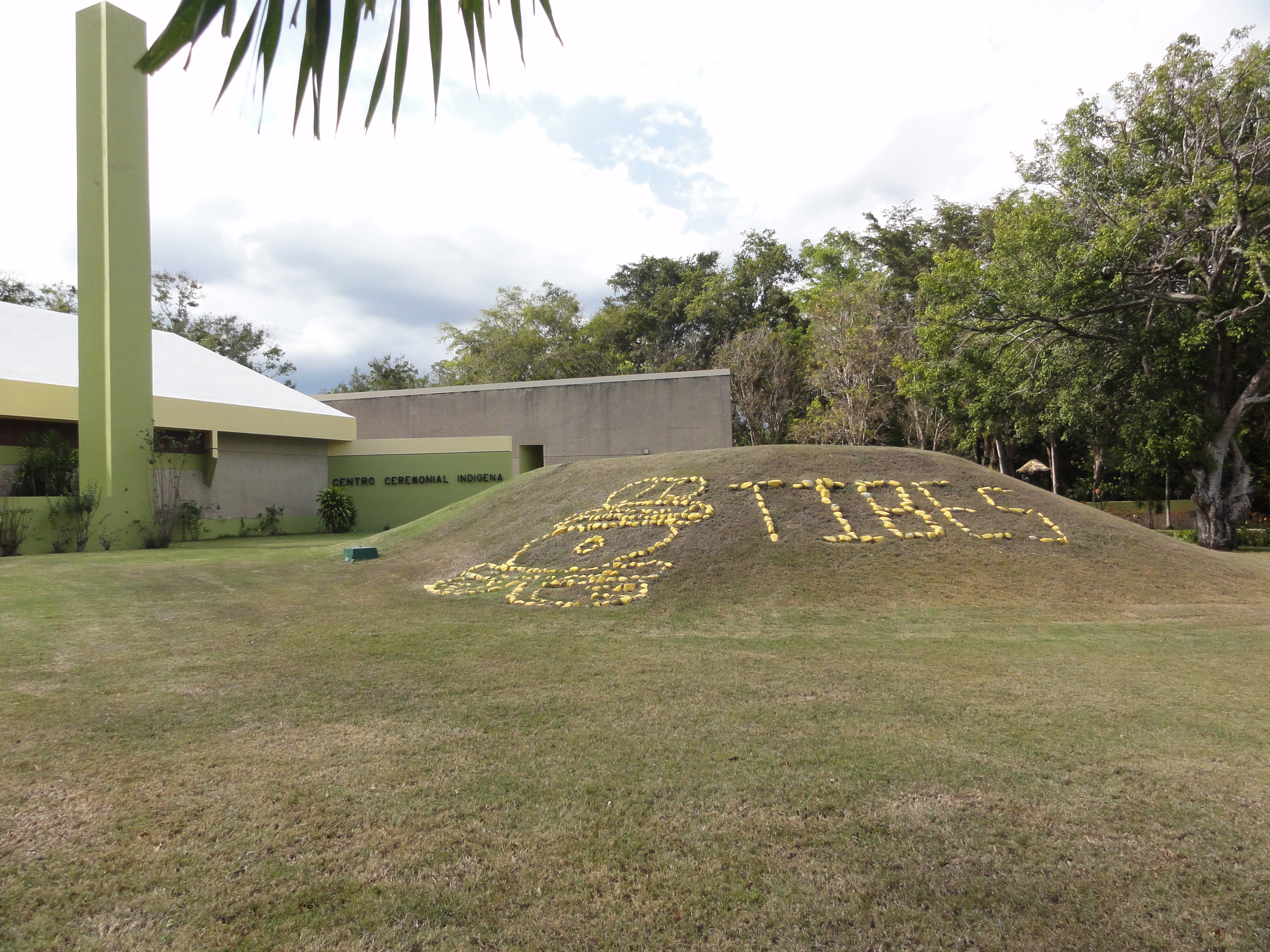
The archaeology museum at Tibes Indigenous Ceremonial Center in Ponce, Puerto Rico, displays archaeological artifacts dating over two millennia.

An archaeology museum is a museum that specializes in the display of archaeological artifacts.

Many archaeology museum are in the open air, such as the Ancient Agora of Athens and the Roman Forum. Others display artifacts inside buildings, such as National Museum of Beirut and Cairo's Museum of Egyptian Antiquities. Some display artifacts both outside and inside, such as the Tibes Indigenous Ceremonial Center.

Some archaeology museums, such as the Western Australian Museum, may also exhibit maritime archaeological materials. These appear in its Shipwreck Galleries, a wing of the Maritime Museum. This last museum has also developed a 'museum-without-walls' through a series of underwater wreck trails.

An outside museum was erected at an active archaeological dig site in Nyaung-gan cemetery in Myanmar.

== See also ==
- Open-air museum
- List of museums
- Types of museums
- Museum of Archaeology and History of Le Mans
