= Harir Mountain =

Mountain in Dhale, Yemen

Highest point
- Elevation: 7,800 ft (2,400 m)
- Coordinates: 13°44′41″N 44°51′52″E

Geography
- Location: Dhale Yemen

Harir Mountain is located in Yemen, and is one of the largest mountains in Dhale Governorate. The name of Harir Mountain is mentioned in Al-Hamdani's "Description of the Arabian Peninsula" book. Also in "The History of Yemeni Tribes" by Hamza Ali Luqman. Also mentioned by many Yemeni and Arab historians and writers, as well as in history and geography school textbooks. Harir Mountain is located in the east of Dhale governorate and within the administrative division of Al Hussein District. It's 20 kilometers from Dhale, and it is a mountain range that extends from Naqil (Al-Maadi) to the south, until Zahert Al-Atry to the north. Small mountains, rocky outcrops, valleys, and reefs branch off from it, as well as deep abysses to the west and east. The mountain range ends at Al-Hamayer and Al-Hasswa and Seelat Ghafinah in Shaka Valley near Aqram Mountain and at Lakmat El-Nub, Seelat Hamam, and EL-Haza to the west. And the village of Adina Wahid Ali which overlooks Murat Valley and Adina to the east. Harir Mountain is bordered from the south and east by Halimayn District. And from the north is the Shuaib district, and to the west is Shaka, Khella, Al-Hussein, and Al-Sha'ari land. Its altitude is 7800 feet above sea level. At the top of the mountain, there is a flat area on which villages have been built and residences have been constructed, interspersed with valleys and green agricultural terraces.

== Al-Fuqaha Village ==
At the highest peak of Harir Mountain is the Al-Fuqaha, considered one of the largest and oldest villages on the mountain, as well as the main center of the mountain. Its buildings were constructed from hard stones. It was named after Fiqh because there were judges and legal document writers who graduated at the hands of scholars from Jableh who wrote and notarized between people. Al-Hota is an extension of the Al-Fuqaha Village, where there are some shops, where agricultural products are traded, a health center, and a high school built in 2000. At the southern end of Harir Mountain are the villages of Al-Marafda, Al-Hardud, Hegla, Al-Jous, Al-Mihra, and Al-Masnaa. Not far from these villages, in a central location to the villages of Mountain Harir, there is a unified school for boys and girls built in 1950, it is the first school built in Harir by the British known as "School".

== Northern end ==
The northern end of Harir Mountain includes the village of Adina, which is known for its cultivation of coffee and grains and its abundance of water. Arashi Village is an agricultural village with an abundance of water as well. Zahera Village which is known for its coffee cultivation. Marrat Village is known for its wide range of land and surface wells. These villages are located on the top of Harir Mountain from south to north, while the villages related to the mountain from east to west include the villages of Ghasha, Husn al-Badawi, Asiqa, Mashirah, and Mthaad. The villages from the west include Al-Maariyad, Al-Qabal, Azan, Laklamt al-Nowab, Al-Qarmah, and Ataba. The Aden port, airport, and free zone can be seen from the south side. Also from the east side, the Yafe Mountains and the Halimayn Mountains. Also, Al-Awabel Mountain and Meris Mountain, which is adjacent to Harir Mountain from the north and Jahaf Mountain from the west can be seen. The mountain is believed to be the original home of the Hariri family. As Muhammad Abdul Qadir Bamatraf points out in his book “Al-Jami’: Notable Emigrants Affiliated to Yemen and Their Tribes”: The Hariri is a tribe of the Azdi tribe, one of the largest Hauran clans, one of the governorates of the Syrian Republic, owns 18 villages, and had moved from Basra except for a group that remained there.

== Origin of the name ==
Harir Mountain is the original home of the Hariris which their historical origin goes back to Harir ibn al-Harith ibn Zayd ibn Yarim ibn Dhu-Ra'een, with their descendants, including Shams al-Din and the Fakhreddin families. Some of them lived in this mountain, some of them migrated to other places, and some of them settled in Aden and are called "Al-Hariri". Harir Mountain has many historical landmarks and monuments, indicating that ancient man inhabited the peaks of the mountain. There are some ancient inscriptions and writings on Rumah and Attaba. In boulders, some old rocks, and dams carved into the mountain, as well as cemeteries, and some old fortresses, which are believed to be related to the ruins of Aqram Mountain in Shekaa.

== See also ==
- Jabal An-Nabi Shu'ayb
