= Politburo of the 1st Congress of the Yemeni Socialist Party =

1st Politburo
- Emblem of the Yemeni Socialist Party

13 October 1978 – 14 October 1980 (2 years, 1 day) Overview
- Type: Political organ
- Election: 1st Session of the Central Committee of the 1st Congress

Members
- Total: 9 members
- Newcomers: 4 members (1st)
- Old: 5 members (UPONF)
- Reelected: 1 member (2nd)

This electoral term of the Politburo was elected by the 1st Session of the Central Committee of the 1st Congress of the Yemeni Socialist Party in 1978, and was in session until the gathering of the 2nd Congress in 1980.

== Composition ==
=== Members ===
Members of the Politburo of the 1st Congress of the Yemeni Socialist Party
Ballot	Name		UNFPO	2nd POL	Birth	PM	Death	Birthplace	Region	Ref.
1	Abdul Fattah Ismail (Note: Abdul Fattah Ismail was critiqued by his opponent at an emergency session of YSP Central Committee on 20 April 1980. Not having the numbers in either the politburo or the Central Committee, Ismail voluntarily resigned from all his offices, was elected honorary chairman of the YSP Central Committee, and was sent into exile in the Soviet Union.)	عبد الفتاح إسماعيل	Member	Resigned	1939	1978	1986	Taiz	Northener	
2	Ali Nasser Mohammed	علي ناصر محمد	Member	Member	1939	1978	Alive	Abyan	Southener	
3	Ali Abdul Razzaq Badeeb	علي عبدالرزاق باذيب	Nonmember	Nonmember	1934	1978	1991	Hadramawt	Southener	
4	Anis Hassan Yahya	أنيس حسن يحيى	Nonmember	Nonmember	1934	1978	Alive	Aden	Southener	
5	Muhammad Salih Mutia (Note: Muhammad Salih Mutia was an active participant in the removal of Abdul Fattah Ismail as YSP general secretary in April 1980, but by "late summer 1981" he had apparently been put under house arrest. This was not made public until February 1981.)	محمد صالح مطيع	Member	Removed	1940	1978	1982	Aden	Southener	
6	Salih Muslih Qasim	صالح مصلح قاسم	Member	Nonmember	1942	1978	1986	Dhale	Southener	
7	Abdulaziz Abdulwali	عبد العزيز عبد الولي	Nonmember	Nonmember	1944	1978	1984	Taiz	Northener	
8	Ali Salem al-Beidh	علي سالم البيض	Member	Nonmember	1939	1978	Alive	Hadhramaut	Southener	
9	Muhammad Said Abdullah	محمد سعد عبد الله	Nonmember	Nonmember	1934	1978	2002	Hadhramaut	Northener	

=== Candidates ===
Candidates of the Politburo of the 1st Congress of the Yemeni Socialist Party
Ballot	Name		UNFPO	2nd CC	Birth	PM	Death	Birthplace	Region	Ref.
1	Ali Ahmed Nasser Antar	علي أحمد ناصر عنتر	Nonmember	Member	1936	1978	1986	Dhale	Southener	
2	Salim Saleh Muhammad	سالم صالح محمد	Nonmember	Nonmember	1947	1978	Alive	Hadramawt	Southener	
