= Al-Shabatayn =

Al-Shabatayn الشعبتين
- Village
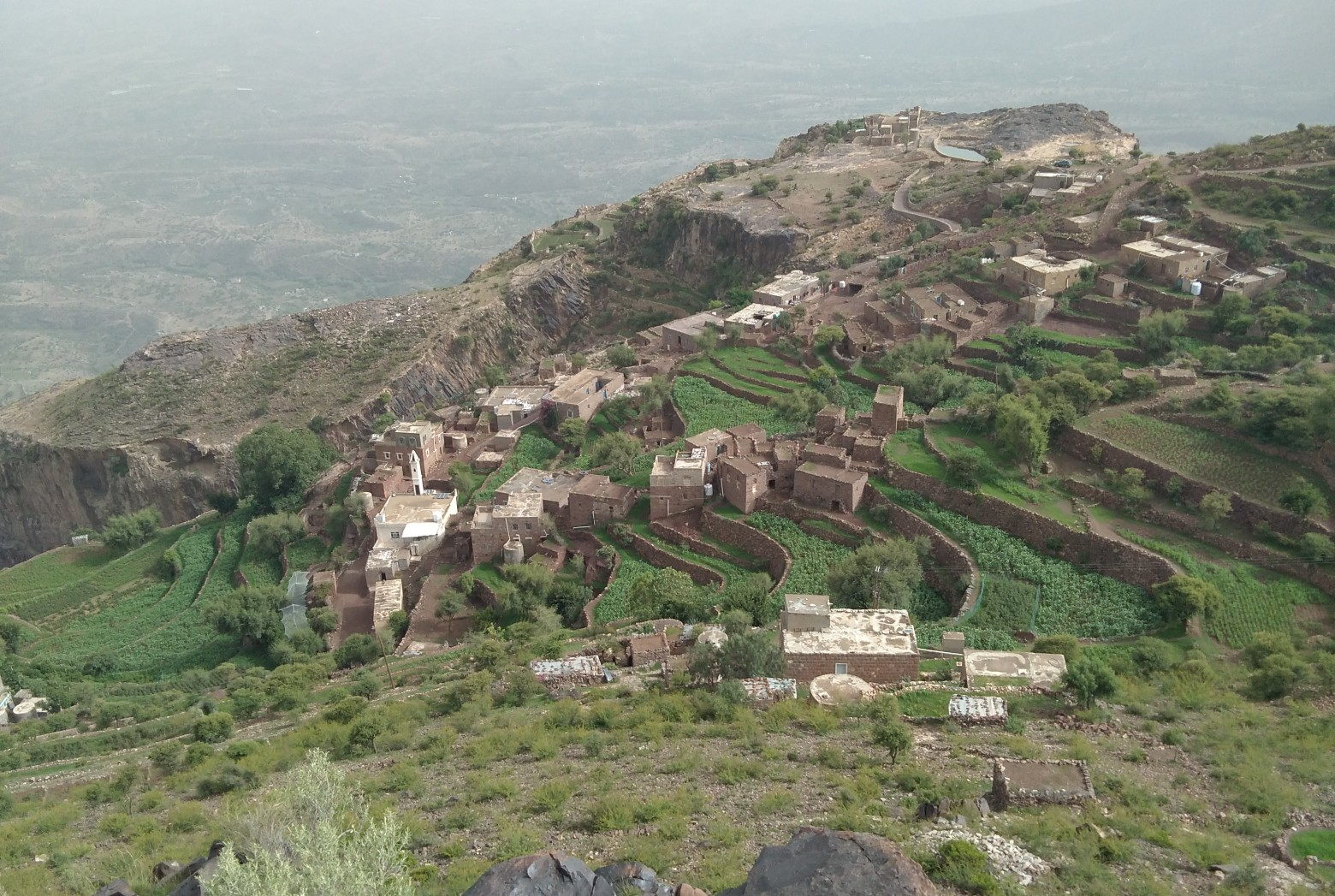
- General view of Al-Shabatayn village in Jahaf District

- Location in Yemen
- Coordinates: 13°44′0.34″N 44°38′15.60″E
- Country: Yemen
- Governorate: Dhale
- District: Jahaf
- Sub-district (Uzlah): Bani Said
- Elevation: 2,290 m (7,510 ft)

Population
  - Total: 608
- Time zone: UTC+3 (AST)

Al-Shabatayn (Arabic: الشعبتين) is a village in Yemen. It is administratively part of Bani Said sub-district (uzlah), Jahaf District, Dhale Governorate.

The village is bordered by Hajar to the north, Sabrah and Al-Harf to the south, Al-Kawmalah and Al-Hayb to the east, and Al-Rakkah Al-Ulya and Al-Rakkah Al-Sufla to the west, which border Dhale District.

== Economy ==
=== Agriculture ===
Agriculture accounts for approximately 10% of the total income. The main crops include sorghum, millet, red corn, and Yemeni coffee. Livestock rearing is also practiced, including cattle, sheep, and goats, primarily through household-based systems.

Agricultural production has declined significantly due to water scarcity, reliance on rainwater, and the lack of water sources.

=== Al-Shabatayn, Al-Aydah, and Al-Rakkah Social Charity Association ===
This charitable cooperative association was founded in 2015. It carries out various developmental and humanitarian activities. The association has an official headquarters and a library for preserving documents and records. It is officially registered with the ministry and seeks support to further its community development efforts.

== Sub-villages ==
Al-Shabatayn has approximately seven subsidiary villages, including:

- Al-Malih
- Al-Safh
- Al-Safa
- Fawq Al-Jaws
- Al-Dhira'
- Tayf Al-Shabatayn
- Sharaf Khabzah

Most residents have migrated to Dhale city, Hajar, and other areas.

=== Main affiliated villages ===
The following three villages are administratively, financially, and socially affiliated with Al-Shabatayn, listed from most to least populous:

1. Al-Ghaydah
2. Al-Rakkah
3. Al-Hubayshi
4. Darj Al-Bunn

== Geology ==
Al-Shabatayn is located in the central highlands of Yemen at an elevation of 2,290 meters. The terrain features rugged mountains, steep escarpments, and exposed volcanic and basement rocks typical of the region. The landscape is shaped by erosion, creating natural terraces and rock formations.

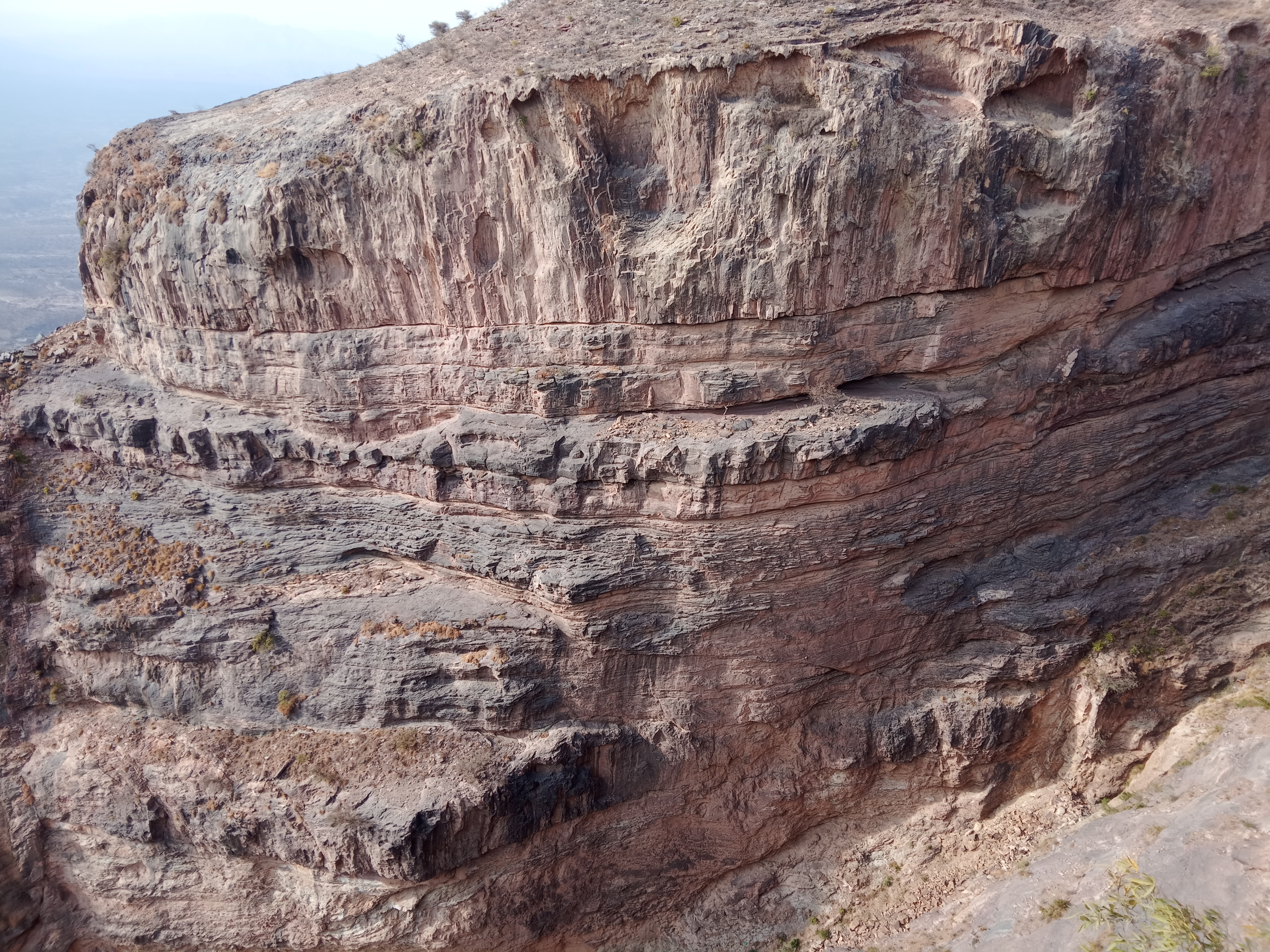
"Foot Rest" — a notable rock formation

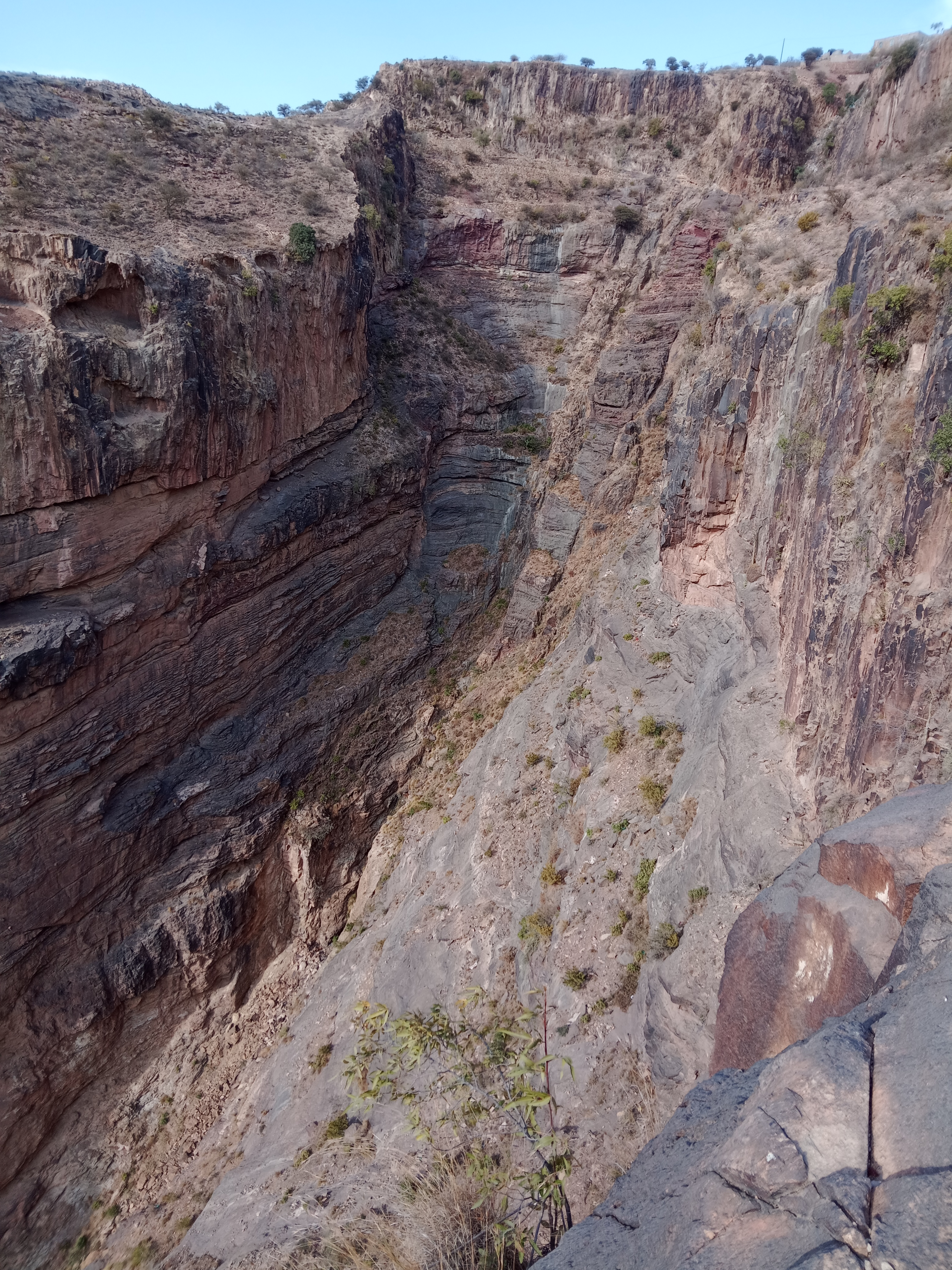
Rocky escarpment in the area

The rocky terrain limits soil cover and water retention, making rainwater harvesting and small dams essential for agriculture.

== Gallery ==
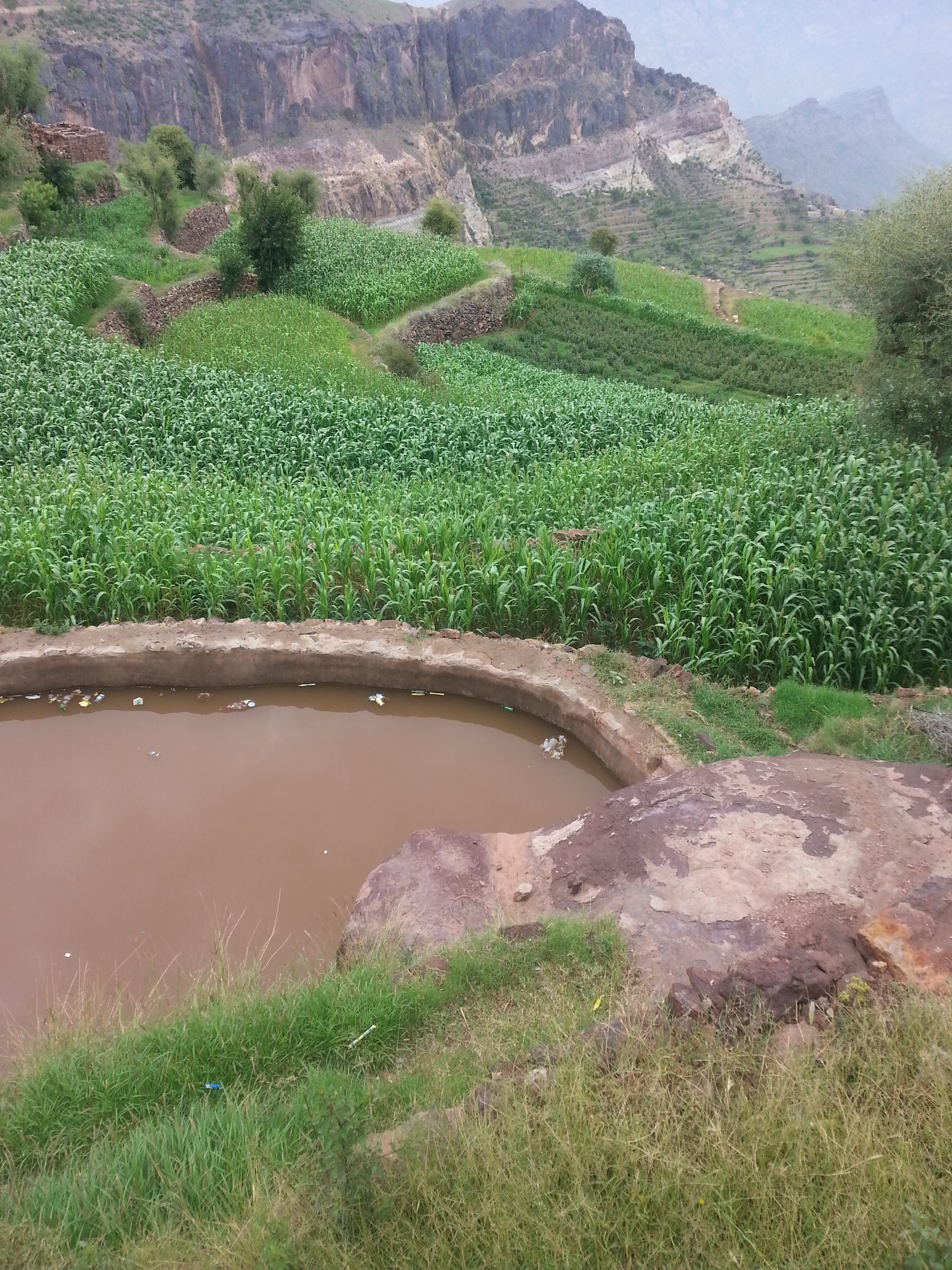
Dams for rainwater harvesting

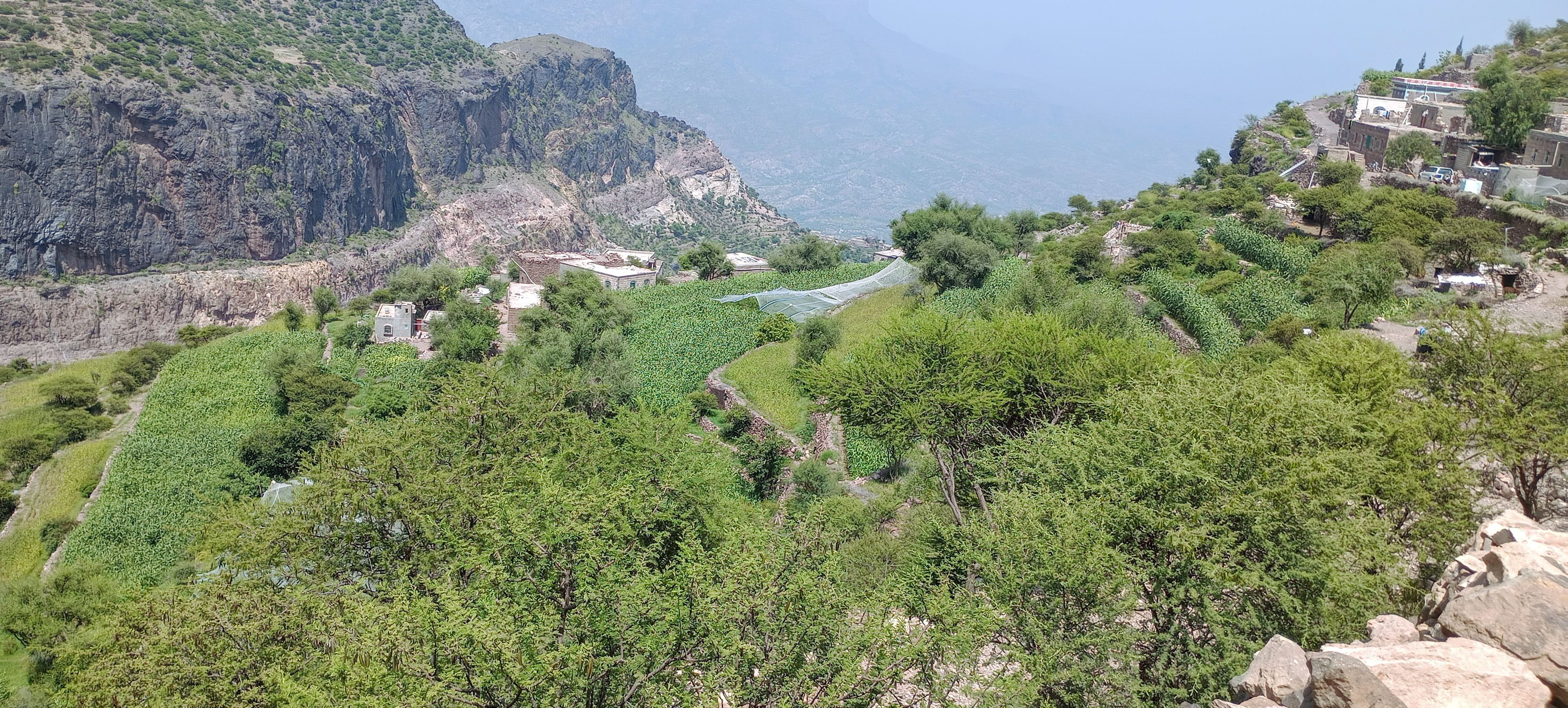
Al-Ghaydah village in Jahaf

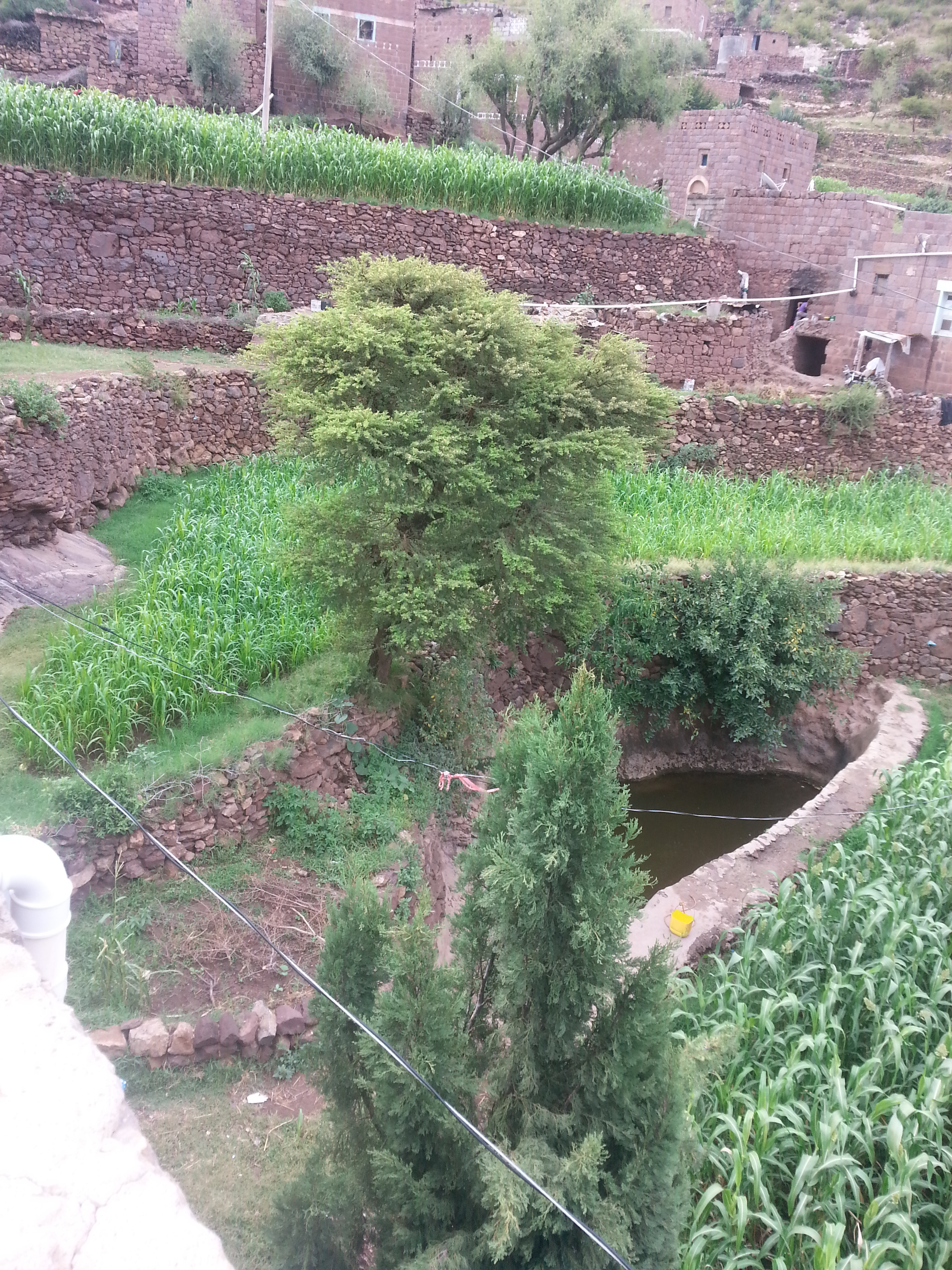
Rainwater harvesting dams in Al-Shabatayn

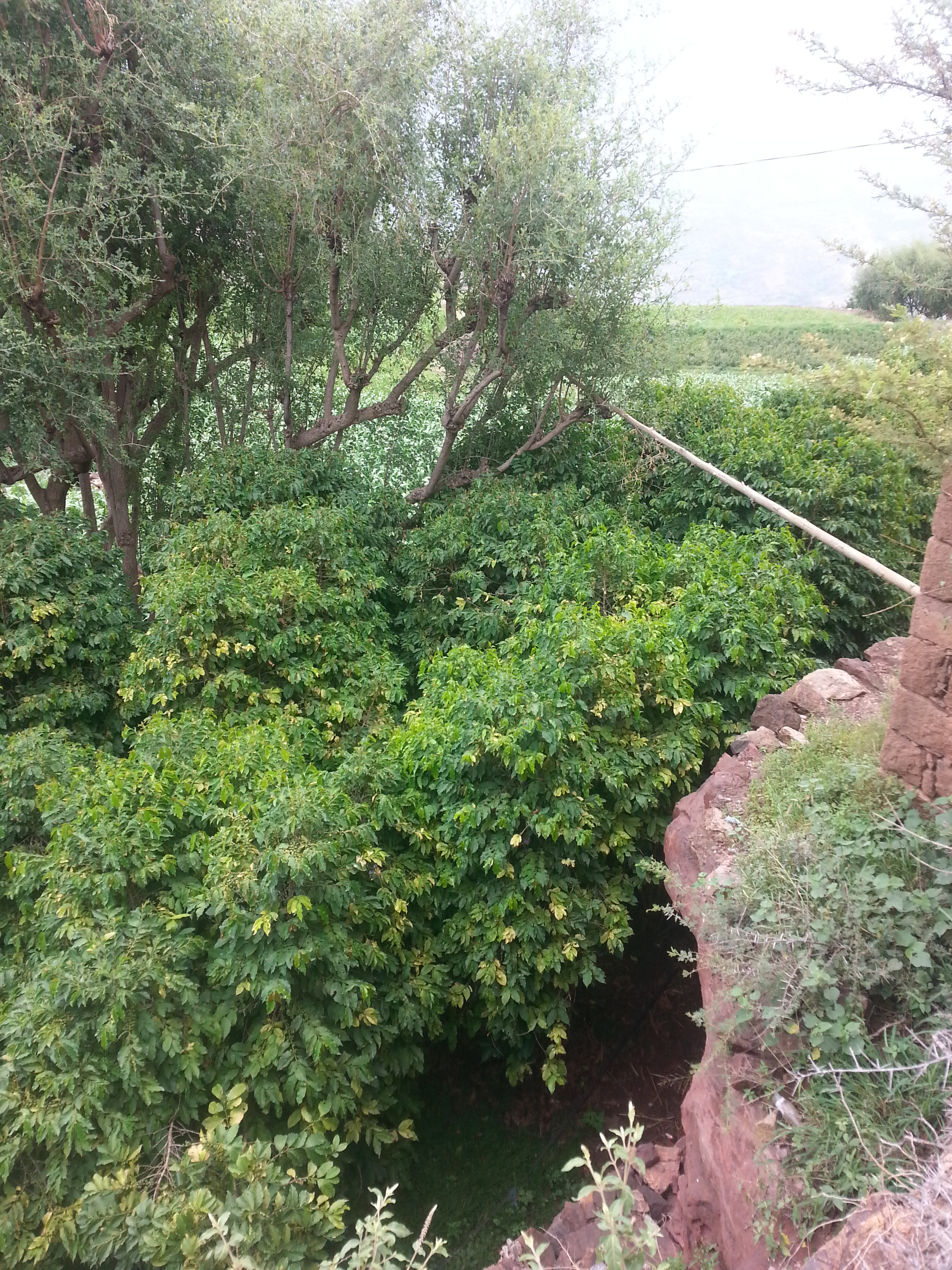
Traditional stone terraces

== See also ==
- Jahaf District
- Bani Said
