= Bani Said =

Bani Said بني سعيد
- Uzlah (sub-district)
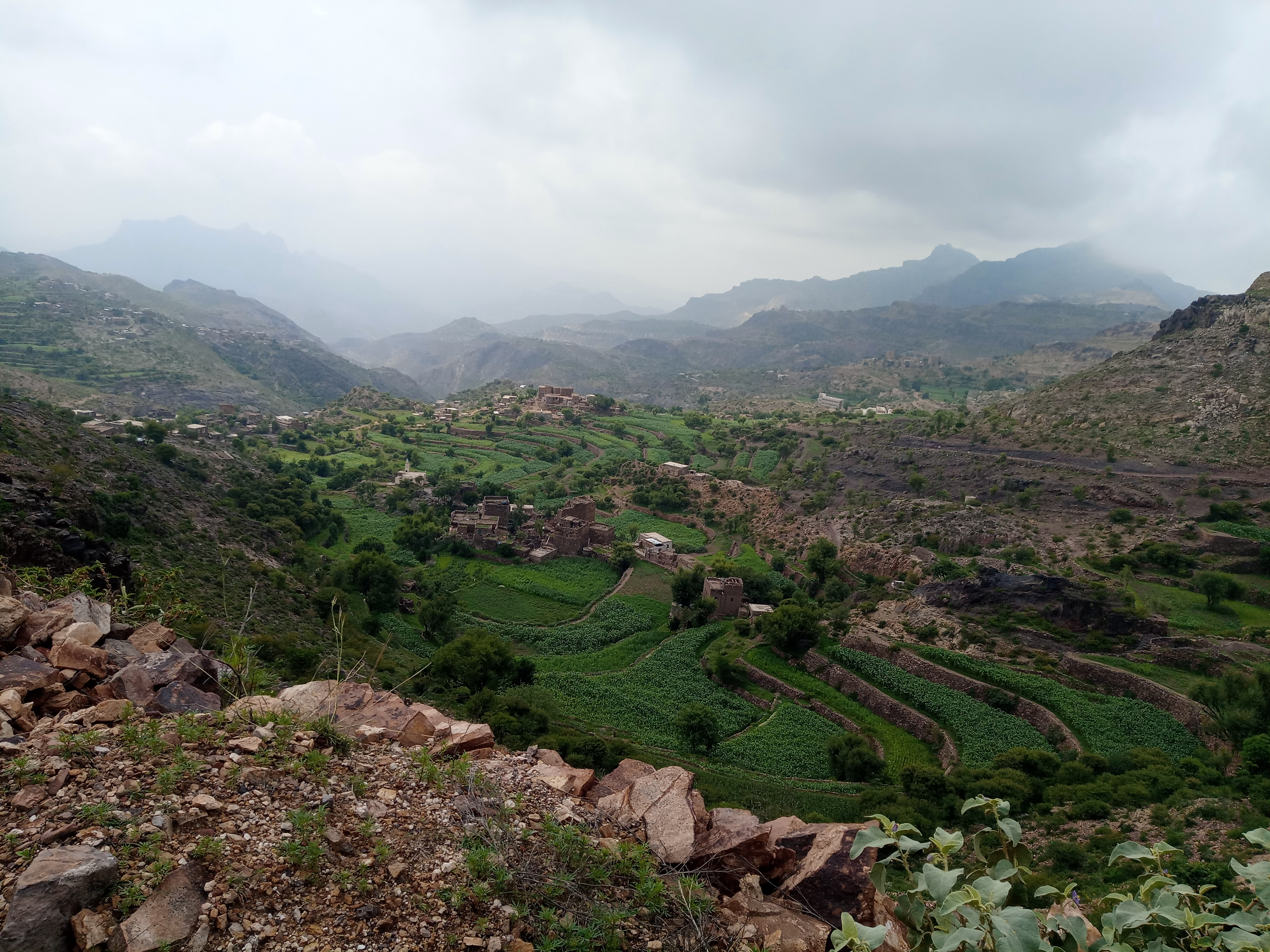
- Village of Al-Shabatayn in Bani Said
- Nickname: Al-Sa'idi
- Location in Yemen
- Coordinates: 13.7333°N 44.6375°E
- Country: Yemen
- Governorate: Dhale
- District: Jahaf
- Time zone: UTC+3

Bani Said (Arabic: بني سعيد) is a sub-district (uzlah) of Jahaf district in Dhale Governorate, Yemen. It is one of three sub-districts that make up the district. Bani Said is the farthest sub-district from the city of Dhale and is home to Al-Nasr Secondary School, the largest school in the district by student enrollment.

== Villages ==
Bani Said consists of the following villages:

- Al-Shabatayn
- Sabrah
- Al-Kawmalah
- Al-Hayb
- Bani Khalaf
- Tahma wa Al-Jarbah
- Al-Raddah
- Abr
- Al-Khawrah
- Nashmah
- Al-Sha'b
- Al-Kharfah
- Thammad
- Sha'b Najid
- Al-Hadaf
- Arasim
- Affah
- Al-Najirah

=== Mountains ===
The highest mountain is Jabal Nabi Ayyub in Thammad village, which features a mosque at its summit and a tomb believed to be that of the Prophet Job. Jabal Al-Harf is the second highest peak in the area.

== See also ==
- Jabal Jahaf
