= Politburo of the 2nd Congress of the Yemeni Socialist Party =

Yemeni political body 1980-1985

2nd Politburo
- Emblem of the Yemeni Socialist Party

14 October 1980 – 13 October 1985 (4 years, 364 days) Overview
- Type: Political organ
- Election: 1st Session of the Central Committee of the 2nd Congress

Members
- Total: 12 members
- Newcomers: 4 members (2nd)
- Old: 1 members (1st)
- Reelected: 12 member (3rd)
- By-elected: 7 individuals (2nd)

This electoral term of the Politburo was elected by the 1st Session of the Central Committee of the 2nd Congress of the Yemeni Socialist Party in 1980, and was in session until the gathering of the 3rd Congress in 1985.

== Composition ==
=== Members ===
Members of the Politburo of the 2nd Congress of the Yemeni Socialist Party
Name		1st POL	3rd POL	Birth	PM	Death	Birthplace	Region	Ref.
Abdulaziz Abdulghani	عبد الغني عبد القادر	Nonmember	Member	?	1978	Alive	?	?	
Abdel Aziz ad-Dali (Note: Salim Salih Muhammad was by-elected as a member at the YSP Central Committee session held on 13–20 May 1984.)	عبد العزيز الدالي	By-elected	Member	1937	1978	2020	Aden	Northener	
Haidar Abu Bakr al-Attas (Note: Haidar Abu Bakr al-Attas was by-elected as a member at the YSP Central Committee session held on 3–11 February 1985.)	حيدر أبو بكر العطاس	By-elected	Member	1939	1978	Alive	Hadhramaut	Southerner	
Ali Ahmed Nasser Antar	علي أحمد ناصر عنتر	Nonmember	Member	1936	1978	1986	Dhale	Southener	
Salih Munassar as-Siyayli	صالح منصار السيلي	Nonmember	Member	1945	1978	1994	Hadhramaut	Southerner	
Abu Bakr Abd Razzaq Badeeb	أنيس حسن يحيى	Nonmember	Member	1940	1978	2021	Hadramawt	Southener	
Ali Abdul Razzaq Badeeb (Note: Ali Abdul Razzaq Badeeb was by-elected as a member at the YSP Central Committee session held on 13–20 May 1984.)	محمد سعد عبد الله	By-elected	Member	1934	1978	1991	Hadramawt	Southener	
Ali Shayi Hadi (Note: Ali Shayi Hadi was by-elected from candidate to member-status at the YSP Central Committee session held on 3–11 February 1985.)	علي شايع هادي	By-elected	Member	1945	1978	1986	Lahij	Southener	
Ali Nasser Mohammed	علي ناصر محمد	Member	Member	1939	1978	Alive	Abyan	Southener	
Salim Salih Muhammad (Note: Salim Salih Muhammad was by-elected as a member at the YSP Central Committee session held on 13–20 May 1984.)	سليم صالح محمد	By-elected	Member	1947	1978	Alive	Hadramawt	Southener	
Salih Musleh Qassim (Note: Salih Musleh Qassim was by-elected as a member at the YSP Central Committee session held on 13–20 May 1984.)	صالح مصلح قاسم	By-elected	Member	1942	1978	1986	Dhale	Southener	
Anis Hasan Yahya (Note: Anis Hasan Yahya was by-elected as a member at the YSP Central Committee session held on 13–20 May 1984.)	محمد سعد عبد الله	By-elected	Member	1934	1978	Alive	Aden	Southener	

=== Candidates ===
Candidates of the Politburo of the 2nd Congress of the Yemeni Socialist Party
Name		1st POL	3rd POL	Birth	PM	Death	Birthplace	Region	Ref.
Abdullah Ahmad al-Khamiri	عبدالله أحمد الخميري	Nonmember	Alternate	1930	1978	Alive	Aden	Northener	
Ali Shayi Hadi (Note: Ali Shayi Hadi was by-elected to member-status at the YSP Central Committee session held on 3–11 February 1985.)	علي شايع هادي	Nonmember	By-elected	1945	1978	1986	Lahij	Southener	
