= Jabal Jahaf =

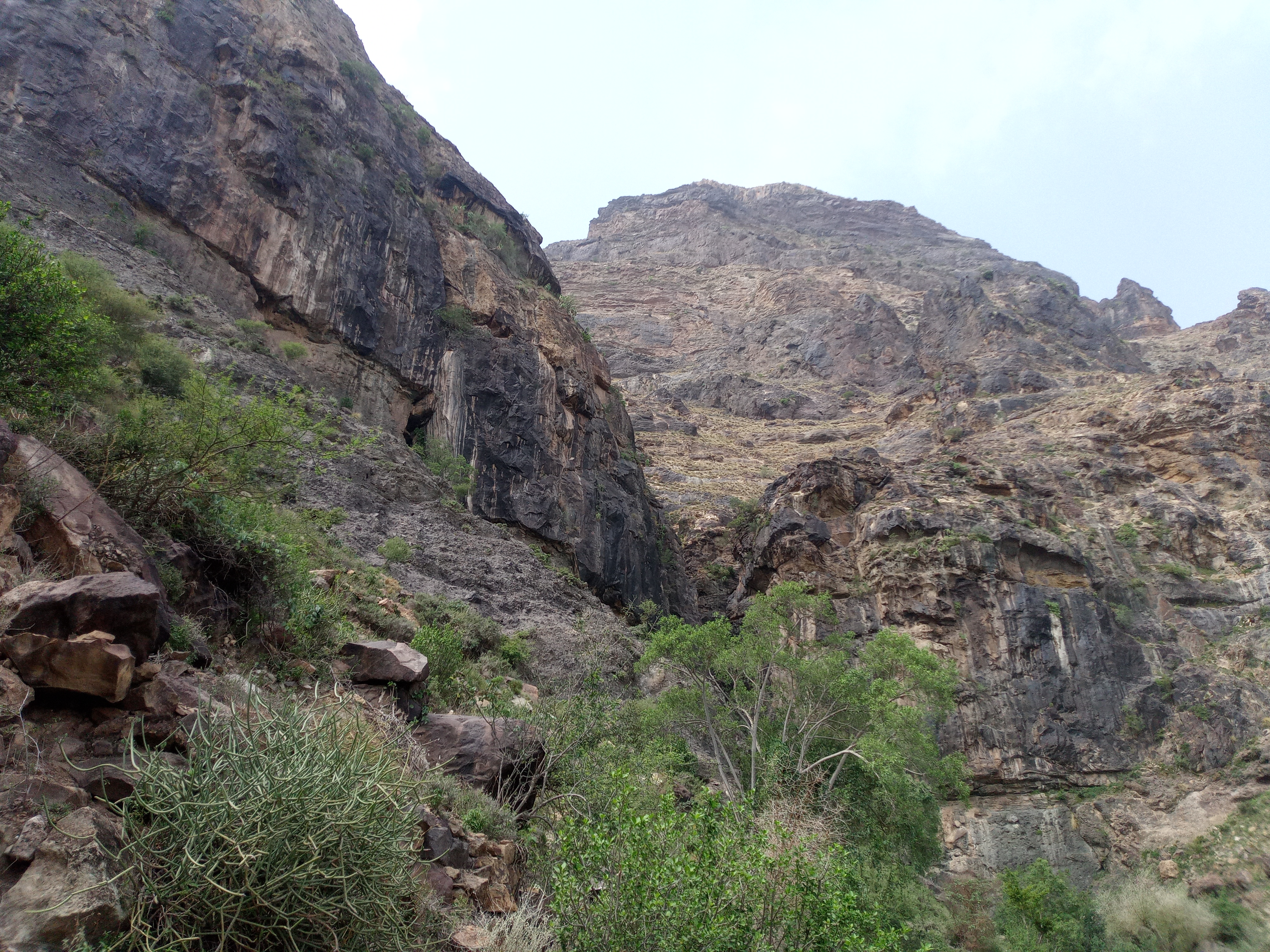
- View of Jabal Jihaf from below Naqil Al-Shabatayn western side

Highest point
- Elevation: 2,401 m (7,877 ft)
- Coordinates: 13°45′39″N 44°40′36″E

Naming
- Native name: جبل جحاف

Geography
- Location within Yemen
- Location: Jahaf District, Dhale Governorate, Yemen
- Parent range: Jahaf Mountains

Jabal Jihaf (Arabic: جبل جحاف) is a prominent mountain in Dhale Governorate, Yemen. With an elevation of 2,401 meters (7,877 feet) at its highest peak, Jabal Al-Manara, it is one of the highest mountains in the region. The mountain gives its name to Jahaf District, in which it is located, and holds strategic and historical significance as a prominent natural landmark.

== Geography ==
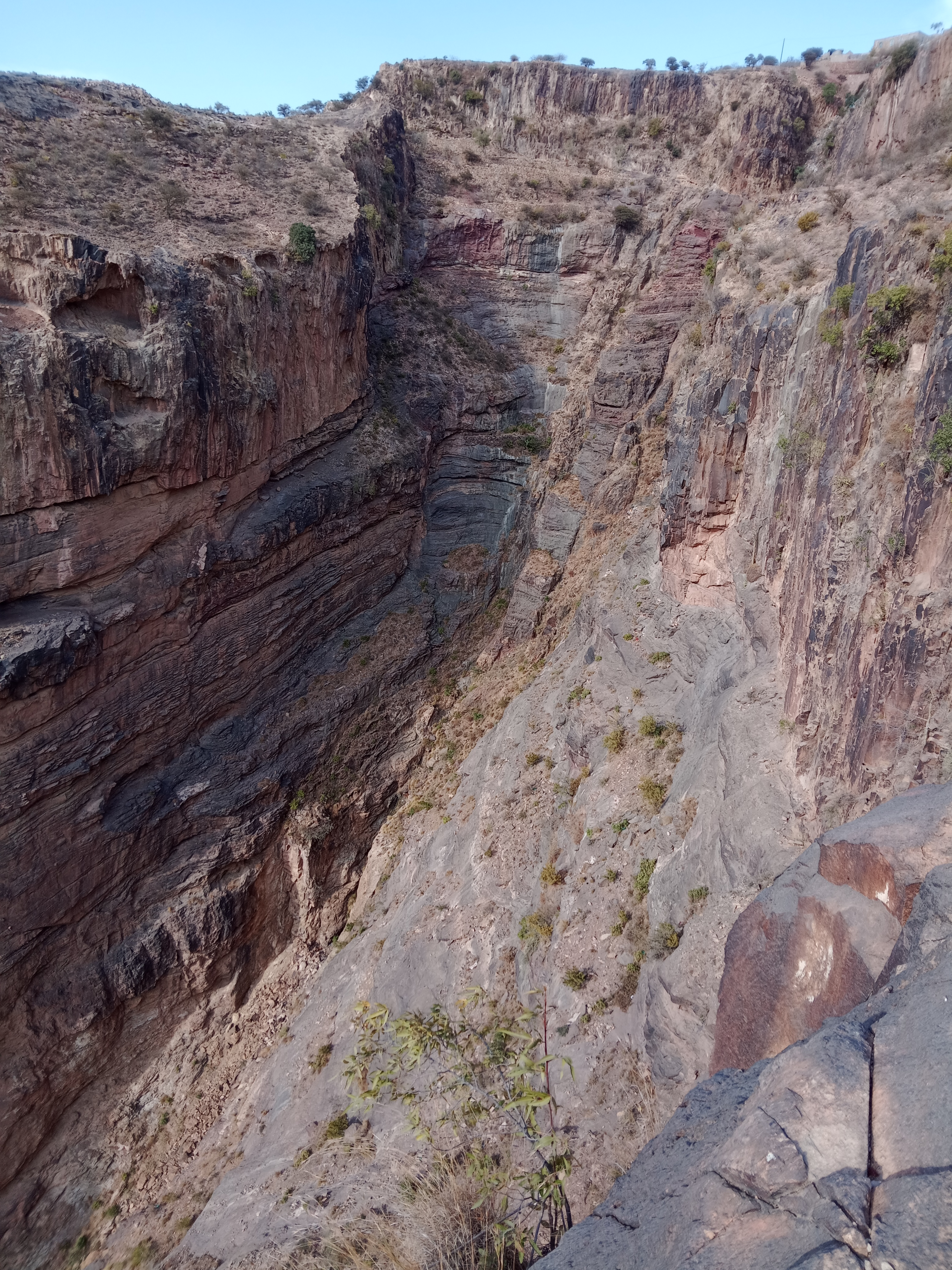
Rocky escarpment

Jabal Jahaf is located between latitudes 13°50′ and 13°55′ N, and longitudes 44°40′ and 44°45′ E. It lies approximately 20 kilometers northeast of the town of Qa'tabah and forms a natural boundary between parts of Dhale Governorate and Ibb Governorate.

The mountain wraps around the western side of the Dhale plain. Its highest peak, Jabal Al-Manara, rises to 2,401 meters (7,877 feet) above sea level. The central portion of the mountain forms a fractured plateau at approximately 2,100 meters (7,000 feet), while the northern and southern sides feature steep escarpments leading to deep valleys.

=== Valleys ===
The northern slopes contain three main escarpments: Jabal Al-Arqub, Hayd Al-Qasami, and Jabal Amal. The major valleys on the northern side are Wadi Haywat and Wadi Matar.

On the southern side, the main valley is divided into three sections:

- Upper section: Wadi Rayhan
- Middle section: Silat Al-Habil
- Lower section: Wadi Tuban

This valley lies between the Al-Ma'fari escarpment to the east and the Al-Humaydi escarpment to the west. Another valley, Wadi Sha'b Al-Ajroudi, originates east of Al-Sarir village and flows southeast toward the agricultural lands of Wadi Ma'abir, west of Dhale city.

=== Peaks ===
The central plateau is bordered to the north by a line of peaks including:

- Jabal Al-Manara (highest peak)
- Jabal Bani Khudair
- Jabal Al-Masna'ah
- Jabal Al-Nawb

To the east, two prominent peaks rise: Jabal Rabak and Jabal Shajan.

=== Strategic Position ===
From the summit of Jabal Jahaf, one can observe wide areas to the north across the plains of Bilad Al-Hajar, extending to Jabal Al-Sha'r, Jabal Al-Awd, Jabal Mares to the west, and as far as Wadi Tuban and Jabal Sihban.

== Natural Features ==
=== Water Resources ===
The central area of Jabal Jahaf contains abundant water springs and wells, numbering over 360. These water sources have historically supported agriculture and human settlement in the region.

=== Terrain ===
The mountain features rugged terrain with steep slopes, particularly on the eastern and northern sides, while the western slopes are relatively gentler. The elevation difference between the plateau and the surrounding valleys can reach several hundred meters.

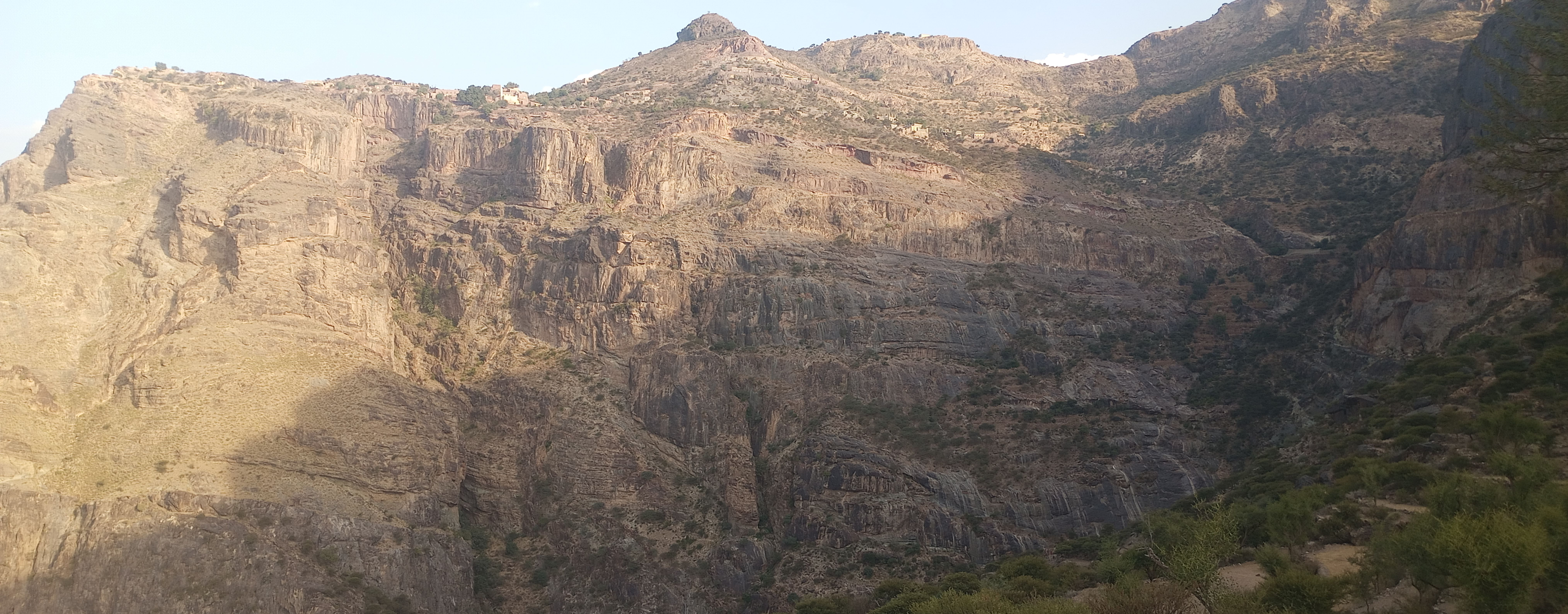
Western side of Jabal Jahaf

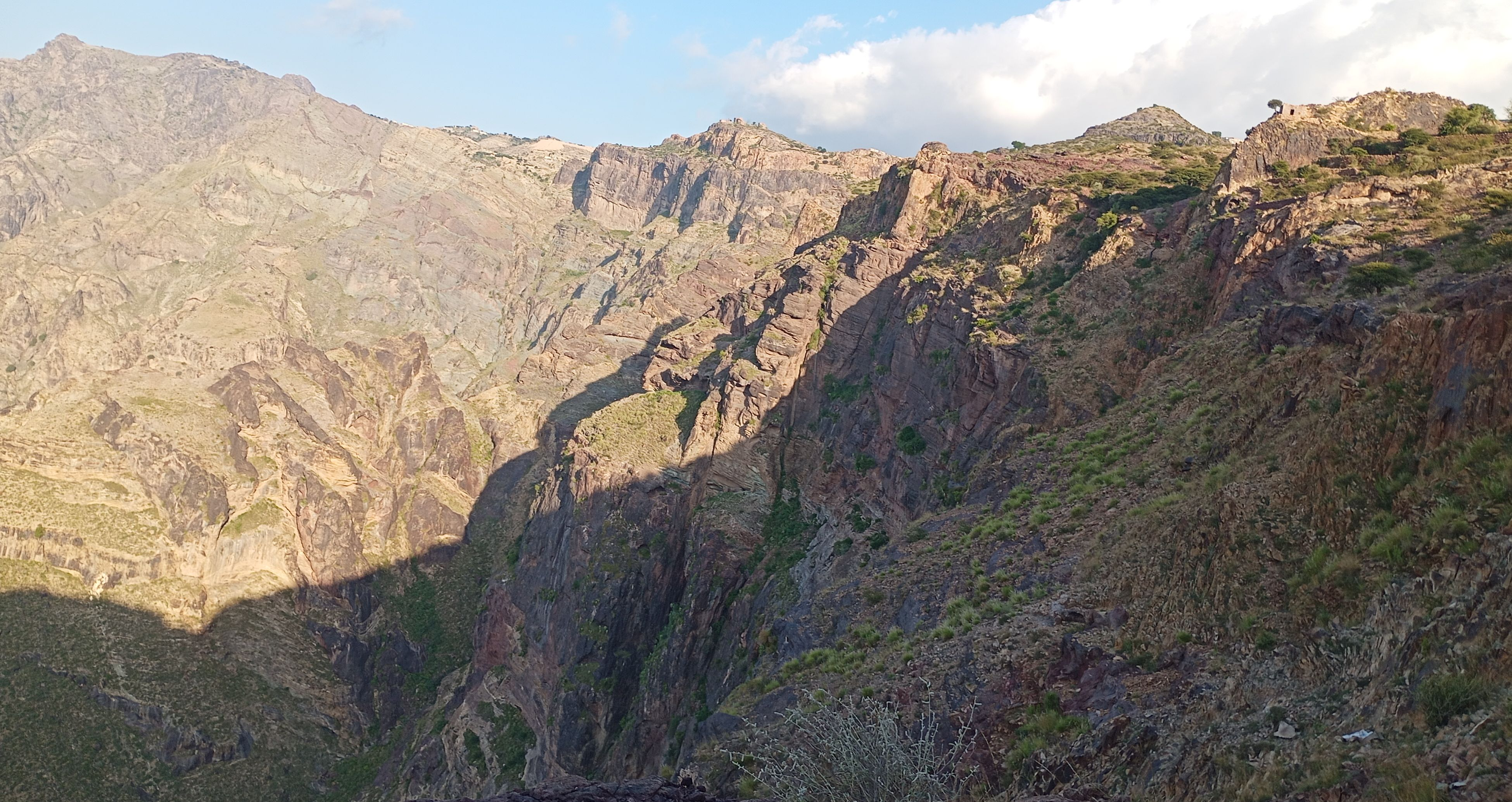
View of Jabal Jahaf from Naqil Al-Shabatayn area

== See also ==
- Jahaf District
- Dhale Governorate
