= Al-Mu'ayyad Muhammad (died 1503) =

Yemeni Muslim religious leader

Al-Mu'ayyad Muhammad (died February 25, 1503) was a Zaydi imam of Yemen who ruled in parts of the Yemeni highland including Sanaa in 1462–1503.

== Repulsing the Tahirides ==
He was a son of the former imam al-Mansur an-Nasir who died while imprisoned in Kawkaban in 1462. At this time the Yemeni highland was contested between several imams, most prominently al-Mutawakkil al-Mutahhar who lost Sanaa to the Tahiride Dynasty in July 1462. The Tahirides were a Sunni dynasty based in Zabid and Taiz in the lowland. Al-Mu'ayyad Muhammad, who had proclaimed his imamate on the death of his father, moved to bring back the important city within the Zaydiyyah fold. In 1464, his officer Muhammad bin Isa Sharib tricked his way into Sanaa by impersonating the Tahiride governor, who bore the same name. In the next year a Tahiride army made an abortive attempt to retake the city. The troops withdrew after al-Mu'ayyad Muhammad promised to pay tribute. War was resumed later in the same year, but this time the Tahiride prince Amir was killed.

== Lord of Sanaa ==
After 1465 the imam was left in peace as lord of Sanaa (Sahib Sanaa) for 36 years. However, he only controlled part of the highland. The sons of the old imam al-Mutawakkil al-Mutahhar dominated Kawkaban, and the region around the traditional Zaydi centre Saada was divided between imam al-Mansur Muhammad and two other factions. Al-Mu'ayyad Muhammad was reportedly a good administrator and a man of learning. For a long time he entertained good relations with the Tahiride Sultan Amir. Finally, however, the sultan attacked Dhamar and then Sanaa in 1501. In spite of the use of mangonels to break the walls, the city held firm. After five months Sultan Amir burnt the equipment that could not be brought along and retreated, defeating a pursuing Zaydi force. Shortly after, in early 1503 (Sha'ban 908 AH), al-Mu'ayyad Muhammad died. His old commander Sharib continued to exercise power in Sanaa and the latter's brother was declared imam as al-Mustansir Ahmad, though he is not counted in the official list of imams. Already in 1504, however, Sanaa was conquered by the Tahiride sultan.

== See also ==
- Rassids
- History of Yemen

Preceded by al-Mansur an-Nasir	Zaydi Imam of Yemen; 1462–1503	Succeeded by an-Nasir al-Hasan and al-Mansur Muhammad
