= People's Vanguard Party =

People's Vanguard Party is a name used by several political parties:

- People's Vanguard Party (Costa Rica)
- People's Vanguard Party (Yemen)
- People's Vanguard Party (Venezuela)
- People's Vanguard (Argentine)

== See also ==
- Popular Socialist Vanguard (Chile)
- Popular Revolutionary Vanguard (Brazil)
