= An-Nasir al-Hasan =

Imam of the Zaidi state (1457–1523)

An-Nasir al-Hasan (1457 - June 24, 1523) was an imam of the Zaidi state in Yemen, who exerted a limited authority in the northern Yemeni highland in 1495–1523.

Al-Hasan bin Izz al-Din was the son of the forceful imam al-Hadi Izz al-Din. After the death of the latter in 1495, al-Hasan proclaimed his call for the imamate under the name an-Nasir al-Hasan. He inherited his father's love for learning, but hardly his political skills. Zaidi tradition depicts him positively as a shelter for widows and orphans, and a haven for the weak. Nevertheless, an-Nasir al-Hasan could only control a limited area in the northern highlands. For many years he had to resist the rival imam al-Mansur Muhammad (d. 1505). Al-Mansur was captured and poisoned by the Tahiride Sultan Amir in 1504, and the Tahirides seized San'a. In later years, an-Nasir al-Hasan was eclipsed by a new powerful imam, al-Mutawakkil Yahya Sharaf ad-Din (r. 1506–1555). He died in obscurity in 1523 and was buried in Falala. He sired nine sons, Muhammad, Izz al-Din, Majd ad-Din, Da'ud, Ahmad, Salah, Yahya, Taj ad-Din, and Ali. Majd ad-Din made his call for the imamate after his father's demise, but was unsuccessful and died in 1536 without ever holding political power.

== See also ==
- Imams of Yemen
- Rassids
- History of Yemen

Preceded by al-Hadi Izz al-Din	Zaydi Imam of Yemen; 1495–1523	Succeeded by al-Mutawakkil Yahya Sharaf ad-Din
