= An-Nasir Muhammad bin Yusuf =

An-Nasir Muhammad bin Yusuf (died August 8, 1488) was a contender for the Zaidi state in Yemen, whose term as imam is counted from 1474 to 1488.

Muhammad bin Yusuf was a descendant of the imam al-Mahdi Ali (d. 1372) in the fifth generation. When the old imam al-Mutawakkil al-Mutahhar died in Dhamar in 1474, three claimants appeared on the scene. These included Muhammad bin Yusuf, who went from San'a to the mountainous stronghold Thula. From there he made his da'wa (call for the imamate), spreading the message to San'a, Falala and other Zaidi areas. He took the honorific name an-Nasir Muhammad. His two rivals were al-Mansur Muhammad and al-Hadi Izz ad-Din, who belonged to other branches of the Rassids. One Zaidi faction, the Hamzite Sharifs, actually heeded his call and acknowledged him from April 1476 to October–November 1487. Nevertheless, the people of the traditional centre of the Zaydiyyah community, Sa'dah, refused to support him and instead proclaimed al-Hadi Izz ad-Din. An-Nasir Muhammad was considered to have the best doctrinal knowledge of his contemporaries, but luck was not on his side. Neither of the claimants was able to control the key city San'a, which was in the hands of a fourth imam, al-Mu’ayyad Muhammad, since 1464. An-Nasir Muhammad died after a fairly obscure tenure in 1488, and was buried in the dome in Thula.

== See also ==
- Imams of Yemen
- Rassids
- History of Yemen

Preceded by al-Mutawakkil al-Mutahhar	Zaydi Imam of Yemen; 1474–1488	Succeeded by al-Hadi Izz ad-din
