= Saleh Musleh Qassem =

Yemeni military commander and politician

- صالح مصلح قاسم

Minister of Defense
- In office 1982 – 13 January 1986
- President: Ali Nasir Muhammad

Minister of Interior
- In office 1980–1982

Personal details
- Born: 1942 Al-Madu, Ash Shu'ayb district, Dhale Governorate
- Died: 13 January 1986 (aged 43–44) Aden
- Party: Yemeni Socialist Party

Saleh Musleh Qassem (c. 1942 – 13 January 1986) was a Yemeni politician and military commander in the People's Defense Forces of South Yemen. He was a leading member of the Yemeni Socialist Party (YSP). He served as Minister of Interior from 1980 to 1982, and later as the Minister of Defense from 1982 until his death in 1986 in the January 13 massacre.

== Early life ==
Saleh Musleh Qassem was born in 1942 in the village of Al-Madu in Ash Shu'ayb district of Dhale Governorate. He became involved in the anti-colonial movement against British rule in the 1960s.

== Military and political career ==
He joined the National Liberation Front (NLF) during the struggle against British colonial rule in South Arabia. Following the independence of South Yemen in 1967, he rose through the ranks of the newly established armed forces. He was known for his close association with the leftist faction within the NLF, which later formed the Yemeni Socialist Party in 1978.

Throughout the 1970s and early 1980s, Saleh Musleh held several key command positions, including command of the 22nd Infantry Brigade. He was appointed Minister of Interior around 1980, and subsequently served as Minister of Defense from 1982 until his death. In these capacities, he played a central role in shaping the country's security apparatus and was considered a leading figure in the hardline faction within the YSP.

== Death ==
Saleh Musleh Qassem was killed in Aden on 13 January 1986, at the outset of the bloody intra-party conflict that erupted between factions of the Yemeni Socialist Party. The violence, often referred to as the "Events of 13 January," pitted supporters of President Ali Nasir Muhammad against a coalition of rival factions within the party leadership. Saleh Musleh, aligned with the latter group, was among the first senior officials to be killed in the fighting, which resulted in thousands of casualties and led to a fundamental realignment of power in South Yemen.

== Honors and legacy ==
Saleh Musleh Qassem is remembered as one of the key architects of South Yemen's military establishment during the 1970s and 1980s. His death marked a significant turning point, contributing to the weakening of the party's hardline leadership ahead of the unification with North Yemen in 1990.

== See also ==
- Yemeni Socialist Party
- South Yemen Civil War
- People's Democratic Republic of Yemen
- National Liberation Front
- Ali Nasir Muhammad
