= January 13 massacre =

Massacre in South Yemen

Politburo Meeting Massacre (1986)
- Part of South Yemeni crisis
- Location: Central Committee Building, Tawahi, Aden, People's Democratic Republic of Yemen
- Date: 13 January 1986; Approximately 10:20 AM
- Target: Al-Tughma faction leaders within the Yemeni Socialist Party, including Abdul Fattah Ismail, Ali Salem al-Beidh, Ali Antar, Salih Muslih Qasim, and Ali Shayi' Hadi
- Attack type: Political assassination, mass shooting
- Weapons: Automatic weapons (Kalashnikov, Škorpion)
- Deaths: Ali Antar; Salih Muslih Qasim; Ali Shayi' Hadi; Abdul Fattah Ismail (disappeared and later confirmed killed)
- Perpetrator: Presidential guards of Ali Nasir Muhammad

The January 13 massacre was a massacre that took place on the morning of 13 January 1986, in the Central Committee meeting hall of the Yemeni Socialist Party in Aden, South Yemen. The massacre led to the death of Vice President Ali Antar, Defense Minister Saleh Muslih Qasim, and others, while former President Abdul Fattah Ismail disappeared before his death was later confirmed. This incident led to the outbreak of the South Yemeni crisis.

== Background ==
The mid-1980s marked an increase in disagreements within the ruling Yemeni Socialist Party in Democratic Yemen, and the party split into two main factions, Al-Zumrah, led by Ali Nasser Mohammed, and Al-Toughmah, led by figures such as Abdul Fattah Ismail (who returned from exile in Moscow in 1985) and Ali Antar.

The dispute over the division of the powers of the Political Bureau escalated, prompting President Ali Nasser Mohamed to call for an extraordinary meeting of the Political Bureau on January 13 to resolve the disputes.

== Events ==
Ali Nasir Muhammed announcing the liquidation of al-Toughmah faction

On the morning of 13 January 1986, opposition Politburo members arrived at the meeting room, while President Ali Nasser Mohamed was absent. The purpose of the meeting was to discuss disagreements over the distribution of leadership positions among the party's state and party leaders. Guards collected personal weapons from the leaders' entourages outside the hall, while the president's bodyguards were permitted to enter.

At 10:20 a.m., one of the president's guards,named Hassan, entered and started firing a machine gun at Vice President Ali Antar, killing him instantly. This coincided with the entry of another group of guards who fired heavily at those sitting in the opposition row.

The attack led to the killing of:

- Ali Ahmed Nasser Antar (Vice President).
- Saleh Musleh Qasim (Minister of Defense).
- Ali Shua'a Hadi (Chairman of the Party Discipline Committee).

Ali Salem al-Beidh and Abdel Fattah Ismail managed to survive the first wave of bullets by taking cover under tables and using the bodies of their comrades as cover, before their own bodyguards were able to break into the hall and engage the attackers, allowing them to escape to the back offices.

== Abdel Fattah Ismail's murder controversy ==
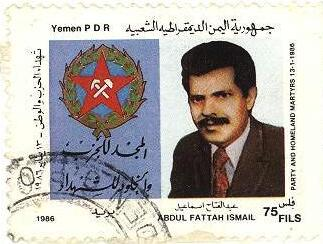
A postage stamp commemorating the martyrdom of Abdel Fattah Ismail, reading: "Glory to the Party and eternity for the martyrs"

The murder of Abdel Fattah Ismail, the party's founder and first ideologue, is the biggest mystery of these events, with differing accounts of how he was killed and the location of his body.

=== The official narrative ===
Initial post-war accounts claimed that Abdel Fattah Ismail boarded a military armored vehicle (BTR) to exit the area of clashes, but naval forces loyal to Ali Nasser Mohammed targeted the armored vehicle with a missile, causing it to catch fire and char those inside, making it impossible to find the body.

=== Liquidation narrative ===
An investigation and late testimonies of politicians who witnessed the event revealed that Abdel Fattah Ismail survived the platform incident and came out alive. These sources, including an Al Jazeera investigation and the program “The Detective”, point to an internal liquidation scenario carried out by his allies in the al-Toughmah faction. According to testimonies cited by historian Saeed al-Janahi and hints from former Prime Minister Haider Abu Bakr al-Attas, Abdul Fattah Ismail was sent to a "safe" place (believed to be a house or military headquarters) in coordination with leaders such as Ali Salem al-Beidh and Saeed Saleh.

It is believed that the rising leaders of the al-Zumrah faction saw Abdel Fattah Ismail and his radical doctrine as an obstacle to their ambitions or a political burden, so a decision was made to liquidate him in that place and hide his body, so that his fate remains unknown until today.

== Aftermath ==
The massacre triggered a violent street war in Aden that lasted for more than a week and ended with President Ali Nasser Mohammed and his forces getting defeated and fleeing with thousands of his supporters to the north. Ali Salem al-Beidh took power as the party's general secretary.

The subsequent civil war resulted in the death of thousands of party cadres, military personnel, and civilians.
