= Ar Rabīʻatayn =

Coordinates: 13°58′N 44°55′E

Ar Rabīʻatayn الربيعتين
- Sub-District
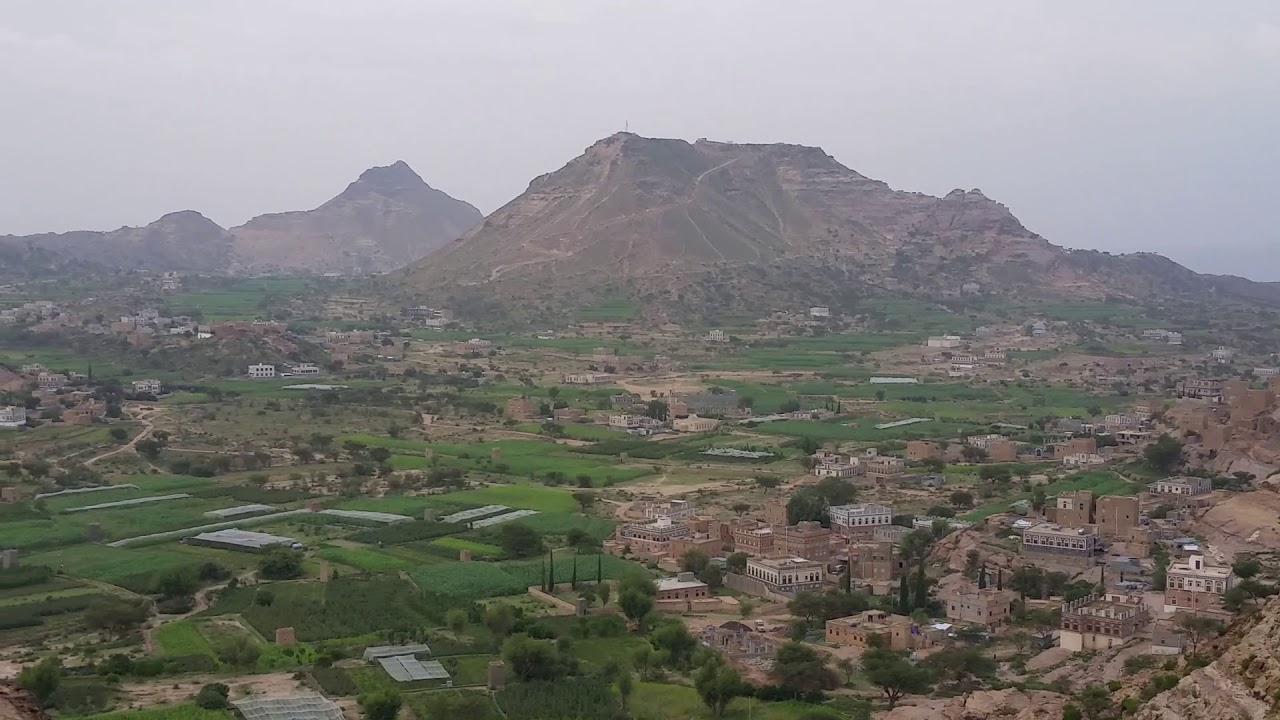
- Ar Rabī‘atayn, Juban

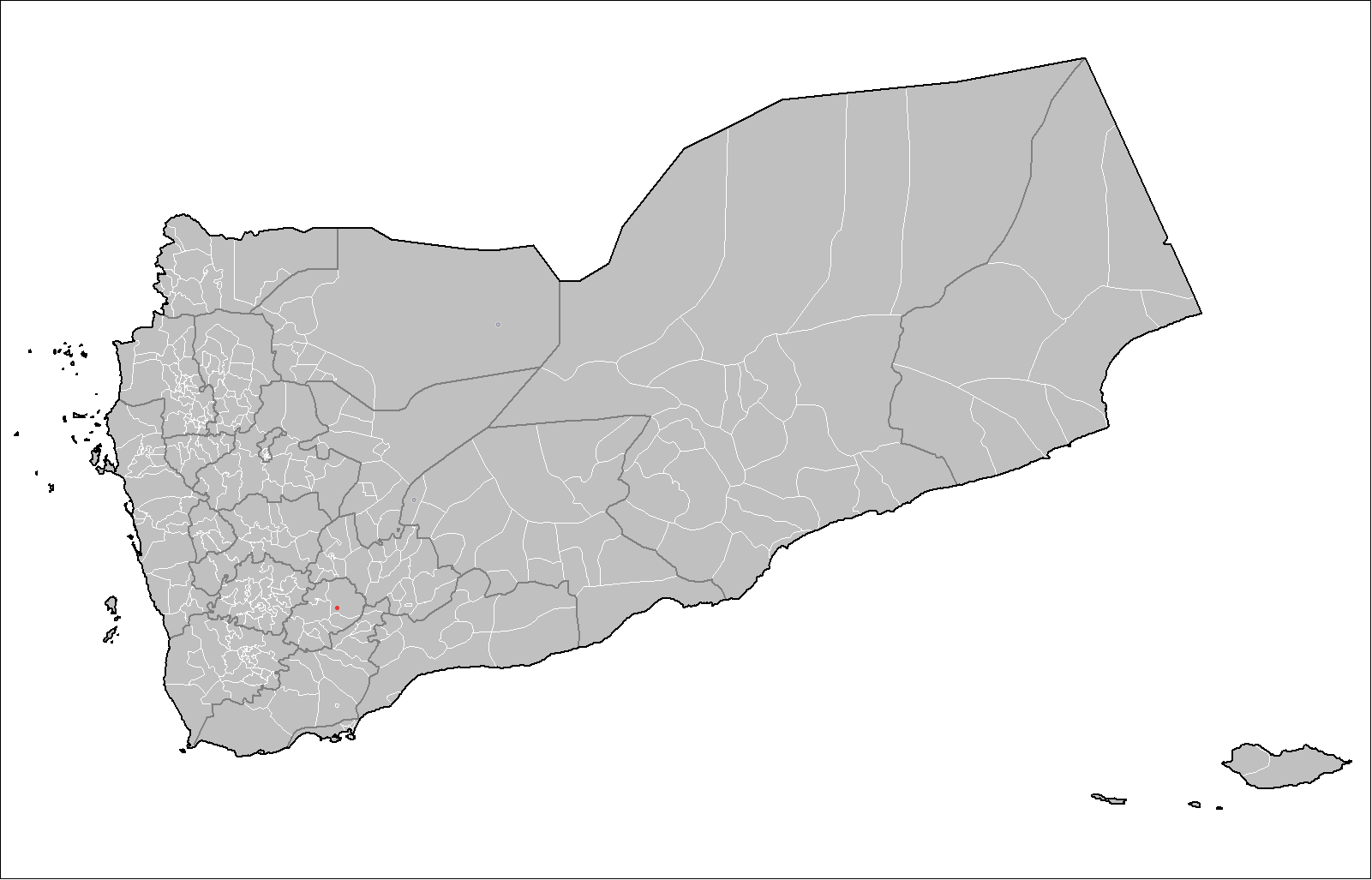
- Ar Rabī‘atayn, Juban, Ad Dhale
- Coordinates: 13°55'59.3"N 44°53'28.6"E
- Country: Yemen
- Governorate: Dhale
- District: Juban
- Elevation: 2,199 m (7,215 ft)

Population (2004)
  - Total: 6,978
- Time zone: UTC+3 (Yemen Standard Time)

Ar Rabīʻatayn is a sub-district of Juban, Yemen of the Dhale Governorate. As of 2004, Ar Rabī‘atayn had a population of 6,978 inhabitants.

== Houses ==
There are at least a few thousand houses located within Ar Rabī‘atayn.
