= Al-Hadi Izz al-Din =

Imam of the Zaidi state in Yemen (1441–1495)

Al-Hadi Izz ad-Din (1441 – April 18, 1495) was an imam of the Zaidi state in Yemen, who held the imamate in 1474–1495 in rivalry with other claimants.

Izz ad-Din bin al-Hasan bin Ali was a grandson of the counter-imam al-Hadi Ali (d. 1432) and a seventh-generation descendant of imam al-Hadi Yahya (d. 1239). He proclaimed his da'wa (call for the imamate) in 1474, after the death of the former imam al-Mutawakkil al-Mutahhar. He was considered a forceful leader who revived some of the power of the Zaydiyyah imamate. He was also a man of learning. Among his works were a text about how to prepare for afterlife, and a treatise on manumission of slaves as compensation for received injuries. Nevertheless, he had to contend with a number of other rivals for the title: an-Nasir Muhammad (d. 1488), al-Mansur Muhammad (d. 1505) and al-Mu’ayyad Muhammad (d. 1503). At his death, he was buried in Rughafa. He sired eight sons, called an-Nasir al-Hasan, al-Husayn, Ahmad, al-Mahdi, Abdallah, Salah, Abdallah Junior, and Salah Junior. Of these, an-Nasir al-Hasan then claimed the imamate.

== See also ==
- Imams of Yemen
- Rassids

Preceded by al-Mutawakkil al-Mutahhar	Zaydi Imam of Yemen; 1474–1495	Succeeded by an-Nasir al-Hasan
