= Qa'atabah district =

Qa'atabah District مديرية قعطبة
- District
- Location of Qa'atabah District in Yemen
- Coordinates: 13.85°N 44.70°E
- Country: Yemen
- Governorate: Dhale

Area
  - Total: 681 km^{2} (263 sq mi)

Population (2003)
  - Total: 91,206
- Time zone: UTC+3 (Yemen Standard Time)

Qa'atabah District (Arabic: مديرية قعطبة, romanized: Qāʿaṭabah) is a district of the Dhale Governorate, Yemen. As of 2003, the district had a population of 91,206 inhabitants.
