= Al Husha district =

Al Husha District
- District
- Location in Yemen
- Coordinates: 13°45′N 44°35′E
- Country: Yemen
- Governorate: Dhale

Population (2003)
  - Total: 60,178
- Time zone: UTC+3 (Yemen Standard Time)

Al Husha District is a district of the Dhale Governorate, Yemen. As of 2003, the district had a population of 60,178 inhabitants.
