= Damt district =

Coordinates: 13°58′N 44°45′E

Damt District
- District
- Interactive map of Damt District
- Country: Yemen
- Governorate: Dhale

Population (2003)
  - Total: 60,944
- Time zone: UTC+3 (Yemen Standard Time)

Damt District is a district of the Dhale Governorate, Yemen. As of 2003, the district had a population of 60,944 inhabitants.
