= Al Azariq district =

- District
- Location in Yemen
- Coordinates: 13°38′48″N 44°38′13″E
- Country: Yemen
- Governorate: Dhale

Population (2003)
  - Total: 37,295
- Time zone: UTC+3 (Yemen Standard Time)

Al Azariq district is a district of the Dhale Governorate, Yemen. As of 2003, the district had a population of 37,295 inhabitants.
