= Siege of Aden (1513) =

1513 Portuguese siege in Yemen

Coordinates: 12°46′47″N 45°2′57″E

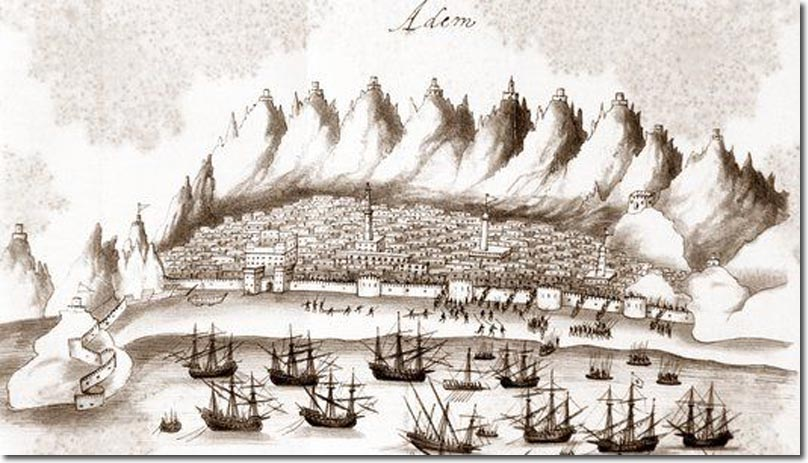
- Assault on Aden in 1513, by Gaspar Correia
Date	26 March 1513
Location	Aden, Tahirid Yemen
Result	Tahirid victory

Belligerents
Portuguese Empire; Portuguese India	Tahirid Sultanate

Commanders and leaders
Afonso de Albuquerque	Amîr Morjan

Strength
20 ships 1,700 Portuguese; 800 Malabar natives	Unknown

Casualties and losses
100 or 200 killed	50 killed 39 pieces of ordnance captured

The siege of Aden occurred when the Portuguese Governor of India, Afonso de Albuquerque, launched an unsuccessful expedition to capture Aden on 26 March 1513.

== Background ==
Aden was an independent city-state whose strategic location allowed it to control the entrance of the Red Sea. It became a wealthy trading area due to its location at the crossroads of busy trade routes into the Red Sea. Albuquerque's plan to capture Aden would allow him to dominate the Red Sea and strike a military blow at Mamluk Egypt. Aden was one of four strategic places that Albuquerque wanted to capture: Aden – to control the straits of Mecca (Red Sea); Hormuz – to control the straits of Basra (the Persian Gulf); and Diu and Goa – to ensure sovereignty of all the other districts of India.

== Siege ==
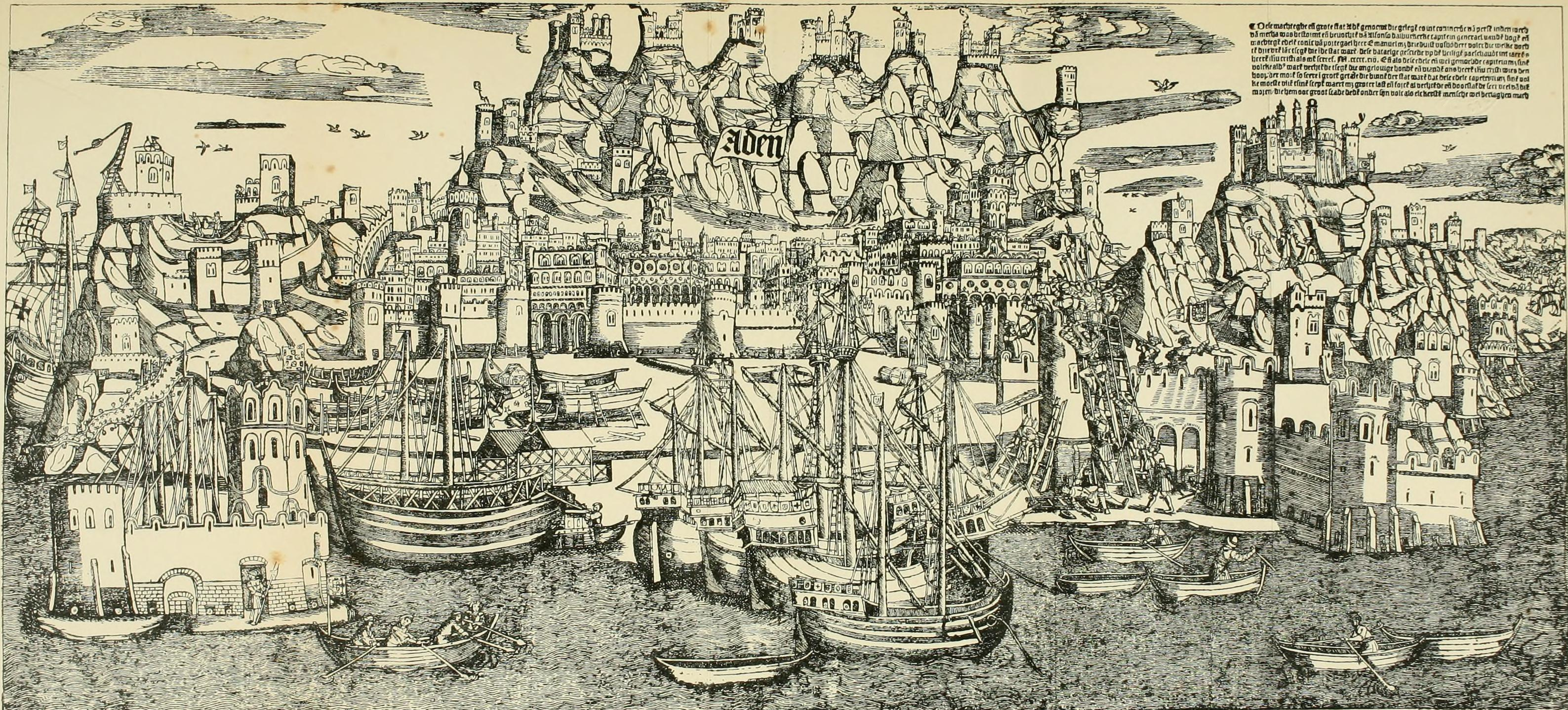
Attempted escalade of Aden in 1513

Albuquerque's fleet sailed from Goa, India, on 18 February 1513, and consisted of 20 ships manned by 1,700 Portuguese and 800 allied natives of Malabar. The fleet arrived at Socotra Island. The captains deliberated on how to approach Aden. Some of Albuquerque's chiefs suggested an attempt at negotiated surrender while others pressed for an immediate attack. Albuquerque chose the latter option, believing that negotiations would give the inhabitants time to strengthen their defences or obtain reinforcements from elsewhere. Before dawn on Easter Sunday (26 March), the Portuguese commandeered some landing barges in the harbour, ferried their men ashore, and began their siege on Aden. They captured an outwork, where many defenders were slain and 39 pieces of ordnance were captured. However, they were later repulsed and suffered high casualties. The overall attack failed, with the scaling ladders collapsing under the weight of the men trying to mount them. This left some of the Portuguese trapped in isolation atop the wall. According to Albuquerque's biographer son, the attack was abandoned after all their scaling ladders broke. By midday, Albuquerque and his men withdrew to their ships. After plundering and burning the vessels in the harbour, and cannonading the town, the fleet sailed towards the Red Sea.

== Aftermath ==
Albuquerque stated: "I think that if I had reconnoitred Aden first, I would not have launched our attack where I did." The failure to capture Aden significantly undermined his strategy. Without a base of operations at the mouth of the Red Sea, it was impossible for the Portuguese to prevent spices being shipped to Egypt and the Mediterranean by the traditional route. The Crown's ability to enforce a trade monopoly in the Indian Ocean had been fatally damaged. Alarmed by the Portuguese threat, the Mamluks occupied the Yemeni Tihamah and attempted to capture Aden but failed. The Portuguese launched a second attack but also failed. Aden finally fell in 1538 to Suleiman Pasha, the commander of a large Ottoman fleet. Under Ottoman control, Aden was valued primarily as a barrier to European penetration of the holy cities rather than as an entrepôt for trade.
