= Halimayn district =

Halimayn District
- District
- Location within Yemen
- Coordinates: 15°33′N 45°00′E
- Country: Yemen
- Governorate: Lahij

Population (2003)
  - Total: 27,871
- Time zone: UTC+3 (Yemen Standard Time)

Halimayn District is a district of the Lahij Governorate, Yemen. As of 2003, the district had a population of 27,871 inhabitants.
