= People's Vanguard Party (Yemen) =

People's Vanguard Party حزب الطليعة الشعبية (Arabic)
- Abbreviation: PVP
- Leader: Anis Hasan Yahya
- Founded: 1971 in North Yemen and April 1974 in South Yemen
- Dissolved: 14 October 1975
- Merged into: Yemeni Socialist Party
- Headquarters: Aden, South Yemen
- Ideology: Neo-Ba'athism
- International affiliation: Syrian-led Ba'ath Party

The People's Vanguard Party (Arabic: حزب الطليعة الشعبية), also referred to as at-Tali'a, was a Ba'athist political party in Yemen. The party was established in the late 1950s. It was the Yemeni branch of the Baath Party. When the Baath Party was divided between Syrian and Iraqi factions, the Yemeni branch overwhelmingly sided with the Syrian-led Ba'ath Party. After the split, the Syrian-aligned Ba'athists 'Yemenized' their party and took the name People's Vanguard Party.

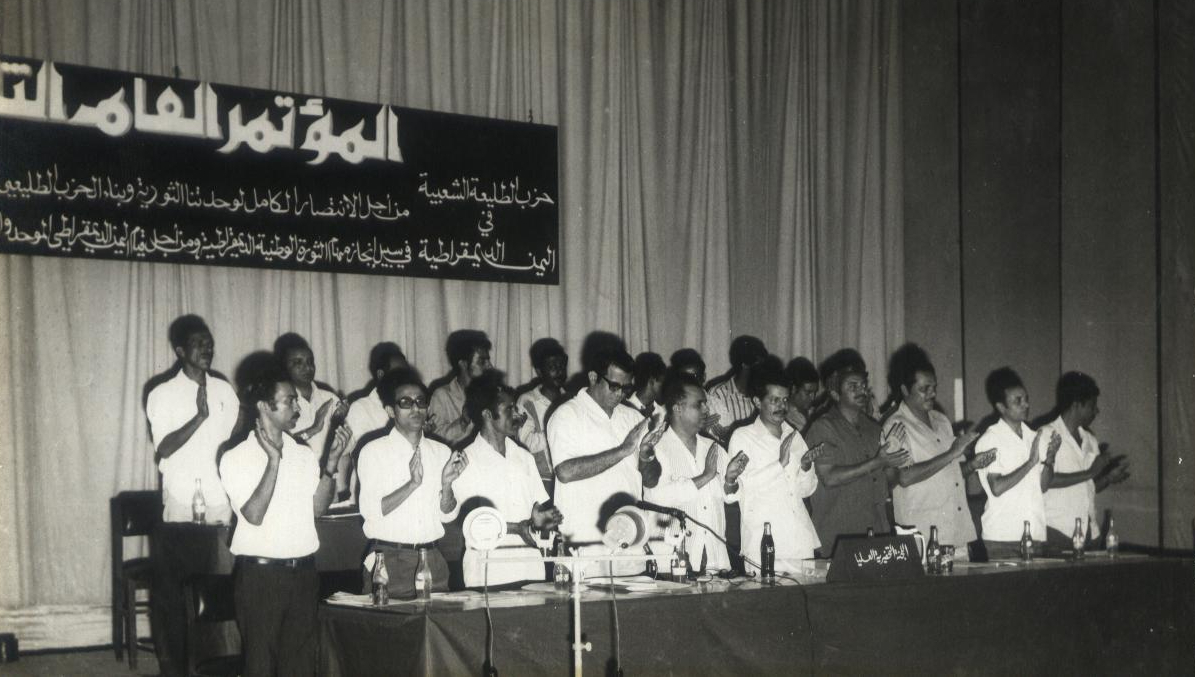
The Third Conference of the People's Vanguard Party

The members of the party were largely recruited from teachers, students, and intellectuals. The party was based in Aden, and had limited presence outside the city. It had some presence in Hadhramaut for a brief period. The party was banned in North Yemen, where it was part of the National Democratic Front and took part in the NDF Rebellion.

The party was one of two non-National Front (NF) parties tolerated during the early 1970s. In October 1975 it joined the NF-dominated United Political Organization of the National Front (which evolved into the Yemeni Socialist Party in 1978). The merger was ratified by the third PVP congress held in August 1975.

== See also ==
- List of political parties in Yemen
- Anis Hasan Yahya
