= Al-Mansur Muhammad (died 1505) =

Al-Mansur Muhammad (1441 – March 4, 1505) was a Zaydi imam of Yemen who ruled in 1475–1504, in rivalry with other claimants for the imamate.

== Zaydi disunity ==
Muhammad bin Ali as-Siraji al-Washali was one of the three Sayyids who claimed the Yemeni imamate after the death of al-Mutawakkil al-Mutahhar in Dhamar in 1474. He was a seventh-generation descendant of the imam Yahya bin Muhammad as-Siraji (d. 1296). He took the honorific title al-Mansur Muhammad. The two other claimants were al-Hadi Izz ad-din (d. 1495) and an-Nasir Muhammad (d. 1488). A fourth imam, al-Mu'ayyad Muhammad posed as lord of Sanaa (Sahib Sanaa) since 1464. Al-Mansur Muhammad was thus only one of several leaders in the Zaydi lands of highland Yemen. At this time, the Sunni Tahiride dynasty ruled from Zabid and Taiz in the lowland and southern highland. The Tahiride sultans did not attempt to expand to the north after 1465, and their relations with the Zaydi imams oscillated between tolerance and enmity. A preserved text outlines the political situation in the Zaydi territory around 1500. Al-Mu'ayyad Muhammad ruled Sanaa and the surrounding districts; the Kawkaban area stood under the sons of the old imam al-Mutawakkil al-Mutahhar; and the traditional Zaydi centre Saada and its districts were divided between al-Mansur Muhammad and two other families.

== Defeats against the Tahirides ==
Al-Mansur Muhammad attacked Tahiride positions between Dhamar and Sanaa in 1496 and 1498. On the latter occasion the imam's forces were completely routed. After the death of al-Mu'ayyad Muhammad bin an-Nasir in 1503, Sanaa was dominated by a certain Sharib. In the next year, the Tahiride Sultan Amir attacked the city. Al-Mansur Muhammad hastened down to relieve the defenders of Sanaa, but he fell in the hands of Sultan Amir. The Tahirides entered Sanaa and a reign of terror ensued. The captured imam was poisoned in prison in Sanaa three months later. The Tahiride triumph was just temporary. Two years later the Zaydi imamate was continued in the person of al-Mutawakkil Yahya Sharaf ad-Din, who managed to unite large parts of Yemen under his authority.

== See also ==
- Rassids
- History of Yemen

Preceded by al-Mutawakkil al-Mutahhar	Zaydi Imam of Yemen; 1475–1504	Succeeded by al-Mutawakkil Yahya Sharaf ad-Din
