= Juban district =

Coordinates: 13°58′N 44°55′E

Juban District جبن
- District
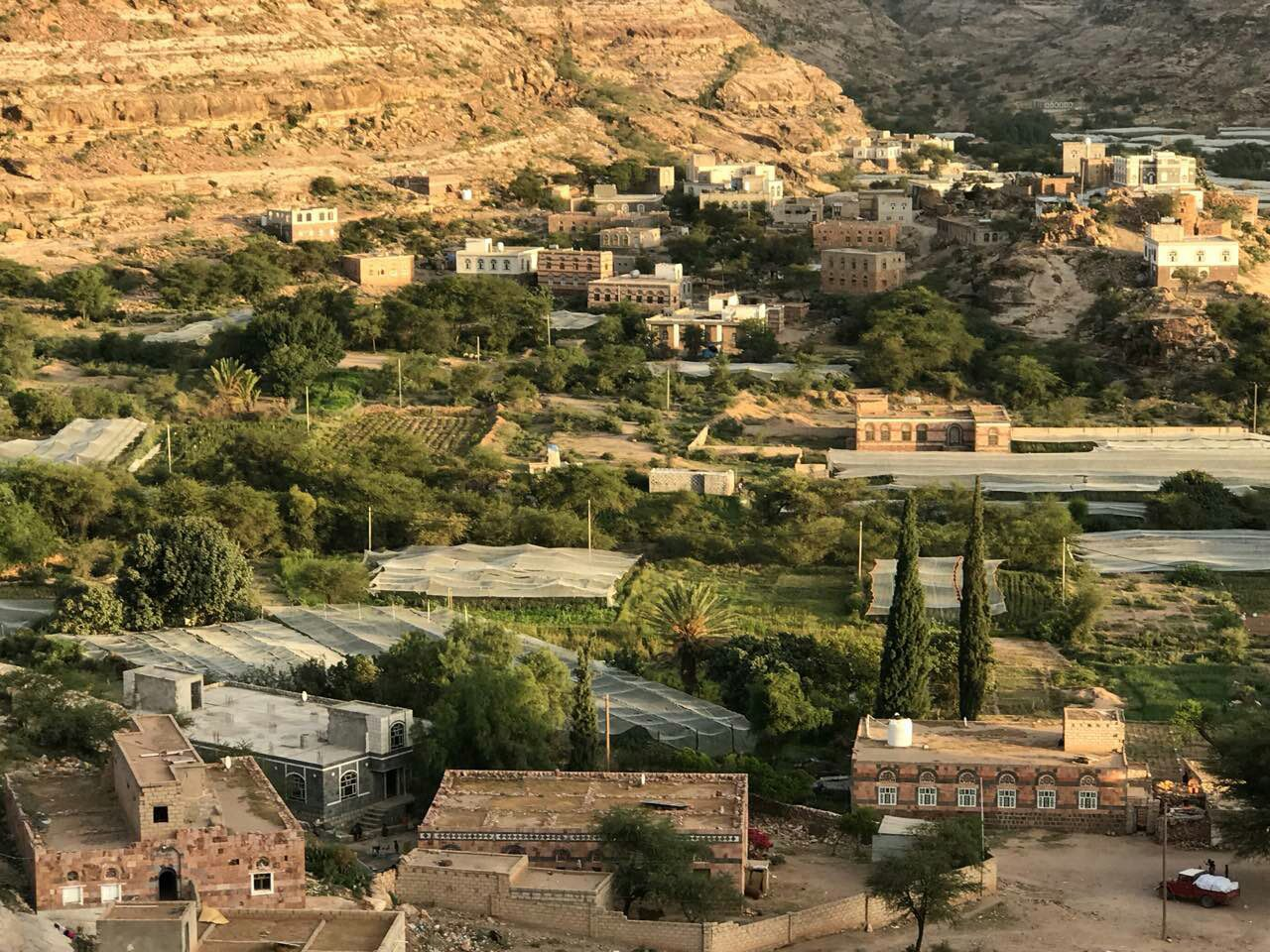
- The City Juban

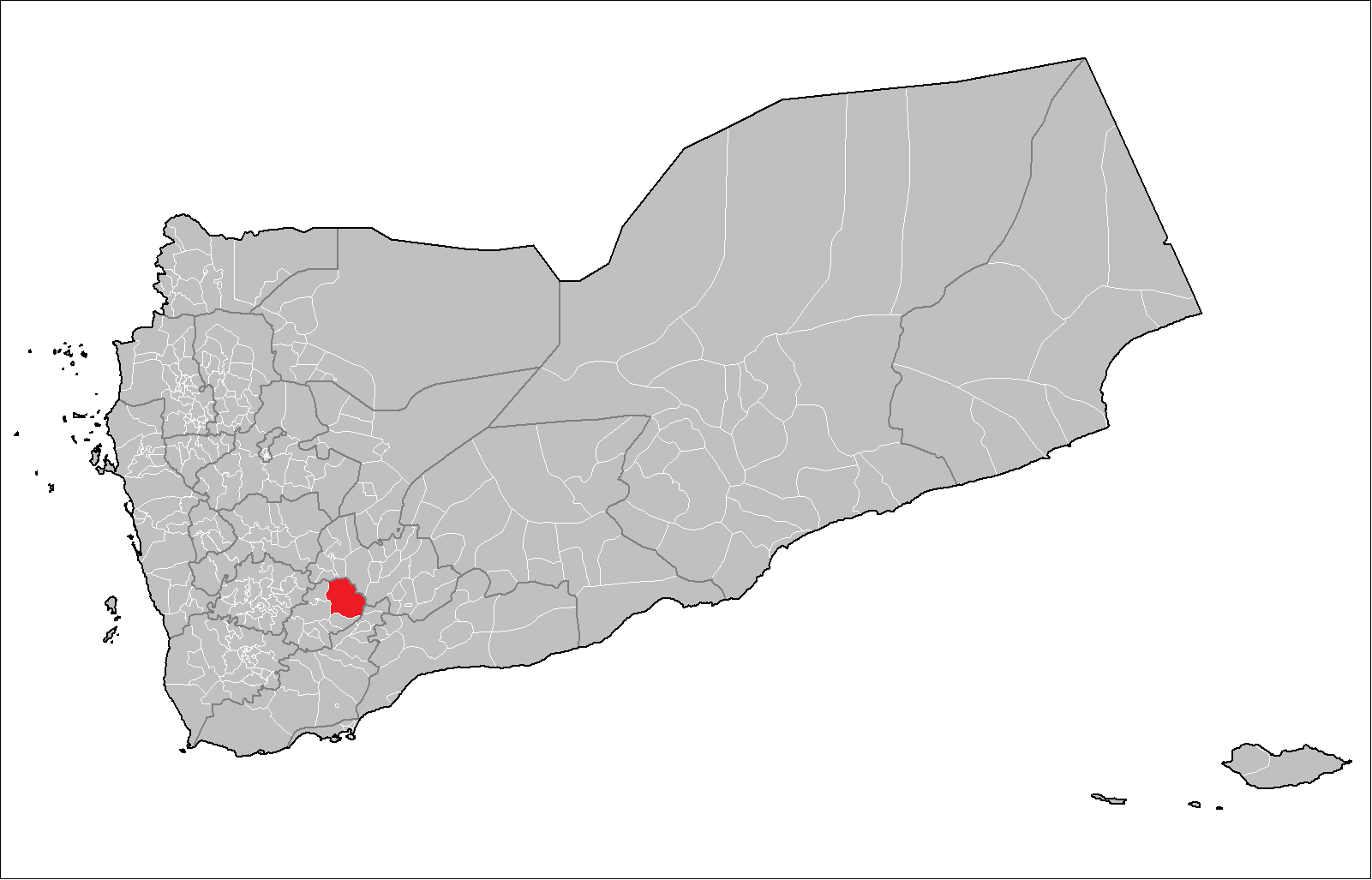
- Juban, Ad Dhale
- Coordinates: 14° 0' 27.8742", 44° 51' 50.691"
- Country: Yemen
- Governorate: Dhale
- Elevation: 1,910 m (6,270 ft)

Population (2015)
  - Total: 73,960
- Time zone: UTC+3 (Yemen Standard Time)

Juban District is a district of the Dhale Governorate, Yemen. As of 2015, the district had a population of 73,960 inhabitants.

== Sub-Districts ==
There are at least 78 sub-district entities located within the Juban District, Yemen.

Name	Geolocation
Ad Dawār	
Aḑ Ḑuwayhirah	
Al Ghaymān	
Al Ghufarah	
Al Ḩalaqah	
Al Ḩammām	
Al Hanakah	
Al Ḩişn	
Al Jabūrīyah	
Al Jahrah	
Al Jalb	
Al Jibil	
Al Kahar	
Al Khāniq	
Al Khuḑayrīyah	
Al Khulīyah	
Al Lawayn	
Al Liwwāh	
Al Lumayḩīyah	
Al Mafrūr	
Al Maḩjar	
Al Malaḩāt	
Al Maqrānah	
Al Mi‘rab	
Al Muşayni‘ah	
Al Nā‘im	
Al Qaḩālil	
Al Qaltayn	
Al Qaryah	
Al Qawārī	
Al Qaynah	
Al Qurayn	
Al Raḑā‘ī	
Al Widyān	
Al Yaḩmūm	
Al ‘Aqr	
Al ‘Awābil	
An Najd	
Ar Rabī‘atayn / الربيعتين	13°56'1.25" N, 44°53'26.38" E
Ar Razā’im	
Ar Rubāt	13° 56' 50" N, 44° 53' 30" E
Arish	
As Salāmah	
As Sukarah	
Banī Qays	
Bukhaytah	
Dār al Ḩāj	
Ḑayq al Balas	
Ḑayq Rawbān	
Dhakhar	
Ghābat Mashya‘	
Ḩabābah	
Ḩajāj / حجاج	14°8'45.17" N, 44°52'39.43" E
Ḩammat Khalaqah	
Ḩamrī	
Ḩanjar	
Ḩawrah	
Ḩişn Ramam	
Huwwah	
Jabūb Khawlah	
Jabūbah	
Jarf al Qāḑī	
Juban	
Kharābah	
Kilḩ	
Maḩall al Jibil	
Mashwak	
Ma‘thah	
Misaykah	
Nawbat Ḩunayn	
Na'wah / نعوة	13°58'14.20" N, 44°51'13.72" E
Rakhyah	
Ra‘sah	
Shi‘b al Bidah	
Shubā‘ah	
Thiyāb	
Yahar	
