= Anis Hassan Yahya =

Yemeni politician (1934–2026)

- أنيس حسن يحيى

General Secretary of the People's Vanguard Party
- In office April 1974 – 14 October 1975
- Preceded by: Position established
- Succeeded by: Position abolished

Personal details
- Born: 20 December 1934 Crater, Aden Protectorate
- Died: 31 May 2026 (aged 91) Cairo, Egypt
- Party: People's Vanguard Party (formerly)

Anis Hassan Yahya (Arabic: أنيس حسن يحيى; 20 December 1934 – 31 May 2026) was a Yemeni politician who served as the General Secretary of the People's Vanguard Party in former South Yemen (officially the People's Democratic Republic of Yemen).

== Life and career ==
Born in Aden's Crater district in 1934, he studied business in Cairo University in Egypt, graduating with a bachelor's degree in 1963. Upon returning to Aden, he worked as a high school teacher in Khormaksar District in Aden, before becoming involved in local politics.

A Ba'athist, Yahya was the leader of the Vanguard Party, which in 1975 merged to create the Yemeni Socialist Party (YSP). During the South Yemen Civil War in 1986, he aligned with Ali Nasir Muhammad's faction of the YSP, which was defeated.

In 2002, the Yemen Times reported that Yahya would be permitted to return to Yemen from his exile in the United Arab Emirates, as part of an amnesty of YSP leaders convicted after the 1994 civil war.

Yahya died in Cairo, Egypt on 31 May 2026, at the age of 91. He had been living there since the 2010s.
