= Al-Mutawakkil al-Mutahhar =

Imam of the Zaydi state in Yemen

Al-Mutawakkil Ali al-Mutahhar (Arabic: المطهر بن محمد) was an iman of Yemen from Sanaa who reigned from 1436 to 1474. He belonged to the Qasimid family who were descendants Muhammad, He ruled by the Quran and the Sunnah and he left a number of writings on Hadith including poetry praising Mohammad.

== Rivalry for the imamate ==
Al-Mutahhar bin Muhammad was no immediate relative of the family that had provided imams for the last three generations. He was a descendant of the grand organizer of Zaydi Islam, al-Qasim ar-Rassi (d. 860), in the 14th degree. When the old imam al-Mansur Ali died of the plague that ravaged Yemen in 1436, he was one of three candidates who brought forward their da'wa (call for the imamate). He took the honorific title al-Mutawakkil al-Mutahhar. The two other claimants were al-Mahdi Salah ad-Din (d. 1445) and al-Mansur an-Nasir (d. 1462). Of these, al-Mansur initially became the dominant, and imprisoned his two rivals. While al-Mahdi died in captivity, al-Mutawakkil was released by his captor after some time. In spite of the internal political disunity, the Zaydi community was relatively safe for incursions from the Sunni lowland of Yemen. The once powerful Rasulid Dynasty declined rapidly and collapsed altogether in 1442–1454. A new lowland power, the Tahiride Dynasty, took over in 1454. They did what they could to discomfort the Zaydi state from the beginning.

== Territorial losses ==
After some skirmishing, the Tahiride Sultan Ali temporarily took Dhamar in 1460. In the following year, Ali managed to seize Sanaa with the help of a Zaydi rebel, expelling al-Mutawakkil from the city. A son of the imam was set up as fief-holder, exerting power together with the Tahiride governor al-Ba'dani. However, already in 1464 Sanaa was taken by strategy by the rival imam al-Mu'ayyad Muhammad who held the city until his demise in 1503. Al-Mutawakkil al-Mutahhar died in Dhamar in 1474, and his position was claimed by three would-be imams, further increasing the complicated political picture in the Zaydi lands. Al-Mutawakkil left a number of writings, poems praising Muhammad and answers to legal questions. His grandson Yahya bin al-Mukhtar bin al-Mutahhar was emir of Taiz under the Tahiride Sultan Amir.

== See also ==
- Rassids

Preceded by al-Mansur Ali bin Salah ad-Din	Zaydi Imam of Yemen; 1436–1474	Succeeded by an-Nasir Muhammad bin Yusuf, Al-Hadi Izz al-Din, and al-Mansur Muhammad
