= South Yemeni crisis =

1986 failed coup d'etat and armed conflict

South Yemen crisis
- Part of the Cold war, and Arab Cold War
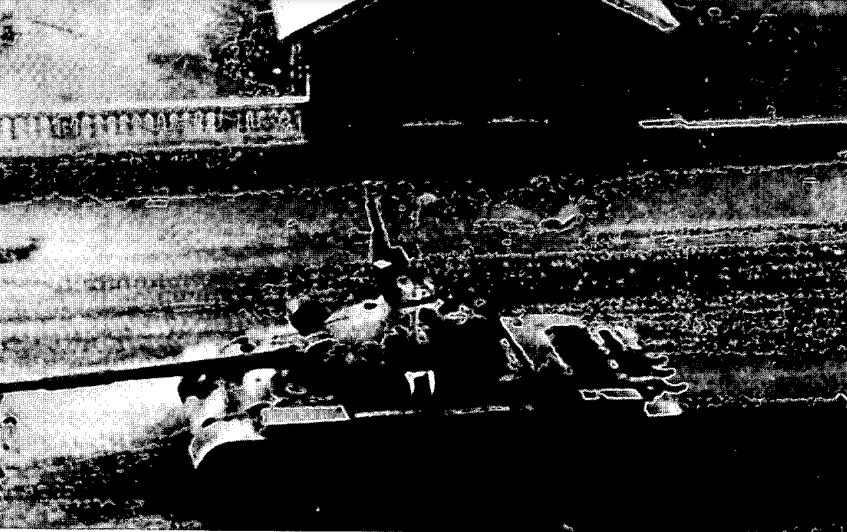
- A T-62 tank in the streets of Aden during the South Yemeni crisis
| Date | 13 – 24 January 1986 (1 week and 4 days) |
| Location | South Yemen |
| Result | al-Toghmah faction victory: Defeat of al-Zomrah faction and their exile to the Yemen Arab Republic; Death of Abdul Fattah Ismail, Ali Antar, Saleh Moslih Qassem, and Ali Shayi'; Assumption of power by Ali Salem al Beidh and Haidar Abu Bakr al-Attas |

Belligerents
| al-Zomrah faction of the Yemeni Socialist Party | al-Toghmah faction of the Yemeni Socialist Party |

Commanders and leaders
| Ali Nasir Muhammad; President | (South Yemen) Abdul Fattah Ismail †; Former President; (South Yemen) Ali Antar X; Vice President; (South Yemen) Saleh Muslih Qassem X; Defense Minister; (South Yemen) Haidar Abu Bakr al-Attas; Prime Minister; Ali Salem al Beidh; YSP Politburo member |

Units involved
| Shabwah and Abyan Mobilized tribal militias; South Yemeni Navy; South Yemeni Air Force | Dhale and Lahij Mobilized tribal militias; Northern NDF militants; South Yemeni tank corps |

Casualties and losses
- 4,000 – 6,000 dead 60,000 refugees

The South Yemeni crisis, colloquially referred to in Yemen as the events of '86, (Note: or as the events of January 13, or simply as the events) was a failed coup d'etat and brief civil war which took place on January 13, 1986, in South Yemen. The civil war developed as a result of ideological differences, and later tribal tensions, between two factions of the ruling Yemeni Socialist Party (YSP), centred on Abdul Fattah Ismail's faction, at-Toghmah, and Ali Nasir Muhammad's faction, az-Zomrah, for the leadership of the YSP and South Yemen. The conflict quickly escalated into a costly civil war that lasted eleven days and resulted in thousands of casualties. Additionally, the conflict resulted in the demise of much of the Yemeni Socialist Party's most experienced socialist leadership cadre, contributing to a much weaker government and the country's eventual unification with North Yemen in 1990.

== Background ==
Following the end of the Aden Emergency and the achievement of South Yemeni independence in 1967, the National Liberation Front (NLF) was handed power over the country following negotiations in Geneva with the British government. A broadly left-wing nationalist insurgent organization, the NLF had sought to unite the forces of the Aden petroleum and port workers' trade unions, Nasserites, and Communists. The last of these factions was led by Abdul Fattah Ismail, a founding member of the NLF and its chief Marxist ideologue. During the Emergency, Ismail had led the armed cadres of the NLF in Aden, and was supported by many of the insurgents who had seen action against the British. In 1969, with support from the Soviet Union, Ismail used this popularity among the nascent South Yemeni army to seize control of the NLF, and in June he was declared its General Secretary.

Ismail pursued aggressive and revolutionary domestic and foreign policies. At home, the People's Democratic Republic of Yemen adopted a Marxist-Leninist scientific socialism as the official state ideology. All major industries were nationalized and collectivized, universal suffrage was implemented, and a quasi-cult of personality was developed around Ismail and the NLF, renamed the Yemeni Socialist Party in 1978. His government helped establish Marxist paramilitary organizations around the Arabian Peninsula, PFLOAG and PFLO, which used political activism and violence to campaign against the Western-aligned Arab monarchies on the Persian Gulf. Under Ismail, South Yemen gave its most direct support to the later of these two groups during the Dhofar Rebellion in neighbouring Oman, providing advisors to the insurgent forces there, in addition to ensuring the transit of Warsaw Pact and Chinese weapons to the rebels. He also encouraged Communist guerrillas in North Yemen, seeking to destabilize the Northern regime and bring about Yemeni unification under a Communist government based in the South. This antagonism toward the North would stoke tensions between the two Yemens, eventually culminating in a brief series of border skirmishes in 1972.

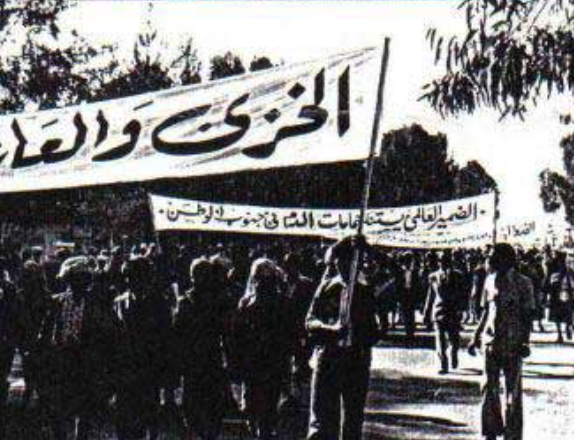
Anti-war demonstration in the Yemen Arab Republic by southerner refugees

Following the failure of the insurgency in Oman in 1978 and simmering hostilities with North Yemen including the Yemenite War of 1979, Ismail had lost favour with conservative elements of the Yemeni Socialist Party and alienated his country from much of the region and the West. The Soviet Union, upon which South Yemen relied for the vast majority of its trade and financial aid, had also lost confidence in the General Secretary, policymakers within the Brezhnev administration regarding him as a loose cannon and a liability. As a result, Moscow began to encourage moderates within the YSP to remove him from power. In 1980, believing that his political rivals within the YSP were preparing to assassinate him, Ismail resigned and went into exile. His successor, Ali Nasir Muhammad, took a less interventionist stance toward both North Yemen and neighbouring Oman. The Yemeni Socialist Party was increasingly polarised between Ismail's supporters, who espoused a hard-line leftist ideology, and those of Ali Nasir Muhammad who espoused more pragmatic domestic policies and friendlier relations with other Arab states and the West.

The Soviet Union attempted to play a mediating role from its naval base in Yemen which hosted 1,000-1,800 troops in 1986.

In June 1985, the YSP politburo adopted a resolution stating that anyone who resorted to violence in settling internal political disputes is considered a criminal and a betrayer of the homeland.

== War ==
Ali Nasir Muhammad announcing the deaths of the leaders of al-Toghmah faction

In 13 January 1986, The Socialist Party split into two factions: al-Toghmah, loyal to Abdel Fattah Ismail, and al-Zomrah, loyal to Ali Nasir Muhammad. On January 13, 1986, bodyguards of Ali Nasir Muhammad opened fire on members of the Yemeni Socialist Party politburo as the body was due to meet. As most politburo members were armed and had their bodyguards, a firefight broke out. Ali Nasir's supporters were not in the meeting room at the time. Vice-president Ali Ahmad Nasir Antar, Defense minister Saleh Muslih Qassem, and the YSP disciplinary chief Ali Shayi' Hadi were killed in the shootout. Abdul Fattah Ismail survived the attack and tried to escape through a tank, but was killed later on that day as naval forces loyal to Ali Nasir shelled the tank. Already on the first day of clashes, about 3,800 people died.

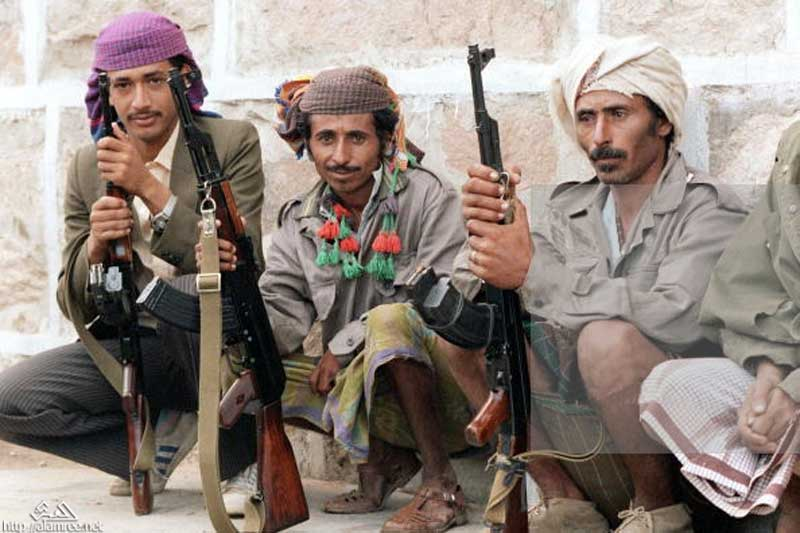
YSP militants during the war.

Fighting lasted for 12 days and resulted in thousands of casualties, the ouster of Ali Nasir, and the deaths of Abdul Fattah Ismail, Ali Antar, Saleh Muslih, and Ali Shayi'. Some 60,000 people, including Ali Nasir and his brigade, fled to the Yemen Arab Republic. In the conflict that took the lives of anywhere from 4,000 to 6,000 people, Ali Salem al Beidh was one of the few high-ranking officials of Abdul Fattah's faction on the winning side who survived.

== Aftermath ==
=== Succession ===
A former Politburo member, al-Beidh took the top position in the YSP following a 12-day 1986 civil war between forces loyal to former chairman Abdul Fattah Ismail and then-chairman Ali Nasir Muhammad. An Ismail ally, he took control after Mohammad's defeat, defection, and Ismail's death.

=== Unification and civil war ===
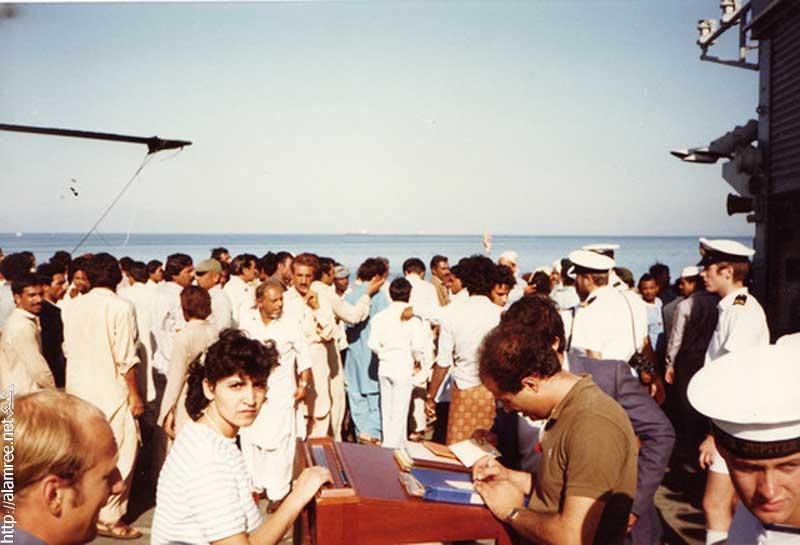
South Yemeni refugees.

Suffering a loss of more than half its aid from the Soviet Union from 1986 to 1989, and an interest in possible oil reserves on the border between the countries, al-Beidh's government worked toward unification with North Yemen officials.

Efforts toward unification proceeded from 1988. Although the PDRY and the YAR governments declared that they approved a future union in 1972, little progress was made toward unification, and relations were often strained.

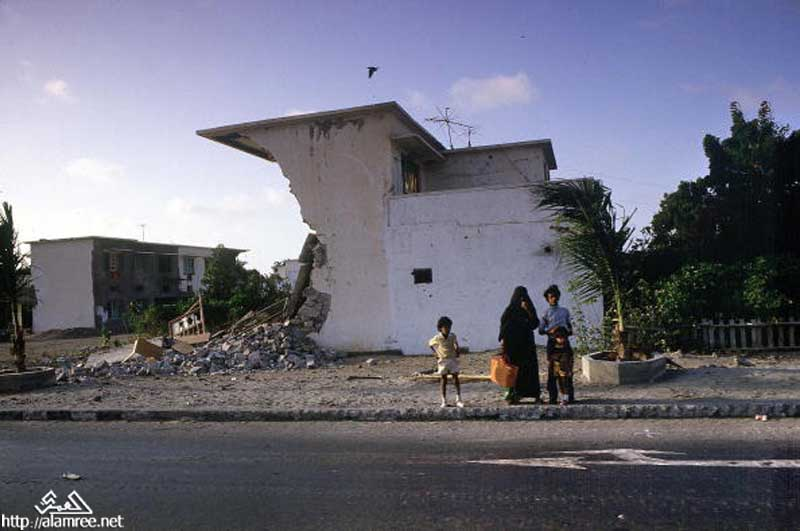
A building damaged by the fighting in Aden.

In 1990, North Yemen and South Yemen united into one country, but in February 1994, clashes between northern and southern forces started and quickly developed into a full-scale civil war. As northern forces advanced on Aden, al-Beidh declared the establishment of the Democratic Republic of Yemen on 21 May. The southern resistance however failed. Saleh enlisted Salafi and Jihadist forces to fight against Southern forces of the Yemeni Socialist Party. Forces loyal to Ali Nasir also took part. Northern forces entered Aden on 7 July, resulting in the sacking of the city.

== See also ==
- South Yemen Movement
- List of modern conflicts in the Middle East
