= Dhale =

Dhale الضالع
- Town
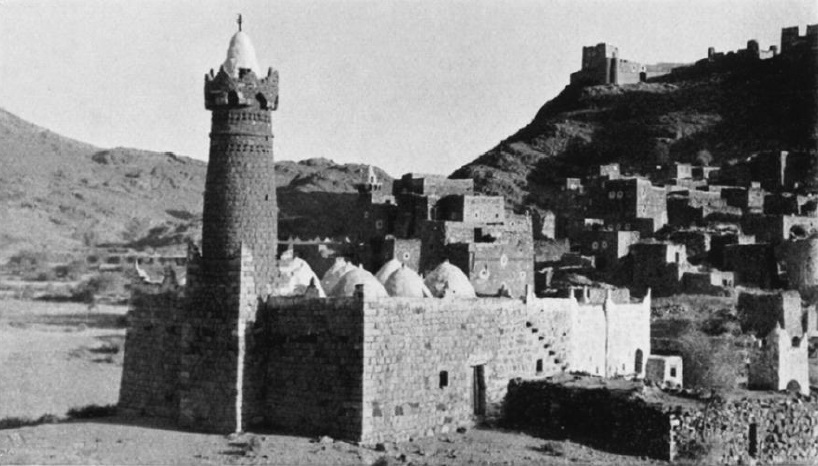
- Partial view of Dhala in 1937, with the main mosque in the foreground. Atop the hill is the castle where the hereditary Amir of Dhala resided. Dhala, 65 miles or 105 kilometres north of Aden, lies 4,800 feet or 1,460 metres above sea level. It was then one of the states of the Aden Protectorate, strategically located near the border of the Protectorate and what was then the Imamate (Kingdom) of Yemen

- Location in Yemen
- Coordinates: 13°41′48″N 44°43′51″E
- Country: Yemen
- Governorate: Dhale Governorate
- District: Dhale

Population (2004)
  - Total: 21,783
- Time zone: UTC+3 (Yemen Standard Time)

Dhale (Note: Also spelled Dali and Dhalea and sometimes prefixed with Al or Ad (Arabic: الضالع, romanized: Aḍ-Ḍāliʿ) is the capital town of Dhale Governorate in south-western Yemen. It is located at around 13°41′48″N 44°43′51″E, at an elevation of around 1500 metres.

== History ==
Formerly it was the capital of the Emirate of Dhala.

== Climate ==
Dhale has an altitude-moderated hot semi-arid climate (Köppen BSh) bordering upon the hot arid climate (BWh) found in most of the Arabian Peninsula. Afternoon weather ranges from very warm in winter to hot in summer, whilst mornings range from cool in winter to warm in summer. Rainfall averages around 360 millimetres or 14 inches per year, of which over half occurs in July and August alone due to the influence of the northern edge of the monsoon.

Climate data for Dhale
Month	Jan	Feb	Mar	Apr	May	Jun	Jul	Aug	Sep	Oct	Nov	Dec	Year
Mean daily maximum °C (°F)	24.5 (76.1)	24.7 (76.5)	26.8 (80.2)	28.6 (83.5)	31.5 (88.7)	33.1 (91.6)	32.6 (90.7)	30.6 (87.1)	30.2 (86.4)	30.0 (86.0)	27.2 (81.0)	24.8 (76.6)	28.7 (83.7)
Daily mean °C (°F)	17.4 (63.3)	18.0 (64.4)	19.8 (67.6)	21.7 (71.1)	24.3 (75.7)	25.9 (78.6)	25.5 (77.9)	23.8 (74.8)	23.2 (73.8)	21.7 (71.1)	20.0 (68.0)	17.6 (63.7)	21.6 (70.8)
Mean daily minimum °C (°F)	10.4 (50.7)	11.3 (52.3)	12.8 (55.0)	14.9 (58.8)	17.1 (62.8)	18.7 (65.7)	18.5 (65.3)	17.0 (62.6)	16.2 (61.2)	13.4 (56.1)	12.8 (55.0)	10.4 (50.7)	14.5 (58.0)
Average rainfall mm (inches)	11 (0.4)	8 (0.3)	11 (0.4)	20 (0.8)	43 (1.7)	16 (0.6)	90 (3.5)	103 (4.1)	44 (1.7)	8 (0.3)	6 (0.2)	0 (0)	360 (14)
Source: Climate-Data.org

== Economy ==
Historically, the Jewish community produced cotton thread.
