= Ash Shu'ayb district =

Coordinates: 13°50′N 44°50′E

Ash Shu'ayb District مديرية الشعيب Alshaib
- District
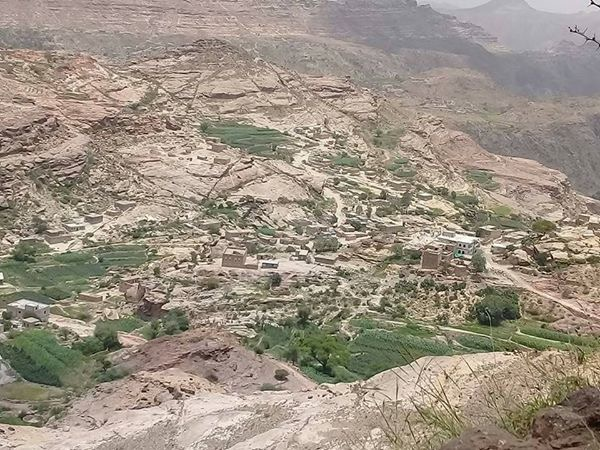

- Country: Yemen
- Governorate: Dhale

Area
  - Total: 338 km^{2} (131 sq mi)
- Elevation: 2,084 m (6,837 ft)

Population (2003)
  - Total: 38,261
- Time zone: UTC+3 (Yemen Standard Time)

Ash Shu'ayb District is a district of the Dhale Governorate, Yemen. As of 2003, the district had a population of 38,261 inhabitants.

== Location ==
Ash Shu'ayb district (Shuaib) is located between longitude (44.833) eastward, and latitude (13.83) northward. Al Shu'ayb is located on a plateau ranging from 3000 to 3,500 feet in the north-west of Aden. It is about 140 miles away, and the Shuaib (North) and North (West) The eastern side, the Dhale Governorate and the [Halimin Directorate] from the southern side. Among the most important villages: Al-Awabel (the capital of the Directorate), Al Madu, Hathara, Houf, Lasbour, Qazaah, Bakhael, Maklan, Rabat, Kahreeh, Jabbab, Ja'afer, Lnajud, lwdeeha, Gabel Kadapa, Raghb,salawan .

Al Shuaib Directorate enjoys a cool climate for its rise above sea level.

Notable mountains in the district include Hay'd Urshi, Jabal Harir and Jabal Khudr.
