= Yafrus =

Yafrus يفرس
- Sub-district
- Location in Yemen
- Coordinates: 13°27′22″N 43°56′32″E
- Country: Yemen
- Governorate: Taiz Governorate
- District: Jabal Habashi District
- Elevation: 1,310 m (4,300 ft)

Population (2004)
  - Total: 2,786
- Time zone: UTC+3

Yafrus (Arabic: يفرس) is a sub-district in Jabal Habashi District, Taiz Governorate, Yemen. Yafrus had a population of 2,786 at the 2004 census.
