= Al Hussein district =

Al Hussein District مديرية الحصين
- District
- Location in Yemen
- Coordinates: 13°50′N 44°45′E
- Country: Yemen
- Governorate: Dhale

Population (2003)
  - Total: 37,118
- Time zone: UTC+3 (Yemen Standard Time)

Al Hussein District (Arabic: مديرية الحصين) is a district of the Dhale Governorate, Yemen. As of 2003, the district had a population of 37,118 inhabitants.
