= Tahirid Sultanate =

Former Yemeni Muslim dynasty (1454–1517)

Tahirid Sultanate الدولة الطاهرية (Arabic)
- 1454–1517
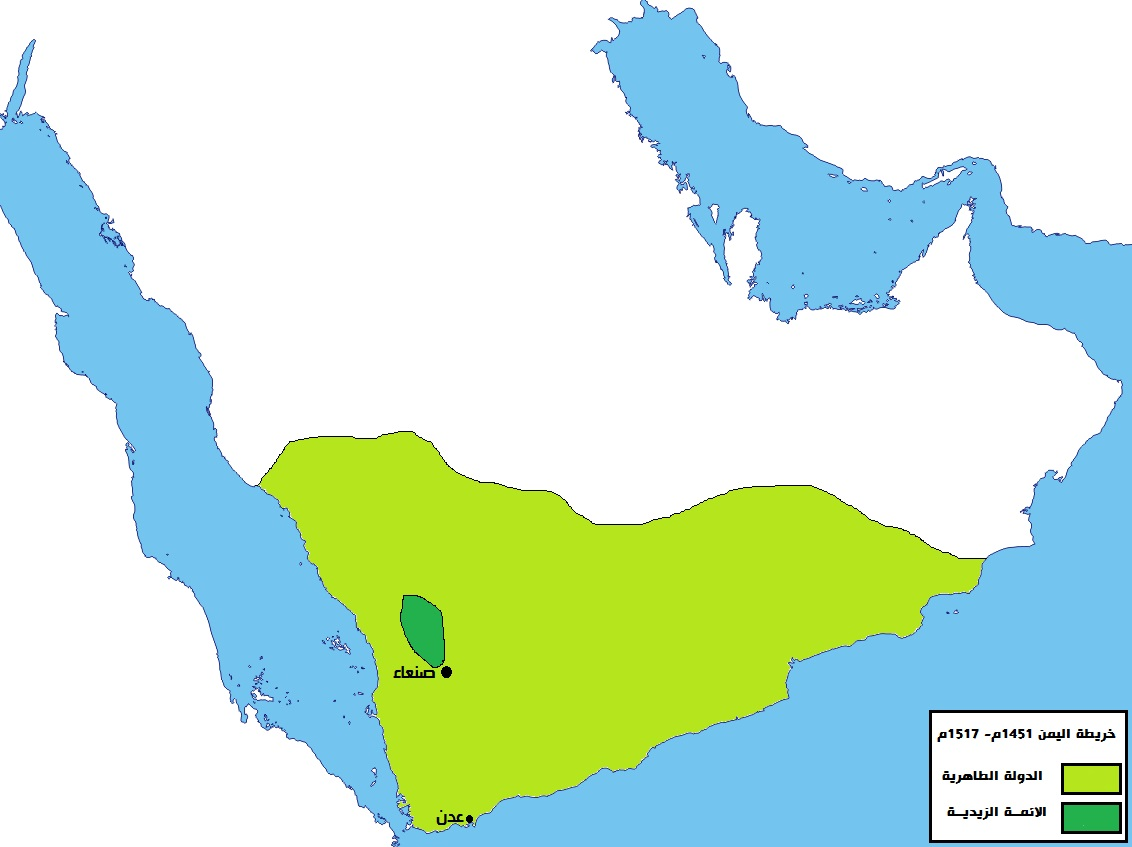
- Tahirids in light green and Zaydi imams in dark green
- Capital: Zabid
- Common languages: Arabic
- Religion: Sunni Islam
- Government: Sultanate
- Sultan
- Historical era: Early modern period
  - Established: 1454
  - Disestablished: 1517
- Currency: Dinar
Preceded by	Succeeded by
Rasulid dynasty	Yemen Eyalet
- Today part of: Yemen; Saudi Arabia; Oman

The Tahirid Sultanate or Tahirid dynasty (Arabic: بنو طاهر, romanized: Banū Ṭahir) were a Muslim dynasty that ruled Yemen from 1454 to 1517. They succeeded the Rasulid Dynasty and were themselves replaced by the Mamluks of Egypt after only 63 years in power.

== History ==
=== Founding of the dynasty and Empire ===
The dynasty is named after Ṭahir ibn Ma'uḍa, the father of its first two rulers. The Tahirids were Yemeni magnates who originated from the area of Juban and al-Miqranah, about 80 km south of Rada'a. They claimed to be descendants of the Umayyad caliph Umar ibn Abd al-Aziz ibn Marwan, but this is not confirmed. According to Selma al-Radi, they were more likely a from a local clan from the Dharahin branch of the Himyar tribe.

The Tahirids were trustees of the sultans of the Rasulid dynasty (1229–1454) and were frequently called in to quell rebellions towards the close of the dynasty. A daughter of the clan was married to a son of the sultan an-Nasir Ahmad. After the death of the latter in 1424 a period of upheavals and dynastic instability plagued Yemen. The Rasulid dynastic collapse gave the Tahirid clan a chance to gain power. Lahij, north of Aden, was taken over by them in 1443, and in 1454, the important port of Aden was swiftly taken by the brothers Amir and Ali bin Tahir and thereby detached from the Rasulids. The last sultan, al-Mas'ud Abu al-Qasim, gave up any hope of maintaining his throne and withdrew to Mecca in the same year. The eldest of the brothers, Amir bin Tahir, took the titles sultan and king (malik) with the regnal name Salah ad-Din al-Malik az-Zafir Amir (r. 1454–1460).

The sultans used to spend the summers in Juban and al-Miqranah, with good access to the southern highlands, using Zabid in the lowland as their winter capital. In that way, Zabid regained the position as one of the centres of learning and culture in the Arab world. Economically, the city nevertheless seems to have declined by the late 15th century.

=== Government of the Tahirid Sultanate ===
The Tahirids tried to imitate the former line, the Banu Rasul. While they were not as impressive builders as these, they were still prominent. Thus they built schools, mosques and irrigation channels as well as water cisterns and bridges in Zabid and Aden, Yafrus, Rada'a, Juban, etc. Some of these are still in use. Arguably their best known monument is the Amiriyya madrasa in Juban and Amiriyya madrasa in Rada'a from 1504.

Like their predecessors they ruled in the first place in the Tihama lowland and the southern highlands. The sultans were less active in expanding their territorial base than the Rasulid rulers. Much of the energy of the sultans was spent on quelling uprisings by Tihama tribes. Shihr in Hadramawt was taken in 1457; however, it was lost at the end of the fifteenth century to the Kathiri princedom that controlled much of the interior of Hadramawt. The Zaidi Shia imams, although split between various claimants in the northern highlands, were mostly able to resist Tahirid rule.

The first sultan az-Zafir Amir sent an army against the imam al-Mutawakkil al-Mutahhar in 1458, but it was defeated and the sultan's brother Muhammad bin Tahir was killed. The debacle probably inspired az-Zafir Amir to abdicate his royal prerogatives to another brother, al-Mujahid Ali. The latter was able to enter San'a temporarily in 1461. However, the city was soon taken back by the Zaydiyya. Subsequent expeditions to San'a were unsuccessful, and the old sultan Amir was killed with many followers when fighting the Zaydis in 1466. In the early sixteenth century sultan az-Zafir Amir II (1489–1517) resumed expansion to the north into Zaydiyya territory and managed to take San'a again in 1504. However, he was soon distracted by enemies on other fronts.

The sultanate was visited by the Italian traveller Ludovico di Varthema around 1503.

== Invasion and defeat ==
The Tahirids had to contend with a number of acute external threats. The Portuguese expanded in the Indian Ocean area after 1498 and soon realized that Aden was the key to access to the Red Sea. Occupying the island Socotra in 1507, the Portuguese activities had negative repercussions for Muslim trade in the region. The Mamluk regime in Egypt, realizing the danger, sent a fleet under Husain al-Kurdi to the south in 1505 with the intention to fight the Christian intruders in the Indian Ocean. When it arrived to Yemen, Az-Zafir Amir II contributed with significant provisions.

However, Husain al-Kurdi's ships were decisively beaten by the Portuguese off Diu, India in 1509. A second fleet was equipped in 1515, again under Husain al-Kurdi. This time, az-Zafir Amir II, who had recently beaten off a Portuguese attack on Aden, refused to provide resources to the Mamluks. The infuriated Husain al-Kurdi sought and found willing allies in Yemen itself, including the Zaydiyya imam al-Mutawakkil Yahya Sharaf ad-Din, the Sulaimani sharif Izz ad-Din bin Ahmad, and the warlord Abu Bakr bin Maqbul of Luhayyah. After having laid at anchor at Zaila on the African coast, he attacked the Tahirid sultan with muskets and artillery, hitherto not used in warfare in Yemen. After winning a number of battles, the Mamluks appropriated the Tahirid treasure house in al-Miqranah. Az-Zafir Amir II fled to the central highlands where he was again defeated. The sultan tried to flee to the strong fortress Dhu Marmar but was captured and beheaded near San'a on 15 May. The entire Tahirid realm fell under the Mamluks with the exception of Aden which held out under the Tahirid governor Amir Murjan.

== Aftermath ==
The Mamluk fleet withdrew after setting up a tributary regime in Zabid. The Mamluk regime in Egypt was overrun by the Ottomans in the same year. The Zabid Mamluks then offered prayers in the name of the Ottoman sultan while defending themselves as well as they could against Zaydiyya and remaining Tahirid forces as well as Arab tribesmen. It was only in 1538 that an Ottoman fleet was dispatched for the Indian Ocean. In Yemen, Prince Amir bin Da'ud sent calls for help from the commander of the fleet, Sulaiman Pasha al-Khadim, since he was cornered at Aden by the Zaydiyya imam al-Mutawakkil Yahya Sharaf ad-Din. Sulaiman Pasha pretended to agree to assist and sailed to Aden. However, he sent his men ashore, arrested Amir bin Da'ud and his principal grandees, and hanged them from the yardarms of the ships on 3 August 1538. Shortly afterward, Mamluk governance in Yemen was eliminated and Turkish rule commenced.

== List of rulers ==
The following is a list of Tahirid rulers, and the resistance leaders after Mamluk conquest.

=== Sultans ===
1. al-Zafir Amir I, son of Tahir, 1454–1460
2. al-Mujahid Ali, son of Tahir, 1460–1479
3. al-Mansur Abd al-Wahhab, son of Da'ud bin Tahir, 1479–1489
4. al-Zafir Amir II, son of Abd al-Wahhab, 1489–1517

=== Leaders against the Mamluks ===
1. Ahmad, son of Amir II, 1517–1518
2. Amir, son of Abd al-Malik ibn Da'ud ibn Tahir, 1518–1519
3. Ahmad, son of Muhammad ibn Amir I, 1519–1520
4. Abd al-Malik, son of Muhammad ibn Da'ud ibn Tahir, 1520–1527
5. Amir bin Da'ud, possibly grandnephew of al-Mansur Abd al-Wahhab, 1527–1538

== See also ==
- List of Sunni Muslim dynasties
- History of Yemen
- Islamic history of Yemen
- Imams of Yemen
