= Jahaf district =

Coordinates: 13.7256°N 44.6575°E

Jahaf District
- District
- Interactive map of Jahaf District
- Country: Yemen
- Governorate: Dhale

Population (2003)
  - Total: 22,897
- Time zone: UTC+3 (Yemen Standard Time)

Jahaf District is a district of the Dhale Governorate, Yemen. As of 2003, the district had a population of 22,897 inhabitants.

== Sub-districts of Jihaf District ==
Jihaf District is divided into the following sub-districts (azilah):

- Al Uzlah
- Al Sarir
- Bani Said

== Notable people ==
- Major General Mohsen al-Daeri, Minister of Defense of Yemen from 2022 to 2026.
- Dr. Shaya al-Zindani, member of the Presidential Leadership Council and Prime Minister of Yemen.
- Brigadier General Abdullah Mahdi Saeed, head of the local leadership of the Southern Transitional Council in Dhale Governorate.
