= Dhale district =

Coordinates: 13°50′N 44°43′E

Dhale district مديرية الضالع
- District
- Interactive map of Dhale district
- Country: Yemen
- Governorate: Dhale

Area
  - Total: 345 km^{2} (133 sq mi)

Population (2003)
  - Total: 80,213
- Time zone: UTC+3 (Yemen Standard Time)

Dhale District (Arabic: مديرية الضالع) is a district of the Dhale Governorate, Yemen. As of 2003, the district had a population of 80,213 inhabitants.
