= Dhale Governorate =

Coordinates: 13°42′N 44°43′E

Dhale الضالع
- Governorate
- Country: Yemen
- Region: Aden Region
- Seat: Dhale

Government
  - Governor: General Ali Muqbel Saleh

Area
  - Total: 4,786 km^{2} (1,848 sq mi)

Population (2011)
  - Total: 669,000
  - Density: 140/km^{2} (362/sq mi)

Dhale (Arabic: الضالع, romanized: aḍ-Ḍāliʿ) is one of the Yemeni governorates that was created after the unification of Yemen. The population of the province accounts for 2% of the total population of the republic. The governorate is divided into 9 districts. The city of Dhale is the administrative centre of the province.

Dhale is one of the governorates that is known for agriculture, and most of the population works in that industry. The most important agricultural crop is coffee. The province also contains mineral resources, most importantly talc, which is used in the manufacture of paper, paint, cosmetics and pesticides. This governorate is also home to the Damt hot-springs (Ḥamam-Damt), a popular tourist attraction. One of the ancient cities in the region is Juban, a city famous for its castle and the historic Mansuria school, built by the Tahrids. The climate in Dhale governorate is mostly temperate throughout the year.

== History ==
Before the unification of Yemen in 1990, Dhale governorate consisted of nine districts, five in South Yemen and four in North Yemen. The South Yemeni districts, Al Hussein, Al Azariq, Ash Shu'ayb, Jahaf, and Ad Dhale'e, were all in the country's Lahij Governorate. The North Yemeni districts were Juban, part of Al Bayda Governorate, Al Husha, part of Taiz Governorate, and Damt district and Qa'atabah district, both part of Ibb Governorate. 70% of the area of today's Dhale Governorate was in North Yemen in 1989.

== Geography ==
Dhale Governorate is 245 kilometers away from the Yemeni capital Sana'a.

=== Adjacent governorates ===
Governorates of Yemen

- Al Bayda Governorate (north)
- Ibb Governorate (west)
- Lahij Governorate (south)
- Taiz Governorate (southwest)

=== Districts ===
Dhale Governorate is divided into the following 9 districts. These districts are further divided into sub-districts, and then further subdivided into villages:

Name	Population	Governorate before unification
Ad Dhale'e district	80,213	Lahij, South Yemen
Al Azariq district	37,295	Lahij, South Yemen
Jahaf district	22,897	Lahij, South Yemen
Al Hussein district	37,118	Lahij, South Yemen
Ash Shu'ayb district	38,261	Lahij, South Yemen
Al Husha district	60,178	Taiz, North Yemen
Juban district	73,960	Al Bayda, North Yemen
Damt district	60,994	Ibb, North Yemen
Qa'atabah district	91,206	Ibb, North Yemen
