= History of Yemen =

Yemen is one of the oldest centers of civilization in the Near East. Its relatively fertile land and adequate rainfall in a moister climate helped sustain a stable population, a feature recognized by the ancient Greek geographer Ptolemy, who described Yemen as Eudaimon Arabia, meaning "Fertile Arabia" or "Happy Arabia". The South Arabian alphabet was developed at latest between the 12th century BC and the 6th century AD, when Yemen was successively dominated by six civilizations that controlled the lucrative spice trade: Ma'in, Qataban, Hadhramaut, Awsan, Saba, and Himyar. With the arrival of Islam in 630 AD, Yemen became part of the wider Muslim world, where it has remained.

== Ancient history ==
Yemen

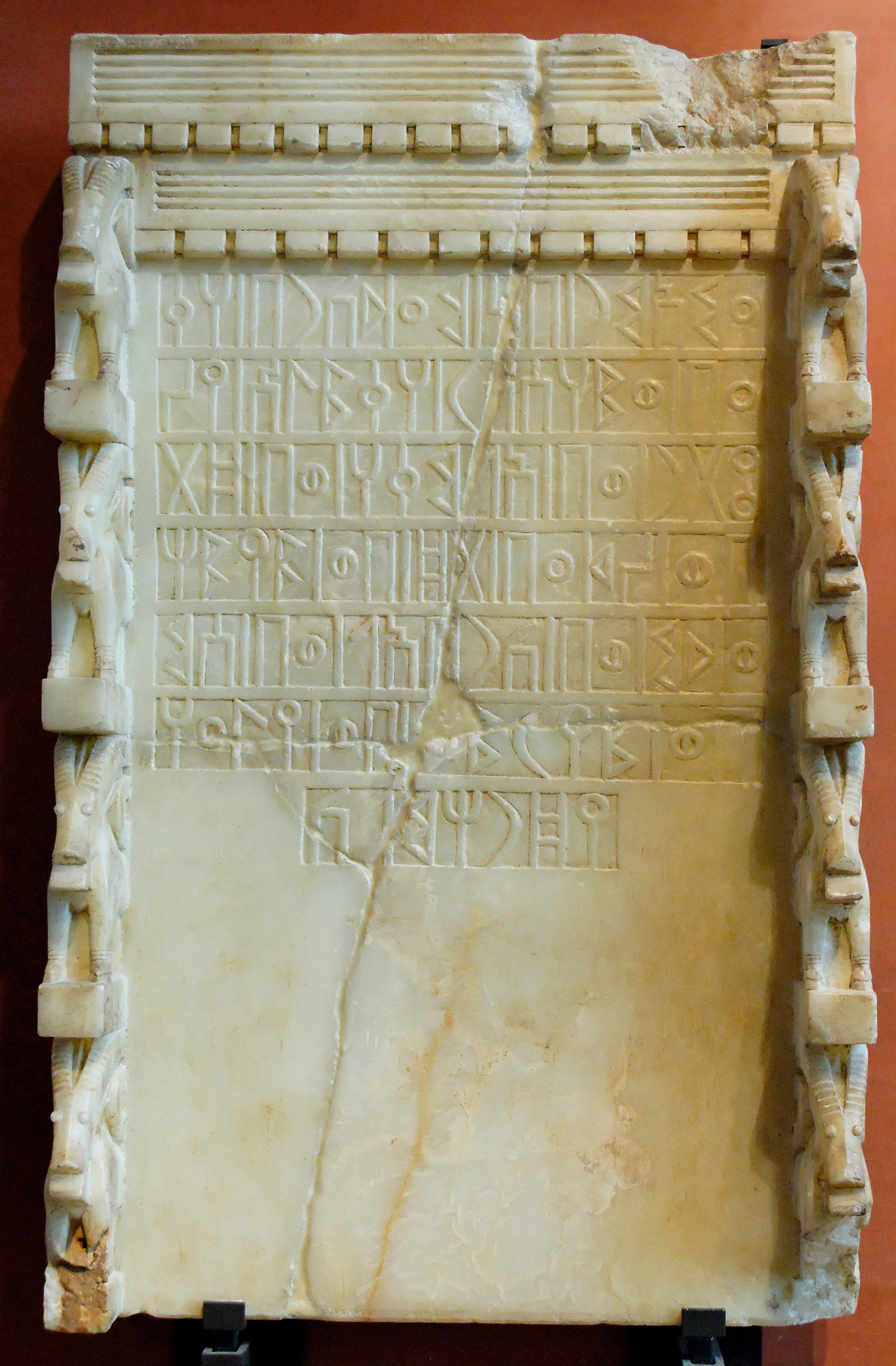
Sabaean inscription addressed to the moon-god Almaqah, mentioning five South Arabian gods, two reigning sovereigns, and two governors, 7th century BC.

With its long sea border between early civilizations, Yemen has long existed at a crossroads of cultures with a strategic location in terms of trade on the west of the Arabian Peninsula. Large settlements for their era existed in the mountains of northern Yemen as early as 5000 BC. Little is known about ancient Yemen and how exactly it transitioned from nascent Bronze Age civilizations to more trade-focused caravan kingdoms.

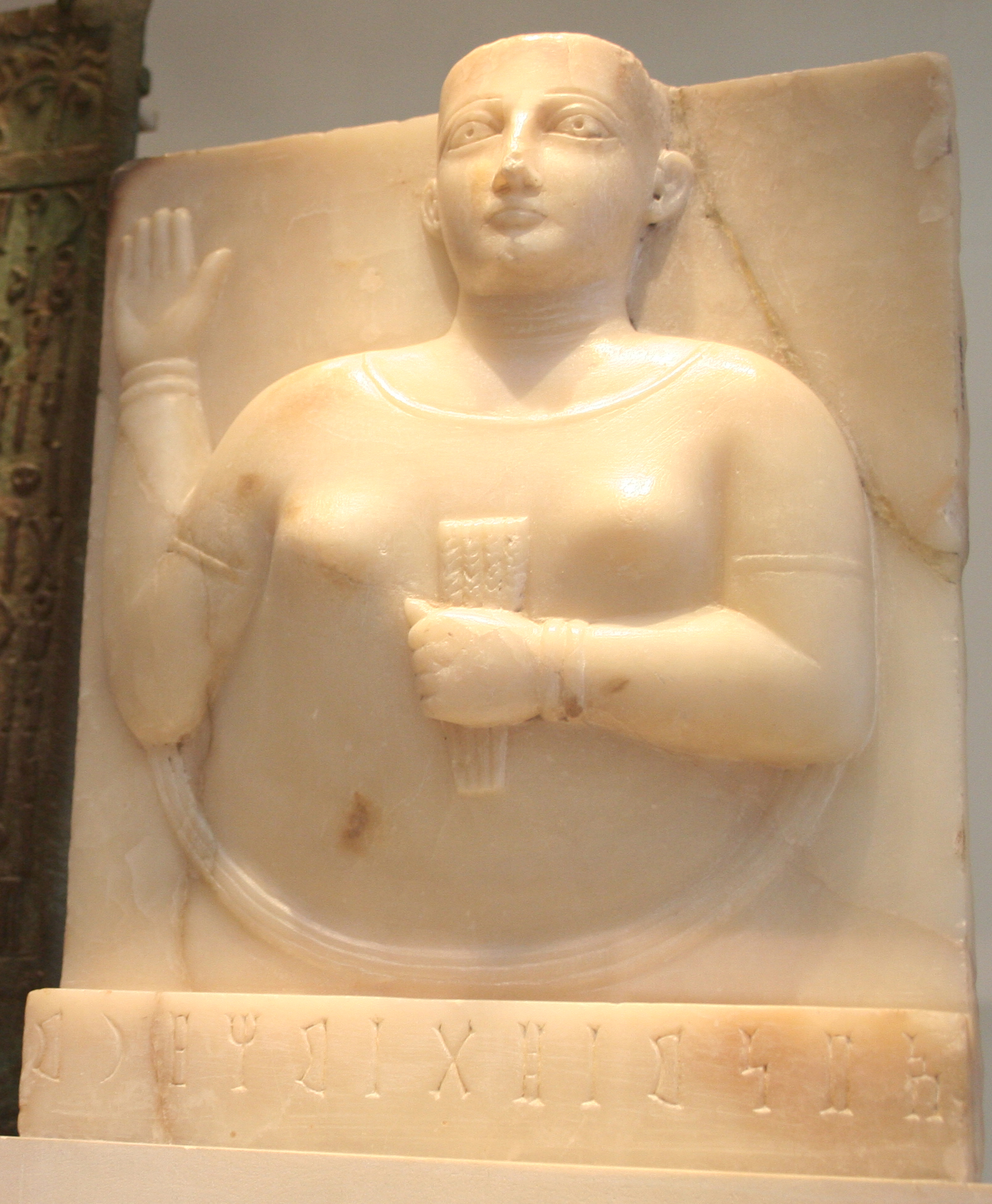
Sabaean gravestone of a woman holding a stylized sheaf of wheat, a symbol of fertility in ancient Yemen

The Sabaean Kingdom came into existence from at least the 11th century BC. There were four major kingdoms or tribal confederations in South Arabia: Saba, Hadramout, Qataban and Ma'in. Saba is believed to be biblical Sheba and was the most prominent federation. The Sabaean rulers adopted the title Mukarrib generally thought to mean "unifier". The role of the Mukarrib was to bring the various tribes under the kingdom and preside over them all. The Sabaeans built the Great Dam of Marib around 940 BC. The dam was built to withstand the seasonal flash floods surging down the valley.

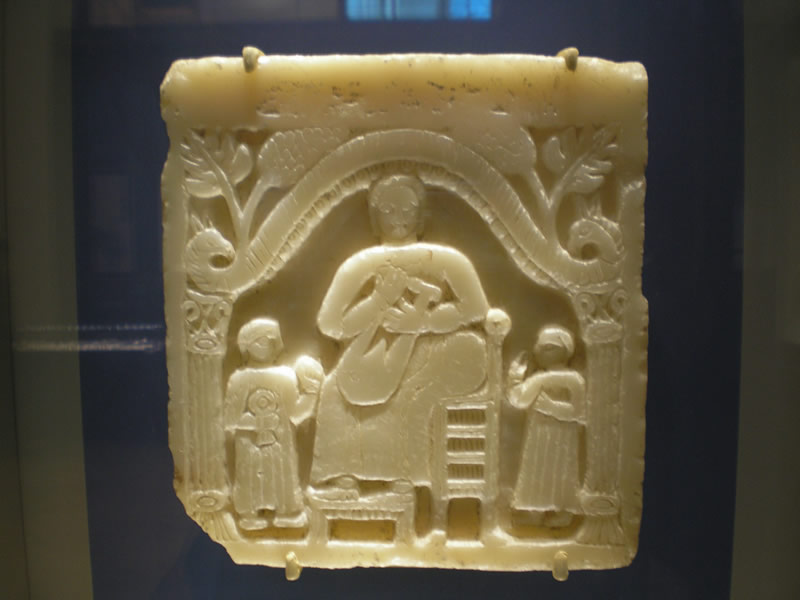
A funerary stela featuring a musical scene, 1st century AD

The Sabaean Mukarrib Karib'il Watar I, in the 7th century BC, recorded the undertaking of eight campaigns, one in which he defeated the kingdom of Awsan, and divided its land between himself and his allies. Lack of water in the Arabian Peninsula prevented the Sabaeans from unifying the entire peninsula. Instead, they established various colonies to control trade routes. Evidence of Sabaean influence is found in Eritrea and northern Ethiopia, where the South Arabian alphabet religion and pantheon, and the South Arabian style of art and architecture were introduced. The Sabaeans created a sense of identity through their religion. They worshipped Almaqah and believed themselves to be his children. For centuries, the Sabaeans controlled outbound trade across the Bab-el-Mandeb, a strait separating the Arabian Peninsula from the Horn of Africa and the Red Sea from the Indian Ocean.

By the 3rd century BC, Qataban, Hadramout and Ma'in became independent from Saba and established themselves in the Yemeni arena. Minaean rule stretched as far as Dedan, with their capital at Baraqish. The Sabaeans regained their control over Ma'in after the collapse of Qataban in 50 BC. By the time of the Roman expedition to Arabia Felix in 25 BC, the Sabaeans were once again the dominating power in Southern Arabia. Aelius Gallus was ordered to lead a military campaign to establish Roman dominance over the Sabaeans. The Romans had a vague and contradictory geographical knowledge about Arabia Felix or Yemen. The Roman army of ten thousand men reached Marib, but was not able to conquer the city, according to Cassius Dio and Pliny the Elder. Strabo's close relationship with Aelius Gallus led him to attempt to justify his friend's failure in his writings. It took the Romans six months to reach Marib and sixty days to return to Egypt. The Romans blamed their Nabataean guide and executed him for treachery. No direct mention in Sabaean inscriptions of the Roman expedition has yet been found.

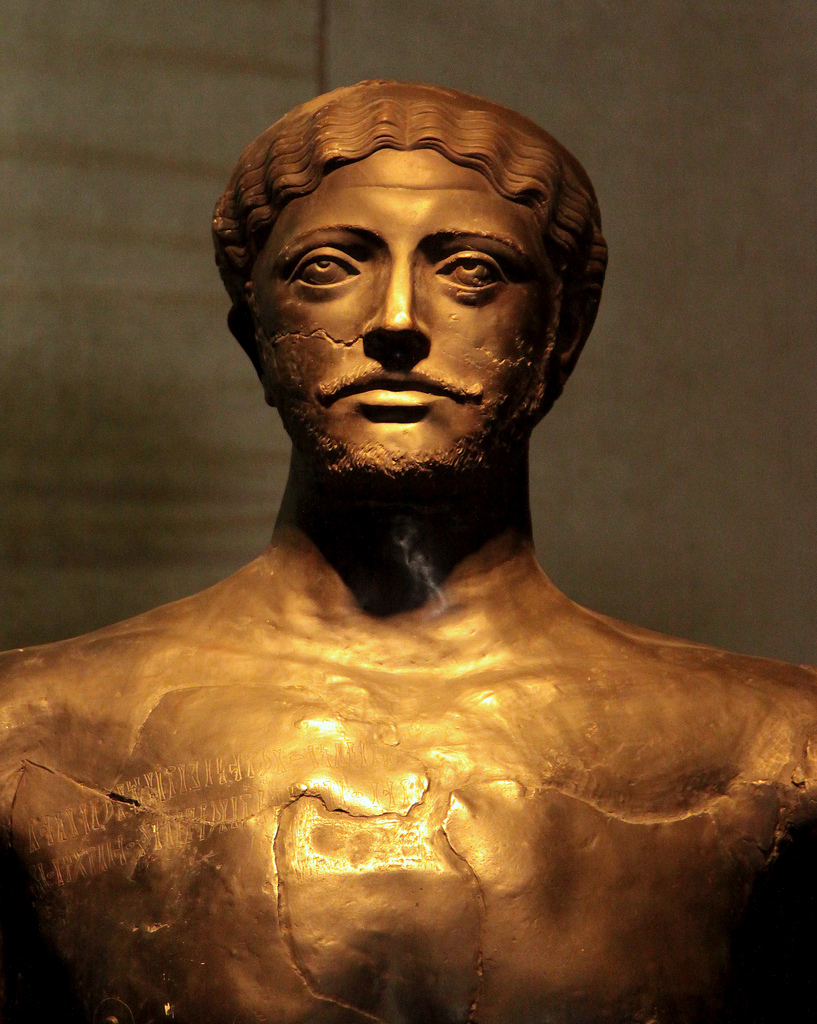
Himyarite King Dhamar Ali Yahbur II

After the Roman expedition – perhaps earlier – the country fell into chaos and two clans, namely Hamdan and Himyar, claimed kingship, assuming the title King of Sheba and Dhu Raydan. Dhu Raydan (i.e. Himyarites) allied themselves with Aksum in Ethiopia against the Sabaeans. The chief of Bakil and king of Saba and Dhu Raydan, El Sharih Yahdhib, launched successful campaigns against the Himyarites and Habashat (i.e. Aksum), El Sharih took proud of his campaigns and added the title Yahdhib to his name, which means "suppressor"; he used to kill his enemies by cutting them to pieces. Sanaa came into prominence during his reign as he built the Ghumdan Palace to be his place of residence.

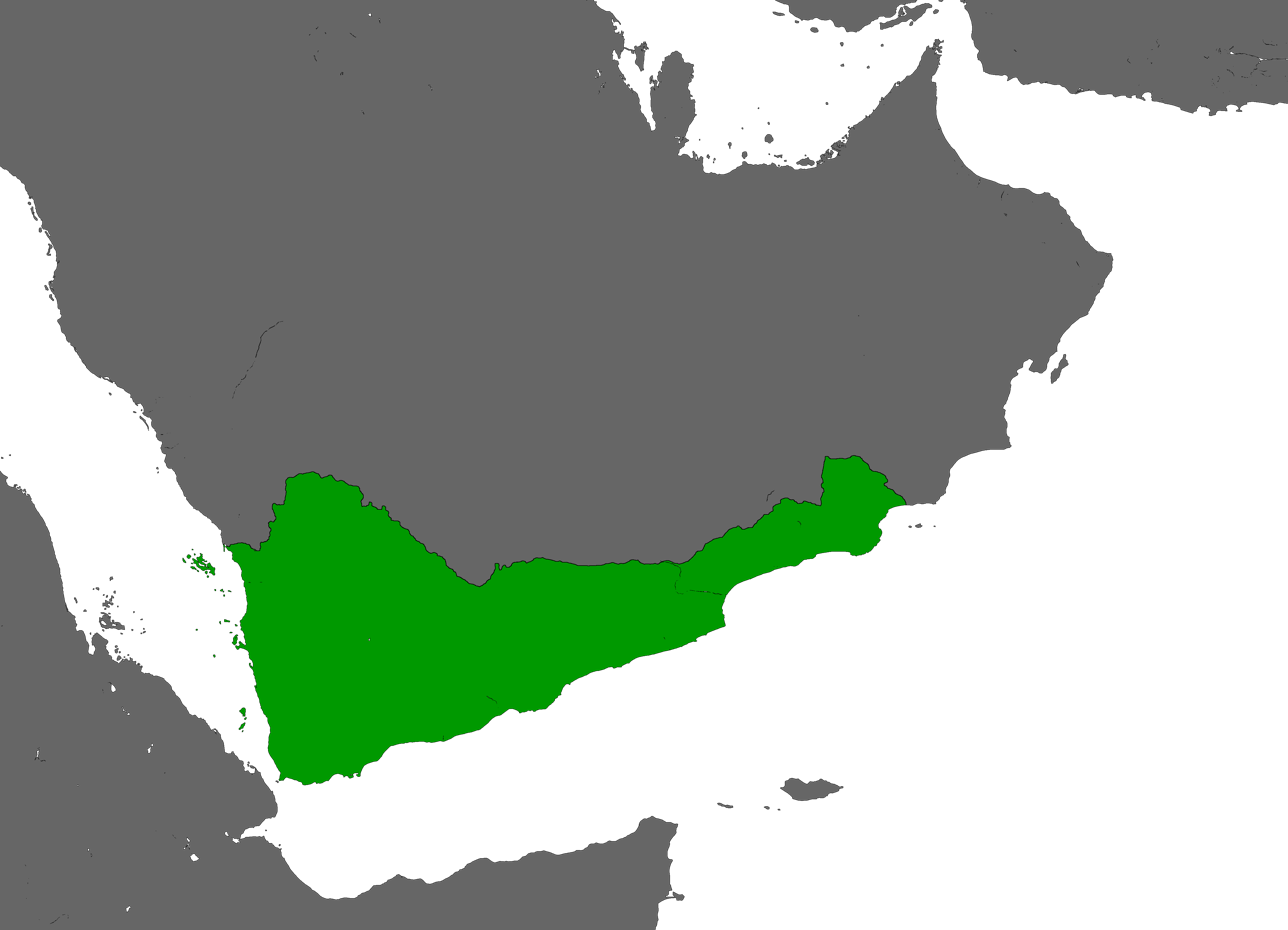
The Himyarite Kingdom at its height in 525 AD

The Sasanian Empire at its greatest extent c. 620, under Khosrow II

The Himyarite annexed Sanaa from Hamdan c. AD 100. Hashdi tribesmen rebelled against them, however, and regained Sanaa in around 180. It was not until 275 that Shammar Yahri'sh conquered Hadramout and Najran and Tihama, thus unifying Yemen and consolidating Himyarite rule. The Himyarites rejected polytheism and adhered to a consensual form of monotheism called Rahmanism. In 354, Roman Emperor Constantius II sent an embassy headed by Theophilos the Indian to convert the Himyarites to Christianity. According to Philostorgius, the mission was resisted by local Jews. Several inscriptions have been found in Hebrew and Sabaean praising the ruling house in Jewish terms for helping and empowering the People of Israel.

According to Islamic traditions, King As'ad The Perfect mounted a military expedition to support the Jews of Yathrib. Abu Karib As'ad, as known from the inscriptions, led a military campaign to central Arabia or Najd to support the vassal Kinda against the Lakhmids. However, no direct reference to Judaism or Yathrib was discovered from his lengthy reign. Abu Karib As'ad died in 445, having reigned for almost 50 years. By 515, Himyar became increasingly divided along religious lines and a bitter conflict between different factions paved the way for an Aksumite intervention. The last Himyarite king Mu'di Karab Ya'fir was supported by Aksum against his Jewish rivals. Mu'di Karab was Christian and launched a campaign against the Lakhmids in Southern Iraq, with the support of other Arab allies of The Byzantine Empire. The Lakhmids were a Bulwark of Persia, which was intolerant to a proselytizing religion like Christianity.

After the death of Ma'adikarib Ya'fur around 521 AD, a Himyarite Jewish warlord called Dhu Nuwas rose to power. He began a campaign of violence against Christians under his control. Dhu Nawas executed Byzantine traders, converted the church in Zafar into a synagogue, and killed its priests, among other acts of conquest. He marched toward the port city of Mokha, killing 14,000 and capturing 11,000. Then he settled a camp in Bab-el-Mandeb to prevent aid flowing from Aksum. At the same time, Yusuf sent an army under the command of another Jewish warlord, Sharahil Yaqbul, to Najran. Sharahil had reinforcements from the Bedouins of the Kinda and Madh'hij tribes, eventually wiping out the Christian community in Najran by means of execution and forced conversion to Judaism. Blady speculates that he was likely motivated by stories about Byzantine violence against Byzantine Jewish communities in his decision to begin his campaign of state violence against Christians existing within his territory.

Christian sources portray Dhu Nuwas as a Jewish zealot, while Islamic traditions say that he marched around 20,000 Christians into trenches filled with flaming oil, burning them alive. Himyarite inscriptions attributed to Dhu Nuwas himself show great pride in killing 27,000, enslaving 20,500 Christians in Ẓafār and Najran and killing 570,000 beasts of burden belonging to them as a matter of imperial policy. It is reported that Byzantium Emperor Justin I sent a letter to the Aksumite King Kaleb, pressuring him to "...attack the abominable Hebrew." A military alliance of Byzantine, Aksumite, and Arab Christians successfully defeated Dhu Nuwas around 525–527 AD and a client Christian king was installed on the Himyarite throne.

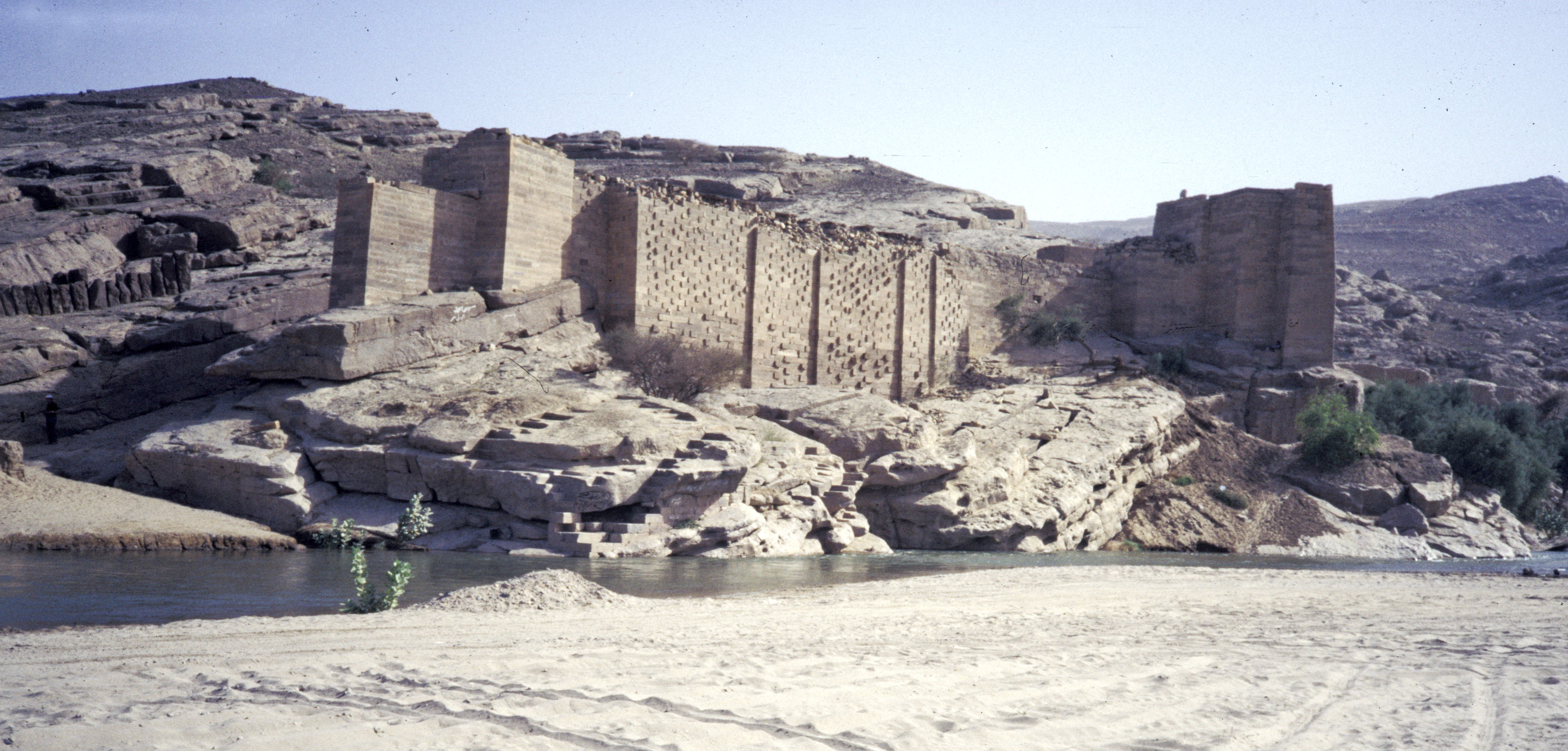
Ruins of The Great Dam of Marib

Esimiphaios was a local Christian lord, mentioned in an inscription celebrating the burning of an ancient Sabaean palace in Marib to build a church on its ruins. Three new churches were built in Najran alone. Many tribes did not recognize Esimiphaios's authority. Esimiphaios was displaced in 531 by a warrior named Abraha, who refused to leave Yemen and declared himself an independent king of Himyar. Emperor Justinian I sent an embassy to Yemen. He wanted the officially Christian Himyarites to use their influence on the tribes in inner Arabia to launch military operations against Persia. Justinian I bestowed the dignity of king upon the Arab sheikhs of Kinda and Ghassan in central and north Arabia. From early on, Roman and Byzantine policy was to develop close links with the powers of the coast of the Red Sea. They were successful in converting Aksum and influencing their culture. The results with regard to Yemen were rather disappointing.

A Kindite prince called Yazid bin Kabshat rebelled against Abraha and his Arab Christian allies. A truce was reached once The Great Dam of Marib had suffered a breach. Abraha died around 555–565 AD; no reliable sources regarding his death are available. The Sasanid empire annexed Aden around 570. Under their rule, most of Yemen enjoyed great autonomy except for Aden and Sanaa. This era marked the collapse of ancient South Arabian civilization, since the greater part of the country was under several independent clans until the arrival of Islam in 630.

== Middle Ages ==
=== Advent of Islam and the three Dynasties ===
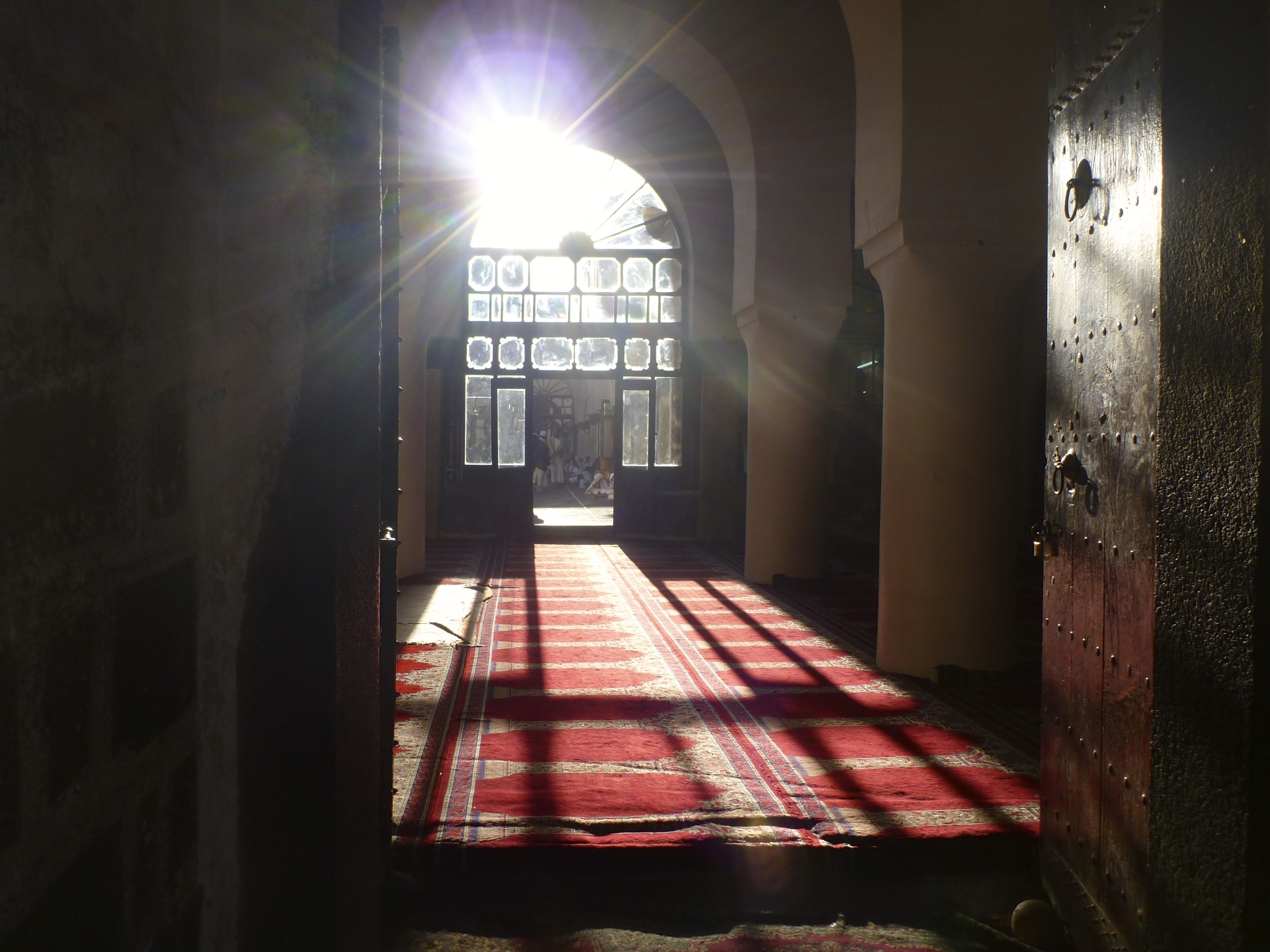
Interior of the Great Mosque of Sanaa, the oldest mosque in Yemen

Prophet Muhammad sent his cousin Ali to Sanaa and its surroundings around 630. At the time, Yemen was the most advanced region in Arabia. The Banu Hamdan confederation were among the first to accept Islam. Muhammad sent Muadh ibn Jabal as well to Al-Janad in present-day Taiz, and dispatched letters to various tribal leaders. The reason behind this was the division among the tribes and the absence of a strong central authority in Yemen during the days of the prophet. Major tribes, including Himyar, sent delegations to Medina during the Year of delegations around 630–631. Several Yemenis had already accepted Islam, including Ammar ibn Yasir, Al-Ala'a Al-Hadrami, Miqdad ibn Aswad, Abu Musa Ashaari and Sharhabeel ibn Hasana. A man named 'Abhala ibn Ka'ab Al-Ansi expelled the remaining Persians and claimed to be a prophet of Rahman. He was assassinated by a Yemeni of Persian origin called Fayruz al-Daylami. Christians, who were mainly staying in Najran along with Jews, agreed to pay Jizya, although some Jews converted to Islam, such as Ka'ab al-Ahbar.

The country was stable during the Rashidun Caliphate. Yemeni tribes played a pivotal role in the Islamic conquests of Egypt, Iraq, Persia, the Levant, Anatolia, North Africa, Sicily and Andalusia. Yemeni tribes that settled in Syria, contributed significantly to the solidification of Umayyad rule, especially during the reign of Marwan I. Powerful Yemenite tribes like Kindah were on his side during the Battle of Marj Rahit. Several emirates led by people of Yemeni descent were established in North Africa and Andalusia. Effective control over entire Yemen was not achieved by the Umayyad Caliphate. Imam Abd Allah ibn Yahya was elected in 745 to lead the Ibāḍī movement in Hadramawt and Oman. He expelled the Umayyad governor from Sanaa and captured Mecca and Medina in 746. Ibn Yahya, known by his nickname Talib al-Haqq (Seeker of the Truth), established the first Ibadi state in the history of Islam but was killed in Taif in around 749.

Muhammad ibn Ziyad founded the Ziyadid dynasty in Tihama around 818; the state stretched from Haly (In present-day Saudi Arabia) to Aden. They nominally recognized the Abbasid Caliphate but were in fact ruling independently from their capital in Zabid. The history of this dynasty is obscure; they never exercised control over the highlands and Hadramawt, and did not control more than a coastal strip of the Yemen (Tihama) bordering the Red Sea. A Himyarite clan called the Yufirids established their rule over the highlands from Saada to Taiz, while Hadramawt was an Ibadi stronghold and rejected all allegiance to the Abbasids in Baghdad. By virtue of its location, the Ziyadid dynasty of Zabid developed a special relationship with Abyssinia. The chief of the Dahlak islands exported slaves as well as amber and leopard hides to the then ruler of Yemen.

The first Zaidi imam, Yahya ibn al-Husayn, arrived to Yemen in 893. He was the founder of the Zaidi imamate in 897. He was a religious cleric and judge who was invited to come to Saada from Medina to arbitrate tribal disputes. Imam Yahya persuaded local tribesmen to follow his teachings. The sect slowly spread across the highlands, as the tribes of Hashid and Bakil, later known as the twin wings of the imamate, accepted his authority. Yahya established his influence in Saada and Najran; he also tried to capture Sanaa from the Yufirids in 901, but he failed miserably. In 904, the newly established Isma'ili followers invaded Sanaa. The Yufirid emir As'ad ibn Ibrahim retreated to Al-Jawf, and between 904 and 913, Sanaa was conquered no less than 20 times by Isma'ilis and Yufirids. As'ad ibn Ibrahim regained Sanaa in 915. The country was in turmoil as Sanaa became a battlefield for the three dynasties as well as independent tribes.

The Yufirid emir Abdullah ibn Qahtan attacked and burned Zabid in 989, severely weakening the Ziyadid dynasty. The Ziyadid monarchs lost effective power after 989, or even earlier than that. Meanwhile, a succession of slaves held power in Zabid and continued to govern in the name of their masters eventually establishing their own dynasty around 1022 or 1050 according to different sources. Although they were recognized by the Abbasid Caliphate in Baghdad, they ruled no more than Zabid and four districts to its north. The rise of the Ismaili Shia Sulayhid dynasty in the Yemeni highlands reduced their history to a series of intrigues.

=== Sulayhid Dynasty ===
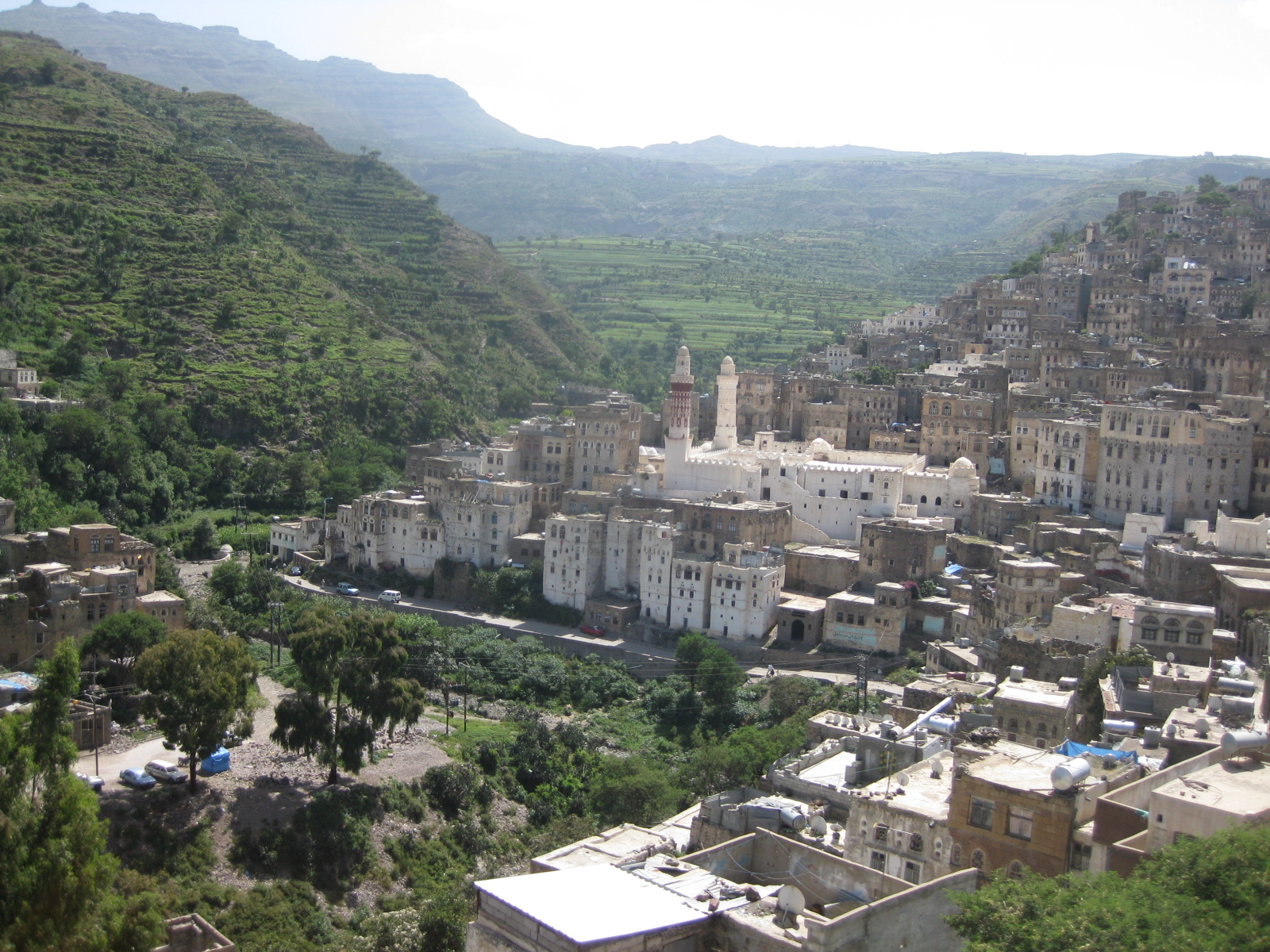
Jibla became the capital of the Sulayhid dynasty

The Sulayhid dynasty was founded in the northern highlands around 1040. At the time, Yemen was ruled by different local dynasties. In 1060, Ali ibn Mohammed Al-Sulayhi conquered Zabid and killed its ruler Al-Najah, founder of the Najahid dynasty, whose sons were forced to flee to Dahlak. Hadramawt fell into Sulayhid hands after their capture of Aden in 1062. By 1063, Ali had subjugated Greater Yemen. He then marched toward Hejaz and occupied Makkah. Ali was married to Asma bint Shihab, who governed Yemen with her husband. The Khutba during Friday prayers was proclaimed in her husband's and her name. No other Arab woman had this honor since the advent of Islam.

Ali al-Sulayhi was killed by Najah's sons on his way to Mecca in 1084. His son Ahmad al-Mukarram led an army to Zabid and killed 8,000 of its inhabitants. He later installed the Zurayids to govern Aden. Ahmad al-Mukarram, who had been afflicted with facial paralysis resulting from war injuries, retired in 1087 and handed over power to his wife Arwa al-Sulayhi. Queen Arwa moved the seat of the Sulayhid dynasty from Sanaa to Jibla, a small town in central Yemen near Ibb. Jibla was strategically near the Sulayhid dynasty source of wealth, the agricultural central highlands. It was also within easy reach of the southern portion of the country, especially Aden. She sent Ismaili missionaries to India where a significant Ismaili community was formed that exists to this day. Queen Arwa continued to rule securely until her death in 1138.

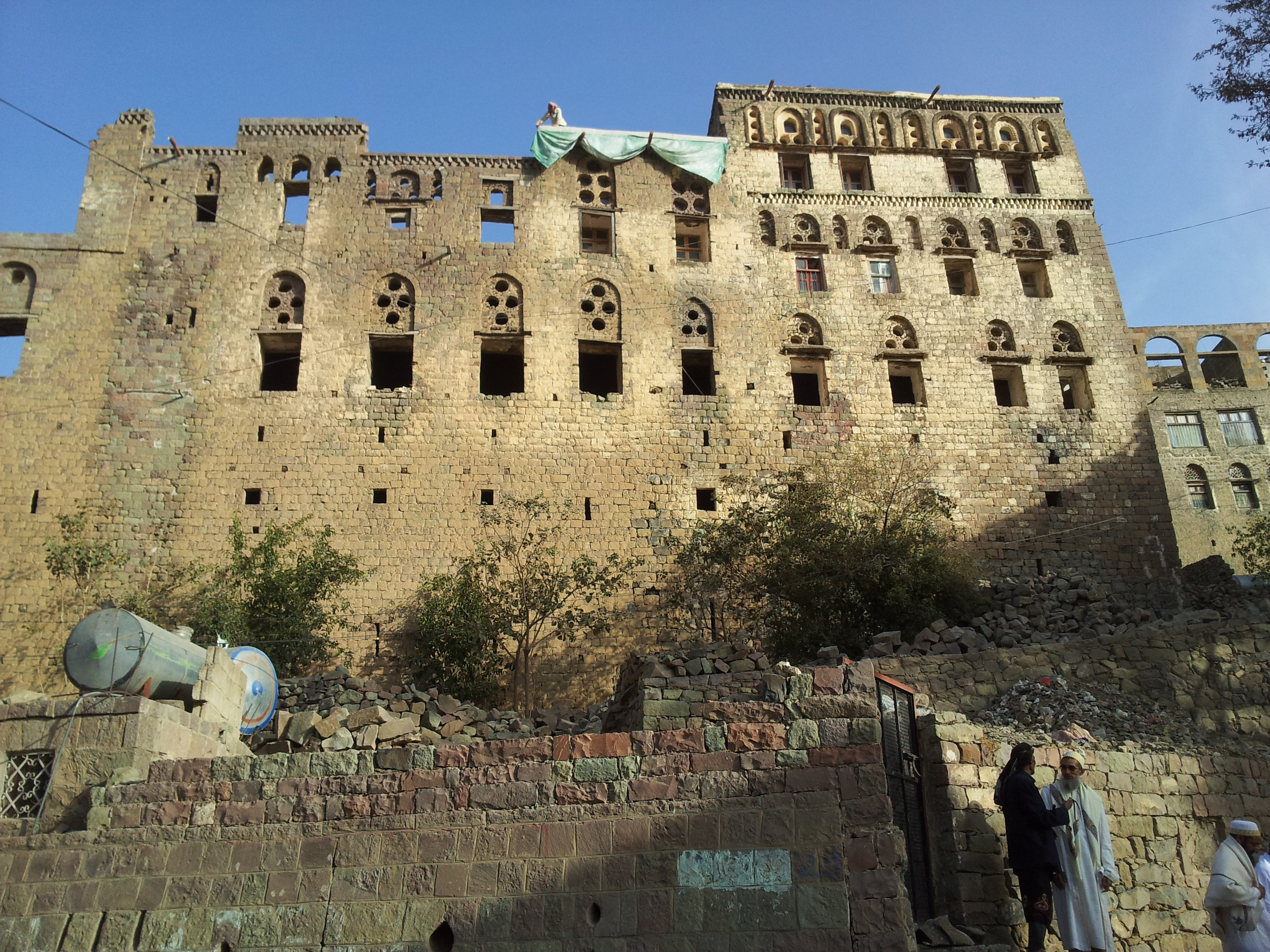
Queen Arwa al- Sulaihi Palace

Arwa al-Sulayhi is still remembered as a great and much loved sovereign, as attested in Yemeni historiography, literature, and popular lore, where she is referred to as Balqis al-sughra , that is "the junior queen of Sheba". Although the Sulayhids were Ismaili, they never tried to impose their beliefs on the public. Shortly after queen Arwa's death, the country was split between five competing petty dynasties along religious lines. The Ayyubid dynasty overthrew the Fatimid caliphate in Egypt. A few years after their rise to power, Saladin dispatched his brother Turan Shah to conquer Yemen in 1174.

=== Zurayid Dynasty ===
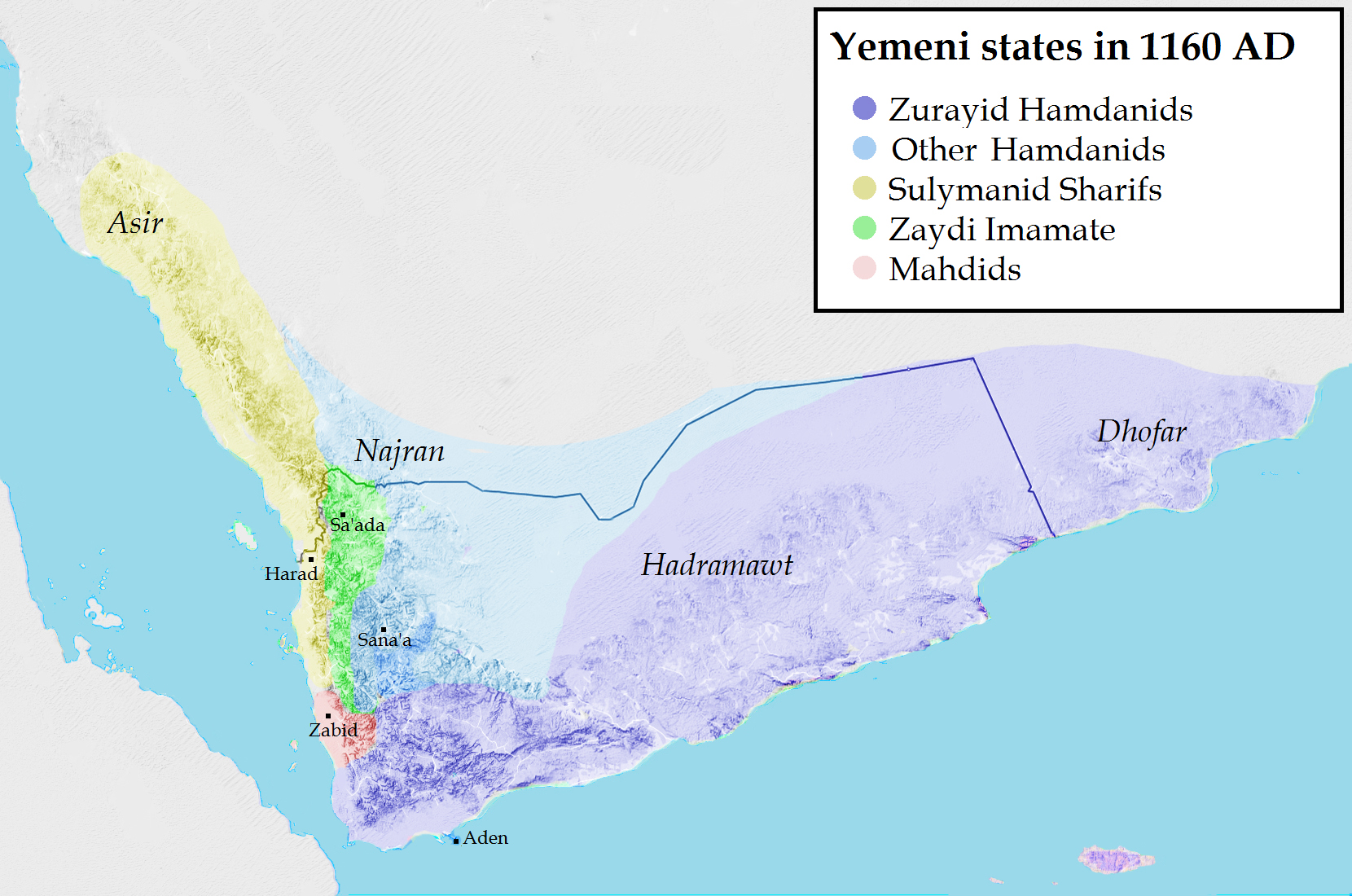
Zurayid Kingdom and the neighbouring polities

Al-Abbas & al-Mas'ūd sons of Karam Al-Yami from the Hamdan tribe started ruling Aden for the Sulayhids, when Al-Abbas died in 1083. His son Zuray, who gave the dynasty its name, proceeded to rule together with his uncle al-Mas'ūd. They took part in the Sulayhid leader al-Mufaddal's campaign against the Najahid capital Zabid and were both killed during the siege (1110). Their respective sons ceased to pay tribute to the Sulayhid queen Arwa al-Sulayhi. They were worsted by a Sulayhid expedition but queen Arwa agreed to reduce the tribute by half, to 50,000 dinars per year. The Zurayids again failed to pay and were once again forced to yield to the might of the Sulayhids, but this time the annual tribute from the incomes of Aden was reduced to 25,000. Later on they ceased to pay even that since Sulayhid power was on the wane. After 1110 the Zurayids thus led a more than 60 years long independent rule in the city, bolstered by the international trade. The chronicles mention luxury goods such as textiles, perfume and porcelain, coming from places like North Africa, Egypt, Iraq, Oman, Kirman, and China. After the demise of queen Arwa al-Sulayhi in 1138, the Fatimids in Cairo kept a representation in Aden, adding further prestige to the Zurayids. The Zurayids were sacked by the Ayyubids in 1174.

=== Ayyubid conquest ===
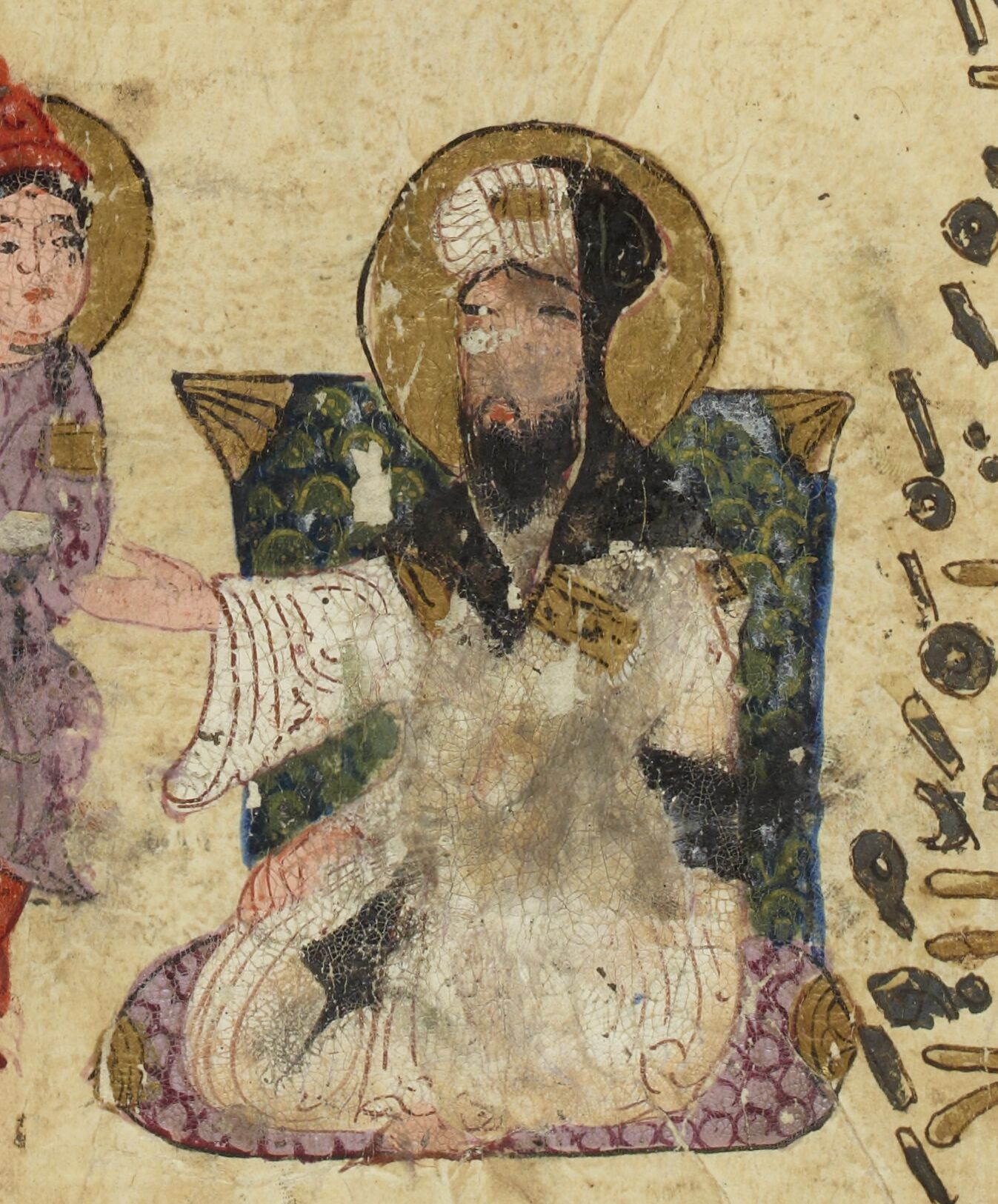
The Qadi of Sa'dah, Yemen, in 1200-1210, according to the Maqamat al-Hariri (BNF 3929)

Turan Shah conquered Zabid from the Mahdids in May 1174, then marched toward Aden in June and captured it from the Zurayids. The Hamdanid sultans of Sanaa resisted the Ayyubid in 1175 and it was not until 1189 that the Ayyubids managed to definitely secure Sanaa. The Ayyubid rule was stable in southern and central Yemen where they succeeded in eliminating the mini-states of that region, while Ismaili and Zaidi tribesmen continued to hold out in a number of fortresses. The Ayyubids failed to capture the Zaydis stronghold in northern Yemen. In 1191, Zaydis of Shibam Kawkaban rebelled and killed 700 Ayyubid soldiers. Imam Abdullah bin Hamza proclaimed the imamate in 1197 and fought al-Mu'izz Ismail, the Ayyubid Sultan of Yemen. Imam Abdullah was defeated at first but was able to conquer Sanaa and Dhamar in 1198 al-Mu'izz Ismail was assassinated in 1202 Abdullah bin Hamza carried on the struggle against the Ayyubid until his death in 1217. After his demise, the Zaidi community was split between two rival imams. The Zaydis were dispersed and a truce was signed with the Ayyubid in 1219. The Ayyubid army was defeated in Dhamar in 1226. Ayyubid Sultan Mas'ud Yusuf left for Mecca in 1228 never to return. Other sources suggest that he was forced to leave for Egypt instead in 1223.

=== Rasulid Dynasty ===
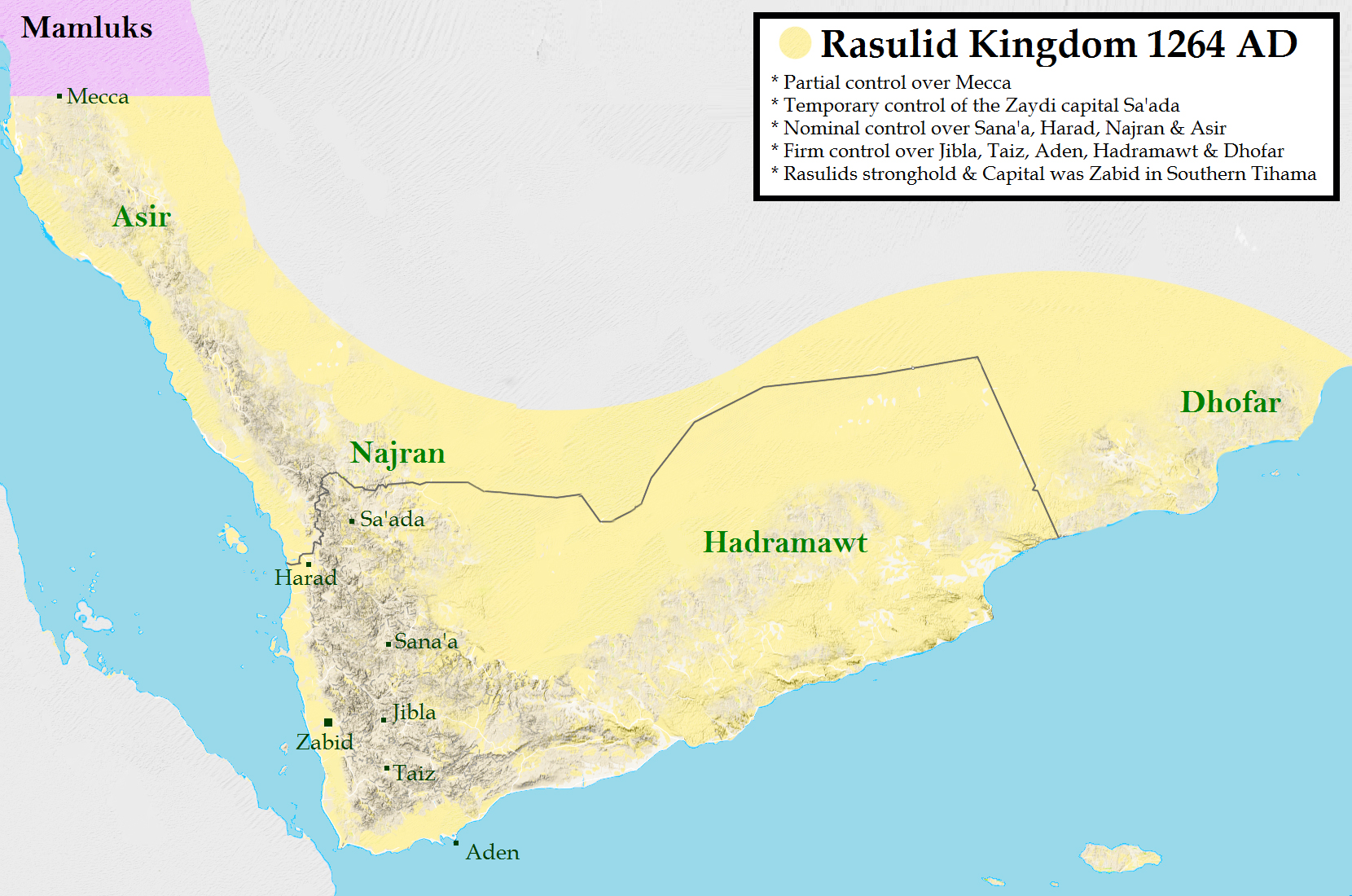
Rasulid Kingdom around 1264 AD

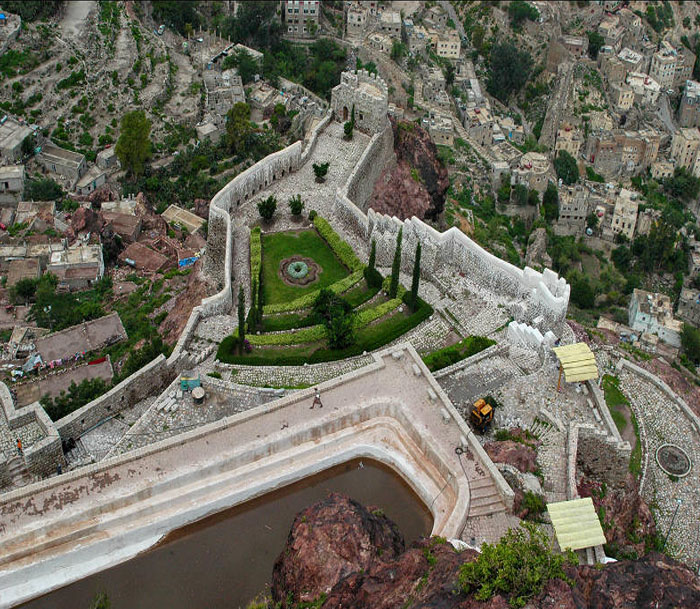
Al-Qahyra (Cairo) Castle's Garden in Taiz, the capital of Yemen during the Rasulid's era

The Rasulid Dynasty was established in 1229 by Umar ibn Rasul. Umar ibn Rasul was appointed deputy governor by the Ayyubids in 1223. When the last Ayyubid ruler left Yemen in 1229, Umar stayed in the country as caretaker. He subsequently declared himself an independent king by assuming the title al-Malik Al-Mansur (the king assisted by Allah). Umar established the Rasulid dynasty on a firm foundation and expanded its territory to include the area from Dhofar to Mecca. Umar first established himself at Zabid, then moved into the mountainous interior, taking the important highland centre Sanaa. However, the Rasulid capitals were Zabid and Taiz. He was assassinated by his nephew in 1249. Umar's son Yusuf defeated the faction led by his father's assassins and crushed several counter-attacks by the Zaydi imams who still held on in the northern highland. It was mainly because of the victories which he scored over his rivals that he assumed the honorific title al-Muzaffar (the victorious). After the fall of Baghdad to the Mongols in 1258, al-Muzaffar Yusuf I appropriated the title of caliph. He chose the city of Taiz to become the political capital of the kingdom because of its strategic location and proximity to Aden. Al-Muzaffar Yusuf I died in 1296 having reigned for 47 years. When the news of his death reached the Zaydi imam Al-Mutawakkil al-Mutahhar bin Yahya he commented by saying:

The greatest king of Yemen, the Muawiyah of the time, has died. His pens used to break our lances and swords to pieces.

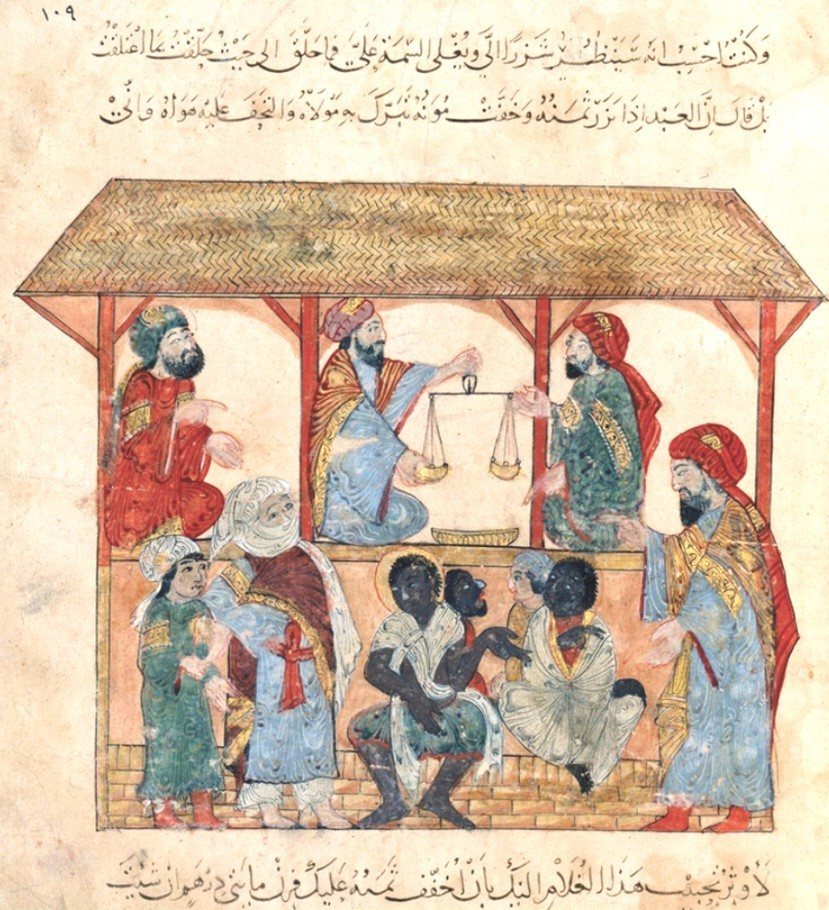
Slave-market in the town of Zabid in Yemen. Illustration from the 1237 Maqamat al-Hariri produced in Baghdad by al-Wasiti (Arabe 5847)

The Rasulid state nurtured Yemen's commercial links with India and the Far East. They profited greatly by the Red Sea transit trade via Aden and Zabid. The economy also boomed due to the agricultural development programs instituted by the kings who promoted massive cultivation of palms. It was during this period that coffee became a lucrative cash crop in Yemen. The Rasulid kings enjoyed the support of the population of Tihama and southern Yemen while they had to buy the loyalty of Yemen's restive northern highland tribes. The Rasulid sultans built numerous Madrasas in order to solidify the Shafi'i school of thought which is still the dominant school of jurisprudence amongst Yemenis today. Under their rule, Taiz and Zabid became major international centers of Islamic learning. The Kings themselves were learned men in their own right who not only had important libraries but who also wrote treatises on a wide array of subjects, ranging from astrology and medicine to agriculture and genealogy.

The dynasty is regarded as the greatest native Yemeni state since the fall of the pre-Islamic Himyarite Kingdom. Though the Rasulids were of Turkic descent they claimed an ancient Yemenite origin to justify their rule. The Rasulids were not the first dynasty to create a fictitious genealogy for political purposes, nor were they doing anything out of the ordinary in the tribal context of Arabia. By claiming descent from a solid Yemenite tribe, the Rasulid brought Yemen to a vital sense of unity in an otherwise chaotic regional milieu. They had a difficult relationship with the Mamluks of Egypt because the latter considered them a vassal state. Their competition centered over the Hejaz and the right to provide kiswa of the Ka'aba in Mecca. The dynasty became increasingly threatened by disgruntled family members over the problem of succession, combined by periodic tribal revolts, as they were locked in a war of attrition with the Zaydi imams in the northern highlands. During the last twelve years of Rasulid rule, the country was torn between several contenders for the kingdom. The weakening of the Rasulids provided an opportunity for the Banu Taher clan to take over and establish themselves as the new rulers of Yemen in 1454.

=== Tahirid Dynasty ===
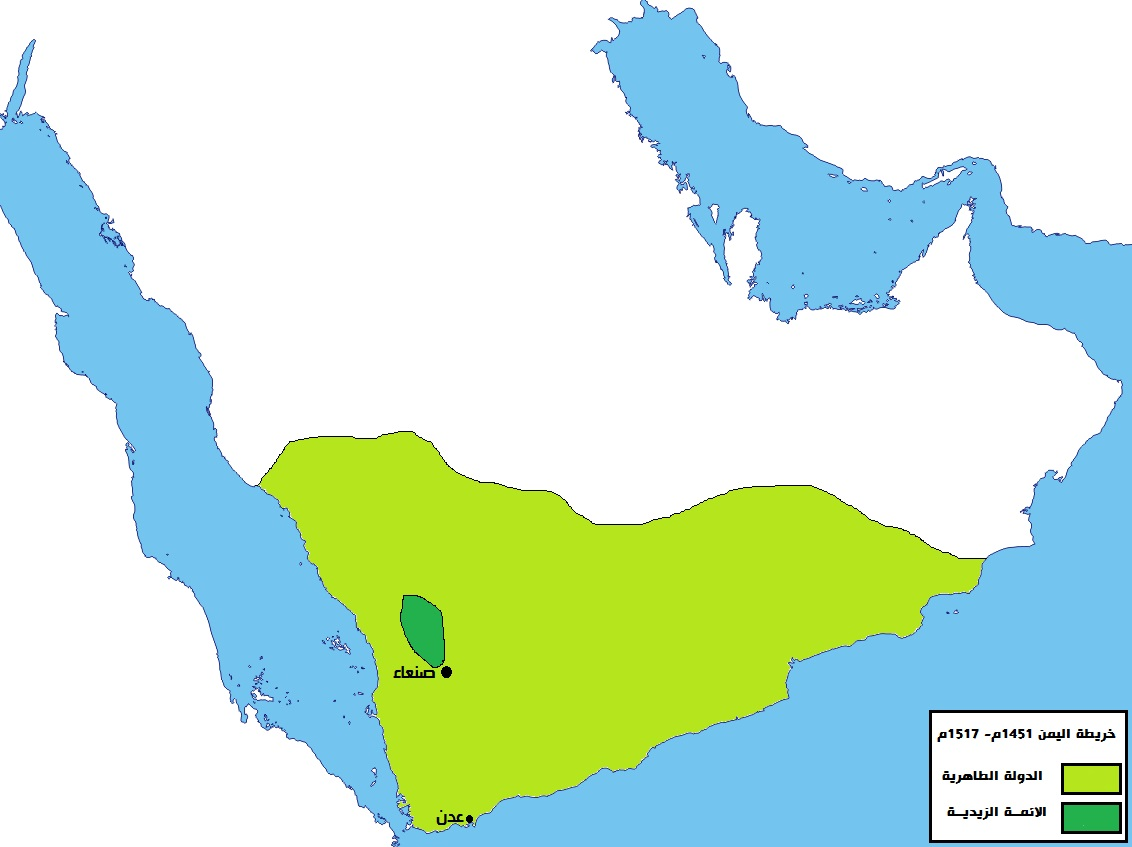
Tahirids in light green and Zaydi imams in dark green

The Tahirids were a local clan based in Rada'a. While they were not as impressive as their predecessors, they were still keen builders. They built schools, mosques and irrigation channels as well as water cisterns and bridges in Zabid and Aden, Rada'a, and Juban. Their best-known monument is the Amiriya Madrasa in Rada' which was built in 1504. The Tahiride were too weak either to contain the Zaydi Imams or to defend themselves against foreign attacks. The Mamluks of Egypt tried to attach Yemen to Egypt and the Portuguese, led by Afonso de Albuquerque, occupied Socotra and launched an unsuccessful four-day siege of Aden in 1513. The Portuguese posed an immediate threat to the Indian Ocean trade; the Mamluks of Egypt therefore sent an army under the command of Hussein Al-Kurdi to fight the intruders. The Mamluk sultan of Egypt sailed to Zabid in 1515 and began diplomatic talks with Tahiride Sultan 'Amir bin Abdulwahab for money that would be needed for jihad against the Portuguese. Instead of confronting the Portuguese, the Mamluks, who were running out of food and water, landed their fleet on the Yemen coastline and started to harass Tihama villagers for what they needed. Realizing how rich the Tahiride realm was, they decided to conquer it. The Mamluk army with the support of forces loyal to Zaydi Imam Al-Mutawakkil Yahya Sharaf ad-Din conquered the entire realm of the Tahiride but failed to capture Aden in 1517. The Mamluk victory turned out to be short-lived. The Ottoman Empire conquered Egypt, hanging the last Mamluk Sultan in Cairo. It was not until 1538 that the Ottomans decided to conquer Yemen. The Zaydi Highland tribes emerged as national heroes by offering a stiff, vigorous resistance to the Turkish occupation.

== Modern history ==
=== The Zaydis and Ottomans ===
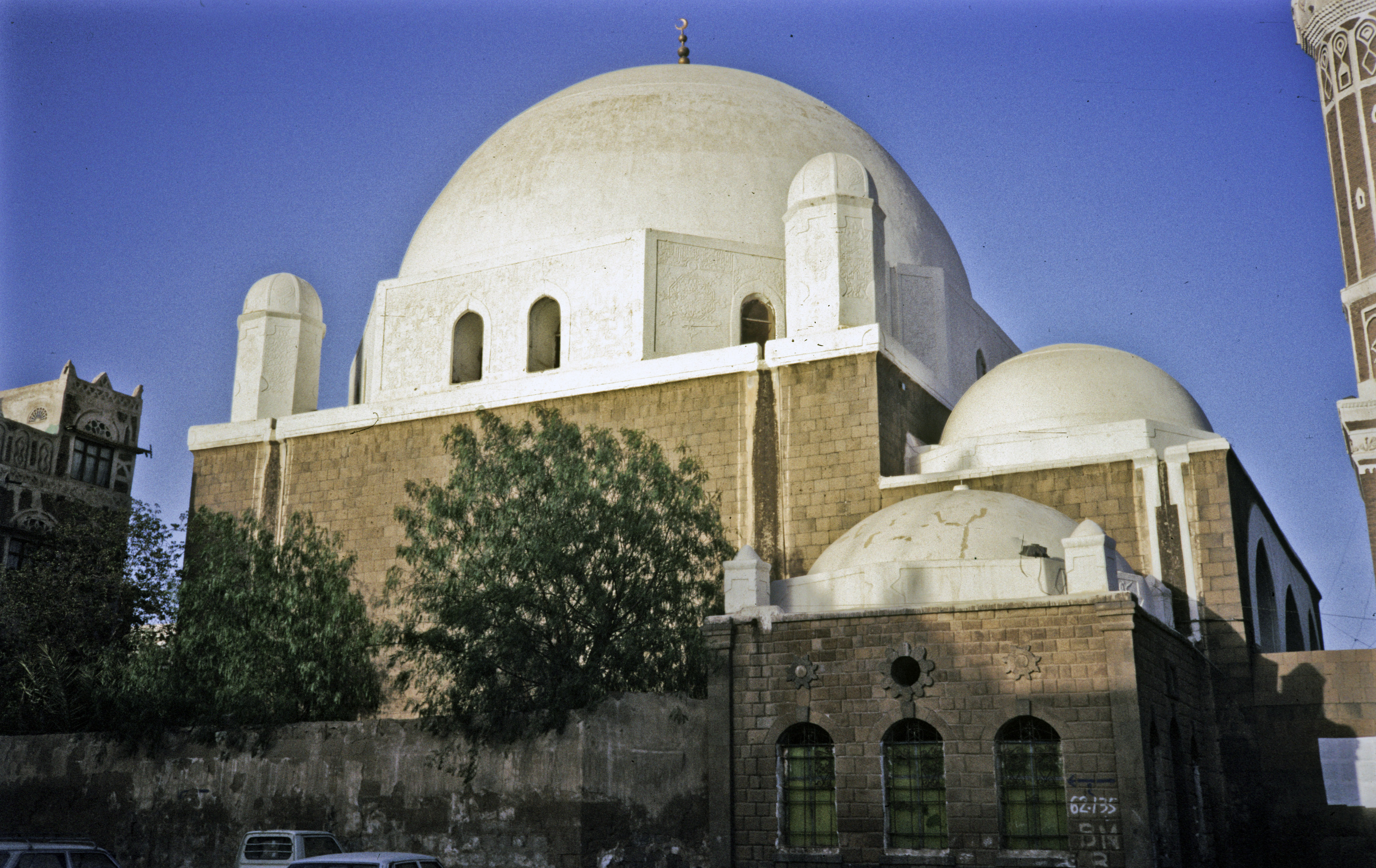
al-Bakiriyya Ottoman Mosque in Sanaa, was built in 1597

The Ottomans had two fundamental interests to safeguard in Yemen: The Islamic holy cities of Mecca and Medina and the trade route with India in spices and textiles, both of which were threatened and the latter virtually eclipsed by the arrival of the Portuguese in the Indian Ocean and the Red Sea in the early part of the 16th century. Hadım Suleiman Pasha, the Ottoman governor of Egypt, was ordered to command a fleet of 90 ships to conquer Yemen. The country was in a state of incessant anarchy and discord as Hadım Suleiman Pasha described it by saying:

Yemen is a land with no lord, an empty province. It would be not only possible but easy to capture, and should it be captured, it would be master of the lands of India and send every year a great amount of gold and jewels to Constantinople.

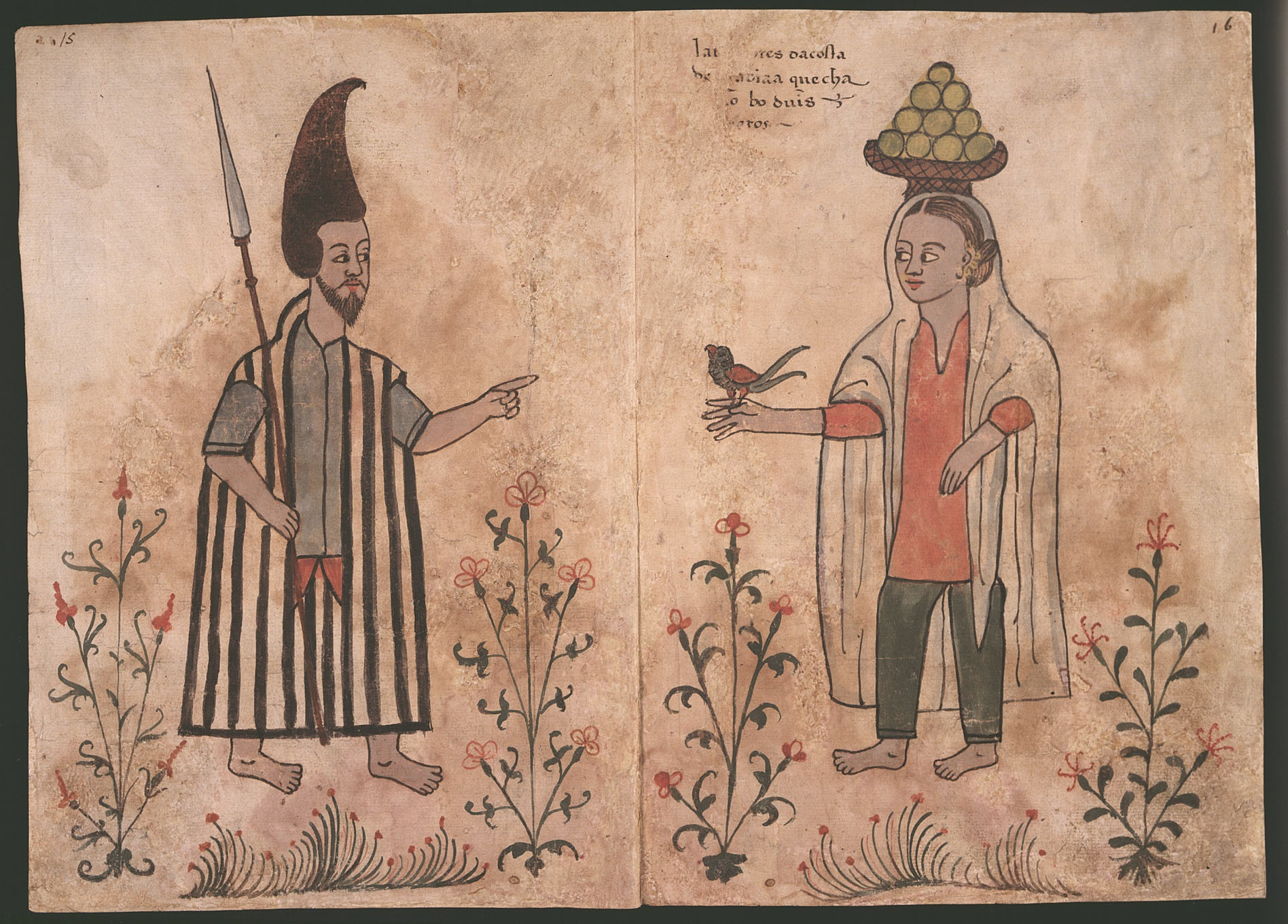
Arabian boduis farm couple, possibly Yemeni (Códice Casanatense, c. 1540)

Imam al-Mutawakkil Yahya Sharaf ad-Din ruled over the northern highlands including Sanaa while Aden was held by the last Tahiride Sultan 'Amir ibn Dauod. Hadım Suleiman Pasha stormed Aden in 1538, killing its ruler and extended Ottoman's authority to include Zabid in 1539 and eventually Tihama in its entirety. Zabid became the administrative headquarters of Yemen Eyalet. The Ottoman governors did not exercise much control over the highlands; they held sway mainly in the southern coastal region, particularly around Zabid, Mokha and Aden. Out of 80,000 soldiers sent to Yemen from Egypt between 1539 – 1547, only 7,000 survived. The Ottoman accountant-general in Egypt remarks:

We have seen no foundry like Yemen for our soldiers. Each time we have sent an expeditionary force there, it has melted away like salt dissolved in water.

The Ottoman sent yet another expeditionary force to Zabid in 1547 while Imam al-Mutawakkil Yahya Sharaf ad-Din was ruling the highlands independently. Imam al-Mutawakkil Yahya chose his son Ali to succeed him, a decision that infuriated his other son al-Mutahhar ibn Yahya. Al-Mutahhar was lame and therefore not qualified for the Imamate. He urged Oais Pasha, the Ottoman colonial governor in Zabid, to attack his father. Indeed, Ottoman troops supported by tribal forces loyal to Imam al-Mutahhar stormed Taiz and marched north toward Sanaa in August 1547. The Turks officially made Imam al-Mutahhar a Sanjak-bey with authority over 'Amran. Imam al-Mutahhar assassinated the Ottoman colonial governor and recaptured Sanaa but the Ottomans led by Özdemir Pasha, forced al-Mutahhar to retreat to his fortress in Thula. Özdemir Pasha effectively put Yemen under Ottoman rule between 1552 and 1560. He garrisoned the main cities, built new fortresses and rendered secure the main routes. Özdemir died in Sanaa in 1561 to be succeeded by Mahmud Pasha.

Mahmud Pasha was described by other Ottoman officials as corrupt and unscrupulous governor, he used his authority to take over a number of castles some of which belonged to the former Rasulid Kings. Mahmud Pasha killed a Sunni scholar from Ibb. The Ottoman historian claimed that this incident was celebrated by the Zaydi Shia community in the northern highlands. Disregarding the delicate balance of power in Yemen by acting tactlessly, he alienated different groups within Yemeni society, causing them to forget their rivalries and unite against the Turks. Mahmud Pasha was displaced by Ridvan Pasha in 1564. By 1565, Yemen was split into two provinces: the highlands under the command of Ridvan Pasha and Tihama under Murad Pasha. Imam al-Mutahhar launched a propaganda campaign in which he claimed contact with prophet Muhammad in a dream advising him to wage jihad against the Ottomans. Al-Mutahhar led the tribes to capture Sanaa from Ridvan Pasha in 1567. When Murad tried to relieve Sanaa, highland tribesmen ambushed his unit and slaughtered all of them. Over 80 battles were fought, the last decisive encounter took place in Dhamar around 1568 in which Murad Pasha was beheaded and had his head sent to al-Mutahhar in Sanaa. By 1568, only Zabid remained under the possession of the Turks.

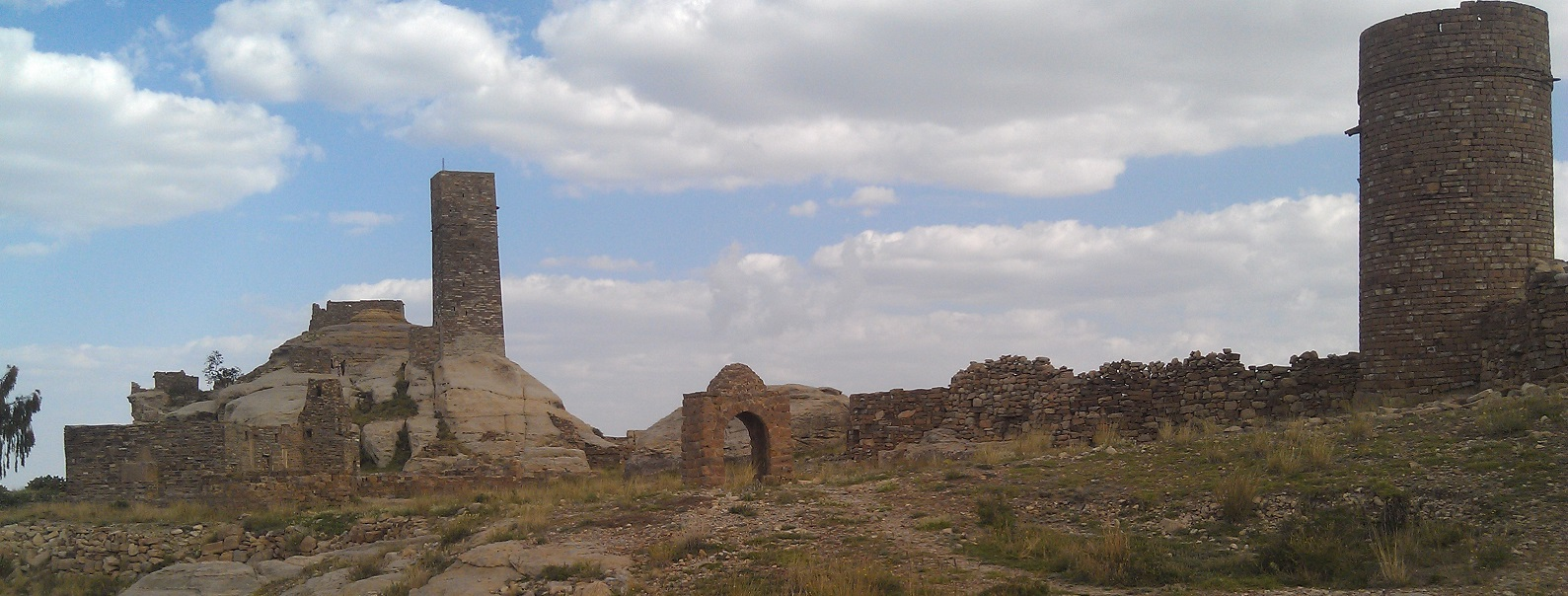
Ruins of Thula fortress in 'Amran, where al-Mutahhar ibn Yaha barricaded himself against Ottoman attacks.

Lala Kara Mustafa Pasha, the Ottoman governor of Syria, was ordered by Selim II to suppress the Yemeni rebels, the Turkish army in Egypt was reluctant to go to Yemen however. Mustafa Pasha sent a letter with two Turkish shawishes hoping to persuade al-Mutahhar to give an apology and say that he did not promote any act of aggression against the Ottoman army, and claim that the ignorant Arabians according to the Turks, acted on their own. Imam al-Mutahhar refused the Ottoman offer. Mustafa Pasha sent an expeditionary force under the command of Uthman Pasha, the expeditionary force was defeated with great casualties. Sultan Selim II was infuriated by Mustafa's hesitation to go Yemen, he executed a number of sanjak-beys in Egypt and ordered Sinan Pasha to lead the entire Turkish army in Egypt to reconquer Yemen. Sinan Pasha was a prominent Ottoman General of Albanian origin. In 1570, he reconquered Aden, Taiz, and Ibb, and he besieged Shibam Kawkaban for 7 months until a truce was reached. Imam al-Mutahhar was pushed back but could not be entirely overcome. After al-Mutahhar's demise in 1572, the Zaydi community was not united under an imam; the Turks took advantage of their disparity and conquered Sanaa, Sa'dah and Najran in 1583. Imam al-Nasir Hassan was arrested in 1585 and exiled to Constantinople, thereby putting an end to the Yemeni rebellion.

The Zaydi tribesmen in the northern highlands, particularly those of Hashid and Bakil, were a constant irritant to Turkish rule in Arabia. Justifying their presence in Yemen as a triumph for Islam, the Ottomans accused the Zaydis of being infidels. Hassan Pasha was appointed governor of Yemen, which enjoyed a period of relative peace from 1585 to 1597. Pupils of al-Mansur al-Qasim suggested that he claim the immamate and fight the Turks. He declined at first but was infuriated by the promotion of the Hanafi school of jurisprudence at the expense of Zaydi Islam. He proclaimed the Imamate in September 1597, which was the same year the Ottoman authorities inaugurated al-Bakiriyya Mosque. By 1608, Imam al-Mansur (the victorious) regained control over the highlands and signed a 10-year truce with the Ottomans. When Imam al-Mansur al-Qasim died in 1620 his son Al-Mu'ayyad Muhammad succeeded him and confirmed the truce with the Ottomans. In 1627, the Ottomans lost Aden and Lahej. 'Abdin Pasha was ordered to suppress the rebels but failed and had to retreat to Mokha. After Al-Mu'ayyad Muhammad expelled the Ottomans from Sanaa in 1628, only Zabid and Mokha remained under Ottoman possession. Al-Mu'ayyad Muhammad captured Zabid in 1634 and allowed the Ottomans to leave Mokha peacefully. The reasons behind Al-Mu'ayyad Muhammad's success were the tribes' possession of firearms and the fact that they were unified behind him.

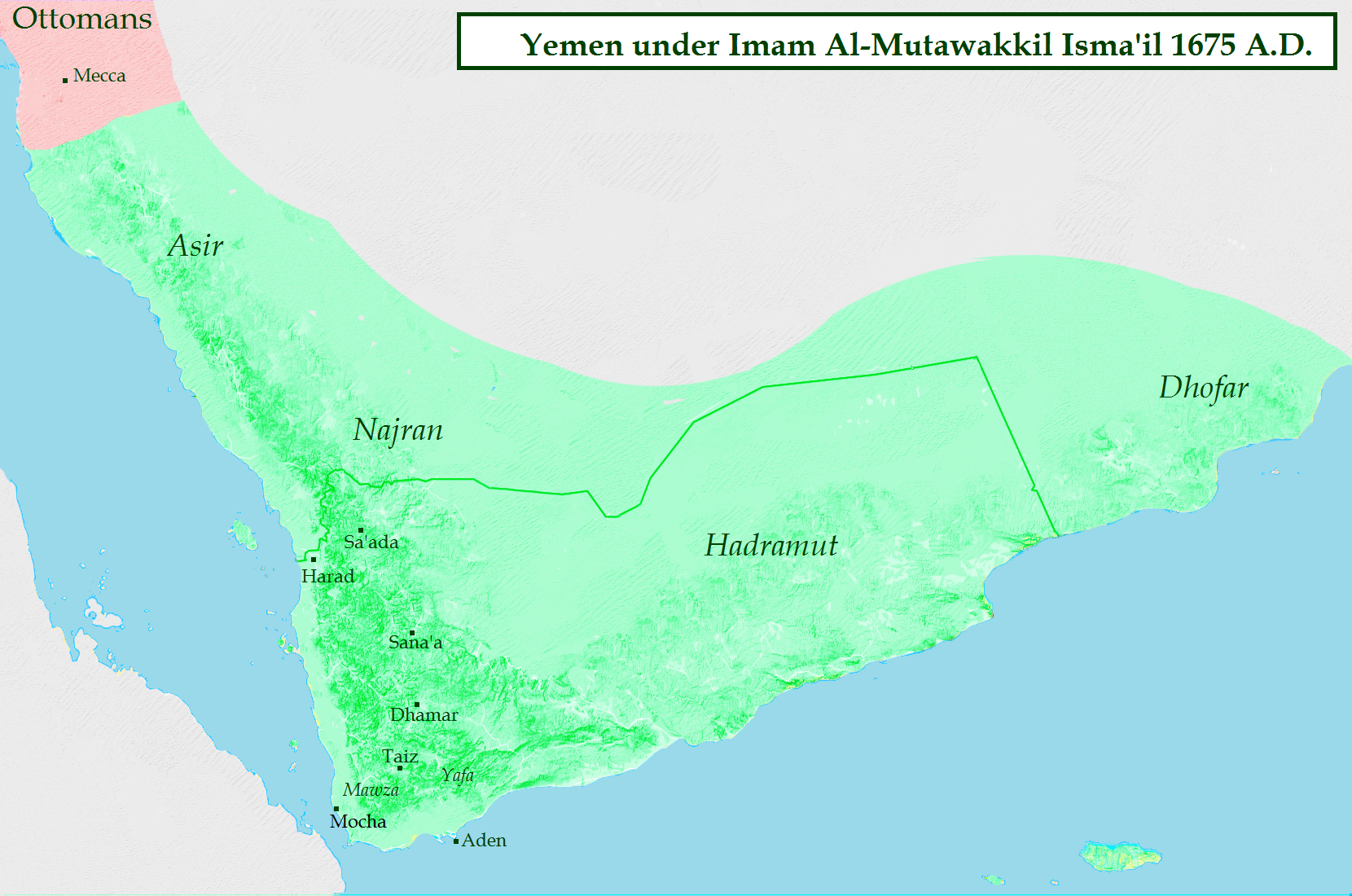
Zaidi State under the rule of Al-Mutawakkil Isma'il (1675)

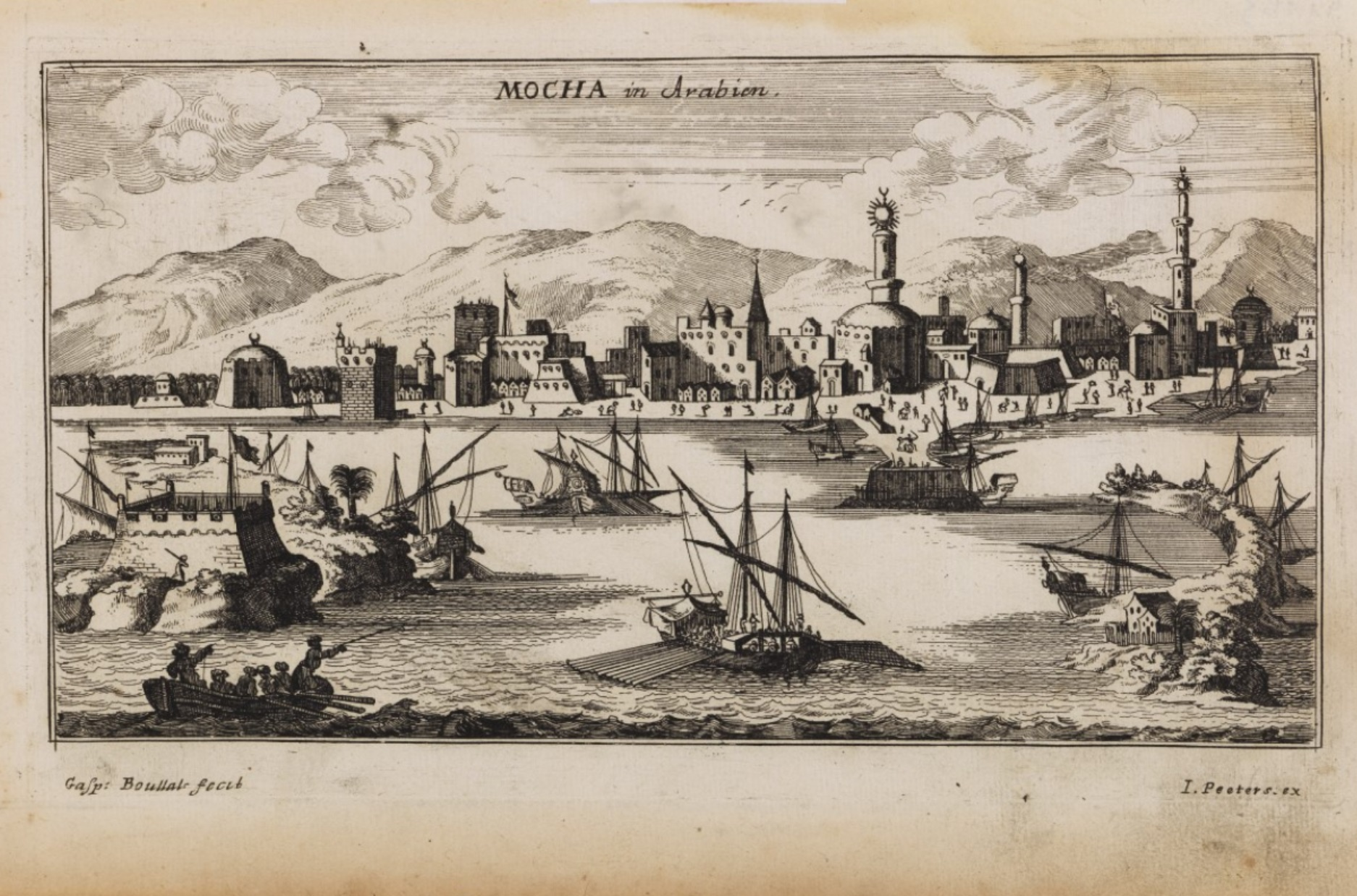
Mokha was Yemen's busiest port in the 17th and 18th century.

In 1632, Al-Mu'ayyad Muhammad sent an expeditionary force of 1000 men to conquer Mecca. The army entered the city in triumph and killed its governor. The Ottomans were not ready to lose Mecca after Yemen, so they sent an army from Egypt to fight the Yemenites. Seeing that the Turkish army was too numerous to overcome, the Yemeni army retreated to a valley outside Mecca. Ottoman troops attacked the Yemenis by hiding at the wells that supplied them with water. This plan proceeded successfully, causing the Yemenis over 200 casualties, most from thirst. The tribesmen eventually surrendered and returned to Yemen. Al-Mu'ayyad Muhammad died in 1644. He was succeeded by Al-Mutawakkil Isma'il, another son of al-Mansur al-Qasim, who conquered Yemen in its entirety, from Asir in the north to Dhofar in the east. During his reign and that of his successor, Al-Mahdi Ahmad (1676–1681), the Imamate implemented some of the harshest discriminatory laws (Ar. ghiyar) against the Jews of Yemen, which culminated in the expulsion of all Jews to a hot and arid region in the Tihama coastal plain. The Qasimid state was the strongest Zaydi state to ever exist.

During that period, Yemen was the sole Coffee producer in the world. The country established diplomatic relations with the Safavid dynasty of Persia, the Ottomans of Hejaz, the Mughal Empire in India and Ethiopia. The emperor Fasilides of Ethiopia sent three diplomatic missions to Yemen, but relations did not develop into a political alliance as Fasilides had hoped, due to the rise of powerful feudalists in the country. In the first half of the 18th century, the Europeans broke Yemen's monopoly on coffee by smuggling out coffee trees and cultivating them in their own colonies in the East Indies, East Africa, the West Indies and Latin America. The imammate did not follow a cohesive mechanism for succession, and family quarrels and tribal insubordination led to the political decline of the Qasimi dynasty in the 18th century. In 1728 or 1731 the chief representative of Lahej declared himself an independent Sultan in defiance of the Qasimid Dynasty and conquered Aden thus establishing the Sultanate of Lahej. The rising power of the fervently Islamist Wahhabi movement on the Arabian Peninsula cost the Zaidi state its coastal possessions after 1803. The imam was able to regain them temporarily in 1818, but new intervention by the Ottoman viceroy of Egypt in 1833 again wrested the coast from the ruler in Sanaa. After 1835 the imamate changed hands with great frequency and some imams were assassinated. After 1849 the Zaidi polity descended into chaos that lasted for decades.

=== United Kingdom and the nine regions ===
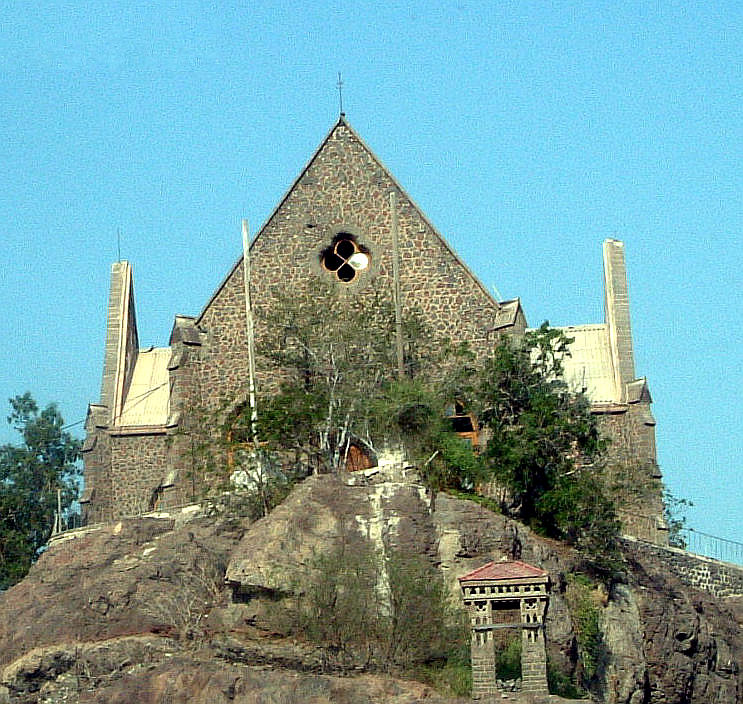
Saint Mary's Garrison church in Aden was built by the British in 1850 and is currently abandoned.

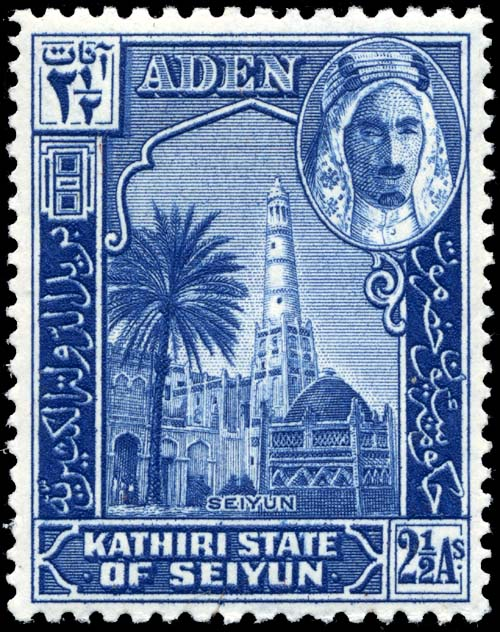
Postage stamp of the Kathiri state of Sai'yun with portrait of Sultan Jafar bin Mansur. Kathiri is Kingdom of Hadhramaut Protected/Controlled British Empire.

Flag of the Colony of Aden.

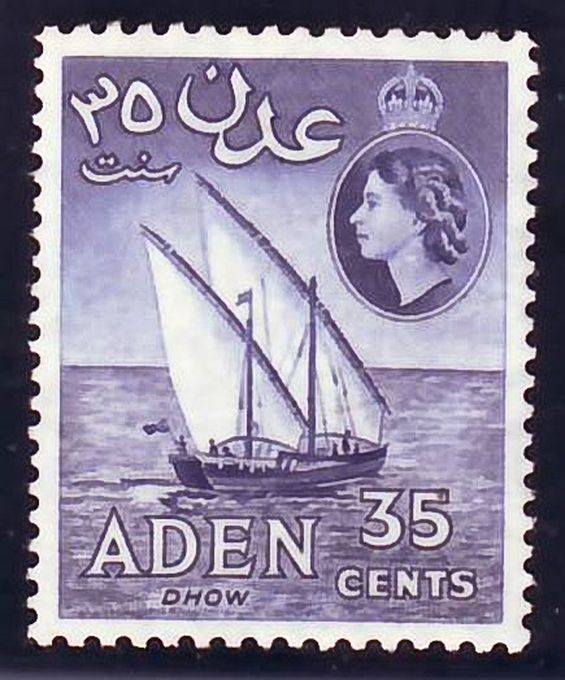
Queen Elizabeth II and Gulf of Aden at Yemen 35 cent Stamp.

The British were looking for a coal depot to service their steamers en route to India. It took 700 tons of coal for a round-trip from Suez to Bombay. East India Company officials decided on Aden. London tried to reach an agreement with the Zaydi imam of Sanaa permitting them a foothold in Mokha; and when unable to secure their position, they extracted a similar agreement from the Sultan of Lahej, enabling them to consolidate a position in Aden.

An incident played into British hands when, while passing Aden for trading purposes, one of their sailing ships sank and Arab tribesmen boarded it and plundered its contents. The British India government dispatched a warship under the command of Captain Stafford Bettesworth Haines to demand compensation. Haines bombarded Aden from his warship in January 1839. The ruler of Lahej, who was in Aden at the time, ordered his guards to defend the port, but they failed in the face of overwhelming military and naval power. The British managed to occupy Aden and agreed to compensate the sultan with an annual payment of 6000 riyals. The British evicted the Sultan of Lahej from Aden and forced him to accept their "protection". In November 1839, 5000 tribesmen tried to retake the town but were repulsed and 200 were killed. The British realized that Aden's prosperity depended on their relations with the neighboring tribes, which required that they rest on a firm and satisfactory basis.

The British government concluded "protection and friendship" treaties with nine tribes surrounding Aden, whereas they would remain independent from British interference in their affairs as long as they do not conclude treaties with foreigners (non-Arab colonial powers). Aden was declared a free zone in 1850. With emigrants from India, East Africa and Southeast Asia, Aden grew into a "world city". In 1850, only 980 Arabs were registered as original inhabitants of the city. The English presence in Aden put them at odds with the Ottomans. The Turks asserted to the British that they held sovereignty over the whole of Arabia, including Yemen as successor of Muhammad and the chief of the universal Caliphate.

=== Ottoman return ===
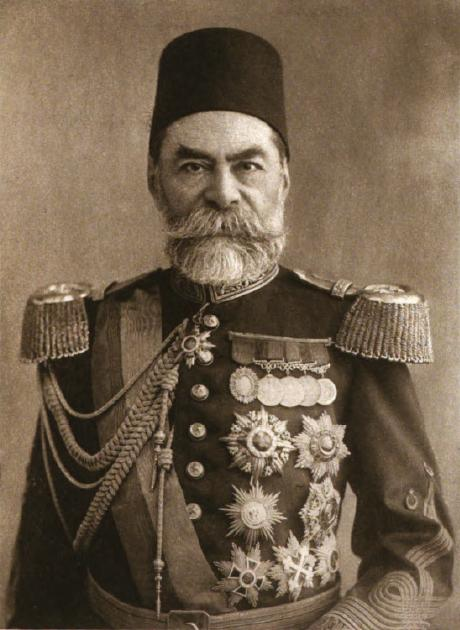
The Ottoman Grand Vizier and Wāli (Governor) of Yemen Ahmed Muhtar Pasha

The Ottomans were concerned about the British expansion from India to the Red Sea and Arabia. They returned to the Tihama in 1849 after an absence of two centuries. Rivalries and disturbances continued among the Zaydi imams, between them and their deputies, with the ulema, with the heads of tribes, as well as with those who belonged to other sects. Some citizens of Sanaa were desperate to return law and order to Yemen and asked the Ottoman Pasha in Tihama to pacify the country. Yemeni merchants knew that the return of the Ottomans would improve their trade, for the Ottomans would become their customers. An Ottoman expedition force tried to capture Sanaa but was defeated and had to evacuate the highlands. The opening of the Suez Canal in 1869 strengthened the Ottomans' decision to remain in Yemen. In 1872, military forces were dispatched from Constantinople and moved beyond the Ottoman stronghold in the lowlands (Tihama) to conquer Sanaa. By 1873 the Ottomans succeeded in conquering the northern highlands. Sanaa became the administrative capital of Yemen Vilayet.

The Ottomans learned from their previous experience and worked on the disempowerment of local lords in the highland regions. They even attempted to secularize the Yemeni society; Yemenite Jews came to perceive themselves in Yemeni nationalist terms. The Ottomans appeased the tribes by forgiving their rebellious chiefs and appointing them to administrative posts. They introduced a series of reforms to enhance the country's economic welfare. On the other hand, corruption was widespread in the Ottoman administration in Yemen. This stemmed from the fact that only the worst of the officials were appointed because those who could avoid serving in Yemen did so. The Ottomans had reasserted control over the highlands for temporary duration. The so-called Tanzimat reforms were considered heretic by the Zaydi tribes. In 1876, the Hashid and Bakil tribes rebelled against the Ottomans, and the Turks had to appease them with gifts to end the uprising.

The tribal chiefs were difficult to appease and an endless cycle of violence curbed the Ottoman efforts to pacify the land. Ahmed Izzet Pasha proposed that the Ottoman army should evacuate the highlands and confined itself to Tihama and not to be unnecessarily burdened with continuing military operation against the Zaydi tribes. The hit-and-run tactics of the northern highlands tribesmen wore out the Ottoman military. They resented the Turkish Tanzimat and defied all attempts to impose a central government upon them. The northern tribes united under the leadership of the House of Hamidaddin in 1890.

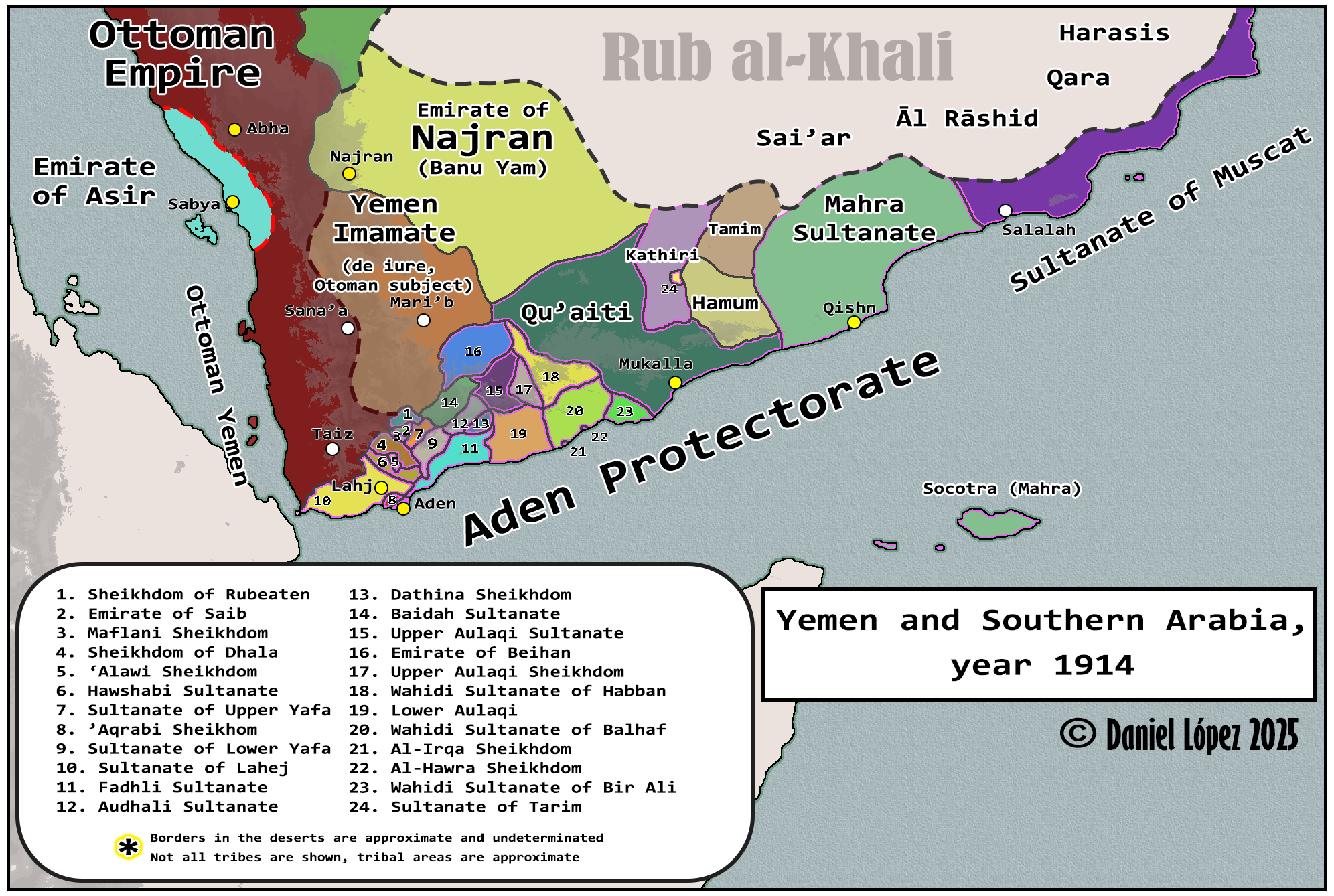
Map of Yemen and its environs on the eve of World War I

Imam Yahya Hamidaddin led a rebellion against the Turks in 1904, the rebels disrupted the Ottoman ability to govern. The revolts between 1904 and 1911 were especially damaging to the Ottomans, costing them as much as 10,000 soldiers and £500,000 per year. The Ottomans signed a treaty with imam Yahya Hamidaddin in 1911. Under the treaty, imam Yahya was recognized as an autonomous leader of the Zaydi northern highlands. The Ottomans continued to rule Shafi'i areas in the mid-south until their departure in 1918.

=== Idrisid Emirate and Mutawakkilite Kingdom of Yemen ===
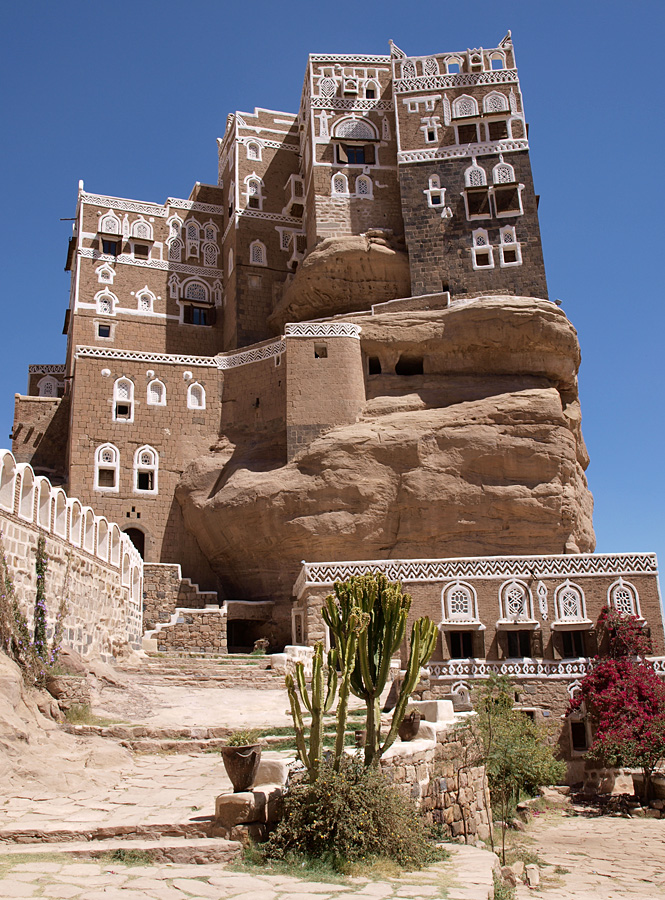
Imam Yahya hamid ed-Din's house in Sanaa

Imam Yahya hamid ed-Din al-Mutawakkil was ruling the northern highlands independently since 1911. After the Ottoman departure in 1918 he sought to recapture the lands of his Qasimid ancestors. He dreamed of Greater Yemen stretching from Asir to Dhofar. These schemes brought him into conflict with the de facto rulers in the territories claimed, namely the Idrisids, Ibn Saud and the British government in Aden. The Zaydi imam did not recognize the Anglo-Ottoman border agreement of 1905 on the grounds that it was made between two foreign powers occupying Yemen. The border treaty effectively divided Yemen into "north" and "south". In 1915 the British signed a treaty with the Idrisids guaranteeing their security and independence if they would fight against the Turks. In 1919, Imam Yahya moved southward to liberate the nine British protectorates. (See Anglo-Yemeni War) The British responded by moving quickly towards Tihama and occupying Al Hudaydah. Then they handed it over to their Idrisi allies. Imam Yahya attacked the southern protectorates again in 1922. The British bombed Yahya's tribal forces using aircraft to which the tribes had no effective counter.

In 1925, Imam Yahya captured Al Hudaydah from the Idrisids. He continued to follow and attack the Idrisids until Asir fell under the control of the Imam's forces, forcing the Idrisids to request an agreement that would enable them to administer the region in the name of the Imam. Imam Yahya refused the offer on the grounds that the Idrisis were of a Moroccan descent. According to Imam Yahya, the Idrisids, along with the British, were nothing but recent intruders and ought to be driven out of Yemen permanently. In 1927, when Imam Yahya's forces were 50 km away from Aden, Taiz and Ibb were bombed by the British for five days, and the Imam had to pull back. Small Bedouin forces mainly from the Madh'hij confederation of Marib, attacked Shabwah but were bombed by the British and had to retreat.

The Italian Empire was the first to recognize Imam Yahya as the King of Yemen in 1926. Furthermore, the Italians in 1926 and 1927 aimed at taking control of the Farasan Islands. Italy had colonies of its own in the region: Eritrea and Somaliland, both of low profitability. There was expectation that increased ties with Yemen would fuel increased trade with the colonies and bring the region into the Italian sphere of influence. The Kingdom of Yemen at this point had its eye on annexing Aden and Imam Yahya also had aspirations for a Greater Yemen, with the possible help from Italy.

This created a great deal of anxiety for the British, who interpreted it as clear recognition of Imam Yahya's claim to sovereignty over Greater Yemen which included the Aden protectorate and Asir.

The Idrisids turned to Ibn Saud seeking his protection from Yahya. In 1932, however, the Idrisids broke their accord with Ibn Saud and went back to Imam Yahya seeking help against Ibn Saud himself, who had begun liquidating their authority and expressed his desire to annex those territories into his own Saudi domain. Imam Yahya demanded the return of all Idrisi dominion. That same year, a group of Hejazi liberals fled to Yemen and plotted to expel Ibn Saud from the former Hashemite Kingdom of Hejaz which was conquered by the Saudis seven years earlier. Ibn Saud appealed to Britain for aid. The British government sent arms and airplanes. The British were anxious that Ibn Saud's financial difficulties may encourage the Italian Empire to bail him out. Ibn Saud suppressed the Asiri rebellion in 1933, after which the Idrisids fled to Sanaa. Negotiations between the Imam Yahya and Ibn Saud proved fruitless. After a military confrontation, Ibn Saud announced a ceasefire in May 1934. Imam Yahya agreed to release Saudi hostages and the surrender of the Idrisis to Saudi custody. Imam Yahya ceded the three provinces of Najran, Asir and Jazan for 20 years and signed another treaty with the British government in 1934. The Imam recognized the British sovereignty over Aden protectorate for 40 years. Yahya submitted to the Saudi and British demands out of fear for Al Hudaydah. According to Bernard Reich, Professor of Political Science and International Affairs at George Washington University, Yahya could have done better by reorganizing the Zaidi tribes of the northern highlands as his ancestors did against the Turks and British intruders and turn the lands they captured into another graveyard.

Although the imamate lost Asir, it was able to put down rebel tribes in the north using Iraq-trained Yemeni troops. With the country, now established within clearly defined territory, finally pacified, the urban nationalists began to assert themselves. These nationalists had long practiced non-Zaidi traditions (especially Shafi'i), and were centered in the coastal province of Tahama, the city of Taiz and the British-occupied Aden. Many had been students in Cairo and had acquired connections with the Muslim Brotherhood and Algerian nationalists. Muslim Brotherhood operatives in Yemen aligned themselves with the urban opposition and supported Zaidi prince Abdullah bin Ahmad al-Wazir, who joined those actively seeking to overthrow Imam Yahya. On February 17, 1948, the opposition revolted in Sanaa and killed Imam Yahya. Crown prince Ahmad was able to rally northern tribes and retake the capital, quelling the revolt after a brief siege on March 12, 1948.

Imam Ahmad reversed the isolationist policies of his father and opened Yemen's economy and society to the outside world. It went as the theocratic and largely medieval Imamate which became the first Arab state to accept Soviet aid. Beginning in 1955 Yemen entered into various treaties of friendship and from 1957 began receiving large amounts of Soviet arms as well as Soviet and Chinese military advisers. When the imam went abroad owing to illness, crown prince Muhammad al-Badr led a pro-Soviet party and communist activity increased. When the Imam returned in 1959, brutal repression ensued and communists were expelled.

In April 1956 Yemen joined a defensive pact with Syria and Egypt, and in February 1958 it federated with the United Arab Republic. In parallel, clan violence erupted in Yemen and Aden, claiming hundreds of lives over 1956–60. The defensive pact move was conceived as a defensive measure against republican agitation, which urban nationalists still engaged in from British-occupied Aden. So long as Yemen was federated with the UAR, republicans would be deprived any assistance from Egyptian President Nasser. Although the federation lasted only for three years, crown prince al-Badr continued to portray himself as an Arab patriot, often railing against "reactionary Arab monarchs."

== Two states ==
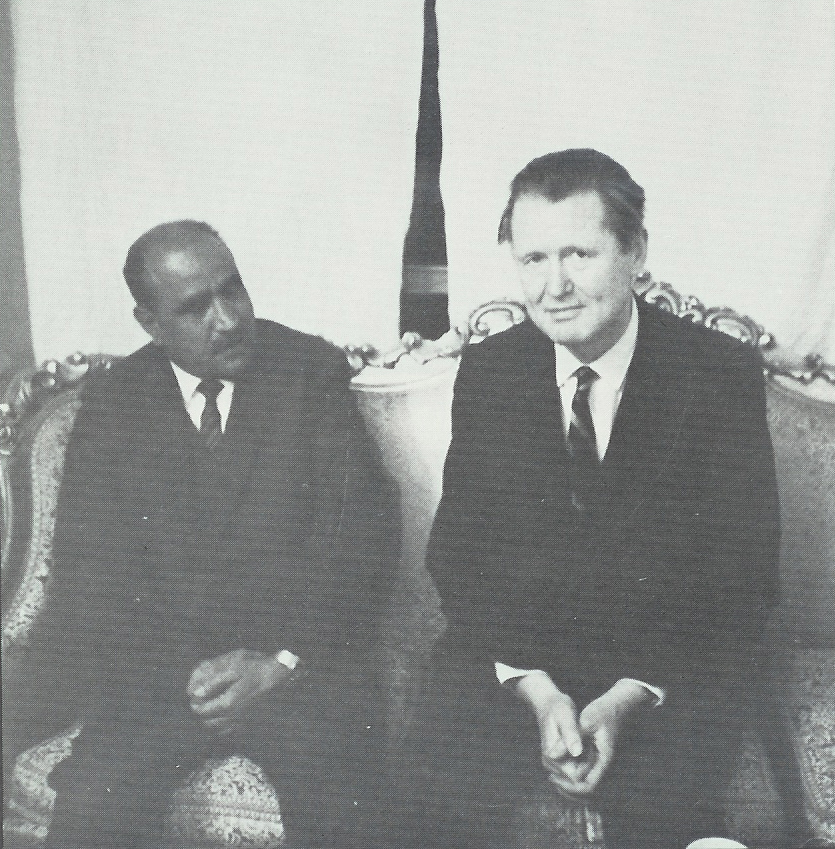
Abdullah as-Sallal, North Yemen President and Dana Adams Schmidt.

Arab nationalism influenced some circles that pushed for the modernization of the Mutawakkilite monarchy. This became apparent when Imam Ahmad bin Yahya died in 1962. He was succeeded by his son, but army officers attempted to seize power, sparking the North Yemen Civil War. The Hamidaddin royalists were supported by Saudi Arabia, Britain, and Jordan (mostly with weapons and financial aid, but also with small military forces), whilst the republicans were backed by Egypt. Egypt provided the republicans with weapons and financial assistance but also sent a large military force to participate in the fighting. Israel covertly supplied weapons to the royalists in order to keep the Egyptian military busy in Yemen and make Nasser less likely to initiate a conflict in Sinai. After six years of civil war, the republicans were victorious (February 1968) and formed the Yemen Arab Republic.

The revolution in the north coincided with the Aden Emergency, which hastened the end of British rule in the south. On 30 November 1967, the state of South Yemen was formed, comprising Aden and the former Protectorate of South Arabia. This socialist state was later officially known as the People's Democratic Republic of Yemen and a programme of nationalisation was begun.

Relations between the two Yemeni states fluctuated between peaceful and hostile. The South was supported by the Eastern bloc. The North, however, was unable to get the same connections. In 1972, the two states fought a war. The war was resolved with a ceasefire and negotiations brokered by the Arab League, where it was declared that unification would eventually occur. In 1978, Ali Abdallah Saleh was named as president of the Yemen Arab Republic. After the war, the North complained about the South's help from foreign countries, which included Saudi Arabia. In 1979, fighting erupted between the North and the South. There were renewed efforts to unite the two states.

Women's rights under the socialist government were considered the best in the region. Women became legally equal to men and were encouraged to work in public; polygamy, child marriage, and arranged marriage were all banned; and equal rights in divorce received legal sanction.

In 1986, thousands died in the South, when a civil war erupted between supporters of former president Abdul Fattah Ismail and his successor, Ali Nasser Muhammad. Ali Nasser Muhammad fled the country and was later sentenced to death for treason.

== Unification ==
In 1990, the two governments reached a full agreement on the joint governing of Yemen, and the countries were merged on 22 May 1990 with Saleh as president. The President of South Yemen, Ali Salem al-Beidh, became vice-president. A unified parliament was formed and a unity constitution was agreed upon. In the 1993 parliamentary election, the first held after unification, the General People's Congress won 122 of 301 seats.

After the invasion of Kuwait crisis in 1990, Yemen's president opposed military intervention from non-Arab states. As a member of the United Nations Security Council for 1990 and 1991, Yemen abstained on a number of UNSC resolutions concerning Iraq and Kuwait and voted against the "use of force resolution". The vote outraged the U.S. Saudi Arabia expelled 800,000 Yemenis in 1990 and 1991 to punish Yemen for its opposition to the war.

Following food riots in major towns in 1992, a new coalition government made up of the ruling parties from both the former Yemeni states was formed in 1993. However, vice-president al-Beidh withdrew to Aden in August 1993 and said he would not return to the government until his grievances were addressed. These included northern violence against his Yemeni Socialist Party, as well as the economic marginalization of the south. Negotiations to end the political deadlock dragged on into 1994. The government of Prime Minister Haydar Abu Bakr Al-Attas became ineffective due to political infighting

An accord between northern and southern leaders was signed in Amman, Jordan on 20 February 1994, but this could not stop the civil war. During these tensions, both the northern and southern armies (which had never integrated) gathered on their respective frontiers. The May – July 1994 civil war in Yemen resulted in the defeat of the southern armed forces and the flight into exile of many Yemeni Socialist Party leaders and other southern secessionists. Saudi Arabia actively aided the south during the 1994 civil war.

Saleh became Yemen's first directly elected president in the 1999 presidential election, winning 96.2% of the vote. The only other candidate, Najeeb Qahtan Al-Sha'abi, was the son of Qahtan Muhammad al-Shaabi, a former President of South Yemen. Though a member of Saleh's General People's Congress (GPC) party, Najeeb ran as an independent.

In June 2000, the Treaty of Jeddah was signed, defining the border with Saudi Arabia.

In October 2000, seventeen U.S. personnel died after a suicide attack on the U.S. naval vessel USS Cole in Aden which was subsequently blamed on al-Qaeda. After the September 11 attacks on the United States, President Saleh assured U.S. President George W. Bush that Yemen was a partner in his war on terror. In 2001, there was violence surrounding a referendum which apparently supported extending Saleh's rule and powers.

The Shia insurgency in Yemen began in June 2004 when dissident cleric Hussein Badreddin al-Houthi, head of the Zaidi Shia sect, launched an uprising against the Yemeni government. The Yemeni government alleged that the Houthis were seeking to overthrow it and to implement Shī'a religious law. The rebels counter that they are "defending their community against discrimination" and government aggression.

In 2005, at least 36 people were killed in clashes across the country between police and protesters over rising fuel prices.

In the 2006 presidential election, held on 20 September, Saleh won with 77.2% of the vote. His main rival, Faisal bin Shamlan, received 21.8%. Saleh was sworn in for another term on 27 September.

A suicide bomber killed eight Spanish tourists and two Yemenis in the province of Marib in July 2007. There was a series of bomb attacks on police, official, diplomatic, foreign business and tourism targets in 2008. Car bombings outside the U.S. embassy in Sanaa killed 18 people, including six of the assailants in September 2008. In 2008, an opposition rally in Sanaa demanding electoral reform was met with police gunfire.

=== Al Qaeda ===
In January 2009, the Saudi and Yemeni al-Qaeda branches merged to form Al-Qaeda in the Arabian Peninsula (AQAP). Al Qaeda in the Arabian Peninsula is based in Yemen, and many of its members were Saudi nationals who had been released from Guantanamo Bay. Saleh released 176 al-Qaeda suspects on condition of good behaviour, but terrorist activities continued.

The Yemeni army launched a fresh offensive against the Shia insurgents in 2009, assisted by Saudi forces. Tens of thousands of people were displaced by the fighting. A new ceasefire was agreed upon in February 2010. However, by the end of the year, Yemen claimed that 3,000 soldiers had been killed in renewed fighting. The Shia rebels accused Saudi Arabia of providing support to salafi groups to suppress Zaidism in Yemen. Saleh's government used Al-Qaeda in its wars against the insurgent Houthis clan.

Some news reports have suggested that, on orders from U.S. President Barack Obama, U.S. warplanes fired cruise missiles at what officials in Washington claimed were Al Qaeda training camps in the provinces of Sanaa and Abyan on 17 December 2009. Instead of hitting Al-Qaeda operatives, it hit a village killing 55 civilians. Officials in Yemen said that the attacks claimed the lives of more than 60 civilians, 28 of them children. Another airstrike was carried out on 24 December.

The U.S. launched a series of drone attacks in Yemen to curb a perceived growing terror threat due to political chaos in Yemen. Since December 2009, U.S. strikes in Yemen have been carried out by the U.S. military with intelligence support from CIA. The drone strikes are protested by human-rights groups who say they kill innocent civilians and that the U.S. military and CIA drone strikes lack sufficient congressional oversight, including the choice of human targets suspected of being threats to America. Controversy over U.S. policy for drone attacks mushroomed after a September 2011 drone strike in Yemen killed Anwar al-Awlaki and Samir Khan, both U.S. citizens. Another drone strike in October 2011 killed Anwar's teenage son, Abdulrahman al-Awlaki.

In 2010 the Obama administration policy allowed targeting of people whose names are not known. The U.S. government increased military aid to $140 million in 2010. U.S. drone strikes continued after the ousting of President Saleh.

=== Government instability 2011–present ===
The Yemeni Crisis began with the 2011–12 revolution against President Ali Abdullah Saleh, who had led Yemen for more than two decades. After Saleh left office in early 2012 as part of a mediated agreement between the Yemeni government and opposition groups, the government led by Saleh's former vice president, Abd Rabbuh Mansur Hadi, struggled to unite the fractious political landscape of the country and fend off threats both from Al Qaeda in the Arabian Peninsula and Houthi militants that had been waging a protracted insurgency in the north for years. In 2014, Houthi fighters swept into the capital of Sanaa and forced Hadi to negotiate a "unity government" with other political factions. The rebels continued to apply pressure on the weakened government until, after his presidential palace and private residence came under attack from the militant group, Hadi resigned along with his ministers in January 2015. The following month, the Houthis declared themselves in control of the government, dissolving Parliament and installing an interim Revolutionary Committee led by Mohammed Ali al-Houthi, a cousin of Houthi leader Abdul-Malik al-Houthi. However, Hadi escaped to Aden, where he declared he remains Yemen's legitimate president, proclaimed the country's temporary capital, and called on loyal government officials and members of the military to rally to him.

==== 2011 revolution ====
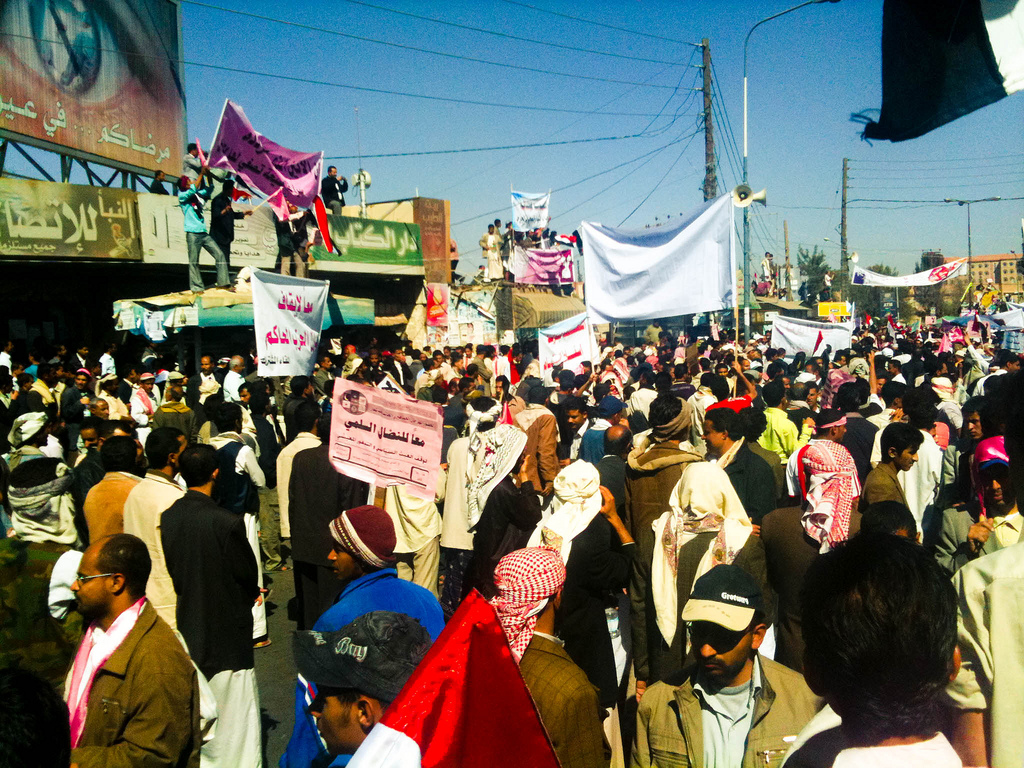
Protest in Sanaa, 3 February 2011

The 2011 Yemeni revolution followed other Arab Spring mass protests in early 2011. The uprising was initially against unemployment, economic conditions, and corruption, as well as against the government's proposals to modify the constitution of Yemen so that Saleh's son could inherit the presidency.

In March 2011, police snipers opened fire on the pro-democracy camp in Sanaa, killing more than 50 people. In May, dozens were killed in clashes between troops and tribal fighters in Sanaa. By this point, Saleh began to lose international support. In October 2011, Yemeni human rights activist Tawakul Karman won the Nobel Peace Prize and the UN Security Council condemned the violence and called for a transfer of power. On 23 November 2011, Saleh flew to Riyadh, in neighbouring Saudi Arabia, to sign the Gulf Co-operation Council plan for political transition, which he had previously spurned. Upon signing the document, he agreed to legally transfer the office and powers of the presidency to his deputy, Vice President Abd Rabbuh Mansur Hadi.

Hadi took office for a two-year term upon winning the uncontested presidential elections in February 2012, in which he was the only candidate standing. A unity government – including a prime minister from the opposition – was formed. Al-Hadi would oversee the drafting of a new constitution, followed by parliamentary and presidential elections in 2014.

==== 2012 ====
Saleh returned in February 2012. In the face of objections from thousands of street protesters, parliament granted him full immunity from prosecution. Saleh's son, General Ahmed Ali Abdullah Saleh continues to exercise a strong hold on sections of the military and security forces.

AQAP claimed responsibility for the February 2012 suicide attack on the presidential palace which killed 26 Republican Guards on the day that President Hadi was sworn in. AQAP was also behind the suicide bombing which killed 96 soldiers in Sanaa three months later. In September 2012, a car bomb attack in Sanaa killed 11 people, a day after a local al-Qaeda leader Said al-Shihri was reported killed in the south.

By 2012, there has been a "small contingent of U.S. special-operations troops" – in addition to CIA and "unofficially acknowledged" U.S. military presence – in response to increasing terror attacks by AQAP on Yemeni citizens. Many analysts have pointed out the former Yemeni government role in cultivating terrorist activity in the country. Following the election of new president Abd Rabbuh Mansur Hadi, the Yemeni military was able to push Ansar al-Sharia back and recapture the Shabwah Governorate.

==== Houthi takeover, Civil War and Saudi intervention ====
Current (January 2025) political and military control in ongoing Yemeni Civil War (2014–present) Controlled by the Government of Yemen (under the Presidential Leadership Council since April 2022) and allies Controlled by Houthis-led Supreme Political Council Controlled by Ansar al-Sharia, Al-Qaeda in the Arabian Peninsula and Islamic State of Iraq and the Levant

In 2014, the Houthi movement, which had been waging an insurgency against the Yemeni government since 2004, began a gradual takeover of Yemen, defeating government forces in the Battle of Amran and the Battle of Sanaa (2014). Their advance continued throughout Yemen, prompting the start of the Saudi Arabian-led intervention in Yemen. The Houthis attacked Aden on 25 March 2015, beginning the Battle of Aden (2015). Despite Saudi airstrikes, the Houthis managed to take advance into the Tawahi, Khormaksar, and Crater districts. The tide turned on 14 July, when an anti-Houthi counteroffensive managed to trap the Houthis on the peninsula. By 6 August 2015, the Hadi government had captured 75% of Taiz, and the Lahij insurgency had expelled Houthis from the Lahij Governorate. Hadi fortunes dissipated on 16 August, when Houthi forces successfully counterattacked and forced the Hadi forces to retreat from Al-Salih Gardens and the Al-Dabab Mountain region. Hadi forces attributed this reverse to a lack of military equipment. In Hadramaut, Al-Qaeda in the Arabian Peninsula (AQAP) managed to take over Mukalla after winning the Battle of Mukalla (2015), and in December 2015 they took over Zinjibar and Jaar.

2016 saw the Hadi government defeat Houthi forces in the Battle of Port Midi, and retake Mukalla from AQAP in the Battle of Mukalla (2016). In January 2017, the United States carried out the Raid on Yakla, in a failed attempt to obtain new intelligence regarding AQAP. In December, the Hadi Government began the Al Hudaydah offensive. In June 2018, the Hadi Government began an attack on the city of Hudaydah itself, starting the Battle of Al Hudaydah, which is considered the largest battle in the war since the start of the Saudi intervention.

In December 2017, former president and strongman Ali Abdullah Saleh was killed. He had been an ally of the Houthis since 2014 until just before his death.

The war in Yemen also resulted in cholera and famine. (See Famine in Yemen (2016–present) and 2016–18 Yemen cholera outbreak)

After losing the support of the Saudi-led coalition, Yemen's President Abd Rabbuh Mansur Hadi resigned and Presidential Leadership Council took power in April 2022.

== See also ==
- History of Asia
- History of the Middle East
- List of rulers of Saba and Himyar
- Imams of Yemen
- List of presidents of Yemen
- Politics of Yemen
- South Arabia
- South Yemen
- Timeline of Yemeni history
