= Al-Mutahhar =

Imam of the Zaydi state of Yemen (1547–1572)

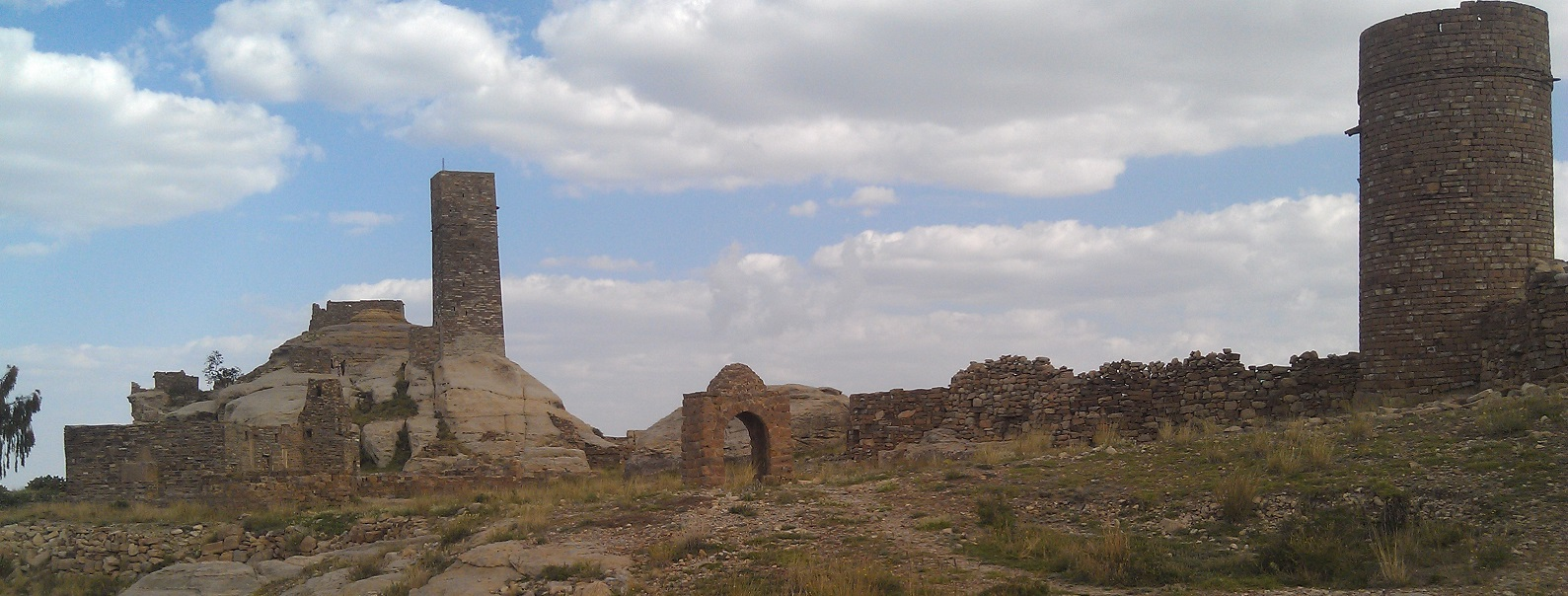
Ruins of Thula fortress in 'Amran, where al-Mutahhar barricaded himself against Ottoman attacks.

Al-Mutahhar bin Yahya Sharaf ad-Din (3 January 1503 – 9 November 1572) was a Zaydi imam of Yemen who ruled from 1547 to 1572. His era marked the temporary end of an autonomous Yemeni polity in the highlands. After the period of resistance against the Ottomans by al-Mutahhar and his eventual death, the following period marked the beginning of a long period of Ottoman domination which was only broken by the Qasimid imams of the Yemeni Zaydi State in the early 17th century.

== The coming of the Ottomans ==
Al-Mutahhar was a son of the imam al-Mutawakkil Yahya Sharaf ad-Din, who ruled large parts of Yemen in the 1530s and 1540s. Since his early years he showed good warrior skills, and assisted his father in gathering authority over the most of Yemen. The Ottoman Turks were placed in part of lower Yemen since 1539, but their power remained limited in scope. As it turned out, al-Mutawakkil preferred another son as presumptive heir to his powers. Al-Mutahhar, frustrated, encouraged the Turks to expand from their base in the Tihamah. The Zaydis lost Taiz to the Ottoman forces in 1547, and their elite resolved to make al-Mutahhar their leader instead of the elderly al-Mutawakkil Yahya Sharaf ad-Din. Nevertheless, the Turks expanded steadily. Sanaa, which had been the Zaydi capital since 1517, fell on 23 August 1547.

== Submission and further resistance ==
Al-Mutahhar took up a stance in the strong mountain stronghold Thula. He was not a man of doctrinal learning (mujtahid), and was furthermore lame; he therefore lacked some of the formal qualifications for a bona fide imam, as laid down by Zaydi tradition, and was only imam in the sense of military leader. In 1552 he made peace with the Turks, who officially made him sancakbey, with authority over the districts north-west of Sana'a. In 1566, Turkish misbehaviour gave rise to dissatisfaction among parts of the Yemeni population that had hitherto been positive to the Ottoman presence. Al-Mutahhar headed the rebellion with considerable success. By 1568, the Turks were reduced to a minor coastal enclave.

Then, however, the Ottoman sultan Selim II sent the redoubtable commander Sinan Pasha to Yemen with reinforcements. Al-Mutahhar was pushed back in 1569–70, but could not be entirely overcome. Sinan Pasha eventually made a truce with al-Mutahhar at Kawkaban. The imam died in relative obscurity in 1572, of blood in the urine. There was no unity among his sons, who controlled various districts. His nephew Ali bin Shams ad-Din acknowledged the authority of the Ottomans against being allowed to keep Kawkaban as a fief. Ali's descendants adhered to the Porte until 1626, and were able to rule as amirs in Kawkaban until 1872. The defeat and death of al-Mutahhar marked the beginning of a long period of Ottoman domination which was only broken by the Qasimid imams in the early 17th century. Al-Mutahhar also persecuted the Taiyabi Ismaili Shia sect, leading to the seat of leadership to shift from Yemen to Gujarat, India. See Yusuf Najmuddin ibn Sulaiman for further information.

== See also ==
- Rassids
- History of Yemen

Preceded by al-Mutawakkil Yahya Sharaf ad-Din	Zaydi Imam of Yemen; 1547–1572	Vacant Ottoman rule Title next held by an-Nasir al-Hasan bin Ali
