= An-Nasir al-Hasan bin Ali =

An-Nasir al-Hasan bin Ali (died 1615) was a claimant to the Zaidi state of Yemen between 1579 and 1585, in opposition to the Ottoman Turks, who occupied the Yemeni lands for years.

== Anti-Ottoman risings ==
Al-Hasan bin Ali bin Da'ud was a great-nephew of the imam al-Hadi Izz ad-Din (d. 1495) who had revived the fortunes of the Zaidi state in the late 15th century. The troops of the Ottoman sultan Selim II, led by Sinan Pasha crushed Yemeni resistance in 1570. However, discontent with the occupiers continued, especially in the highlands where people belonged to the Zaydiyyah in opposition to the Sunni lowlands. In 1579 al-Hasan proclaimed the imamate in the Ahnum region under the name an-Nasir al-Hasan, vowing to fight the Turks. His rising was paralleled by a messianic movement, led by a certain Mansur Himyar in the Anis region, which proclaimed the end of the Ottoman Empire.

== Defeated by Hasan Pasha ==
However, the power basis of an-Nasir al-Hasan was quite limited. He was actually attacked by other Zaidi groups, such as the Hamzah sharifs, the sons of the last imam al-Mutahhar, and even by his cousins of the Mu'ayyad clan. In 1580, a new and redoubtable Ottoman governor, Hasan Pasha, was appointed by the Porte. By making use of the inner divisions of the highland groups, Hasan Pasha was able to reinforce the sultan's authority in the regions north of San'a. Sa'dah and Najran were occupied by the Turks in 1583. An-Nasir al-Hasan kept his stronghold in the inaccessible Shaharah but was eventually betrayed and captured on 11 September 1585. His captor was the ketkhuda (deputy) of Hasan Pasha, Emir Sinan. After having spent one year in prison in San'a, he was brought to Turkey where he eventually died in 1615. The torch of resistance was taken over in 1597 by the imam al-Mansur al-Qasim, of another Sayyid lineage, who founded a new Yemeni state.

== See also ==
- Imams of Yemen
- Rassids

Vacant Ottoman rule Title last held by al-Mutahhar	Zaydi Imam of Yemen; 1579–1585	Vacant Ottoman rule Title next held by al-Mansur al-Qasim
