= Al-Mutawakkil Yahya Sharaf ad-Din =

Imam of the Zaydi state in Yemen

Al-Mutawakkil Yahya Sharaf ad-Din (25 February 1473 – 27 March 1555) was a Zaydi imam of Yemen. His period as imam covered the period from 1506 to 1555, though his political power ended in about 1547.

== Construction of a new Zaydi realm ==
Yahya Sharaf ad-Din bin Shams ad-Din bin Ahmad was a grandson of the Imam al-Mahdi Ahmad bin Yahya (d. 1436) and was born in north-western Yemen. He spent several years in study to become a mujtahid (a man of Zaydi religious learning) and then proclaimed his da'wa (call for the imamate) in September 1506. At this time there was another imam in the Yemeni highlands, an-Nasir al-Hasan, who was, however, more a man of letters than a politician. The Tahiride Dynasty ruled the lowlands and southern highlands from Taiz, and had recently sacked the Zaydi capital Sanaa. However, the Tahirids were defeated by the Mamluks from Egypt in 1517 and the Sultan Amir was killed. Shortly afterwards, the Mamluk sultanate in Egypt was in turn defeated by the Ottoman Sultan Selim I. The Mamluk troops in Yemen, as a consequence, had to acknowledge the overlordship of Selim. The weak garrison in Sanaa had to withdraw, and the important city was taken over by al-Mutawakkil Yahya Sharaf ad-Din. The imam proceeded to expand the territory of the Zaydi imamate at the expense of various Tahiride princes who still ruled over scattered domains. Taiz was taken in 1534, followed by Khanfar, Lahij and Abyan. The Imam persecuted the Taiyabi Ismaili community in Yemen. See Mohammad Ezzuddin for further information.

== Ottoman intervention ==
After three decades of struggles, al-Mutawakkil Yahya Sharaf ad-Din was able to impose his authority over most of the Zaydi communities in Yemen, together with several Sunni areas. The imam was assisted by his sons, in particular al-Mutahhar. He thus resurrected the Zaydi imamate after a long period of disunity and much of the southern highlands and northern Tihamah was brought under his control. However, the Ottoman Turks had a vital interest in securing Yemen, which was described as being "more flourishing than the province of Egypt". At this time the Portuguese seafarers had become a nuisance in the Indian Ocean region, threatening to cut off trade between the Red Sea and the Indian coast. There were therefore good strategical reasons to control south-western Arabia. An Ottoman expedition established a small enclave in Zabid in 1539, but their little enclave was contained by the imam's forces for eight years. However, dissension within the imam's immediate family played into the Turks' hands. His ablest son, al-Mutahhar, even urged the Ottoman commander in Zabid to attack the lands of the imam.

== Withdrawing from rulership ==
In 1547, when a new Turkish military onslaught began, al-Mutawakkil Yahya Sharaf ad-Din had to ask his son al-Mutahhar for support. From that date, Al-Mutahhar took over from his ageing father and struck coins in his own name. The Turkish advance could not be stopped, however. Özdemir Pasha took Sanaa through treachery in the same year and 1,200 inhabitants were massacred whom were mostly sadah or lords people who claimed they are Hashemites. Al-Mutahhar continued the anti-Ottoman struggle in the highlands. As for al-Mutwakkil Yahya Sharaf ad-Din, although deprived of power, he retained much influence within the Zaydi community. His attitude to the encroaching Turks was ambivalent. The old imam died in 1555 in Zafir. (Note: Other sources say that the imam died in 1557/58.)

== See also ==
- Rassids

== Notes ==
Preceded by an-Nasir al-Hasan	Zaydi Imam of Yemen; 1506–1555	Succeeded by al-Mutahhar
