= Bani Wayel =

Bani Wayel بني وائل
- Sub-district
- Location in Yemen
- Coordinates: 14°02′55″N 43°59′06″E
- Country: Yemen
- Governorate: Ibb Governorate
- District: Hazm al-'Udayn District

Population (2004)
  - Total: 4,780
- Time zone: UTC+3

Bani Wayel (Arabic: بني وائل) is a sub-district located in Hazm al-'Udayn District, Ibb Governorate, Yemen. Bani Wayel had a population of 4780 according to the 2004 census.
