= Aynan =

Aynan عينان
- Sub-district
- Location in Yemen
- Coordinates: 13°51′20″N 44°17′28″E
- Country: Yemen
- Governorate: Ibb Governorate
- District: As Sabrah District

Population (2004)
  - Total: 6,364
- Time zone: UTC+3

Aynan (Arabic: عينان) is a sub-district located in al-Sabrah District, Ibb Governorate, Yemen. Aynan had a population of 6830 according to the 2004 census.
