= Al-Dharhi =

Al-Dharhi الذارحي
- Sub-district
- Location in Yemen
- Coordinates: 14°04′57″N 44°04′19″E
- Country: Yemen
- Governorate: Ibb Governorate
- District: Hubaysh District

Population (2004)
  - Total: 1,540
- Time zone: UTC+3

Al-Dharhi (Arabic: الذارحي) is a sub-district located in Hubaysh District, Ibb Governorate, Yemen. Al-Dharhi had a population of 1540 according to the 2004 census.
