= Al-Hawj al-Adani =

Al-Hawj al-Adani الحوج العدنى
- Sub-district
- Location in Yemen
- Coordinates: 13°55′36″N 44°13′34″E
- Country: Yemen
- Governorate: Ibb Governorate
- District: Al Mashannah District

Population (2004)
  - Total: 6,116

Al-Hawj al-Adani (Arabic: الحوج العدنى) is a sub-district located in Al Mashannah District, Ibb Governorate, Yemen. Al-Hawj al-Adani had a population of 6116 as of 2004.
