= Sha'ab Yafa'a =

Sha'ab Yafa'a شعب يافع
- Sub-district
- Location in Yemen
- Coordinates: 14°01′24″N 44°08′39″E
- Country: Yemen
- Governorate: Ibb Governorate
- District: Ibb District

Population (2004)
  - Total: 18,383
- Time zone: UTC+3

Sha'ab Yafa'a (Arabic: شعب يافع) is a sub-district located in Ibb District, Ibb Governorate, Yemen. Sha'ab Yafa'a had a population of 18383 as of 2004.
