= Jabal Al-Jabali =

Jabal Al-Jabali جبل الجبالي
- Sub-district
- Location in Yemen
- Coordinates: 14°09′06″N 44°27′32″E
- Country: Yemen
- Governorate: Ibb Governorate
- District: As Saddah District

Population (2004)
  - Total: 1,631
- Time zone: UTC+3

Jabal Al-Jabali (Arabic: جبل الجبالي) is a sub-district located in al-Saddah District, Ibb Governorate, Yemen. Jabal Al-Jabali had a population of 1,631 according to the 2004 census.
