= Al-Zamilyah =

Al-Zamilyah الزاملية
- Sub-district
- Location in Yemen
- Coordinates: 13°53′33″N 43°57′17″E
- Country: Yemen
- Governorate: Ibb Governorate
- District: Mudhaykhirah District

Population (2004)
  - Total: 1,372
- Time zone: UTC+3

Al-Zamilyah (Arabic: الزاملية) is a sub-district located in Mudhaykhirah District, Ibb Governorate, Yemen. Al-Zamilyah had a population of 1,372 according to the 2004 census.
