= Khawdan =

Khawdan خودان
- Sub-district
- Location in Yemen
- Coordinates: 14.3253°N 44.1936°E
- Country: Yemen
- Governorate: Ibb Governorate
- District: Yarim District

Population (2004)
  - Total: 12,753
- Time zone: UTC+3

Khawdan (Arabic: خودان) is a sub-district located in Yarim District, Ibb Governorate, Yemen. Khawdan had a population of 12,753 as of 2004.
