= Jabal Amiqah =

Jabal Amiqah جبل عميقة
- Sub-district
- Location in Yemen
- Country: Yemen
- Governorate: Ibb Governorate
- District: Hubaysh District

Population (2004)
  - Total: 7,069
- Time zone: UTC+3

Jabal Amiqah (Arabic: جبل عميقة) is a sub-district located in Hubaysh District, Ibb Governorate, Yemen. Jabal Amiqah had a population of 7069 according to the 2004 census.
