= Al-Miftah =

Al-Miftah المفتاح
- Sub-district
- Location in Yemen
- Coordinates: 14°02′42″N 44°25′14″E
- Country: Yemen
- Governorate: Ibb Governorate
- District: Ash Sha'ar District

Population (2004)
  - Total: 1,387
- Time zone: UTC+3

Al-Miftah (Arabic: المفتاح) is a sub-district located in al-Sha'ar District, Ibb Governorate, Yemen. Al-Miftah had a population of 1387 as of 2004.
