= Al-Twayti =

Al-Twayti التويتي
- Sub-district
- Location in Yemen
- Coordinates: 14°06′07″N 44°22′39″E
- Country: Yemen
- Governorate: Ibb Governorate
- District: As Saddah District

Population (2004)
  - Total: 10,873
- Time zone: UTC+3

Al-Twayti (Arabic: التويتي) is a sub-district located in al-Saddah District, Ibb Governorate, Yemen. Al-Twayti had a population of 10873 according to the 2004 census.
