= Bani Amr al-Alli =

Bani Amr al-Alli بني عمر العالي
- Sub-district
- Location in Yemen
- Coordinates: 14°21′24″N 44°09′17″E
- Country: Yemen
- Governorate: Ibb Governorate
- District: Al Qafr District

Population (2004)
  - Total: 3,724

Bani Amr al-Alli (Arabic: بني عمر العالي) is a sub-district located in Al Qafr District, Ibb Governorate, Yemen. Bani Amr al-Alli had a population of 3724 as of 2004.
