= Al-Ahkum =

Al-Ahkum الأحكوم
- Sub-district
- Location in Yemen
- Coordinates: 14°10′57″N 43°54′27″E
- Country: Yemen
- Governorate: Ibb Governorate
- District: Hazm al-'Udayn District

Population (2004)
  - Total: 3,122
- Time zone: UTC+3

Al-Ahkum (Arabic: الأحكوم) is a sub-district located in Hazm al-'Udayn District, Ibb Governorate, Yemen. Al-Ahkum had a population of 3122 according to the 2004 census.
