= Al-Arafah =

Al-Arafah العرافة
- Sub-district
- Location in Yemen
- Coordinates: 14°12′00″N 44°25′10″E
- Country: Yemen
- Governorate: Ibb Governorate
- District: As Saddah District

Population (2004)
  - Total: 7,023
- Time zone: UTC+3

Al-Arafah (Arabic: العرافة) is a sub-district located in al-Saddah District, Ibb Governorate, Yemen. Al-Arafah had a population of 7,023 according to the 2004 census.
