= Al-Mazariqa =

Al-Mazariqa المزارقة
- Sub-district
- Location in Yemen
- Coordinates: 14°08′12″N 43°56′48″E
- Country: Yemen
- Governorate: Ibb Governorate
- District: Hazm al-'Udayn District

Population (2004)
  - Total: 1,133
- Time zone: UTC+3

Al-Mazariqa (Arabic: المزارقة) is a sub-district located in Hazm al-'Udayn District, Ibb Governorate, Yemen. Al-Mazariqa had a population of 1133 according to the 2004 census.
