= Al-Tafadi =

Al-Tafadi التفادي
- Sub-district
- Location in Yemen
- Coordinates: 14°03′55″N 44°03′17″E
- Country: Yemen
- Governorate: Ibb Governorate
- District: Hubaysh District

Population (2004)
  - Total: 3,910
- Time zone: UTC+3

Al-Tafadi (Arabic: التفادي) is a sub-district located in Hubaysh District, Ibb Governorate, Yemen. Al-Tafadi had a population of 3910 according to the 2004 census.
