= Al-Mashana =

Al-Mashana المشنة
- Sub-district
- Country: Yemen
- Governorate: Ibb Governorate
- District: Al Mashannah District

Population (2004)
  - Total: 86,212

Al-Mashana (Arabic: المشنة) is a sub-district located in Al Mashannah District, Ibb Governorate, Yemen. Al-Mashana had a population of 86,212 as of 2004.
