= Al-Ashraf (Ibb) =

Al-Ashraf الاشراف
- Sub-district
- Location in Yemen
- Coordinates: 13°49′58″N 44°04′01″E
- Country: Yemen
- Governorate: Ibb Governorate
- District: Dhi As Sufal District

Population (2004)
  - Total: 1,652
- Time zone: UTC+3

Al-Ashraf (Arabic: الاشراف) is a sub-district located in Dhi al-Sufal District, Ibb Governorate, Yemen. Al-Ashraf had a population of 1,652 as of 2004.
