= Al-Ja'afirah =

Al-Ja'afirah الجعافرة
- Sub-district
- Location in Yemen
- Coordinates: 14°05′23″N 44°00′57″E
- Country: Yemen
- Governorate: Ibb Governorate
- District: Hubaysh District

Population (2004)
  - Total: 3,003
- Time zone: UTC+3

Al-Ja'afirah (Arabic: الجعافرة) is a sub-district located in Hubaysh District, Ibb Governorate, Yemen. Al-Ja'afirah had a population of 3003 according to the 2004 census.
