= Aryab =

Aryab ارياب
- Sub-district
- Location in Yemen
- Coordinates: 14°09′52″N 44°17′59″E
- Country: Yemen
- Governorate: Ibb Governorate
- District: Yarim District

Population (2004)
  - Total: 27,377
- Time zone: UTC+3

Aryab (Arabic: ارياب) is a sub-district located in Yarim District, Ibb Governorate, Yemen. Aryab had a population of 27377 as of 2004.
