= Aras (Ibb) =

Aras عراس
- Sub-district
- Location in Yemen
- Coordinates: 14°15′15″N 44°23′08″E
- Country: Yemen
- Governorate: Ibb Governorate
- District: Yarim District

Population (2004)
  - Total: 7,755
- Time zone: UTC+3

Aras (Arabic: عراس) is a sub-district located in Yarim District, Ibb Governorate, Yemen. Aras had a population of 7755 as of 2004.
