= Al-Zirah =

Al-Zirah الزره
- village
- Location in Yemen
- Coordinates: 13°54′40.9″N 43°52′12.0″E
- Country: Yemen
- Governorate: Ibb Governorate
- District: Al Udayn District

Population (2004)
  - Total: 816
- Time zone: UTC+3
- Geocode: 7356150

Al-Zirah (Arabic: الزره) is one of the villages of Uzlah Urdan, in Al Udayn District, which belongs to Ibb Governorate in Yemen. Its population was 816 according to the 2004 Yemen Census.
