= Khanwah =

Khanwah خنوة
- Sub-district
- Location in Yemen
- Country: Yemen
- Governorate: Ibb Governorate
- District: Dhi As Sufal District

Population (2004)
  - Total: 51,027
- Time zone: UTC+3

Khanwah (Arabic: خنوة) is a sub-district located in Dhi al-Sufal District, Ibb Governorate, Yemen. Khanwah had a population of 51027 as of 2004.
