= Amid al-Dakhil =

Amid al-Dakhil عميد الداخل
- Sub-district
- Location in Yemen
- Coordinates: 13°47′40″N 44°11′37″E
- Country: Yemen
- Governorate: Ibb Governorate
- District: As Sayyani District

Population (2004)
  - Total: 4,650
- Time zone: UTC+3

Amid al-Dakhil (Arabic: عميد الداخل) is a sub-district located in al-Sayyani District, Ibb Governorate, Yemen. Amid al-Dakhil had a population of 4650 according to the 2004 census.
