= Ra'yn =

Ra'yn رعين
- Sub-district
- Location in Yemen
- Coordinates: 14°18′41″N 44°25′11″E
- Country: Yemen
- Governorate: Ibb Governorate
- District: Yarim District

Population (2004)
  - Total: 18,242
- Time zone: UTC+3

Ra'yn (Arabic: رعين) is a sub-district located in Yarim District, Ibb Governorate, Yemen. Ra'yn had a population of 18,242 as of 2004.
