= Sa'yr =

Sa'yr صائر
- Sub-district
- Location in Yemen
- Coordinates: 14°3′5″N 44°6′11″E
- Country: Yemen
- Governorate: Ibb Governorate
- District: Hubaysh District
- Elevation: 2,134 m (7,001 ft)

Population (2004)
  - Total: 3,249
- Time zone: UTC+3

Sa'yr (Arabic: صائر) is a sub-district located in Hubaysh District, Ibb Governorate, Yemen. Sa'yr had a population of 3,249 according to the 2004 census.
