= Bani Al-Harth =

Bani Al-Harth بني الحارث
- Sub-district
- Location in Yemen
- Coordinates: 14°07′12″N 44°17′15″E
- Country: Yemen
- Governorate: Ibb Governorate
- District: As Saddah District

Population (2004)
  - Total: 9,010
- Time zone: UTC+3

Bani Al-Harth (Arabic: بني الحارث) is a sub-district located in al-Saddah District, Ibb Governorate, Yemen. Bani Al-Harth had a population of 9010 according to the 2004 census.
