= Al-Masil =

Al-Masil المسيل
- Sub-district
- Location in Yemen
- Coordinates: 14°00′31″N 43°45′01″E
- Country: Yemen
- Governorate: Ibb Governorate
- District: Far Al Udayn District

Population (2004)
  - Total: 7,748
- Time zone: UTC+3

Al-Masil (Arabic: المسيل) is a sub-district located in Far Al Udayn District, Ibb Governorate, Yemen. Al-Masil had a population of 7748 according to the 2004 census.
