= Bani Al-Fakher =

Bani Al-Fakher بني الفخر
- Sub-district
- Location in Yemen
- Coordinates: 14°04′15″N 43°58′51″E
- Country: Yemen
- Governorate: Ibb Governorate
- District: Hazm al-'Udayn District

Population (2004)
  - Total: 2,721
- Time zone: UTC+3

Bani Al-Fakher (Arabic: بني الفخر) is a sub-district located in Hazm al-'Udayn District, Ibb Governorate, Yemen. Bani Al-Fakher had a population of 2721 according to the 2004 census.
