= Dhi Al-Hawd and Ma'yin =

Dhi Al-Hawd and Ma'yin ذي الحود ومعاين
- Sub-district
- Location in Yemen
- Country: Yemen
- Governorate: Ibb Governorate
- District: Dhi As Sufal District

Population (2004)
  - Total: 4,974
- Time zone: UTC+3

Dhi Al-Hawd and Ma'yin (Arabic: ذي الحود ومعاين) is a sub-district located in Dhi al-Sufal District, Ibb Governorate, Yemen. Dhi Al-Hawd and Ma'yin had a population of 4974 as of 2004.
