= Al-Asloum =

Al-Asloum الأسلوم
- Sub-district
- Location in Yemen
- Coordinates: 14°02′50″N 43°55′20″E
- Country: Yemen
- Governorate: Ibb Governorate
- District: Hazm al-'Udayn District

Population (2004)
  - Total: 3,031
- Time zone: UTC+3

Al-Asloum (Arabic: الأسلوم) is a sub-district located in Hazm al-'Udayn District, Ibb Governorate, Yemen. Al-Asloum had a population of 3031 according to the 2004 census.
