= Khawlan (sub-district) =

Khawlan خولان
- Sub-district
- Location in Yemen
- Coordinates: 13°49′31″N 43°59′39″E
- Country: Yemen
- Governorate: Ibb Governorate
- District: Mudhaykhirah District

Population (2004)
  - Total: 6,606
- Time zone: UTC+3

Khawlan (Arabic: خولان) is a sub-district located in Mudhaykhirah District, Ibb Governorate, Yemen. Khawlan had a population of 6,606 according to the 2004 census.
