= Dhalm =

Dhalm ظلم
- Sub-district
- Location in Yemen
- Coordinates: 14°04′45″N 44°32′30″E
- Country: Yemen
- Governorate: Ibb Governorate
- District: An Nadirah District

Population (2004)
  - Total: 2,837
- Time zone: UTC+3
- Geocode: 8735323

Dhalm (Arabic: ظلم) is a sub-district located in al-Nadirah District, Ibb Governorate, Yemen. Dhalm had a population of 2837 according to the 2004 census.
