= Al-Hasaabin =

Al-Hasaabin الحصابين
- Village
- Location in Yemen
- Coordinates: 13°55′0.0″N 43°53′45.0″E
- Country: Yemen
- Governorate: Ibb Governorate
- District: Al Udayn District

Population (2004)
  - Total: 2,159
- Time zone: UTC+3
- Geocode: 30758

Al-hasaabin (Arabic: الحصابين) is a village in Uzlah Urdan, in Al Udayn District. It is part of the Ibb Governorate in Yemen. Its population was 2,159 according to the 2004 Yemen census.
