= Madhajain =

Madhajain مدحجين
- Sub-district
- Location in Yemen
- Coordinates: 14°20′21″N 43°56′42″E
- Country: Yemen
- Governorate: Ibb Governorate
- District: Al Qafr District

Population (2004)
  - Total: 2,846
- Time zone: UTC+3

Madhajain (Arabic: مدحجين) is a sub-district located in Al Qafr District, Ibb Governorate, Yemen. Bani Saif al-Alli had a population of 2846 as of 2004.
