= Bani Al-Othmanyan =

Bani Al-Othmanyan بني العثمانيين
- Sub-district
- Location in Yemen
- Coordinates: 14°06′16″N 44°19′47″E
- Country: Yemen
- Governorate: Ibb Governorate
- District: As Saddah District

Population (2004)
  - Total: 3,893
- Time zone: UTC+3

Bani Al-Othmanyan (Arabic: بني العثمانيين) is a sub-district located in al-Saddah District, Ibb Governorate, Yemen. Bani Al-Othmanyan had a population of 3893 according to the 2004 census.
