= Hazib =

Hazib حزيب
- Sub-district
- Location in Yemen
- Coordinates: 14°07′07″N 44°28′05″E
- Country: Yemen
- Governorate: Ibb Governorate
- District: An Nadirah District

Population (2004)
  - Total: 10,471
- Time zone: UTC+3
- Geocode: 8735316

Hazib (Arabic: حزيب) is a sub-district located in al-Nadirah District, Ibb Governorate, Yemen. Hazib had a population of 10471 according to the 2004 census.
