= Al-Haith =

Al-Haith الحيث
- Sub-district
- Location in Yemen
- Coordinates: 14°01′22″N 44°13′15″E
- Country: Yemen
- Governorate: Ibb Governorate
- District: Ba'dan District

Population (2004)
  - Total: 6,699
- Time zone: UTC+3

Al-Haith (Arabic: الحيث) is a sub-district located in Ba'dan District, Ibb Governorate, Yemen. Al-Haith had a population of 6699 as of 2004.
