= Al-Ma'shar =

Al-Ma'shar المعشار
- Sub-district
- Location in Yemen
- Coordinates: 14°09′32″N 44°11′37″E
- Country: Yemen
- Governorate: Ibb Governorate
- District: Al Makhadir District

Population (2004)
  - Total: 5,453
- Time zone: UTC+3
- Geocode: 8735262

Al-Ma'shar (Arabic: المعشار) is a sub-district located in Al Makhadir District, Ibb Governorate, Yemen. Al-Ma'shar had a population of 5453 as of 2004.
