= Al-Nakhla =

Al-Nakhla النخلة
- Sub-district
- Location in Yemen
- Coordinates: 14°23′38″N 44°02′42″E
- Country: Yemen
- Governorate: Ibb Governorate
- District: Al Qafr District

Population (2004)
  - Total: 2,177

Al-Nakhla (Arabic: النخلة) is a sub-district located in Al Qafr District, Ibb Governorate, Yemen. Al-Nakhla had a population of 2177 as of 2004.
