= Wadi Dhaba =

Wadi Dhaba وادي ضباء
- Sub-district
- Location in Yemen
- Country: Yemen
- Governorate: Ibb Governorate
- District: Dhi As Sufal District

Population (2004)
  - Total: 26,028
- Time zone: UTC+3

Wadi Dhaba (Arabic: وادي ضباء) is a sub-district located in Dhi al-Sufal District, Ibb Governorate, Yemen. Wadi Dhaba had a population of 26028 as of 2004.
