= Azal (Ibb) =

Azal أزال
- Sub-district
- Location in Yemen
- Coordinates: 14°11′42″N 44°35′05″E
- Country: Yemen
- Governorate: Ibb Governorate
- District: Ar Radmah District

Population (2004)
  - Total: 7,974
- Time zone: UTC+3

Azal (Arabic: أزال) is a sub-district located in al-Radmah District, Ibb Governorate, Yemen. Azal had a population of 7974 according to the 2004 census.
