= Al-Sadr (Ibb) =

Al-Sadr الصدر
- Sub-district
- Location in Yemen
- Coordinates: 14°6′56″N 44°7′3″E
- Country: Yemen
- Governorate: Ibb Governorate
- District: Hubaysh District

Population (2004)
  - Total: 2,730
- Time zone: UTC+3

Al-Sadr (Arabic: الصدر) is a sub-district located in Hubaysh District, Ibb Governorate, Yemen. Al-Sadr had a population of 2730 according to the 2004 census.
