= Thawab al-Asfal =

Thawab al-Asfal ثواب الاسفل
- Sub-district
- Location in Yemen
- Coordinates: 13°59′13″N 44°09′14″E
- Country: Yemen
- Governorate: Ibb Governorate
- District: Al Dhihar district

Population (2004)
  - Total: 11,187
- Time zone: UTC+3

Thawab al-Asfal (Arabic: ثواب الاسفل) is a sub-district located in Al Dhihar district, Ibb Governorate, Yemen. Thawab al-Asfal had a population of 11187 as of 2004.
