= Al-Muharram =

Al-Muharram المحرم
- Sub-district
- Location in Yemen
- Coordinates: 14°12′00″N 44°13′37″E
- Country: Yemen
- Governorate: Ibb Governorate
- District: Al Makhadir District

Population (2004)
  - Total: 2,434
- Time zone: UTC+3
- Geocode: 8735261

Al-Muharram (Arabic: المحرم) is a sub-district located in Al Makhadir District, Ibb Governorate, Yemen. Al-Muharram had a population of 2434 as of 2004.
