= Al-Da'ais =

Al-Da'ais الدعيس
- Sub-district
- Location in Yemen
- Coordinates: 13°59′09″N 44°17′18″E
- Country: Yemen
- Governorate: Ibb Governorate
- District: Ba'dan District

Population (2004)
  - Total: 9,790
- Time zone: UTC+3

Al-Da'ais (Arabic: الدعيس) is a sub-district located in Ba'dan District, Ibb Governorate, Yemen. Al-Da'ais has a population of 9790 as of 2004.
