= Al-Maabar =

Al-Maabar المعبر
- village
- Location in Yemen
- Coordinates: 13°55′29.9″N 43°52′28.1″E
- Country: Yemen
- Governorate: Ibb Governorate
- District: Al Udayn District

Population (2004)
  - Total: 2,388
- Time zone: UTC+3
- Geocode: 11917704

Al-Maabar (Arabic: المعبر) is one of the villages of Uzlah Urdan, in Al Udayn District, which belongs to Ibb Governorate in Yemen. Its population was 2,388 according to the 2004 Yemen Census.
