= Bani Ma'ain =

Bani Ma'ain بني معين
- Sub-district
- Location in Yemen
- Coordinates: 14°04′07″N 44°05′21″E
- Country: Yemen
- Governorate: Ibb Governorate
- District: Hubaysh District

Population (2004)
  - Total: 5,591
- Time zone: UTC+3

Bani Ma'ain (Arabic: بني معين) is a sub-district located in Hubaysh District, Ibb Governorate, Yemen. Bani Ma'ain had a population of 5591 according to the 2004 census.
