= Bani Saif as-Safl =

Bani Saif as-Safl بني سيف السافل
- Sub-district
- Location in Yemen
- Coordinates: 14°14′42″N 44°08′25″E
- Country: Yemen
- Governorate: Ibb Governorate
- District: Al Qafr District

Population (2004)
  - Total: 17,679

Bani Saif as-Safl (Arabic: بني سيف السافل) is a sub-district located in Al Qafr District, Ibb Governorate, Yemen. Bani Saif as-Safl had a population of 17679 according to the 2004 census.
