= Wadi Usam =

Wadi Usam وادي عصام
- Sub-district
- Location in Yemen
- Coordinates: 14°13′10″N 44°27′54″E
- Country: Yemen
- Governorate: Ibb Governorate
- District: As Saddah District

Population (2004)
  - Total: 5,630
- Time zone: UTC+3

Wadi Usam (Arabic: وادي عصام) is a sub-district located in al-Saddah District, Ibb Governorate, Yemen.Wadi Usam had a population of 5630 according to the 2004 census.
