= Wadi Hajaj =

Wadi Hajaj وادي حجاج
- Sub-district
- Location in Yemen
- Coordinates: 14°07′52″N 44°24′51″E
- Country: Yemen
- Governorate: Ibb Governorate
- District: As Saddah District

Population (2004)
  - Total: 11,430
- Time zone: UTC+3

Wadi Hajaj (Arabic: وادي حجاج) is a sub-district located in al-Saddah District, Ibb Governorate, Yemen. Wadi Hajaj had a population of 11,430 according to the 2004 census.
