= Rumada =

Rumada رماضه
- village
- Location in Yemen
- Coordinates: 13°54′34.7″N 43°53′15.5″E
- Country: Yemen
- Governorate: Ibb Governorate
- District: Al Udayn District

Population (2004)
  - Total: 2,199
- Time zone: UTC+3
- Geocode: 7356111

Rumada(Arabic: رماضه) is one of the villages of Uzlah Urdan, in Al Udayn District, which belongs to Ibb Governorate in Yemen. Its population was 2,199 according to the 2004 Yemen Census.
