= Al-Hawj al-Qabli =

Al-Hawj al-Qabli الحوج القبلي
- Sub-district
- Location in Yemen
- Coordinates: 14°01′02″N 44°11′17″E
- Country: Yemen
- Governorate: Ibb Governorate
- District: Ibb District

Population (2004)
  - Total: 4,889
- Time zone: UTC+3

Al-Hawj al-Qabli (Arabic: الحوج القبلي) is a sub-district located in Ibb District, Ibb Governorate, Yemen. Al-Hawj al-Qabli had a population of 4889 as of 2004.
