= Dalal (Ibb) =

Dalal دلال
- Sub-district
- Location in Yemen
- Coordinates: 13°59′17″N 44°20′11″E
- Country: Yemen
- Governorate: Ibb Governorate
- District: Ba'dan District

Population (2004)
  - Total: 14,776
- Time zone: UTC+3

Dalal (Arabic: دلال) is a sub-district located in Ba'dan District, Ibb Governorate, Yemen. Dalal had a population of 14776 as of 2004.
