= Al-Wata'h =

Al-Wata'h الوطئة
- Sub-district
- Location in Yemen
- Coordinates: 14°05′56″N 44°03′38″E
- Country: Yemen
- Governorate: Ibb Governorate
- District: Hubaysh District

Population (2004)
  - Total: 1,009
- Time zone: UTC+3

Al-Wata'h (Arabic: الوطئة) is a sub-district located in Hubaysh District, Ibb Governorate, Yemen. Al-Wata'h had a population of 1009 according to the 2004 census.
