= Jabal Aqd =

Jabal Aqd جبل عقد
- Sub-district
- Location in Yemen
- Coordinates: 14°07′58″N 44°11′58″E
- Country: Yemen
- Governorate: Ibb Governorate
- District: Al Makhadir District

Population (2004)
  - Total: 18,237
- Time zone: UTC+3

Jabal Aqd (Arabic: جبل عقد) is a sub-district located in Al Makhadir District, Ibb Governorate, Yemen. Jabal Aqd had a population of 18237 as of 2004.
