= Al-Adani =

Al-Adani اَلْعَدَانِي
- Sub-district
- Location in Yemen
- Coordinates: 13.8029°N 44.01371°E
- Country: Yemen
- Governorate: Ibb Governorate
- District: Dhi As Sufal District

Population (2004)
  - Total: 10,495
- Time zone: UTC+3

Al-Adani (Arabic: اَلْعَدَانِي) is a sub-district located in Dhi al-Sufal District, Ibb Governorate, Yemen. Al-Adani had a population of 10,495 as of 2004.
