= Jabal Hajaj =

Jabal Hajaj جبل حجاج
- Sub-district
- Location in Yemen
- Coordinates: 14°09′41″N 44°25′16″E
- Country: Yemen
- Governorate: Ibb Governorate
- District: As Saddah District

Population (2004)
  - Total: 3,894
- Time zone: UTC+3

Jabal Hajaj (Arabic: جبل حجاج) is a sub-district located in al-Saddah District, Ibb Governorate, Yemen. Jabal Hajaj had a population of 3894 according to the 2004 census.
