= Al-Magharibah =

Al-Magharibah المغاربة
- Sub-district
- Location in Yemen
- Coordinates: 13°49′52″N 43°58′11″E
- Country: Yemen
- Governorate: Ibb Governorate
- District: Mudhaykhirah District

Population (2004)
  - Total: 2,625
- Time zone: UTC+3

Al-Magharibah (Arabic: المغاربة) is a sub-district located in Mudhaykhirah District, Ibb Governorate, Yemen. Al-Magharibah had a population of 2,625 according to the 2004 census.
