= Al-Amas =

Al-Amas الأعماس
- Sub-district
- Location in Yemen
- Coordinates: 14°10′18″N 44°22′45″E
- Country: Yemen
- Governorate: Ibb Governorate
- District: As Saddah District

Population (2004)
  - Total: 9,811
- Time zone: UTC+3

Al-Amas (Arabic: الأعماس) is a sub-district located in al-Saddah District, Ibb Governorate, Yemen.Al-Amas had a population of 9811 according to the 2004 census.
