= Bani Sulaiman =

Bani Sulaiman بني سليمان
- Sub-district
- Location in Yemen
- Coordinates: 15.197°N 43.946°E
- Country: Yemen
- Governorate: Ibb Governorate
- District: Hazm al-'Udayn District

Population (2004)
  - Total: 2,856
- Time zone: UTC+3

Bani Sulaiman (Arabic: بني سليمان) is a sub-district located in Hazm al-'Udayn District, Ibb Governorate, Yemen. Bani Sulaiman had a population of 2856 according to the 2004 census.
