= Yahayr =

Yahayr يحير
- Sub-district
- Location in Yemen
- Coordinates: 14°12′23″N 44°30′16″E
- Country: Yemen
- Governorate: Ibb Governorate
- District: Ar Radmah District

Population (2004)
  - Total: 5,378
- Time zone: UTC+3

Yahayr (Arabic: يحير) is a sub-district located in al-Radmah District, Ibb Governorate, Yemen. Yahayr had a population of 5378 according to the 2004 census.
