= Bani Ahmed Wathalth =

Bani Ahmed Wathalth بني أحمد والثلث
- Sub-district
- Location in Yemen
- Coordinates: 13.90306°N 43.82806°E
- Country: Yemen
- Governorate: Ibb Governorate
- District: Far Al Udayn District

Population (2004)
  - Total: 11,160
- Time zone: UTC+3

Bani Ahmed Wathalth (Arabic: بني أحمد والثلث) is a sub-district located in Far Al Udayn District, Ibb Governorate, Yemen. Bani Ahmed Wathalth had a population of 11160 according to the 2004 census.
