= Khaw =

Khaw خاو
- Sub-district
- Location in Yemen
- Country: Yemen
- Governorate: Ibb Governorate
- District: Yarim District

Population (2004)
  - Total: 5,324
- Time zone: UTC+3

Khaw (Arabic: خاو) is a sub-district located in Yarim District, Ibb Governorate, Yemen. Khaw had a population of 5324 as of 2004.
