= Halymahh =

Halymahh حليمة
- Sub-district
- Location in Yemen
- Country: Yemen
- Governorate: Ibb Governorate
- District: Hazm al-'Udayn District

Population (2004)
  - Total: 1,427
- Time zone: UTC+3

Halymahh (Arabic: حليمة) is a sub-district located in Hazm al-'Udayn District, Ibb Governorate, Yemen. Halymahh had a population of 1427 according to the 2004 census.
