= Waraf =

Waraf وراف
- Sub-district
- Location in Yemen
- Country: Yemen
- Governorate: Ibb Governorate
- District: Jiblah District

Population (2004)
  - Total: 17,342
- Time zone: UTC+3

Waraf (Arabic: وراف) is a sub-district located in Jiblah District, Ibb Governorate, Yemen. Waraf had a population of 17,342 according to the 2004 census.
