= Bani Saba' (Ibb) =

Bani Saba' بني سباء
- Sub-district
- Location in Yemen
- Coordinates: 14°14′21″N 44°14′50″E
- Country: Yemen
- Governorate: Ibb Governorate
- District: Al Qafr District

Population (2004)
  - Total: 7,781
- Time zone: UTC+3

Bani Saba' (Arabic: بني سباء) is a sub-district located in Al Qafr District, Ibb Governorate, Yemen. Bani Saba' had a population of 7781 as of 2004.
