= Al-Qabl Al-Alla =

Al-Qabl Al-Alla القابل الأعلى
- Sub-district
- Location in Yemen
- Coordinates: 14°03′49″N 44°21′30″E
- Country: Yemen
- Governorate: Ibb Governorate
- District: Ash Sha'ar District

Population (2004)
  - Total: 4,087
- Time zone: UTC+3

Al-Qabl Al-Alla (Arabic: القابل الأعلى) is a sub-district located in al-Sha'ar District, Ibb Governorate, Yemen.Al-Qabl Al-Alla had a population of 4087 as of 2004.
