= Bait al-Sa'adi =

Bait Alsaidi بيت الصايدي بيت الصائدي
- Sub-district
- Location in Yemen
- Coordinates: 14°00′12″N 44°21′35″E
- Country: Yemen
- Governorate: Ibb Governorate
- District: Ash Sha'ar District

Population (2004)
  - Total: 4,600
- Time zone: UTC+3

Bait al-Sa'adi (Arabic: بيت الصائدي) is a sub-district located in al-Sha'ar District, Ibb Governorate, Yemen. Bait al-Sa'adi had a population of 4600 according to the 2004 census.
