= Al-Mazhar (Ibb) =

Al-Mazhar المزهر
- Sub-district
- Location in Yemen
- Coordinates: 13°51′41″N 43°56′41″E
- Country: Yemen
- Governorate: Ibb Governorate
- District: Mudhaykhirah District

Population (2004)
  - Total: 2,215
- Time zone: UTC+3

Al-Mazhar (Arabic: المزهر) is a sub-district located in Mudhaykhirah District, Ibb Governorate, Yemen. Al-Mazhar had a population of 2,215 according to the 2004 census.
