= Al-Rabadi =

Al-Rabadi الربادي
- Sub-district
- Location in Yemen
- Coordinates: 13°53′36″N 44°07′04″E
- Country: Yemen
- Governorate: Ibb Governorate
- District: Jiblah District

Population (2004)
  - Total: 16,462
- Time zone: UTC+3

Al-Rabadi (Arabic: الربادي) is a sub-district located in Jiblah District, Ibb Governorate, Yemen. Al-Rabadi had a population of 16,462 according to the 2004 census.
