= Raidah Waryad =

Raidah Waryad ريده ورياد
- Sub-district
- Location in Yemen
- Country: Yemen
- Governorate: Ibb Governorate
- District: Dhi As Sufal District

Population (2004)
  - Total: 12,528
- Time zone: UTC+3

Raidah Waryad (Arabic: ريده ورياد) is a sub-district located in Dhi al-Sufal District, Ibb Governorate, Yemen. Raidah Waryad had a population of 12528 as of 2004.
