= Blad Al Juma'i =

Blad Al Juma'i بلاد الجماعي
- Sub-district
- Location in Yemen
- Coordinates: 13°54′08″N 44°19′22″E
- Country: Yemen
- Governorate: Ibb Governorate
- District: As Sabrah District

Population (2004)
  - Total: 7,826
- Time zone: UTC+3

Blad Al Juma'i (Arabic: بلاد الجماعي) is a sub-district located in al-Sabrah District, Ibb Governorate, Yemen. Blad Al Juma'i had a population of 7826 according to the 2004 census.
