= Dhari Othman =

Dhari Othman ذاري عثمان
- Sub-district
- Location in Yemen
- Coordinates: 14°07′26″N 44°14′18″E
- Country: Yemen
- Governorate: Ibb Governorate
- District: Al Makhadir District

Population (2004)
  - Total: 6,664
- Time zone: UTC+3

Dhari Othman (Arabic: ذاري عثمان) is a sub-district located in Al Makhadir District, Ibb Governorate, Yemen. Dhari Othman had a population of 6664 as of 2004.
