= Bani al-Ward =

Bani al-Ward بني الورد
- Sub-district
- Location in Yemen
- Coordinates: 13°48′59″N 43°55′56″E
- Country: Yemen
- Governorate: Ibb Governorate
- District: Mudhaykhirah District

Population (2004)
  - Total: 1,539
- Time zone: UTC+3

Bani al-Ward (Arabic: بني الورد) is a sub-district located in Mudhaykhirah District, Ibb Governorate, Yemen. Bani al-Ward had a population of 1,539 according to the 2004 census.
