= Al-Sahul (Ibb) =

Al-Sahul السحول
- Sub-district
- Location in Yemen
- Coordinates: 14°04′46″N 44°11′08″E
- Country: Yemen
- Governorate: Ibb Governorate
- District: Al Makhadir District

Population (2004)
  - Total: 35,356
- Time zone: UTC+3

Al-Sahul (Arabic: السحول) is a sub-district located in Al Makhadir District, Ibb Governorate, Yemen. Al-Sahul had a population of 35356 as of 2004.
