= Al-Jawalih =

Al-Jawalih الجوالح
- Sub-district
- Location in Yemen
- Coordinates: 13°53′11″N 43°58′58″E
- Country: Yemen
- Governorate: Ibb Governorate
- District: Mudhaykhirah District

Population (2004)
  - Total: 8,168
- Time zone: UTC+3

Al-Jawalih (Arabic: الجوالح) is a sub-district located in Mudhaykhirah District, Ibb Governorate, Yemen. Al-Jawalih had a population of 8168 according to the 2004 census.
