= Kuman (Ibb) =

Kuman كومان
- Sub-district
- Location in Yemen
- Coordinates: 14°06′46″N 44°04′32″E
- Country: Yemen
- Governorate: Ibb Governorate
- District: Hubaysh District

Population (2004)
  - Total: 2,535
- Time zone: UTC+3

Kuman (Arabic: كومان) is a sub-district located in Hubaysh District, Ibb Governorate, Yemen. Kuman had a population of 2535 according to the 2004 census.
