= Bani Atef =

Bani Atef بني عاطف
- Sub-district
- Location in Yemen
- Coordinates: 13°47′39″N 44°18′19″E
- Country: Yemen
- Governorate: Ibb Governorate
- District: As Sabrah District

Population (2004)
  - Total: 3,772
- Time zone: UTC+3

Bani Atef (Arabic: بني عاطف) is a sub-district located in al-Sabrah District, Ibb Governorate, Yemen.Bani Atef had a population of 3772 according to the 2004 census.
