= Al-Sharqi =

Al-Sharqi الشرقي
- Sub-district
- Location in Yemen
- Coordinates: 14°04′16″N 43°50′03″E
- Country: Yemen
- Governorate: Ibb Governorate
- District: Hazm al-'Udayn District

Population (2004)
  - Total: 2,192
- Time zone: UTC+3

Al-Sharqi (Arabic: الشرقي) is a sub-district located in Hazm al-'Udayn District, Ibb Governorate, Yemen. Al-Sharqi had a population of 2192 according to the 2004 census.
