= Al-Ansiyin =

Al-Ansiyin العنسيين
- Sub-district
- Location in Yemen
- Coordinates: 13°52′51″N 44°01′31″E
- Country: Yemen
- Governorate: Ibb Governorate
- District: Dhi As Sufal District

Population (2004)
  - Total: 8,256
- Time zone: UTC+3

Al-Ansiyin (Arabic: العنسيين) is a sub-district located in Dhi al-Sufal District, Ibb Governorate, Yemen. Al-Ansiyin had a population of 8256 as of 2004.
