= Abidah (Ibb) =

Abidah عبيدة
- Sub-district
- Location in Yemen
- Coordinates: 14°21′04″N 44°20′06″E
- Country: Yemen
- Governorate: Ibb Governorate
- District: Yarim District

Population (2004)
  - Total: 5,285
- Time zone: UTC+3

Abidah (Arabic: عبيدة) is a sub-district located in Yarim District, Ibb Governorate, Yemen. Abidah had a population of 5285 as of 2004.
