= Shakheb =

Shakheb شخب
- Sub-district
- Location in Yemen
- Coordinates: 14°08′09″N 44°30′11″E
- Country: Yemen
- Governorate: Ibb Governorate
- District: An Nadirah District

Population (2004)
  - Total: 4,299
- Time zone: UTC+3
- Geocode: 8735321

Shakheb (Arabic: شخب) is a sub-district located in al-Nadirah District, Ibb Governorate, Yemen. Shakheb had a population of 4299 according to the 2004 census.
