= Al-Akhloud =

Al-Akhloud الاخلود
- Sub-district
- Location in Yemen
- Coordinates: 13°47′36″N 44°15′53″E
- Country: Yemen
- Governorate: Ibb Governorate
- District: As Sabrah District

Population (2004)
  - Total: 2,563
- Time zone: UTC+3

Al-Akhloud (Arabic: الاخلود) is a sub-district located in al-Sabrah District, Ibb Governorate, Yemen. Al-Akhloud had a population of 2563 according to the 2004 census.
