= Al-Dakhal =

Al-Dakhal الدخال
- Sub-district
- Location in Yemen
- Coordinates: 13°51′43″N 44°01′08″E
- Country: Yemen
- Governorate: Ibb Governorate
- District: Dhi As Sufal District

Population (2004)
  - Total: 6,822
- Time zone: UTC+3

Al-Dakhal (Arabic: الدخال) is a sub-district located in Dhi al-Sufal District, Ibb Governorate, Yemen. Al-Dakhal had a population of 6822 as of 2004.
