= Maqna'a =

Maqna'a مقنع
- Sub-district
- Location in Yemen
- Coordinates: 14°00′12″N 44°21′35″E
- Country: Yemen
- Governorate: Ibb Governorate
- District: Ash Sha'ar District

Population (2004)
  - Total: 3,562
- Time zone: UTC+3

Maqna'a (Arabic: مقنع) is a sub-district located in al-Sha'ar District, Ibb Governorate, Yemen. Maqna'a had a population of 3562 according to the 2004 census.
