= Sharqi Urdan =

Sharqi Urdan شرقي عردن
- village
- Location in Yemen
- Coordinates: 13°55′59.6″N 43°53′14.6″E
- Country: Yemen
- Governorate: Ibb Governorate
- District: Al Udayn District

Population (2004)
  - Total: 4,091
- Time zone: UTC+3
- Geocode: 7355953

Sharqi Urdan (Arabic: شرقي عردن) is one of the village of Uzlah Urdan, in Al Udayn District, which belongs to Ibb Governorate in Yemen. Its population was 4,091 according to the 2004 Yemen Census.
