= Al-Safi =

Al-Safi الصفي
- Sub-district
- Location in Yemen
- Coordinates: 14°10′30″N 44°13′23″E
- Country: Yemen
- Governorate: Ibb Governorate
- District: Al Makhadir District

Population (2004)
  - Total: 5,868
- Time zone: UTC+3

Al-Safi (Arabic: الصفي) is a sub-district located in Al Makhadir District, Ibb Governorate, Yemen. Al-Safi had a population of 5868 as of 2004.
