= Anamir A'la =

Anamir A'la أنامر أعلى
- Sub-district
- Location in Yemen
- Coordinates: 13°57′37″N 44°07′19″E
- Country: Yemen
- Governorate: Ibb Governorate
- District: Jiblah District

Population (2004)
  - Total: 6,519
- Time zone: UTC+3

Anamir A'la (Arabic: أنامر أعلى) is a sub-district located in Jiblah District, Ibb Governorate, Yemen. Anamir A'la had a population of 6,519 according to the 2004 census.
