= Bani Saba'a =

Bani Saba'a بني سباء
- Sub-district
- Location in Yemen
- Coordinates: 14.223889°N 44.283056°E
- Country: Yemen
- Governorate: Ibb Governorate
- District: Yarim District

Population (2004)
  - Total: 4,501
- Time zone: UTC+3

Bani Saba'a (Arabic: بني سباء) is a sub-district located in Yarim District, Ibb Governorate, Yemen. Bani Saba'a had a population of 4,501 as of 2004.
