= Maqna'a Al-Alla =

Maqna'a Al-Alla مقنع الأعلى
- Sub-district
- Location in Yemen
- Coordinates: 14°04′43″N 44°25′16″E
- Country: Yemen
- Governorate: Ibb Governorate
- District: An Nadirah District

Population (2004)
  - Total: 7,064
- Time zone: UTC+3
- Geocode: 8735317

Maqna'a Al-Alla (Arabic: مقنع الأعلى) is a sub-district located in al-Nadirah District, Ibb Governorate, Yemen. Maqna'a Al-Alla had a population of 5257 according to the 2004 census.
