= Bani Amr s-Safl =

Bani Amr s-Safl بني عمر السافل
- Sub-district
- Location in Yemen
- Coordinates: 14°18′23″N 44°03′23″E
- Country: Yemen
- Governorate: Ibb Governorate
- District: Al Qafr District

Population (2004)
  - Total: 9,384

Bani Amr s-Safl (Arabic: بني عمر السافل) is a sub-district located in Al Qafr District, Ibb Governorate, Yemen. Bani Amr s-Safl had a population of 9384 as of 2004.
