= Al-Mashki =

Al-Mashki المشكي
- Sub-district
- Location in Yemen
- Coordinates: 13.92754°N 44.29217°E
- Country: Yemen
- Governorate: Ibb Governorate
- District: Ba'dan District

Population (2004)
  - Total: 6,298
- Time zone: UTC+3

Al-Mashki (Arabic: المشكي) is a sub-district located in Ba'dan District, Ibb Governorate, Yemen. Al-Mashki had a population of 6298 as of 2004.
