= Al-Abroh =

Al-Abroh الابروة
- Sub-district
- Location in Yemen
- Coordinates: 13°45′12″N 44°16′20″E
- Country: Yemen
- Governorate: Ibb Governorate
- District: As Sabrah District

Population (2004)
  - Total: 5,522
- Time zone: UTC+3

Al-Abroh (Arabic: الابروة) is a sub-district located in al-Sabrah District, Ibb Governorate, Yemen. Al-Abroh had a population of 5522 according to the 2004 census.
