= Hadfan =

Hadfan هدفان
- Sub-district
- Location in Yemen
- Coordinates: 13°52′41″N 44°11′33″E
- Country: Yemen
- Governorate: Ibb Governorate
- District: As Sayyani District

Population (2004)
  - Total: 16,608
- Time zone: UTC+3

Hadfan (Arabic: هدفان) is a sub-district located in al-Sayyani District, Ibb Governorate, Yemen. Hadfan had a population of 16608 according to the 2004 census.
