= Ali Abdul Mughni =

Yemeni military officer and revolutionary (1935–1962)

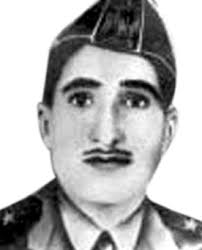
- Native name: علي عبد المغني
- Born: 1935; As Saddah District, Ibb Governorate, Mutawakkilite Kingdom of Yemen
- Died: 8 October 1962 (aged 26–27) Sirwah District , Marib Governorate
- Allegiance: North Yemen
- Branch: North Yemeni Army
- Service years: 1958–1962
- Rank: 2nd Lieutenant
- Commands: Free Offers Organization
- Conflicts: North Yemen Civil War †

Ali Abdul Mughni (Arabic: علي عبد المغني; 1935– 8 October 1962) was a Yemeni military officer and revolutionary. He was one of principal leaders of the Yemeni revolution of 1962 that toppled the Mutawakkilite Kingdom of Yemen, leading to the establishment of the Yemen Arab Republic. He has been known as "the Architect of the 1962 Revolution.

== Biography ==
Abdul Mughni was born in 1935 in Al-Masqah village, Al Saddah District, Ibb Governorate. In 1948 he moved to Sana'a to continue his basic education at Al-Aytam school, and in 1958 he joined the Yemeni Military Academy. He participated in establishing and leading Free Officers Organization, a group of army officers, that played a key role in the revolution with a coup d'état to depose Imam Ahmad bin Yahya and announced the 26 September Revolution on Radio Sanaa, declaring the Yemen Arab Republic in 1962. Ali led a military campaign against the royalists led by Hassan ibn Yahya in Marib and was killed in action in Sirwah on 8 October 1962.
