= Bani Mubarez =

Bani Mubarez بني مبارز
- Sub-district
- Location in Yemen
- Coordinates: 14°16′52″N 44°05′58″E
- Country: Yemen
- Governorate: Ibb Governorate
- District: Al Qafr District

Population (2004)
  - Total: 12,865
- Time zone: UTC+3

Bani Mubarez (Arabic: بني مبارز) is a sub-district located in Al Qafr District, Ibb Governorate, Yemen. Bani Saif al-Alli had a population of 12865 as of 2004.
