= Al-Safah =

Al-Safah الصفة
- Sub-district
- Location in Yemen
- Coordinates: 13°53′06″N 44°02′45″E
- Country: Yemen
- Governorate: Ibb Governorate
- District: Dhi As Sufal District

Population (2004)
  - Total: 9,459
- Time zone: UTC+3

Al-Safah (Arabic: الصفة) is a sub-district located in Dhi al-Sufal District, Ibb Governorate, Yemen. Al-Safah had a population of 9459 as of 2004.
