= Al Azhour =

Al Azhour الازهور
- Sub-district
- Location in Yemen
- Coordinates: 13°48′58″N 44°18′45″E
- Country: Yemen
- Governorate: Ibb Governorate
- District: As Sabrah District

Population (2004)
  - Total: 3,567
- Time zone: UTC+3

Al Azhour (Arabic: الازهور) is a sub-district located in al-Sabrah District, Ibb Governorate, Yemen. Al Azhour had a population of 3567 according to the 2004 census.
