= Bani Al-Dhahatin =

Bani Al-Dhahatin بني الضاحتين
- Sub-district
- Location in Yemen
- Coordinates: 14°02′49″N 44°05′12″E
- Country: Yemen
- Governorate: Ibb Governorate
- District: Hubaysh District

Population (2004)
  - Total: 9,297
- Time zone: UTC+3

Bani Al-Dhahatin (Arabic: بني الضاحتين) is a sub-district located in Hubaysh District, Ibb Governorate, Yemen. Bani Al-Dhahatin had a population of 9297 according to the 2004 census.
