= Al Aradhah =

Al Aradhah العارضة
- Sub-district
- Location in Yemen
- Coordinates: 14°00′40″N 44°26′54″E
- Country: Yemen
- Governorate: Ibb Governorate
- District: An Nadirah District

Population (2004)
  - Total: 1,995
- Time zone: UTC+3
- Geocode: 8735315

Al Aradhah (Arabic: العارضة) is a sub-district located in al-Nadirah District, Ibb Governorate, Yemen. Al Aradhah had a population of 1995 according to the 2004 census.
