= Al-Azraq (Ibb) =

Al-Azareq الازارق
- Sub-district
- Location in Yemen
- Coordinates: 13°45′05″N 44°11′42″E
- Country: Yemen
- Governorate: Ibb Governorate
- District: As Sayyani District

Population (2004)
  - Total: 6,001
- Time zone: UTC+3

Al-Azareq (Arabic: الازارق) is a sub-district located in al-Sayyani District, Ibb Governorate, Yemen. Al-Azareq had a population of 6001 according to the 2004 census.
