= Ajayb =

Ajayb عجيب
- Sub-district
- Location in Yemen
- Coordinates: 14°10′16″N 44°31′42″E
- Country: Yemen
- Governorate: Ibb Governorate
- District: Ar Radmah District

Population (2004)
  - Total: 5,622
- Time zone: UTC+3

Ajayb (Arabic: عجيب) is a sub-district located in al-Radmah District, Ibb Governorate, Yemen. Ajayb had a population of 5622 according to the 2004 census.
