= Al-Aqabah (Ibb) =

Al-Aqabah العاقبة
- Sub-district
- Location in Yemen
- Coordinates: 13°53′46″N 43°42′26″E
- Country: Yemen
- Governorate: Ibb Governorate
- District: Far Al Udayn District

Population (2004)
  - Total: 17,231
- Time zone: UTC+3

Al-Aqabah (Arabic: العاقبة) is a sub-district located in Far Al Udayn District, Ibb Governorate, Yemen. Al-Aqabah had a population of 17231 according to the 2004 census.
