= Matayah =

Matayah مطاية
- Sub-district
- Location in Yemen
- Coordinates: 13°57′05″N 44°19′37″E
- Country: Yemen
- Governorate: Ibb Governorate
- District: As Sabrah District

Population (2004)
  - Total: 6,830
- Time zone: UTC+3

Matayah (Arabic: مطاية) is a sub-district located in al-Sabrah District, Ibb Governorate, Yemen. Matayah had a population of 6,830 according to the 2004 census.
