= Al-Wast =

Al-Wast الوسط
- Sub-district
- Location in Yemen
- Coordinates: 14°03′40″N 44°19′28″E
- Country: Yemen
- Governorate: Ibb Governorate
- District: Ash Sha'ar District

Population (2004)
  - Total: 5,625
- Time zone: UTC+3

Al-Wast (Arabic: الوسط) is a sub-district located in al-Sha'ar District, Ibb Governorate, Yemen. Al-Wast had a population of 5625 as of 2004.
