= Bani Maslam =

Bani Maslam بني مسلم
- Sub-district
- Location in Yemen
- Coordinates: 14°18′26″N 44°14′51″E
- Country: Yemen
- Governorate: Ibb Governorate
- District: Al Qafr District

Population (2004)
  - Total: 12,599
- Time zone: UTC+3

Bani Maslam (Arabic: بني مسلم) is a sub-district located in Al Qafr District, Ibb Governorate, Yemen. Bani Maslam had a population of 12599 as of 2004.
