= Al-Sha'war =

Al-Sha'war الشعاور
- Sub-district
- Location in Yemen
- Country: Yemen
- Governorate: Ibb Governorate
- District: Hazm al-'Udayn District

Population (2004)
  - Total: 6,149
- Time zone: UTC+3

Al-Sha'war (Arabic: الشعاور) is a sub-district located in Hazm al-'Udayn District, Ibb Governorate, Yemen. Al-Sha'war has a population of 6149 according to the 2004 census.
