= Al-Afyush =

Al-Afyush الافيوش
- Sub-district
- Location in Yemen
- Coordinates: 13°50′34″N 43°52′05″E
- Country: Yemen
- Governorate: Ibb Governorate
- District: Mudhaykhirah District

Population (2004)
  - Total: 8,870
- Time zone: UTC+3

Al-Afyush (Arabic: الافيوش) is a sub-district located in Mudhaykhirah District, Ibb Governorate, Yemen. Al-Afyush had a population of 8,870 according to the 2004 census.
