= Dhi Qahm =

Dhi Qahm ذي قحم
- Sub-district
- Location in Yemen
- Country: Yemen
- Governorate: Ibb Governorate
- District: Ba'dan District

Population (2004)
  - Total: 2,273
- Time zone: UTC+3

Dhi Qahm (Arabic: ذي قحم) is a sub-district located in Ba'dan District, Ibb Governorate, Yemen. Dhi Qahm had a population of 2273 as of 2004.
