= Al Muqaraea =

Al Muqaraea المقرعة
- Country: Yemen
- Governorate: Ibb

Population (2004)
  - Total: 52
- Time zone: Yemen Standard Time

Al Muqaraea (Arabic: المقرعة) is a village in Al Udayn District. It is located in the Ibb Governorate, According to the 2004 census it had a population of 52 people.
