= Qahzah =

Qahzah قحزة
- Sub-district
- Location in Yemen
- Coordinates: 14.13501°N 44.06793°E
- Country: Yemen
- Governorate: Ibb Governorate
- District: Hubaysh District

Population (2004)
  - Total: 5,429
- Time zone: UTC+3

Qahzah (Arabic: قحزة) is a sub-district located in Hubaysh District, Ibb Governorate, Yemen. Qahzah had a population of 5429 according to the 2004 census.
