= Anamir =

Anamir انامر
- Sub-district
- Country: Yemen
- Governorate: Ibb Governorate
- District: Al Dhihar district

Population (2004)
  - Total: 13,272
- Time zone: UTC+3

Anamir (Arabic: انامر) is a sub-district located in Al Dhihar district, Ibb Governorate, Yemen. Anamir had a population of 11187 as of 2004.
