= Zabid (Ibb) =

Zabid زبيد
- Sub-district
- Location in Yemen
- Coordinates: 13°46′52″N 44°20′09″E
- Country: Yemen
- Governorate: Ibb Governorate
- District: As Sabrah District

Population (2004)
  - Total: 7,436
- Time zone: UTC+3

Zabid (Arabic: زبيد) is a sub-district located in al-Sabrah District, Ibb Governorate, Yemen. Zabid had a population of 7436 according to the 2004 census.
