= Al-Fara'i =

Al-Fara'i الفراعي
- Sub-district
- Location in Yemen
- Coordinates: 14°02′13″N 44°00′28″E
- Country: Yemen
- Governorate: Ibb Governorate
- District: Hubaysh District

Population (2004)
  - Total: 2,465
- Time zone: UTC+3

Al-Fara'i (Arabic: الفراعي) is a sub-district located in Hubaysh District, Ibb Governorate, Yemen. Al-Fara'i had a population of 2465 according to the 2004 census.
