= Amid al-Kharij =

Amid al-Kharij عميد الخارج
- Sub-district
- Location in Yemen
- Coordinates: 13°47′44″N 44°10′03″E
- Country: Yemen
- Governorate: Ibb Governorate
- District: As Sayyani District

Population (2004)
  - Total: 7,357
- Time zone: UTC+3

Amid al-Kharij (Arabic: عميد الخارج) is a sub-district located in al-Sayyani District, Ibb Governorate, Yemen. Amid al-Kharij had a population of 7357 according to the 2004 census.
