= Yarys =

Yarys يريس
- Sub-district
- Location in Yemen
- Country: Yemen
- Governorate: Ibb Governorate
- District: Hazm al-'Udayn District

Population (2004)
  - Total: 7,296
- Time zone: UTC+3

Yarys (Arabic: يريس) is a sub-district located in Hazm al-'Udayn District, Ibb Governorate, Yemen. Yarys had a population of 7296 according to the 2004 census.
