= Al-Shara'i =

Al-Shara'i الشراعي
- Sub-district
- Location in Yemen
- Coordinates: 13°54′03″N 44°05′19″E
- Country: Yemen
- Governorate: Ibb Governorate
- District: Jiblah District

Population (2004)
  - Total: 7,616
- Time zone: UTC+3

Al-Shara'i (Arabic: الشراعي) is a sub-district located in Jiblah District, Ibb Governorate, Yemen. Al-Shara'i had a population of 7,616 according to the 2004 census.
