= Haqin =

Haqin حقين
- Sub-district
- Location in Yemen
- Country: Yemen
- Governorate: Ibb Governorate
- District: Hazm al-'Udayn District

Population (2004)
  - Total: 16,168
- Time zone: UTC+3

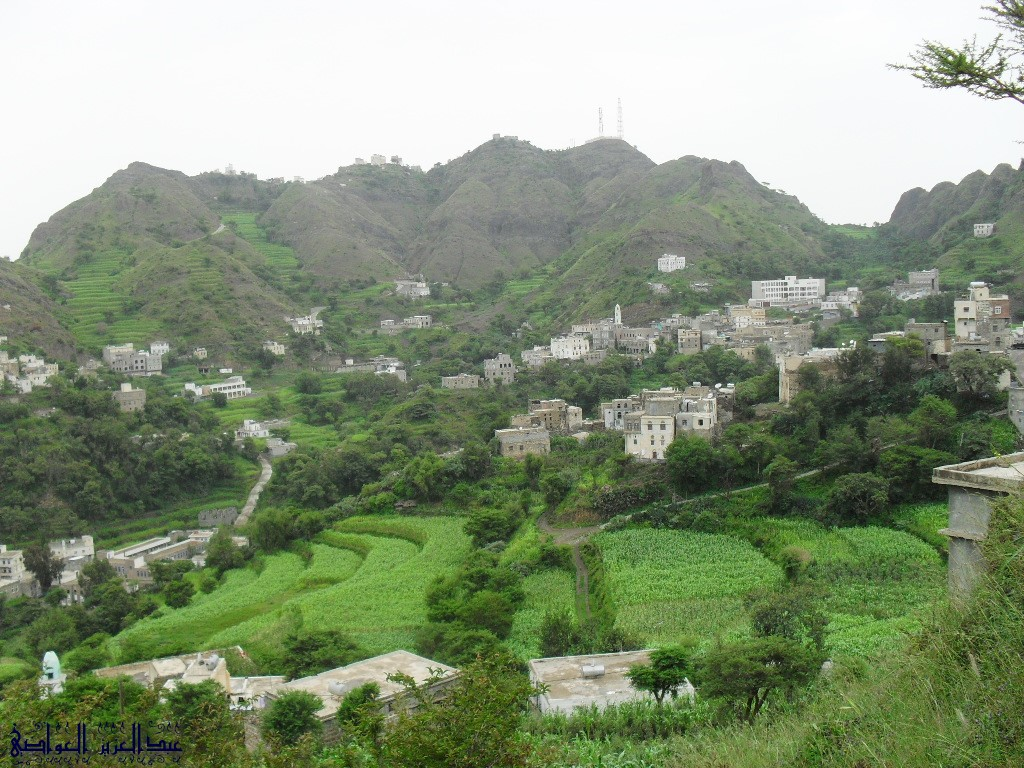

Haqin (Arabic: حقين) is a sub-district located in Hazm al-'Udayn District, Ibb Governorate, Yemen. Haqin had a population of 16168 according to the 2004 census.
