= Yarim (Ibb) =

Yarim يريم
- Sub-district
- Location in Yemen
- Coordinates: 14°17′38″N 44°22′54″E
- Country: Yemen
- Governorate: Ibb Governorate
- District: Yarim District

Population (2004)
  - Total: 46,498
- Time zone: UTC+3

Yarim (Arabic: يريم) is a sub-district located in Yarim District, Ibb Governorate, Yemen. Yarim had a population of 46498 as of 2004.
