= Al-Arbiyin =

Al-Arbiyin العربيين
- Sub-district
- Location in Yemen
- Coordinates: 13°47′41″N 44°14′41″E
- Country: Yemen
- Governorate: Ibb Governorate
- District: As Sayyani District

Population (2004)
  - Total: 8,684
- Time zone: UTC+3

Al-Arbiyin (Arabic: العربيين) is a sub-district located in al-Sayyani District, Ibb Governorate, Yemen. Al-Arbiyin had a population of 8684 according to the 2004 census.
