= Al-Habalh =

Al-Habalh الحبلة
- Sub-district
- Location in Yemen
- Coordinates: 13°51′58″N 44°02′31″E
- Country: Yemen
- Governorate: Ibb Governorate
- District: Dhi As Sufal District

Population (2004)
  - Total: 3,091
- Time zone: UTC+3

Al-Habalh (Arabic: الحبلة) is a sub-district located in Dhi al-Sufal District, Ibb Governorate, Yemen. Al-Habalh had a population of 3091 as of 2004.
