= Al-Karabah =

Al-Karabah الكرابة
- Sub-district
- Location in Yemen
- Coordinates: 14°26′03″N 44°03′51″E
- Country: Yemen
- Governorate: Ibb Governorate
- District: Al Qafr District

Population (2004)
  - Total: 1,646
- Time zone: UTC+3

Al-Karabah (Arabic: الكرابة) is a sub-district located in Al Qafr District, Ibb Governorate, Yemen. Al-Karabah had a population of 1646 as of 2004.
