= Badha'a =

Badha'a بضعة
- Sub-district
- Location in Yemen
- Coordinates: 14°05′53″N 44°15′11″E
- Country: Yemen
- Governorate: Ibb Governorate
- District: Al Makhadir District

Population (2004)
  - Total: 3,779
- Time zone: UTC+3

Badha'a (Arabic: بضعة) is a sub-district located in Al Makhadir District, Ibb Governorate, Yemen. Badha'a had a population of 3,779 as of 2004.
