= Shizr (Ibb) =

Shizr شيزر
- Sub-district
- Location in Yemen
- Coordinates: 14°15′14″N 44°33′44″E
- Country: Yemen
- Governorate: Ibb Governorate
- District: Ar Radmah District

Population (2004)
  - Total: 5,103
- Time zone: UTC+3

Shizr (Arabic: شيزر) is a sub-district located in al-Radmah District, Ibb Governorate, Yemen.Shizr had a population of 5103 according to the 2004 census.
