= Hamyar =

Hamyar حمير
- Sub-district
- Location in Yemen
- Coordinates: 13°50′59″N 43°59′21″E
- Country: Yemen
- Governorate: Ibb Governorate
- District: Al Qafr District

Population (2004)
  - Total: 8,301
- Time zone: UTC+3

Hamyar (Arabic: حمير) is a sub-district located in Al Qafr District, Ibb Governorate, Yemen. Hamyar had a population of 8,301 as of 2004.
