= Al-Sayf =

Al-Sayf السيف
- Sub-district
- Location in Yemen
- Coordinates: 13°51′36″N 44°03′48″E
- Country: Yemen
- Governorate: Ibb Governorate
- District: Dhi As Sufal District

Population (2004)
  - Total: 4,499
- Time zone: UTC+3

Al-Sayf (Arabic: السيف) is a sub-district located in Dhi al-Sufal District, Ibb Governorate, Yemen. Al-Sayf had a population of 4499 as of 2004.
