= Al-Majza'a =

Al-Majza'a المجزع
- Sub-district
- Location in Yemen
- Coordinates: 13°51′20″N 44°15′09″E
- Country: Yemen
- Governorate: Ibb Governorate
- District: As Sayyani District

Population (2004)
  - Total: 3,970
- Time zone: UTC+3

Al-Majza'a (Arabic: ألمجزع) is a sub-district located in al-Sayyani District, Ibb Governorate, Yemen. Al-Majza'a had a population of 3970 according to the 2004 census.
