= Al-Asyour =

Al-Asyour الأصيور
- Sub-district
- Location in Yemen
- Coordinates: 14°03′20″N 43°57′19″E
- Country: Yemen
- Governorate: Ibb Governorate
- District: Hazm al-'Udayn District

Population (2004)
  - Total: 2,204
- Time zone: UTC+3

Al-Asyour (Arabic: الأصيور) is a sub-district located in Hazm al-'Udayn District, Ibb Governorate, Yemen. Al-Asyour had a population of 2204 according to the 2004 census.
