= Al-Hads =

Al-Hads الهادس
- Sub-district
- Location in Yemen
- Coordinates: 13°53′30″N 44°13′47″E
- Country: Yemen
- Governorate: Ibb Governorate
- District: As Sayyani District

Population (2004)
  - Total: 15,290
- Time zone: UTC+3

Al-Hads (Arabic: الهادس) is a sub-district located in al-Sayyani District, Ibb Governorate, Yemen. Al-Hads had a population of 15290 according to the 2004 census.
