= Wadi Sayr =

Wadi Sayr وادي سير
- Sub-district
- Location in Yemen
- Coordinates: 13°46′34″N 44°13′39″E
- Country: Yemen
- Governorate: Ibb Governorate
- District: As Sayyani District

Population (2004)
  - Total: 1,852
- Time zone: UTC+3

Wadi Sayr (Arabic: وادي سير) is a sub-district located in al-Sayyani District, Ibb Governorate, Yemen. It had a population of 1852 according to the 2004 census.
