= Haddah (Ibb) =

Haddah حدة
- Sub-district
- Location in Yemen
- Coordinates: 14°00′58″N 44°33′12″E
- Country: Yemen
- Governorate: Ibb Governorate
- District: An Nadirah District

Population (2004)
  - Total: 4,352
- Time zone: UTC+3
- Geocode: 8735310

Haddah (Arabic: حدة) is a sub-district located in al-Nadirah District, Ibb Governorate, Yemen. Haddah had a population of 4352 as of 2004.
