= Al Bakrah =

- Sub-district
- Location in Yemen
- Coordinates: 14°09′20″N 44°36′39″E
- Country: Yemen
- Governorate: Ibb Governorate
- District: Ar Radmah District

Population (2004)
  - Total: 6,338
- Time zone: UTC+3

Al Bakrah (Arabic: البكرة) is a sub-district located in al-Radmah District, Ibb Governorate, Yemen. Al Bakrah had a population of 6338 according to the 2004 census.
