= Al-Dhihar (Ibb) =

Al-Dhihar الظهار
- Sub-district
- Country: Yemen
- Governorate: Ibb Governorate
- District: Al Dhihar district

Population (2004)
  - Total: 124,621
- Time zone: UTC+3

Al-Dhihar (Arabic: الظهار) is a sub-district located in Al Dhihar district, Ibb Governorate, Yemen. Al-Dhihar had a population of 124621 as of 2004.
