= Al-Ma'ydhah =

Al-Ma'ydhah المعيظة
- Sub-district
- Location in Yemen
- Coordinates: 14°06′44″N 43°47′10″E
- Country: Yemen
- Governorate: Ibb Governorate
- District: Hazm al-'Udayn District

Population (2004)
  - Total: 1,832
- Time zone: UTC+3

Al-Ma'ydhah (Arabic: المعيظة) is a sub-district located in Hazm al-'Udayn District, Ibb Governorate, Yemen. Al-Ma'ydhah had a population of 1832 according to the 2004 census.
