= Al-Aba'wn =

Al-Aba'wn الأبعون
- Sub-district
- Location in Yemen
- Coordinates: 14°00′54″N 43°56′10″E
- Country: Yemen
- Governorate: Ibb Governorate
- District: Hazm al-'Udayn District

Population (2004)
  - Total: 3,486
- Time zone: UTC+3

Al-Aba'wn (Arabic: الأبعون) is a sub-district located in Hazm al-'Udayn District, Ibb Governorate, Yemen. Al-Aba'wn had a population of 3486 according to the 2004 census.
