= Jabal Ra'wayn =

Jabal Ra'wayn جبل رعوين
- Sub-district
- Location in Yemen
- Country: Yemen
- Governorate: Ibb Governorate
- District: Jiblah District

Population (2004)
  - Total: 4,081
- Time zone: UTC+3

Jabal Ra'wayn (Arabic: جبل رعوين) is a sub-district located in Jiblah District, Ibb Governorate, Yemen. Jabal Ra'wayn had a population of 4081 according to the 2004 census.
