= Al-Ahmul =

Al-Ahmul الاهمول
- Sub-district
- Location in Yemen
- Coordinates: 13°56′26″N 43°44′12″E
- Country: Yemen
- Governorate: Ibb Governorate
- District: Far Al Udayn District

Population (2004)
  - Total: 8,928
- Time zone: UTC+3

Al-Ahmul (Arabic: الاهمول) is a sub-district located in Far Al Udayn District, Ibb Governorate, Yemen. Al-Ahmul had a population of 8928 according to the 2004 census.
