= Al-Za'ala =

Al-Za'ala الزعلاء
- Sub-district
- Location in Yemen
- Coordinates: 14°06′35″N 44°25′24″E
- Country: Yemen
- Governorate: Ibb Governorate
- District: As Saddah District

Population (2004)
  - Total: 5,727
- Time zone: UTC+3

Al-Za'ala (Arabic: الزعلاء) is a sub-district located in al-Saddah District, Ibb Governorate, Yemen. Al-Za'ala had a population of 5727 according to the 2004 census.
