= Al-Salq =

Al-Salq السلق
- Sub-district
- Location in Yemen
- Coordinates: 14°02′48″N 44°02′06″E
- Country: Yemen
- Governorate: Ibb Governorate
- District: Hubaysh District

Population (2004)
  - Total: 3,725
- Time zone: UTC+3

Al-Salq (Arabic: السلق) is a sub-district located in Hubaysh District, Ibb Governorate, Yemen. Al-Salq had a population of 3725 according to the 2004 census.
