= Al-Asabih =

Al-Asabih الاصابح
- Sub-district
- Location in Yemen
- Coordinates: 13°53′51″N 44°03′50″E
- Country: Yemen
- Governorate: Ibb Governorate
- District: Jiblah District

Population (2004)
  - Total: 4,053
- Time zone: UTC+3

Al-Asabih (Arabic: الاصابح) is a sub-district located in Jiblah District, Ibb Governorate, Yemen. Al-Asabih had a population of 4,053 according to the 2004 census.
