= Al-Akhmas =

Al-Akhmas الاخماس
- Sub-district
- Country: Yemen
- Governorate: Ibb Governorate
- District: Far Al Udayn District

Population (2004)
  - Total: 12,568
- Time zone: UTC+3

Al-Akhmas (Arabic: الاخماس) is a sub-district located in Far Al Udayn District, Ibb Governorate, Yemen. Al-Akhmas had a population of 12568 according to the 2004 census.
