= Halian =

Halian حليان
- Sub-district
- Location in Yemen
- Coordinates: 13°53′27″N 44°00′25″E
- Country: Yemen
- Governorate: Ibb Governorate
- District: Mudhaykhirah District

Population (2004)
  - Total: 6,094
- Time zone: UTC+3

Halian (Arabic: حليان) is a sub-district located in Mudhaykhirah District, Ibb Governorate, Yemen. Halianhad a population of 6,094 according to the 2004 census.
