= Blad Asha'abi Al-Allia =

Blad Asha'abi Al-Allia بلاد الشعيبي العليا
- Sub-district
- Location in Yemen
- Coordinates: 13°53′52″N 44°21′58″E
- Country: Yemen
- Governorate: Ibb Governorate
- District: As Sabrah District

Population (2004)
  - Total: 5,432
- Time zone: UTC+3

Blad Asha'abi Al-Allia (Arabic: بلاد الشعيبي العليا) is a sub-district located in al-Sabrah District, Ibb Governorate, Yemen. Blad Asha'abi Al-Allia had a population of 5432 according to the 2004 census.
