= Al-Qa'idah, Yemen =

City in Yemen

Coordinates: 13°45′23″N 44°08′02″E

Al-Qa'idah
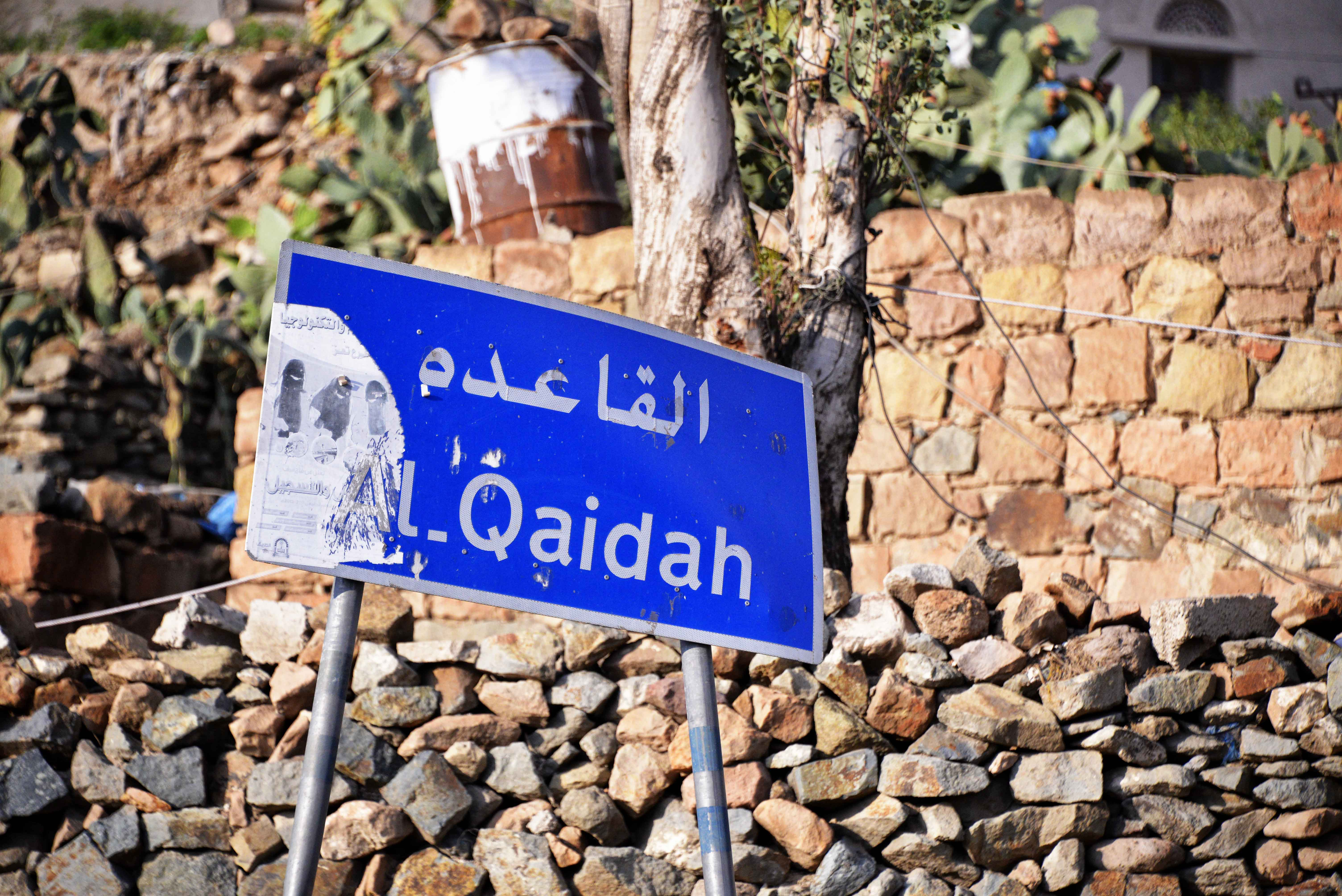
- Interactive map of Al-Qa'idah
- Country: Yemen
- Governorate: Ibb Governorate
- District: Dhi as-Sufal

Population (2004)
  - Total: 39,254
  - Estimate (2014): 52,754
- Time zone: UTC+3 (Yemen Standard Time)

Al-Qa'idah (Arabic: القاعدة, romanized: al-Qa'idah) is a city in Yemen, Ibb Governorate, located 22 km south from Ibb. As of 2014, it has an estimated population of 52,754, with the 2004 census population being 39,254. It is located on the road between Ibb and Ta'izz.

== History ==
The earliest mention of the city was during the first Ottoman campaign against Yemen in 1537.

The city was founded as a trade city, due to its location on the route of commercial caravans coming from Aden to Sana'a.
