= Al-Turbah =

Al-Turbah التربة
- Sub-district
- Location in Yemen
- Coordinates: 13°43′10″N 44°18′12″E
- Country: Yemen
- Governorate: Ibb Governorate
- District: As Sabrah District

Population (2004)
  - Total: 4,638
- Time zone: UTC+3

Al-Turbah (Arabic: التربة) is a sub-district located in al-Sabrah District, Ibb Governorate, Yemen. Al-Turbah had a population of 4638 according to the 2004 census.
