= Al-Mazahn =

Al-Mazahn المزاحن
- Sub-district
- Location in Yemen
- Coordinates: 13°59′12″N 43°49′37″E
- Country: Yemen
- Governorate: Ibb Governorate
- District: Far Al Udayn District

Population (2004)
  - Total: 12,447
- Time zone: UTC+3

Al-Mazahn (Arabic: المزاحن) is a sub-district located in Far Al Udayn District, Ibb Governorate, Yemen. Al-Mazahn had a population of 12447 according to the 2004 census.
