= Sharih =

Sharih شريح
- Sub-district
- Location in Yemen
- Coordinates: 14°06′55″N 44°34′52″E
- Country: Yemen
- Governorate: Ibb Governorate
- District: An Nadirah District

Population (2004)
  - Total: 2,505
- Time zone: UTC+3
- Geocode: 8735322

Sharih (Arabic: شريح) is a sub-district located in al-Nadirah District, Ibb Governorate, Yemen. Sharih had a population of 2505 according to the 2004 census.
