= Qaddas =

Qaddas قداس
- Sub-district
- Location in Yemen
- Coordinates: 14°02′04″N 43°49′40″E
- Country: Yemen
- Governorate: Ibb Governorate
- District: Al Udayn District

Population (2004)
  - Total: 6,286
- Time zone: UTC+3
- Geocode: 8735377

Qaddas (Arabic: قداس) is a sub-district located in Al Udayn District, Ibb Governorate, Yemen. Qaddas had a population of 6286 according to the 2004 census.
