= Bani Munabah =

Bani Munabah بني منبة
- Sub-district
- Location in Yemen
- Coordinates: 14.24406°N 44.33692°E
- Country: Yemen
- Governorate: Ibb Governorate
- District: Yarim District

Population (2004)
  - Total: 23,437
- Time zone: UTC+3

Bani Munabah (Arabic: بني منبة) is a sub-district located in Yarim District, Ibb Governorate, Yemen. Bani Munabah had a population of 23,437 as of 2004.
