= Rab' Dhalma =

Rab' Dhalma ربع ظلمة
- Sub-district
- Location in Yemen
- Coordinates: 14°06′17″N 44°07′25″E
- Country: Yemen
- Governorate: Ibb Governorate
- District: Hubaysh District

Population (2004)
  - Total: 8,977
- Time zone: UTC+3

Rab' Dhalma (Arabic: ربع ظلمة) is a sub-district located in Hubaysh District, Ibb Governorate, Yemen. Rab' Dhalma had a population of 8977 according to the 2004 census.
