= Mudhaykhirah (Ibb) =

Mudhaykhirah مذيخرة
- Sub-district
- Location in Yemen
- Coordinates: 13°52′43″N 43°57′42″E
- Country: Yemen
- Governorate: Ibb Governorate
- District: Mudhaykhirah District

Population (2004)
  - Total: 5,319
- Time zone: UTC+3

Mudhaykhirah (Arabic: مذيخرة) is a sub-district located in Mudhaykhirah District, Ibb Governorate, Yemen. Mudhaykhirah had a population of 5,319 according to the 2004 census.
