= Al-Aja'wm =

Al-Aja'wm الاجعوم
- Sub-district
- Location in Yemen
- Coordinates: 14°05′37″N 43°56′58″E
- Country: Yemen
- Governorate: Ibb Governorate
- District: Hazm al-'Udayn District

Population (2004)
  - Total: 5,690
- Time zone: UTC+3

Al-Aja'wm (Arabic: الاجعوم) is a sub-district located in Hazm al-'Udayn District, Ibb Governorate, Yemen. Al-Aja'wm had a population of 5690 according to the 2004 census.
