= Sha'b al-Muraysi =

Sha'b al-Muraysi شعب المريسي
- Sub-district
- Location in Yemen
- Coordinates: 14°02′09″N 44°30′55″E
- Country: Yemen
- Governorate: Ibb Governorate
- District: An Nadirah District

Population (2004)
  - Total: 5,257
- Time zone: UTC+3
- Geocode: 8735311

Sha'b al-Muraysi (Arabic: شعب المريسي) is a sub-district located in al-Nadirah District, Ibb Governorate, Yemen. Sha'b al-Muraysi had a population of 5257 according to the 2004 census.
