= Shawa'at =

Shawa'at شوائط
- Sub-district
- Location in Yemen
- Country: Yemen
- Governorate: Ibb Governorate
- District: Dhi As Sufal District

Population (2004)
  - Total: 4,834
- Time zone: UTC+3

Shawa'at (Arabic: شوائط) is a sub-district located in Dhi al-Sufal District, Ibb Governorate, Yemen. Shawa'at had a population of 4,834 as of 2004.
