= Jabal Harim =

Jabal Harim جبل حريم
- Sub-district
- Location in Yemen
- Country: Yemen
- Governorate: Ibb Governorate
- District: Hazm al-'Udayn District

Population (2004)
  - Total: 4,654
- Time zone: UTC+3

Jabal Harim (Arabic: جبل حريم) is a sub-district located in Hazm al-'Udayn District, Ibb Governorate, Yemen. Jabal Harim had a population of 4654 according to the 2004 census.
