= Al-Asha'wb =

Al-Asha'wb الاشعوب
- Sub-district
- Location in Yemen
- Coordinates: 13°49′29″N 43°57′23″E
- Country: Yemen
- Governorate: Ibb Governorate
- District: Mudhaykhirah District

Population (2004)
  - Total: 18,134
- Time zone: UTC+3

Al-Asha'wb (Arabic: الاشعوب) is a sub-district located in Mudhaykhirah District, Ibb Governorate, Yemen. Al-Asha'wb had a population of 18,134 according to the 2004 census.
