= Jabal Khadhra =

Jabal Khadhra جبل خضراء
- Sub-district
- Location in Yemen
- Country: Yemen
- Governorate: Ibb Governorate
- District: Hubaysh District

Population (2004)
  - Total: 9,083
- Time zone: UTC+3

Jabal Khadhra (Arabic: جبل خضراء) is a sub-district located in Hubaysh District, Ibb Governorate, Yemen. Jabal Khadhra had a population of 9083 according to the 2004 census.
