= Al Masadah =

Al Masadah المساعدة
- Sub-district
- Location in Yemen
- Coordinates: 13°44′50″N 44°20′10″E
- Country: Yemen
- Governorate: Ibb Governorate
- District: As Sabrah District

Population (2004)
  - Total: 3,410
- Time zone: UTC+3

Al Masadah (Arabic: المساعدة) is a sub-district located in al-Sabrah District, Ibb Governorate, Yemen. Al Masadah had a population of 3410 according to the 2004 census.
