= Al-Abs =

Al-Abs العبس
- Sub-district
- Location in Yemen
- Coordinates: 14°04′48″N 44°17′54″E
- Country: Yemen
- Governorate: Ibb Governorate
- District: Ash Sha'ar District

Population (2004)
  - Total: 2,893
- Time zone: UTC+3

Al-Abs (Arabic: العبس) is a sub-district located in al-Sha'ar District, Ibb Governorate, Yemen. Al-Abs had a population of 2893 as of 2004.
