= Bani As'ad =

Bani As'ad بني أسعد
- Sub-district
- Location in Yemen
- Coordinates: 14°07′05″N 43°49′57″E
- Country: Yemen
- Governorate: Ibb Governorate
- District: Hazm al-'Udayn District

Population (2004)
  - Total: 4,805
- Time zone: UTC+3

Bani As'ad (Arabic: بني أسعد) is a sub-district located in Hazm al-'Udayn District, Ibb Governorate, Yemen. Bani Asad had a population of 4805 according to the 2004 census.
