= Al-Shahli =

Al-Shahli الشهلي
- Sub-district
- Location in Yemen
- Coordinates: 13°54′52″N 44°02′32″E
- Country: Yemen
- Governorate: Ibb Governorate
- District: Jiblah District

Population (2004)
  - Total: 3,526
- Time zone: UTC+3

Al-Shahli (Arabic: الشهلي) is a sub-district located in Jiblah District, Ibb Governorate, Yemen. Al-Shahli had a population of 3526 according to the 2004 census.
