= Jabal Usam =

Jabal Usam جبل عصام
- Sub-district
- Location in Yemen
- Coordinates: 14°10′54″N 44°28′02″E
- Country: Yemen
- Governorate: Ibb Governorate
- District: As Saddah District

Population (2004)
  - Total: 4,814
- Time zone: UTC+3

Jabal Usam (Arabic: جبل عصام) is a sub-district located in al-Saddah District, Ibb Governorate, Yemen. Jabal Usam had a population of 4814 according to the 2004 census.
