= Amqah =

Amqah عمقة
- Sub-district
- Location in Yemen
- Coordinates: 14°06′35″N 44°33′12″E
- Country: Yemen
- Governorate: Ibb Governorate
- District: An Nadirah District

Population (2004)
  - Total: 3,432
- Time zone: UTC+3

Amqah (Arabic: عمقة) is a sub-district located in al-Nadirah District, Ibb Governorate, Yemen. Amqah had a population of 3432 according to the 2004 census.
