= Kahlan (Ibb) =

Kahlan كحلان
- Sub-district
- Location in Yemen
- Coordinates: 14°15′49″N 44°29′58″E
- Country: Yemen
- Governorate: Ibb Governorate
- District: Ar Radmah District

Population (2004)
  - Total: 22,215
- Time zone: UTC+3

Kahlan (Arabic: كحلان) is a sub-district located in al-Radmah District, Ibb Governorate, Yemen. Kahlan had a population of 22,215 according to the 2004 census.
