= Nakhlan =

Nakhlan نخلان
- Sub-district
- Location in Yemen
- Coordinates: 13°50′06″N 44°09′39″E
- Country: Yemen
- Governorate: Ibb Governorate
- District: As Sayyani District

Population (2004)
  - Total: 11,203
- Time zone: UTC+3

Nakhlan (Arabic: نخلان) is a sub-district located in al-Sayyani District, Ibb Governorate, Yemen. Nakhlan had a population of 11203 according to the 2004 census.
