= Anamir Asfal =

Anamir Asfal أنامر أسفل
- Sub-district
- Location in Yemen
- Coordinates: 13°56′37″N 44°09′17″E
- Country: Yemen
- Governorate: Ibb Governorate
- District: Al Mashannah District

Population (2004)
  - Total: 8,820

Anamir Asfal (Arabic: أنامر أسفل) is a sub-district located in Al Mashannah District, Ibb Governorate, Yemen. Anamir Asfal had a population of 8820 as of 2004.
