= Al-Damgh =

Al-Damgh الدامغ
- Sub-district
- Location in Yemen
- Coordinates: 13°49′21″N 44°12′33″E
- Country: Yemen
- Governorate: Ibb Governorate
- District: As Sayyani District

Population (2004)
  - Total: 16,437
- Time zone: UTC+3

Al-Damgh (Arabic: الدامغ) is a sub-district located in al-Sayyani District, Ibb Governorate, Yemen. Al-Damgh had a population of 16437 according to the 2004 census.
