= Bani Sawi =

Bani Sawi بني ساوي
- Sub-district
- Location in Yemen
- Coordinates: 14°12′08″N 43°48′49″E
- Country: Yemen
- Governorate: Ibb Governorate
- District: Al Qafr District

Population (2004)
  - Total: 6,108
- Time zone: UTC+3

Bani Sawi (Arabic: بني ساوي) is a sub-district located in Al Qafr District, Ibb Governorate, Yemen. Bani Sawi had a population of 6108 as of 2004.
