= Bani Margham =

Bani Margham بني مرغم
- Sub-district
- Location in Yemen
- Coordinates: 14°12′18″N 44°06′54″E
- Country: Yemen
- Governorate: Ibb Governorate
- District: Al Qafr District

Population (2004)
  - Total: 2,855

Bani Margham (Arabic: بني مرغم) is a sub-district located in Al Qafr District, Ibb Governorate, Yemen. Bani Margham had a population of 2855 as of 2004.
