= Jaranah =

Jaranah جرانة
- Sub-district
- Location in Yemen
- Country: Yemen
- Governorate: Ibb Governorate
- District: Ba'dan District

Population (2004)
  - Total: 4,374
- Time zone: UTC+3

Jaranah (Arabic: جرانة) is a sub-district located in Ba'dan District, Ibb Governorate, Yemen. Jaranah had a population of 4374 as of 2004.
