= Bani Saif al-Alli =

Bani Saif al-Alli بني سيف العالي
- Sub-district
- Location in Yemen
- Coordinates: 14°16′11″N 44°12′16″E
- Country: Yemen
- Governorate: Ibb Governorate
- District: Al Qafr District

Population (2004)
  - Total: 6,875
- Time zone: UTC+3

Bani Saif al-Alli (Arabic: بني سيف العالي) is a sub-district located in Al Qafr District, Ibb Governorate, Yemen. Bani Saif al-Alli had a population of 6875 as of 2004.
