= Harth al-Haidari =

Harth al-Haidari حارث الحيدرى
- Sub-district
- Location in Yemen
- Coordinates: 14°10′46″N 44°38′22″E
- Country: Yemen
- Governorate: Ibb Governorate
- District: Ar Radmah District

Population (2004)
  - Total: 3,677
- Time zone: UTC+3

Harth al-Haidari (Arabic: حارث الحيدرى) is a sub-district located in al-Radmah District, Ibb Governorate, Yemen. Harth al-Haidari had a population of 3677 according to the 2004 census.
