= Wadi al-Maqab =

Wadi al-Maqab وادي المعقاب
- Sub-district
- Location in Yemen
- Country: Yemen
- Governorate: Ibb Governorate
- District: Hubaysh District

Population (2004)
  - Total: 4,863
- Time zone: UTC+3

Wadi al-Maqab (Arabic: وادي المعقاب) is a sub-district located in Hubaysh District, Ibb Governorate, Yemen. Wadi al-Maqab had a population of 4863 according to the 2004 census.
