= Bani Sirhah =

Bani Sirhah بني سرحة
- Sub-district
- Location in Yemen
- Coordinates: 14°11′55″N 44°11′34″E
- Country: Yemen
- Governorate: Ibb Governorate
- District: Al Makhadir District

Population (2004)
  - Total: 21,493
- Time zone: UTC+3

Bani Sirhah (Arabic: بني سرحة) is a sub-district located in Al Makhadir District, Ibb Governorate, Yemen. Bani Sirhah had a population of 21493 as of 2004.
