= Al-Maktab =

Al-Maktab المكتب
- Sub-district
- Location in Yemen
- Coordinates: 13°54′00″N 44°09′23″E
- Country: Yemen
- Governorate: Ibb Governorate
- District: Jiblah District

Population (2004)
  - Total: 16,176
- Time zone: UTC+3

Al-Maktab (Arabic: المكتب) is a sub-district located in Jiblah District, Ibb Governorate, Yemen. Al-Maktab had a population of 16,176 according to the 2004 census.
