= Hawr =

Hawr حور
- village
- Location in Yemen
- Coordinates: 13°57′16.0″N 43°52′20.3″E
- Country: Yemen
- Governorate: Ibb Governorate
- District: Al Udayn District

Population (2004)
  - Total: 2,518
- Time zone: UTC+3
- Geocode: 7355991

Hawr(Arabic: حور) is one of the villages of Uzlah Urdan, in Al Udayn District, which belongs to Ibb Governorate in Yemen. Its population was 2،518 according to the 2004 Yemen Census.
