= Blad al-Mulayki =

Blad al-Mulayki بلاد المليكي
- Sub-district
- Location in Yemen
- Coordinates: 13°55′22″N 43°56′24″E
- Country: Yemen
- Governorate: Ibb Governorate
- District: Al Udayn District

Population (2004)
  - Total: 10,193
- Time zone: UTC+3
- Geocode: 8735368

Blad al-Mulayki (Arabic: بلاد المليكي) is a sub-district located in Al Udayn District, Ibb Governorate, Yemen. Blad al-Mulayki had a population of 10,193 as of 2004.
