= Habyr =

Habyr حبير
- Sub-district
- Location in Yemen
- Country: Yemen
- Governorate: Ibb Governorate
- District: Dhi As Sufal District

Population (2004)
  - Total: 9,753
- Time zone: UTC+3

Habyr (Arabic: حبير) is a sub-district located in Dhi al-Sufal District, Ibb Governorate, Yemen. Habyr had a population of 9753 as of 2004.
