= Wadi Al-Habali =

Wadi Al-Habali وادي الحبالي
- Sub-district
- Location in Yemen
- Coordinates: 14°08′02″N 44°26′26″E
- Country: Yemen
- Governorate: Ibb Governorate
- District: As Saddah District

Population (2004)
  - Total: 4,964
- Time zone: UTC+3

Wadi Al-Habali (Arabic: وادي الحبالي) is a sub-district located in al-Saddah District, Ibb Governorate, Yemen. Wadi Al-Habali had a population of 4964 according to the 2004 census.
