= Al Maftah al-Alla =

Al Maftah al-Alla المفتاح الأعلى
- Sub-district
- Location in Yemen
- Coordinates: 14°05′04″N 44°27′29″E
- Country: Yemen
- Governorate: Ibb Governorate
- District: An Nadirah District

Population (2004)
  - Total: 6,329
- Time zone: UTC+3
- Geocode: 8735318

Al Maftah al-Alla (Arabic: المفتاح الأعلى) is a sub-district located in al-Nadirah District, Ibb Governorate, Yemen. Al Maftah al-Alla had a population of 6329 according to the 2004 census.
