= Al Zamazimah =

Al Zamazimah الزمازمة
- Sub-district
- Location in Yemen
- Coordinates: 14°04′41″N 44°29′28″E
- Country: Yemen
- Governorate: Ibb Governorate
- District: An Nadirah District

Population (2004)
  - Total: 3,186
- Time zone: UTC+3
- Geocode: 8735312

Al Zamazimah (Arabic: الزمازمة) is a sub-district located in al-Nadirah District, Ibb Governorate, Yemen. Al Zamazimah had a population of 3186 according to the 2004 census.
