= Hazah (Ibb) =

Hazah حزة
- Sub-district
- Location in Yemen
- Coordinates: 13°51′13″N 44°00′32″E
- Country: Yemen
- Governorate: Ibb Governorate
- District: Mudhaykhirah District

Population (2004)
  - Total: 1,264
- Time zone: UTC+3

Hazah (Arabic: حزة) is a sub-district located in Mudhaykhirah District, Ibb Governorate, Yemen. Hazah had a population of 1264 according to the 2004 census.
