= Malik (Ibb) =

Malik مالك
- Sub-district
- Location in Yemen
- Coordinates: 14°06′05″N 44°30′12″E
- Country: Yemen
- Governorate: Ibb Governorate
- District: An Nadirah District

Population (2004)
  - Total: 5,118
- Time zone: UTC+3
- Geocode: 8735319

Malik (Arabic: مالك) is a sub-district located in al-Nadirah District, Ibb Governorate, Yemen. Malik had a population of 5118 according to the 2004 census.
