= Al-Markham =

Al-Markham المرخام
- Sub-district
- Location in Yemen
- Coordinates: 14°08′44″N 44°21′46″E
- Country: Yemen
- Governorate: Ibb Governorate
- District: As Saddah District

Population (2004)
  - Total: 3,802
- Time zone: UTC+3

Al-Markham (Arabic: المرخام) is a sub-district located in al-Saddah District, Ibb Governorate, Yemen. Al-Markham had a population of 3802 according to the 2004 census.
