= Al-Majahidah =

Al-Majahidah المجاهدة
- Sub-district
- Location in Yemen
- Coordinates: 14°9′17.57″N 43°51′51.70″E
- Country: Yemen
- Governorate: Ibb Governorate
- District: Hazm al-'Udayn District

Population (2004)
  - Total: 1,451
- Time zone: UTC+3

Al-Majahidah (Arabic: المجاهدة) is a sub-district located in Hazm al-'Udayn District, Ibb Governorate, Yemen. Al-Majahidah had a population of 1451 according to the 2004 census.
