= Al-Thawabi =

Al-Thawabi الثوابي
- Sub-district
- Location in Yemen
- Coordinates: 13°52′29″N 44°05′16″E
- Country: Yemen
- Governorate: Ibb Governorate
- District: Jiblah District

Population (2004)
  - Total: 10,714
- Time zone: UTC+3

Al-Thawabi (Arabic: الثوابي) is a sub-district located in Jiblah District, Ibb Governorate, Yemen. Al-Thawabi had a population of 10,714 according to the 2004 census.
