= Shaba' =

Shaba' شباع
- Sub-district
- Location in Yemen
- Country: Yemen
- Governorate: Ibb Governorate
- District: Hubaysh District

Population (2004)
  - Total: 5,053
- Time zone: UTC+3

Shaba' (Arabic: شباع) is a sub-district located in Hubaysh District, Ibb Governorate, Yemen. Shaba' had a population of 5053 according to the 2004 census.
