= Al-Adharib =

Al-Adharib العذارب
- Sub-district
- Location in Yemen
- Coordinates: 13°55′00″N 44°25′43″E
- Country: Yemen
- Governorate: Ibb Governorate
- District: Ba'dan District

Population (2004)
  - Total: 5,257
- Time zone: UTC+3

Al-Adharib (Arabic: العذارب) is a sub-district located in Ba'dan District, Ibb Governorate, Yemen. Al-Adharib had a population of 5257 as of 2004.
