= Al-Mashiraq =

Al-Mashiraq المشيرق
- Sub-district
- Location in Yemen
- Coordinates: 14°08′00″N 44°08′39″E
- Country: Yemen
- Governorate: Ibb Governorate
- District: Hubaysh District

Population (2004)
  - Total: 4,749
- Time zone: UTC+3

Al-Mashiraq (Arabic: المشيرق) is a sub-district located in Hubaysh District, Ibb Governorate, Yemen. Al-Mashiraq had a population of 4749 according to the 2004 census.
