= Al-Naqilayn =

Al-Naqilayn النقيلين
- Sub-district
- Location in Yemen
- Coordinates: 13°51′33″N 44°08′58″E
- Country: Yemen
- Governorate: Ibb Governorate
- District: As Sayyani District

Population (2004)
  - Total: 12,526
- Time zone: UTC+3

Al-Naqilayn (Arabic: النقيلين) is a sub-district located in al-Sayyani District, Ibb Governorate, Yemen. Al-Naqilayn had a population of 12526 according to the 2004 census.
