= Al Fajrah =

Al Fajrah الفجرة
- Sub-district
- Location in Yemen
- Coordinates: 14°02′41″N 44°28′13″E
- Country: Yemen
- Governorate: Ibb Governorate
- District: An Nadirah District

Population (2004)
  - Total: 8,110
- Time zone: UTC+3
- Geocode: 8735313

Al Fajrah (Arabic: الفجرة) is a sub-district located in al-Nadirah District, Ibb Governorate, Yemen. Al Fajrah had a population of 8110 according to the 2004 census.
