= Bani Awadh =

Bani Awadh may refer to:

- Bani Awadh (Al Udayn), a sub-district in Al Udayn District, Ibb Governorate, Yemen
- Bani Awadh (Ba'dan), a sub-district in Ba'dan District, Ibb Governorate, Yemen
