= Arwan =

Arwan عروان
- Sub-district
- Location in Yemen
- Coordinates: 13°57′41″N 44°17′22″E
- Country: Yemen
- Governorate: Ibb Governorate
- District: As Sabrah District

Population (2004)
  - Total: 5,531
- Time zone: UTC+3

Arwan (Arabic: عروان) is a sub-district located in al-Sabrah District, Ibb Governorate, Yemen. Arwan had a population of 5,531 according to the 2004 census.
