= Naqil al-Aqab =

Coordinates: 14°01′22″N 44°03′38″E

Naqil al-Aqab نقيل العقاب
- Sub-district
- Location in Yemen
- Country: Yemen
- Governorate: Ibb Governorate
- District: Hubaysh District

Population (2004)
  - Total: 4,683
- Time zone: UTC+3

Naqil al-Aqab (Arabic: نقيل العقاب) is a sub-district located in Hubaysh District, Ibb Governorate, Yemen. Naqil al-Aqab had a population of 4683 according to the 2004 census.
