= Al Sharnimah al-Allia =

Al Sharnamah al-Allia الشرنمه العليا
- Sub-district
- Location in Yemen
- Coordinates: 13°59′26″N 44°28′49″E
- Country: Yemen
- Governorate: Ibb Governorate
- District: An Nadirah District

Population (2004)
  - Total: 8,800
- Time zone: UTC+3
- Geocode: 8735314

Al Sharnamah al-Allia (Arabic: الشرنمه العليا) is a sub-district located in al-Nadirah District, Ibb Governorate, Yemen. Al Sharnamah al-Allia had a population of 8800 according to the 2004 census.
