= Al-Sidam =

Al-Sidam السيدم
- Sub-district
- Location in Yemen
- Coordinates: 14.12761°N 43.99679°E
- Country: Yemen
- Governorate: Ibb Governorate
- District: Hazm al-'Udayn District

Population (2004)
  - Total: 2,102
- Time zone: UTC+3

Al-Sidam (Arabic: السيدم) is a sub-district located in Hazm al-'Udayn District, Ibb Governorate, Yemen. Al-Sidam had a population of 2,102 according to the 2004 census.
