= Al-Qabl al-Asfl =

Al-Qabl al-Asfl القابل الاسفل
- Sub-district
- Location in Yemen
- Coordinates: 14°01′55″N 44°21′16″E
- Country: Yemen
- Governorate: Ibb Governorate
- District: Ash Sha'ar District

Population (2004)
  - Total: 4,360
- Time zone: UTC+3

Al-Qabl al-Asfl (Arabic: القابل الاسفل) is a sub-district located in al-Sha'ar District, Ibb Governorate, Yemen. Al-Qabl al-Asfl had a population of 4360 according to the 2004 census.
