= Bani Juma'ah =

Bani Juma'ah بني جماعة
- Sub-district
- Location in Yemen
- Coordinates: 14°21′27″N 43°59′58″E
- Country: Yemen
- Governorate: Ibb Governorate
- District: Al Qafr District

Population (2004)
  - Total: 5,585
- Time zone: UTC+3

Bani Juma'ah (Arabic: بني جماعة) is a sub-district located in Al Qafr District, Ibb Governorate, Yemen. Bani Juma'ah had a population of 5585 as of 2004.
