= Urdan (Ibb) =

Ardan عردن
- Sub-district
- Location in Yemen
- Coordinates: 13°55′59″N 43°53′01″E
- Country: Yemen
- Governorate: Ibb Governorate
- District: Al Udayn District

Population (2004)
  - Total: 14,171
- Time zone: UTC+3
- Geocode: 8735365

Ardan (Arabic: عردن) is a sub-district located in Al Udayn District, Ibb Governorate, Yemen, with a population of 14171 as of 2004.

== villages of Urdan ==
There are 6 villages in Urdan.

- Sharqi Urdan
- Al-Maabar
- Hawr
- Al-Hasaabin
- Rumada
- Al-Zirah
