= Al-Jirdami =

Al-Jirdami (Arabic: الجردامي), is a Mahallah (Country subdivision) located in Hazm Al Udayn District, Ibb Governorate, Yemen. According to the 2004 Yemen Census, the population of the village was 53.

As of 2014, the population of the Mahallah reached 71.
