= Al-Amarinah =

Al-Amarinah العمارنة
- Sub-district
- Location in Yemen
- Coordinates: 13°51′50″N 43°52′46″E
- Country: Yemen
- Governorate: Ibb Governorate
- District: Al Udayn District

Population (2004)
  - Total: 3,201
- Time zone: UTC+3
- Geocode: 8735380

Al-Amarinah (Arabic: العمارنة) is a sub-district located in Al Udayn District, Ibb Governorate, Yemen. Al-Amarinah had a population of 3201 as of 2004.
