= Al-Ghudhaybah =

Al-Ghudhaybah الغضيبة
- Sub-district
- Location in Yemen
- Coordinates: 13°59′01″N 44°01′33″E
- Country: Yemen
- Governorate: Ibb Governorate
- District: Al Udayn District

Population (2004)
  - Total: 6,169
- Time zone: UTC+3
- Geocode: 8735362

Al-Ghudhaybah (Arabic: الغضيبة) is a sub-district located in Al Udayn District, Ibb Governorate, Yemen. Al-Ghudhaybah had a population of 6169 as of 2004.
