= Bani Amran =

Bani Amran بني عمران
- Sub-district
- Location in Yemen
- Coordinates: 14°05′55″N 43°54′03″E
- Country: Yemen
- Governorate: Ibb Governorate
- District: Al Udayn District

Population (2004)
  - Total: 2,600
- Time zone: UTC+3
- Geocode: 8735372

Bani Amran (Arabic: بني عمران) is a sub-district located in Al Udayn District, Ibb Governorate, Yemen. Bani Amran had a population of 2600 as of 2004.
