= Sharf Hatim =

Sharf Hatim شرف حاتم
- Sub-district
- Location in Yemen
- Coordinates: 13°57′57″N 44°02′56″E
- Country: Yemen
- Governorate: Ibb Governorate
- District: Al Udayn District

Population (2004)
  - Total: 1,431
- Time zone: UTC+3
- Geocode: 8735376

Sharf Hatim (Arabic: شرف حاتم) is a sub-district located in Al Udayn District, Ibb Governorate, Yemen. Sharf Hatim had a population of 1,431 as of 2004.
