= Shalf =

Shalf شلف
- Sub-district
- Location in Yemen
- Coordinates: 13°52′53″N 43°52′45″E
- Country: Yemen
- Governorate: Ibb Governorate
- District: Al Udayn District

Population (2004)
  - Total: 3,681
- Time zone: UTC+3
- Geocode: 8735373

Shalf (Arabic: شلف) is a sub-district located in Al Udayn District, Ibb Governorate, Yemen. Shalf had a population of 3681 as of 2004.
