= Al-Wadi =

Al-Wadi الوادي
- Sub-district
- Location in Yemen
- Coordinates: 13°59′56″N 44°02′42″E
- Country: Yemen
- Governorate: Ibb Governorate
- District: Al Udayn District

Population (2004)
  - Total: 4,343
- Time zone: UTC+3

Al-Wadi (Arabic: الوادي) is a sub-district located in Al Udayn District, Ibb Governorate, Yemen. Al-Wadi had a population of 4343 as of 2004.
