= Jabal Baʽdan =

Coordinates: 15°47′N 44°05′E

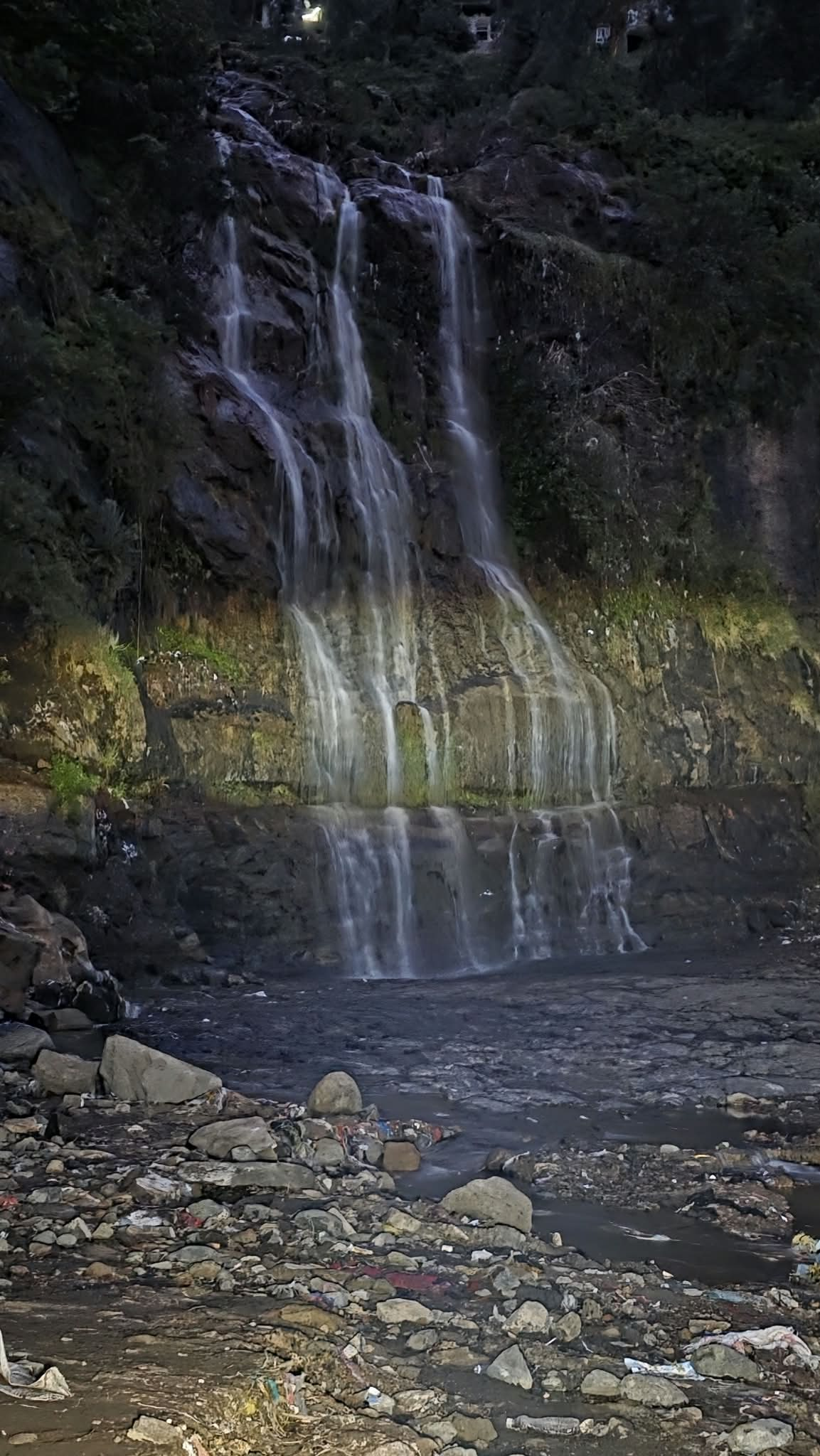

Naming
- Native name: جبل بعدان (in Arabic)

Geography
- Location within Yemen
- Location: Ibb Governorate, Yemen

Jabal Baʽdan (Arabic: جبل بعدان, romanized: Jabal Baʽdân), also known as Mount Baʽdan or Baʽadan (Arabic: بعدان, romanized: Baʽdân), is a mountain in western central Yemen with an altitude over 2.8 km, it is one of the highest mountains in Yemen. It is located in the Ba'adan District, Ibb Governorate and borders Ibb city from the East. Ba'adan is famous with its green sceneries, and contains several cultural and tourist locations such as The Castle of Hab.
