= Jabal Bahri =

Jabal Bahri جبل بحري
- Sub-district
- Location in Yemen
- Coordinates: 13°59′10″N 43°57′19″E
- Country: Yemen
- Governorate: Ibb Governorate
- District: Al Udayn District

Population (2004)
  - Total: 6,062
- Time zone: UTC+3
- Geocode: 8735369

Jabal Bahri (Arabic: جبل بحري) is a sub-district located in Al Udayn District, Ibb Governorate, Yemen. Jabal Bahri had a population of 6062 as of 2004.
