= Bani Awadh (Ba'dan) =

Bani Awadh بني عواض
- Sub-district
- Location in Yemen
- Coordinates: 13°59′12″N 44°22′58″E
- Country: Yemen
- Governorate: Ibb Governorate
- District: Ba'dan District

Population (2004)
  - Total: 6,944
- Time zone: UTC+3

Bani Awadh (Arabic: بني عواض) is a sub-district located in Ba'dan District, Ibb Governorate, Yemen. Bani Awadh had a population of 6944 as of 2004.
