= Al-Sarah =

Al-Sarah السارة
- Sub-district
- Location in Yemen
- Coordinates: 13°53′21″N 43°54′24″E
- Country: Yemen
- Governorate: Ibb Governorate
- District: Al Udayn District

Population (2004)
  - Total: 18,808
- Time zone: UTC+3
- Geocode: 8735383

Al-Sarah (Arabic: السارة) is a sub-district located in Al Udayn District, Ibb Governorate, Yemen. Al-Sarah had a population of 18,808 as of 2004.
