= Ghaber =

Ghaber غابر
- Sub-district
- Location in Yemen
- Coordinates: 13°59′32″N 43°55′00″E
- Country: Yemen
- Governorate: Ibb Governorate
- District: Al Udayn District

Population (2004)
  - Total: 595
- Time zone: UTC+3
- Geocode: 8735371

Ghaber (Arabic: غابر) is a sub-district located in Al Udayn District, Ibb Governorate, Yemen. Ghaber had a population of 595 as of 2004.
