= Bani Hat =

Bani Hat بني هات
- Sub-district
- Location in Yemen
- Coordinates: 13°58′48″N 43°59′39″E
- Country: Yemen
- Governorate: Ibb Governorate
- District: Al Udayn District

Population (2004)
  - Total: 13,754
- Time zone: UTC+3
- Geocode: 8735363

Bani Hat (Arabic: بني هات) is a sub-district located in Al Udayn District, Ibb Governorate, Yemen. Bani Hat had a population of 6169 as of 2004.
