= Bani Malik (Ibb) =

Bani Malik بني مليك
- Sub-district
- Location in Yemen
- Coordinates: 13°53′14″N 43°56′19″E
- Country: Yemen
- Governorate: Ibb Governorate
- District: Al Udayn District

Population (2004)
  - Total: 5,135
- Time zone: UTC+3

Bani Malik (Arabic: بني مليك) is a sub-district located in Al Udayn district, Ibb Governorate, Yemen. Bani Malik had a population of 5,135 according to the 2004 census.
