= Bani Abdullah =

Bani Abdullah بني عبد الله
- Sub-district
- Location in Yemen
- Coordinates: 13°50′58″N 44°02′27″E
- Country: Yemen
- Governorate: Ibb Governorate
- District: Al Udayn District

Population (2004)
  - Total: 5,021
- Time zone: UTC+3
- Geocode: 8735456

Bani Abdullah (Arabic: بني عبد الله) is a sub-district located in Al Udayn District, Ibb Governorate, Yemen. Bani Abdullah had a population of 5021 as of 2004.
