= Qasel =

Qasel قصل
- Sub-district
- Location in Yemen
- Coordinates: 14°00′42″N 43°52′25″E
- Country: Yemen
- Governorate: Ibb Governorate
- District: Al Udayn District

Population (2004)
  - Total: 3,687
- Time zone: UTC+3
- Geocode: 8735378

Qasel (Arabic: قصل) is a sub-district located in Al Udayn District, Ibb Governorate, Yemen. Qasel had a population of 3687 as of 2004.
