= Kroaldakhn (Hazm Al-Udayn) =

Village in the Ibb Governorate, Yemen

Kroaldakhn is a village in Hazm Al Udayn District in the Ibb Governorate in Yemen. According to the census that was done by the government in Yemen in 2004, the village has a population of 28 residents.
