= Bani Zahir =

Bani Zahir بني زهير
- Sub-district
- Location in Yemen
- Coordinates: 13°57′21″N 43°55′42″E
- Country: Yemen
- Governorate: Ibb Governorate
- District: Al Udayn District

Population (2004)
  - Total: 5,281
- Time zone: UTC+3
- Geocode: 8735370

Bani Zahir (Arabic: بني زهير) is a sub-district located in Al Udayn District, Ibb Governorate, Yemen. Bani Zahir had a population of 5281 as of 2004.
