= Sanid al-Sharqi =

Sanid al-Sharqi صنيد الشرقي
- Sub-district
- Location in Yemen
- Coordinates: 13°58′09″N 44°02′19″E
- Country: Yemen
- Governorate: Ibb Governorate
- District: Al Udayn District

Population (2004)
  - Total: 1,296
- Time zone: UTC+3
- Geocode: 8735364

Sanid al-Sharqi (Arabic: صنيد الشرقي) is a sub-district located in Al Udayn District, Ibb Governorate, Yemen. Sanid al-Sharqi had a population of 6169 as of 2004.
