= Al-Radhai =

Al-Radhai الرضائى
- Sub-district
- Location in Yemen
- Coordinates: 13°58′49″N 44°03′08″E
- Country: Yemen
- Governorate: Ibb Governorate
- District: Al Udayn District

Population (2004)
  - Total: 2,491
- Time zone: UTC+3
- Geocode: 8735366

Al-Radhai (Arabic: الرضائى) is a sub-district located in Al Udayn District, Ibb Governorate, Yemen. Al-Radhai had a population of 2491 as of 2004.
