= Al-Jabalyn =

Al-Jabalyn الجبلين
- Sub-district
- Location in Yemen
- Coordinates: 14°06′18″N 44°03′59″E
- Country: Yemen
- Governorate: Ibb Governorate
- District: Al Udayn District

Population (2004)
  - Total: 11,882
- Time zone: UTC+3
- Geocode: 8735374

Al-Jabalyn (Arabic: الجبلين) is a sub-district located in Al Udayn District, Ibb Governorate, Yemen. Al-Jabalyn had a population of 11,882 as of 2004.
