= Qasa' Haliyan =

Qasa' Haliyan قصع حليان
- Sub-district
- Location in Yemen
- Coordinates: 13°55′49″N 43°58′54″E
- Country: Yemen
- Governorate: Ibb Governorate
- District: Al Udayn District

Population (2004)
  - Total: 9,118
- Time zone: UTC+3
- Geocode: 8735382

Qasa' Haliyan (Arabic: قصع حليان) is a sub-district located in Al Udayn District, Ibb Governorate, Yemen. Qasa' Haliyan had a population of 9118 as of 2004.
