= Khabaz =

Khabaz خباز
- Sub-district
- Location in Yemen
- Coordinates: 13°56′38″N 44°01′38″E
- Country: Yemen
- Governorate: Ibb Governorate
- District: Al Udayn District

Population (2004)
  - Total: 7,711
- Time zone: UTC+3
- Geocode: 8735381

Khabaz (Arabic: خباز) is a sub-district located in Al Udayn District, Ibb Governorate, Yemen. Khabaz had a population of 7711 as of 2004.
