= Al-Wahs =

Al-Wahs الوحص
- Sub-district
- Location in Yemen
- Coordinates: 13°49′30″N 44°04′51″E
- Country: Yemen
- Governorate: Ibb Governorate
- District: Dhi As Sufal District

Population (2004)
  - Total: 3,072
- Time zone: UTC+3

Al-Wahs (Arabic: الوحص) is a sub-district located in Dhi al-Sufal District, Ibb Governorate, Yemen. Al-Wahs had a population of 3072 as of 2004.
