= Al-Mahrur (Hazm Al Udayn) =

Village in Ibb Governorate, Yemen

Al-Mahrur is a village in the Hazm Al Udayn District in the Ibb Governorate, Yemen. There are 1029 residents in the village.
