= Bani Awadh (Al Udayn) =

Bani Awadh بني عوض
- Sub-district
- Location in Yemen
- Coordinates: 14°01′02″N 44°01′03″E
- Country: Yemen
- Governorate: Ibb Governorate
- District: Al Udayn District

Population (2004)
  - Total: 5,797

Bani Awadh (Arabic: بني عوض) is a sub-district located in Al Udayn District, Ibb Governorate, Yemen. Bani Awadh had a population of 5,797 as of 2004.
