= Ibb district =

Ibb District مُدِيْرِيَّة إِبّ
- District
- Location in Yemen
- Coordinates: 14°01′59″N 44°09′18″E
- Country: Yemen
- Governorate: Ibb

Population (2003)
  - Total: 143,641
- Time zone: UTC+3 (Yemen Standard Time)

Ibb District (Arabic: مُدِيْرِيَّة إِبّ) is a district of the Ibb Governorate, Yemen. As of 2003, the district had a population of 143,641 inhabitants.
