= Al Mashannah district =

Al Mashannah District مديرية المشنة
- District
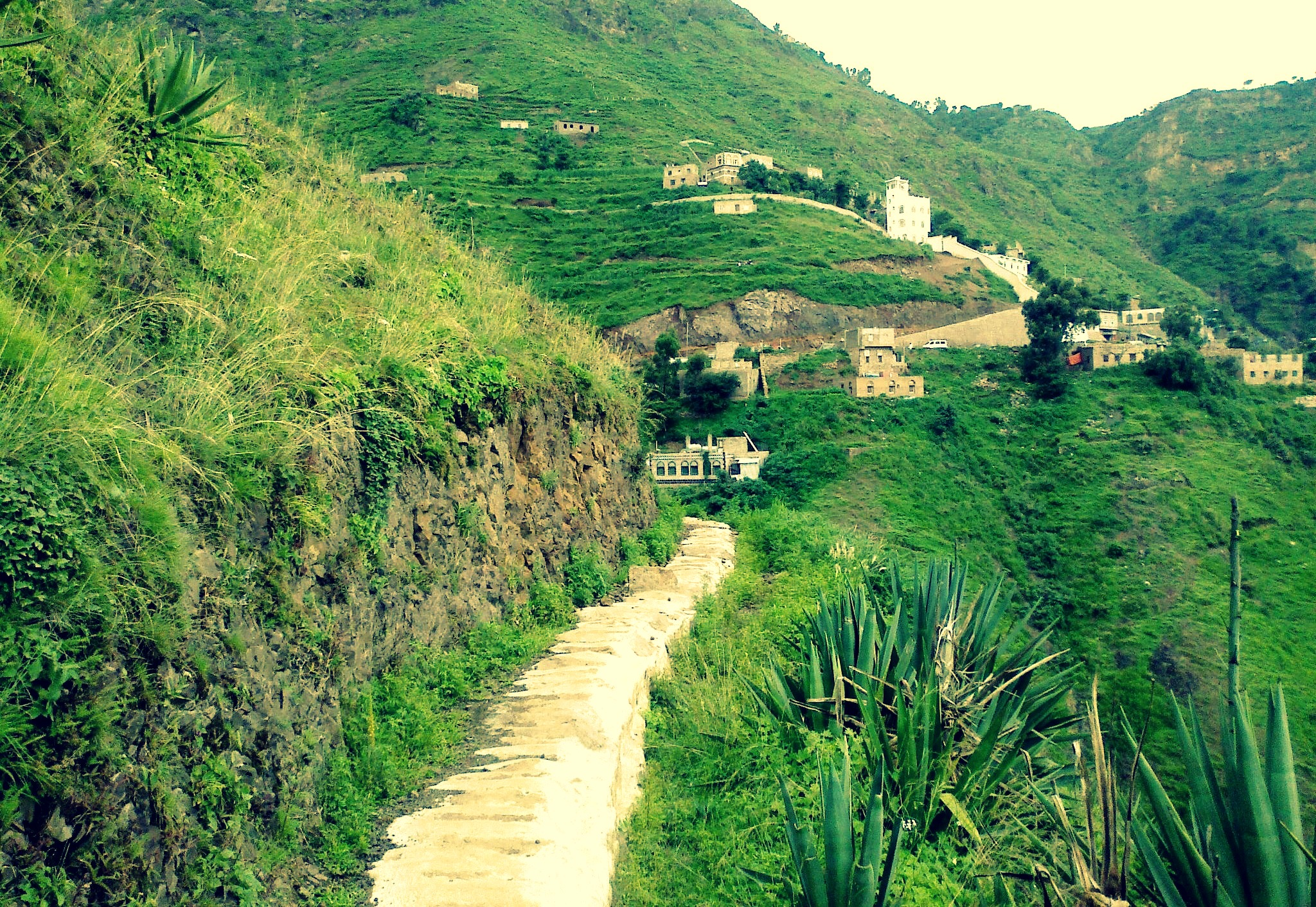
- Road to al Mashannah

- Location in Yemen
- Coordinates: 13.9572°N 44.1700°E
- Country: Yemen
- Governorate: Ibb

Population (2003)
  - Total: 101,148
- Time zone: UTC+3 (Yemen Standard Time)

Al Mashannah District (Arabic: مديرية المشنة, romanized: ālmšnh) is a district of the Ibb Governorate, Yemen. As of 2003, the district had a population of 101,148 inhabitants.

== Uzal of Al Mashannah ==
There are 3 ‘Uzal (sub-districts) in Al Mashannah.

- Al-huj Al-‘Uodani
- Anamr 'Asfal
- Al-Mashannah
