= Al Dhihar district =

- District
- Location in Yemen
- Coordinates: 13.9789°N 44.1525°E
- Country: Yemen
- Governorate: Ibb

Population (2003)
  - Total: 154,399
- Time zone: UTC+3 (Yemen Standard Time)

Al Dhihar district (Arabic: مديرية الظهار) is a district of the Ibb Governorate, Yemen. As of 2003, the district had a population of 154,399 inhabitants.
