= Far Al Udayn district =

Far Al Udayn District
- District
- Location in Yemen
- Coordinates: 13°57′29″N 43°46′59″E
- Country: Yemen
- Governorate: Ibb

Population (2003)
  - Total: 89,011
- Time zone: UTC+3 (Yemen Standard Time)

Far Al Udayn District (Arabic: مديرية فرع العُدين) is a district of the Ibb Governorate, Yemen. As of 2003, the district had a population of 89,011 inhabitants.
