= Ar Radmah district =

Coordinates: 14.2119°N 44.5642°E

Ar Radmah District
- District
- Interactive map of Ar Radmah District
- Country: Yemen
- Governorate: Ibb

Population (2003)
  - Total: 76,576
- Time zone: UTC+3 (Yemen Standard Time)

Ar Radmah District (Arabic: مديرية الرضمة) is a district of the Ibb Governorate, Yemen. As of 2003, the district had a population of 76,576 inhabitants.
