= Ash Sha'ar district =

Coordinates: 14.0317°N 44.3617°E

Ash Sha'ir District مديرية الشَعر
- District
- Interactive map of Ash Sha'ir District
- Country: Yemen
- Governorate: Ibb

Population (2003)
  - Total: 39,805
- Time zone: UTC+3 (Yemen Standard Time)

Ash Sha'ir District (Arabic: مديرية الشَعر) is a district of the Ibb Governorate, Yemen. As of 2003, the district had a population of 39,805 inhabitants.
