= Al Makhadir district =

Al Makhadir District
- District
- Location in Yemen
- Coordinates: 14.1394°N 44.2031°E
- Country: Yemen
- Governorate: Ibb

Population (2003)
  - Total: 113,892
- Time zone: UTC+3 (Yemen Standard Time)

Al Makhadir District (Arabic: مديرية المخادر) is a district of Ibb Governorate, Yemen. As of 2003, the district had a population of 113,892 inhabitants.
