= Ba'dan district =

Ba'dan District بعدان
- District
- Location in Yemen
- Coordinates: 13°59′20″N 44°19′23″E
- Country: Yemen
- Governorate: Ibb

Population (2003)
  - Total: 116,045
- Time zone: UTC+3 (Yemen Standard Time)

Ba'dan District (Arabic: مديرية بعدان) is a district of the Ibb Governorate, Yemen. As of 2003, the district had a population of 116,045 inhabitants.

== See also ==
- Baʽadan mountain
