= Jiblah district =

Jiblah District مُدِيْرِيَّة جِبْلَة
- District
- Location in Yemen
- Coordinates: 13°54′54″N 44°07′16″E
- Country: Yemen
- Governorate: Ibb

Population (2003)
  - Total: 112,481
- Time zone: UTC+3 (Yemen Standard Time)

Jiblah District (Arabic: مُدِيْرِيَّة جِبْلَة) is a district of the Ibb Governorate, Yemen. As of 2003, the district had a population of 112,481 inhabitants.
