= Al Udayn district =

Coordinates: 13.9611°N 43.9658°E

Al Udayn District
- District
- Interactive map of Al Udayn District
- Country: Yemen
- Governorate: Ibb

Population (2003)
  - Total: 143,578
- Time zone: UTC+3 (Yemen Standard Time)

Al Udayn District (Arabic: مديرية العُدين, romanized: ālʿdyn) is a district of the Ibb Governorate, Yemen. As of 2003, the district had a population of 143,578 inhabitants.

The Mocha coffee from this district was highly prized, and called Uden.

== Uzal of Al-Udayn ==
There are 22 Uzal in Al-Udayn.

- Bani Awad
- Al-Ghudhaybah
- Bani Hat
- Sanid al-Sharqi
- Urdun
- Al-radhayai
- Al-wadi
- Bani Malik
- Jabal Bahri
- Bani Zahir
- Ghabir
- Bani ‘Amran
- Shalf
- Al-jabalin
- Sharaf Hatim
- Qdaaz
- Qasel
- Bani Abdullah
- Al-Amarinah
- Khabaz
- Qasaa Halyan
- Al-sarah
- Hoqain
