= Yarim district =

Yarim District مديرية يريم
- District
- Location in Yemen
- Coordinates: 14°15′14″N 44°18′43″E
- Country: Yemen
- Governorate: Ibb

Population (2003)
  - Total: 175,014
- Time zone: UTC+3 (Yemen Standard Time)

Yarim District (Arabic: مديرية يريم) is a district of the Ibb Governorate, Yemen. As of 2003, the district had a population of 175,014 inhabitants.

== Uzal (sub-districts) of Yarim ==
There are 11 ʽUzal (sub-districts) in Yarim.

- Yarim
- Khaw
- Raʽin
- ʽUbaydah
- ʽOras
- Bani Omar
- bani Saba'
- Bani Muslim
- Khudan
- Bani Munabah
- Aryab
