= As Sayyani district =

Coordinates: 13.8222°N 44.2117°E

As Sayyani District
- District
- Interactive map of As Sayyani District
- Country: Yemen
- Governorate: Ibb

Population (2003)
  - Total: 110,515
- Time zone: UTC+3 (Yemen Standard Time)

As Sayyani District (Arabic: مديرية السياني) is a district of the Ibb Governorate, Yemen. As of 2003, the district had a population of 110,515 inhabitants.
