= Mudhaykhirah district =

Mudhaykhirah District
- District
- Location in Yemen
- Coordinates: 13°51′58″N 43°58′08″E
- Country: Yemen
- Governorate: Ibb

Population (2003)
  - Total: 77,835
- Time zone: UTC+3 (Yemen Standard Time)

Mudhaykhirah District (Arabic: مديرية مذيخرة) is a district of the Ibb Governorate, Yemen. In 2003, the district had a population of 77,835.
