= As Sabrah district =

Coordinates: 13.8425°N 44.3383°E

As Sabrah District
- District
- Interactive map of As Sabrah District
- Country: Yemen
- Governorate: Ibb

Population (2003)
  - Total: 69,872
- Time zone: UTC+3 (Yemen Standard Time)

As Sabrah District (Arabic: مديرية السبرة) is a district of the Ibb Governorate, Yemen. As of 2003, the district had a population of 69,872 inhabitants.
