= As Saddah district =

Coordinates: 14.1658°N 44.3750°E

As Saddah District مديرية السدة
- District
- Interactive map of As Saddah District
- Country: Yemen
- Governorate: Ibb

Population (2003)
  - Total: 82,502
- Time zone: UTC+3 (Yemen Standard Time)

As Saddah District (Arabic: مديرية السدة, romanized: ālsdh) is a district of the Ibb Governorate, Yemen. As of 2003, the district had a population of 82,502 inhabitants.
