= An Nadirah district =

Coordinates: 14.0739°N 44.4992°E

An Nadirah District
- District
- Interactive map of An Nadirah District
- Country: Yemen
- Governorate: Ibb

Population (2003)
  - Total: 73,755
- Time zone: UTC+3 (Yemen Standard Time)

An Nadirah District (Arabic: مديرية النادرة) is a district of the Ibb Governorate, Yemen. As of 2003, the district had a population of 73,755 inhabitants.
