= Al Qafr district =

Al Qafr District
- District
- Location in Yemen
- Coordinates: 14.3128°N 44.0300°E
- Country: Yemen
- Governorate: Ibb

Population (2003)
  - Total: 103,272
- Time zone: UTC+3 (Yemen Standard Time)

Al Qafr District (Arabic: مديرية القفر) is a district of the Ibb Governorate, Yemen. As of 2003, the district had a population of 103,272 inhabitants.
