= Dhi As Sufal district =

Dhi As Sufal District
- District
- Location in Yemen
- Coordinates: 13°49′16″N 44°04′41″E
- Country: Yemen
- Governorate: Ibb

Population (2003)
  - Total: 163,019
- Time zone: UTC+3 (Yemen Standard Time)

Dhi As Sufal District (Arabic: مديرية ذي السفال) is a district of the Ibb Governorate, Yemen. As of 2003, the district had a population of 163,019 inhabitants.

== Sub-Districts ==
Al-Wahs (Arabic: الوحص) Al-Wahs had a population of 3072 as of 2004. [Ref 7 is a dead link]
