= Hazm al-'Udayn district =

Hazm Al Udayn District حزم العدين
- District
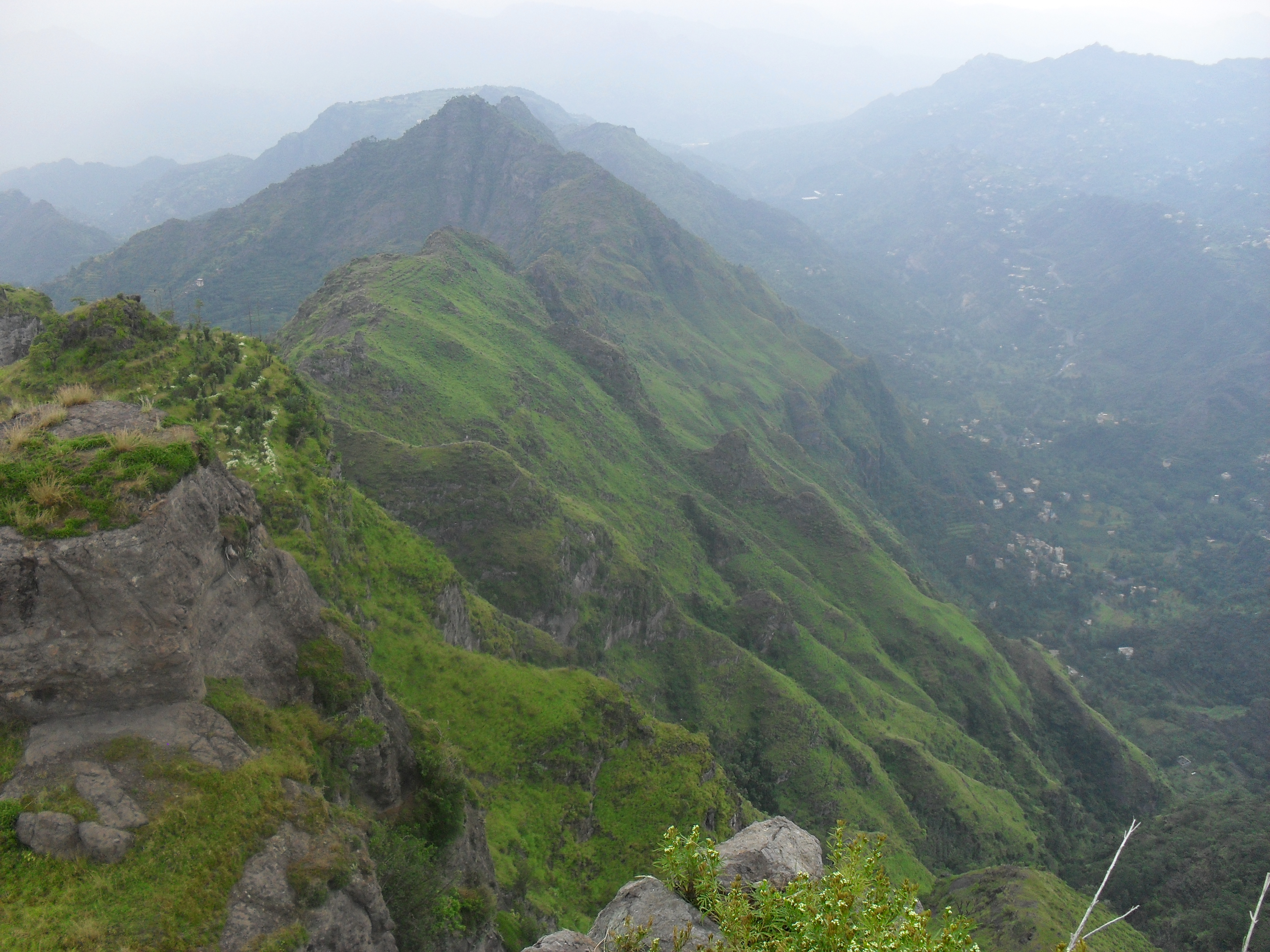
- Bani Awad mountains in Hazm Al-Udayn

- Location in Yemen
- Coordinates: 14°10′12″N 43°56′17″E
- Country: Yemen
- Governorate: Ibb

Population (2003)
  - Total: 79,483
- Time zone: UTC+3 (Yemen Standard Time)

Hazm al-ʿUdayn District (Arabic: حزم العدين) is a district of the Ibb Governorate, Yemen. As of 2003, the district had a population of 79,483 inhabitants.

Villages include Al-Mahrur, Kroaldakhn and Al-Jirdami.
