= Hubaysh district =

Hubaysh District مديرية حبيش
- District
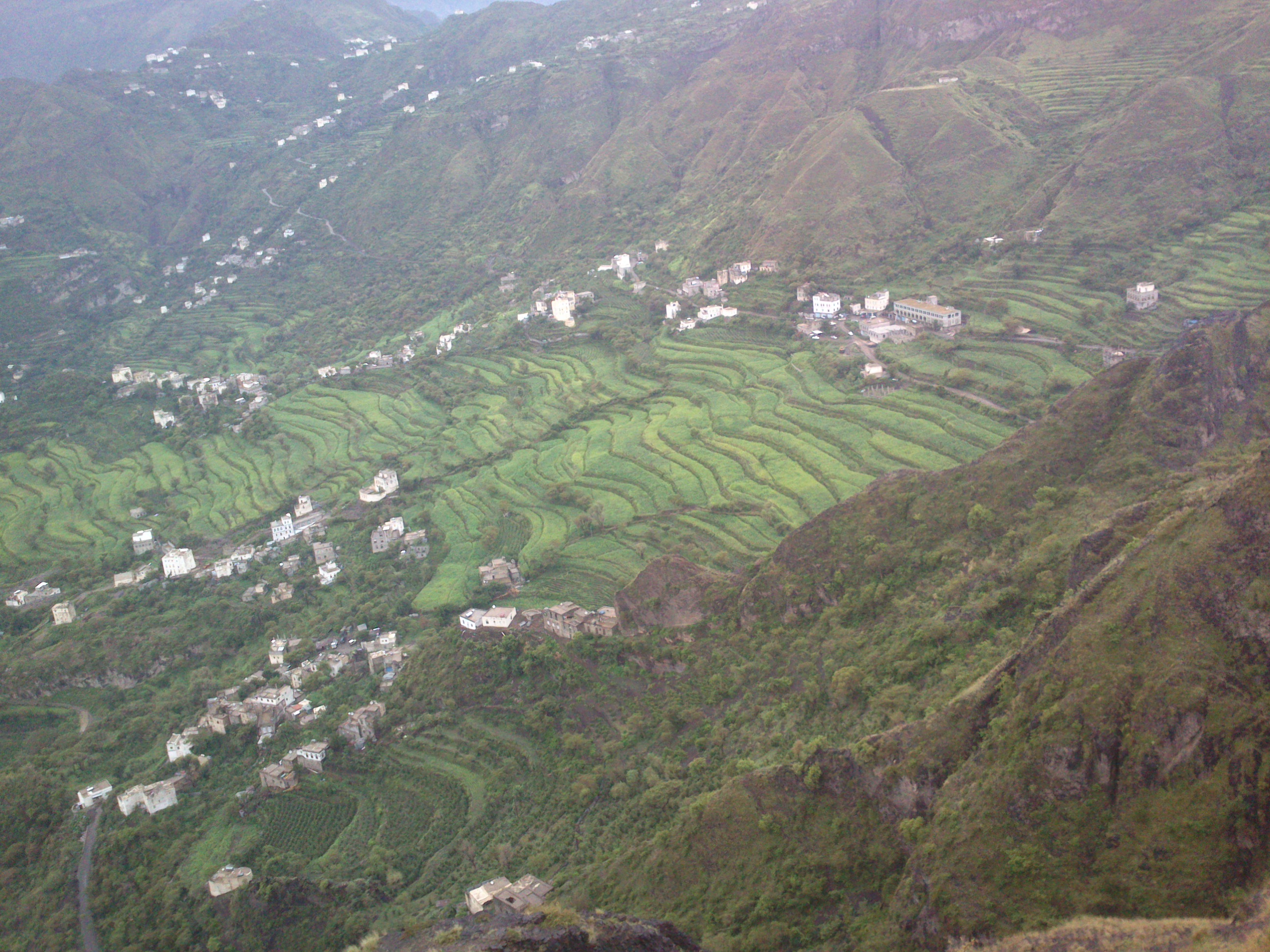

- Location in Yemen
- Coordinates: 14°06′58″N 44°04′55″E
- Country: Yemen
- Governorate: Ibb

Population (2003)
  - Total: 105,998
- Time zone: UTC+3 (Yemen Standard Time)

Hubaysh District (Arabic: مديرية حبيش) is a district of the Ibb Governorate, Yemen. In 2003, the district had a population of 105,998.
