= Ibb Governorate =

Governorate of Yemen

Ibb محافظة إبّ
- Governorate
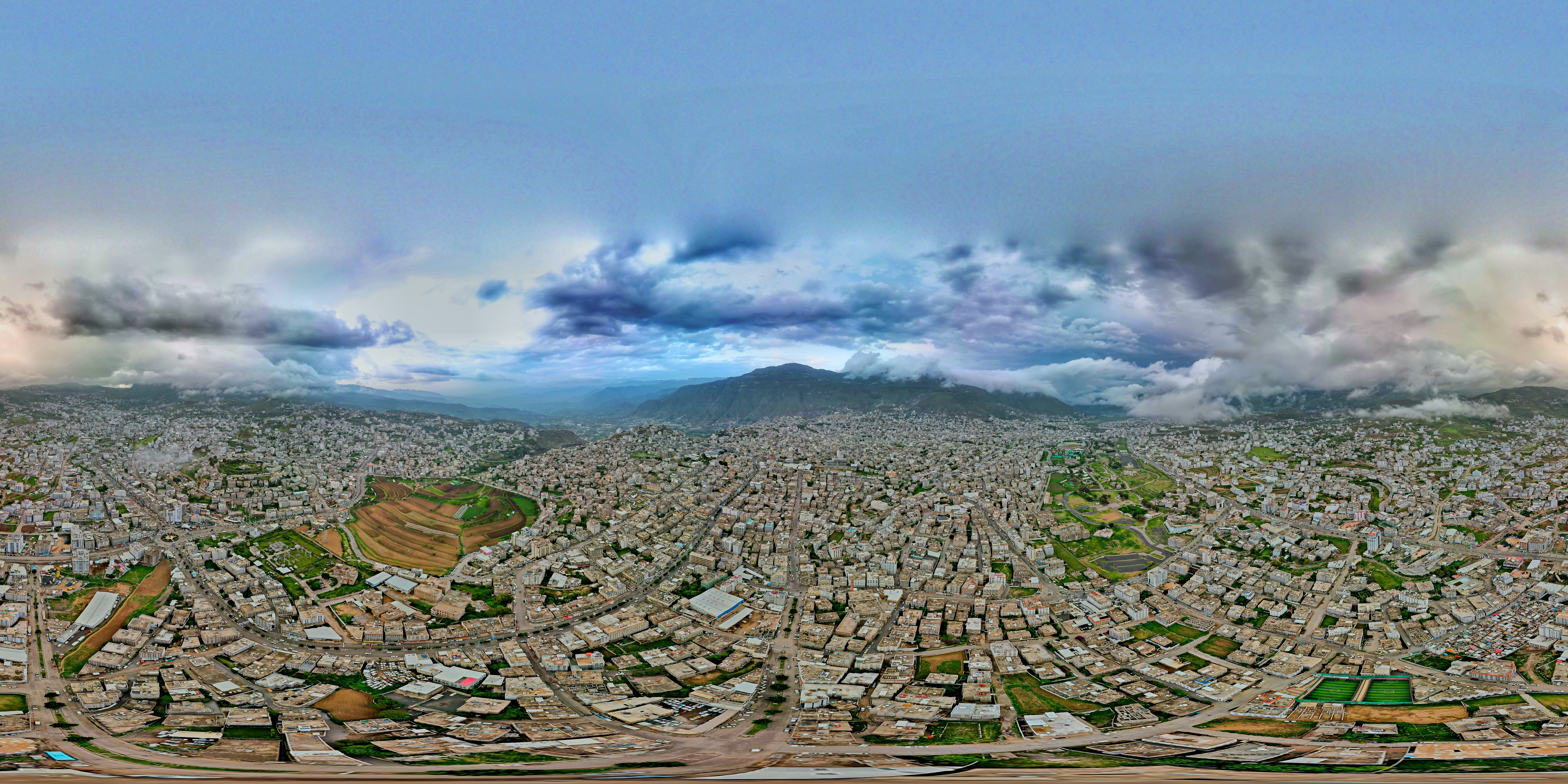

- Coordinates: 13°57′N 44°11′E
- Country: Yemen
- Region: Janad Region
- Seat: Ibb

Area
  - Total: 6,484 km^{2} (2,503 sq mi)

Population (2011)
  - Total: 4,560,000
  - Density: 703/km^{2} (1,820/sq mi)

Ibb (Arabic: إِبّ ʾIbb) is a governorate of Yemen. It is located in the inland south of the country with Ta'izz Governorate to the southwest, Ad Dali' Governorate to the southeast, Dhamar Governorate to the north, and short borders with Al Bayda' Governorate to the east and Al Hudaydah Governorate to the west. It has an area of 5,344 km² and a population estimated at around 1,665,000 in 2004, making it the most densely populated governorate in Yemen outside of San'a city. It is the third largest province in Yemen.

Its capital is Ibb, which, along with Jibla, are extremely significant historic cities. The province contains many attractions in districts such as Yareem, Ba'dan and Al-Sabrah. Ibb is located on the southwestern side of the escarpment of the Yemen Highlands, with dramatic drops to Ta'izz city and the Tihama coastline. There are also impressive views of 3,070 metre high Jabal Sabir to the south.

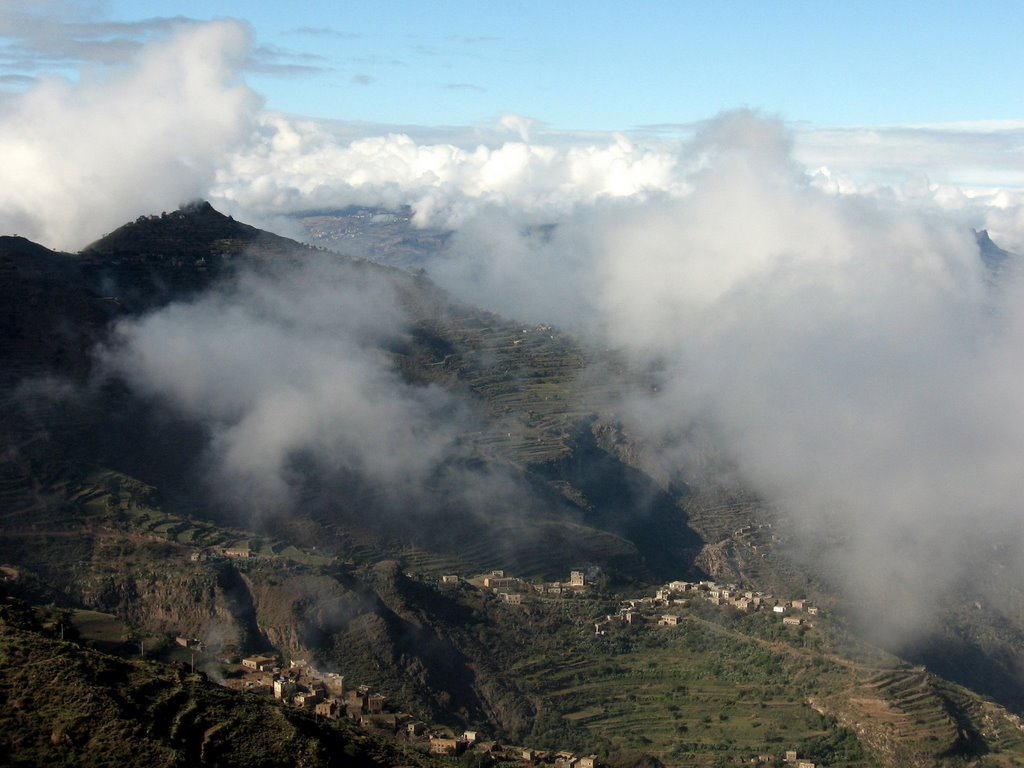
Countryside in Ibb Governorate

Owing to the way in which it captures the upper-level southwestern monsoonal flow during the months from April to October, Ibb governorate is the wettest place in Arabia. Though meteorological data are exceedingly poor and of questionable accuracy, the annual precipitation is probably more than 1,000 mm (40 inches) and some estimate suggest it could be as high as 1,500mm (60 inches). There is little rain from November to February, but for the rest of the year there is probably at least 100mm (4 inches) of rain per month. Temperatures are warm, averaging about 30 °C (86 °F) in the day but nights are quite cool.

Because of its abundant rainfall, Ibb is known as "the fertile province". Almost the whole area of the governorate outside urban centres is cultivated despite the steep terrain, and the number of crops produced is extraordinarily large for so small an area. Qat is particularly important, but wheat, barley, sesame and sorghum are the major sources of food for most people outside Ibb city. Sophisticated systems for management and storage of water from the seasonal rains allows extra crops to be grown during the dry season.

This sophisticated agriculture allows Ibb to support an extremely dense rural population, with densities of up to 500 people/km² common in the wettest areas.

In recent years, Ibb governorate has been the scene of numerous sit-ins in protest at government policies: many of the most significant anti-government protesters since 1999 have been natives of Ibb and surrounding areas.

== Geography ==
Ibb province contains green calchol and mountainous highlands. It is also characterized by a mild climate in different days of the year and large quantities of the rain during the winter.

=== Adjacent governorates ===
Governorates of Yemen

- Dhamar Governorate (north and west)
- Al Bayda Governorate (east)
- Dhale Governorate (east)
- Taiz Governorate (south)
- Al Hudaydah Governorate (west)

=== Districts ===
Ibb Governorate is divided into the following 20 districts. These districts are further divided into sub-districts, and then further subdivided into villages:

- Al Dhihar district
- Al Makhadir district
- Al Mashannah district
- Al Qafr district
- Al Udayn district
- An Nadirah district
- Ar Radmah district
- As Sabrah district
- As Saddah district
- As Sayyani district
- Ash Sha'ir district
- Ba'dan district
- Dhi As Sufal district
- Far Al Udayn district
- Hazm Al Udayn district
- Hubaysh district
- Ibb district
- Jiblah district
- Mudhaykhirah district
- Yarim district

== See also ==
- Sarawat Mountains
  - Jabal Hubaysh, Yemen
  - Rada'a
