= List of Kings of Yemen =

List of kings of Yemen could refer to:

- List of rulers of Saba and Himyar
- Imams of Yemen

== List of imams ==
There is no uncontroversial list of imams of Yemen, since many imams were not universally recognized, and sometimes eclipsed by the rule of lowland dynasties or by the Turks. The following list is fairly inclusive.

- al-Hadi ila'l-Haqq Yahya bin al-Husayn bin al-Qasim ar-Rassi 897–911
- al-Murtada Muhammad 911–913, d. 922 (son)
- an-Nasir Ahmad 913–934 or 937 (brother)
- al-Muntakhab al-Hasan 934–936 or 939 (son)
- al-Mukhtar al-Qasim 936–956 (brother)
- al-Mansur Yahya 934–976 (brother)
- ad-Da'i Yusuf 977–999 (son)
- al-Mansur al-Qasim al-Iyyani bin Ali 999–1002
- ad-Da'i Yusuf 1002–1012 (second reign)
- al-Mahdi al-Husayn 1003–1013 (son of al-Mansur al-Qasim)
- al-Mu'ayyad Ahmad bin al-Husayn 1013–1020
- Abu Talib Yahya 1020–1033
- al-Mu’id li-Din Illah 1027–1030
- Abu Hashim al-Hasan 1031–1040
- Abu'l-Fath an-Nasir ad-Dailami bin al-Husayn 1038–1053
- al-Muhtasib al-Mujahid Hamzah 1060–1067 (son of Abu Hashim al-Hasan)
- al-Mutawakkil Ahmad bin Sulayman 1138–1171 (descended from an-Nasir Ahmad)
- al-Mansur Abdallah bin Hamzah 1187–1217 (descended from al-Muhtasib al-Mujahid Hamzah)
- an-Nasir Muhammad 1217–1226 (son)
- al-Hadi Yahya bin Muhsin 1217–1239
- al-Mahdi Ahmad bin al-Husayn 1248–1258
- al-Hasan bin Wahhas 1258–1260, d. 1285
- Yahya bin Muhammad as-Siraji 1261–1262, d. 1296
- al-Mansur al-Hasan bin Badr ad-Din 1262–1271 (son of a cousin of al-Hadi Yahya)
- al-Mahdi Ibrahim bin Ahmad Taj ad-Din 1272–1276, d. 1284 (nephew)
- al-Mutawakkil al-Mutahhar bin Yahya bin al-Murtada 1276–1298
- al-Mahdi Muhammad 1301–1328 (son)
- al-Mu'ayyad Yahya bin Hamzah 1328–1346
- an-Nasir Ali bin Salah 1328–1329 (grandson of al-Mahdi Ibrahim)
- Ahmad bin Ali al-Fathi 1329–1349
- al-Wathiq al-Mutahhar 1349 (son of al-Mahdi Muhammad)
- al-Mahdi Ali bin Muhammad 1349–1372
- al-Nasir Muhammad Salah al-Din 1372–1391 (son)
- al-Mansur Ali 1391–1436 (son)
- al-Mahdi Ahmad bin Yahya bin al-Murtada 1391–1392, d. 1436
- al-Hadi Ali bin al-Muayyad 1393–1432
- al-Mahdi Salah ad-Din bin Ali 1436–1445
- al-Mansur an-Nasir bin Muhammad 1436–1462 (great-great-grandson of al-Mutawakkil al-Mutahhar bin Yahya)
- al-Mutawakkil al-Mutahhar bin Muhammad 1436–1474
- al-Mu’ayyad Muhammad 1462–1503 (son of al-Mansur an-Nasir)
- an-Nasir Muhammad bin Yusuf 1474–1488
- al-Hadi Izz ad-Din bin al-Hasan 1474–1495 (grandson of al-Hadi Ali)
- al-Mansur Muhammad bin Ali al-Washali 1475–1504
- an-Nasir al-Hasan 1495–1523 (son of al-Hadi Izz-ad-Din)
- al-Mutawakkil Yahya Sharaf ad-Din bin Shams-ad-Din 1506–1555 (grandson of al-Mahdi Ahmad)
- al-Mutahhar 1547–1572 (son)
- an-Nasir al-Hasan bin Ali 1579–1585
- al-Mansur al-Qasim bin Muhammad 1597–1620
- al-Mu'ayyad Muhammad I 1620–1644 (son)
- al-Mutawakkil Isma'il 1644–1676 (brother)
- al-Mahdi Ahmad bin al-Hasan 1676–1681 (nephew)
- al-Mu'ayyad Muhammad II 1681–1686 (son of al-Mutawakkil Isma'il)
- al-Mahdi Muhammad 1687–1718 (son of al-Mahdi Ahmad)
- al-Mansur al-Husayn I bin al-Qasim 1716–1720 (grandson of al-Mu'ayyad Muhammad I)
- al-Mutawakkil al-Qasim bin al-Hasan 1716–1727 (grandson of al-Mahdi Ahmad)
- An-Nasir Muhammad (Zaidi imam) bin Ishaq 1723, d. 1754 (grandson of al-Mahdi Ahmad)
- al-Mansur al-Husayn II 1727–1748 (son of al-Mutawakkil al-Qasim)
- al-Mahdi Abbas 1748–1775 (son)
- al-Mansur Ali I 1775–1809 (son)
- al-Mutawakkil Ahmad 1809–1816 (son)
- al-Mahdi Abdallah 1816–1835 (son)
- al-Mansur Ali II 1835–1837, d. 1871 (son)
- an-Nasir Abdallah bin al-Hasan bin Ahmad 1837–1840 (great-grandson of al-Mahdi Abbas)
- al-Hadi Muhammad 1840–1844 (son of al-Mutawakkil Ahmad)
- al-Mansur Ali II 1844–1845 (second reign)
- al-Mutawakkil Muhammad bin Yahya 1845–1849 (grandson of al-Mansur Ali I)
- al-Mansur Ali II 1849–1850 (third reign)
- al-Mansur Ahmad bin Hashim 1849–1853
- al-Mu'ayyad Abbas bin Abd ar-Rahman 1850
- al-Mansur Ali II 1851 (fourth reign)
- al-Hadi Ghalib 1851–1852, d. 1885 (son of al-Mutawakkil Muhammad)
- al-Mansur Muhammad bin Abdallah 1853–1890
- al-Mutawakkil al-Muhsin bin Ahmad 1855–1878
- al-Hadi Ghalib 1858–1872 (second reign)
- al-Mansur al-Husayn III bin Muhammad bin al-Hadi 1859–1863, d. 1888
- al-Hadi Sharaf ad-Din bin Muhammad bin Abd ar-Rahman 1878–1890
- al-Mansur Muhammad bin Yahya Hamid ad-Din 1890–1904
- al-Mutawakkil Yahya Muhammad Hamid ad-Din 1904–1948 (son)
- an-Nasir Ahmad bin Yahya 1948–1962 (son of al-Mutawakkil Yahya Muhammad Hamid ed-Din)
- al-Mansur Muhammad al-Badr 1962, d. 1996 (son)

== Kingdom of Yemen (1918–1970) ==
Portrait	Imam (Birth–Death)	Reign			House	Claim
Portrait	Imam (Birth–Death)	Reign start	Reign end	Duration	House	Claim
	Yahya Muhammad Hamid ed-Din (1869–1948)	30 October 1918	17 February 1948 (assassinated.)	29 years, 110 days	Rassid	Son of Muhammad Al-Mansur Imam of the Zaydis since 4 June 1904
	Ahmad bin Yahya (1891–1962)	17 February 1948	19 September 1962	14 years, 214 days	Rassid	Son of Yahya
	Muhammad al-Badr (1926–1996)	19 September 1962	26 September 1962 (deposed.)	7 days	Rassid	Son of Ahmad

=== Kingdom of Yemen in Exile (1962–1970) ===
Portrait	Imam (Birth–Death)	Reign			House	Claim
Portrait	Imam (Birth–Death)	Reign start	Reign end	Duration	House	Claim
	Muhammad al-Badr (1926–1996)	27 September 1962	1 December 1970	8 years, 65 days	Rassid	Son of Ahmad

For continuation of leadership after 1962, see President of Yemen Arab Republic.
