= List of 14th-century religious leaders =

This is a list of the top-level leaders for religious groups with at least 50,000 adherents, and that led anytime from January 1, 1301, to December 31, 1400. It should likewise only name leaders listed on other articles and lists.

== Christianity ==
=== Catholicism ===
- Roman Catholic Church (complete list) –

- Boniface VIII, Pope (1294–1303)
- Benedict XI, Pope (1303–1304)
- Clement V, Pope (1305–1314)
- John XXII, Pope (1316–1334)
- Benedict XII, Pope (1334–1342)
- Clement VI, Pope (1342–1352)
- Innocent VI, Pope (1352–1362)
- Urban V, Pope (1362–1370)
- Gregory XI, Pope (1370–1378)
- Urban VI, Pope (1378–1389)
- Boniface IX, Pope (1389–1404)

=== Eastern Orthodoxy ===
- Church of Constantinople – (complete list), the first among equals in Eastern Orthodoxy

- John XII, Ecumenical Patriarch of Constantinople (1294–1303)
- Athanasius I, Ecumenical Patriarch of Constantinople (1289–1293, 1303–1310)
- Nephon I, Ecumenical Patriarch of Constantinople (1310–1314)
- John XIII Glykys, Ecumenical Patriarch of Constantinople (1315–1320)
- Gerasimos I, Ecumenical Patriarch of Constantinople (1320–1321)
- Isaias, Ecumenical Patriarch of Constantinople (1323–1334)
- John XIV Kalekas, Ecumenical Patriarch of Constantinople (1334–1347)
- Isidore I, Ecumenical Patriarch of Constantinople (1347–1350)
- Callistus I, Ecumenical Patriarch of Constantinople (1350–1354, 1355–1363)
- Philotheus Kokkinos, Ecumenical Patriarch of Constantinople (1354–1355, 1364–1376)
- Callistus I, Ecumenical Patriarch of Constantinople (1350–1354, 1355–1363)
- Philotheus Kokkinos, Ecumenical Patriarch of Constantinople (1354–1355, 1364–1376)
- Macarius, Ecumenical Patriarch of Constantinople (1376–1379, 1390–1391)
- Nilus Kerameus, Ecumenical Patriarch of Constantinople (1379–1388)
- Antony IV, Ecumenical Patriarch of Constantinople (1389–1390, 1391–1397)
- Macarius, Ecumenical Patriarch of Constantinople (1376–1379, 1390–1391)
- Antony IV, Ecumenical Patriarch of Constantinople (1389–1390, 1391–1397)
- Callistus II Xanthopoulos, Ecumenical Patriarch of Constantinople (1397)
- Matthew I, Ecumenical Patriarch of Constantinople (1397–1410)

=== Oriental Orthodoxy ===
- Ethiopian Church, (complete list) -

- Yohannes (fl. 14th century)
- Yaqob (c. 1337–1344)
- vacant (1344–1348)
- Salama II (1348–1388)
- Bartalomewos (1398/9–1436)

== Islam ==
=== Sunni ===
- Abbasid Caliphate, Cairo (complete list) –

- al-Hakim I, Caliph (1262–1302)
- al-Mustakfi I, Caliph (1303–1340)
- al-Wathiq I, Caliph (1340–1341)
- al-Hakim II, Caliph (1341–1352)
- al-Mu'tadid I, Caliph (1352–1362)
- al-Mutawakkil I, Caliph (1362–1377, 1377–1383, 1389–1406)
- al-Musta'sim, Caliph (1377, 1386–1389)
- al-Wathiq II, Caliph (1383–1386)

=== Shia ===
- Twelver Islam

- Imams (complete list) –

- Muhammad al-Mahdi, Imam (874–present) Shia belief holds that he was hidden by Allah in 874.

==== Isma'ili ====
- Nizari Isma'ilism (complete list) –

- Shams al-Din Muhammad, Imam (1257–1310)

- Qasim-Shahi line:

- Qasim Shah, Imam
- Islam Shah, Imam
- Muhammad ibn Islam Shah, Imam

- Muhammad-Shahi line:

- Ala al-Din Mu'min Shah ibn Muhammad
- Muhammad Shah ibn Mu'min Shah
- Radhi al-Din ibn Muhammad Shah

- Tayyibi Isma'ilism (complete list) –

- Ibrahim ibn al-Husayn, Da'i al-Mutlaq (1287–1328)
- Muhammad ibn Hatim, Da'i al-Mutlaq (1328–1329)
- Ali Shams al-Din I, Da'i al-Mutlaq (1329–1345)
- Abd al-Muttalib, Da'i al-Mutlaq (1345–1354)
- Abbas ibn Muhammad, Da'i al-Mutlaq (1354–1377)
- Abdallah Fakhr al-Din, Da'i al-Mutlaq (1377–1407)

==== Zaydi ====
- Zaydi imams of Yemen (complete list) –

- al-Mahdi Muhammad bin al-Mutahhar, Imam (1301–1328)
- al-Mu'ayyad Yahya, Imam (1328–1346)
- an-Nasir Ali bin Salah, Imam (1328–1329)
- Ahmad bin Ali al-Fathi, Imam (1329–1349)
- al-Wathiq al-Mutahhar, Imam (1349)
- al-Mahdi Ali bin Muhammad, Imam (1349–1372)
- al-Nasir Muhammad Salah al-Din, Imam (1372–1391)
- al-Mansur Ali bin Salah ad-Din, Imam (1391–1436)
- al-Hadi Ali, Imam (1393–1432)

== See also ==
- Religious leaders by year
- List of state leaders in the 14th century
- Lists of colonial governors by century
