= List of state leaders in the 14th century =

This is a list of state leaders in the 14th century (1301–1400) AD, except for the many leaders within the Holy Roman Empire.

== Africa ==
=== Africa: Central ===
Angola

- Kingdom of Kongo: Kilukeni (complete list) –

- Lukeni lua Nimi, Manikongo (1390s)

Cameroon

- Kingdom of Bamum (complete list) –

- Nchare Yen, Mfon (1394–1418)

Chad

- Kanem Empire (Kanem–Bornu) (complete list) –

- Ibrahim I Nikale, Mai (1290–1311)
- Abdullah II, Mai (1311–1322)
- Selema III, Mai (1322–1326)
- Kuri I, Mai (1326–1327)
- Kuri II, Mai (1327–1328)
- Muhammad I, Mai (1328–1329)
- Idris I, Mai (1329–1353)
- Dawud, Mai (1353–1363)
- Uthman I, Mai (1363–1366)
- Uthman II, Mai (1366–1368)
- Abubakar Liyatu, Mai (1368–1369)
- Idris II Saradima, Mai (1369–1376)
- Umar I Idrismi, Mai (1376–1387)

To the Bornu Empire in West Africa

=== Africa: East ===
Great Lakes area

Uganda

- Buganda (complete list) –

- Kato Kintu, Kabaka (early 14th century)
- Chwa I, Kabaka (mid-14th century)
- Kimera, Kabaka (c.1374–c.1404)

Horn of Africa area

Ethiopia

- Ethiopian Empire: Solomonic dynasty (complete list) –

- Wedem Arad, Emperor (1299–1314)
- Amda Seyon I, Emperor (1314–1344)
- Newaya Krestos, Emperor (1344–1372)
- Newaya Maryam, Emperor (1372–1382)
- Dawit I, Emperor (1382–1413)

- Kingdom of Kaffa (complete list) –

- Minjo, King (c.1390)

Somalia

- Sultanate of Ifat: Walashma dynasty (complete list) –

- Zubēr Abūd, Sultan (13th–14th century)
- Layla Abūd, Māti (14th century)
- Haqq ad-Din I, Sultan (?–1328)
- Sabr ad-Din I, Sultan (1328–1332)
- Jamal ad-Din I, Sultan (1332–?)
- NasradDīn Naḥwi, Sultan (14th century)
- Ali ibn Sabr ad-Din, Sultan (14th century)
- Ahmad ibn Ali, Sultan (14th century)
- Haqq ad-Din II, Sultan (?–1374)
- Sa'ad ad-Din II, Sultan (1374–1403)

- Warsangali Sultanate –

- Garaad Dhidhin, Sultan (1298–1311)
- Garaad Hamar Gale, Sultan (1311–1328)
- Garaad Ibrahim, Sultan (1328–1340)
- Garaad Omer, Sultan (1340–1355)
- Garaad Mohamud I, Sultan (1355–1375)
- Garaad Ciise I, Sultan (1375–1392)
- Garaad Siciid, Sultan (1392–1409)

=== Africa: Northeast ===
Egypt

- Abbasid Caliphate, Cairo (complete list) –

- al-Hakim I, Caliph (1262–1302)
- al-Mustakfi I, Caliph (1303–1340)
- al-Wathiq I, Caliph (1340–1341)
- al-Hakim II, Caliph (1341–1352)
- al-Mu'tadid I, Caliph (1352–1362)
- al-Mutawakkil I, Caliph (1362–1377, 1377–1383, 1389–1406)
- al-Musta'sim, Caliph (1377, 1386–1389)
- al-Wathiq II, Caliph (1383–1386)

- Mamluk Sultanate (complete list) –

Bahri dynasty

- Al-Nasir Muhammad, Sultan (1299–1309)
- Baibars II, Sultan (1309–1310)
- Al-Nasir Muhammad, Sultan (1310–1341)
- Al-Mansur Abu Bakr, Sultan (1341)
- Al-Ashraf Kujuk, Sultan (1341–1342)
- An-Nasir Ahmad, Sultan (1342)
- As-Salih Ismail, Sultan (1342–1345)
- Al-Kamil Sha'ban, Sultan (1345–1346)
- Al-Muzaffar Hajji, Sultan (1346–1347)
- An-Nasir Hasan, Sultan (1347–1351)
- As-Salih Salih, Sultan (1351–1354)
- An-Nasir Hasan, Sultan (1354–1361)
- Al-Mansur Muhammad, Sultan (1361–1363)
- Al-Ashraf Sha'ban, Sultan (1363–1377)
- Al-Mansur Ali II, Sultan (1377–1381)
- As-Salih Hajji, Sultan (1381–1382)

Burji dynasty

- Barquq, Sultan (1382–1389)
- As-Salih Hajji, Sultan (1389–1390)
- Barquq, Sultan (1390–1399)
- An-Nasir Faraj, Sultan (1399–1405)

Sudan

- Makuria (complete list) –

- Ayay, King (c.1304/5)
- Kernabes, King (1311–1316)
- Barschanbu, King (1316–1317)
- Kanz ed-Dawla, King (c.1317)
- Kernabes, King (1323–1324)
- Banu Kanz, King (c.1324)
- al-Amir Abi Abdallah Kanz el-Dawla, King (1333)

=== Africa: Northcentral ===
Tunisia

- Hafsid dynasty (complete list) –

- Muhammad I, Khalif (1295–1309)
- Abu Bakr I, Khalif (1309)
- Aba al-Baqa Khalid an-Nasir, Khalif (1309–1311)
- Aba Yahya Zakariya al-Lihyani, Khalif (1311–1317)
- Muhammad II, Khalif (1317–1318)
- Abu Bakr II, Khalif (1318–1346)
- Abu Hafs Umar II, Khalif (1346–1349)
- Ahmad I, Khalif (1349)
- Ishaq II, Khalif (1350–1369)
- Abu al-Baqa Khalid, Khalif (1369–1371)
- Ahmad II, Khalif (1371–1394)
- Abd al-Aziz II, Khalif (1394–1434)

=== Africa: Northwest ===
Morocco

- Marinid dynasty of Morocco (complete list) –

- Abu Yaqub Yusuf an-Nasr, Sultan (1286–1307)
- Abu Thabit Amir, Sultan (1307–1308)
- Abu al-Rabi Sulayman, Sultan (1308–1310)
- Abu Sa'id Uthman II, Sultan (1310–1331)
- Abu al-Hassan Ali, Sultan (1331–1351)
- Abu Inan Faris, Sultan (1348–1358)
- Muhammad ibn Faris, Sultan (1358, 1362–1366)
- Abu Bakr ibn Faris, Sultan (1358–1359)
- Ibrahim ibn Ali, Sultan (1359–1361)
- Tashfin ibn Ali, Sultan (1361–1362)
- Muhammad ibn Faris, Sultan (1358, 1362–1366)
- Abu Faris Abdul Aziz I, Sultan (1366–1372)
- Muhammad III ibn Abd al-Aziz, Sultan (1372–1374)
- Abu'l-Abbas Ahmad al-Mustansir, Sultan (1374–1384, 1387–1393)
- Musa ibn Faris al-Mutawakkil, Sultan (1384–1386)
- Muhammad ibn Ahmad al-Wathiq, Sultan (1386–1387)
- Abu'l-Abbas Ahmad al-Mustansir, Sultan (1374–1384, 1387–1393)
- Abd al-Aziz II ibn Ahmad II, Sultan (1393–1396)
- Abdallah ibn Ahmad II, Sultan (1396–1398)
- Abu Said Uthman III, Sultan (1398–1420)

=== Africa: South ===
Angola

- Kingdom of Ndongo (complete list) –

as BaKongo tributary
- a-Nzinga, Ngola (c.1358)

=== Africa: West ===
Benin

- Kingdom of Benin (complete list) –

- Udagbedo, Oba (1292–1329)
- Ohen, Oba (1329–1366)
- Egbeka, Oba (1366–1397)
- Orobiru, Oba (1397–1434)

Burkina Faso

- Mossi Kingdom of Nungu (complete list) –

- Untani, Nunbado (1292–1336)
- Banydoba, Nunbado (1336–1380)
- Labi Diebo, Nunbado (1380–1395)
- Tenin, Nunbado (1395–1425)

Mali

- Mali Empire: Keita dynasty (complete list) –

- Gao, Mansa (1300–1305)
- Mohammed ibn Gao, Mansa (1305–1310)
- Abu Bakr II, Mansa (1310–1312)
- Musa I, Mansa (1312–1337)
- Maghan I, Mansa (1337–1341)
- Suleyman, Mansa (1341–1360)
- Kassa, Mansa (1360)
- Mari Djata II of Mali, Mansa (1360–1374)
- Musa II of Mali, Mansa (1374–1387)
- Maghan II, Mansa (1387–1389)
- Sandaki, Mansa (1389–1390)
- Maghan III, Mansa (1390–1400)
- Musa III, Mansa (1400–c.1440)

Nigeria

- Bornu Empire (Kanem–Bornu) (complete list) –

From the Kanem Empire in Central Africa

- Said, Mai (1381–1382)
- Kaday II, Mai (1382–1383)
- Bir III, Mai (1383–1415)

- Oyo Empire (complete list) –

- Oranyan, Alaafin (c.1300–?)
- Ajaka, Alaafin (14th century)
- Shango, Alaafin (14th century)
- Ajaka, Alaafin (14th century)
- Aganju, Alaafin (?–c.1400)

- Kingdom/Sultanate of Kano (complete list) –

- Shekarau, King (1290–1307)
- Tsamiya, King (1307–1343)
- Usmanu Zamnagawa, King (1343–1349)
- Yaji I, King/Sultan (1349–1385)
- Bugaya, Sultan (1385–1390)
- Kanejeji, Sultan (1390–1410)

- Kingdom of Nri (complete list) –

- Eze Nri Jiọfọ I, King (1300–1390)
- Eze Nri Ọmalonyeso, King (1391–1464)

Senegal

- Jolof / Wolof Empire (complete list) –

- N'Dyadya N'Dyaye, Buur-ba (1350–1370)
- Sare N'Dyaye, Buur-ba (1370–1390)
- N'Diklam Sare, Buur-ba (1390–1420)

== Americas ==
=== Americas: North ===
Mexico

- Azcapotzalco –

- Tezozomoc I, Tlatoani (1331)
- Aculnahuacatl, Tlatoani (c.1302–c.1367)
- Tezozomoc, Tlatoani (1353/71–1426)

- Cuernavaca –

- Macuilxochitl, Tlatoani (1365)
- Tezcacohuatzin / Ozomatzinteuctli, Tlatoani (1365)

- Tarascan state (complete list) –

- Tariácuri, Cazonci (c.1300–c.1350)
- Hiquingaje, Cazonci (c.1350–?)

- Tenochtitlan (complete list) —

under the Tepanec suzerainty

- Acamapichtli, Tlatoani (1375–1395)
- Huitzilihuitl, Tlatoani (1395-c. 1417)

- Tepanec –

- Tetzotzomoc, Tlatoani (1367–1426)

- Zapotec civilization –

- Zaachila –

- Zaachila Yoo, King (1386–1415)

=== Americas: South ===
Colombia

- Muisca Confederation

- Zaque (complete list) –

- Hunzahúa, Zaque (?–1470)
- Michuá, Zaque (1470–1490)
- Quemuenchatocha, Zaque (1490–1537)

- Zipa (complete list) –

- Meicuchuca, Zipa (1450–1470)
- Saguamanchica, Zipa (1470–1490)
- Nemequene, Zipa (1490–1514)

Peru

- Kingdom of Cusco (complete list) –

- Mayta Cápac, Inca (c.1290–1320)
- Cápac Yupanqui, Inca (c.1320–1350)
- Roca, Inca (c.1350–1380)
- Yawar Waqaq, Inca (c.1380–1410)

== Asia ==
=== Asia: Central ===
Kazakhstan

- Chagatai Khanate (complete list) –

- Duwa, Khan (1287–1307)
- Könchek, Khan (1306–1308)
- Taliqu, Khan (1308–1309)
- Esen Buqa I, Khan (1309–c.1318)
- Kebek, Khan (1309, c.1318–1325)
- Eljigidey, Khan (1325–1329)
- Duwa Temür, Khan (1329–1330)
- Tarmashirin, Khan (1331–1334)
- Buzan, Khan (1334–1335)
- Changshi, Khan (1335–1338)
- Yesun Temur, Khan (c.1338–c.1342)
- 'Ali-Sultan, Khan (1342)
- Muhammad I ibn Pulad, Khan (1342–1343)
- Qazan ibn Yasaur, Khan (1343–1346)
- Danishmendji, Khan (1346–1348)
- Tughlugh Timur, Khan of Eastern Chagatai (c.1347–1363), Khan of Western Chagatai (c.1360–1363)

- Western Chagatai Khanate (complete list) –

- Bayan Qulï, Khan (1348–1358)
- Shah Temur, Khan (1358)
- Tughlugh Timur, Khan of Eastern and Western Chagatai (c.1360–1363)
- Adil-Sultan, Khan (1363)
- Khabul Shah, Khan (1364–1370)
From 1370 on, the Chagatai Khans were puppets of Timur
- Soyurghatmïsh Khan, Khan (1370–1384)
- Mahmud, Khan (1384–1402)

- Moghulistan, Eastern Chagatai Khanate (complete list) –

- Tughlugh Timur, Khan (c.1347–1363)
- Ilyas Khoja, Khan (1363–1368)
- Qamar-ud-din Khan Dughlat, Khan (1368–1392)
- Khizr Khoja, Khan (1389–1399)
- Shams-i-Jahan, Khan (1399–1408)

- Kara Del

- Unaširi, Khan (1380–1393)
- Engke Temür, Khan (1393–1405)

Mongolia

- Mongol Empire (complete list) –

- Temür, Khan / Emperor (1294–1307)

Russia

- Golden Horde (complete list) –

- Toqta, Khan (1291—1312)
- Uzbeg Khan, Khan (1312–1341)
- Tini Beg, Khan (1341–1342)
- Jani Beg, Khan (1342—1357)
- Berdi Beg, Khan (1357—1361)
- Qulpa, Khan (1359–1360)
- Nawruz Beg, Khan (1360–1361)
- Khidr, Khan (1361–1362)
- Timur Khwaja, Khan (1362)
- Abdallah, Khan (1362–1370)
- Murad, Khan (1362–1367)
- Aziz, Khan (1367–1369)
- Jani Beg II, Khan (1369–1370)
- Muhammad Bolak, Khan (1370–1379)
- Tulun Beg Khanum (1370–1373)
- Aig Beg, Khan (1373–1376)
- Arab Shaykh, Khan (1376–1379)
- Kagan Beg, Khan (1375–1376)
- Ilbani, Khan (1373–1376)
- Ḥājjī Cherkes, Khan (1375–1376)
- Urus Khan, Khan (1376–1378)
- Toqtaqiya, Khan (1378)
- Timur-Malik, Khan (1378-1379)
- Tokhtamysh, Khan (1378–1395)
- Temür Qutlugh, Khan (1396–1401)
- Shadi Beg, Khan (1399–1407)

- White Horde (complete list) –

- Köchü, Khan (c.1280–1302)
- Buyan (Bayan), Khan (1302–1309)
- Sasibuqa, Khan (1309–1315)
- Ilbasan, Khan (1315–1320)
- Mubarak Khwaja, Khan (1320–1344)
- Chimtay, Khan (1344–1374)
- Urus, Khan (1374–1376)
- Toqtaqiya, Khan (1376)
- Timur-Malik, Khan (1377)
- Tokhtamysh, Khan (1377–1378)
- Koiruchik, Khan (1378–1399)

- Blue Horde (complete list) –

- Toqta, Khan (1291—1312)
- Öz Beg Khan, Khan (1312–1341)
- Tini Beg, Khan (1341–1342)
- Jani Beg, Khan (1342—1357)
- Berdi Beg, Khan (1357—1361)
- Qulpa, Khan (1359–1360)
- Nawruz Beg, Khan (1360–1361)
- Khidr, Khan (1361–1362)
- Timur Khwaja, Khan (1362)
- Abdallah, Khan (1362–1370)

Siberia

- Khanate of Sibir (complete list) –

- Khoja bin Taibugha, Khan (?)
- Tokhtamysh, Khan (1396–1406)

Tibet

- Guge

- rNam rgyal lde, King (1396?–1424)

- Phagmodrupa dynasty (complete list) –

- Tai Situ Changchub Gyaltsen, Monarch (1354–1364)
- Jamyang Shakya Gyaltsen, Monarch (1364–1373)
- Drakpa Changchub, Monarch (1374–1381)
- Sonam Drakpa, Monarch (1381–1385)
- Drakpa Gyaltsen, Monarch (1385–1432)

=== Asia: East ===
China: Yuan dynasty

- Yuan dynasty (complete list) –

- Temür, Khan / Emperor (1294–1307)
- Külüg, Khan / Emperor (1307–1311)
- Ayurbarwada Buyantu, Khan / Emperor (1311–1320)
- Gegeen, Khan / Emperor (1320–1323)
- Yesün-Temür, Khan / Emperor (1323–1328)
- Ragibagh, Khan / Emperor (1328)
- Jayaatu Tugh Temür, Khan / Emperor (1328–1329, 1329–1332)
- Khutughtu Kusala, Khan / Emperor (1329)
- Rinchinbal, Khan / Emperor (1332)
- Toghon Temür, Khan / Emperor (1333–1368), Emperor of the Northern Yuan (1368–1370)

China: Ming dynasty

- Ming dynasty (complete list) –

- Hongwu, Prince (1364–1368), Emperor (1368–1398)
- Jianwen, Emperor (1398–1402)

Japan: Main

- Kamakura shogunate of Japan

- Emperors (complete list) –

- Go-Fushimi, Emperor (1298–1301)
- Go-Nijō, Emperor (1301–1308)
- Hanazono, Emperor (1308–1318)
- Go-Daigo, Emperor (1318–1339)

- Shōguns (complete list) –

- Prince Hisaaki, Shōgun (1289–1308)
- Prince Morikuni, Shōgun (1308–1333)

- Regent of the shogunate (complete list) –

- Hōjō Sadatoki, Shikken (1284–1301)
- Hōjō Morotoki, Shikken (1301–1311)
- Hōjō Takatoki, Shikken (1316–1326)

- Kenmu Restoration (complete list) –

- Kōgon, Emperor (1331–1333)
- Kōmyō, Emperor (1336–1348)
- Sukō, Emperor (1348–1351)
- Go-Kōgon, Emperor (1352–1371)
- Go-En'yū, Emperor (1371–1382)
- Go-Komatsu, Emperor (1382–1392)

- Ashikaga shogunate of Japan

- Emperors (complete list) –

- Go-Daigo, Emperor (1318–1339)
- Go-Murakami, Emperor (1339–1368)
- Chōkei, Emperor (1368–1383)
- Go-Kameyama, Emperor (1383–1392)
- Go-Komatsu, Emperor (1392–1412)

- Shōguns –

- Takauji, Shōgun (1338–1358)
- Yoshiakira, Shōgun (1358–1367)
- Yoshimitsu, Shōgun (1367–1395)
- Yoshimochi, Shōgun (1395–1423)

Japan: Ryukyu Kingdoms

- Ryukyu Kingdom: Eiso Dynasty –

- Taisei, Chief (1300–1308)
- Eiji, Chief (1309–1313)
- Tamagusuku, Chief (1314–1336)
- Seii, Chief (1337–1354)

- Chūzan: Ryukyu Kingdoms of the Sanzan period –

Tributary state of the Ming dynasty
- Satto, Chief (1355–1397)
- Bunei, Chief (1398–1406)

- Nanzan: Ryukyu Kingdoms of the Sanzan period –

Tributary state of the Ming dynasty
- Ofusato, Chief (?–1403)

- Hokuzan: Ryukyu Kingdoms of the Sanzan period –

Tributary state of the Ming dynasty
- Haniji, Chief (?–1395)
- Min, Chief (1396–1400)

Korea

- Goryeo (complete list) –

- Chungnyeol, King (1274–1298, 1298–1308)
- Chungseon, King (1298, 1308–1313)
- Chungsuk, King (1313–1330, 1332–1339)
- Chunghye, King (1330–1332, 1339–1344)
- Chungmok, King (1344–1348)
- Chungjeong, King (1348–1351)
- Gongmin, King (1351–1374)
- U, King (1374–1388)
- Chang, King (1388–1389)
- Gongyang, King (1389–1392)

- Joseon (complete list) –

- Taejo, King (1392–1398)
- Jeongjong, King (1398–1400)
- Taejong, King (1400–1418)

Mongolia

- Alliance of the Four Oirat (complete list) –

- Mönkhtömör, leader (c. 1368–1390s)
- Örüg Temür Khan, leader (c. 1399)
- Batula, leader (1399–1408)

- Northern Yuan dynasty (complete list) –

- Toghon Temür, Khan / Emperor (1333–1368), Emperor of the Northern Yuan (1368–1370)
- Biligtü Khan Ayushiridara, Emperor (1370–1378)
- Uskhal Khan Tögüs Temür, Emperor (1378–1388)
- Jorightu Khan Yesüder, Khan (1388–c.1392)
- Engke, Khan (?–1392)
- Elbeg Nigülesügchi, Khan (1392–1399)
- Gün Temür, Khan (1400–1402)

=== Asia: Southeast ===
Brunei

- Bruneian Empire (complete list) –

- Muhammad Shah, Sultan (1368–1402)

Cambodia

- Khmer Empire (complete list) –

- Indravarman III, King (1295–1307)
- Indrajayavarman, King (1307–1327)
- Jayavarman IX, King (1327–1336)
- Trosok Peam, King (1336–1340)
- Nippean Bat, King (1340–1346)
- Lompong Racha, King (1346–1351)
- Soryavong, King (1357–1363)
- Borom Reachea I, King (1363–1373)
- Thomma Saok, King (1373–1393)
- Intharacha, King (1394–c.1421)

Indonesia

Indonesia: Java

- Sunda Kingdom (complete list) –

- Rakeyan Saunggalah, Maharaja (1297–1303)
- Prabu Citraganda, Maharaja (1303–1311)
- Prabu Lingga Dewata, Maharaja (1311–1333)
- Prabu Ajigunawisesa, Maharaja (1333–1340)
- Prabu Maharaja Lingga Buana, Maharaja (1340–1357)
- Mangkubumi Suradipati, Maharaja (1357–1371)
- Prabu Raja Wastu, Maharaja (1371–1475)

- Majapahit: Rajasa dynasty (complete list) –

- Raden Wijaya, King (1294–1309)
- Jayanagara, King (1309–1328)
- Tribhuwana Wijayatunggadewi, King (1328–1350)
- Hayam Wuruk, King (1350–1389),
- Wikramawardhana, King (1389–1429)

Indonesia: Sumatra

- Dharmasraya/ Pagaruyung Kingdom: Mauli dynasty (complete list) –

- Akarendrawarman, King (c.1300)
- Adityawarman, King (c.1347–1375)
- Ananggawarman, King (c.1375)
- Bijayendrawarman ruler (14th century)

- Samudera Pasai Sultanate (complete list) –

- Al-Malik azh-Zhahir I, Sultan (1297–1326)
- Ahmad I, Sultan (1326–1330s)
- Al-Malik azh-Zhahir II, Sultan (1330s–1349)
- Zainal Abidin I, Sultan (1349–1406)

Indonesia: Kalimantan (Borneo)

- Kutai Kartanegara Sultanate –

- Aji Batara Agung Dewa Sakti, Sultan (c.1300–1325)

- Negara Daha –

- Raden Sekarsungsang, ruler (c.1400–15th century)

Indonesia: Sulawesi

- Gowa-Tallo –

- Tumanurung Baine, Queen (mid 14th century)
- Tumassalangga Baraya, King (late 14th century)
- I Puang Lowe Lembang, King (14th/15th century)

- Bone state –

- ManurungngE Rimatajang, King (1330-?)

- Luwu –

- Anakaji, Datu (1293–1330)
- Tampa Balusu, Datu (1330–1365)
- Tanra Balusu, Datu (1365–1402)

Indonesia: Lesser Sunda Islands

- Bali Kingdom (complete list) –

Jaya dynasty
- Mahaguru Dharmottungga Warmadewa, King (before 1324–1328)
- Walajayakertaningrat, King (1328-?)
- Śri Astasura Ratna Bumi Banten, King (fl.1332–1337)
Samprangan
- Sri Aji Kresna Kepakisan, King (14th century)
- Dalem Samprangan, King (14th/15th century)

Indonesia: Maluku Islands

- Sultanate of Tidore (complete list) –

- Sele, King (1334–1372)
- Matagena, King (1372–1405)

- Sultanate of Ternate (complete list) –

- Bakuku/ Kalabata, King (1298–1304)
- Ngara Malamo/ Komala, King (1304–1317)
- Patsaranga Malamo/ Aitsi, King (1317–1322)
- Cili Aiya/ Sidang Arif Malamo, King (1322–1331)
- Panji Malamo/ A'ali, King (1331–1332)
- Shah Alam, King (1332–1343)
- Tulu Malamo/ Fulu, King (1343–1347)
- Kie Mabiji/ Buhayati I, King (1347–1350)
- Ngolo-ma-Kaya/ Muhammad Shah, King (1350–1357)
- Mamoli/ Momole, King (1357–1359)
- Gapi Malamo I/ Muhammad Bakar, King (1359–1372)
- Gapi Baguna I, King (1372–1377)
- Komala Pulu/ Bessi Muhammad Hassan, King (1377–1432)

Laos

- Lan Xang (complete list) –

- Fa Ngum, King (1353–1373)
- Samsenethai, King (1373–1416)

Malaysia: Peninsular

- Old Pahang Kingdom –

- Tajau, Maharaja (c.1378)

- Kedah Sultanate (complete list) –

- Mahmud Shah I, Sultan (1280–1321)
- Ibrahim Shah, Sultan (1321–1373)
- Sulaiman Shah I, Sultan (1373–1423)

- Kelantan Sultanate: Jambi dynasty (complete list) –

- Sang Tawal, Raja (1267–1339)
- Mahmud ibnu 'Abdu'llah, Sultan (1339–1362)
- Baki Shah, Sultan (1362–1418)

- Malacca Sultanate (complete list) –

- Parameswara, Raja of Singapura (1389–1398), Sultan of Malacca (1400–1414)

Myanmar / Burma

- Myinsaing Kingdom (complete list) –

- Athinkhaya, Co-Regent (1297–1310)
- Yazathingyan, Co-Regent (1297–1313)
- Thihathu, Co-Regent of Myinsaing (1297–1313), King of Myinsaing–Pinya (1313–1325)

- Pinya Kingdom (complete list) –

- Thihathu, Co-Regent of Myinsaing (1297–1313), King of Myinsaing–Pinya (1313–1325)
- Uzana I, King (1325–1340)
- Sithu, Regent (1340–1344)
- Kyawswa I, King (1344–1350)
- Kyawswa II, King (1350–1359)
- Narathu, King (1359–1364)
- Uzana II, King (1364)
- Thado Minbya, King of Pinya & Sagaing (1364–1365), King of Ava (1365–1367)

- Sagaing Kingdom (complete list) –

- Saw Yun, King (1315–1327)
- Tarabya I, King (1327–1335/36)
- Shwetaungtet, King (1335/36–1339)
- Kyaswa, King (1339–1349)
- Nawrahta Minye, King (1349)
- Tarabya II, King (1349–1352)
- Minbyauk Thihapate, King (1352–1364)
- Thado Minbya, King of Pinya & Sagaing (1364–1365), King of Ava (1365–1367)

- Kingdom of Ava (complete list) –

- Thado Minbya, King of Pinya & Sagaing (1364–1365), King of Ava (1365–1367)
- Swa Saw Ke, King (1367–1400)
- Tarabya, King (1400)
- Minkhaung I, King (1400–1421)

- Hanthawaddy kingdom (complete list) –

- Wareru, King (1287–1307)
- Hkun Law, King (1307–1311)
- Saw O, King (1311–1323)
- Saw Zein, King (1323–1330)
- Zein Pun, King (1330)
- Saw E, King (1330)
- Binnya E Law, King (1330–1348)
- Binnya U, King (1348–1384)
- Maha Dewi, Regent (1383–1384)
- Razadarit, King (1384–1421)

Philippines

- Tondo (complete list) –

- Gambang, Rajah (c.1390–1417)

- Madja-as (complete list) –

- Paiburong, Datu (13th/14th century)
- Balengkaka, Datu (14th century)
- Kalantiaw, Datu (1365–1437)

- Rajahnate of Cebu –

- Alho, Rajah (c.14th century)
- Ukob, Rajah (c.14th century)

Singapore

- Kingdom of Singapura –

- Sang Nila Utama, Raja (1299–1347)
- Sri Wikrama Wira, Raja (1347–1362)
- Sri Rana Wikrama, Raja (1362–1375)
- Sri Maharaja, Raja (1375–1389)
- Parameswara, Raja of Singapura (1389–1398), Sultan of Malacca (1400–1414)

Thailand

- Sukhothai Kingdom (complete list) –

- Loe Thai, King (1298–1323)
- Ngua Nam Thum, King (1323–1347)
- Maha Thammaracha I, King (1347–1368)
- Maha Thammaracha II, King (1368–1399)
- Maha Thammaracha III, King (1400–1419)

- Lan Na (complete list) –

- Mangrai, King of Ngoenyang (1261–1292), King of Lan Na (1292–1311)
- Chaiyasongkhram, King (1311–1325)
- Saenphu, King (1325–1334)
- Khamfu, King (1334–1336)
- Phayu, King (1336–1355)
- Kue Na, King (1355–1385)
- Saenmueangma, King (1385–1401)

- Ayutthaya Kingdom (complete list) –

Uthong dynasty
- Uthong, King (1351–1369)
- Ramesuan, King (1369–1370)
- Ramrachathirat, King (1370–1388)
Suphannaphum dynasty
- Borommarachathirat I, King (1370–1388)
- Thong Lan, King (1388)
Uthong dynasty
- Ramesuan, King (1388–1395)
- Ramrachathirat, King (1395–1409)

Vietnam

- Champa (complete list) –

- Chế Mân, King (1288–1307)
- Chế Chi, King (1307–1312)
- Chế Nang, Vassal King (to the Trần dynasty, 1312–1318)
- Chế Anan, King (1318–1342)
- Tra Hoa Bo Dê, King (1342–1360)
- Po Binasuor, King (1360–1390)
- Ko Cheng, King (1390–1400)
- Jaya Simhavarman V, King (1400–1441)

- Đại Việt: Trần dynasty (complete list) –

- Trần Anh Tông, Emperor (1293–1314)
- Trần Minh Tông, Emperor (1314–1329)
- Trần Hiến Tông, Emperor (1329–1341)
- Trần Dụ Tông, Emperor (1341–1369)
- Hôn Đức Công, Emperor (1369–1370)
- Trần Nghệ Tông, Emperor (1370–1372)
- Trần Duệ Tông, Emperor (1372–1377)
- Trần Phế Đế, Emperor (1377–1388)
- Trần Thuận Tông, Emperor (1388–1398)
- Trần Thiếu Đế, Emperor (1398–1400)

- Đại Việt: Hồ dynasty (complete list) –

- Hồ Quý Ly, Emperor (1400–1401)

=== Asia: South ===
Bengal and Northwest India

- Bengal Sultanate: Sonargaon (complete list) –

- Fakhruddin Mubarak Shah, Sultan (1338–1349)
- Ikhtiyaruddin Ghazi Shah, Sultan (1349–1352)
- Shamsuddin Ilyas Shah, Sultan (1339–1342)
- Alauddin Ali Shah, Sultan (1339–1342)
- Shamsuddin Ilyas Shah, Sultan (1342–1352)

- Bengal Sultanate: Ilyas Shahi dynasty (complete list) –

- Shamsuddin Ilyas Shah, Sultan (1352–1358)
- Sikandar Shah, Sultan (1358–1390)
- Ghiyasuddin Azam Shah, Sultan (1390–1411)

- Bengal Sultanate: Balban dynasty (complete list) –

- Nasiruddin Bughra Khan, Governor (1281–1287), Sultan (1287–1291)
- Rukunuddin Kaikaus, Sultan (1291–1300)
- Shamsuddin Firoz Shah, Sultan (1300–1322)

- Chutia Kingdom (complete list) –

- Vikramadhwajpal, King (1278–1302)
- Gauradhwajpal, King (1302–1322)
- Sankhadhwajpal, King (1322–1343)
- Mayuradhwajpal, King (1343–1361)
- Jayadhwajpal, King (1361–1383)
- Karmadhwajpal, King (1383–1401)

- Mallabhum (complete list) –

- Prithwi Malla, King (1295–1319)
- Dinabandhu Malla, King (1334–1345)
- Shiv Singh Malla, King (1370–1407)

India

- Ahmadnagar Sultanate of the Deccan (complete list) –

- Ahmad Nizam Shah I, Sultan (1490–1510)

- Alirajpur (complete list) –

- Anand Deo, Rana (1437–1440)
- Pratap Deo, Rana (1440–?)
- Chanchal Deo, Rana (?)

- Bahmani Sultanate (complete list) –

- Ala-ud-Din Bahman Mohamed bin Laden Shah, Sultan (1347–1358)
- Muhammad Shah I, Sultan (1358–1375)
- Ala ud din Mujahid Shah, Sultan (1375–1378)
- Daud Shah I, Sultan (1378)
- Muhammad Shah II, Sultan (1378–1397)
- Ghiyas ud din Tahmatan Shah, Sultan (1397)
- Shams ud din Daud Shah II, Sultan (1397)
- Taj ud-Din Firuz Shah, Sultan (1397–1422)

- Chera Perumals of Makotai (complete list) –

- Ravi Varma, King (1299–1313)
- Vira Udaya Martanda Varma, King (1313–1333)
- Aditya Varma Tiruvadi, King (1333–1335)
- Vira Rama Udaya Martanda Varma Tiruvadi, King (1335–1342)
- Vira Kerala Varma Tiruvadi, King (1342–1363)
- Vira Martanda Varma III, King (1363–1366)
- Vira Rama Martanda Varma, King (1366–1382)
- Vira Ravi Varma, King (1383–1416)

- Delhi sultanate: Tughlaq dynasty (complete list) –

- Ghiyasu-Din Tughluq I, Sultan (1321–1325)
- Muhammad Shah Tughuluq I, Sultan (1325–1351)
- Firuz Shah Tughluq, Sultan (1351–1388)
- Ghiyas-ud-Din Tughluq II, Sultan (1388–1389)
- Abu Bakr Shah, Sultan (1389–1390)
- Muhammad Shah Tughluq III, Sultan (1390–1394)
- Ala ud-din Sikandar Shah Tughluq, Sultan (1394)
- Muhammad Shah Tughuluq IV, Sultan (1394–1413)

- Farooqui dynasty (complete list) –

- Nasir Khan, Sultan (1399–1437)

- Eastern Ganga dynasty (complete list) –

- Narasimha Deva II, King (1279–1306)
- Bhanu Deva II, King (1306–1328)
- Narasimha Deva III, King (1328–1352)
- Bhanu Deva III, King (1352–1378)
- Narasimha Deva IV, King (1379–1424)

- Gujarat Sultanate (complete list) –

- Muzaffar Shah I, Sultan (1391–1403, 1404–1411)

- Hoysala Empire (complete list) –

- Veera Ballala III, King (1292–1343)

- Jaunpur Sultanate (complete list) –

- Malik Sarwar, Sultan (1394–1399)
- Malik Qaranfal, Sultan (1399–1402)

- Jawhar (complete list) –

- Jaydeorao Mukne, Raja (?–1400)
- Nemshah I, Raja (1400–1422)

- Kakatiya dynasty (complete list) –

- Prataparudra-deva, King (c.1289–1323)

- Madurai Sultanate (complete list) –

- Ahsan Khan, Sultan (1335–1339)
- Udauji, Sultan (1339)
- Feroze Khan, Sultan (1339–1340)
- Muhammad Damghani, Sultan (1340–1344)
- Mahmud Damghani, Sultan (1344–1345)
- Adil Khan, Sultan (1356–1358)
- Mubarak Khan, Sultan (1358–1368)
- Sikandar Khan, Sultan (1368–1378)

- Musunuri Nayakas (complete list) –

- Musunuri Prolaya Nayudu, King (1323–1333)
- Musunuri Kapaya Nayak, King (1333–1368)

- Pandyan dynasty (complete list) –

- Maravarman Kulasekara Pandyan I, King (1268–1308)
- Sundara Pandyan IV, King (1309–1327)
- Vira Pandyan IV, King (1309–1345)

- Paramara dynasty of Malwa (complete list) –

- Mahlakadeva, King (?–1305)

- Rajpipla (complete list) –

- Arjunsinhji, Maharana (c.1340–?)
- Bhansinhji, Maharana (14th–15th century)

- Reddi Kingdom (complete list) –

- Prolaya Vema Reddi, King (1325–1353)
- Anavota Reddi, King (1353–1364)
- Anavema Reddi, King (1364–1386)
- Kumaragiri Reddi, King (1386–1402)
- Kataya Vema Reddi, King (1395–1414)

- Seuna (Yadava) dynasty (complete list) –

- Ramachandra, King (c.1271–1308)

- Sisodia (complete list) –

- Samar Singh, Rajput (1273–1301)
- Ratan Singh, Rajput (1301–1303)
- Hammir Singh, Rajput (1326–1364)
- Kshetra Singh, Rajput (1364–1382)
- Lakha Singh, Rajput (1382–1421)

- Udaipur (complete list) –

- Hammir Singh, Maharana (1326–1364)
- Kheta, Maharana (1364–1382)
- Lakha, Maharana (1382–1421)

- Vijayanagara Empire: Sangama dynasty (complete list) –

- Harihara I, King (1336–1356)
- Bukka Raya I, King (1356–1377)
- Harihara Raya II, King (1377–1404)

Maldives

- Sultanate of the Maldives (complete list) –

Theemuge dynasty
- Davud, Sultan (1302–1307)
- Omar I, Sultan (1307–1341)
- Ahmed Shihabuddine, Sultan (1341–1347)
- Khadijah, Sultana (1347–1363)
- Mohamed el-Jameel, Sultan (1363–1364)
- Khadijah, Sultana (1364–1374)
- Abdullah I, Sultan (1374–1376)
- Khadijah, Sultana (1376–1380)
- Raadhafathi, Sultana (1380)
- Mohamed I, Sultan (1380–1385)
- Dhaain, Sultana (1385–1388)
- Abdullah II, Sultan (1388)
- Osman I, Sultan (1388)
Hilaalee dynasty
- Hassan I, Sultan (1388–1398)
- Ibrahim I, Sultan (1398)
- Hussain I, Sultan (1398–1409)

Nepal

- Khasa kingdom

- Ri'u sMal (Ripumalla), King (fl.1312–1314)
- San gha sMal (Sangramamalla), King (early 14th century)
- Ajitamalla, King (1321–1328)
- Kalyanamalla, King (14th century)
- Pratapamalla, King (14th century)
- Pu ni sMal (Punyamalla), King (fl.1336–1339)
- sPri ti sMal (Prthivimalla), King (fl.1354–1358)

- Malla (complete list) –

- Ananta Malla, Raja (c.1274–1310)
- Jayananada Deva, Raja (c.1310–1320)
- Jayari Malla, Raja (c.1320–1344)
- Jayarudra Malla, Raja (c.1320–1326)
- Jayaraja Deva, Raja (c.1347–1361)
- Jayarjuna Malla, Raja (c.1361–1382)
- Jayasthiti Malla, Raja (c.1382–1395)
- Jayajyotir Malla, Raja (c.1395–1428)
- Jayakiti Malla, Raja (c.1395–1403)
- Jayadharma Malla, Raja (c.1395–1408)

Pakistan

- Samma dynasty (complete list) –

- Unar, Jam (1336–1339)
- Junan, Jam (1339–1352)
- Banhabina, Jam (1352–1367)
- Tamachi, Jam (1367–1379)
- Salahuddin, Jam (1379–1389)
- Nizamuddin I, Jam (1389–1391)
- Ali Sher, Jam (1391–1398)
- Karn, Jam (1398)
- Fath Khan, Jam (1398–1414)

Sri Lanka

- Kingdom of Dambadeniya (complete list) –

- Parakkamabahu III, King (1302–1310)
- Bhuvanaikabahu II, King (1310–1325/6)
- Parakkamabahu IV, King (1325/6–1325/6)
- Bhuvanaikabahu III, King (1325/6–1325/6)
- Vijayabahu V, King (1325/6–1344/5)

- Kingdom of Gampola (complete list) –

- Bhuvanaikabahu IV, King (1344/5–1353/4)
- Parakkamabahu V, King (1344/5–1359)
- Vikramabahu III, King (1357–1374)
- Bhuvanaikabahu V, King (1372/3–1391/2)
- Vira Bahu II, King (1391/2–1397)
- unnamed son of Vira Bahu II, King (1397)
- unnamed son of Vira Bahu II, King (1397)
- Vira Alakesvara, King (1397–1409)

- Jaffna Kingdom (complete list) –

- Vickrama Cinkaiariyan, King (1292–1302)
- Varodaya Cinkaiariyan, King (1302–1325)
- Martanda Cinkaiariyan, King (1325–1347)
- Gunabhooshana Cinkaiariyan, King (1347–1371)
- Virodaya Cinkaiariyan, King (1371–1380)
- Jeyaveera Cinkaiariyan, King (1380–1410)

=== Asia: West ===
Turkey

- Ottoman Empire (complete list) –

- Osman I, Sultan (c.1299–1326)
- Orhan, Sultan (1323/4–1362)
- Murad I, Sultan (1362–1389)
- Bayezid I, Sultan (1389–1402)

Yemen

- Kathiri State of Seiyun –

- Badr as-Sahab ibn al-Habrali Bu Tuwairik, Sultan (1395–1430)

- Yemeni Zaidi State (complete list) –

- al-Mahdi Muhammad bin al-Mutahhar, Imam (1301–1328)
- al-Mu'ayyad Yahya, Imam (1328–1346)
- an-Nasir Ali bin Salah, Imam (1328–1329)
- Ahmad bin Ali al-Fathi, Imam (1329–1349)
- al-Wathiq al-Mutahhar, Imam (1349)
- al-Mahdi Ali bin Muhammad, Imam (1349–1372)
- al-Nasir Muhammad Salah al-Din, Imam (1372–1391)
- al-Mansur Ali bin Salah ad-Din, Imam (1391–1436)
- al-Hadi Ali, Imam (1393–1432)

== Europe ==
=== Europe: Balkans ===
Achaea

- Principality of Achaea (complete list) –

- Isabella, Princess (1289–1307)
- Philip I, Prince (1301–1307)
- Philip II, Prince (1307–1313)
- Matilda, Princess (1313–1322) and Louis I, Prince (1313–1316)
- John, Prince (1322–1332)
- Robert, Prince (1332–1364)
- Philip III, Prince (1364–1373)
- Joan I, Princess (1373–1381)
- James, Prince (1380–1383)
- Charles III, Prince (1383–1386)
- Pedro de San Superano, Prince (1396–1402)

Archipelago

- Duchy of the Archipelago (complete list) –

- Marco II, Duke (1262–1303)
- Guglielmo I, Duke (1303–1323)
- Niccolò I, Duke (1323–1341)
- Giovanni I, Duke (1341–1362)
- Florence Sanudo, Duchess (1362–1371)
- Nicholas II, Duke (1364–1371)
- Nicholas III dalle Carceri, Duke (1371–1383)
- Francesco I, Duke (1383–1397)
- Giacomo I, Duke (1397–1418)

Bulgaria

- Second Bulgarian Empire (complete list) –

- Theodore Svetoslav, Emperor (1300–1322)
- George Terter II, Emperor (1322–1323)
- Michael Shishman, Emperor (1323–1330)
- Ivan Stephen, Emperor (1330–1331)
- Ivan Alexander, Emperor (1331–1371)
- Ivan Sratsimir, co-Emperor (1356–1396)
- Ivan Shishman, co-Emperor (1371–1395)

Byzantium

- Byzantine Empire (complete list) –

- Michael IX Palaiologos, co-Emperor (1294–1320)
- Andronikos III Palaiologos, Emperor (1321–1341)
- John V Palaiologos, Emperor (1341–1376, 1379–1390, 1390–1391)
- John VI Kantakouzenos, co-Emperor (1347–1353)
- Matthew Kantakouzenos, co-Emperor (1353–1357)
- Andronikos IV Palaiologos, Emperor (1376–1379)
- John VII Palaiologos, Emperor (1390)
- Manuel II Palaiologos, Emperor (1391–1425)

Croatia

- Republic of Ragusa (complete list) –

- Nicola Sorgo, Rector (1358–?)
- Marco Bobali three time Rector, Rector (1370–1390)

Morea

- Despotate of the Morea (complete list) –

- Manuel Kantakouzenos, Despot (1349–1380)
- Matthew Kantakouzenos, Despot (1380–1383)
- Demetrios I Kantakouzenos, Despot (1383)
- Theodore I Palaiologos, Despot (1383–1407)

Serbia

- Kingdom of Serbia / Serbian Empire (complete list) –

- Stefan Milutin, King (1282–1321)
- Stefan Konstantin, King (1321–1322)
- Stefan Dečanski, King (1322–1331)
- Stefan Dušan, King (1331–1346), Emperor (1346–1355)
- Stefan Uroš V King (1346–1355), Emperor (1355–1371)
- Vukašin King (1365–1371)

- Kingdom of Syrmia (complete list) –

- Stefan Dragutin, King of Serbia (1276–1282), King of Syrmia (1282–1316)
- Vladislav, King (1316–1325)

- Moravian Serbia (complete list) –

- Lazar, Prince (1374–1379)
- Stefan Lazarević, Prince (1389–1402), Despot (1402–1427)

Rhodes

- Hospitaller Rhodes: Knights Hospitaller (complete list) –

- Foulques de Villaret, Grand Master (1305–1319)
- Maurice de Pagnac, unrecognized Grand Master (1317–1319)
- Hélion de Villeneuve, Grand Master (1319–1346)
- Dieudonné de Gozon, Grand Master (1346–1353)
- Pierre de Corneillan, Grand Master (1353–1355)
- Roger de Pins, Grand Master (1355–1365)
- Raymond Berengar, Grand Master (1365–1374)
- Robert de Juilly, Grand Master (1374–1376)
- Juan Fernández de Heredia, Grand Master (1376–1396)
- Riccardo Caracciolo, Grand Master (1383–1395)
- Philibert de Naillac, Grand Master (1396–1421)

=== Europe: Britain and Ireland ===
Scotland

- Kingdom of Scotland (complete list) –

- Robert I, King (1306–1329)
- David II, King (1329–1371)
- Robert II, King (1371–1390)
- Robert III, King (1390–1406)

England and Ireland

- Kingdom of England and Lordship of Ireland (complete list) –

- Edward I, King and Lord (1272–1307)
- Edward II, King and Lord (1307–1327)
- Edward III, King and Lord (1327–1377)
- Richard II, King and Lord (1377–1399)
- Henry IV, King and Lord (1399–1413)

Ireland

- Airgíalla (complete list) –

- Brian mac Eochada, King (1283–1311)
- Ralph/Roolb mac Eochada, King (1311–1314)
- Mael Sechlainn mac Eochada, King (1314–?)
- Murchad Mór mac Briain, King (?–1331)
- Seoan mac Maoilsheachlainn, King (1331–1342)
- Aodh mac Roolb, King (1342–1344)
- Murchadh Óg mac Murchada, King (1344–1344)
- Maghnus mac Eochadha, King (1344–1357)
- Pilib mac Rooilbh, King (1357–1362)
- Brian Mór mac Aodh, King (1362–1365)
- Niall mac Murchadha, King (1365–1368)
- Brian Mór mac Aodh, King (1368–1371)
- Pilib Ruadh mac Briain, King (1371–1403)

- East Breifne (complete list) –

- Gilla-Isa Ruaid O'Raigillig, ruler (1327/30)
- Matha son of Gilla-Isa O'Raigillig, ruler (1304)
- Mael Sechlainn O'Raigillig, ruler (1328)
- Richard [Risderd] O'Reilly, ruler (1349–1346/49)
- Cu Chonnacht O'Reilly, ruler (1362/65)
- Philip O'Reilly, ruler (1365–1366/69)
- Magnus O'Reilly, ruler (1366/69–1366/69)
- Philip O'Reilly, ruler (1366/69–1384)
- Thomas, King (1384–1390)
- John, ruler (1390–1400)
- Gilla-Isa, ruler (1400)

- West Breifne (complete list) –

- Amlaib Ó Ruairc, King (c.1275–1307)
- Domnall Carrach Ó Ruairc, King (1307–1311)
- Ualgarg Mór Ó Ruairc, King (1316–1346)
- Flaithbheartach Ó Ruairc, King (1346–1349)
- Aodh Bán Ó Ruairc, King (1349–1352)
- Flaithbheartach Ó Ruairc, King (1352–1352)
- Tadhg na gCaor Ó Ruairc, King (1352–1376)
- Gilla Crist Ó Ruairc, Lord (?–1378)
- Tigernán mór Ó Ruairc, King (1376–1418)

- Connachta (complete list) –

- Aedh Ó Conchobair, King (1293–1309)

- Leinster (complete list) –

- Muiris mac Muirchertach mac Murchada Caomhánach, King (1282–1314)
- Art mac Murchada Caomhánach, King (1314–1323)
- Domhnall mac Art mac Murchada Caomhánach, King (1323–1338)
- Domhnall mac Domhnall mac Murchada Caomhánach, King (1338–1347)
- Muirchertach mac Muiris mac Murchada Caomhánach, King (1347–1354)
- Art Mór mac Murchada Caomhánach, King (1354–1362)
- Diarmait mac Murchada Caomhánach, King (1362–1369)
- Donnchadh mac Muirchertach mac Murchada Caomhánach, King (1369–1375)
- Art Mór mac Murchadha Caomhánach, King (1369–1375)
- Art Óg mac Murchadha Caomhánach, King (1375–1417)

- Magh Luirg (complete list) –

- Maelruanaidh mac Diarmata, King (1294–1331)
- Tomaltach gCear mac Diarmata, King (1331–1336)
- Conchobhair mac Diarmata, King (1336–1343)
- Ferghal mac Diarmata, King (1343–1368)
- Aedh mac Diarmata, King (1368–1393)
- Maelruanaidh mac Diarmata, King (1393–1398)
- Conchobair Óg mac Diarmata, King (1398–1404)

- Síol Anmchadha (complete list) –

- Murchadh Ó Madadhan, Lord (1286–1327)
- Eoghan Ó Madadhan, Lord (1327–1347)
- Murchadh Ó Madadhain, Lord (1347–1371)
- Eoghan Mór Ó Madadhan, Lord (1371–1410)

=== Europe: Central ===
See also List of state leaders in the 14th-century Holy Roman Empire

- Holy Roman Empire, Kingdom of Germany (complete list, complete list) –

- Albert I, King (1298–1308)
- Henry VII, Holy Roman Emperor (1312–1313), King (1308–1313)
- Frederick the Fair, King (1314–1330)
- Louis IV, Holy Roman Emperor (1328–1347), King (1314–1347)
- Charles IV, Holy Roman Emperor (1355–1378), King (1346–1378)
- Wenceslaus, King (1376–1400)
- Rupert, King (1400–1410)

Hungary

- Kingdom of Hungary (1301–1526) (complete list) –

- Andrew III, King (1290–1301)
- Wenceslaus, King (1301–1305)
- Otto, King (1305–1307)
- Charles I, King (1308–1342)
- Louis I, King (1342–1382)
- Mary I, Queen (1382–1385, 1386–1395)
- Charles II, King (1385–1386)
- Sigismund, King (1387–1437)

Poland

- Kingdom of Poland (complete list) –

- Przemysł II, High Duke (1290–1291), King (1295–1296)
- Wenceslaus II, High Duke (1291–1300), King (1300–1305)
- Wenceslaus III, King (1305–1306)
- Władysław I the Elbow-high, King (1320–1333)
- Casimir III the Great, King (1333–1370)
- Louis I the Hungarian, King (1370–1382)
- Jadwiga, Queen (1384–1399)
- Władysław II Jagiełło, King (1386–1434)

- Duchy of Opole (complete list) –

- Bolko I, Duke (1281–1313)
- Albert, co-Duke (1313–1323)
- Bolko II, Duke (1313–1356)
- Henry, co-Duke (1356–1365)
- Bolko III co-Duke (1356–1370)
- Władysław II, Duke (1356–1401)
- Bernard, co-Duke (1396–1400)
- Bolko IV, Duke (1396–1437)

- Duchy of Masovia (complete list) –

- Bolesław II, Duke of Płock (1275–1294), Duke of Masovia (1294–1313)
- Siemowit III, co-Duke of Warsaw (1341–1349), of Rawa (1345–1349), Duke of Warsaw (1349–1355), of Masovia (1355–1381)

- Duchy of Masovia: Warsaw (complete list) –

- Trojden I, Duke of Czersk (1310–1313), Duke of Warsaw (1313–1341)
- Casimir I, co-Duke of Warsaw (1341–1349), co-Duke of Rawa (1345–1349), Duke of Rawa (1349–1355)
- Siemowit III, co-Duke of Warsaw (1341–1349), of Rawa (1345–1349), Duke of Warsaw (1349–1355), of Masovia (1355–1381)
- Janusz I the Elder, Duke (1381–1429)

- Duchy of Masovia: Płock (complete list) –

- Wenceslaus I, Duke (1313–1336)
- Siemowit II, Regent (1336–1340)
- Trojden I, Regent (1336–1340)
- Bolesław III, Duke (1336–1351)
- Siemowit IV the Younger, Duke of Płock and Rawa (1381–1426)

- Duchy of Masovia: Rawa (complete list) –

- Siemowit II, Duke of Rawa (1313–1345)
- Casimir I, co-Duke of Warsaw (1341–1349), co-Duke of Rawa (1345–1349), Duke of Rawa (1349–1355)
- Siemowit III, co-Duke of Warsaw (1341–1349), co-Duke of Rawa (1345–1349), Duke of Warsaw (1349–1355), Duke of Masovia (1355–1381)
- Siemowit IV the Younger, Duke of Płock and Rawa (1381–1426)

- State of the Teutonic Order (complete list) –

- Gottfried von Hohenlohe, Grand Master (1297–1303)
- Siegfried von Feuchtwangen, Grand Master (1303–1311)
- Karl von Trier, Grand Master (1311–1324)
- Werner von Orseln, Grand Master (1324–1330)
- Luther von Braunschweig (Lothar), Grand Master (1331–1335)
- Dietrich von Altenburg, Grand Master (1335–1341)
- Ludolf König von Wattzau, Grand Master (1342–1345)
- Heinrich Dusemer, Grand Master (1345–1351)
- Winrich von Kniprode, Grand Master (1351–1382)
- Konrad Zöllner von Rotenstein, Grand Master (1382–1390)
- Konrad von Wallenrode, Grand Master (1391–1393)
- Konrad von Jungingen, Grand Master (1393–1407)

=== Europe: East ===
- Blue Horde (complete list) –

- Köchü, Khan (1280–1302)
- Buyan, Khan (1302–1309)
- Sasibuqa, Khan (1309/1310–1315)
- Ilbasan, Khan (1310/15–1320)
- Mubarak Khwaja, Khan (1320–1344)
- Chimtay, Khan (1344–1360)
- Urus, Khan (1372–1374)
- Toqtaqiya, Khan (1377)
- Timur-Malik, Khan (1377–1378)

- Grand Duchy of Lithuania (complete list) –

- Vytenis, Grand Duke (1295–1316)
- Gediminas, Grand Duke (1316–1341)
- Jaunutis, Grand Duke (1341–1345)
- Algirdas, Grand Duke (1345–1377) (Diarchy with Kestutis)
- Jogalia Algirdaitis, Grand Duke (1377–1381) (Diarchy with Kestutis)
- Kestutis, Grand Duke (1381–1382)
- Jogalia Algirdaitis, Grand Duke (1382–1434)
- Skirgaila, Grand Duke (regent) (1386–1392)

- Moldavia (complete list) –

- Dragoș, Voivode (c.1347–c.1354)
- Sas, Voivode (c.1354–c.1363)
- Balc of Moldavia, Voivode (1359/64)
- Bogdan I the Founder, Voivode (c.1359–1367)
- Petru I, Voivode (1367–1368)
- Lațcu, Voivode (1368–1375)
- Petru II Mușat, Voivode (1375–1391)
- Roman I, Voivode (1391–1394)
- Ștefan I, Voivode (1394–1399)
- Iuga, Voivode (1399–1400)
- Alexandru I the Good, Voivode (1400–1432)

- Grand Duchy of Moscow (complete list) –

- Daniel of Moscow, Grand prince (1283–1303)
- Yury, Grand prince (1303–1325)
- Ivan I, Grand prince (1332–1340)
- Simeon the Proud, Grand prince (1340–1353)
- Ivan II, Grand prince (1353–1359)
- Dmitry Donskoy, Grand prince (1359–1389)
- Vasily I, Grand prince (1389–1425)

- Vladimir-Suzdal (complete list) –

- Andrey III, Grand Duke (1281–1283, 1293–1304)
- Michael of Tver, Grand Duke (1304–1318)
- Yuri (III) of Moscow, Grand Duke (1318–1322)
- Dmitry I, Grand Duke (1322–1326)
- Alexander of Tver, Grand Duke (1326–1327)
- Alexander III, Grand Duke (1328–1331)
- Ivan I of Moscow, Grand Duke (1332–1340)

- Principality of Wallachia (complete list) –

- Radu Negru, Prince (c.1290–1310)
- Basarab I the Founder, Prince (c.1310–1352)
- Nicolae Alexandru, Prince (1352–1364)
- Vladislav I, Prince (c.1364–1377)
- Radu I, Prince (c.1377–1383)
- Dan I, Prince (c.1383–1386)
- Mircea I the Elder, Prince (1386–1394, 1397–1418)
- Vlad I the Usurper, Prince (1394–1397)

=== Europe: Nordic ===
Denmark

- Denmark (complete list) –

- Eric VI, King (1286–1319)
- Christopher II, King (1320–1326, 1329–1332) / Eric Christoffersen, co-King (1321–1326, 1329–1331/1332)
- Valdemar III, King (1326–1329)
- Vacant between 2 August 1332 until 21 June 1340, when Denmark was mortgaged to a few German counts.
- Valdemar IV, King (1340–1375)
Personal union of Denmark and Norway
- Olaf II of Denmark, Olaf IV of Norway, King (1380–1387)

- Duchy of Schleswig (complete list) –

- Valdemar IV, Duke of Schleswig, Duke (1283–1312)
- Eric II, Duke of Schleswig, Duke (1312–1325)
- Valdemar III of Denmark, Duke (1325–1326, 1330–1364)
- Gerhard III, Count of Holstein-Rendsburg, Duke (1326–1330)
- Henry, Duke of Schleswig, Duke (1364–1375)
- Henry II, Count of Holstein-Rendsburg, Duke (1375–1381/1384)
- Nicholas, Count of Holstein-Rendsburg, Duke (1375–1386)
- Gerhard VI, Count of Holstein-Rendsburg, Duke (1386–1404)

Norway

- Kingdom of Norway (872–1397) (complete list) –

- Haakon V, King (1299–1319)
- Magnus IV of Sweden, Magnus VII of Norway, King (1319–1343)
- Haakon VI, King (1343–1380)
Personal union of Denmark and Norway
- Olaf II of Denmark, Olaf IV of Norway, King (1380–1387)

Sweden

- Sweden (800–1521) (complete list) –

- Birger, King (1290–1318)
- Ingeborg of Norway, Regent (1318–1319)
- Magnus IV, King (1318–1364)
- Eric XII, King (1356–1359)
- Haakon, King (1362–1364)
- Albert, King (1364–1389)

Kalmar Union

- Kalmar Union of Denmark, Sweden, and Norway (complete list, complete list, complete list) –

- Margaret I, Queen Regent of Denmark (1387–1412), of Norway (1388–1412), of Sweden (1389–1412)
- Eric of Pomerania, King (1389–1442)

=== Europe: Southcentral ===
See also List of state leaders in the 14th-century Holy Roman Empire#Italy

- Kingdom of Italy (Holy Roman Empire) (complete list) –

- Henry VII, King (1311–1313)
- Louis IV, King (1327–1347)
- Charles IV, King (1355–1378)

- Margraviate of Modena, Reggio, and Ferrara (complete list) –

- Azzo VIII, Marquis of Reggio (1293–1306), of Ferrara (1293–1308)
- Aldobrandino II, Marquis of Modena (1293–1308), of Ferrara (1308–1326)
- Fresco, Marquis of Ferrara (1308)
- Rinaldo, Marquis of Ferrara (1317–1335)
- Niccolò I, Marquis of Ferrara (1317–1344), of Modena (1336–1344)
- Obizzo III, Marquis of Ferrara (1317–1352), of Modena (1336–1352)
- Azzo IX, Marquis of Ferrara (1317–1318)
- Bertoldo I, Marquis of Ferrara (1317–1343)
- Aldobrandino III, Marquis of Ferrara (1352–1361)
- Niccolò II the Lame, Marquis of Modena (1352–1388), of Ferrara (1361–1388)
- Alberto V, Marquis of Ferrara (1361–1393), of Modena (1388–1393)
- Niccolò III, Marquis of Ferrara and Modena (1393–1441), of Reggio (1405–1441)

- March of Montferrat (complete list) –

- John I, Marquis (1292–1305)
- Theodore I, Marquis (1306–1338)
- John II, Marquis (1338–1372)
- Secondotto (Otto III), Marquis (1372–1378)
- John III, Marquis (1378–1381)
- Theodore II, Marquis (1381–1418)

- Papal States (complete list) –

- Boniface VIII, Pope (1294–1303)
- Benedict XI, Pope (1303–1304)
- Clement V, Pope (1305–1314)
- John XXII, Pope (1316–1334)
- Benedict XII, Pope (1334–1342)
- Clement VI, Pope (1342–1352)
- Innocent VI, Pope (1352–1362)
- Urban V, Pope (1362–1370)
- Gregory XI, Pope (1370–1378)
- Urban VI, Pope (1378–1389)
- Boniface IX, Pope (1389–1404)

From 1309 to 1376 the Papacy was based at Avignon, not Rome.

- San Marino

- Captains Regent (1243–1500) –

- Giovanni di Causetta Giannini, Captain Regent (1302)
- Arimino Baracone, Simone da Sterpeto, Captains Regent (1303)
- Venturuccio di Giannuccio, Captain Regent (1321)
- Giovanni di Causetta Giannini, Ugolino Fornaro, Captains Regent (1323)
- Ser Bonanni Notaio, Mule Acatolli di Piandavello, Captains Regent (1325)
- Ugucciolo da Valdragone, Captain Regent (1331)
- Venturuzzo di Franceschino, Muzolo da Bauti, Captains Regent (1336)
- Bentivegna da Valle, Foschino di Novello, Captains Regent (1337–1338)
- Denaro Madroni, Fosco Raffanelli, Captains Regent (1338–1339)
- Ricevuto, Gioagnolo di Acaptolo, Captains Regent (1339)
- Bentivegna, Zanutino, Captains Regent (1341)
- Ricevuto di Ughetto, Foschino di Filipuccio, Captains Regent (1342–1343)
- Franzolino di Chillo, Cecco di Chillo, Captains Regent (1343)
- Foschino Calcigni, Captain Regent (1347)
- Francesco Pistorj, Ciapetta di Novello, Captains Regent (1351)
- Giovanni di Guiduccio, Nino di Simonino, Captains Regent (1353)
- Gioagnolo di Acaptolo, Paolo di Ceccolo, Captains Regent (1356)
- Giovanni di Guiduccio, Foschino Calcigni, Captains Regent (1357)
- Giovanni di Bianco, Captain Regent (1357)
- Giovanni di Guiduccio, Corbello di Vita, Captains Regent (1359–1360)
- Ciapetta di Novello, Nino di Simonino, Captains Regent (1360)
- Foschino Calcigni, Giovanni di Bianco, Captains Regent (1360)
- Guidino di Giovanni, Giovanni di Guiduccio, Captains Regent (1362–1363)
- Giovanni di Bianco, Nino di Simonino, Captains Regent (1363)
- Guidino di Giovanni, Cecco di Chillo, Captains Regent (1364)
- Foschino Calcigni, Corbello Giannini, Captains Regent (1364)
- Gioagnolo di Acaptolo, Ugolino di Giovanni Vanioli, Captains Regent (1365–1366)
- Nicolino di Ariminuccio, Vanne di Nomaiolo, Captains Regent (1366)
- Bartolino di Giovanni di Bianco, Nino di Simonino, Captains Regent (1366–1367)
- Guidino di Giovanni, Paolo di Ceccolo, Captains Regent (1367)
- Gioagnolo di Ugolinuccio, Ghino Fabbro, Captains Regent (1367–1368)
- Muciolino di Ciolo, Giovanni di Riguccio, Captains Regent (1368)
- Orbello di Vita Giannini, Ugolino di Giovanni Vanioli, Captains Regent (1368–1369)
- Mignone Bauto, Lunardino di Bernardo Fabbro, Captains Regent (1369)
- Gioagnolo di Ugolinuccio, Giovanni di Riguccio, Captains Regent (1369–1370)
- Ciappetta di Novello, Ugolino di Giovanni, Captains Regent (1370)
- Guidino di Giovanni, Paolo di Ceccolo, Captains Regent (1370–1371)
- Nino di Simonino, Maxio di Tonso Alberghetti, Captains Regent (1371)
- Mucciolino di Ciolo, Bartolino di Giovanni di Bianco, Captains Regent (1371–1372)
- Corbello di Vita Giannini, Mignone Bauto, Captains Regent (1372)
- Giovanni di Riguccio, Martino di Guerolo Pistorj, Captains Regent (1372–1373)
- Ugolino di Giovanni, Lunardino di Bernardo, Captains Regent (1373)
- Paolo di Ceccolo, Antonio di Mula, Captains Regent (1373–1374)
- Andrea di Nanne, Guidino di Giovanni, Captains Regent (1374)
- Giovanni di Riguccio, Gozio di Mucciolino, Captains Regent (1374–1375)
- Ugolino di Giovanni, Paolino di Giovanni di Bianco, Captains Regent (1375)
- Lunardino di Bernardo, Simone di Belluzzo, Captains Regent (1378)
- Gozio di Mucciolino, Ondedeo di Tonso, Captains Regent (1378–1379)
- Paolo di Ceccolo, Bartolino di Antonio, Captains Regent (1380–1381)
- Lunardino di Bernardo, Samperino di Giovanni, Captains Regent (1381)
- Maxio di Tonso, Niccolò di Giove, Captains Regent (1381–1382)
- Ugolino di Giovanni, Giovanni di Andrea, Captains Regent (1382)
- Giangio di Ceccolo, Bernardo di Guerolo, Captains Regent (1382–1383)
- Paolino di Giovanni di Bianco, Guidino di Foschino, Captains Regent (1383)
- Lunardino di Bernardo, Giannino di Cavalluccio, Captains Regent (1383–1384)
- Samperino di Giovanni, Martino di Guerolo de' Pistorj, Captains Regent (1384)
- Paolo di Ceccolo, Benetino di Fosco, Captains Regent (1384–1385)
- Giovanni di Francesco, Gozio di Mucciolino, Captains Regent (1386)
- Gozio di Mucciolino, Bartolino di Antonio, Captains Regent (1390–1391)
- Giovanni di Francesco, Menguccio di Simonino, Captains Regent (1391)
- Maxio di Tonso, Lunardino di Bernardo, Captains Regent (1391–1392)
- Paolo di Ceccolo, Simone di Belluzzo, Captains Regent (1392)
- Samperino di Giovanni, Giannino di Cavalluccio, Captains Regent (1392–1393)
- Gozio di Mucciolino, Antonio Tegna, Captains Regent (1393)
- Bartolino di Antonio, Nicolò di Giove, Captains Regent (1393–1394)
- Lunardino di Bernardo, Martino di Guerolo de' Pistorj, Captains Regent (1394)
- Ugolino di Giovanni, Cecco di Alessandro, Captains Regent (1394–1395)
- Vita di Corbello, Giovanni di Andrea, Captains Regent (1395)
- Simone di Belluzzo, Rigone di Giovanni, Captains Regent (1395–1396)
- Samperino di Giovanni, Giovanni di Francesco, Captains Regent (1396)
- Paolino di Giovanni di Bianco, Giovanni di Pasino, Captains Regent (1396–1397)
- Bartolino di Antonio, Giacomino di Paolo, Captains Regent (1397)
- Nicolò di Giove, Marino di Ghino Fabbro, Captains Regent (1397–1398)
- Marino di Fosco, Giovanni di Andrea, Captains Regent (1398)
- Gozio di Mucciolino, Rigone di Giovanni, Captains Regent (1398–1399)
- Giovanni di Guidino, Simone di Belluzzo, Captains Regent (1399)
- Martino di Guerolo de' Pistorj, Antonio di Tegna, Captains Regent (1399–1400)
- Paolino di Giovanni di Bianco, Francesco di Corbello, Captains Regent (1400)
- Ugolino di Giovanni, Betto di Guerolo, Captains Regent (1400–1401)

- Republic of Venice (complete list) –

- Pietro Gradenigo, Doge (1289–1311)
- Marino Zorzi, Doge (1311–1312)
- Giovanni Soranzo, Doge (1312–1328)
- Francesco Dandolo, Doge (1328–1339)
- Bartolomeo Gradenigo, Doge (1339–1342)
- Andrea Dandolo, Doge (1342–1354)
- Marino Faliero, Doge (1354–1355)
- Giovanni Gradenigo, Doge (1355–1356)
- Giovanni Dolfin, Doge (1356–1361)
- Lorenzo Celsi, Doge (1361–1365)
- Marco Cornaro, Doge (1365–1367)
- Andrea Contarini, Doge (1367–1382)
- Michele Morosini, Doge (1382–1382)
- Antonio Venier, Doge (1382–1400)
- Michele Steno, Doge (1400–1413)

Southern Italy

- Kingdom of Naples (complete list) –

- Charles II the Lame, King (1285–1309)
- Robert I the Wise, King (1309–1343)
- Joanna I, Queen (1343–1382)
- Louis I, King (1348–1362)
- Charles III the Short, King (1382–1386)
- Ladislaus I the Magnanimous, King (1386–1390)
- Louis I of Anjou, King (1382–1384)
- Louis II, King (1389–1399)

- Kingdom of Trinacria: Sicily (complete list) –

- Frederick II, King (1295–1337)
- Peter II, King (1337–1342)
- Louis, King (1342–1355)
- Frederick III, King (1355–1377)
- Maria, Queen (1377–1401)

- Principality of Taranto (complete list) –

- Philip I, Prince (1294–1331)
- Robert, Prince (1331–1346)
- Louis, Prince (1346–1364)
- Philip II, Prince (1364–1374)
- Philip III, Prince (1356–?)
- James of Baux, Prince (1374–1383)
- Otto, Prince (1383–1393)
- Raimondo del Balzo Orsini, Prince (1393–1406)

=== Europe: Southwest ===
Iberian Peninsula

- Crown of Aragon (complete list) –

- James II, King (1291–1327)
- Alfonso IV, King (1327–1336)
- Peter IV, King (1336–1387)
- John I, King (1387–1396)
- Martin, King (1396–1410)

- Crown of Castile (complete list) –

- Ferdinand IV the Summoned, King (1295–1312)
- Alfonso XI the Just, King (1312–1350)
- Peter the Cruel, King (1350–1369)
- Henry II the Bastard, King (1369–1379)
- John I, King (1379–1390)
- Henry III the Infirm, King (1390–1406)

- County of Barcelona (complete list) –

- James II, Count (1291–1327)
- Alphonse III, Count (1327–1336)
- Peter III, Count (1336–1387)
- John I, Count (1387–1396)
- Martin the Humanist, Count (1396–1410)

- Emirate of Granada

- Muhammad II (1273–1302)
- Muhammad III (1302–1309)
- Nasr (1309–1314)
- Ismail I (1314–1325)
- Muhammad IV (1325–1333)
- Yusuf I (1333–1354)
- Muhammad V (1354–1359)
- Ismail II (1359–1360)
- Muhammad VI (1360–1362)
- Muhammad V (1362–1391; second time)
- Yusuf II (1391–1392)
- Muhammad VII (1392–1408)

- Kingdom of Navarre (complete list) –

- Joan I, Queen (1274–1305)
- Philip I, King (1284–1305)
- Louis I, King (1305–1316)
- John I, King (1316)
- Philip II, King (1316–1322)
- Charles I, King (1322–1328)
- Joan II, Queen (1328–1349)
- Philip III, King (1328–1343)
- Charles II, King (1349–1387)
- Charles III, King (1387–1425)

- Kingdom of Portugal (complete list) –

- Denis I, King (1279–1325)
- Afonso IV, King (1325–1357)
- Peter I, King (1357–1367)
- Ferdinand I, King (1367–1383)
- John I, King (1385–1433)

- County of Ribagorza (complete list) –

- Peter, Count (1322–1381)
- Alfonso I, Count (1365–1412)

Marca Hispanica

- Andorra

- Episcopal Co-Princes (complete list) –

- Guillem de Montcada, Episcopal Co-Prince (1295–1308)
- Ramon Trebaylla, Episcopal Co-Prince (1308–1326)
- Arnau de Llordat, Episcopal Co-Prince (1326–1341)
- Pere de Narbona, Episcopal Co-Prince (1341–1348)
- Niccoló Capocci, Episcopal Co-Prince (1348–1351)
- Hug Desbac, Episcopal Co-Prince (1351–1361)
- Guillem Arnau i Palau, Episcopal Co-Prince (1361–1364)
- Pedro Martínez Luna, Episcopal Co-Prince (1364–1370)
- Berenguer d'Erill i de Pallars, Episcopal Co-Prince (1370–1387)
- Galcerand de Vilanova, Episcopal Co-Prince (1387–1415)

- French Co-Princes (complete list) –

- Roger-Bernard III, French Co-Prince (1278–1302)
- Gaston I, French Co-Prince (1302–1315)
- Gaston II, French Co-Prince (1315–1343)
- Gaston III Phoebus, French Co-Prince (1343–1391)
- Matthew, French Co-Prince (1391–1398)
- Isabella, French Co-Princess (1398–1413)

- County of Osona (complete list) –

- Bernard III of Cabrera, Count (1356–1364)

- County of Cerdanya (complete list) –

- James II, Count (1276–1311)
- Sancho II, Count (1311–1324)
- James III, Count (1324–1349)
- James IV, Count (1349–1375)
- Isabella, Count (1375–1403)

- County of Urgell (complete list) –

- Ermengol X, Count (1268–1314)
- Alfonso IV of Aragon, Count (1314–1327)
- James I of Urgell, Count (1327–1347)
- Peter II of Urgell, Count (1347–1408)

=== Europe: West ===
France

- Kingdom of France (complete list) –

- Philip IV, King (1285–1314)
- Louis X the Quarreller, King (1314–1316)
- John I the Posthumous, King (1316–1316)
- Philip V the Tall, King (1316–1322)
- Charles IV the Fair, King (1322–1328)
- Philip VI, King (1328–1350)
- John II the Good, King (1350–1364)
- Charles V the Wise, King (1364–1380)
- Charles VI, King (1380–1422)

- Anjou (complete list) –

- Philip, Count (1293–1328)
- John, Count (1332–1350)
- Louis I, Duke (1339–1383)
- Louis II, Duke (1377–1417)

- Duchy of Aquitaine (complete list) –

- Edward I Longshanks, Duke (1272–1307)
- Edward II, Duke (1307–1325)
- Edward III, Duke (1325–1362)

- County of Artois (complete list) –

- Robert II, Count (1250–1302)
- Matilda, Countess (1302–1329)
- Robert III, contested Count (1302–1329)
- Joan I, Countess (1329–1330)
- Joan II, Countess, and Odo, Count (1330–1347)
- Philip I, Duke of Burgundy, Count (1347–1361)
- Margaret I, Countess (1361–1382)
- Louis III, Count (1382–1383)
- Margaret II, Countess (1383–1405)

- Auvergne (complete list) –

- Robert VI, count of Auvergne, Count (1279–1317)
- Robert VII, count of Auvergne, Count (1317–1325)
- William XII of Auvergne, Count (1325–1332)
- Joan I, Countess of Auvergne, Countess (1332–1360)
- Philip of Burgundy, Count (1338–1346)
- John II of France, Count (1350–1360)
- Philip I, Count (1360–1361)
- John I, count of Auvergne, Count (1361–1386)
- John II, count of Auvergne, Count (1386–1394)
- Joan II, Countess of Auvergne, Countess (1394–1422)
- John, Duke of Berry, Count (1394–1416)

- Avignon Papacy –

- Clement V, Pope (1305–1314)
- John XXII, Pope (1316–1334)
- Benedict XII, Pope (1334–1342)
- Clement VI, Pope (1342–1352)
- Innocent VI, Pope (1352–1362)
- Urban V, Pope (1362–1370)
- Gregory XI, Pope (1370–1378)
- Clement VII, Antipope (1378–1394)
- Benedict XIII, Antipope (1394–1423; expelled from Avignon in 1403)

- County of Boulogne (complete list) –

- Robert II, Count (1277–1314)
- Robert III, Count (1314–1325)
- William II, Count (1325–1332)
- Joanna I, Countess (1332–1360)
- Philip II, Count (1338–1346)
- Philip III, Count (1360–1361)
- John II, Count (1361–1386)
- John III, Count (1386–1404)

- Bourbonnais (complete list) –

- Béatrice de Bourgogne (1257–1310), Lady (1287–1310)

- Duchy of Brittany (complete list) –

- John II, Duke (1286–1305)
- Arthur II, Duke (1305–1312)
- John III, Duke (1312–1341)
- Joan, Duchess (1341–1364)
- Charles I, Duke (1341–1364)
- John of Montfort, co-Duke (1341–1345)
- John IV, disputed Duke (1345–1365), Duke (1345–1399)
- John V, Duke (1399–1442)

- Duchy of Burgundy (complete list) –

- Robert II, Duke (1271–1306)
- Hugh V, Duke (1306–1315)
- Odo IV, Duke (1315–1350)
- Philip I, Duke (1350–1361)
- Philip II the Bold, Duke (1363–1404)

- County of Maine (complete list) –

- Charles II, Count (1285–1325)
- Louis I, Count (1339–1384)
- Louis II, Count (1384–1417)

- Monaco (complete list) –

- Rainier I, Lord (1297–1301)
- Charles I, Lord (1331–1357)
- Rainier II, Lord (1352–1357)
- Louis, Lord (1395–1395, 1397–1402)
- Jean I, Lord (1395–1395, 1419–1454)

- County of Nevers (complete list) –

- Louis I, Count (1280–1322)
- Louis II, Count (1322–1346)
- Louis III, Count (1346–1384)
- Margaret, Countess (1384)
- Philip I, Count (1384)
- John I, Count (1384–1404)

- County of Poitou (complete list) –

- Philip I, Count (1293–1322)
- John I, Count (1319–1364)
- John II, Count (1340–1416)

Low Countries

- County of Artois (complete list) –

- Margaret II, Countess (1383–1405)

- County of Flanders (complete list) –

- Guy I, Count (1251–1305)
- Robert III, Count (1305–1322)
- Louis I, Count (1322–1346)
- Louis II, Count (1346–1384)
- Margaret III, Countess, and Philip II, Count (1384–1405)

=== Eurasia: Caucasus ===
- Gazikumukh Khanate (complete list) –

- Badr I, Shamkhal (1295–1304)
- Akhsuvar I, Shamkhal (14th century)

- Kingdom of Georgia (complete list) –

- George V, King (1299–1302, 1314–1346)
- David IX, King (1346–1360)
- Bagrat V, King (1360–1393)
- George VII, King (1393–1407)

- Eastern Georgia (complete list) –

- David VIII, King (1292–1302, 1308–1311)
- Vakhtang III, King (1302–1308)
- George VI, King (1311–1313)
- George V, King (1299–1302, 1314–1346)

- Kingdom of Imereti (complete list) –

- Constantine I, King (1293–1326)
- Michael, King (1326–1329)
- Bagrat I, King (1329–1330)
- Alexandre I, King (1387–1389)
- George I, King (1389–1396)
- Constantine II, King (1396–1401)

== Oceania ==
Chile: Easter Island

- Easter Island (complete list) –

- Te Tuhunga Hanui, King (?)
- Te Tuhunga Haroa, King (?)
- Te Tuhunga "Mare Kapeau", King (?)
- Toati Rangi Hahe, King (?)
- Tangaroa Tatarara, King (?)
- Havini(vini) Koro (or Hariui Koro), King (c.1400)

Tonga

- Tuʻi Tonga Empire (complete list) –

- Tuʻitonga Puipui, King (?)
- Havea I, King (?)
- Tatafuʻeikimeimuʻa, King (?)
- Lomiʻaetupuʻa, King (?)

United States: Hawaii

- Island of Hawaiʻi (complete list) –

- Kahaʻimaoeleʻa, supreme high chief (1285–1315)
- Kalaunuiohua, supreme high chief (1315–1345)
- Kūʻaiwa, supreme high chief (1345–1375)
- Kahoukapu, supreme high chief (1375–1405)

== See also ==
- List of state leaders in the 14th-century Holy Roman Empire
