= Al-Muzaffar Yusuf I =

Sultan of Yemen from 1249 to 1295

- Emir; Caliph
- Dirham coin minted in the name of Yusuf I, c. 1289, Zabid

Sultan of Yemen
- Reign: 1249 – 1295
- Coronation: 1249 at Al-Asha'ir Mosque
- Predecessor: Al-Mansur Umar I
- Successor: Al-Ashraf Umar II
- Born: 1222; Mecca, Sharifate of Mecca, Ayyubid Sultanate (modern-day Mecca, Saudi Arabia)
- Died: 1295 (aged 72–73); Taiz, Sultanate of Yemen (modern-day Janad, Yemen)
- Issue: Al-Ashraf Umar II; Al-Mu'ayyad Dawid
Names
- Al-Malik al-Muzaffar Shams al-Din Yusuf ibn 'Umar
Posthumous name
- Mu'awiya of Yemen
- Dynasty: Rasulid
- Father: Al-Mansur I
- Religion: Islam

Al-Malik al-Muzaffar Shams al-Din Yusuf ibn 'Umar (Arabic: الملك المظفر شمس الدين يوسف بن عمر) more commonly known as Al-Muzaffar Yusuf I, was the second Sultan of Yemen of the Rasulid dynasty from 1249 until his death in 1295.

== Early life ==
Al-Muzaffar Yusuf was born in 1222 in Mecca to Umar ibn Ali, who was appointed as the Emir of Mecca by the Ayyubid Emir of Yemen, Al-Mas'ud Yusuf. Al-Mas'ud called Umar back to Yemen in 1228 and made him his deputy. Al-Mas'ud left Yemen in 1229 for Syria and gave the Emirship of Yemen to Umar. In 1235, Caliph Al-Mustansir I sent a diploma of recognition to Umar, who proclaimed himself the Sultan of Yemen and established the Rasulid dynasty in Zabid as Al-Malik al-Mansur. Umar was assassinated in 1249 by his own guards in Zabid and was succeeded by his son Yusuf as Al-Malik al-Muzaffar.

== Reign ==
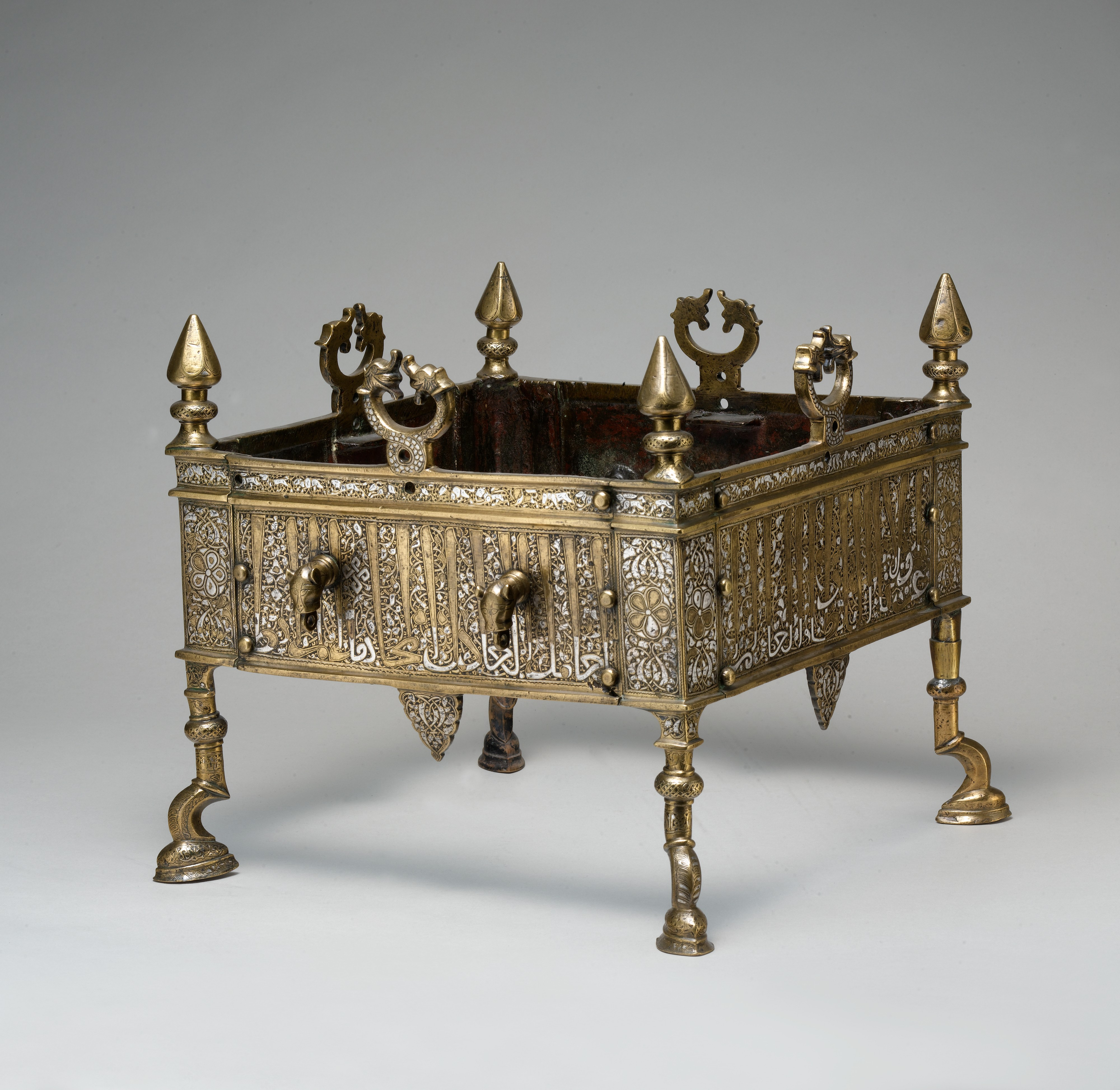
Brazier of Sultan al-Malik al-Muzaffar Shams al-Din Yusuf ibn 'Umar, 13th century

Under al-Malik al-Muzaffar Yusuf I, the Sultanate of Yemen reached its apogee. He made Yemen an influential maritime power, establishing trade with India and China in the Red Sea. Yusuf confirmed Rasulid rule over the Tihamah lowland and the southern highlands. Sanaa, one of the traditional centres of the Zaydi Imams, was temporarily occupied, and the imams were defeated on several occasions. The cool mountainous city Taiz became the base of the dynasty together with Zabid. After the Fall of Baghdad in 1258 to the Mongols, al-Malik al-Muzaffar Yusuf appropriated the title of caliph as he held partial control over the holy city of Mecca. Having reigned for 46 years, Yusuf died in 1295, leaving power to his son Umar II who assumed the title Al-Malik al-Ashraf.
