= Al-Mansur an-Nasir =

Al-Mansur an-Nasir (died 1462) was an imam of the Zaidi state in Yemen who held power in parts of the northern Yemeni highland in 1436–1462.

The old imam al-Mansur Ali bin Salah ad-Din died from the plague in 1436. His position was then claimed by three different Sayyids, of which one was al-Mansur an-Nasir. He was the great-great-grandson of the imam al-Mutawakkil al-Mutahhar bin Yahya (d. 1298). The two other competitors were al-Mutawakkil al-Mutahhar (d. 1474) and al-Mahdi Salah ad-Din (d. 1445). Al-Mansur an-Nasir tried to strengthen his claim by marrying the granddaughter of al-Mansur Ali. At this time, the once powerful Rasulid Dynasty in lowland Yemen was quickly crumbling, and fell altogether in 1454. The new Sunni lowland regime was the Tahiride Dynasty, which was engaged in warfare with the imam from its inception. Nevertheless, it was internal Zaidi dissension that finally toppled the position of al-Mansur an-Nasir. The important city San'a was eventually acquired by his rival al-Mutawakkil al-Mutahhar, later to be conquered by the Tahirides in 1462. Al-Mansur an-Nasir himself was captured by tribesmen east of Dhamar and handed over to al-Mutawakkil. He was placed in custody in Kawkaban and died there, still a prisoner, in 1462. The imamate was subsequently claimed by his son al-Mu’ayyad Muhammad.

== See also ==
- Imams of Yemen
- Rassids
- History of Yemen

Preceded by al-Mansur Ali bin Salah ad-Din	Zaydi Imam of Yemen; 1436–1462	Succeeded by al-Mu’ayyad Muhammad
