= Ahmad bin Ali al-Fathi =

Ad-Da'i Ahmad bin Ali al-Fathi (died 1349) was a claimant to the Zaidi state in Yemen, who posed as imam in 1329–1349, in rivalry with other figures.

Ad-Da'i (Missionary) Ahmad bin Ali al-Fathi was a seventh-generation descendant of Imam Abu'l-Fath an-Nasir ad-Dailami (d. 1053). He originated from the village Wakash in the Bani Matar area west of San'a. After the death of Imam al-Mahdi Muhammad bin al-Mutahhar in 1328, several pretenders surfaced. Ahmad bin Ali al-Fathi made his da'wa (call for the imamate) in 1329, from his base in the Sufian area. He is sometimes known by the title ad-Da'i (the one who practices da'wa). However, he had to contend with three other claimants called al-Mu'ayyad Yahya (d. 1346), an-Nasir Ali bin Salah (d. 1329), and al-Wathiq al-Mutahhar (d. 1379–80). The competition was fierce and many people died. Al-Mu'ayyad Yahya soon triumphed, and stood out as the main political force in the Zaidi territory until his death in 1346. The career of Ahmad bin Ali al-Fathi after c. 1330 is obscure. He died in Rughafa, close to Sa'dah, in 1349.

== See also ==
- Imams of Yemen
- Rassids

Preceded by al-Mahdi Muhammad bin al-Mutahhar	Zaydi Imam of Yemen; 1329–1349	Succeeded by al-Wathiq al-Mutahhar
