= Dahma bint Yahya =

- Writing career
- Genre: Poetry

Dahma bint Yahya (died 1434 / 837 A.H.) was a Yemeni scholar and poet, "well-versed in syntax, Law, metaphysics, astronomy, astrology and chemistry".

== Biography ==
She was the daughter of the scholar Yaḥyā Ibn al-Murtaḍā and the sister of Imam Al-Mahdī Aḥmad ibn Yaḥyā. After studying under her brother, she became a writer herself. She also taught at schools in Thulā. She died in 837 A.H.

== Works ==
- Sharh al-Azhar, 4 vols.
- Sharh al-Manzuma
- al-Kufi
- Sharh Mukhtasar al-Muntaha
