= Al-Hadi Ali =

Al-Hadi Ali (1345/46 – September 6, 1432) was a claimant to the Zaidi state in Yemen, who posed as imam from 1393 to 1432 in rivalry with another prince.

Ali bin al-Mu'ayyad was a fifth-generation descendant of the imam al-Hadi Yahya (d. 1239). After the demise of imam an-Nasir Muhammad Salah ad-Din in 1391, a struggle broke out between his son al-Mansur Ali and another contender, al-Mahdi Ahmad bin Yahya. Al-Mansur imprisoned his opponent in 1392, but was then challenged by Ali bin al-Mu'ayyad, who took the honorific (laqab) name al-Hadi Ali. During his almost 40 years long imamate he was generally overshadowed by al-Mansur Ali, who was celebrated as a mujaddid bi-sayfihi, a warlike restorer, and who died only in 1436. Nevertheless, al-Hadi Ali had a following and was counted by some as a mujaddidun. These are figures who, according to a hadith, will appear every century to restore Islam.

Al-Hadi Ali exchanged presents with the Rasulid king an-Nasir in 1410-11. It was an unusual show of respect between the Sunni and Zaidi rulers. The cooperation ended abruptly in 1417 when the Imam tried to occupy the fortress of al-Daram. However, the Rasulid army defeated his soldiers and drove them towards Wadi Juban, south of Ma'rib. Eventually peace was restored in 1421. Al-Hadi died in 1432, leaving ten sons, of whom al-Hasan (1401–1486) became a prominent scholar. Al-Hasan's son in turn, al-Hadi Izz ad-din, held the Zaidi imamate in 1474–1495.

== See also ==
- Rassids
- Imams of Yemen
- History of Yemen

Preceded by al-Mahdi Ahmad bin Yahya	Zaydi Imam of Yemen; 1392–1432	Succeeded by al-Mansur Ali bin Salah ad-Din
