= Al-Mansur al-Hasan =

Yemeni imam and politician

Al-Mansur al-Hasan (1199–1271) was an imam of the Zaidi state of Yemen who ruled in 1262–1271.

Al-Hasan bin Badr ad-Din came from the same family as imam al-Hadi Yahya (d. 1239). When the former imam Yahya bin Muhammad as-Siraji was blinded by the Rasulid governor in San'a in 1262, al-Hasan emerged as imam under the honorific al-Mansur al-Hasan. Politically, these years were the low ebb of Zaidi fortunes, since the Rasulids were in strong ascendancy. Al-Mansur al-Hasan had to stay for much of his time in Sa'dah, the traditional stronghold of the imams in the far north. Even Sa'dah was seized in 1264 by the troops of the Rasulid Sultan al-Muzaffar Yusuf. However, the hostile stance of the local tribesmen, which were still loyal to the Zaidis, forced the sultan's forces to withdraw. Like many Zaidi imams, al-Mansur al-Hasan was a prominent writer. He wrote a long urjuzah poem about the imams of the Prophet's family, up to his own days, adding a comprehensive commentary called Anwar al-yaqin. After the imam's death in Rughafa in 1271, al-Muzaffar Yusuf renewed the Rasulid push towards the north of Yemen.

== See also ==
- Imams of Yemen
- History of Yemen
- Rassids

| Preceded by Yahya bin Muhammad as-Siraji | Zaydi Imam of Yemen; 1262–1271 | Succeeded by al-Mahdi Ibrahim |
