= Al-Mahdi Ahmad bin Yahya =

Imam of the Zaidi state in Yemen

al-Mahdī li-Dīn Allāh Aḥmad ibn Yaḥyā ibn al-Murtaḍā
- المهدي لدين الله أحمد بن يحيى بن المرتضى

Zaydi Imam of Yemen
- In office 793 AH / 1391 CE – 794 AH / 1392 CE
- Preceded by: Al-Nasir Muhammad Salah al-Din
- Succeeded by: Al-Mansur Ali bin Salah ad-Din
- Title: al-Mahdī li-Dīn Allāh

Personal life
- Born: 775 AH / 1373–1374 CE Dhamar, Yemen
- Died: 840 AH / 1436–1437 CE Ẓafīr, Hajjah Governorate, Yemen
- Cause of death: Plague
- Resting place: Ẓafīr, Hajjah Governorate, Yemen
- Main interest(s): Fiqh, kalām, uṣūl al-fiqh, logic, Arabic grammar, ḥadīth, history
- Notable work(s): al-Azhār, al-Baḥr al-Zakhkhār, Ṭabaqāt al-Muʿtazilah, al-Munyah wa-l-amal fī sharḥ al-Milal wa-l-Niḥal
- Other name: Ibn al-Murtaḍā
- Occupation: Islamic scholar, jurist, theologian

Religious life
- Religion: Islam
- Denomination: Shia Islam
- School: Zaydism
- Lineage: Ḥasanī sayyid, descendant of al-Hadi ila'l-Haqq Yahya
- Sect: Zaydism
- Jurisprudence: Zaydi, Hādawiyya
- Creed: Muʿtazilī kalām
- Profession: Islamic scholar, jurist, theologian

Muslim leader
- Teacher: al-Hādī ibn Yaḥyā, Yaḥyā ibn Muḥammad al-Madḥajī, ʿAlī ibn ʿAbd Allāh ibn Abī al-Khayr, ʿAlī ibn Ṣāliḥ
- Post: Zaydi Imam of Yemen

Al-Mahdī Aḥmad ibn Yaḥyā, or Aḥmad ibn Yaḥyā Ibn al-Murtaḍā (أحمد بن يحيى المرتضى) (1363/1374 – 1436), was a Muʿtazila scholar and imam of the Zaidī state in Yemen who briefly held the imamate in 1391–1392. He was an encyclopedist and a prolific writer on a range of subjects.

Aḥmad ibn Yaḥyā was a 12th-generation descendant of the Zaidī imām ad-Da'i Yusuf (d. 1012). His full name was: al-Mahdī Aḥmad ibn Yaḥyā ibn al-Murtaḍā ibn Aḥmad al-Jawad ibn al-Murtaḍā ibn al-Mufaḍḍal ibn al-Manṣūr ibn al-Mufaḍḍal ibn al-Ḥajjāj ibn Alī ibn Yaḥyā ibn al-Qāsim ibn al-Da'ī Yūsuf.

In 1391, when the elderly imām al-Nasir Muhammad Salah al-Din died, his sons were still minors. The qāḍī, ad-Dawwarī, took temporary administration of the Zaidī domains of highland Yemen, in their name. However, the Zaidi ulema assembled in the Jamal ad-Dīn Mosque in Sanaa and appointed Aḥmad ibn Yaḥyā imām under the title 'al-Mahdī Aḥmad'. The appointment was not recognised by ad-Dawwani, who immediately appointed the deceased imām's son al-Mansur Ali bin Salah ad-Din. Al-Mahdī Aḥmad and his followers withdrew from Sanaa to Bayt Baws, and for one year the two imāms fought for supremacy. In 1392, al-Mahdī Aḥmad was captured by al-Manṣūr Alī's forces and imprisoned. In 1399, aided by prison guards, the ex-imām escaped to live in privacy until his death from plague in 1436. Although al-Mahdī Aḥmad lacked the requisite administrative and military skills for the Zaydiyyah imamate, he produced a substantial body of writings on dogmatics, logic, poetry, grammar and law.

His sister Dahma bint Yahya was also a scholar and poet. The famous Salafi scholar Muhammad Al-Shawkani wrote Al-Sayl al-jarrar, a denunciation of a text written by the Zaydi Imam Al-Mahdi Ahmad bin Yahya.

== Works ==
- Kitāb al-Baḥr al-zahhār: al-jāmiʻ li-madhāhab ʻulamāʼ al-amṣār; a theological-legal encyclopedia
- Kitāb al-milal wa al-niḥal: min ajzāʼ Kitāb al-baḥr al-zakhār: al-jāmiʻ li-madhāhab ʻulamāʼ al-amṣār
- Ṭabaqāt al-Mu'tazilah
- Bāb dhikr al-Muʻtazilah: min Kitāb al-Munyah wa-al-amal fī sharḥ kitāb al-Milal wa-al-niḥal
- Al-Mutazilah: being an extract from the Kitābu-l milal wa-n-niḥal
- Al-Kāshif li-dhawī al-ʻuqūl ʻan wujūh maʻānī al-kāfil bi-nayl al-suʼūl
- Kitāb al-Munya wa-'l-amal fī sharḥ al-milāl wa-'n-niḥal
- ʻUyūn al-Azhār fī fiqh al-aʼimmah al-aṭhār

== See also ==
- Imams of Yemen
- Rassids
- History of Yemen

| Preceded by al-Nasir Muhammad Salah al-Din | Zaydi Imam of Yemen; 1391–1392 | Succeeded by al-Mansur Ali bin Salah ad-Din |
