= Yahya bin Muhammad as-Siraji =

13th-Century Yemeni Zaidi Imam

Yahya bin Muhammad as-Siraji (died 1296) was an imam of the Zaidi state in Yemen who held the imamate in 1261–1262.

At this time, most of Yemen was under the control of the Rasulid Dynasty which was Sunni Muslim and based in the lowland. In the northern parts of the highland, members of the Zaidi elite tried to maintain a position. One of them was Yahya bin Muhammad as-Siraji, a 16th-generation descendant of the Twelver imam Hasan bin Ali (d. 669). Yahya performed the da'wa (summoning for the imamate) in 1261. The majority of the population in Hadur and surrounding districts acknowledged him. However, the Rasulids were on the alert and sent the redoubtable emir Alam ad-Din Sinjar al-Sha'bi with a force, "springing upon him like a cat." The Zaidis were unable to withstand the incursion and Yahya's followers scattered to distant places. Alam ad-Din then returned to San'a. Imam Yahya traveled to the land of Banu Fahim; however, the locals took him in custody and turned him over to Alam ad-Din. The emir blinded him in October 1262. His reign as imam is sometimes counted until 1271, though there seem to be no records of his activities in the intervening years. His death is recorded in 1296.

== See also ==
- Imams of Yemen
- History of Yemen

Preceded by al-Hasan bin Wahhas	Imam of Yemen; 1261–1262	Succeeded by al-Mansur al-Hasan
