= Al-Mahdi Salah ad-Din =

Imam for the Zaidi state in Yemen

Al-Mahdi Salah ad-Din (died 1445) was a claimant for the Zaidi state in Yemen, whose tenure as imam is counted from 1436 to 1445.

Salah ad-Din bin Ali was a descendant of the imam al-Mansur Yahya (d. 976) in the thirteenth generation. His father was the Zaidi scholar Ali bin Muhammad bin Abu'l-Qasim, who died in 1433. When the old imam al-Mansur Ali succumbed to the plague in 1436, three Sayyids made claims to the imamate. One of them was Salah ad-Din bin Ali, who took the honorific name al-Mahdi Salah ad-Din. His rivals were al-Mansur an-Nasir and al-Mutawakkil al-Mutahhar who belonged to other Rassid branches. Al-Mansur an-Nasir, who had family ties with the deceased imam, became dominant among the Zaydiyyah community in highland Yemen. He eventually captured al-Mahdi Salah ad-Din, who died in prison in Kawkaban in 1445. He was buried in the Masjid Musa, one of the smaller mosques of San'a.

== See also ==
- Imams of Yemen
- History of Yemen

Preceded by al-Mansur Ali bin Salah ad-Din	Zaydi Imam of Yemen; 1436–1445	Succeeded by al-Mansur an-Nasir
