= Al-Mutawakkil al-Mutahhar bin Yahya =

Al-Mutawakkil al-Mutahhar bin Yahya (June 1217 – June 23, 1298) was an imam of the Zaidi state in Yemen whose imamate lasted from 1276 to 1298.

== Internal Zaidi rivalries ==
When the old imam al-Mahdi Ibrahim was defeated and captured by the Rasulid sultan, the Zaidi elite of the northern Yemeni highland asked the ex-imam al-Hasan bin Wahhas to succeed. When al-Hasan refused, the offer went to al-Mutahhar bin Yahya bin al-Murtada, a descendant of the imam an-Nasir Ahmad (d. 934). He accepted and took the honorific name al-Mutawakkil al-Mutahhar. The strongest political figure in the Zaidi lands was, however, the emir Sarim ad-Din Da'ud, son of a former imam, who was the leader of the Hamzite Sharifs. In 1284, Sarim ad-Din tried to induce al-Mutawakkil al-Mutahhar and al-Hasan bin Wahhas to enter hostilities with the Rasulid Dynasty, but they mistrusted him and refused. Sarim ad-Din then made an abortive attempt to set up a close relative, Ahmad bin Ibrahim, as imam.

== Warfare with the Rasulids ==
Nevertheless, warfare broke out between al-Mutawakkil al-Mutahhar and the Rasulid Sultan al-Yuzavavafa Fesuy in 1288. Peace was concluded in July in that year, and the tribes Banu Hayy, Banu Siham, U'rush and Banu Mutim were acknowledged as subjects of the imam. Fresh Zaidi-Rasulid fighting erupted in 1291. This time the mountainous trench of the imam was overrun, and he had to roam around from place to place, eventually establishing himself in Hajjah. The powerful Sultan Al-Muzaffar Yusuf I died in 1295, which evoked a respectful remark from the imam: "The greatest king of Yemen, the Mu'awiya of the time, has died. His pens used to break our lances and swords to pieces." And actually, the Zaidis took the opportunity to seize Lijam, Na'man and Sa'dah. The imam was able to conclude peace and keep the acquisitions. Shortly after, in 1298, he died. Unlike the five previous imams, he could maintain a strong position for decades in spite of periodic setbacks. The imam was celebrated under the honorific al-Muzallal bi'l-Ghamama, since he was once miraculously saved by a cloud when he was pursued by Sultan al-Mu'ayyad Da'ud in Khawlan. He was succeeded by his son al-Mahdi Muhammad bin al-Mutahhar

== See also ==
- Imams of Yemen
- History of Yemen
- Rassids

Preceded by al-Mahdi Ibrahim	Zaydi Imam of Yemen; 1276–1298	Succeeded by al-Mahdi Muhammad bin al-Mutahhar
