= Al-Mahdi Ibrahim =

Al-Mahdi Ibrahim (died June/July 1284) was a Zaydi imam of Yemen whose imamate lasted from 1272 to 1276.

== Proclamation of the imamate ==
The late 13th century was the high tide of the rule of the Rasulid Dynasty in Yemen. In the northern highland, Zaydi nobles tried to maintain a position as imams, with varying success. In July 1272, Ibrahim bin Ahmad Taj ad-Din bin Badr ad-Din, a nephew of the former imam al-Mansur al-Hasan, proclaimed his bid for the imamate as al-Mahdi Ibrahim. His call was heeded by the population in Hadur, Banu'r-Ra'i, Banu Shihab, and other places. He entered Banu'r-Ra'i and Banu Shihab with seven followers and then led the Friday prayer among 7,000 people. Warfare soon flared up between the Zaydis and the Rasulid authorities. The able Rasulid commander in Sanaa, Alam ad-Din Sinjar al-Sha'bi, defeated the Zaydis in 1273, and in the following year, al-Mahdi Ibrahim made peace with Sultan al-Muzaffar Yusuf.

== Abortive seizure of Sanaa ==
However, in August 1275, a corps of rebellious slave soldiers seized Sanaa, and invited the imam and the Zaydi strongman Sarim ad-Din Da'ud to reside in the city. Al-Mahdi Ibrahim accepted and was led to the Cathedral Mosque of Sanaa. The Zaydi leaders drew up plans of advancing further to Dhamar. Nevertheless, al-Muzaffar Yusuf reacted quickly and moved against Sanaa with an army. Sarim ad-Din Da'ud took a position on a summit, but his troops were heavily defeated, and he barely slipped away. The imam was besieged in a fortress. Eventually, he was captured after many of his followers were killed. The Rasulid sultan treated his prisoner with great courtesy and gave him a house to live in Taiz. He stayed there until his death in 1284. Personally, although generally unsuccessful in his political affairs, al-Mahdi Ibrahim was acclaimed as a brave warrior, famous horseman, and a good poet.

== See also ==
- Imams of Yemen
- History of Yemen

Preceded by al-Mansur al-Hasan	Zaydi Imam of Yemen; 1272–1276	Succeeded by al-Mutawakkil al-Mutahhar bin Yahya
