= An-Nasir Ali bin Salah =

An-Nasir Ali bin Salah (died 1329) was a claimant to the Zaidi state in Yemen, acting in rivalry with other pretenders in 1328–1329.

Ali bin Salah bin Ibrahim was a grandson of the imam al-Mahdi Ibrahim who died in Rasulid captivity in 1284. When Imam al-Mahdi Muhammad bin al-Mutahhar died in 1328, a turbulent situation arose in the Zaidiyyah territories. Ali bin Salah put forward his da'wa (call for the imamate) in As Sudah, taking the laqab name an-Nasir. He was however immediately opposed by three other claimants. Fighting between the contenders followed, and lives were lost. After one year, an-Nasir Ali bin Salah died and was buried in As Suda. The winner in the power struggle was al-Mu'ayyad Yahya (d. 1346).

== See also ==
- Imams of Yemen
- Rassids
- History of Yemen

Preceded by al-Mahdi Muhammad bin al-Mutahhar	Zaydi Imam of Yemen; 1328-1329	Succeeded by al-Mu'ayyad Yahya
