= Al-Mahdi Ali =

Imam of the Zaydi state in Yemen

Al-Mahdi Ali bin Mohammed (25 September 1305 – 1372) was a Zaydi imam of Yemen who ruled in 1349–1372.

== Acquiring the Zaydi imamate ==
The Yemeni imamate in the highlands was often contested by rival claimants in this era. Ali bin Muhammad al-Hosni was born in the village al-Ahani in the Saada area in northern Yemen. He was not closely related to the recent imams, but an 11th-generation descendant of the imam ad-Da'i Yusuf. As a young man, Ali received a good deal of instruction in the religious sciences. In 1346, the learned and powerful Imam al-Mu'ayyad Yahya died, and no politically strong figure emerged in his stead. Under these circumstances, Ali rose to power from his base in the mountain fortress Thula in 1349. In the presence of a numerous congregation of Zaydi scholars, he adopted the title al-Mahdi Ali and took possession of Saada and Dhamar. At this time, Sanaa was dominated by two Zaydi emirs and brothers called Ibrahim bin Abdallah and Da'ud bin Abdallah. Al-Mahdi Ali laid siege to the city. However, the brothers held firm and after six months he had to lift the siege and return to Thula.

== Support for Nur ad-Din ==
During his 23 years long reign, al-Mahdi Ali was nevertheless able to amass considerable political influence in Yemen. The powerful Rasulid Dynasty ruled the lowlands, but its grip on the northern inland had been shattered since some time. The Rasulid emir of Hadar, Nur ad-Din Muhammad bin Mika'il, turned rebellious against Sultan al-Mujahid Ali in 1359. In the next year, he sought support from the Zaydi elite of Saada. Nur ad-Din entertained plans to take over the sultanate. Over the following years, he organized several raids into Rasulid territory with Zaydi assistance, with mixed success. Al-Mahdi Ali bestowed the fortress Miftah as an appanage, and the rebel resided there until his demise in 1377. Al-Mahdi Ali himself died in Dhamar in 1372, after his authority had begun to recede. His body was carried to Saada to be buried there. He was succeeded by his son an-Nasir Muhammad Salah ad-Din.

== See also ==
- Rassids

Preceded by al-Wathiq al-Mutahhar	Zaydi Imam of Yemen; 1349–1372	Succeeded by an-Nasir Muhammad Salah ad-Din
