= Al-Mansur Ali bin Salah ad-Din =

Al-Mansur Ali bin Salah ad-Din (1373 – 14 February 1436) was an imam of the Zaidi state in Yemen who ruled in 2 November 1391 – 14 February 1436, partly in rivalry with other claimants to the imamate.

== Contest over the imamate ==
Ali bin Salah ad-Din was a son of the preceding imam an-Nasir Muhammad Salah ad-Din who had held extensive power in highland Yemen. He grew up in San'a, the most important city of the realm. After an-Nasirs sudden demise in 1391, no less than four claimants to the imamate appeared, foremost among them the learned al-Mahdi Ahmad bin Yahya. The young Ali eventually prevailed. He was proclaimed imam under the name al-Mansur Ali, with the support of the scholars and population of San'a. However, a rival imam called al-Hadi Ali had some support in the northern parts of the Zaidi territory from 1393 to 1432. Due to the unrest, al-Mansur Ali had to travel frequently to trouble spots. He had to fight hard to gain control over Sa'dah, the traditional centre of Zaidi power in the north. Various strongholds of the Tayyibi Isma'ili sect were taken, and their leader Ali Shams al-Din II was forced out of Dhu Marmar, a fortress to the east of San'a. Idris Imad al-Din with the Rasulid dynasty Sultan al-Malik al-Zahir (r. 1428–1439) repeatedly fought against the Zaydi imam al-Mansur Ali (r. 1391–1436), and recaptured numerous fortresses from Zaydi control. In Zaidi historiography, the imam is celebrated as a mujaddid bi-sayfihi, a warlike restorer. That his bellicose exploits sometimes afflicted other Zaidi Muslims did not detract from his reputation. Al-Mansur Ali's rule over San'a was never in danger, but in 1395 he sacked the qadi in the city, who had been found to correspond with the Rasulid Dynasty in the lowland. Two years later he made a diplomatic foray when he sent offerings to the Rasulid Sultan al-Ashraf Isma'il I in Zabid. The offerings consisted of "five loads of articles esteemed as rarities, and five head of horses of good lineages".

== Later reign and death ==
In 1403 a tribal army from Hamdan moved towards San'a. The imam swiftly attacked the enemy force outside the city and routed the tribesmen. Shaykh Idris al-Hamdani asked for peace, but al-Mansur Ali refused to listen. Instead, he ravaged the Hamdani lands extensively, until the local shaykhs appeared again to ask for a stop of the hostilities. A peace was eventually concluded, on the condition that the Hamdanis ceded Hisn al-Munaqqab and al-Masna'ah. Some time after these events, al-Mansur Ali concluded a truce with the Rasulids. Towards the end his reign, especially after 1424, Rasulid power began to crumble when a number of short-lived sultans succeeded each other on the throne. In 1436, Yemen was ravaged by the plague, and one of the victims was al-Mansur Ali. He died in San'a and was buried in the Salah ad-Din Mosque, constructed by his father. The son of the deceased imam, an-Nasir Muhammad, took power but succumbed as well after just 28 days. After that, no less than three rival imams appeared, of whom al-Mansur an-Nasir tried to anchor his legitimacy by marrying the granddaughter of al-Mansur Ali.

== See also ==
- Imams of Yemen
- Rassids
- History of Yemen

Preceded by al-Nasir Muhammad Salah al-Din	Zaydi Imam of Yemen; 1391–1436	Succeeded by al-Mansur an-Nasir, al-Mahdi Salah ad-Din, and al-Mutawakkil al-Mutahhar
