= Al-Wathiq al-Mutahhar =

Al-Wathiq al-Mutahhar (1303 – 1379/80) was an imam of the Zaidi state of Yemen, who was also a poet. A native of As Sudah, he was the son of the powerful imam al-Mahdi Muhammad bin al-Mutahhar who died in 1328. After the death of al-Mahdi, no less than four would-be imams tried to assert their authority over the Zaidi community. One of them was al-Wathiq al-Mutahhar, who made his proclamation in 1330 from Haidah, south of San'a. However, he quickly had to yield to the strongest claimant, al-Mu'ayyad Yahya. Al-Mu'ayyad held the imamate to his death in 1346 or 1349. Although he was not really a mujtahid (a person sufficiently educated to make independent legal-religious interpretations), al-Wathiq briefly succeeded al-Mu'ayyad Yahya in 1349, and seized San'a. Again, however, he was rapidly forced to step down by a stronger candidate, al-Mahdi Ali. After this, he withdrew to teaching and literary activities, and in San'a he would die. His gravestone, in the Great Mosque (al-Jami' al-Kabir) of San'a, is dated in 781 AH (1379/80). Other texts mention the year 802 AH (1399) for his demise. The biography of al-Wathiq al-Mutahhar was written by his cousin an-Nasir bin Ali bin al-Mutahhar. The imam himself is credited with a number of writings. These include a diwan with many poems in younger literary form, and praise poems about Sultan al-Malik al-Afdal. In fact, he is one of the earliest known authors of the vernacular humayni poetry.

== See also ==
- Rassids
- Imams of Yemen

| Preceded by al-Mu'ayyad Yahya | Zaydi Imam of Yemen; 1349 | Succeeded by al-Mahdi Ali |
