= Imams of Yemen =

Monarch of Yemen
- Coat of arms of the Mutawakkilite Kingdom of Yemen

Details
- First monarch: al-Hadi ila'l-Haqq Yahya
- Last monarch: Muhammad al-Badr
- Formed: c. 897
- Abolished: 1 December 1970
- Residences: Dar al-Hajar, Sanaa, Yemen
- Pretender: Ageel bin Muhammad al-Badr

The Imams of Yemen, later also titled the Kings of Yemen, were religiously consecrated leaders (imams) belonging to the Zaydi branch of Shia Islam. They established a blend of religious and temporal-political rule in parts of Yemen from 897. Their imamate endured under varying circumstances until the end of the North Yemen civil war in 1970, following the republican revolution in 1962. Zaydi theology differs from Isma'ilism and Twelver Shi'ism by stressing the presence of an active and visible imam as leader. The imam was expected to be knowledgeable in religious scholarship, and to prove himself a worthy headman of the community, even in battle if this was necessary. A claimant of the imamate would proclaim a "call" (dawah), and there were not infrequently more than one claimant.

== History ==
=== Establishment ===
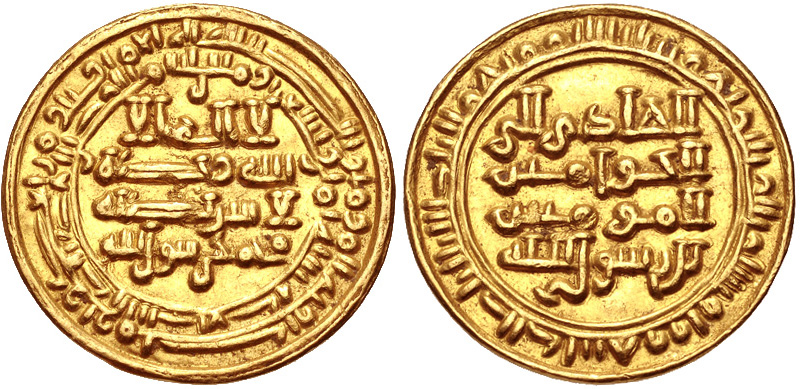
Gold dinar of al-Hadi, minted at Saada in 910/11 CE

The imams based their legitimacy on descent from the Islamic prophet Muhammad, mostly via al-Qasim ar-Rassi (d. 860). After him, the medieval imams are sometimes known as the Rassids. The first of the ruling line, his grandson al-Hadi ila'l-Haqq Yahya, was born in Medina. His fame as an intellectual as well as a leader of note, led to his invitation to Yemen. He was summoned to govern the highland tribes in 893 and again in 896–897. Al-Hadi introduced a multitude of policies and practices that evolved into the particular Yemenite Zaydiyyah brand. The efforts of al-Hadi eventually became the basic guidelines for the religious as well as political characteristics of Yemeni Zaydism. Al-Hadi, however, was not able to consolidate his rule in all of Yemen. He could not even create an enduring state in the highlands, due to the strong localism persisting in the region. There were revolts as well as segments of the population that did not accept his and his successors' pretensions to religio-political rule.

Although he did not succeed in establishing any permanent administrative infrastructure, al-Hadi's descendants, and other Alid clans who arrived in his company, became the local aristocracy of the northern highlands. It is from among them that the imams of Yemen were selected for the next one thousand years. The imams were usually chosen from the offspring of al-Qasim ar-Rassi and more specifically of al-Hadi, but on at least eight occasions they were picked from other lines descending from Muhammad's grandsons Hasan and Husain.

Yemen throughout most of that period was only rarely a unified political entity; in fact, what has included within its frontiers varied widely, and it has not been governed consistently or uniformly by any single set of rulers except for brief periods. It existed as a part of a number of different political systems/ruling dynasties between the ninth and sixteenth centuries, after which it became a part of the Ottoman Empire.

=== Rivalries with other dynasties ===
After Imam al-Hadi's death in 911, his sons took over the imamate in turn, although it was not hereditary but rather elective among the descendants of Muhammad. From the eleventh to the early seventeenth centuries, however, the imams were usually not chosen from the sons of the former imam, but the title rather circulated among the various Rassid branches. Meanwhile, a multitude of smaller dynasties and families established themselves in the highlands, as well as in the Tihamah (the low coastal plain) where the imams rarely gained influence. Among the better known of these are the Yu'firids (847–997), the Najahids (1021–1158), the Sulayhids (1047–1138), the Zuray'ids (1080–1174), and the Hatimids (1098–1174). It was during this period, when the Fatimid Caliphate was influential, that a portion of the population was converted to Isma'ilism.

Beginning with the conquest of Yemen by the family of Salah ad-Din ibn Ayyub (Saladin) in 1174, a series of dynasties exercised a modicum of control and administration in Yemen for roughly the next 400 years; these are, in chronological sequence, the Ayyubids, from 1174 to 1229; the Rasulids, from 1229 to 1454; the Tahirids, from 1454 to 1517; and the Mamluks, from 1517 to 1538, when the Ottoman Empire took the Tihamah.

During most of this period, the dynasties and their rulers were primarily engaged in familial, regional, and occasionally sectarian disputes. Ironically, the Sunni Rasulids, who eventually concentrated their rule in southern Yemen for precisely that reason, were the dynasty under which the region experienced the greatest economic growth and political stability.

For part of the medieval era the Zaydiyyah imams were eclipsed by the lowland dynasties, and for long periods there would be no imam at all (especially in 1066–1138 and 1171–1187). From the end of the thirteenth century the political fortunes of the Zaydiyya imams revived somewhat. They were able to hold their own against the Rasulids and Tahirids and sometimes expand their territory. Often however, and especially after 1436, the imamate was split between several contenders.

Comparatively little is known about the medieval Zaydi imams and their efforts to establish themselves and develop some form of administration (including tax collection), or their success in promoting Zaydi goals during this period. From the available evidence, there was very little continuity and a great deal of competition among the Zaydi families and clans. For example, in a presumably representative two-hundred-year period from the thirteenth to the fifteenth centuries, there appear to have been more than twenty different candidates for the imamate, representing more than ten distinct clans.

=== The Qasimid state ===
Eventually, the Europeans entered the Middle East, specifically the Portuguese and then others, in the effort to control the Red Sea trade. For the Zaydiyya imams, however, the Ottomans constituted the greater external threat. Ottoman expeditions managed to defeat the highland tribesmen in the mid decades of the sixteenth century. From the early seventeenth century al-Mansur al-Qasim, belonging to one of the Rassid branches (later known as the Qasimids or Yemeni Zaydi State), raised the standard of rebellion. His son al-Mu'ayyad Muhammad managed to gather the entire Yemen under his authority, expel the Turks, and establish an independent political entity. For a time, the imams ruled a comprehensive territory, including South Yemen and areas even further to the east. Their economic base was strengthened by the coffee trade of the coastal entrepot Mocha. Unlike in the previous practice, the Qasimids or Yemeni Zaydi State ruled as a hereditary dynasty.

The power of the Yemeni Zaydi State or Imamate declined in the eighteenth and nineteenth centuries, especially in the wake of the Wahhabi invasions after 1800. The territory controlled by the imams shrank successively after 1681, and the lucrative coffee trade declined with new producers in other parts of the world. The Qasimid state or Yemeni Zaydi State has been characterized as a "quasi-state" with an inherent tension between tribes and government, and between tribal culture and learned Islamic morality. The imams themselves adopted the style of Middle East monarchies, becoming increasingly distant figures. As a result, they eventually lost their charismatic and spiritual position among the tribes of Yemen. The imamate was further eclipsed by the second coming of the Turks to lowland Yemen in 1848, and to the highlands in 1872. However, the Ottoman troops were never able to entirely quell resistance against Ottoman rule. The occupants were eventually driven out by 1918, by a Qasimid side-branch which inaugurated the Mutawakkilite Kingdom of Yemen.

=== Modern history ===
For the next 44 years North Yemen was ruled by two powerful imams. Yahya bin Muhammad Hamid ad-Din and his son Ahmad bin Yahya created a kingdom there, much as the kings of England and France had done centuries earlier. The two imams strengthened the state and secured its borders. They used the imamate to insulate Yemen and revitalize its Islamic culture and society at a time when traditional societies around the world were declining under imperial rule. While Yemen under the two imams seemed almost frozen in time, a small but increasing number of Yemenis became aware of the contrast between an autocratic society they saw as stagnant and the political and economic modernization occurring in other parts of the world. This produced an important chain of events: the birth of the nationalist Free Yemeni Movement in the mid-1940s, an aborted 1948 revolution in which Imam Yahya was killed, a failed 1955 coup against Imam Ahmad, and finally, the 1962 revolution in which the recently enthroned imam Muhammad al-Badr was deposed by a group of nationalist officers and the Yemen Arab Republic (YAR) was proclaimed under the leadership of Abdullah al-Sallal.

The first five years of President Al-Sallal's rule, from 1962 to 1967, comprised the first chapter in the history of North Yemen. Marked by the revolution that began it, this period witnessed a lengthy civil war between Yemeni republican forces, based in the cities and supported by Egypt, and the royalist supporters of the deposed imam, backed by Saudi Arabia and Jordan. In 1965 Egyptian president Gamal Abdel Nasser met with King Faisal of Saudi Arabia to consider a possible settlement to the civil war. The meeting resulted in an agreement whereby both countries pledged to end their involvement and allow the people of North Yemen to choose their own government. Subsequent peace conferences were ineffectual, however, and fighting flared up again in 1966.

By 1967 the war had reached a stalemate, and the republicans had split into opposing factions concerning relations with Egypt and Saudi Arabia. In late 1967 Al-Sallal's government was overthrown and he was replaced as president by Abdul Rahman al-Iryani. Fighting continued until 1970, when Saudi Arabia halted its aid to royalists and established diplomatic ties with North Yemen. Al-Iryani effected the long-sought truce between republican and royalist forces, and presided over the adoption of a democratic constitution in 1970. Imam Muhammad al-Badr, greatly disappointed by the Saudi recognition of the republic, emigrated to London where he died in 1996.

In June 1974 military officers led by Colonel Ibrahim al-Hamdi staged a bloodless coup, claiming that the government of Al-Iryani had become ineffective. The constitution was suspended, and executive power was vested in a command council, dominated by the military. Al-Hamdi chaired the council and attempted to strengthen and restructure politics in North Yemen. Al-Hamdi was assassinated in 1977, and his successor, former Chief of Staff Ahmed Hussein al-Ghashmi, was killed in June 1978. The lengthy tenure of President Ali Abdullah Saleh, who ruled North Yemen from 1978 until it merged with South Yemen in 1990, proved more stable. Saleh strengthened the political system, while an influx of foreign aid and the discovery of oil in North Yemen held out the prospect of economic expansion and development.

== List of imams ==
There is no uncontroversial list of imams of Yemen, since many imams were not universally recognized, and sometimes eclipsed by the rule of lowland dynasties or by the Turks. The following list is fairly inclusive.

- al-Hadi ila'l-Haqq Yahya bin al-Husayn bin al-Qasim ar-Rassi 897–911
- al-Murtada Muhammad 911–913, d. 922 (son)
- an-Nasir Ahmad 913–934 or 937 (brother)
- al-Muntakhab al-Hasan 934–936 or 939 (son)
- al-Mukhtar al-Qasim 936–956 (brother)
- al-Mansur Yahya 934–976 (brother)
- ad-Da'i Yusuf 977–999 (son)
- al-Mansur al-Qasim al-Iyyani bin Ali 999–1002
- ad-Da'i Yusuf 1002–1012 (second reign)
- al-Mahdi al-Husayn 1003–1013 (son of al-Mansur al-Qasim)
- al-Mu'ayyad Ahmad bin al-Husayn 1013–1020
- Abu Talib Yahya 1020–1033
- al-Mu’id li-Din Illah 1027–1030
- Abu Hashim al-Hasan 1031–1040
- Abu'l-Fath an-Nasir ad-Dailami bin al-Husayn 1038–1053
- al-Muhtasib al-Mujahid Hamzah 1060–1067 (son of Abu Hashim al-Hasan)
- al-Mutawakkil Ahmad bin Sulayman 1138–1171 (descended from an-Nasir Ahmad)
- al-Mansur Abdallah bin Hamzah 1187–1217 (descended from al-Muhtasib al-Mujahid Hamzah)
- an-Nasir Muhammad 1217–1226 (son)
- al-Hadi Yahya bin Muhsin 1217–1239
- al-Mahdi Ahmad bin al-Husayn 1248–1258
- al-Hasan bin Wahhas 1258–1260, d. 1285
- Yahya bin Muhammad as-Siraji 1261–1262, d. 1296
- al-Mansur al-Hasan bin Badr ad-Din 1262–1271 (son of a cousin of al-Hadi Yahya)
- al-Mahdi Ibrahim bin Ahmad Taj ad-Din 1272–1276, d. 1284 (nephew)
- al-Mutawakkil al-Mutahhar bin Yahya bin al-Murtada 1276–1298
- al-Mahdi Muhammad 1301–1328 (son)
- al-Mu'ayyad Yahya bin Hamzah 1328–1346
- an-Nasir Ali bin Salah 1328–1329 (grandson of al-Mahdi Ibrahim)
- Ahmad bin Ali al-Fathi 1329–1349
- al-Wathiq al-Mutahhar 1349 (son of al-Mahdi Muhammad)
- al-Mahdi Ali bin Muhammad 1349–1372
- al-Nasir Muhammad Salah al-Din 1372–1391 (son)
- al-Mansur Ali 1391–1436 (son)
- al-Mahdi Ahmad bin Yahya bin al-Murtada 1391–1392, d. 1436
- al-Hadi Ali bin al-Muayyad 1393–1432
- al-Mahdi Salah ad-Din bin Ali 1436–1445
- al-Mansur an-Nasir bin Muhammad 1436–1462 (great-great-grandson of al-Mutawakkil al-Mutahhar bin Yahya)
- al-Mutawakkil al-Mutahhar bin Muhammad 1436–1474
- al-Mu’ayyad Muhammad 1462–1503 (son of al-Mansur an-Nasir)
- an-Nasir Muhammad bin Yusuf 1474–1488
- al-Hadi Izz ad-Din bin al-Hasan 1474–1495 (grandson of al-Hadi Ali)
- al-Mansur Muhammad bin Ali al-Washali 1475–1504
- an-Nasir al-Hasan 1495–1523 (son of al-Hadi Izz-ad-Din)
- al-Mutawakkil Yahya Sharaf ad-Din bin Shams-ad-Din 1506–1555 (grandson of al-Mahdi Ahmad)
- al-Mutahhar 1547–1572 (son)
- an-Nasir al-Hasan bin Ali 1579–1585
- al-Mansur al-Qasim bin Muhammad 1597–1620
- al-Mu'ayyad Muhammad I 1620–1644 (son)
- al-Mutawakkil Isma'il 1644–1676 (brother)
- al-Mahdi Ahmad bin al-Hasan 1676–1681 (nephew)
- al-Mu'ayyad Muhammad II 1681–1686 (son of al-Mutawakkil Isma'il)
- al-Mahdi Muhammad 1687–1718 (son of al-Mahdi Ahmad)
- al-Mansur al-Husayn I bin al-Qasim 1716–1720 (grandson of al-Mu'ayyad Muhammad I)
- al-Mutawakkil al-Qasim bin al-Hasan 1716–1727 (grandson of al-Mahdi Ahmad)
- An-Nasir Muhammad (Zaidi imam) bin Ishaq 1723, d. 1754 (grandson of al-Mahdi Ahmad)
- al-Mansur al-Husayn II 1727–1748 (son of al-Mutawakkil al-Qasim)
- al-Mahdi Abbas 1748–1775 (son)
- al-Mansur Ali I 1775–1809 (son)
- al-Mutawakkil Ahmad 1809–1816 (son)
- al-Mahdi Abdallah 1816–1835 (son)
- al-Mansur Ali II 1835–1837, d. 1871 (son)
- an-Nasir Abdallah bin al-Hasan bin Ahmad 1837–1840 (great-grandson of al-Mahdi Abbas)
- al-Hadi Muhammad 1840–1844 (son of al-Mutawakkil Ahmad)
- al-Mansur Ali II 1844–1845 (second reign)
- al-Mutawakkil Muhammad bin Yahya 1845–1849 (grandson of al-Mansur Ali I)
- al-Mansur Ali II 1849–1850 (third reign)
- al-Mansur Ahmad bin Hashim 1849–1853
- al-Mu'ayyad Abbas bin Abd ar-Rahman 1850
- al-Mansur Ali II 1851 (fourth reign)
- al-Hadi Ghalib 1851–1852, d. 1885 (son of al-Mutawakkil Muhammad)
- al-Mansur Muhammad bin Abdallah 1853–1890
- al-Mutawakkil al-Muhsin bin Ahmad 1855–1878
- al-Hadi Ghalib 1858–1872 (second reign)
- al-Mansur al-Husayn III bin Muhammad bin al-Hadi 1859–1863, d. 1888
- al-Hadi Sharaf ad-Din bin Muhammad bin Abd ar-Rahman 1878–1890
- al-Mansur Muhammad bin Yahya Hamid ad-Din 1890–1904
- al-Mutawakkil Yahya Muhammad Hamid ad-Din 1904–1948 (son)
- an-Nasir Ahmad bin Yahya 1948–1962 (son of al-Mutawakkil Yahya Muhammad Hamid ed-Din)
- al-Mansur Muhammad al-Badr 1962, d. 1996 (son)

For continuation of leadership after 1962, see President of Yemen Arab Republic.

== Beliefs ==
Unlike many of the Imams (Twelver and Isma'ili branches of the Shi'a denomination), the Zaidis do not ascribe divine or superhuman attributes to their Imams.

== See also ==
- Abolished monarchy
- President of Yemen Arab Republic
- Prime Minister of Yemen Arab Republic
- List of leaders of South Yemen
- List of Shia dynasties
- Islamic history of Yemen
- Qasimid State
- Kingdom of Yemen
