= Al-Mu'ayyad Yahya =

Imam of Yemen

Al-Mu'ayyad Yahya (October 15, 1270 – 1346) was an imam of the Zaidi state in Yemen whose tenure of the imamate lasted from 1328 to 1346.

Yahya bin Hamza was a member of the Zaidi elite, but not of the dynasty of the Rassids that usually provided imams. He was a 13th-generation descendant of imam Ali ar-Ridha (d. 818). The old Yemeni imam al-Mahdi Muhammad bin al-Mutahhar had conquered large highland territories from the Rasulid Dynasty, including the commercially and politically important city San'a. After his demise in 1328, no less than four claimants for the imamate surfaced. Apart from Yahya, these included an-Nasir Ali bin Salah, Ahmad bin Ali al-Fathi, and the deceased imam's son al-Wathiq al-Mutahhar. Yahya emerged as the supreme figure and quickly secured San'a. With the city as his base, he waged war in the following years against Taiyabi Ismaili groups of the Hamdan tribe in the Wadi Dahr. The Rasulids were in no position to take back their lost lands in the Yemeni highland, leaving the Zaidi positions unthreatened. The imam was a prominent scholar who authored Al-Intisar, the most comprehensive Zaydiyyah law book, and Ad-Da'wa al-amma, a work encouraging struggle for the true faith. It was popularly said that the number of pages he wrote were equal to the days he lived. Al-Mu'ayyad Yahya died in 1346 (or, in another account, 1349), and was buried in Dhamar. On his death, San'a was seized by two Zaidi brothers, Ibrahim bin Abdallah and Da'ud bin Abdallah, who ruled as emirs and did not claim the imam title. Their family would control San'a until 1381.

== See also ==
- Rassids
- Imams of Yemen

Preceded by al-Mahdi Muhammad bin al-Mutahhar	Zaydi Imam of Yemen; 1328-1346	Succeeded by al-Wathiq al-Mutahhar
