= Al-Nasir Muhammad Salah al-Din =

Al-Nasir Muhammad Salah al-Din or al-Nasir li Din Allah Muhammad Salah al-Din ibn Ali al-Mahdi (Arabic: الناصر لدين الله محمد صلاح الدين بن علي المهدي; 4 September 1338 – 2 November 1391) was an imam of Yemen who ruled during the period 1372–1391. He was a Zaydi imam and a descendant of the Islamic prophet Muhammad.

== Biography ==
Al-Nasir Muhammad Salah al-Din was a son of Ali al-Mahdi ibn Muhammad, who was an imam of Yemen who ruled during the period 1349–1372.

In the first half of 14th century, several imams had disputed the succession. About the middle of the century, his father Ali al-Mahdi ibn Muhammad attained considerable influence, which was however reduced before his death in Dhamar in 1372. Al-Nasir Muhammad Salah al-Din became the sole Zaydi imam of Yemen. However, the important city Sanaa was in the hands of a Zaydi family that ruled as emirs. In the year after his accession, al-Nasir Muhammad Salah al-Din attempted to seize Sanaa, but was unable to penetrate the strong defences. Instead, he resorted to strategy. He married the mother of the emir Idris bin Abdallah, but when Idris came to meet his new step-father, the latter arrested him and then marched into Sanaa in full force, in 1381. Idris and his mother were allowed to live in the city, but had no further contact with the imam. Al-Nasir Muhammad Salah al-Din was a comparatively successful ruler; he advanced as far as the Tihama in the coastland of South Arabia, moving against the Rasulids. In 1391 he was thrown off his mule and dragged along, receiving fatal injuries. When he died in Sanaa, his death was concealed for two months on account of insecurity. He is buried in the Salah al-Din Mosque, built on his initiative. He was the husband of as-Sayyidah Fatimah, daughter of the headman of the Kurds in Dhamar, who built the al-Abhar Mosque in Sanaa. The death of al-Nasir was followed by internal turmoil among the Zaydi elite, but control over Sanaa was soon acquired by his young son al-Mansur Ali bin Salah al-Din.

== Literary work ==
Al-Nasir Muhammad Salah al-Din wrote a commentary on al-Zamakhshari's al-Kalim al-Nawabigh. He titled his work al-Hikam al-Sawabigh fi al-Kalim al-Nawabigh. In the same period of time, al-Taftazani (d. 1390) wrote also a commentary on al-Zamakhshari's work with slightly different title: al-Ni'am al-Sawabigh fi al-Kalim al-Nawabigh.

Preceded by al-Mahdi Ali	Zaydi Imam of Yemen; 1372–1391	Succeeded by al-Mansur Ali bin Salah ad-Din
