= Al-Mahdi Muhammad bin al-Mutahhar =

Al-Mahdi Muhammad bin al-Mutahhar (1275 – October 28, 1328) was an imam of the Zaidi state in Yemen who ruled from 1301 to 1328.

== Zaidi victory over the Rasulids ==
The father of al-Mahdi Muhammad was the Imam al-Mutawakkil al-Mutahhar bin Yahya, who held the imamate of Zaidiyyah in the late 13th century with varying success. After al-Mutawakkil's death in Hajjah in 1298, al-Mahdi Muhammad claimed the succession, although the imamate was not strictly speaking hereditary. His term as imam is counted from either 1298 or 1301. When he acceded, the Sunni Muslim Rasulid Dynasty was still in a strong position, and dominated most of Yemen, including San'a. By and by, however, the imam was able to expand his territory in the highland. The population in the Sheref district suffered from Rasulid maladministration. In 1311, they heeded the summons of the imam, who started a military campaign against the oppressors. A major battle was fought in Yemen on 26 December 1311 where the troops of the Rasulid Sultan al-Mu'ayyad Da'udsultan were crushed. The Rasulid defeat resulted in a ceasefire agreement, which was transformed into a ten years peace in October 1312. Upper Sheref and a number of other places were acknowledged as belonging to al-Mahdi Muhammad, who furthermore received 3,000 ducats per year from the sultan's treasury.

== Conquest of San'a ==
After five years, Sultan al-Mu'ayyad Da'ud broke the peace. The ensuing fighting was grim; houses and productive trees were destroyed and the heads of the fallen were taken. In 1322, the year after al-Mu'ayyad Da'ud's death, the imam attacked San'a in full force. The Rasulid officials in the city had to sue for peace. When the governor of the city died in 1323, the local administration fell into confusion. Al-Mahdi Muhammad seized the opportunity and took over the city. The year was a turning-point. From this time, the Rasulids lost their grip on the north of Yemen, and mainly wielded power in the Tihamah coastland. The imam held sway over San'a and the highland until his death in Dhamarmar in 1328. He was brought to San'a where he was buried in the Great Mosque. His death was followed by new dissention in the Zaidi community.

== See also ==
- Rassids
- Imams of Yemen

Preceded by al-Mutawakkil al-Mutahhar bin Yahya	Zaydi Imam of Yemen; 1301-1328	Succeeded by al-Mu'ayyad Yahya
