= An-Nasir Muhammad (Zaidi imam) =

An-Nasir Muhammad (January 17, 1680 – August 23, 1754), was a Yemeni Sayyid who twice claimed the Zaidi imamate of Yemen, in 1723 and 1727–1729.

Muhammad bin Ishaq was a grandson of Imam al-Mahdi Ahmad (died 1681). In 1723, while staying in Mashriq, he proclaimed his da'wah (call for the imamate) under the name an-Nasir Muhammad. The proclamation was done in opposition to the current Imam al-Mutawakkil al-Qasim. However, a well-known man of letters, Muhammad bin Isma'il al-Amir, managed to bring about a reconciliation. When al-Mutawakkil al-Qasim died in 1727, an-Nasir Muhammad once again claimed the imamate from his base in Zafar, north-west of San'a. He had the support of the Hashid and Bakil tribesmen, and from the Sayyid lord of Kawkaban.

He was opposed by the deceased Imam's son al-Mansur al-Husayn II who held San'a. The leader of the tribesmen went to parley with al-Mansur al-Husayn but was assassinated in the latter's tent. This led to great consternation among the tribes and a round of indecisive fighting. For a brief time al-Mansur al-Husayn appears to have acknowledged an-Nasir Muhammad as Imam. Later, however, he captured the sons of an-Nasir Muhammad, and the Imam came to his opponent's court in about 1729 to do homage. He was well received, and al-Mansur al-Husayn assigned maintenance for him. One of an-Nasir Muhammad's sons stayed in confinement, while he himself withdrew to private life until his death in 1754.

== See also ==
- Imams of Yemen
- History of Yemen

Preceded by al-Mutawakkil al-Qasim	Zaydi Imam of Yemen; 1723	Succeeded by al-Mutawakkil al-Qasim
Preceded by al-Mutawakkil al-Qasim	Zaydi Imam of Yemen; 1727–1729	Succeeded by al-Mansur al-Husayn II
