= Rassid dynasty =

Zaidiyyah rulers in Yemen (897–1962)

- Parent house: Banu Hashim; Hasanids
- Country: Kingdom of Yemen
- Founded: 897; 1129 years ago
- Founder: Al-Hadi ila'l-Haqq Yahya
- Current head: Ageel bin al-Badr
- Final ruler: Muhammad al-Badr
- Titles: Imam of Yemen; King of Yemen
- Distinctions: Al-Qasim al-Rassi; al-Husayn ibn al-Qasim al-Rassi
- Deposition: 26 September 1962 (abdicated 1 December 1970)
- Cadet branches: Qasimids; Al-Houthi family

The Imams of Yemen and later also the Kings of Yemen were religiously consecrated leaders belonging to the Zaidiyyah branch of Shia Islam. They established a blend of religious and political rule in parts of Yemen from 897. Their imamate endured under varying circumstances until the republican revolution in 1962, then the formal abolition of the monarchy in 1970. Zaidiyyah theology differed from Ismailis or Twelver Shi'ites by stressing the presence of an active and visible imam as leader. The imam was expected to be knowledgeable in religious sciences, and to prove himself a worthy headman of the community, even in battle if this was necessary. A claimant of the imamate would proclaim a "call" (da'wa), and there were not infrequently more than one claimant. The historian Ibn Khaldun (d. 1406) mentions the clan that usually provided the imams as the Banu Rassi or Rassids (Arabic: الرسيين). In the original Arab sources the term Rassids is otherwise hardly used; in Western literature it usually refers to the Imams of the medieval period, up to the 16th century. The Rassid branch that came to power with imam al-Mansur al-Qasim (r. 1597-1620) is known as Qasimids (Al al-Qasimi).

== Establishment of the imamate ==
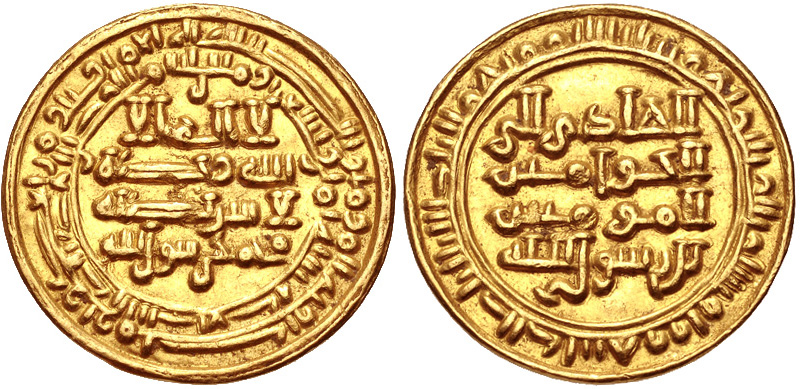
Gold dinar of al-Hadi, minted at Sa'dah in 910/11 CE

The imams based their legitimacy on descent from the Islamic prophet Muhammad, mostly via the prominent Zaydiyya theologian al-Qasim al-Rassi (d. 860) - his cognomen refers to ar-Rass, a property in the vicinity of Mecca that he owned. After him, the medieval imams are sometimes known as Rassids. The first of the ruling line, his grandson al-Hadi ila'l-Haqq Yahya, was born in Medina. His fame as an intellectual as well as a leader of note, led to his invitation to Yemen. He was summoned to govern the highland tribes in 893 and again in 896-97. Al-Hadi introduced a multitude of policies and practices that evolved into the particular Yemeni Zaidi Shia brand. The efforts of al-Hadi eventually became the basic guidelines for the religious as well as political characteristics of Yemeni Zaydism. Al-Hadi, however, was not able to consolidate his rule in all of Yemen. He could not even create an enduring state in the highlands, due to the strong localism persisting in the region. There were revolts as well as segments of the population that did not accept his and his successors' pretensions to religio-political rule.

Although he did not succeed in establishing any permanent administrative infrastructure, al-Hadi's descendants became the local aristocracy of the northern highlands, and it is from among them that most of the imams of Yemen were selected for the next one thousand years. Occasionally the imams were drawn from other lines descending from Muhammad.

Yemen throughout most of that period was only rarely a unified political entity; in fact, what was included within its frontiers varied widely, and it has not been governed consistently or uniformly by any single set of rulers except for brief periods. It existed as a part of a number of different political systems/ruling dynasties between the ninth and sixteenth centuries, after which it became a part of the Ottoman Empire.

== Rivalries with other dynasties ==
After Imam al-Hadi's death in 911, his sons took over the imamate in turn, although it was not hereditary but rather elective among the descendants of Muhammad. From the 11th to the early 17th centuries, however, the imams were usually not chosen from the sons of the former imam, but rather circulated among the various Rassid branches. Meanwhile, a multitude of smaller dynasties and families established themselves in the highlands, as well as in Tihama (the low coastal plain) where the imams rarely ruled. Among the better known of these are the Yu'firids (in San'a and Shibam, 847-997), the Sulayhids (in the southern highlands, 1047-1138), the Zuray'ids (in Aden, 1080-1174), and the Hatimids (in San'a, 1098-1174). It was during this period, when the Fatimid state was influential, that a portion of the population was converted to Isma'ili Shiʿism.

Beginning with the conquest of Yemen by the family of Salah al-Din ibn Ayyub (Saladin) in 1174, a series of dynasties exercised a modicum of control and administration in Yemen for roughly the next 400 years; these are, in chronological sequence, the Ayyubids, from 1173/74 to 1229; the Rasulids, from 1229 to 1454; the Tahirids, from 1454 to 1517; and the Mamluks, from 1517 to 1538, when the Ottoman Empire took the Yemeni Tihama.

During most of this period, the dynasties and their rulers were primarily engaged in familial, regional, and occasionally sectarian disputes. Ironically, the Sunni Rasulids, who eventually concentrated their rule in southern Yemen for precisely that reason, were the dynasty under which the region experienced the greatest economic growth and political stability.

For part of the medieval era the Zaydiyyah imams were eclipsed by the lowland dynasties, and for long periods there would be no imam at all (especially in 1066-1138 and 1171-1187). From the end of the thirteenth century the political fortunes of the Zaydiyya imams revived somewhat. They were able to hold their own against the Rasulids and Tahirids and sometimes expand their territory. Often, however, and especially after 1436, the imamate was split between several contenders.

Comparatively little is known about the medieval Zaydi imams and their efforts to establish themselves and develop some form of administration (including tax collection), or their success in promoting Zaydi goals during this period. From the available evidence, there was very little continuity and a great deal of competition among the Zaydi families and clans. For example, in a presumably representative two-hundred-year period from the thirteenth to the fifteenth centuries, there appear to have been more than twenty different candidates for the imamate, representing more than ten distinct clans.

== The Qasimid state ==
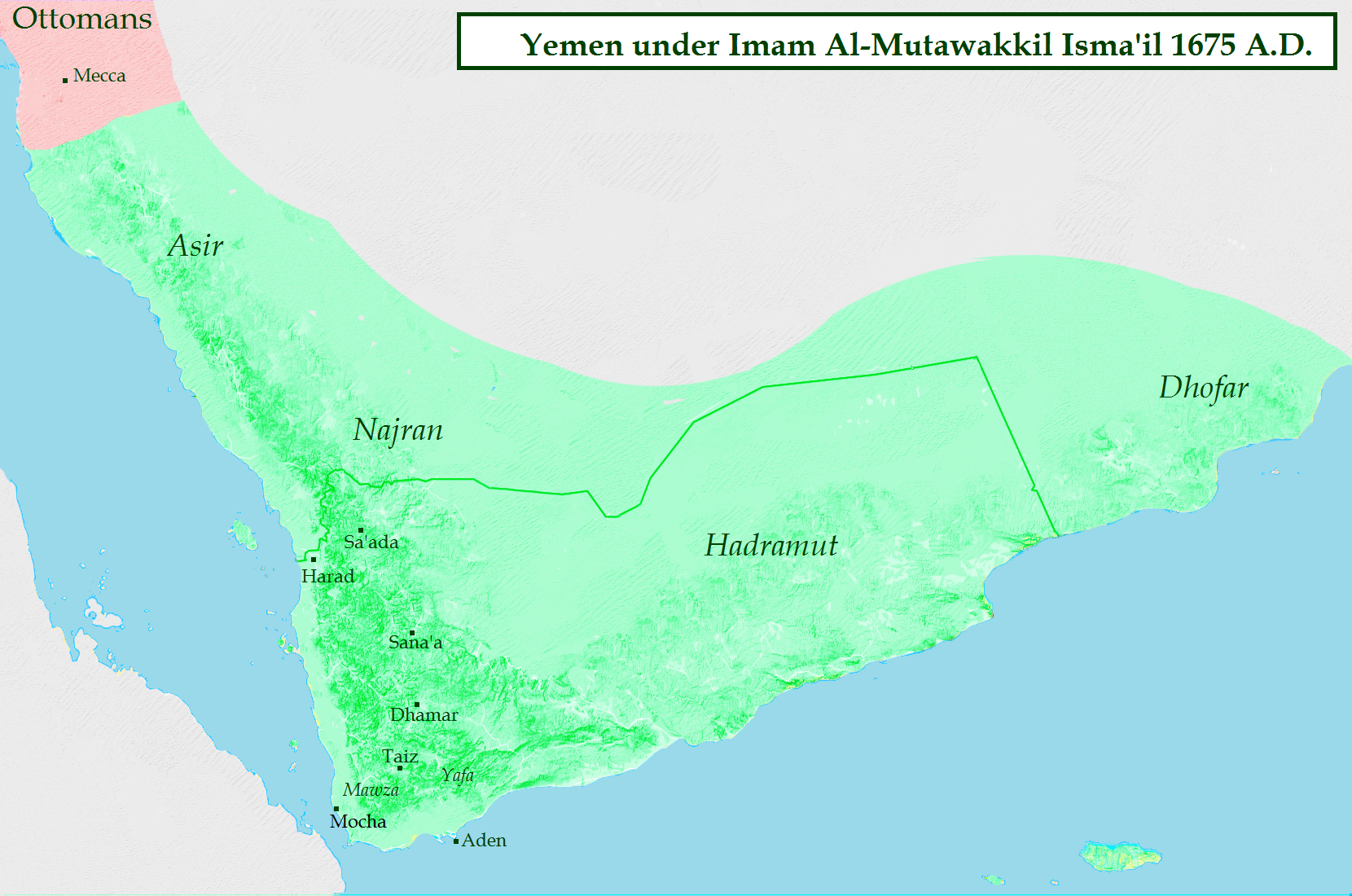
The rule of Al-Mutawakkil Isma'il 1675 AD

Eventually the Europeans entered the Middle East, specifically the Portuguese and then others, in the effort to control the Red Sea trade. For the Zaydiyya imams, however, the Ottomans constituted the greater external threat. Ottoman expeditions managed to defeat the highland tribesmen in the mid decades of the sixteenth century. From the early 17th century al-Mansur al-Qasim, belonging to one the Rassid branches (later known as the Qasimids), raised the standard of rebellion. His son al-Mu'ayyad Muhammad managed to gather the entire Yemen under his authority, expel the Turks, and establish an independent political entity. For a time, the imams ruled a comprehensive territory, including South Yemen and areas even further to the east. Their economic base was strengthened by the coffee trade of the coastal entrepot Mokha. Unlike in the previous practice, the Qasimids ruled as a hereditary dynasty.

The power of the imamate declined in the 18th and 19th century. The territory controlled by the imams shrank after the late 17th century, and the lucrative coffee trade declined with new producers in other parts of the world. Al-Mutawakkil Isma'il expanded the Qasimid state to it' greatest extent. The Qasimid state has been characterized as a "quasi-state" with an inherent tension between tribes and government, and between tribal culture and learned Islamic morality. The imams themselves adopted the style of Middle East monarchies, becoming increasingly distant figures. As a result, they eventually lost their charismatic and spiritual position among the tribes of Yemen. The imamate was further eclipsed by the second coming of the Turks to lowland Yemen in 1848, and to the highlands in 1872. However, the Ottoman troops were never able to entirely quell resistance against Turkish rule. The occupants were eventually driven out by 1918, by a Qasimid side-branch which inaugurated the Mutawakkilite Kingdom of Yemen.

== Modern history ==
For the next 44 years North Yemen was ruled by two powerful imams. al-Mutawakkil Yahya Muhammad Hamid ad-Din and his son Ahmad bin Yahya created a kingdom there much as the kings of England and France had done centuries earlier. The two imams strengthened the state and secured its borders. They used the imamate to insulate Yemen and revitalize its Islamic culture and society at a time when traditional societies around the world were declining under imperial rule. While Yemen under the two imams seemed almost frozen in time, a small but increasing number of Yemenis became aware of the contrast between an autocratic society they saw as stagnant and the political and economic modernization occurring in other parts of the world. This produced an important chain of events: the birth of the nationalist Free Yemeni Movement in the mid-1940s, an aborted 1948 revolution in which Imam Yahya was killed, a failed 1955 coup against Imam Ahmad, and finally, the 1962 takeover in which imam Muhammad al-Badr was deposed by a group of Egyptian supported and financed Sunni officers and the Yemen Arab Republic (YAR) was proclaimed under the leadership of Abdullah al-Sallal.

The first five years of President Al-Sallal's rule, from 1962 to 1967, comprised the first chapter in the history of North Yemen. Marked by the revolution that began it, this period witnessed a lengthy civil war between Yemeni republican forces, based in the cities and supported by Egypt, and the royalist supporters of the deposed imam, backed by Saudi Arabia and Jordan. In 1965 Egyptian president Gamal Abdel Nasser met with King Faisal of Saudi Arabia to consider a possible settlement to the civil war. The meeting resulted in an agreement whereby both countries pledged to end their involvement and allow the people of North Yemen to choose their own government. Subsequent peace conferences were ineffectual, however, and fighting flared up again in 1966.

By 1967 the war had reached a stalemate, and the republicans had split into opposing factions concerning relations with Egypt and Saudi Arabia. In late 1967 Al-Sallal’s government was overthrown and he was replaced as president by Abdul Rahman al-Iryani. Fighting continued until 1970, when Saudi Arabia halted its aid to royalists and established diplomatic ties with North Yemen. Al-Iryani effected the long-sought truce between republican and royalist forces, and presided over the adoption of a democratic constitution in 1970. The last ruling Rassid descendant Muhammad al-Badr, greatly disappointed by the Saudi recognition of the republic, emigrated to London where he died in 1996.

In June 1974 military officers led by Colonel Ibrahim al-Hamdi staged a bloodless coup, claiming that the government of Al-Iryani had become ineffective. The constitution was suspended, and executive power was vested in a command council, dominated by the military. Al-Hamdi chaired the council and attempted to strengthen and restructure politics in North Yemen. Al-Hamdi was assassinated in 1977, and his successor, former Chief of Staff Ahmed Hussein al-Ghashmi, was killed in June 1978. The lengthy tenure of President Ali Abdullah Saleh, who ruled North Yemen from 1978 until it merged with South Yemen in 1990, proved more stable. Saleh strengthened the political system, while an influx of foreign aid and the discovery of oil in North Yemen held out the prospect of economic expansion and development.

== See also ==
- President of Yemen Arab Republic
- Prime Minister of Yemen Arab Republic
- List of leaders of South Yemen
- Ba 'Alawi sada
- List of Shia dynasties
- Islamic history of Yemen
