= Al-Mansur al-Husayn =

Al-Mansur al-Husayn (1669–1720) was an Imam over parts of Yemen, who ruled in rivalry with other competitors in 1716–1720. He belonged to the Qasimid family who dominated the Zaidi imamate of Yemen in 1597–1962.

Al-Husayn bin al-Qasim was a grandson of the imam al-Mu'ayyad Muhammad I (d. 1644). He took advantage of popular discontent with the current imam al-Mahdi Muhammad. He claimed the imamate in the strong fortification Shaharah in 1716, taking the name al-Mansur. A large part of the country quickly fell away from the unpopular al-Mahdi Muhammad. The old imam released his nephew al-Qasim from prison and sent him to deal with the pretender. However, al-Mansur al-Husayn defeated his opponent at As Sudah. Al-Qasim soon defected from his uncle, acknowledged al-Mansur al-Husayn, and besieged the old imam. Al-Mahdi Muhammad had to give up and sue for a truce. Al-Mansur al-Husayn began to strike coins in his own name. However, already in the same year 1716 a-Qasim turned against the new imam, and proclaimed himself with the name al-Mutawakkil al-Qasim. He controlled San'a and the seaports, while al-Mansur al-Husayn merely held Shaharah and some surrounding territories. Blocked from the sources of revenue, he led a meagre existence until he died in 1720.

== See also ==
- Imams of Yemen
- History of Yemen

| Preceded by al-Mahdi Muhammad | Zaydi Imam of Yemen; 1716–1720 | Succeeded by al-Mutawakkil al-Qasim |
