= Al-Mutawakkil (name) =

Al-Mutawakkil المتوكل
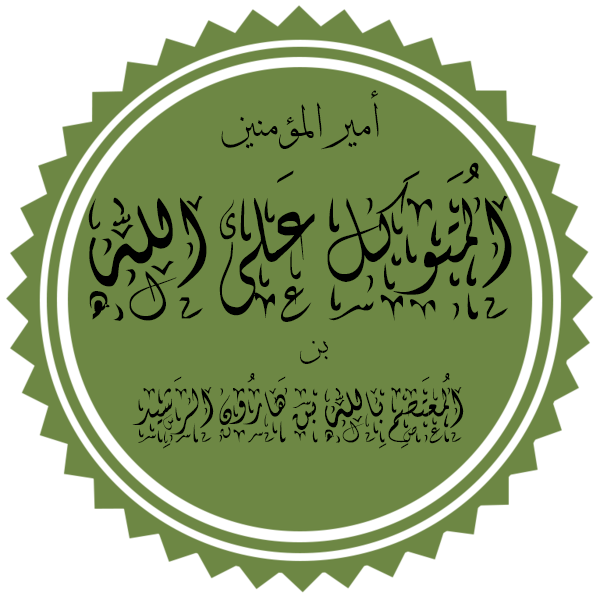
- Calligraphy representation of Caliph; Al-Mutawakkil ʽalà Allah name
- Pronunciation: Al-Muta-wakkil
- Gender: Male

Origin
- Origin: Semitic (Arabic)
- Meaning: He who relies on God
- Region of origin: Arabia (Middle East)

Al-Mutawakkil (Arabic: المتوكل) is an Islamic epithet (laqab), the title of Islamic prophet Muhammad in the Qur'an. In 847 AD, the tenth Abbasid caliph Al-Mutawakkil adopted this title. He ruled from 847 until 861. Al-Mutawakkil was the first and most famous bearer of this title among the rulers.

Centuries later after caliph al-Mutawakkil's death, other rulers also adopted this title.

== People related to caliph Al-Mutawakkil ==
- Nasib al-Mutawakkiliyyah, (died 860s) was one of the spouse of Abbasid caliph Al-Mutawakkil (r. 847–861).
- Shuja, was mother of Abbasid caliph Al-Mutawakkil was also known as Umm al-Mutawakkil (meaning: Mother of Al-Mutawakkil).

== Sultan of Morocco ==
- Musa ibn Faris al-Mutawakkil (r. 1384–1386) was the Sultan of the Marinid Sultanate

== Caliphs of Cairo ==
- Al-Mutawakkil I (r. 1362–1383 and 1389–1406) was the caliph of Cairo for the Mamluk Sultanate
- Al-Mutawakkil II (r. 1479–1497) the caliph of Cairo for the Mamluk Sultanate
- Al-Mutawakkil III (d. 1543) was the last caliph of Cairo for the Mamluk Sultanate.

== Rulers of Ifriqiya ==
- Abu al-Abbas Ahmad al-Fadl al-Mutawakkil (r. 1347–1350) (died 1350) was the ruler of Ifriqiya from Hafsid dynasty
- Abu Abdallah Muhammad IV al-Mutawakkil (r. 1494–1526), (died 1526) was the ruler of Ifriqiya from the Hafsid dynasty

== Imams of Yemen ==
- Al-Mutawakkil Ahmad ibn Sulayman (1106–1171)
- Al-Mutawakkil al-Mutahhar bin Yahya (1218–1298)
- Al-Mutawakkil al-Mutahhar (r. 1436–1474)
- Al-Mutawakkil Yahya Sharaf ad-Din (1473–1555)
- Al-Mutawakkil Isma'il (c. 1610–1676)
- Al-Mutawakkil al-Qasim (died 1727)
- Al-Mutawakkil Ahmad (1756–1816)
- Al-Mutawakkil Muhammad (died 1849)
- Al-Mutawakkil al-Muhsin (died 1878)

== See also ==
- Al-Mutawakkiliyyah, the part of Samarra city founded by caliph al-Mutawakkil (r. 847–861)
- Kingdom of Yemen, or Mutawakkilite Kingdom of Yemen, a dynasty that ruled over northwestern part of what is now Yemen from 1918 to 1970
- The dictionary definition of mütevekkil at Wiktionary
