= Al-Mu'ayyad (disambiguation) =

Al-Mu'ayyad (died 866) was the son of an Abbasid caliph.

Al-Mu'ayyad may also refer to:

- Al-Mu'ayyad (newspaper), a pan-Islamic, anti-British newspaper in Egypt
- A number of Imams of Yemen are called Al-Mu'ayyad:
  - Al-Mu'ayyad Ahmad (944–1020)
  - Al-Mu'ayyad Yahya (1270–1346)
  - Al-Mu'ayyad Muhammad (died 1503)
  - Al-Mu'ayyad Muhammad (1582–1644)
  - Al-Mu'ayyad Muhammad II (1634–1686)
  - Al-Mu'ayyad Abbas (died 1880)
- Al-Mu'ayyad fi'l-Din al-Shirazi (1000–1078), an Isma'ili scholar and theologian
- Al-Mu'ayyad Shaykh (reigned 1412–1421), a Mamluk sultan
  - Mosque of Sultan al-Muayyad
  - Maristan of al-Mu'ayyad
- Al-Malik al-Mu'ayyad (Shihab ad-Din Ahmad, reigned 1461), a Mamluk sultan
