= Al-Mahdi Abbas =

Al-Mahdi Abbas (1719 – 4 September 1775) was an Imam of Yemen who ruled in 1748–1775. He belonged to the Qasimid family, descended from the Islamic prophet Muhammad, which dominated the Zaidi imamate of Yemen in 1597–1962.

== Biography ==
=== Ascension and character ===
Abbas bin al-Husayn was the son of the Imam al-Mansur al-Husayn II. When the father died in 1748, his son Ali was expected to succeed to the imamate. However, the mother of Abbas, an African slave, prepared the way for her own son. With the help of an influential qadi, the soldiery and principal governors were made to accept Abbas as the new imam. He took the name al-Mahdi Abbas. Ali was put in confinement and died in 1759. According to his younger contemporary, the renowned scholar al-Shawkani, al-Mahdi Abbas possessed an excellent character, being intelligent, diplomatic, resolute and just, with a good disposition to scholars. He abolished several abuses that occurred before his reign, such as irregular impositions. Among the Qasimid imams, he appears to have come closest to the Zaidi ideal of the imam as a pious and generous warrior-king.

=== Niebuhr's visit during his rule ===
The German explorer in Danish service, Carsten Niebuhr, visited Yemen in 1762–1763 at the head of a scientific expedition. He met al-Mahdi Abbas whom he described in racist terms: "Had it not been for some negro traits, his countenance might have been thought a good one". The imam wore green robes with flowing sleeves, embroidered with gold lace. On his head he wore a large turban. Niebuhr and the other Europeans were permitted to kiss his hand and robe. In a subsequent interview, Niebuhr was allowed to show the imam their scientific instruments, and al-Mahdi Abbas posed several questions about European manners, commerce and learning. Niebuhr relates that the minister of the king's court, who held the title of nasi of the Jewish community and comptroller of the customs, as well as surveyor-general of the royal buildings and gardens, Rabbi Shalom Cohen ʿIraqi, known also as al-ʾOusṭā ("the skilled artisan"), fell into disrepute with the king and was imprisoned for two years in 1761 after having served under two kings for twenty-eight years. That same year, the king demolished twelve synagogues out of a total of fourteen in the city of Sanaa. Rabbi Shalom Cohen ʿIraqi was released only after paying a high ransom. At the same time, writs then issuing from the king forbade Jews in the city from building their houses higher than fourteen cubits (about 7.5 meters; 24.8 feet).

As for the king's jurisdiction over outlying districts, Niebuhr related that a number of areas in Yemen were autonomous or independent of imamic rule by this time:

- Aden under its own ruler.
- Kawkaban under a Sayyid lord.
- The Hashid and Bakil tribes under several shaykhs in a confederation.
- Abu Arish under a Sharif.
- Khawlan or Bani Amir under a shaykh.
- Sa'dah under a Sayyid and some independent shaykhs.
- Najran under the Makrami.
- Qahtan.
- Nihim.
- Khawlan east of Sanaa under four independent shaykhs.
- Jawf or Marib under a Sharif and independent shaykhs.
- Yafa under the sultans of Rassas-Maidabah, Mawsatah and Qarah.

=== Political events ===
Al-Mahdi Abbas reportedly preserved the shrunk borders of the Zaidi state vigorously. His reign was punctuated by a series of internal conflicts which he managed to overcome. In spite of the autonomous position of the Hashid and Bakil tribes, the imam kept several regiments of tribesmen, and paid them better than others. In 1750 a certain magician Ahmad al-Hasani attacked Hashid and Bakil forts but was eventually slain. In 1759 a raid by Bakil tribesmen was likewise defeated, as was a revolt by Barat tribes in 1770. Religious opposition to the imam's rule surfaced in 1768. Some qadis propagated revolt against the imam's governors since the people of San'a acted in a heretic way. They did not gain a following, however. In San'a itself, the scarcity of corn caused a rebellion in 1772. Al-Mahdi Abbas led a force that defeated the insurgents. At his help he had a Scotch and a French renegade of military experience.

=== Economic conditions and end of his Imamate ===
The account of Niebuhr testifies to the relative economic decline of the Zaidi state. While the revenue in the 17th century had been as much as 830,000 riyals per year, it decreased drastically to 300,000 under the reign of al-Mansur al-Husayn II (1727–1748). Under al-Mahdi Abbas the annual revenue again rose to 500,000 riyals, still far below the record years before the 1720s, which had been conditioned by the lucrative coffee trade. Nevertheless, al-Mahdi Abbas was a wealthy prince, who erected several public buildings and mosques in San'a. Al-Mahdi Abbas died in 1775, and the imamate was successfully claimed by his son al-Mansur Ali I.

== See also ==
- Imams of Yemen
- History of Yemen

Preceded by al-Mansur al-Husayn II	Zaydi Imam of Yemen; 1748–1775	Succeeded by al-Mansur Ali I
