= Al-Mu'ayyad Muhammad II =

Al-Mu'ayyad Muhammad II (1634 – April 27, 1686) was an Imam of Yemen who ruled from 1681 to 1686. He belonged to the Qasimid family which descended from the Islamic prophet Muhammad, and dominated the Zaidi imamate in 1597–1962. Muhammad was a son of the imam al-Mutawakkil Isma'il. When his cousin and predecessor al-Mahdi Ahmad died in 1681, a number of Qasimids laid claim to the imamate. Through the diplomatic efforts of the Ulema (religious scholars) the dispute was settled without bloodshed, and al-Mu'ayyad Muhammad II gained power. He first resided in San'a, but later moved to Dawran. During his short reign the territory of the Zaidi state founded by his grandfather began to shrink. The Yafa tribesmen in the east expelled their governor and were henceforth lost to the Yemeni kingdom.

Al-Mu'ayyad Muhammad II was not a warlike leader, but rather an ascetic and deeply religious personality who was devoted to learning. The well-known scholar and writer Muhammad ash-Shawkani considered him one of the most righteous imams. He died in 1686 in Hamman Ali in the Anis region, possibly from poisoning. The deceased imam was buried in Jabal Dawran, at the side of his father. Seven contenders claimed the succession after him in a period of only three years; of these, al-Mahdi Muhammad finally gained power in 1689 after a violent struggle.

== See also ==
- Imams of Yemen
- History of Yemen

Preceded by al-Mahdi Ahmad	Zaydi Imam of Yemen; 1681–1686	Succeeded by al-Mahdi Muhammad
