= Al-Mutawakkil Ahmad =

Al-Mutawakkil Ahmad (المتوكل أحمد) (26), (full name Ahmad bin Ali bin Abbas: أحمد بن علي بن عباس) September 1756 – 10 September 1816 was an Imam of Yemen who ruled in 1809–1816. He belonged to the Qasimid family, descendants of the Islamic prophet Muhammad, which dominated the Zaydi imamate of Yemen from 1597 to 1962.

== Biography ==
=== Taking power and rule ===
Ahmad bin Ali was a son of Imam al-Mansur Ali I. In the early 19th century, dramatic political events rocked the Zaydi state. The intervention of Wahhabi forces from the north in 1803 deprived the imam of most of the lowlands, the Tihamah. That meant the loss of vital revenues. Aggression from tribal groups outside the capital Sanaa further eroded the imam's power. As al-Mansur Ali I grew old and weak, intrigues arose around his person. Finally, in 1808, Prince Ahmad took power at court. This was a rather atypical event in Yemeni history, since sons usually did not rose against their fathers in power. Ahmad managed to abate the worst violence from the highland tribesmen. However, the governor of the important trading port Mokha refused to acknowledge the usurpation of power, and received assistance from the Sultan of Lahej and Aden. The chief of Abu Arish in the Tihamah, Sharif Hamud (d. 1818), originally a vassal under the imam, had been forced to submit to the Wahhabi movement in 1803. In 1809, however, he fell out with the pro-Wahhabi chief of Upper Asir, Abu Nuqta. Sharif Hamud again proclaimed his allegiance to the Zaydi imam and restored to him the cities Luhayya, Hodeidah and Bayt al-Faqih. Abu Nuqta marched into the territory of Sharif Hamud in July 1809 and defeated him, but shortly afterwards he was himself killed in an assault by the Abu Arish warriors on his camp. This event gave Sharif Hamud a powerful position as autonomous chief in the Tihamah. In October 1809 the old imam died. Ahmad was formally elevated to the position under the name al-Mutawakkil Ahmad.

=== Ottoman impact ===
The new imam took a conciliatory stance to gain support. He remitted taxes, forgave some previous offences, and spent generously on the poor. The governor of Mokha laid down his arms, and died in the following year. At this time the Wahhabi movement of Arabia was vigorously attacked by the Egyptian viceroy Muhammad Ali Pasha, a formal subject of the Ottoman sultan. Muhammad Ali was intent on gaining power over the potentially rich lands of Yemen. He sent envoys to Sharif Hamud and to al-Mutawakkil Ahmad suggesting mutual assistance against the Wahhabi forces. The sharif gave an evasive reply. The imam was positive to the proposal but had little means to assist Muhammad Ali. The Ottoman forces were temporarily defeated by Shaykh Tami of Asir in 1814. In the next year, however, Sharif Hamud took Shaykh Tami prisoner and delivered him to the Ottomans. While the Ottoman war against the Wahhabites was in full progress in 1816, al-Mutawakkil Ahmad died and was succeeded by his son al-Mahdi Abdallah. The latter would, within a few years, win back the Tihamah with Turkish help, at the same time putting himself in dependence of the Ottoman state.

== See also ==
- History of Yemen

Preceded by al-Mansur Ali I	Zaydi Imam of Yemen; 1809–1816	Succeeded by al-Mahdi Abdallah
