= Imamate of Yemen =

Imamate of Yemen may refer to:

- the office of the imams of Yemen between 897 and 1970
- the Qasimid State ruled by these imams between 1597 and 1849
