= Mo'mean al-Tagh =

Abu Ja'far Muhammad ibn Numan al-Ahval known as Mo'mean al-tagh (Arabic: مومن الطاق) was a prominent theologian among Kufa theologians who unify the pontificate to other theological issues. He was the follower of Muḥammad al-Bāqir (the fifth Shiite imam) and then, the ardent supporters of Ja'far ibn Muḥammad al-Ṣādiq (the sixth Shia Imam) and Musa al-Kadhim (the seventh Shiite Imam) finally reunited. He has numerous different debates with religious groups such as the Kharijites, Mu'tazilah, Hanafi and free thinkers (Zindiqs) at the time, and was a prolific writer. Some of his works include: "Imamate Book", "Book of Reply to the Mu'tazilah in front of him take priority" and several other treatises, probably the nature of the dispute and has been controversial. From titles that are attributed to him, this issue comes to mind that one of the main issues between the Shiite scholars and Mo'tazeli was the pontification on that era. The debates, was considered the most prominent of his activities. There is several listed debates that referred to Mo'mean al-Tagh, For example, a debate with Khawarij and with Ibn abi al-O'ja'e that known as stubborn freethinkers.
