= Al-Mutawakkil al-Qasim =

Al-Mutawakkil al-Qasim (died April 23, 1727) was an Imam of Yemen who ruled in 1716–1727. He belonged to the Qasimid family, that was descended from Muhammad and dominated the Zaidi imamate of Yemen in 1597–1962.

== Usurpation of power ==
Al-Qasim bin al-Husayn was a grandson of Imam al-Mahdi Ahmad (d. 1681), and the nephew of Imam al-Mahdi Muhammad (d. 1718). During the reign of his uncle, he was a military commander of note, and chastised the Hashid tribes in 1707. For some time he was imprisoned by the ruler. In 1716, however, al-Mahdi Muhammad was badly cornered by the rival imam al-Mansur al-Husayn. He therefore released al-Qasim and sent him to fight the pretender. At Sudah, al-Qasim was defeated by the latter. He subsequently fell out with al-Mahdi Muhammad and submitted to al-Mansur al-Husayn. He proceeded to besiege his uncle on behalf of the pretender imam, and forced him to plead for a truce. However, al-Qasim had no intention to stick to al-Mansur al-Husayn. In the same year 1716 he rose against the usurper and proclaimed himself imam under the name al-Mutawakkil al-Qasim. Since he controlled San'a and the seaports, he was able to block the revenues of al-Mansur al-Husayn, who was ensconced in Shaharah and whose powers were rapidly dwindling. When al-Mansur al-Husayn died in 1720, the Zaidi state was firmly in al-Mutawakkil al-Qasim's hands.

== Reign ==
The reign of al-Mutawakkil al-Qasim was comparatively tranquil. However, in 1723 his cousin an-Nasir Muhammad laid claim (da'wah) to the imamate. The well-known literati Muhammad bin Isma'il al-Amir managed to bring about a reconciliation. In 1726 the imam had an encounter with Arhab tribesmen at San'a. The imam's soldiers, led by al-Mutawakkil al-Qasim in person, defeated them with losses. In the following year the Arhab, together with the Hashid and Bakil tribes, rose again, and tried to enlist the support of the imam's son al-Husayn. Once again, Muhammad bin Isma'il al-Amir had authority enough to bring about a successful mediation. Al-Mutawakkil al-Qasim is portrayed in positive terms in the chronicles. Apart from his personal bravery, he was considered a generous character who spent much money from the treasury on the poor. He died in 1727, a few months after the truce with the tribes, and was succeeded by his son al-Mansur al-Husayn II.

== See also ==
- History of Yemen
- Imams of Yemen

Preceded by al-Mahdi Muhammad	Zaydi Imam of Yemen; 1716–1727	Succeeded by al-Mansur al-Husayn II
