= Al-Mansur Ali I =

Al-Mansur Ali I (1738 – 25 October 1809) was an Imam of Yemen who ruled in 1775–1809. He belonged to the Qasimid family, descended from the Islamic prophet, Muhammad, which dominated the Zaidi Imamate in 1597–1962.

== Biography ==
=== Early reign ===
Ali bin Abbas was one of about 20 sons of Imam al-Mahdi Abbas (d. 1775). During the reign of his father he was governor of San'a. He led a number of successful military expeditions against warring tribes. After his father's death he successfully claimed the Imamate, taking the name al-Mansur Ali. His first twenty years in power were marked by periodical petty wars with unruly tribesmen. In particular a Sayyid called Ibn Ishaq (d. 1805) raised the standard of rebellion and claimed the imamate from 1781 to 1785, assisted by Arhab tribesmen. Al-Mansur Ali I managed to deal with these crises.

=== Political developments in Arabia during his life ===
Events in other parts of Arabia led to severe losses for the Zaidi state after 1800. The religious Wahhabi movement expanded rapidly in the Hijaz. The semi-independent ruler of Abu Arish in the Tihamah, Sharif Hamud (d. 1818), was attacked in 1803 by the pro-Wahhabi chief of Upper Asir, Abu Nuqta. Defeated in battle, Sharif Hamud submitted to the Wahhabis. As a vassal of the latter, he committed himself to break off relations with al-Mansur Ali I. During the next three years he conquered the Tihamah from the Imam, while Abu Nuqta performed raids into the territory still loyal to the Zaidi state. Al-Mansur Ali I prepared an expedition to Tihamah in 1806, but it never got underway; the event indicates the weakness of the Zaidi Imamate at this time. Sharif Hamud, however, fell out with the Wahhabi regime in 1808, and in the next year he killed Abu Nuqta in an assault.

=== The end of the reign and death ===
The character of al-Mansur Ali I is debated among the chroniclers. The well-known religious scholar Muhammad ash-Shawkani, who was his grand qadi, wrote favourably of him, while other texts assert that he left governance to his ministers and kept busy with building activities and womanizing. On the other hand, he was considered brave, generous and hospitable. By the early 19th century his faculties began to fail, and intrigues arose at court while chaos reigned in the land. The wazir Hasan al-Ulufi who kept the real powers in San'a was arrested by the old Imam's son Ahmad, who took over the administration in 1808. He managed to appease the dissatisfied tribesmen who had performed raids around San'a. When al-Mansur Ali I died in the next year, his son became ruler in name, as al-Mutawakkil Ahmad.

== See also ==
- History of Yemen
- Imams of Yemen
- Wahhabism

Preceded by al-Mahdi Abbas	Zaydi Imam of Yemen; 1775–1809	Succeeded by al-Mutawakkil Ahmad
