= Al-Mansur al-Husayn II =

Al-Mansur al-Husayn II (14 June 1696 – 6 March 1748) was an Imam of Yemen who ruled in 1727–1748. He belonged to the Qasimid family which claimed descent from Muhammad, who dominated the Zaydi imamate of Yemen in 1597–1962.

== Biography ==
=== Accession and rule ===
Al-Husayn bin al-Qasim was a son of Imam al-Mutawakkil al-Qasim. At the end of his father's reign, he entertained contacts with the rebellious tribesmen of Hashid and Bakil. However, the rebellion died down and there seem to have been no further consequences for his illoyal conduct. When al-Mutawakkil al-Qasim died some months later, in 1727, al-Husayn went to Sanaa where, after his father's funeral, he laid claim to the imamate and took the title al-Mansur al-Husayn. He was opposed by another claimant, an-Nasir Muhammad, who was supported by the Hashid and Bakil, and by the lord of Kawkaban. Al-Mansur al-Husayn II retained control over Sanaa but found reason to pay allegiance to an-Nasir Muhammad. Somewhat later, new trouble flared up. Al-Mansur al-Husayn II was successful in routing his opponent's forces and captured the latter's sons. In about 1729 an-Nasir Muhammad appeared at the court of al-Mansur al-Husayn and submitted. That left the Zaydi state in the hands of al-Mansur al-Husayn II.

=== Loss of territory under his rule ===
These days witnessed economic changes detrimental to the power of the Zaydi state. Coffee had hitherto been almost solely produced in Yemen, and the rising prices provided great incomes for the country. However, in 1723 coffee began to be imported to Europe from Java, and in the 1740s from the West Indies. The losses of revenue were accompanied by loss of territory. In 1731 the imam's agents in the Aden area were murdered by a chief in Lahej, Fadl bin Ali al-Abdali. When al-Mansur al-Husayn II sent tribesmen to deal with al-Abdali, he took refuge in Yafa'a. There he persuaded the local sultan to help him driving the imam's forces from Aden and Lahej. From this date (or, in another version, from 1728) the South Yemeni Sultanate of Lahej managed its independence from the Zaydi state. Al-Mansur al-Husayn II was also opposed by his brother Ahmad, who governed Taiz and kept the revenues for himself.

=== Trouble with the French and Death ===
In 1738 a serious crises occurred in the relations between the Zaydi government and the French traders in Mokha. The governor in Mokha had the habit of purchasing goods from foreigners and, instead of paying, promise to deduct future duties. When a debt of 82,000 dollars had accumulated, the French East India Company demanded the governor to pay. As the governor refused, the city was besieged. After a severe reverse, the governor was forced to liquidate the debt. A new treaty was signed, where the duties were lowered. The imam was displeased with the conduct of the governor, who was subsequently recalled. The imam died in 1748, and was succeeded by his son al-Mahdi Abbas.

== See also ==
- History of Yemen

Preceded by al-Mutawakkil al-Qasim	Zaydi Imam of Yemen; 1727–1748	Succeeded by al-Mahdi Abbas
