= Al-Mansur al-Qasim =

Yemeni imam and independence leader (1559–1620)

Qasim
- Al-Kabir Al-Mansur Billah

Imam of Yemen
- Reign: 1597 – 19 February 1620
- Predecessor: Hassan
- Successor: Muhammad
- Born: 13 November 1559
- Died: 19 February 1620 (aged 60)
- Al-Qasim ibn Muhammad ibn Ali ibn Muhammad ibn Ali ibn al-Rasheed ibn Ahmed ibn al-Hussein ibn Ali Bani Yahya ibn Muhammad ibn Yusuf ibn Qasim ibn Yusuf ibn Yahya ibn Ahmed ibn Yahya
- Father: Muhammad ibn Ali
- Religion: Zaidiyyah

Al-Mansur al-Qasim (November 13, 1559 – February 19, 1620), with the cognomen al-Kabir (the Great), was an Imam of Yemen, who commenced the struggle to liberate Yemen from the Ottoman occupiers. He was the founder of a Zaidi kingdom that endured, under many vicissitudes, until 1970.

== Proclamation of the imamate ==
Al-Qasim bin Muhammad was a fourteenth-generation descendant of the imam ad-Da'i Yusuf (d. 1012). His father supported the imam al-Mutahhar (d. 1572), who fought the encroaching Ottomans with partial success but who was finally defeated in 1569–1570. Al-Qasim was a religious teacher at the Dawud mosque in San'a at a time when the Ottoman grip on Yemen was severely felt. The Turks promoted the Sunni legal tradition of Hanafi, at the expense of the Zaydiyyah which dominated in the highlands of Yemen. One of al-Qasim's pupils suggested him to claim the Zaidi imamate, which he first declined. The suspicions of the Turks were however raised, and al-Qasim fled San'a, finally setting forth his claim (da'wah) to the imamate in Hajur in the north-west in September 1597.

== Theological position ==
In his theological thinking al-Mansur al-Qasim upheld the Shia foundations of Zaydiyyah by stressing the eighth-century Jarudi position to the imamate which considered the first two caliphs as usurpers. He emphasized the differences between Zaydiyyah and the Mu'tazila school of theology, which laid stress on reason and rational thought, whereas some previous Yemeni imams had noted the similarities. He argued that the early imams had limited their prescriptions to what could be traced to reason, the unambiguous Qur'an text, and the generally accepted Sunnah. These imams, he argued, did not follow the Mu'tazila in their speculations and fantasies. Al-Mansur al-Qasim was also hostile to Sufism, one reason being that the Sufi orders supported the Ottoman occupants. He branded the Sufis as heretics and likened them to Ismailites, traditional enemies of the Zaidis.

== The struggle against the Ottoman Turks ==
Although supported by the Ahnumi tribesmen, al-Qasim's first years of struggle were difficult. Strong action by the Ottoman forces reduced the imam to despair by 1604. Then, however, the emir of the important stronghold Hajjah in the western mountains chose to support al-Qasim. From this point the forces of the imamate held the initiative. In 1607 the Ottoman governor Sinan made an agreement with al-Qasim, where the latter was granted possession of the areas in the northern highlands which he had subdued. Infighting among the Turkish administrators in 1613 left the north of the country exposed to the forces of the imam, and the important city Sa'dah fell in 1617. Two years later a new truce was concluded that confirmed the expanded realm of al-Qasim. By this time he controlled the entire area between Sana'a and Sa'dah. When he died in 1620, the city of San'a and the coastal region Tihamah were still in Ottoman hands. It was left to his son and successor al-Mu'ayyad Muhammad (r. 1620–1644) to expel them entirely. By this time the Yemenis possessed firearms which, together with the poor quality of local Ottoman soldiery and strong local discontent with taxation, ensured military successes against the occupiers. Although the Zaidi imamate is not strictly speaking hereditary, but depends on the qualifications and Sayyid ancestry of the claimant, al-Mansur al-Qasim actually founded a dynasty, known after him as the Qasimids.

== See also ==
- History of Yemen
- Imams of Yemen
- Rassids
- Emirate of Beihan

Vacant Ottoman rule Title last held by an-Nasir al-Hasan bin Ali	Imam of Yemen; 1597–1620	Succeeded by al-Mu'ayyad Muhammad
