= Qasimid State =

1597–1849 state in southwest Arabia

Qasimid State الدولة القاسمية (Arabic)
- 1597–1849
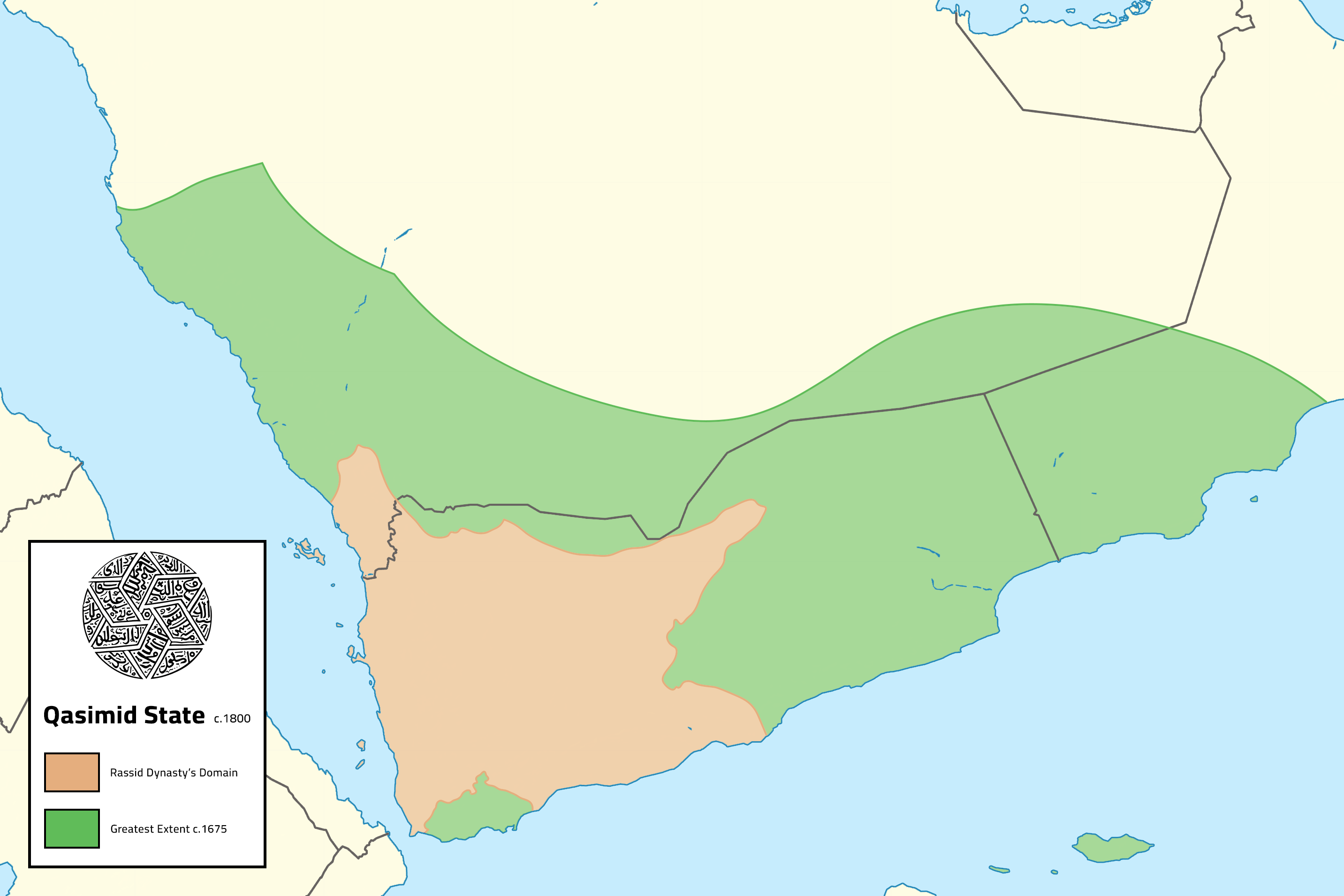
- Qasimid State in 1800 with depiction of Rassid coin
- Capital: Sanaa
- Religion: Hadawi Zaidi Islam; Sunni traditionist Zaidism (19th century)
- Government: Imamate
- Imam
  - 1597–1620: Al-Mansur al-Qasim
  - 1620–1640: Al-Mu'ayyad Muhammad
  - 1640–1676: Al-Mutawakkil Isma'il
  - 1676–1681: Al-Mahdi Ahmad
  - 1681–1686: al-Mu'ayyad Muhammad II
  - 1689–1718: Al-Mahdi Muhammad
  - 1716–1727: Al-Mutawakkil al-Qasim
  - 1727–1748: Al-Mansur al-Husayn II
  - 1748–1775: Al-Mahdi Abbas
  - 1775–1809: Al-Mansur Ali I
- Historical era: Early modern
  - Proclamation: 1597
  - Takeover of Sanaa: 1628
  - Secession of Lahej: 1740
  - Loss of coastal territories: 1803
  - Reincorporation into Ottoman Empire: 1849
Preceded by
Yemen Eyalet
Succeeded by
Sultanate of Lahej
Yemen Vilayet
Principality of Najran
Other Zaidi sultanates
- Today part of: Yemen; Saudi Arabia; Oman

The Qasimid State (Arabic: الدولة القاسمية), also known as the Imamate of Yemen, was a state in South Arabia which was ruled by the Imams of Yemen. It was founded by Imam al-Mansur al-Qasim in 1597, absorbed much of the Ottoman-ruled Yemen Eyalet by 1628, and then completely expelled the Ottomans from Yemen by 1636. The Qasimid State continued to exist into 18th and 19th century, but gradually fractured into separate small states. The most notable of those states was the Sultanate of Lahej; most of those states (except Lahej) were submitted by the Ottomans and incorporated into the restored Ottoman province of Yemen Eyalet in 1849.

== Background ==
Zaydi tribes in the northern highlands, particularly the Hashid and Bakil, constantly resisted Ottoman imperial rule. Justifying their presence as the triumph of Islam, the Ottomans accused the Zaydis of being infidels. Hassan Pasha was appointed the governor of the Yemen Eyalet, which enjoyed a period of relative peace from 1585 to 1597. Pupils of al-Mansur al-Qasim suggested that he claim the imamate and fight the Ottomans. He declined at first, but was infuriated by the promotion of the Hanafi school in place of Zaydi fiqh (jurisprudence).

== History ==
=== Proclamation and expansion ===
Al-Mansur al-Qasim proclaimed the Imamate in September 1597. Although supported by the Ahnumi tribesmen, al-Qasim's first years of struggle were difficult. Strong action by the Ottoman forces reduced the imam to despair by 1604. Then, however, the emir of the important stronghold Hajjah in the western mountains chose to support al-Qasim. From this point the forces of the imamate held the initiative. By 1608, Imam al-Mansur had regained control over the highlands and signed a ten-year truce with the Ottomans. When al-Mansur al-Qasim died in 1620, his son al-Mu'ayyad Muhammad succeeded him and reconfirmed the truce with the Ottomans. In 1627, the Ottomans lost Aden and Lahej. 'Abdin Pasha was ordered to suppress the rebels but failed and had to retreat to Mokha.

After al-Mu'ayyad Muhammad expelled the Ottomans from Sana'a in 1628, only Zabid and Mokha remained under Ottoman control. He captured Zabid in 1634 and allowed the Ottomans to leave Mokha peacefully. The reasons behind his success were the tribes' possession of firearms and the fact that they were unified behind him.

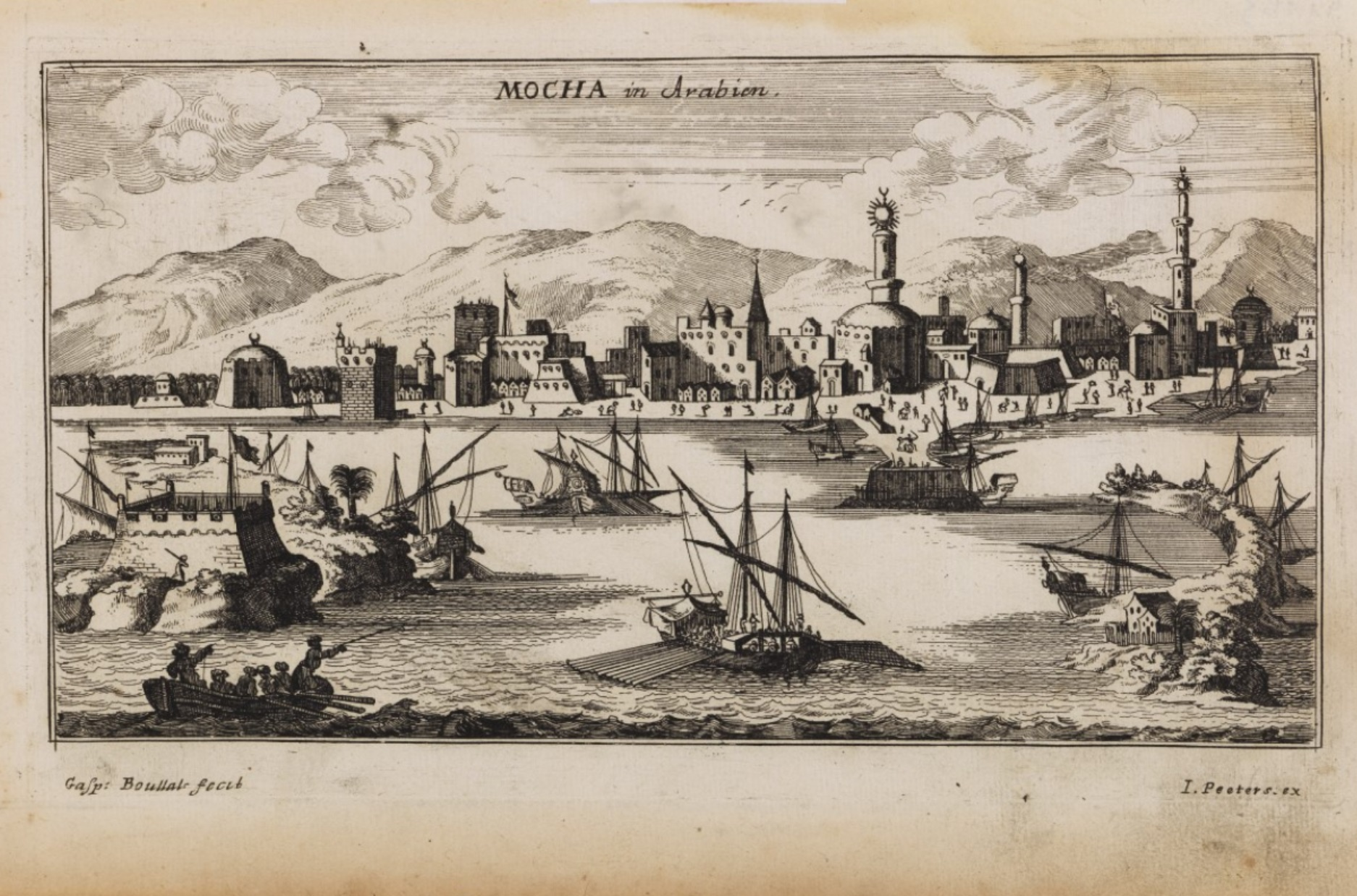
Mocha was Yemen's busiest port in the 17th and 18th century.

In 1632, al-Mu'ayyad Muhammad sent an expeditionary force of 1000 men to conquer Mecca. The army entered the city in triumph and killed its governor.

The Ottomans were not ready to lose Mecca, so they sent an army from Lower Egypt to fight the Yemenis. Seeing that the Ottoman military was too numerous to overcome, the Yemenis retreated to a valley outside Mecca. Ottoman troops attacked the Yemenis by hiding at the wells that supplied them with water. This plan succeeded, inflicting 200 casualties, most from thirst. The tribesmen eventually surrendered and returned to Yemen.

By 1636, the Zaydis had driven the Ottomans out of the country completely.

Al-Mu'ayyad Muhammad died in 1644. He was succeeded by Al-Mutawakkil Isma'il, another son of al-Mansur al-Qasim, who conquered Yemen in its entirety, from Asir in the north to Ẓafār in the east.

=== Consolidation (17th-18th centuries) ===
During al-Mutawakkil Isma'il reign and that of his successor, al-Mahdi Ahmad (1676–1681), the Imamate implemented some of the harshest sumptuary laws (ghiyar) against the Jews of Yemen, which culminated in the Mawza Exile to a hot and arid region in the Tihamah. The Qasimid state was the strongest Zaydi state that ever existed.

Upon the death of the Imam in 1681, his son Muhammad was prevented from assuming the Imamate due to counter-claims by relatives in Rada, Shaharah, Sa'dah and Mansura. Through mediation of the ulama (religious scholars), one of these, al-Mu'ayyad Muhammad II, took power.

Al-Mu'ayyad Muhammad II was not a warlike leader, but rather an ascetic and deeply religious personality who was devoted to learning. The well-known scholar and writer al-Shawkani considered him one of the most righteous Imams. He died in 1686 in Hamman Ali in the Anis region, possibly from poisoning. The deceased Imam was buried in Jabal Dawran, alongside his father. Seven contenders claimed the succession after him in only three years; of these, al-Mahdi Muhammad finally gained power in 1689 after a violent struggle.

A broader theological and political shift took place during this period. Increasing interactions with Hanafi and Shafi'i schools of Sunni Islam led to an ideological shift in the prevalent form of Zaydism. While the rulers ostensibly conformed to Hadawi law (thus the "imamate"), the doctrines had to be modified to allow hereditary, as opposed to traditional merit-based, selection of imams. This transition did not happen abruptly, but through a long-lasting process that had its roots in the fifteenth century. This process was termed "Traditionism" by scholar Bernard Haykel.) Traditionism saw the gradual merging of Zaydi doctrine with elements of Shafi'i thought. By the mid-eighteenth century, the rulers of the Qasimid State had become dynastic, a more formal state bureaucracy was established, and the traditional Zaydi notion of khurūj (revolt against unjust rule) was deemed unacceptable. Under the newly bureaucratic system, education and courts became more centralized; a variety of new offices such as chamberlains were created; and there was a move away from a tribal military to one that was mainly composed of slaves.

=== Decline and partition (18th-19th centuries) ===
The imamate did not follow a cohesive mechanism for succession, and family quarrels and tribal insubordination led to the political decline of the Qasimi dynasty in the 18th century.

In 1728 or 1731, the chief representative of Lahij declared himself an independent sultan in defiance of the Qasimid Dynasty and conquered Aden, thus establishing the Sultanate of Lahej. In 1740, the 'Abdali sultan of Lahij became completely independent. It became independent thanks to the fracturing of the Zaidi state in northern Yemen. The Sultanate of Lahej became an independent entity, from 1728 to 1839.

The rising power of the fervent Wahhabi movement cost the Zaidi state its coastal possessions after 1803. The imam was able to regain them temporarily in 1818, but new intervention by Muhammad Ali of Egypt in 1833 again wrested the coast from the ruler in Sana'a. After 1835, the imamate changed hands with great frequency and some imams were assassinated. After 1849, the Zaidi polity descended into chaos that lasted for decades.

=== Economy ===
During that period, Yemen was the sole coffee producer in the world. The country established diplomatic relations with the Safavid dynasty of Persia, the Ottomans of Hejaz, the Mughal Empire in India and Ethiopia. The Fasilides of Ethiopia sent three diplomatic missions to Yemen, but the relations did not develop into a political alliance as Fasilides had hoped, due to the rise of powerful feudalists in the country. In the first half of the 18th century, the Europeans broke Yemen's monopoly on coffee by smuggling out coffee trees and cultivating them in their own colonies in the East Indies, East Africa, the West Indies and Latin America.

== See also ==
- Islamic history of Yemen

== Sources ==
- Haider, Najam (2021). "Zaydism" (PDF). Handbook of Islamic Sects and Movements. Brill Publishing. pp. 204–234. doi:10.1163/9789004435544_013. ISBN 978-90-04-43554-4.
- Haykel, Bernard (2003). Revival and Reform in Islam: The Legacy of Muhammad al-Shawkānī. New York: Cambridge University Press. ISBN 0-521-81628-9.
- Madelung, W. (2002). "Zaydiyya". In Bearman, P. J.; Bianquis, Th.; Bosworth, C. E.; van Donzel, E. & Heinrichs, W. P. (eds.). The Encyclopaedia of Islam, Second Edition. Volume XI: W–Z. Leiden: E. J. Brill. pp. 477–481. doi:10.1163/1573-3912_islam_COM_1385. ISBN 978-90-04-12756-2.
