= Al-Shawkani =

Yemeni theologian (1759–1834)

Muhammad ibn Ali ibn Abdullah al-Shawkani
- Title: Shaykh al-Islam, Imam, Qadi

Personal life
- Born: 11 July 1759 CE /1173 AH
- Died: 30 October 1834 CE /1250 AH Sana'a, Yemen
- Region: South Arabia
- Main interest(s): Fiqh, Hadith, Aqeedah
- Notable work: Nayl al-Awtar
- Occupation: Historiographer, bibliographer, Islamic scholar, jurist

Religious life
- Religion: Islam
- Denomination: Sunni
- Jurisprudence: Salafi (with Zahiri influences)
- Creed: Athari

Muslim leader
- Post: Chief Qadi of Yemen (1795–1834)
- Influenced by: Ibn Taymiyyah, Ibn Qayyim, Dawud al-Zahiri, Ibn Hazm
- Influenced: Modern Salafism Al-Sayyid Muhammad Rashid Rida Muhammad Nasiruddin al-Albani Abd al-Aziz ibn Baz Siddiq Hasan Khan
- Arabic name
- Personal (Ism): Muḥammad محمد
- Patronymic (Nasab): ibn ʻAlī ibn Muḥammad ibn ʻAbd Allah بن علي بن محمد بن عبدالله
- Teknonymic (Kunya): Abu ʻAlī أبو علي
- Toponymic (Nisba): Al-Shawkānī الشوكاني

Muḥammad ibn Ali ibn Muḥammad ibn Abd Allah, better known as al-Shawkani (Arabic: الشوكاني) (11 July 1759–30 October 1834) was a prominent Yemeni Sunni Islamic scholar, jurist, theologian and reformer. Al-Shawkani was one of the most influential proponents of Athari theology and is respected as one of their canonical scholars by Salafi Muslims. His teachings played a major role in the emergence of the Salafi movement. Influenced by the teachings of the medieval Hanbali scholar Ibn Taymiyya, al-Shawkani became noteworthy for his staunch stances against the practice of Taqlid (imitation to legal schools), calls for direct interpretation of Scriptures, opposition to Kalam (speculative theology) as well as for his robust opposition to various Sufi practices which he condemned as Shirk (idolatry).

== Name ==
His full name was Muhammad Ibn Ali ibn Muhammad ibn Abdullah al-Shawkani. The surname "ash-Shawkani" is derived from Hijrah ash-Shawkan, which is a town outside Sanaa.

== Biography ==
Born into a Zaydi Shi'a Muslim family, ash-Shawkani later on converted to Sunni Islam. He called for a return to the textual sources of the Quran and Hadith. As a result, ash-Shawkani opposed much of the Zaydi doctrines and engaged in vigorous Sunnification campaigns across Yemen during his tenure as Chief Qadi. He also opposed Sufism and mystical practices of Sufi orders, considering them to be an affront to Tawhid (monotheism). Ash-Shawkani is considered as a mujtahid, or authority to whom others in the Muslim community have to defer in details of religious law. Of his work issuing fatwas (judicial verdicts), ash-Shawkani stated "I acquired knowledge without a price and I wanted to give it thus." Part of the fatwa-issuing work of many noted scholars typically is devoted to the giving of ordinary opinions to private questioners. Ash-Shawkani refers both to his major fatwas, which were collected and preserved as a book, and to his "shorter" fatwas, which he said "could never be counted" and which were not recorded. Ash-Shawkani was known to be influenced by the thought of Dawud al-Zahiri school of jurisprudence and also practicing the jurisprudential independent thinking or ijtihad.

He is credited with developing a series of syllabi for attaining various ranks of scholarship and used a strict system of legal analysis based on Sunni thought. He insisted that the ulama were required to ask for textual evidence, that the gate of ijtihad was not closed and that the mujtahid was to do ijtihad independent of any madhhab, a view which stemmed from his opposition to taqlid for a mujtahid, which he deemed to be a vice with which the Shariah had been inflicted. Al-Shawkani asserted that the decline of the Muslim community was due to their distancing from the Scriptures, the principle sources of religion. Hence he condemned the principle of taqlid and proposed ijtihad (independent legal reasoning) as the solution of the problems faced by Muslims. Shawkani equated unyielding imitation to the madhhabs as a type of shirk (polytheism) and accused scholars promoting such methodology of apostasy.

Al-Shawkani wrote the book Nayl al-Autar, a major reference in Islamic law. He also wrote several treatises condemning various popular mystical practices which he viewed to be shirk (polytheism). He praised the contemporary Arabian Islamic reformer Muhammad ibn 'Abd al-Wahhab (1703–1792) who had advocated for similar views and refuted his Yemeni theological opponents in correspondence. Upon hearing the death of Muhammad ibn Abd al-Wahhab, al-Shawkani wrote a poem praising his efforts to eradicate shirk, defend Tawhid and his call to Quran and Hadith. Reviving the classical theologian Taqi al-Din ibn Taymiyya's (1263 - 1328 CE/ 661 - 728 AH) doctrines on Tawḥīd and shirk, al-Shawkānī equated the adherents of Sufi orders to the pagan Arabs of Quraysh.

The Imam of Yemen Mansur Ali appointed al-Shawkani as the Chief Qadi of Yemen in 1795, an office he held until his death. He made a powerful critique of Zaydism, arguing that many Zaydi theological and legal doctrines have no basis in Scriptures. Meanwhile, Zaydis believed that their Imams of Ahl al-Bayt (Prophetic family) had stronger authority than the Sunni Hadith collections; which was the heavy focus of al-Shawkani's approach. Zaydi doctrines also stipulated that unjust rulers be removed and replaced by a just Imam, through force, if necessary. In contrast, al-Shawkani supported the Quietist Sunni doctrine that necessitated obedience to rulers, even the unjust who lacked qualifications. Hence, the ruling Qasimid dynasty of Yemen supported scholars like al-Shawkani who legitimized their dynastic rule.

As chief judge from 1795 until 1834, al-Shawkani implemented his reformist project with state-backing and placed many of his students in positions of influence, who subsequently carried on his legacy into the 21st century. During the 1796 and 1802 street clashes between Sunni traditionalists and Zaydi Shi'ites, al-Shawkani was able to convince the Qasimid rulers to side with the Sunnis. He also campaigned for the 1825 execution of the Zaydi scholar Ibn Hariwa who criticised al-Shawkani's Sunnification efforts and state policies. Due to the official patronage of al-Shawkani and other Sunni scholars, Zaydi clerics were unable to stop the spread of Hadith-centric approach of al-Shawkani and his students; who upheld the authority of Sunni Hadith over the opinions of Zaydi Imams. Hence, the Zaydis viewed al-Shawkani as seeking to undermine Zaydism by creating a sect modelled on the Ahl al-Hadith school.

Acting as al-Mansur's secretary, Shawkani would often correspond with the leaders of the Emirate of Diriyah between 1807 and 1813. Defending the Saudi rulers, ash-Shawkani refuted the allegations that they were from the Khawarij since they followed Muhammad ibn Abd al-Wahhab who learned Hadith from the scholars of Medina and they campaigned against superstitious beliefs prevalent in Najd acting upon the views of the Hanbali scholars Ibn Taymiyyah and Ibn Qayyim al-Jawziyya. The reform efforts of ash-Shawkani throughout the 39 years of his tenure as Chief Judge would fundamentally transform the religious landscape of Yemen. By his death in 1834, the Qasimid rulers had fully turned from Hadawi principles to embrace Sunni-style traditionism.

== Legacy ==
Muhammad ash-Shawkani is widely regarded as one of the most prolific Hadith scholars of his time; whose ideas influenced later Salafi movements. He played a major role in the revival of the works of medieval theologian Ibn Taymiyya. He was one of the most prominent figures in the late lineage of hadith-oriented Sunni scholars that emerged in Yemen with Muhammad ibn Ibrahim al-Wazir (d. 1436 A.C). Salafis in Sa'ada, would later claim ash-Shawkani as an intellectual precursor. Future Yemeni regimes would uphold his Sunnization policies as a unifier of the country, invoking his teachings to undermine Zaydi Shi'ism under the broad label of "Islamic reform". Ash-Shawkani is popularly deemed as a Mujaddid of his era by adherents of the Wahhabi and various Salafi movements.

Beyond Yemen, his works are widely used in Sunni schools. He also profoundly influenced the Ahl-i Hadith in the Indian subcontinent (such as Siddiq Hasan Khan) and Salafis across the globe. Much of the Ahl-i Hadith literature condemning grave-visits (ziyarat) and idolatry (shirk) was modelled on the literature of Yemeni scholarship, most notably al-Shawkani, who followed the works of Ibn Taymiyya and Ibn Qayyim. In recognition of his contributions, Siddiq Hasan Khan ranked al-Shawkani as amongst the "Huffāz al-Islām" (greatest guardians of Islam) alongside Ibn Taymiyya, Ibn Qayyim and Ibn al-'Amir al-San'ani. Apart from the Ahl-i Hadith, the Wahhabis also often refer to al-Shawkani for legitimacy; citing his support for Muhammad ibn 'Abd al-Wahhab.

Ash-Shawkani had been a prominent representative of the traditionalist school that advocated Ibn Taymiyya's doctrines such as opposition to Falsafa (Islamic philosophy), Kalam (scholastic theology), Isrāʾīliyyāt, etc. emphasising literalist interpretations of the Qur’an. Alongside Shah Waliullah Dehlawi (1703-1762 A.C), Shawkani made significant contributions to the field of Tafsir (Qur'anic exegesis) during the era of revivalist trends of 18th and early 19th centuries. He completed his seminal Qur'anic commentary Fath al-Qadir in 1814, which demonstrated remarkable methodological similarities to Fawz al-Kabir, the Tafsir work compiled a few decades earlier by Shah Waliullah. Ash-Shawkani's Qur'anic interpretations demonstrated a firm belief in Scriptural perfection; which upheld that literal meanings of the Qurʾān and the Sunnah, are to be the sole authoritative sources of exegesis. Fath al-Qadir laid the groundwork for future reformist exegetical endeavours; such as Ṣiddīq Ḥasan Khān’s Fatḥ al-Bayān, Syrian Salafi reformer Jamal al-Din al-Qasimi's Maḥāsin al-Taʾwīl and Muhammad Rashid Rida's Tafsir al-Manar.

== Works ==
He has been described as "an erudite, prolific, and original writer who composed more than 150 books (many of which are multivolume works)", some of his publications including:

- Nayl al-Awtar
- Fath al-Qadir, a well known tafsir (exegesis)
- al-Badr at-Tali
- Tuhfatu al-Dhakirin – Sharh Uddatu Hisna al-Haseen: a superb one volume commentary on the collection "Uddatu Hisna al-Haseen", on ahadith of Adhkar, by Ibn Al-Jazari (d. 833H)
- Al-Fawaid al-Majmu'ah fil Ahadith al-Maudhuah a collection of fabricated hadith
- Irshad al-Fuhul – a book on Usul al-fiqh
- Ad-Durur al-Bahiyyah fil-Masaa'il il-Fiqhiyyah – a concise Fiqh manual
- Ad-Daraaree al-Mudhiyyah Sharh ad-Durur il-Bahiyyah – his detailed explanation of his Fiqh manual
- Adab at-Talab wa Muntaha al-Arab – advice on the etiquette and manners of one who is seeking Islamic knowledge
- Al-Qawl al-Mufeed fi Hukm at-Taqlid – an explanation of the ruling regarding blind following (Taqlid) of the opinions of Fiqh schools (Madhahib) and its harms.
- Al-Sayl al-Jarrar - includes the denunciation of a text written by the Zaydi Imam Al-Mahdi Ahmad bin Yahya.

== See also ==
- List of Islamic scholars
