= Al-Mahdi Ahmad =

Yemeni imam

Al-Mahdi Ahmad (1633 – 10 July 1681) was an Imam of Yemen, who ruled in 1676–1681. He belonged to the Qasimid family that was descended from Muhammad.

== Struggle for the imamate ==
Ahmad was a son of al-Hasan bin al-Qasim (d. 1639), a brother of the former imam al-Mutawakkil Isma'il. In the reign of his uncle, in 1658, he led forces that loosely incorporated Hadramaut in the Yemeni kingdom. When al-Mutawakkil Isma'il died, the imamate was claimed by Ahmad. He had, however, to fight his cousin and rival al-Qasim who controlled Shaharah, an almost impregnable fortress north of Sanaa. Ahmad collected forces which besieged Shaharah and forced al-Qasim to accept his claim.

== Reign ==
At his accession, the imam was already a mature man in his upper forties. He upheld the Yemeni suzerainty in Hadramaut, and was reported to be a pious figure. His residence was al-Ghiras north-east of Sanaa. In 1679 the imam expelled the Jewish population from Sanaa and the surrounding regions and forced them to settle in Mawza close to Mokha, in what is known as the Mawza Exile. Those Jews who survived were later allowed to move to Qa'a al-Yahud (the new Jewish Quarter), a suburb situated two kilometers from Sanaa. At the death of the imam in 1681, his son Muhammad was prevented from assuming the imamate due to counter-claims by relatives in Rada, Shaharah, Sa'dah and Mansura. Through mediation of the Ulama (religious scholars), one of these, al-Mu'ayyad Muhammad II, took power.

== See also ==
- History of Yemen
- Jews of Yemen

Preceded by al-Mutawakkil Isma'il	Zaydi Imam of Yemen; 1676–1681	Succeeded by al-Mu'ayyad Muhammad II
