= Al-Mutawakkil Isma'il =

Imam of Yemen

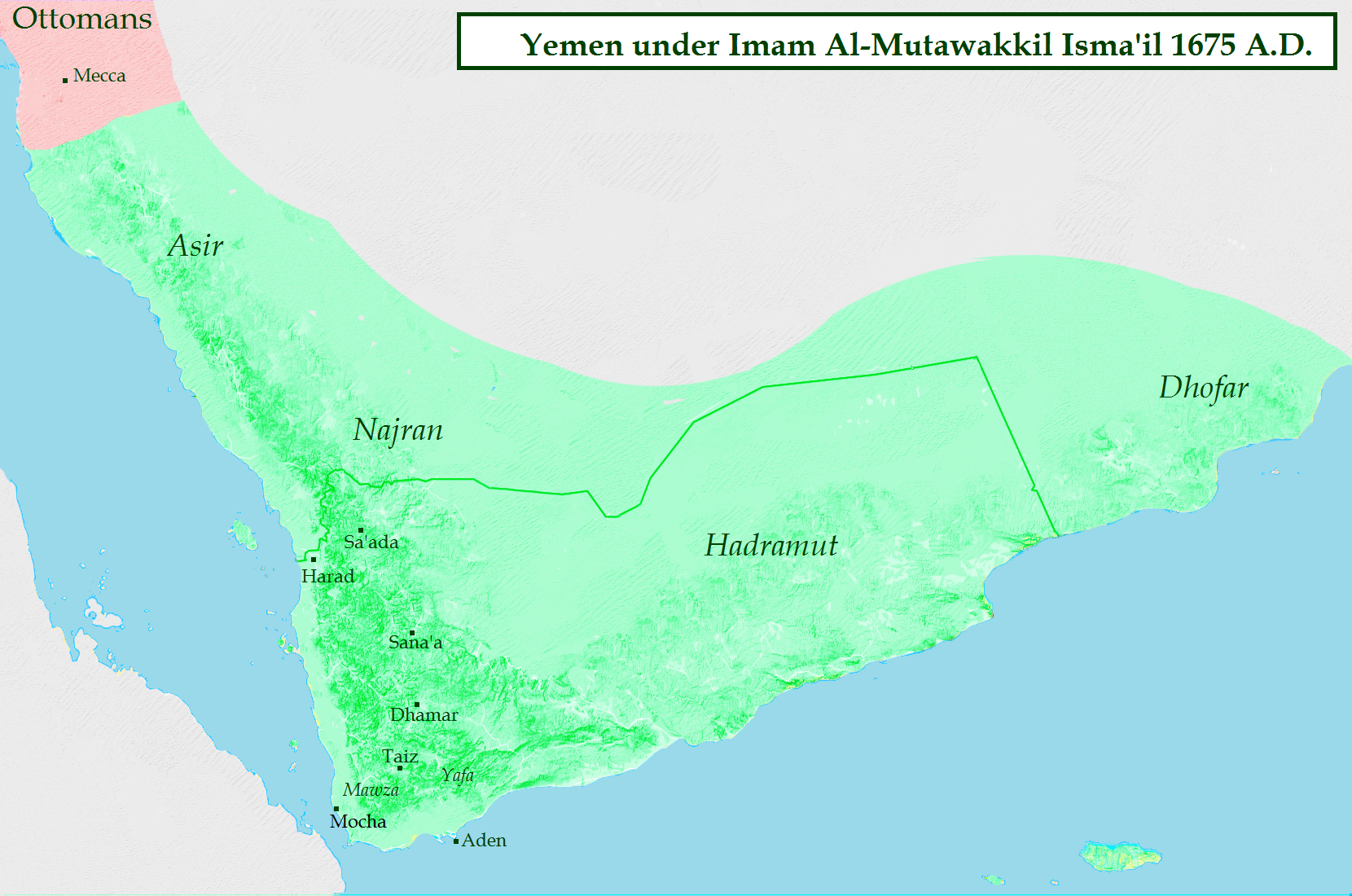
The rule of Al-Mutawakkil Isma'il in 1675

Al-Mutawakkil Isma'il (c. 1610 – 15 August 1676) was an Imam of Yemen who ruled the country from 1644 until 1676. He was a son of Al-Mansur al-Qasim. His rule saw the biggest territorial expansion of the Zaydi imamate in Greater Yemen.

== Biography ==
=== Early reign and policies ===
Al-Mutawakkil Isma'il was the son of the founder of the Qasimid imamate, al-Mansur al-Qasim. In 1644 his elder brother al-Mu'ayyad Muhammad died. With his death, fraternal strife broke out, as several brothers competed for the imamate. In the end, the other brothers submitted to Isma'il. In Zaydi sources, his reign is portrayed in exceedingly positive terms. Yemen was restored to prosperity as the farmers enjoyed excellent harvests. His rule was considered just and incorruptible. Nevertheless, in 1648 a dispute arose between the imam and the various ulema over taxation policy. As Ismail managed to uphold public order in the deeply localized and factionalized Yemeni society, merchants ventured to visit Yemen from other countries. The coffee trade that went through Mokha had been going on for some time and gave the imam's government increased revenues.

=== Conquest of Hadramaut ===
The authority of al-Mutawakkil Isma'il expanded eastwards along the South Arabian coast. Aden had been conquered by Yemeni forces in 1644. In 1654, a struggle for the throne in the Kathiri area provided the imam with an excuse to send a sizable army into the Hadramaut. The Yafa'a tribesmen submitted, as did the Kathiri sultan. A further expedition in 1658 renewed the suzerainty of the imam in an area as far east as Dhofar. However, the conquest of Hadramaut resulted in a military confrontation with Sultan bin Saif, the sultan of Oman. Being in control of the seas in these areas, the Omanis were able to raid Yemen. Insecurity at sea led to a decrease in goods being imported into the Yemeni seaports.

=== Diplomatic relations and policies ===
Yemen in the 17th century was not a very outward-looking society, but its role as virtually the sole coffee producer of the world made it a vital link in the Indian Ocean trading system. Al-Mutawakkil Isma'il's reign saw a number of diplomatic ties with other powers around the periphery of the Indian Ocean. An Ethiopian embassy visited the imam in 1646, and a Yemeni return visit took place in the following year. With Mughal India there were likewise friendly contacts. Surat on the Indian west coast was the principal trading partner of Yemen at this time. The Ottoman Empire, which had lost control over Yemen in 1635, planned a renewed attack in 1674. However, this was abandoned over their fear of Portuguese power.

=== Interior policy, death and succession crisis ===
Although he was the most resourceful of the Qasimid line, al-Mutawakkil Isma'il had to contend with the deep localism persisting in the Yemeni society, in particular among the highland tribes. Some tribes were not taxed, but on the contrary received stipends to keep quiet. This was a practice that prevailed until the 20th century. The imam himself is reputed to have lived a life of Spartan simplicity; he would sew and sell caps for his subsistence, and his household consisted of his one wife and a female slave.

During the imam's reign, he quelled what he thought was a rebellion against the Yemeni state, led by the Jewish leader of a Sabbatean sect, Suleiman Jamal. Although the imam resided in al-Suda, he was informed by the governor of Sana'a about the man's actions (i.e. he had tried to usurp authority) and the man was immediately sentenced to die. The imam then made it more difficult for his Jewish subjects by confiscating their property and by prohibiting them from owning land.

Al-Mutawakkil Isma'il died in 1676, and a dispute arose between two of his nephews over the succession. Of these, al-Mahdi Ahmad finally succeeded to the imamate.

== See also ==
- History of Yemen

Preceded by al-Mu'ayyad Muhammad	Zaydi Imam of Yemen; 1644–1676	Succeeded by al-Mahdi Ahmad
