= Al-Mu'ayyad Muhammad =

Al-Mu'ayyad Muhammad (1582 – September 1644) was an Imam of Yemen (1620–1644), son of Al-Mansur al-Qasim. He managed to expel the Ottoman Turks entirely from the Yemenite lands, thus confirming an independent Zaydi state.

== Succeeding to the imamate ==
Muhammad was the son of Imam al-Mansur al-Qasim who restored the Zaydi imamate and began the cumbersome process of conquering back Yemen from the Ottoman occupiers. When he took the reins of government from his father in 1620, much of the highland was in Zaydi hands, and there was an uneasy truce with the Turks. In 1622 the population in and around Saada in the north refused to pay taxes to the imam. Muhammad then sent his brother Saif al-Islam al-Hasan who put down the revolt. Al-Hasan, however, found means to win the confidence of the locals through reforms, and was appointed governor on behalf of the imam. Through this act of delegation of power to a relative, the power of the Qasimid family was confirmed in the north. In 1626, Muhammad conquered Jabal Fayfa east of Abu Arish. In the same year he decided to break the truce with the Ottomans after the latter had executed one of his ulemas who had gone to the Turkish-controlled Sanaa. The tribes of northern Yemen responded enthusiastically to his call. The sharifs of the Sulaymanid province of northern Tihamah and the amirs of Kawkaban supported Muhammad. The rising scored victories against Turkish troops. Most of the lowland area of Tihamah fell to the imam's forces, and Sanaa was besieged. The Ottoman difficulties were aggravated by the attacks of Shah Abbas the Great on Turkish positions in Iraq.

== Expulsion of the Ottomans ==
In 1629 Imam al-Mu'ayyad Muhammad proposed a truce with the Ottomans, as he saw the need to rest his own forces. The governor Haydar Pasha agreed, and on 9 March 1629 he handed over the keys to Sanaa to the imam's son Ali. The Turks withdrew to the coast under the imam's protection, and another son, Yahya, was made governor (amil) of Sanaa. Yet a major city, Taiz, fell in the same year. In 1635 the Turks took to the offensive with an augmented force, but were defeated. Now they finally gave in, agreeing to surrender the lowland cities Zabid, and Mokha, and Kamaran Island. Thus the first period of Ottoman rule in Yemen was at an end.

== Governance and personality ==
Al-Mu'ayyad Muhammad spent most of his reign fighting the Ottomans, as well as bringing a degree of unity among the various tribal groups of Yemen. In this work he was assisted by his able brothers al-Hasan (d. 1639), al-Husayn (d. 1640) and Ahmad (d. 1650). Ahmad was the ancestor of a line of hereditary lords of Sa'dah which sometimes opposed the authority of the imams. The imam's own son al-Qasim headed a dynastic branch that governed Shahara. Al-Mu'ayyad Muhammad was also a writer of note. Thirteen texts by his hand have been preserved, many of them legal opinions and interpretations that are based on Zaydi dogma. He declined to enforce some aspects of the shariah on society, since this could have alienated his tribal supporters. At his death, al-Mu'ayyad Muhammad was succeeded by his brother al-Mutawakkil Isma'il, though not without fraternal strife among contenders.

== See also ==
- History of Yemen

Preceded by al-Mansur al-Qasim	Zaydi Imam of Yemen; 1620–1644	Succeeded by al-Mutawakkil Isma'il
