= Imamate =

Theological or political status in Islam

The term Imamate or Imamah (Arabic: إمامة, imāmah) refers to leadership, most commonly the office of an Imam, or to religious and communal authority. In Sunni Islam, it is associated with the leadership of the Muslim community, particularly in a political sense. In Shia Islam, it refers to the divinely appointed leadership of the community after Muhammad, embodied by the Twelve Imams.

== Etymology ==
The Arabic word imamah derives from the root related to "to lead" or "to go before." Imamate is a term in Islam that refers to leadership, the office of the imam, or religious authority. It can also mean broader authority in a communal or legal context.

== Historical development ==
The concept of imamate emerged in the early ages of Islam after disputes over Muhammad's succession. The disagreements evolved into the separate branches of Sunni and Shia Islamic views of authority. One debate was the leadership was a selection, consultation, lineage, or a divine designation. Shia developed theological guidelines for an imam. Sunni traditions framed imam leadership in terms of political legitimacy and communal welfare.

== Theology ==
=== Sunni Islam ===
In Sunni Islam, imamate often refers to the caliphate or leadership of the Muslim community. Islam theology and law believe the office of the imam is required to protect the religion, maintaining order, and enforcing law. The appointment of an Imam or Caliph is an obligation incumbent upon the Muslim community through election, nomination, or military power; in contrast to a divinely commanded designation.

=== Shia Islam ===
Imamate in Shia Islam is a central doctrine, especially in Ismaili and Twelver doctrines. In Shia Islam, the imam is a divinely appointed guide critical to preserve and interpret the religion and faith. Ismaili belief emphasizes the imamate is vital for Muslims to under the exoteric and esoteric dimensions of the Quran. In the Twelver doctrine, the belief is that imams are members of the Prophet's family and are necessary guides after Muhammad.

== Sectarian branches ==
Disagreements over the lineage and nature of the Imamate led to major schisms within Shia Islam.

=== Twelver Shi'ism ===
Twelver Shi'ism is the largest branch that recognizes a succession of twelve Imams. Following the death of the eleventh Imam, Hasan al-Askari, in 874 CE, the Twelver doctrine believes that his son entered a state of Occultation. They believe his son is alive in hiding until his return as the Mahdi to restore justice.

=== Ismailism ===
Following the death of Imam Ja'far al-Sadiq, a group, known as the Ismailis, branched off and recognized al-Sadiq's eldest son, Isma'il ibn Ja'far or the grandson Muahmmad ibn Isma'il as the rightful Imam. Ismailis developed a rich esoteric philosophy around the Imamate developing and maintaining an uninterrupted line of living Imams.

=== Zaydism ===
The Zaydis represent a distinct theology rejecting the requirements of divine designation and infallibility. Zaydis claim that any pious, learned descendant of Muhammed who assert his right to leadership through uprising against tyranny can establish himself as the Imam.

== List ==
- Caucasian Imamate, a state during the early and mid-19th century in the Eastern Caucasus
- Imamate of Oman, a state existed in what is now Oman
- Imamate of Aussa, an early modern state in Ethiopia
- Imamate of Futa Jallon, a state in West Africa from 1725 until 1896
- Imamate of Futa Toro, a state in West Africa from 1776 until 1861
- Hiraab Imamate, a Somali state in the 17th and 18th centuries
- Imams of Yemen, political leadership of the Zaidi branch of Shia from 897 until 1962
- Rustamid Imamate, an Ibadi Persian dynasty in North Africa from 767 until 909
- Imamate of Nafusa, a state in Libya from the 8th century until 911
- Mu'ammarid Imamate, a short-lived state after the fall of the First Saudi State from 1818 until 1820
- Imamate of Nejd, the Second Saudi State, existing from 1824 to 1891
- Nizari Ismaili state, a Shia state in the Middle East from 1090 until 1273
- Imamate of Nasr ad-Din, a short-lived state during the Mauritanian Thirty Years' War from 1673 until 1674
