= List of 19th-century religious leaders =

This is a list of the top-level leaders for religious groups with at least 50,000 adherents, and that led anytime from January 1, 1801, to December 31, 1900. It should likewise only name leaders listed on other articles and lists.

== Buddhism ==
=== Pure Land Buddhism ===
- Jodo Shinshu (complete list) –

- Hongwanji-ha

- Honnyo, Monshu (1799–1826)
- Kōnyo, Monshu (1826–1871)
- Myōnyo, Monshu (1871–1903)

- Ōtani-ha

- Tatsunyo, Monshu (1792–1846)
- Gonnyo, Monshu (1846–1889)
- Gennyo, Monshu (1889–1908)

=== Tibetan Buddhism ===
- Dalai Lama of the Gelug (Yellow Hat sect) –

- Jamphel Gyatso, 8th Dalai Lama (1760–1804)
- Lungtok Gyatso, 9th Dalai Lama (1808–1815)
- Tsultrim Gyatso, 10th Dalai Lama (1822–1837)
- Khendrup Gyatso, 11th Dalai Lama (1841–1856)
- Trinley Gyatso, 12th Dalai Lama (1858–1875)
- Thubten Gyatso, 13th Dalai Lama (1878–1933)

- Panchen Lama of the Gelug (Yellow Hat sect) –

- Palden Tenpai Nyima, Panchen Lama (1782–1853)
- Tenpai Wangchuk, Panchen Lama (1855?–1882)
- Thubten Chökyi Nyima, Panchen Lama (1883–1937)

- Karmapa Lama (Kagyu sect) –

- Khakyab Dorje, 15th Karmapa Lama (?–1922)

== Christianity ==
=== Catholicism ===
- Roman Catholic Church (complete list) –

- Pius VII (1800–1823)
- Leo XII (1823–1829)
- Pius VIII (1829–1830)
- Gregory XVI (1831–1846)
- Pius IX (1846–1878)
- Leo XIII (1878–1903)

- Old Catholicism: Church of Utrecht –

- Johannes Jacobus van Rhyn, Archbishop of Utrecht (1797–1808)
- vacant, Archbishop of Utrecht (1808–1814)
- Willibrord van Os, Archbishop of Utrecht (1814–1825)
- Johannes van Santen, Archbishop of Utrecht (1825–1858)
- Henricus Loos, Archbishop of Utrecht (1858–1873)
- Johannes Heykamp, Archbishop of Utrecht (1874–1892)
- Gerardus Gul, Archbishop of Utrecht (1892–1920)

=== Eastern Orthodoxy ===
- Ecumenical Patriarchate of Constantinople, the first among equals in Eastern Orthodoxy (complete list) –

- Neophytus VII, Ecumenical Patriarch (1789–1794, 1798–1801)
- Callinicus V, Ecumenical Patriarch (1801–1806, 1808–1809)
- Gregory V, Ecumenical Patriarch (1797–1798, 1806–1808, 1818–1821)
- Jeremias IV, Ecumenical Patriarch (1809–1813)
- Cyril VI, Ecumenical Patriarch (1813–1818)
- Eugenius II, Ecumenical Patriarch (1821–1822)
- Anthimus III, Ecumenical Patriarch (1822–1824)
- Chrysanthus I, Ecumenical Patriarch (1824–1826)
- Agathangelus I, Ecumenical Patriarch (1826–1830)
- Constantius I, Ecumenical Patriarch (1830–1834)
- Constantius II, Ecumenical Patriarch (1834–1835)
- Gregory VI, Ecumenical Patriarch (1835–1840)
- Anthimus IV, Ecumenical Patriarch (1840–1841)
- Anthimus V, Ecumenical Patriarch (1841–1842)
- Germanus IV, Ecumenical Patriarch (1842–1845)
- Meletius III, Ecumenical Patriarch (1845)
- Anthimus VI, Ecumenical Patriarch (1845–1848)
- Anthimus IV (1848–1852), restored
- Germanus IV (1852–1853), restored
- Anthimus VI (1853–1855), restored 1st time
- Cyril VII, Ecumenical Patriarch (1855–1860)
- Joachim II, Ecumenical Patriarch (1860–1863)
- Sophronius III, Ecumenical Patriarch (1863–1866)
- Gregory VI (1867–1871), restored
- Anthimus VI (1871–1873), restored 2nd time
- Joachim II (1873–1878), restored
- Joachim III, Ecumenical Patriarch (1878–1884, 1901–1912)
- Joachim IV, Ecumenical Patriarch (1884–1887)
- Dionysius V, Ecumenical Patriarch (1887–1891)
- Neophytus VIII, Ecumenical Patriarch (1891–1894)
- Anthimus VII, Ecumenical Patriarch (1895–1896)
- Constantine V, Ecumenical Patriarch (1897–1901)

- Greek Orthodox Patriarchate of Alexandria –

- Parthenios II, Pope and Patriarch (1788–1805)
- Theophilos III, Pope and Patriarch (1805–1825)
- Ierotheos I, Pope and Patriarch (1825–1845)
- Artemios I, Pope and Patriarch (1845–1847)
- Ierotheos II, Pope and Patriarch (1847–1858)
- Kallinikos I, Pope and Patriarch (1858–1861)
- Iakovos I (or II), Pope and Patriarch (1861–1866)
- Chrysanthos of Pentapolis, Pope and Patriarch (1866–1866)
- Nikanor I, 0 (1866–1869)
- Evgenios Xiropotamitis, 0 (1866–1868)
- Nilos of Pentapolis (acting), 0 (1869–1869)
- Nilos I, 0 (1869–1870)
- ?, 0 (1870–0)
- Sophronios IV, 0 (1870–1899)
- Meletios Apostolopoulos, 0 (1899–1900)
- Photios I, 0 (1900–1925)

- Greek Orthodox Patriarchate of Antioch –

- Anthemios I, Patriarch (1792–1813)
- Seraphim I, Patriarch (1813–1823)
- Methodios I, Patriarch (1823–1850)
- Ierotheos I, Patriarch (1850–1885)
- Seraphim of Irinoupolis, Patriarch (1885–1885)
- Gerasimos I, 0 (1885–1891)
- Seraphim of Irinoupolis, 0 (1891–1891)
- Spyridon I, 0 (1891–1898)
- Germanos of Tarsos, 0 (1898–1899)
- ?, 0 (0–1898)
- Meletios of Laodikia, 0 (1898–1899)
- ?, 0 (0–1899)
- Meletios II, 0 (1899–1906)

- Greek Orthodox Patriarchate of Jerusalem –

- Anthimos I, Patriarch (1788–1808)
- Polykarpos I, Patriarch (1808–1827)
- Athanasios V, Patriarch (1827–1844)
- Kyrillos II, Patriarch (1845–1872)
- Prokopios of Petra, Patriarch (1872–1872)
- Prokopios II, Patriarch (1872–1875)
- Iosaph of Philadelphia, Patriarch (1875–1875)
- Ierotheos I, Patriarch (1875–1882)
- Nikiphoros of Petra, Patriarch (1882–1882)
- Photios I, Patriarch (1882–1883)
- Nikiphoros of Petra, Patriarch (1883–1883)
- Nikodimos I, Patriarch (1883–1890)
- Nikiphoros of Petra, Patriarch (1890–1891)
- Gerasimos I, Patriarch (1891–1897)
- Damianos of Philadelphia, Patriarch (1897–1897)
- Damianos I, Patriarch (1897–1918)

- Russian Orthodox Church (complete list) –

- Platon II, Metropolitan of Moscow (1775–1811)
- Avgustin, Metropolitan of Moscow (1811–1819)
- Serafim, Metropolitan of Moscow (1819–1821)
- Filaret, Metropolitan of Moscow (1821–1867)
- Innocent of Alaska, also Metropolitan of Moscow (1868–1879)
- Makary I, Metropolitan of Moscow (1879–1882)
- Ioanniky, Metropolitan of Moscow (1882–1891)
- Leonty, Metropolitan of Moscow (1891–1893)
- Sergy, Metropolitan of Moscow (1893–1898)
- Vladimir, Metropolitan of Moscow (1898–1912)
- Amvrosy, Metropolitan of St. Petersburg (1799–1818)
- Mikhail, Metropolitan of St. Petersburg (1818–1821)
- Serafim, Metropolitan of St. Petersburg (1821–1843)
- Antony, Metropolitan of St. Petersburg (1843–1848)
- Nikanor, Metropolitan of St. Petersburg (1848–1856)
- Grigory, Metropolitan of St. Petersburg (1856–1860)
- Isidor, Metropolitan of St. Petersburg (1860–1892)
- Pallady, Metropolitan of St. Petersburg (1892–1898)
- Antony, Metropolitan of St. Petersburg (1899–1912)

- Serbian Orthodox Church –

- Methodius, Metropolitan of Belgrade, (1791–1801)
- Leontije Lambrović, Metropolitan of Belgrade (1801–1810)
- Hadži Melentije Stevanović, Metropolitan of Belgrade (1810–1813)
- Dionisije II, Metropolitan of Belgrade (1813–1815)
- Agathangelus, Metropolitan of Belgrade (1815–1825)
- Melentije Pavlović, Metropolitan of Belgrade (1815–1816)
- Kiril, Metropolitan of Belgrade (1825–1827)
- Antim, Metropolitan of Belgrade (1827–1830)

- Serbian Orthodox Church –

- Melentije Pavlović, Metropolitan of Serbia (1831–1833)
- Petar Jovanović, Metropolitan of Serbia (1833–1859)
- Mihailo Jovanović, Metropolitan of Serbia (1859–1881)
- Mojsije Veresić of Timok, Metropolitan of Serbia (1881–1883)
- Teodosije Mraović, Metropolitan of Serbia (1883–1889)
- Mihailo Jovanović, Metropolitan of Serbia (1889–1898)
- Inokentije Pavlović, Metropolitan of Serbia (1898–1905)

- Serbian Orthodox Church inside Austrian Empire –

- Stefan Stratimirović, (1790–1836)
- Stefan Stanković, (1836–1837)
- Stefan Stanković, (1837–1841)
- Georgije Hranislav, (1841–1842)
- Josif Rajačić, (1842–1848)
- Josif Rajačić, Metropolitan of Karlovci and Patriarch of the Serb (1848–1861)
- Samuilo Maširević, Metropolitan of Karlovci and Patriarch of the Serb (1861–1870)
- Arsenije Stojković, Metropolitan of Karlovci and Patriarch of the Serb (1870–1872)
- Nikanor Grujić, Metropolitan of Karlovci and Patriarch of the Serb (1872–1874)
- Prokopije Ivačković, Metropolitan of Karlovci and Patriarch of the Serb (1874–1879)
- German Anđelić, Metropolitan of Karlovci and Patriarch of the Serb (1879–1888)
- Georgije Branković, Metropolitan of Karlovci and Patriarch of the Serb (1888–1907)

- Romanian Orthodox Church –

- Dositheos, Metropolitan of Hungaro-Walachia (1793–1810)
- Ignatios II, Metropolitan of Hungaro-Walachia (1810–1812)
- Nektarios, Metropolitan of Hungaro-Walachia (1812–1819)
- Dionysios II, Metropolitan of Hungaro-Walachia (1819–1821)
- Grigorios III, Metropolitan of Hungaro-Walachia (1823–1834)
- Commission, Metropolitan of Hungaro-Walachia (1834–1840)
- Ilarion of Arges, Metropolitan of Hungaro-Walachia (0–0)
- Neophytos of Ramnic, Metropolitan of Hungaro-Walachia (0–0)
- Kaisarios of Buzău, Metropolitan of Hungaro-Walachia (0–0)
- Neophytos II, Metropolitan of Hungaro-Walachia (1840–1849)
- Nifon II, Metropolitan of Hungaro-Walachia (1850–1865)
- Nifon, Metropolitan of Hungaro-Walachia and Primate of All Romania (1865–1875)
- Calinic, Metropolitan of Hungaro-Walachia and Primate of All Romania (1875–1886)
- Iosif, Metropolitan of Hungaro-Walachia and Primate of All Romania (1886–1893)
- Ghenadie, Metropolitan of Hungaro-Walachia and Primate of All Romania (1893–1896)
- Iosif, Metropolitan of Hungaro-Walachia and Primate of All Romania (1896–1909)

- Bulgarian Orthodox Church –

- Mattheos, Metropolitan of Turnovo (1797–1802)
- Daniil, Metropolitan of Turnovo (1802–1805)
- Makarios II, Metropolitan of Turnovo (1806–1817)
- Ioannikios, Metropolitan of Turnovo (1817–1821)
- Ilarion, Metropolitan of Turnovo (1821–1827)
- Konstantios, Metropolitan of Turnovo (1827–1830)
- Ilarion, Metropolitan of Turnovo (1830–1838)
- Panaretos, Metropolitan of Turnovo (1838–1840)
- Neophytos, Metropolitan of Turnovo (1840–1846)
- Athanasios II, Metropolitan of Turnovo (1846–1848)
- Neophytos, Metropolitan of Turnovo (1848–1858)
- Grigorios, Metropolitan of Turnovo (1858–1878)
- ?, Metropolitan of Turnovo (1872–0)
- Ilarion, Exarch of the Bulgarian (1872–1872)
- Antim, Exarch of the Bulgarian (1872–1877)
- Iosif, Exarch of the Bulgarian (1877–1915)

- Georgian Orthodox Church –

- Anton II, Catholicos-Patriarch of Georgia (1788–1811)
- Varlaam, Exarch of Georgia (1811–1817)
- Theophilakt, Exarch of Georgia (1817–1821)
- Iona, Exarch of Georgia (1821–1832)
- Moisey, Exarch of Georgia (1832–1834)
- Evgeniy, Exarch of Georgia (1834–1844)
- Isidor, Exarch of Georgia (1844–1858)
- Evseviy, Exarch of Georgia (1858–1877)
- Ioannikiy, Exarch of Georgia (1877–1882)
- Pavel, Exarch of Georgia (1882–1887)
- Palladiy, Exarch of Georgia (1887–1892)
- Vladimir, Exarch of Georgia (1892–1898)
- Flavian, Exarch of Georgia (1898–1901)

- Orthodox Church of Cyprus –

- Chrysanthos, Archbishop of Nea Justiniana and All Cypru (1784–1810)
- Kyprianos, Archbishop of Nea Justiniana and All Cypru (1810–1821)
- Ioakim, Archbishop of Nea Justiniana and All Cypru (1821–1824)
- Damaskinos, Archbishop of Nea Justiniana and All Cypru (1824–1827)
- Panaretos, Archbishop of Nea Justiniana and All Cypru (1827–1840)
- Ioannikios, Archbishop of Nea Justiniana and All Cypru (1840–1849)
- Kyrillos I, Archbishop of Nea Justiniana and All Cypru (1849–1854)
- Makarios I, Archbishop of Nea Justiniana and All Cypru (1854–1865)
- Sophronios III, Archbishop of Nea Justiniana and All Cypru (1865–1900)
- vacant, Archbishop of Nea Justiniana and All Cypru (1900–1908)

- Orthodox Church of Greece –

- Grigorios III, Metropolitan of Athens (1799–1820)
- Dionysios II, Metropolitan of Athens (1820–1823)
- vacant, Metropolitan of Athens (1823–1827)
- Grigorios IV, Metropolitan of Athens (1827–1828)
- Anthimos VII, Metropolitan of Athens (1828–1833)
- Neophytos V, Metaxas, Metropolitan of Athens and All Greece (1833–1862)

- Misail, Metropolitan of Athens and All Greece (1862–1862)
- Theophilos, Metropolitan of Athens and All Greece (1862–1873)
- Prokopios I Georgiadis, Metropolitan of Athens and All Greece (1874–1889)
- Germanos II Kalligas, Metropolitan of Athens and All Greece (1889–1896)
- Prokopios II Oikonomidis, Metropolitan of Athens and All Greece (1896–1901)

- Albanian Orthodox Church –

- Efthymios, Metropolitan of Durrës and Gora (1783–1805)
- Samouil, Metropolitan of Durrës and Gora (1805–1820)
- Chrysanthos, Metropolitan of Durrës and Gora (1820–1833)
- Gerasimos, Metropolitan of Durrës and Gora (1833–1837)
- Anthimos II, Metropolitan of Durrës and Gora (0–1844)
- Anthimos III, Metropolitan of Durrës and Gora (1844–1845)
- Ioannikios, Metropolitan of Durrës and Gora (1845–1858)
- Gennadios, Metropolitan of Durrës and Gora (1858–1858)
- Afxentios, Metropolitan of Durrës and Gora (1858–1859)
- Iosiph, Metropolitan of Durrës and Gora (1859–1867)
- Vissarion, Metropolitan of Durrës and Gora (1867–1899)
- Prokopios, Metropolitan of Durrës and Gora (1899–1906)

- Orthodox Church in America –
  - List of primates of the Orthodox Church in America
- Orthodox Church of Mount Sinai –

- Konstantios II, Archbishop of Sinai (1804–1859)
- Kyrillos II, Archbishop of Sinai (1859–1867)
- Kallistratos, Archbishop of Sinai (1867–1885)
- Porphyrios I, Archbishop of Sinai (1885–1904)

- Montenegrin Orthodox Church –

- Petar I, Metropolitan (vladika) (1782–1830)
- Petar II, Metropolitan (vladika) (1830–1851)
- Pero Petrović-Njegoš, Metropolitan (vladika) (1851–1852)
- Danilo II, Metropolitan (vladika) (1852–1852)
- Nikanor Ivanović-Njegoš, Metropolitan (1853–1860)
- Ilarion Roganović, Metropolitan (1860–1882)
- Visarion III Ljubisa, Metropolitan (1882–1884)
- Mitrofan Ban, Metropolitan (1884–1920)

- Orthodox Church of Japan –

- Nicholas, Bishop (1880–1906)
- Nicholas, Metropolitan of All Japan (1906–1912)

- Ukrainian Orthodox Church (Moscow Patriarchate) –
  - Ukrainian Orthodox Church (Moscow Patriarchate) § List of Primates
- Orthodox Church of Macedonia / under Patriarchate of Constantinople –

- Anthimos III, Metropolitan of Skopje (1799–1820)
- Ioasaph, Metropolitan of Skopje (1820–1823)
- Ananias, Metropolitan of Skopje (1823–1828)
- Neophytos, Metropolitan of Skopje (1828–1831)
- Gennadios, Metropolitan of Skopje (1831–1832)
- Gavriil III, Metropolitan of Skopje (1832–1844)
- Ioakim, Metropolitan of Skopje (1844–1868)
- Paisios, Metropolitan of Skopje (1868–1891)
- Methodios II, Metropolitan of Skopje (1891–1896)
- Amvrosios Stavrinos, Αμβρόσιος Σταυρινός, Амвросиос Ставринос, Metropolitan of Skopje (1896–1899)
- Firmilianos, Фирмилиан, Metropolitan of Skopje (1899–1903)Dean of Theological School of Bengrade

- Old Believers –

- Sofrony, Archbishop of Moscow (1847–1863)
- Antony, Archbishop of Moscow (1863–1881)
- Antony Guslitsky (in opposition), Archbishop of Moscow (1863–1870)
- Iov (in opposition), Archbishop of Moscow (1871–1912)
- Savvaty, Archbishop of Moscow (1881–1898)
- Ioann, Archbishop of Moscow (1898–1915)

=== Oriental Orthodoxy ===
- Armenian Apostolic Church –

- Hovsep' Arlut'ean, Catholicose of All Armenian (1800–1801)
- Dawit' V, Catholicose of All Armenian (1801–1807)
- Daniel (in opposition), Catholicose of All Armenian (1802–1808)
- Yeprem, Catholicose of All Armenian (1810–1830)
- Hovhannes VIII, Catholicose of All Armenian (1831–1842)
- Nerses V, Catholicose of All Armenian (1843–1857)
- Matevos I, Catholicose of All Armenian (1858–1865)
- Gevorg IV, Catholicose of All Armenian (1866–1882)
- vacant, Catholicose of All Armenian (1882–1885)
- Makar, Catholicose of All Armenian (1885–1891)
- Mkrtich, Catholicose of All Armenian (1892–1907)

- Simeon V, Catholicose of Aluank' (1794–1810)
- Sargis Hasan-Jalalean, Catholicose of Aluank' (1810–1815)

- Armenian Apostolic Church –

- Giragos I, Catholicose of Cilicia (1797–1822)
- Yeprem II, Catholicose of Cilicia (1822–1833)
- Mikael II, Catholicose of Cilicia (1833–1855)
- Giragos II, Catholicose of Cilicia (1855–1865)
- Giragos, Catholicose of Cilicia (1866–1871)
- Mkrtich I, Catholicose of Cilicia (1871–1894)
- Grigor (acting), Catholicose of Cilicia (1895–0)

- Coptic Orthodox Church, (List of Coptic Popes|complete list) –

- Mark VIII, Pope and Patriarch (1797–1810)
- Peter VII, Pope and Patriarch (1810–1852)
- vacant (1852–1854)
- Cyril IV, Pope and Patriarch (1854–1861)
- Demetrius II, Pope and Patriarch (1862–1870)
- Markos of Alexandria and Beheirah, Pope and Patriarch (1870–1874)
- Cyril V, Pope and Patriarch (1874–1927)

- Ethiopian Church –

- Yosab, Metropolitan of Ethiopia (1770–1803)
- vacant (1803-1808)
- Makarios, Metropolitan of Ethiopia (c. 1808)
- vacant (1808-1816)
- Kyrillos III, Metropolitan of Ethiopia (1816–1829)
- vacant (1829-1841)
- Salama III, Metropolitan of Ethiopia (1841–1866)
- vacant (1866-1868)
- Atnatewos II, Metropolitan of Ethiopia (1868–1876)
- Petros VII, Metropolitan of Ethiopia (1876–1889)
- Mattheos, Metropolitan of Ethiopia (1889–1926)

- Syriac Orthodox Church –

- Ignatius Matthew, Patriarch of Antioch and All the East (1782–1817)
- Ignatius Yunan, Patriarch of Antioch and All the East (1817–1819)
- Ignatius George V, Patriarch of Antioch and All the East (1819–1836)
- Ignatius Elias II, Patriarch of Antioch and All the East (1838–1847)
- Ignatius Jacob II, Patriarch of Antioch and All the East (1847–1871)
- Ignatius Peter IV, Patriarch of Antioch and All the East (1872–1894)
- Ignatius Abdul Masih II, Patriarch of Antioch and All the East (1895–1905)

- Malabar Independent Syrian Church –

- Kattumanghattu Abraham Koorilos I, Metropolitan (1772–1802)
- Geevargheese Koorilose II, Metropolitan (1802–1807)
- Zacharia Philexenos I, Metropolitan (1807–1811)
- Geevarghese Philexenos II, Metropolitan (1811–1829)
- Geevarghese Koorilose III, Metropolitan (1829–1856)
- Joseph Koorilose IV, Metropolitan (1856–1888)
- Joseph Athanasius I, Metropolitan (1888–1898)
- Geevarghese Koorilose V, Metropolitan (1898–1935)

=== Protestantism ===
==== Baptist ====
- National Baptist Convention, USA, Inc. —

- W. H. Alpine, President (1880–1882)
- J. Q. A. Wilhite, President (1882–1883)
- J. A. Foster, President (1883–1884)
- W. A. Brinkley, President (1884–1885)
- William J. Simmons, President (1885–1890)
- E. W. Brawley, President (1890–1891)
- M. Vann, President (1891–1893)
- Elias Camp Morris, President (1895–1922)

- Union of the Russian Baptists —

- Johann Wieler, President (1884–1887)
- Dey Mazayev, President (1887–1909)

==== Lutheran ====
- Lutheran Church–Missouri Synod –

- Carl Ferdinand Wilhelm Walther, President (1847–1850; 1864–1878)
- Friedrich Conrad Dietrich Wyneken, President (1850–1864)
- Heinrich Christian Schwan, President (1878–1899)
- Franz August Otto Pieper, President (1899–1911)

- Wisconsin Evangelical Lutheran Synod –

- Johannes Muehlhaeuser, President (1849–1860)
- John Bading, President (1860–1864)
- Gottlieb Reim, President (1864–1865)
- William Streissguth, President (1865–1867)
- John Bading, President (1867–1887)
- Phillip von Rohr, President (1887–1908)

- Swedish Church –

- Uno von Troil, Archbishop of Uppsala (1786–1803)
- Jacob Axelsson Lindblom, Archbishop of Uppsala (1805–1819)
- Carl von Rosenstein, Archbishop of Uppsala (1819–1836)
- Johan Olof Wallin, Archbishop of Uppsala (1837–1839)
- Carl Fredrik af Wingård, Archbishop of Uppsala (1839–1851)
- Hans Olof Holmström, Archbishop of Uppsala (1852–1855)
- Henrik Reuterdahl, Archbishop of Uppsala (1856–1870)
- Anton Niklas Sundberg, Archbishop of Uppsala (1870–1900)
- Johan August Ekman, Archbishop of Uppsala (1900–1913)

- Finnish Church –

- Jakob Gadolin, Bishop of Turku (1788–1802)
- Jakob Tengström, Bishop of Turku (1803–1817), Bishop (1817–1832)
- Erik Gabriel Melartin, Bishop (1833–1847)
- Edvard Bergenheim, Bishop (1850–1884)
- Torsten Thure Renvall, Bishop (1884–1898)
- Gustaf Johansson, Bishop (1899–1930)

==== Other Protestant ====
- Christian and Missionary Alliance –

- Albert Benjamin Simpson, Founder and President (1887–1919)

- Seventh-day Adventists –

- John Byington, President of the General Conference (1863–1865)
- James White, President of the General Conference (1865–1867; 1869–1871; 1874–1880
- J. N. Andrews, President of the General Conference (1867–1869)
- George I. Butler, President of the General Conference (1871–1874; 1880–1888)
- Ole Andres Olsen, President of the General Conference (1888–1897)
- George A. Irwin, President of the General Conference (1897–1901)

- Salvation Army (complete list) –

- William Booth, Founder and General (1865–1912)

- New Apostolic Church –

- Fritz Krebs, Chief apostle (1895–1905)

=== Anglicanism ===
- Church of England –

- Formal leadership: Supreme Governor of the Church of England (complete list) –

- George III, Supreme Governor (1760–1820)
- George IV, Supreme Governor (1820–1830)
- William IV, Supreme Governor (1830–1837)
- Victoria, Supreme Governor (1837–1901)

- Effective leadership: Archbishops of Canterbury (complete list) –

- John Moore, Archbishop (1783–1805)
- Charles Manners-Sutton, Archbishop (1805–1828)
- William Howley, Archbishop (1828–1848)
- John Bird Sumner, Archbishop (1848–1862)
- Charles Thomas Longley, Archbishop (1862–1868)
- Archibald Campbell Tait, Archbishop (1868–1882)
- Edward White Benson, Archbishop (1883–1896)
- Frederick Temple, Archbishop (1896–1902)

- Anglican Church of Australia (complete list)–

- William Broughton, Primate (1847–1853)
- Frederic Barker, Primate (1854–1853)
- Alfred Barry, Primate (1884–1889)
- Saumarez Smith, Primate (1890–1909)

- Episcopal Church (United States) (complete list) –

- William White, Presiding Bishop (1795–1836)
- Alexander Griswold, Presiding Bishop (1836–1843)
- Philander Chase, Presiding Bishop (1843–1852)
- Thomas Brownell, Presiding Bishop (1852–1865)
- John Hopkins, Presiding Bishop (1865–1868)
- Benjamin Smith, Presiding Bishop (1868–1884)
- Alfred Lee, Presiding Bishop (1884–1887)
- John Williams, Presiding Bishop (1887–1899)
- Thomas Clark, Presiding Bishop (1899–1903)

=== Other Christian or Christian-derived faiths ===
- Assyrian Church of the East, line 1 –

- Eliyya XIII Isho-Yab, Patriarch (1778–1804)

- Assyrian Church of the East, line 2 –

- Shimoun XVI Yohanan, Patriarch (1780–1820)
- Shimoun XVII Abraham, Patriarch (1820–1861)
- Shimoun XVIII Rouel, Patriarch (1861–1903)

- Latter Day Saint movement –

- Joseph Smith, President of the Church (1830–1844)

- The Church of Jesus Christ of Latter-day Saints

- Brigham Young, President of the Church (1847-1877)
- John Taylor, President of the Church (1880-1887)
- Wilford Woodruff, President of the Church (1889-1898)
- Lorenzo Snow, President of the Church (1898-1901)

- Church of Jesus Christ of Latter Day Saints (Strangite)

- James Strang, President and King (1844-1856)

- Reorganized Church of Jesus Christ of Latter Day Saints

- Joseph Smith III, Prophet-President of the Church (1860-1914)

== Islam ==
=== Sunni ===
- Ottoman Empire, (complete list) -

- Selim III, Caliph (1789–1807)
- Mustafa IV, Caliph (1807–1808)
- Mahmud II, Caliph (1808–1839)
- Abdülmecid I, Caliph (1839–1861)
- Abdülaziz, Caliph (1861–1876)
- Murad V, Caliph (1876)
- Abdul Hamid II, Caliph (1876–1909)

- Sokoto Caliphate, West Africa (complete list) -

- Usman dan Fodio, Caliph (1809–1817)
- Muhammed Bello, Caliph (1817–1837)
- Abu Bakr Atiku, Caliph (1837–1842)
- Ali Babba bin Bello, Caliph (1842–1859)
- Ahmadu Atiku, Caliph (1859–1866)
- Aliu Karami, Caliph (1866–1867)
- Ahmadu Rufai, Caliph (1867–1873)
- Abubakar II Atiku na Raba, Caliph (1873–1877)
- Mu'azu, Caliph (1877–1881)
- Umaru bin Ali, Caliph (1881–1891)
- Abdur Rahman Atiku, Caliph (1891–1902)

=== Shia ===
- Twelver Islam

- Imams (complete list) –

- Muhammad al-Mahdi, Imam (874–present) Shia belief holds that he was hidden by Allah in 874.
- Marja

- Muhammad Hasan al-Najafi(1843-1849)
- Murtadha al-Ansari(1849-1864)
- Mirza Shirazi(1864-1895)
- Muhammad Kazim Khurasani(1895-1911)

- Nizari Isma'ilism (complete list) –

- Shāh Khalīlullāh III, Imam (1792–1817)
- Aga Khan I, Imam (1818–1881)
- Aga Khan II, Imam (1881–1885)
- Aga Khan III, Imam (1885–1957)

- Zaidiyyah (complete list) –

- al-Mansur Ali I, Imam (1775–1809)
- al-Mutawakkil Ahmad, Imam (1809–1816)
- al-Mahdi Abdallah, Imam (1816–1835)
- al-Mansur Ali II, Imam (1835–1837, 1844–1845, 1849–1850, 1851)
- an-Nasir Abdallah, Imam (1837–1840)
- al-Hadi Muhammad, Imam (1840–1844)
- al-Mutawakkil Muhammad, Imam (1845–1849)
- al-Mansur Ahmad, Imam (1849–1853)
- al-Mu'ayyad Abbas, Imam (1850)
- al-Hadi Ghalib, Imam (1851–1852, 1858–1872)
- al-Mansur Muhammad bin Abdallah, Imam (1853)
- al-Mutawakkil al-Muhsin, Imam (1855–1878)
- al-Mansur al-Husayn III, Imam (1859–1863)
- al-Hadi Sharaf ad-Din, Imam (1878–1890)
- al-Mansur Muhammad bin Yahya Hamid ad-Din, Imam (1890–1904)

- Dawoodi Bohra –

- Abde Ali Saifuddin, Dai al-Mutlaq (1799–1817)
- Mohammed Ezzuddin, Dai al-Mutlaq (1817–1821)
- Tayyeb Zainuddin, Dai al-Mutlaq (1821–1836)
- Syedna Mohammed Badruddin, Dai al-Mutlaq (1836–1840)
- Abdul Qadir Najmuddin, Dai al-Mutlaq (1840–1885)
- Abdul Husain Husamuddin, Dai al-Mutlaq (1885–1891)
- Mohammad Burhanuddin, Dai al-Mutlaq (1891–1905)

=== Ahmadiyya ===
- Ahmadiyya –

- Mirza Ghulam Ahmad, founder (1889–1908)

== Judaism and related ==
- Chabad Hasidism –

- Shneur Zalman of Liadi, Lubavitcher Rebbe (1780–1812)
- Dovber Schneuri, Lubavitcher Rebbe (1812–1827)
- Menachem Mendel Schneersohn, Lubavitcher Rebbe (1827–1866)
- Shmuel Schneersohn, Lubavitcher Rebbe (1866–1882)
- Sholom Dovber Schneersohn, Lubavitcher Rebbe (1882–1920)

- British Empire (complete list) -

- Solomon Hirschell, Chief Rabbi (1802–1842)
- Nathan Marcus Adler, Chief Rabbi (1845–1890)
- Hermann Adler, Chief Rabbi (1891–1911)

- Ottoman Empire –

- Hayim Yakup Benyakar, Chief Rabbi (1800–1835)
- Abraham Levi, Chief Rabbi (1835–1839)
- Samuel Hayim, Chief Rabbi (1839–1841)
- Moiz Fresko, Chief Rabbi (1841–1854)
- Yakup Avigdor, Chief Rabbi (1854–1870)
- Yakir Geron, Chief Rabbi (1870–1872)
- Mose Levi, Chief Rabbi (1872–1909)

== Other ==
=== Baháʼí ===
- Baháʼí Faith –

- Bahá'u'lláh, founder of the Baháʼí Faith (1863–1892)
- `Abdu'l-Bahá, successor and head of the Baháʼí Faith (1892–1921)

== See also ==
- Religious leaders by year
- List of state leaders in the 19th century (1801–1850)
- List of state leaders in the 19th century (1851–1900)
- List of governors of dependent territories in the 19th century
