= Al-Mansur Muhammad =

Al-Mansur Muhammad could refer to the following people:

- Al-Mansur Nasir al-Din Muhammad, the Ayyubid sultan of Egypt (r. 1198–1200)
- Al-Mansur I Muhammad, the Ayyubid emir of Hama (r. 1191–1219)
- Al-Mansur II Muhammad, the Ayyubid emir of Hama (r. 1244–1284)
- Al-Mansur Muhammad, Sultan of Egypt (1347–1398), the Mamluk sultan of Egypt
- Al-Mansur Muhammad (died 1505), the Zaidi imam of Yemen in the 15th century
- Al-Mansur Muhammad bin Abdallah, the Zaidi imam of Yemen in the mid-19th century
- al-Mansur Muhammad bin Yahya Hamid ad-Din, the Zaidi imam of Yemen in 1890–1904
- al-Mansur Muhammad al-Badr, the Zaidi imam of Yemen in 1962
