= Al-Mansur al-Husayn III =

Al-Mansur al-Husayn III (died 1888) was a claimant to the dignity of imam of Yemen in 1859–1863, wielding power in intense rivalry with other self-proclaimed imams.

Al-Husayn bin Muhammad bin al-Hadi, known by the title al-Mansur, emerged at a time when the Zaidi imamate of Yemen was suffering a period of political chaos. The Tihamah lowland was ruled by the Ottoman Turks, while the highland was contested between several imams, such as al-Hadi Ghalib, al-Mansur Muhammad bin Abdallah and al-Mutawakkil al-Muhsin. After 1852, the capital city San'a was governed by the shaykh Ahmad al-Haymi, who was not a scholarly figure. Al-Haymi was considered a vicious personality, and in 1859 the population of San'a had enough and planned to assassinate the governor. Al-Haymi managed to slip away, intending to reach the Turks in the coastland, but was captured by Yemeni tribesmen. These delivered him into the hands of the newly proclaimed imam al-Mansur al-Husayn III who was based at at-Tawilah west of Kawkaban. The imam entered San'a with his captive. Al-Haymi was imprisoned, but he managed to spread propaganda among the common townsfolk, who destroyed the imam's house in Harat al-Filayhi. Thus al-Mansur al-Husayn was expelled from San'a in 1860. Later in the same year, the population appointed Muhsin Mu'id (d. 1881) as governor, while al-Mutawakkil al-Muhsin was formally acknowledged as imam. Al-Mutawakkil defeated his rival decisively in 1863, and again in either 1865 or 1867. Al-Mansur al-Husayn III appears to have been among the old imams who welcomed the Ottoman governor Ahmad Mukhtar Pasha to San'a in April 1872. 16 years later he died in San'a.

== See also ==
- History of Yemen
- Imams of Yemen

Preceded by al-Hadi Ghalib	Zaydi Imam of Yemen; 1859–1860 (1863)	Succeeded by al-Mutawakkil al-Muhsin
