= Al-Mansur Ali II =

Al-Mansur Ali II may refer to:

- Al-Mansur Ali II, Imam of Yemen, the Zaidi imam of Yemen in the mid-19th century
- Al-Mansur Ali II, Sultan of Egypt, the Mamluk sultan (r. 1376–1382)
