= Al-Mansur Ahmad =

Al-Mansur Ahmad (died 1853) was a Zaydiyya imam who claimed the rulership over Yemen in the years 1849–1853. His strife-ridden career spelt the end of the Zaydi Imamate of Yemen as a coherent force.

== Background of the rebellion ==
In the 19th century, the shrinking resources of the Yemeni state, which had existed since the early 17th century, combined with religio-political strife to erode the authority of the ruling imams. In general terms, a Sunni-influenced element, which backed the imams of the Qasimi line, stood against traditional Hadawi (Zaydiyya) interests. The Hadawi imam an-Nasir Abdallah was murdered in 1840, and Sunni elements regained power. However, an-Nasir Abdullah's partisan Sayyid Husayn withdrew to Saada, north of the capital Sanaa, bringing a number of Hadawi ulema. One of his retainers was a younger scholar called Ahmad bin Hashim. He was a Sayyid, but not of the Qasimi line; rather, he was a 23rd-generation descendant of the imam al-Mansur Yahya (d. 976). Some time after the death of his patron, in 1847/48, Ahmad bin Hashim undertook a hijra, an emigration from tyrannical rule, of his own. Together with some ulema he left Sanaa for Saada. There he claimed the imamate in 1849.

== Capture of Sanaa ==
In Sanaa itself, an Ottoman invasion had just been repelled, but the new imam al-Mansur Ali II lacked proper qualifications for the dignity. This became the opportunity for Ahmad bin Hashim, who took the regnal title al-Mansur Ahmad. He gained a great following from the Hashid tribe and the tribal groups to the north-east. Elements which were dissatisfied with the Sunni-oriented style of the imam's court in Saana, backed the new claimant. The ulema of Sanaa, realizing the poor merits of al-Mansur Ali II, deposed him in favour of the scholarly al-Mu'ayyad Abbas (1850). The population of Sanaa, Dhamar and Yarim split into factions backing either Ali or Abbas. Under these circumstances, the followers of al-Mansur Ahmad were able to gain control over Sanaa in 1850. Al-Mu'ayyad Abbas took refuge in the citadel of the city, but was forced to capitulate.

== Failure to rule ==
The "rebellion" of al-Mansur Ahmad was made possible through the widespread discontent with the authoritarianism and extravagance of the ruling elite in Sanaa. Nevertheless, the enterprise soon proved unsuccessful. The action virtually destroyed the Qasimi state of Yemen, which was fragmented along tribal and regional lines. The tribal groups which had supported Al-Mansur Ahmad abandoned him soon after his accession. He was unable to pay them to ensure their loyalty, or to raise an army to gain control over the country. The previous incumbent, al-Mansur Ali II, made a new bid for Sanaa. The city was taken by his followers, although it quickly changed hands again to al-Hadi Ghalib (1851). Al-Mansur Ahmad's rule over Sanaa had only lasted for three months. His imamate thus lapsed into obscurity, and he had to flee to the Arhat tribe.

== See also ==
- History of Yemen
- Imams of Yemen

Preceded by al-Mu'ayyad Abbas	Zaydi Imam of Yemen; 1849 (1850)-1851 (1853)	Succeeded by al-Mansur Ali II
