= Milies School =

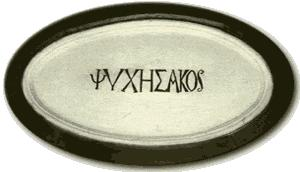
The sign "PSYCHIS AKOS" (Healing of the Soul) that was at the entrance of the library of the Milies School.

The Milies School or School of Milies was a Greek school that operated in the early 19th century in Milies of Pelion. The school was founded by Gregory Konstantas and Anthimos Gazis. At the school, in addition to the usual subjects, philosophy and the natural sciences were taught at a level advanced for the time. The founders' vision for it to function as a higher educational institution was not realized, as the 1821 Revolution intervened and the area of Pelion remained outside the boundaries of the first Greek state.

== History ==
=== Predecessors ===
The first teacher to teach in Milies of Pelion during the years of Ottoman rule was the hieromonk Anthimos Pantazis, the son of a priest, who had studied at the school of Zagora, where a certain Zacharias taught literary subjects. When, in 1770, a new teacher from Zagora, who had studied in Wallachia, returned to the area, Zacharias granted him the school. Anthimos persuaded Zacharias to move to Milies, where the two of them built the school "of Saint Nicholas the New" in 1773. Among many others, Daniel Philipidis, Gregory Konstantas, and Anthimos Gazis learned their first letters at this school.

=== Foundation ===
In 1811, Anthimos Pantazis passed away, and in a will he made a year before his death referring to the Great Church (Patriarchate of Constantinople), he bequeathed the ownership of the school to his beloved student, Gregory Konstantas. The announcement of the event found Konstantas in Constantinople, where he worked as a tutor for the nephew of the Metropolitan of Ephesus. This event caused his return to Milies, as he preferred to teach in his homeland. Konstantas accepted the will of Anthimos Pantazis and, with the blessings of Patriarch Jeremias IV and a Patriarchal sigil, the school operated as Patriarchal, and he departed for Milies.

Later, with his compatriot and relative Anthimos Gazis, and with the ambition to transform the school into a higher educational institution, on July 1, 1814, they co-signed a commitment to contribute not only their personal labor but also 500 gold coins each, to realize their joint effort in a newly constructed building. Konstantas had already begun teaching in the old building from 1812, indeed without pay. The new building was constructed under Konstantas's supervision near the old school. Construction began in 1813 and the inauguration took place on August 6, 1815. Gazis contributed to enriching the library by purchasing and promoting many books and several instruments for the visual teaching of the practical sciences. To raise funds, he established the "Philomusos Society of Vienna" with the aim that "the assembly of the mountain of Pelion will establish a regular school in imitation of the Academies of Europe." However, as Kamilaris notes, "the collected funds in Vienna were barely sufficient for the purchase of books." The books, however, were numerous and select, making the library of the school a unique achievement in Ottoman-occupied Greece. In the library, Konstantas, with his particular interest in archaeology, had created a small archaeological collection. The entrance of this rich library was adorned with the emblem "Healing of the Soul." The Milies School quickly gained a reputation as an important educational center. When, in 1817, Gazis arrived from Vienna to Milies, the building had been completed and was in operation. Gazis taught at the school until 1821 while dedicating much time to preparing for the Greek Revolution.

=== Educational program ===
The founders of the school, who through their education and their literary and publishing activities rightly rank among the figures of the Greek Enlightenment, sought to convey the ideas of the Enlightenment to their homeland. The curriculum of the school included Ancient Greek, the common language, Mathematics, Geography, Natural Sciences, Latin, and Italian, but also Philosophy at a higher level, as evidenced by the translations of Francesco Soave published by Konstantas and by the five-volume Greek Library of Gazis. Regarding the pedagogical method, the founders, aware of Pestalozzi's ideas, must have embraced pedagogical love. Furthermore, as Gazis published in Hermes the Scholar, the program would include "the Ethics of the Holy Gospel" and "the external ethical philosophy according to Socrates."

=== From the 1821 Revolution and beyond ===
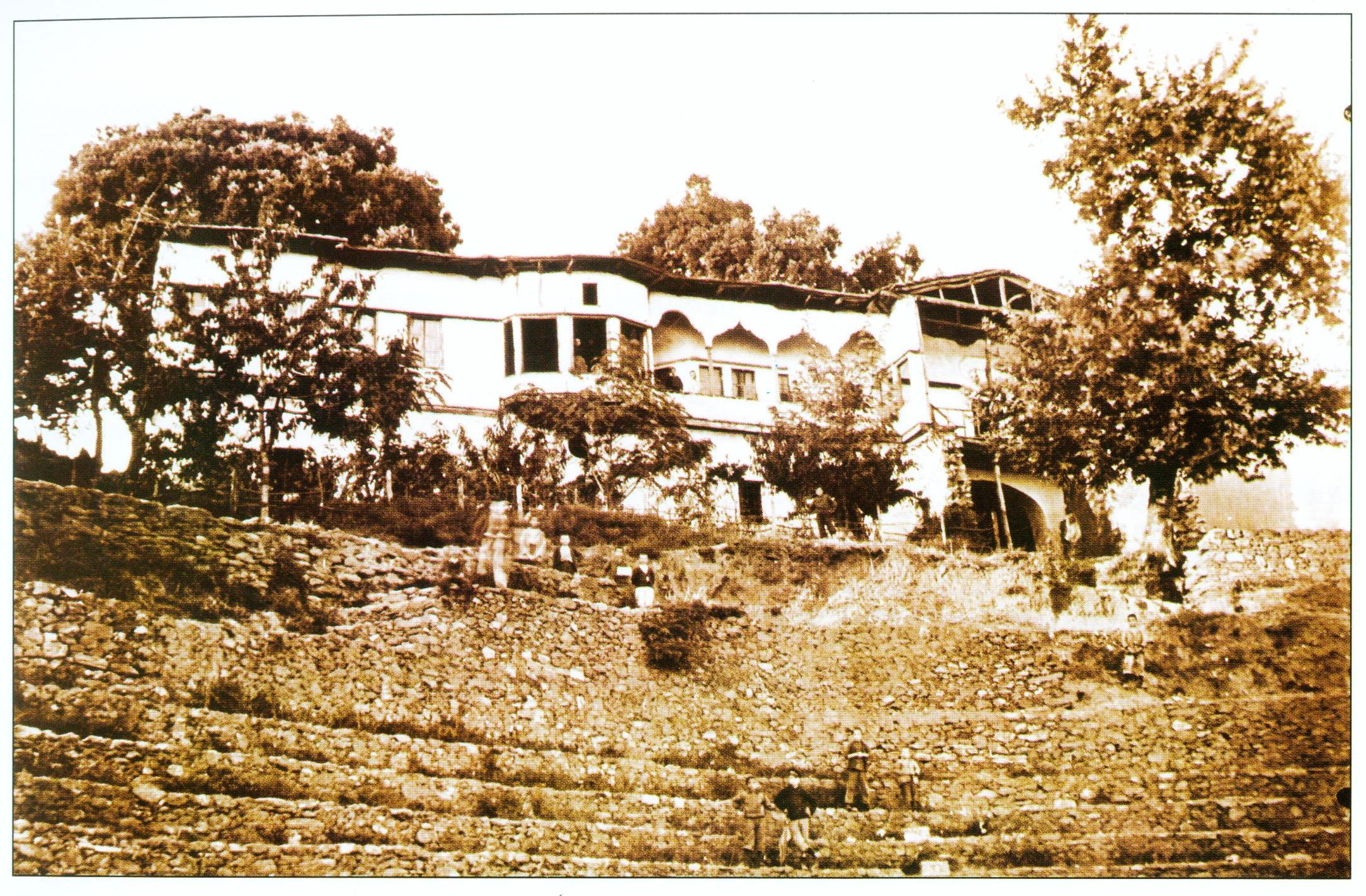
The Milies School around 1905.

In May 1821, Gazis proclaimed the revolution in the square of Milies. The ensuing military events forced both teachers, Konstantas and Gazis, to retreat further south, where they participated in government committees and National Assemblies. The Turks of Mahmud Pasha Dramali captured Milies and even burned part of the library.

The last period of operation of the Milies School coincides with Konstantas's return to Milies. When, in 1834, Gregory Konstantas realized that the government had decided to close the Orphanage of Aegina where he was teaching, sidelined by the administration of Otto, slandered by local figures, and disappointed by the lack of recognition of his contributions, perhaps out of necessity, as he was no longer provided resources, but also from the intense desire to continue the most important work of his life, he decided to return to his Ottoman-occupied homeland. There he continued to teach without pay for the last ten years of his life until his death on August 6, 1844. With his death, the Milies School ceased to operate.

After the liberation of Thessaly (1881), a primary school was housed in the building until 1943, when it was burned down by the Germans who set the village on fire. Today, modern school buildings have been constructed on the same site. The surviving books from the school formed the core of the present Public Library of Milies, Magnesia.

== Sources ==
- Alamani, Efi (1965). "Gregory Konstantas and His Archaeological Collection". Thessalian Chronicles. Athens: 609–612.
- Gazis, Anthimos (1813). "News from Bucharest". Hermes the Scholar (8 & 9): 115–116.
- Kamilaris, Rigas N. (1897). Biographies, Speeches, Letters of Gregory Konstantas. In Athens: A. Konstantinidou.
- Kapanis, Alexandros (April 27, 2021). "Demetrios D. Philipidis and Gregory Konstantas – The Enlightened Teachers of the Milies School". Thessaly. Volos.
- Mourtzanos, Themistocles (2009). Gregory Konstantas: Life and Work (Doctoral thesis). Aristotle University of Thessaloniki.
