= Al-Hadi Sharaf ad-Din =

- Born: 1820; Jeddah, Saudi Arabia
- Died: 8 June 1890 (aged 69–70)
- Education: Islamic sciences
- Occupation: Claimant

Al-Hadi Sharaf ad-Din (1820 – 8 June 1890) was a claimant for the Zaydi imamate of Yemen in the years 1878–1890, acting in opposition to the Ottoman occupiers of the country. His period saw a tribal embryo of a state taking form in the highlands of Yemen, which would be strengthened by his successors as imams, and eventually usher into the expulsion of the Ottoman Turks in the early 20th century.

== Imamate ==
=== Accession as resistance leader ===
Sharaf ad-Din bin Muhammad bin Abd ar-Rahman was a 14th-generation descendant of a medieval imam, al-Mu'ayyad Yahya (d. 1346). He was born in Jeddah while his Yemeni parents performed the hajj, and received a thorough education in the Islamic sciences. The Ottoman Turks occupied Sanaa in 1872 and brought an end to the old Zaydi state which had existed since 1597. The Imam al-Mutawakkil al-Muhsin refused to submit. He tried to resist the Turkish troops with limited success until his death in 1878. After him, Sharaf ad-Din performed the da'wa (summoning, bid for authority) in Jabal Ahnun which was known as a stronghold for Sayyids and religious scholars. He was elevated to the imamate with the name al-Hadi Sharaf ad-Din. He vowed to continue the struggle and moved to the city Saada north of Sanaa. In Saada he reinforced religious laws and encouraged qadis to act as judges and administrators in the nearby tribal areas. A fortress was constructed near the city, which became the seat of the imam's government. In Zaydi historiography, his name is sometimes ignored since he did not belong to the Qasimid family that usually provided the imams. He had at least one rival for the imamate, al-Mansur Muhammad (1853–1890). However, competition between the rivals was confined to verbal arguments.

=== The rebellion of 1884 ===
Turkish legislation by this time was influenced by European models. These so-called Tanzimat reforms were considered heretic by the locals of the Zaydi branch of Shi'a Islam. The pretender-imam was therefore able to keep up the struggle, although Yemen was too split along tribal and religious lines to launch a unified resistance. A concerted attack against the Turkish positions was launched in the summer of 1884, where al-Hadi Sharaf ad-Din strove to subjugate the well-watered regions to the north-west of Sanaa. He extended his control to the areas around Hajjah and Zafir in the highlands. The Turkish troops besieged Zafir for seven months before the imam's followers withdrew.

=== Setbacks and further struggle ===
For a time, the Ottoman governor Izzet Pasha (1882–1884) was able to bring strong pressure on the imam. Izzet assumed control over as-Sudah and chased the imam from the strong fortress Shaharah, which was the key to Saada in the north. The German traveller Eduard Glaser who visited Yemen in 1884 summarized the situation at that time, and described al-Hadi Sharaf ad-Din as a leader of fanatics. At the time of his visit the area controlled by the Turks was restricted to a line between Luhayyah and Hajjah, together with `Amran, Sanaa, Dhamar, Rada, Qa'tabah and the land between Taiz and Mokha. The highland tribes Hashid and Bakil were hostile to the Ottoman rule, as was the land to the east and north of Sanaa. Al-Hadi Sharaf ad-Din finally died in Sa'dah in 1890, and was buried in Jabal Ahnun. In July in the same year the ulema appointed his brother-in-law Muhammad bin Yahya Hamid ad-Din as their new imam, continuing the anti-Turkish struggle.

== See also ==
- History of Yemen
- Decline of the Ottoman Empire

Preceded by al-Mutawakkil al-Muhsin	Zaydi Imam of Yemen; 1878–1890	Succeeded by Muhammad bin Yahya Hamid ad-Din
