= Al-Mu'ayyad Abbas =

Al-Mu'ayyad Abbas (died 1880) was an Imam of Yemen who ruled briefly in 1850. He belonged to the Qasimi family, descendants of the Islamic prophet Muhammad, who dominated the Zaidi imamate of Yemen between 1597 and 1962. Abbas bin Abd ar-Rahman was a scholar who descended from Imam al-Mutawakkil Isma'il (d. 1676) in the sixth generation. He was a disciple of the renowned Yemeni scholar Muhammad ash-Shawkani. After the abortive Ottoman intervention in highland Yemen in 1849, the remains of the Zaidi state became the prey of political rivalries. The current imam al-Mansur Ali II was an alcoholic and commanded little respect; tribal groups rebelled, and the court in San'a was dominated by the oppressive minister al-Misri. Certain Sayyids and qadis in San'a defected to Sa'dah far to the north, where al-Mansur Ahmad bin Hashim posed as imam. Al-Mansur Ahmad besieged San'a in 1850. However, the elite of San'a chose Abbas as their imam, under the name al-Mu'ayyad Abbas (June 1850). The new imam appointed Muhammad ash-Shawkani's son Ahmad as his qadi. His soldiers and emirs held out for a while against the attackers in the qasr (fortress) of the city. Finally he had to surrender to al-Mansur Ahmad and was imprisoned. The victor, however, could only maintain his position in San'a for three months before he was forced to flee to the Arhab tribe. In the following year 1851, the contenders for the Zaidi imamate agreed to appoint al-Hadi Ghalib. Al-Mu'ayyad Abbas withdrew to a life of scholarship and teaching until his demise in 1880.

== See also ==
- Imams of Yemen
- History of Yemen

Preceded by al-Mansur Ali II	Zaydi Imam of Yemen; 1850	Succeeded by al-Mansur Ahmad
