= Maṣna'at Māriya =

Archaeological site in Yemen

Coordinates: 14°30′N 44°15′E

Simple plan of Maṣnaˈat Māriya

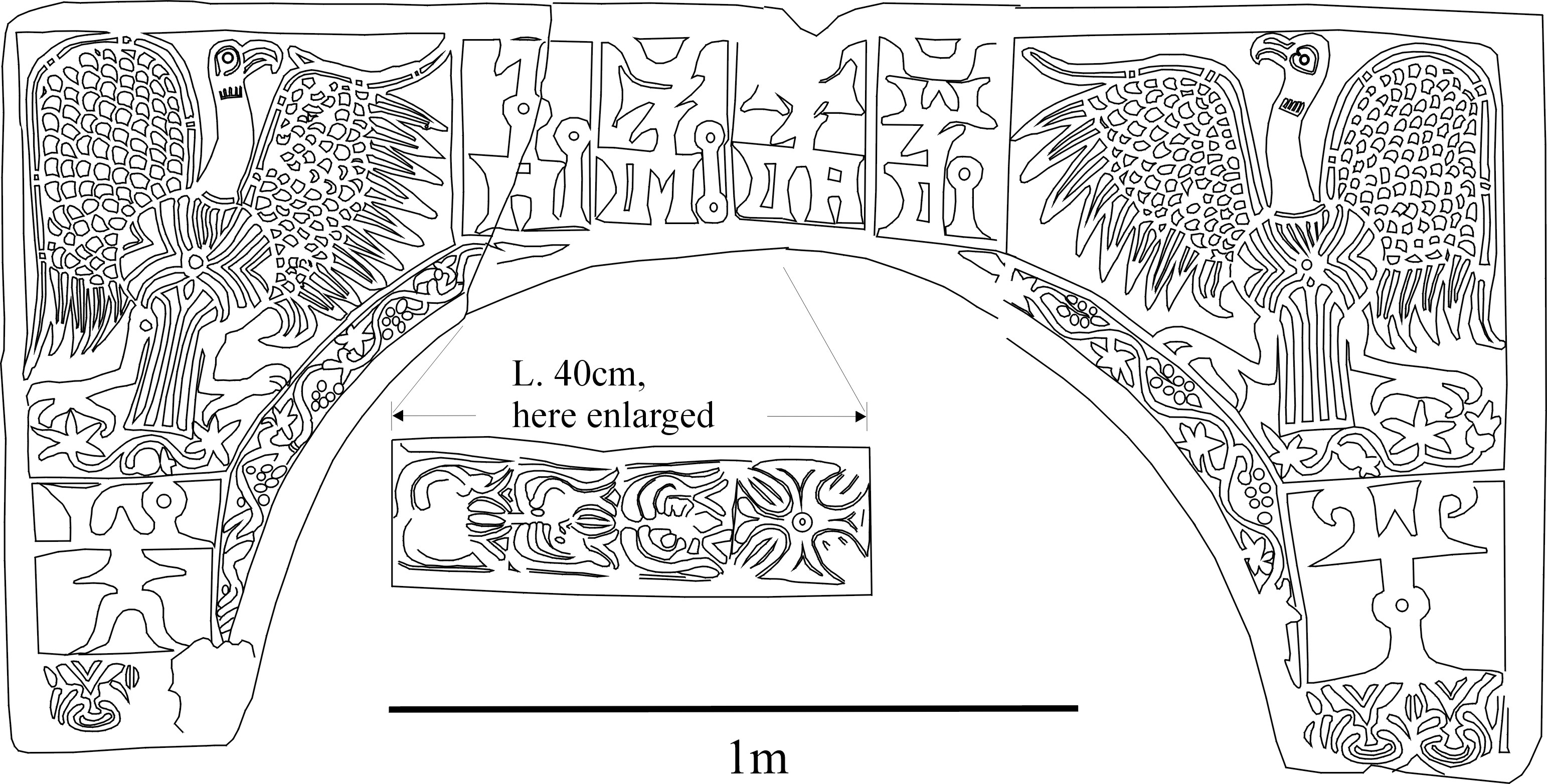
Vulture relief from Maṣna'at Māriya

Maṣnaʿat Māriya (Arabic: مصنعة مارية), is the name of an ancient South Arabian location in Dhamar Governorate, Yemen.

This ancient Himyarite archaeological site is one of the largest in the Yemen. In the local language the name means the fortress of Māriya. The meaning of the word is disputed. The site lies 11 km west of the town of Dhamar. It is important as a large escarpment site partly of late pre-Islamic date. Inside one of the four city gates there is a text written in Sabaic, describes the roads in the area.

== See also ==
- Zafar, Yemen
- Rulers of Sheba and Himyar
- Ancient history of Yemen
