= Muhammad bin Yahya Hamid ad-Din =

Imam of Yemen (1839–1904)

Muhammad bin Yahya Hamid ad-Din (Arabic: محمد بن يحيى حميد الدين; 1839 in Sana'a – 4 June 1904 in Qaflat Othor) was an imam of Yemen who led the resistance against the Ottoman occupation in 1890–1904.

== Outbreak of rebellion ==
Muhammad bin Yahya Hamid ad-Din was a descendant of the founder of the Zaidi state in Yemen, Imam al-Mansur al-Qasim (d. 1620). As a middle-aged scholar, he experienced the Ottoman occupation of highland Yemen in 1872. In 1876, Muhammad and other religious leaders of Sana'a were arrested by the Turks due to a dispute with the Ottoman authorities. They were brought to Hudaydah where they were kept under surveillance for two years. Muhammad survived the exile and returned to Sana'a. Meanwhile, Zaidi resistance was kept alive by local groups including the followers of imams al-Mutawakkil al-Muhsin (d. 1878) and al-Hadi Sharaf ad-Din (d. 1890). These were unable to threaten Turkish rule in Sana'a and the coastland, although large parts of the highlands could not be controlled by the Ottoman administration.

After the death of al-Hadi Sharaf ad-Din, the Zaidi ulema agreed to choose his brother-in-law Muhammad bin Yahya Hamid ad-Din, for lack of more suitable candidates. On being summoned, Muhammad left Sana'a for Sa'dah further to the north, where resistance was based. It was around this time in 1890 that Muhammad had claimed the title of Imam of the Imammate from 1890. He had access to the treasury of his predecessor, which facilitated his leadership. He allotted stipends of grain and money to the ulema, and circulated letters among the tribesmen. He was able to stir up most of the northern tribes against the Turkish officials and troops. A number of towns and forts around Sana'a, such as Hajjah, Yarim and Dhamar, were captured by the imam's followers. In 1892 Sana'a itself was besieged for a while by rebel troops. The initial successes of Muhammad's followers decreased the prestige of the Turks, already unpopular through extortions and maladministration.

== Religious basis of resistance ==
Although the Turks were able to prevail, they were never able to regain the military initiative. Reinforcements of troops could not stop the expansion of Muhammad bin Yahya Hamid ad-Din's sphere of influence. The hit-and-run tactics of the tribesmen wore out the Ottoman militaries. Sultan Abdul Hamid II sent messages to Muhammad in 1891 and 1896, asking him to submit and accept a stipend and an Ottoman rank. Muhammad flatly declined the offers. He replied that his aim was not political power for its own sake, but rather the implementation of sharia law, protection of the people from rapacious officials, and the prohibition of wine consumption and prostitution. The Turkish officials were alleged to act against Islamic precepts. In other words, Muhammad was able to frame his resistance in the professed protection of religion, against the secular and Western-influenced Turks.

Imamic resistance continued with new outbreaks of fighting in 1898. In the following year the imam asked the Sultan of Lahej in South Yemen to ask the British in Aden for protection. This did not lead to any results. Although his authority was not uncontested, Muhammad bin Yahya Hamid ad-Din was generally able to revive the glories of the early Qasimid imams. He put an end to customary laws in most of the northern tribal areas, organized stipends for men of religion, and alms for widows, orphans and teachers. He died in 1904, leaving a son, Yahya Muhammad Hamid ed-Din, who was accepted as his successor as imam. Yahya would eventually drive the Turks out of Yemen in 1918.

== See also ==
- Imams of Yemen
- History of Yemen
- Decline of the Ottoman Empire
- Tanzimat

Preceded by al-Hadi Sharaf ad-Din	Zaydi Imam of Yemen; 1890–1904	Succeeded by Yahya Muhammad Hamid ed-Din
