= Aghrab Beni Awad =

Aghrab Beni Awad is a village in the county of Bada'an, Province of Ibb, in the Republic of Yemen. Aghrab is famous for its agriculture and high school, Shohatee High School.
