= Al-Hadi Muhammad =

Al-Hadi Muhammad (Arabic: الهادي محمد; died 10 January 1844) was an Imam of Yemen who ruled in 1840–1844. He was a member of the Qasimid family, descendants of the Islamic prophet Muhammad, which dominated the Zaydi imamate of Yemen from 1597 to 1962.

Sidi Muhammad bin Ahmad was a son of Imam al-Mutawakkil Ahmad (d. 1816). He held a prominent position at the court of his nephew al-Mansur Ali II. When the latter was deposed by an-Nasir Abdallah, Sidi Muhammad was put in confinement together with him. After the murder of an-Nasir Muhammad in 1840, he was released and raised to the imamate, taking the name al-Hadi Muhammad. In the same year, the Egyptian troops, who had been present in the lowlands (Tihamah) since 1833, withdrew from Yemen. Instead the chief of Abu Arish, Sharif Husayn bin Ali bin Haidar (d. 1851), took power in the Tihamah and allied with Aidh, chief of Asir. Unruly conditions in the lowlands eroded the economy of coastal cities such as Mokha, and many city-dwellers migrated to British Aden. Al-Hadi Muhammad managed to recover Mokha and Taiz in 1841. He repeatedly asked the British authorities in Aden for assistance to take back lands rightfully belonging to the Zaydi state. The British declined this, and in 1843 the Porte formally appointed Husayn pasha over the areas under his sway. In reality, Husayn ruled according to his own will. Al-Hadi Muhammad lacked resources to act against this, and died in 1844. He was succeeded by his nephew al-Mansur Ali II.

== See also ==
- History of Yemen

Preceded by an-Nasir Abdallah	Zaydi Imam of Yemen; 1840–1844	Succeeded by al-Mansur Ali II
