= Al-Sahul =

Coordinates: 14.0883°N 44.1765°E

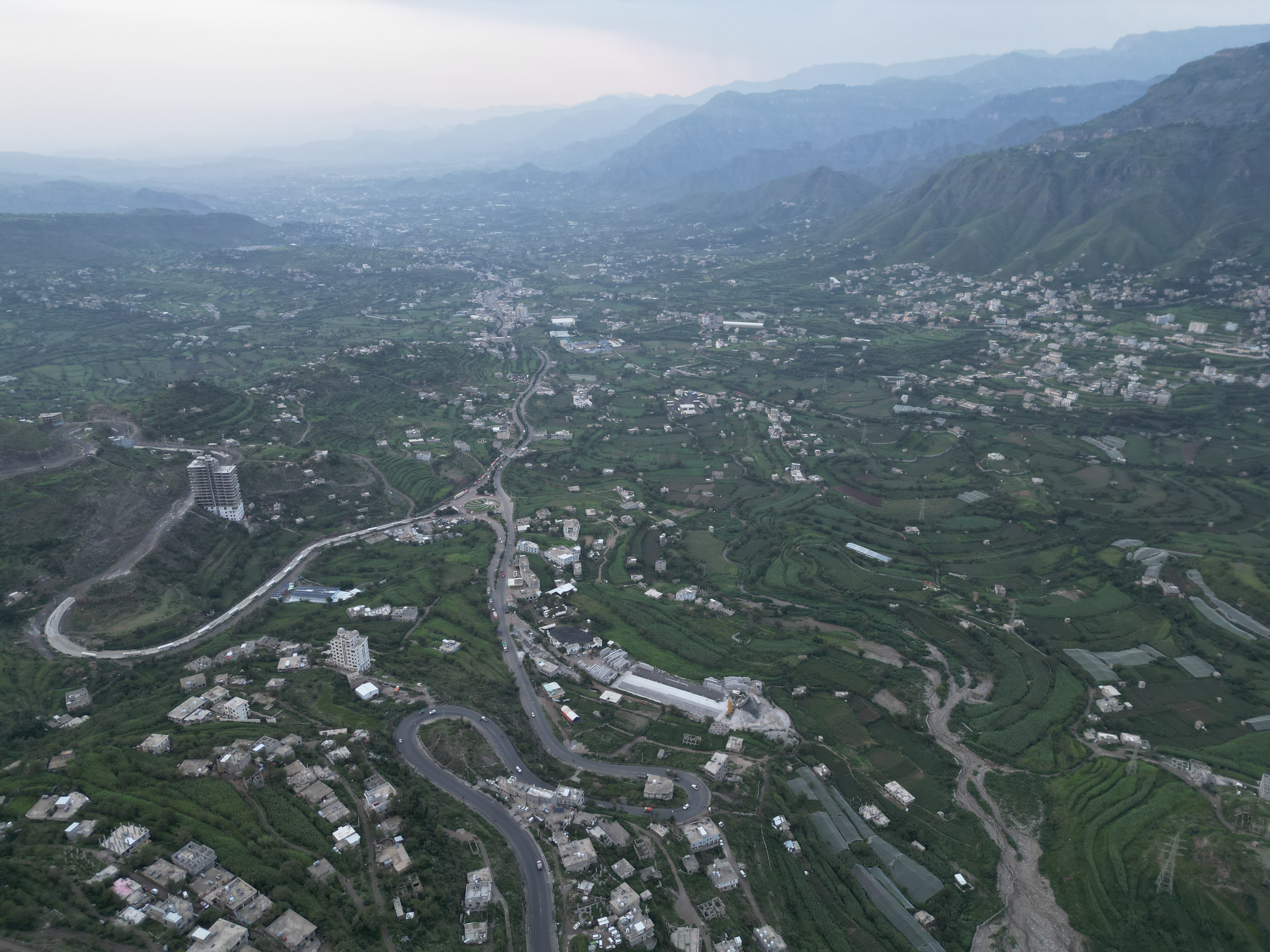
Al-Sahul region

Al-Saḥūl (Arabic: وادي السحول) is both a town and a wadi located between the city of Ibb and al-Makhadir District in Ibb Governorate, Yemen. It was known as Mikhlaf as-Saḥūl, "mikhlaf" being the name of administrative divisions in ancient Yemen. Al-Sahul was called Miṣr al-Yaman (The Egypt of Yemen) because of its abundance of corn. It is famous for its inhabitants' white cotton clothes, the Saḥūlīyya or Saḥūlī. According to Hadith, the Islamic prophet Muhammad was "shrouded in three Saḥūlī white cotton garments none of which was a long shirt or turban." According to the British orientalist James Heyworth-Dunne, As-Saḥūl was also known globally for its "exquisite striped cloaks".

The As-Saḥūl Valley is inhabited by the Sharʿab tribe, the Waḥaḍah tribe, and clans of al-Kalaʿ.

Mikhlaf As-Saḥūl previously had other names, such as "Mikhlaf Ja'far" after Ja'far al-Manakhi, the founder of the Manakhis Emirate, and "Mikhlaf al-Kalaʿ".
