= Al-Mutawakkil al-Muhsin =

Al-Mutawakkil al-Muhsin (died July 29, 1878) was an Imam who claimed the Zaidi state of Yemen in 1855–1878, in rivalry with several other contenders and with the invading Turks. His highly contested reign saw the temporary end of the independent Yemeni state.

== Imamate ==
=== Contest for San'a ===
Al-Muhsin bin Ahmad was a Sayyid from Shaharah, a stronghold north of the capital San'a, and he was therefore also known as ash-Shahari. He was a 15th-generation descendant of the imam al-Mutawakkil al-Mutahhar bin Yahya (d. 1298). Al-Muhsin lived in a time of great political turbulence in Yemen. Ottoman troops intervened in highland Yemen in 1849 but then withdrew, leaving the remains of the Zaidi state to its own devices up to 1872. Several contenders for the Zaidi imamate arose in the wake of this event: al-Mansur Ahmad (1849–1853), al-Hadi Ghalib (1851–1852), al-Mansur Muhammad (1853–1890), and al-Mansur al-Husayn III (1859–1863). The various imams were locally based and only held power for brief terms in San'a itself. Al-Muhsin claimed the imamate in 1855, and again in 1857, under the name al-Mutawakkil al-Muhsin. It was only in 1860, however, that the tribes close to San'a heeded his claim; the tribesmen feared the growing power of the Isma'ili Makramah polity, which was heretic from the Zaidi point of view. In the same year 1860, the inhabitants of San'a, tired of the infighting, issued a proclamation that they would look after their own affairs. A shaykh called Muhsin Mu'id (d. 1881) was made governor of the city. He established contacts with Imam al-Mutawakkil al-Muhsin, who established his residence in the fort of Dhu Marmar and struck coins. In 1867 the imam fell out with Governor Muhsin Mu'id and entered San'a by force, but was unable to remain there. In the next year, an agreement was made whereby al-Mutawakkil al-Muhsin was mentioned in the Friday prayer, leaving administration largely in the hands of the governor. In 1868, the imam also tried to curb the authority of the Makramah (Isma'ili) sect, which had used the times of trouble to take over the al-Haymah district. Although being supported by the Arhab tribe, he was unsuccessful in this enterprise. As a consequence, his prestige dwindled, and San'a once again became the scene of plunderings by tribesmen.

=== Ottoman takeover ===
Lowland Yemen had been under Ottoman rule since 1849. After the Suez Canal was opened in 1869, the Porte feared increased British influence in the southern part of Arabia. With this in mind, the Ottoman authorities resolved to bring entire Yemen under their thumb, in 1872. In the meantime, al-Mutawakkil al-Muhsin had estranged a good part of the population of San'a. Governor Muhsin Mu'id therefore acknowledged a rival of al-Mutawakkil al-Muhsin, called al-Hadi Ghalib, as the right imam. The governor and al-Hadi Ghalib welcomed the Turkish troops who marched into San'a in April 1872. With this intervention the Zaidi state was effectively brought to an end, since a new administration was introduced. Al-Mutawakkil al-Muhsin withdrew to Haddah south of San'a where he rallied support to fight the Turkish occupiers. He was able to rouse the Hashid and Arhab tribes for his cause. His tribal followers were defeated in a series of battles in the same year, however. Al-Mutawakkil al-Muhsin refused to give up resistance and continued to create trouble for the Ottoman governance until his death in 1878. The imam's alliance with the tribal groups remained firm henceforth. He was however unable to seriously threaten the position of the occupiers. After 1888 his sons agreed to receive a pension from the Turkish governor in exchange for loyalty. The torch of resistance was taken over by a pretender-imam of another family, al-Hadi Sharaf ad-Din.

== See also ==
- History of Yemen
- Imams of Yemen

Preceded by al-Hadi Ghalib	Zaydi Imam of Yemen; 1855–1878	Succeeded by al-Hadi Sharaf ad-Din
