= Sofrony =

Sofrony Софроны
- Village
- Location within Perm Krai Location within Russia
- Coordinates: 57°55′N 56°27′E
- Country: Russia
- Region: Perm Krai
- District: Permsky District
- Time zone: UTC+5:00

Sofrony (Russian: Софроны) is a rural locality (a village) in Dvurechenskoye Rural Settlement, Permsky District, Perm Krai, Russia. The population was 44 as of 2010. There are five streets.

== Geography ==
Sofrony is located 19 km southeast of Perm (the district's administrative centre) by road. Novo-Brodovsky is the nearest rural locality.
