= Misail =

Misail is a given name and a Romanian surname. Notable people with the name include:

- Daniella Misail-Nichitin, Moldovan politician
- Misail the Monk (fl. 17th century), Moldavian monk, copyist, and chronicler
- Nicolae Misail, Moldovan politician

A number of East Slavic monastic persons had the monastic name Misail, including:

- Misail Pstruch (fl. 15th century), acting Metropolitan of Kiev, Galicia and all Rus
- ru:Мисаил (Крылов)
- ru:Мисаил (Сопегин)
- ru:Мисаил (епископ Псковский)
- ru:Мисаил (архиепископ Рязанский)
- ru:Мисаил (митрополит Белгородский)
- Misail, monk in the 1874 opera Boris Godunov by Modest Mussorgsky
