= Ibb =

Ibb إِبّ
- City
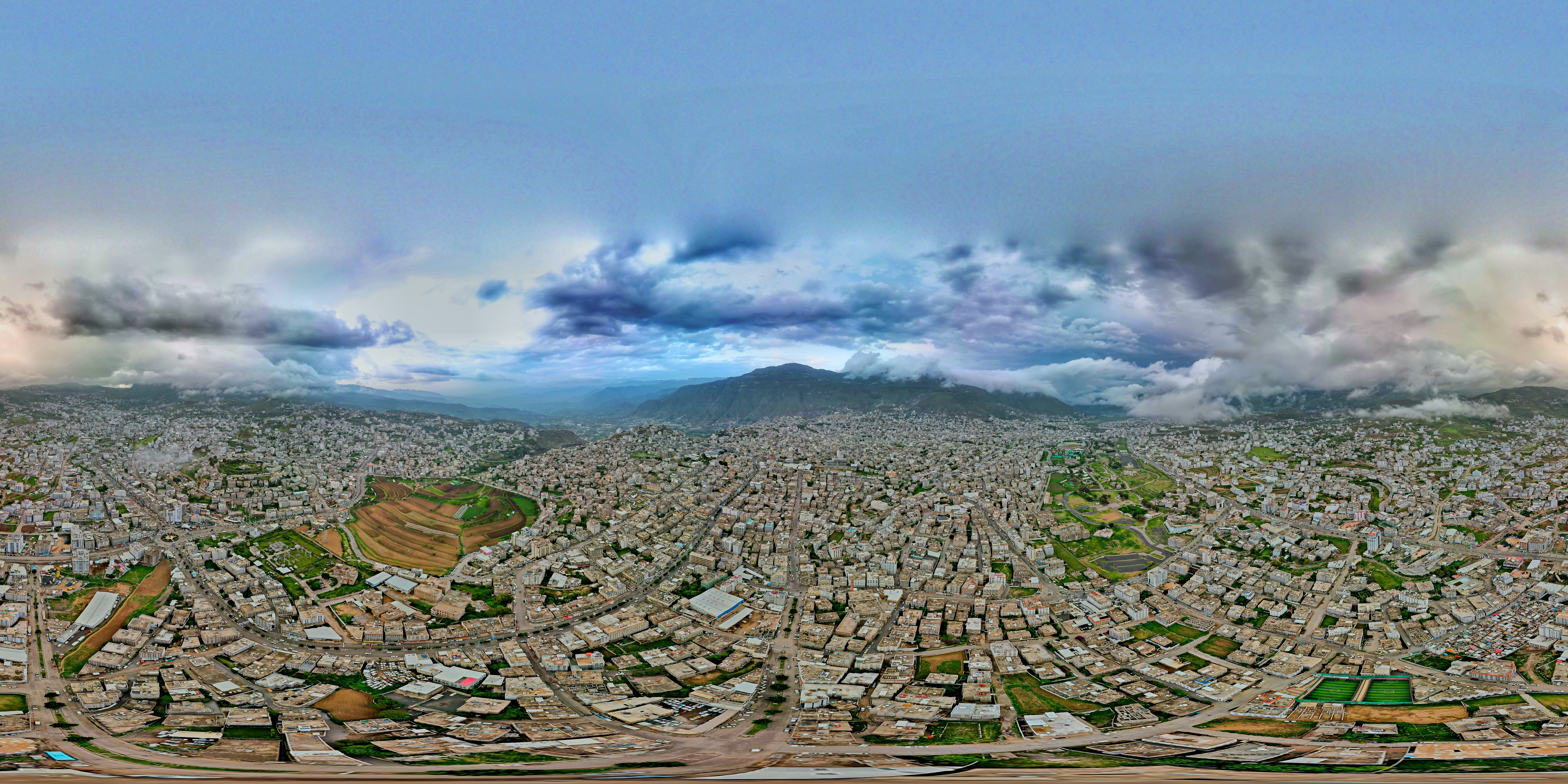

- Location in Yemen
- Coordinates: 13°58′N 44°10′E
- Country: Yemen
- Governorate: Ibb Governorate
- District: Ibb

Population (2005)
  - Estimate (2023): 2,200,379 ▲
- Time zone: UTC+3 (Yemen Standard Time)

Ibb (Arabic: إِبّ, romanized: ʾIbb) is a city in Yemen that is the capital of Ibb Governorate. It is about 117 km (73 mi) northeast of Mokha and 194 km (121 mi) south of Sanaa. A market town and administrative centre developed during the Ottoman Empire, it is one of the most important medium-sized cities in the country. It is situated on a mountain ridge, surrounded by fertile land. As of 2023, it has an estimated population of 771,500 residents.

== History ==
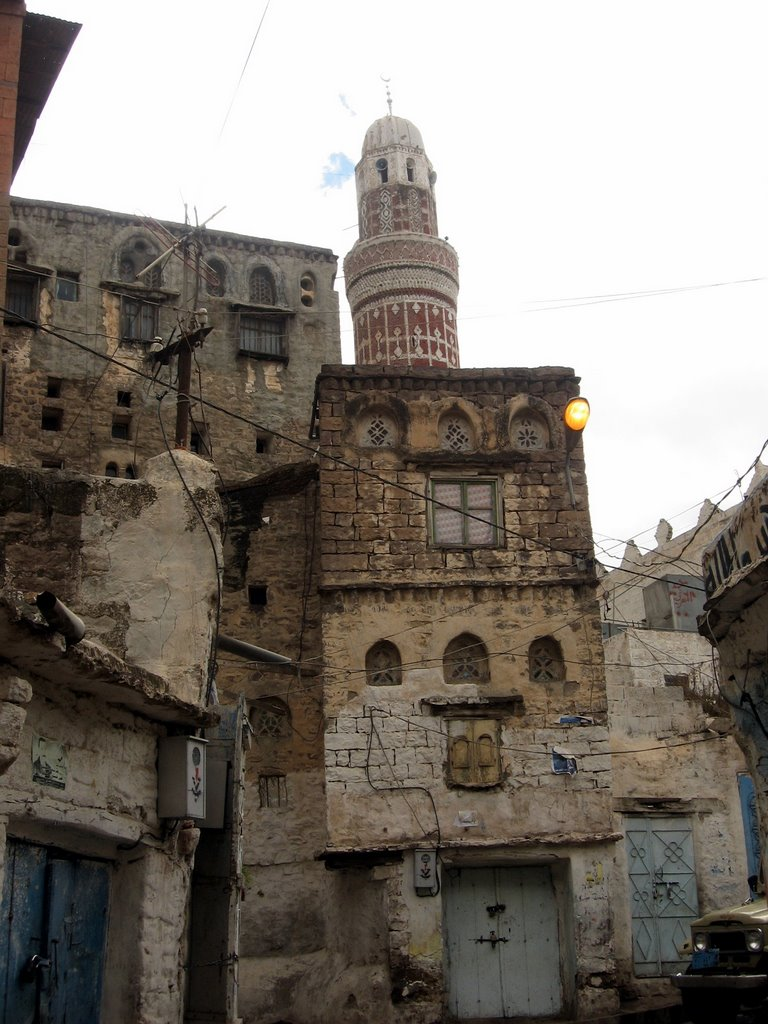
Local architecture

Ibb has been occupied since ancient times, and due to its strategic importance, the Ottomans used it as an administrative center. It thrived as a market town and the Ottomans established the Wednesday market in Ibb. Ibb was governed by a semi-autonomous emir until 1944, when the emirate was abolished. At times in its history many people have migrated to Ibb from areas of Yemen experiencing drought, to find work in farming. In the mid-1950s there was reportedly an outbreak of smallpox in the city.

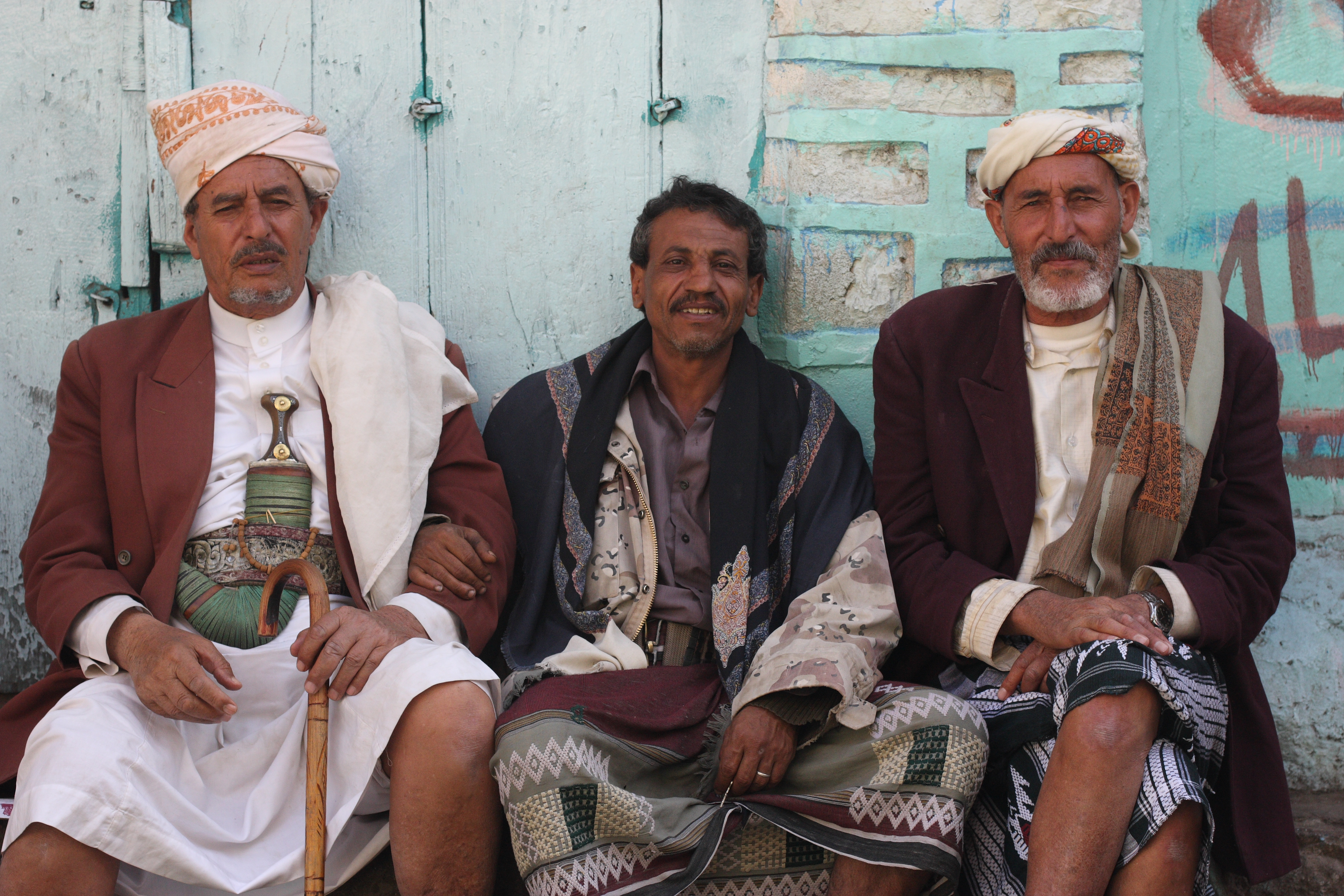
Local men

German explorer Hermann Burchardt photographed the city in 1901; these photos are now held at the Ethnological Museum of Berlin.

== Climate ==
At an altitude of 2,050 metres (6,730 ft), Ibb is on a spur of Mount Shamāḥī. Due to its high altitude, Ibb has a dry-winter humid subtropical climate (Köppen climate classification: Cwa), and is one of the wettest areas of Yemen, typically receiving around 500 mm of rain per annum.

Climate data for Ibb (1,950 m (1.21 miles))
Month	Jan	Feb	Mar	Apr	May	Jun	Jul	Aug	Sep	Oct	Nov	Dec	Year
Mean daily maximum °C (°F)	21.0 (69.8)	21.1 (70.0)	23.6 (74.5)	25.5 (77.9)	27.8 (82.0)	30.1 (86.2)	29.7 (85.5)	27.9 (82.2)	25.7 (78.3)	23.1 (73.6)	21.0 (69.8)	20.8 (69.4)	24.8 (76.6)
Daily mean °C (°F)	14.5 (58.1)	15.2 (59.4)	17.0 (62.6)	19.1 (66.4)	21.7 (71.1)	23.5 (74.3)	24.3 (75.7)	23.2 (73.8)	20.6 (69.1)	17.1 (62.8)	14.9 (58.8)	14.5 (58.1)	18.8 (65.9)
Mean daily minimum °C (°F)	7.9 (46.2)	9.3 (48.7)	10.4 (50.7)	12.7 (54.9)	15.5 (59.9)	16.9 (62.4)	18.8 (65.8)	18.4 (65.1)	15.5 (59.9)	11.1 (52.0)	8.7 (47.7)	8.1 (46.6)	12.8 (55.0)
Average precipitation mm (inches)	5.8 (0.23)	4.6 (0.18)	12.9 (0.51)	16.0 (0.63)	10.2 (0.40)	48.8 (1.92)	150.0 (5.91)	144.6 (5.69)	74.2 (2.92)	32.5 (1.28)	14.1 (0.56)	5.3 (0.21)	519 (20.44)
Source: National Weather Service

== Notable landmarks ==
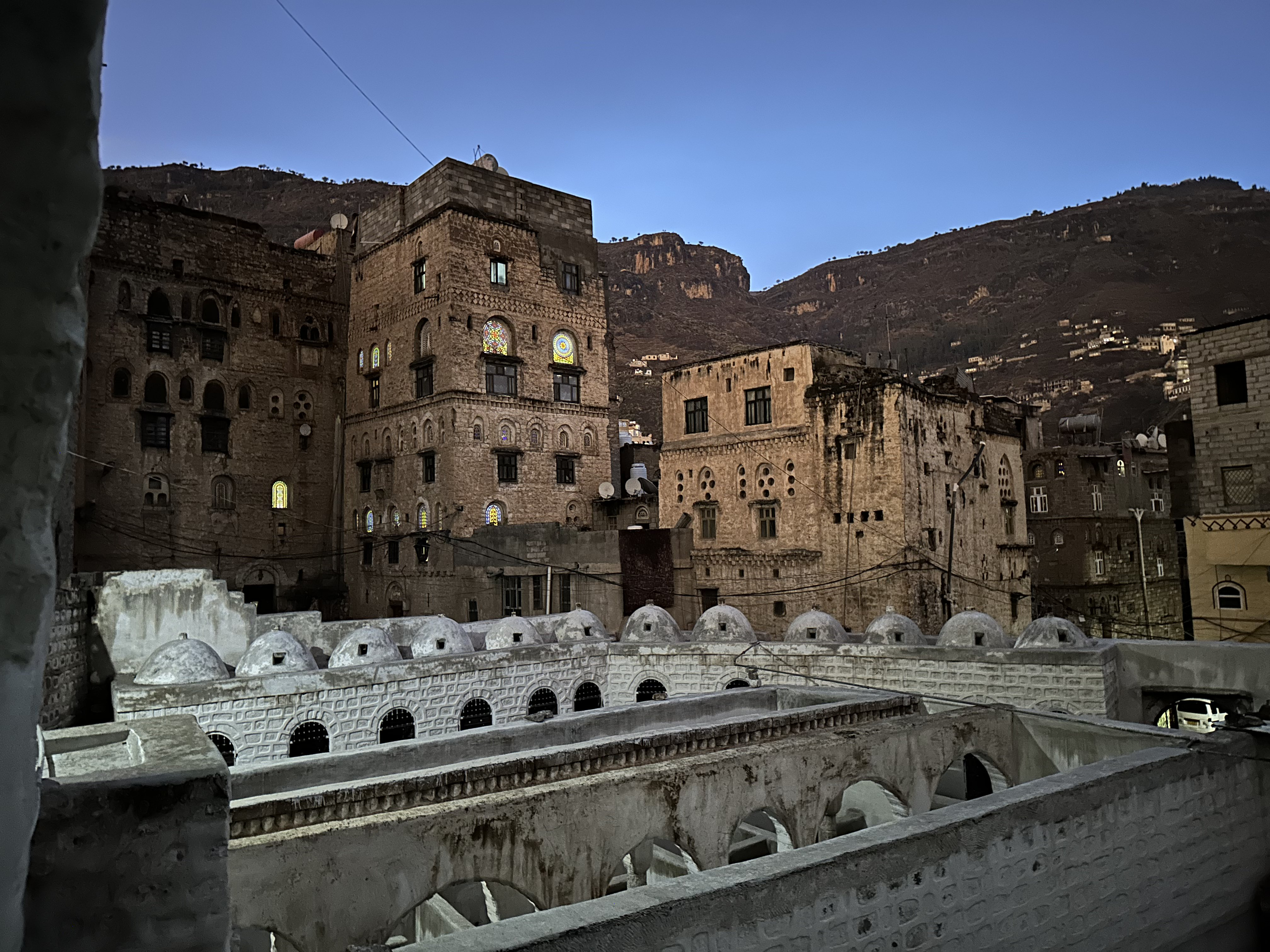
Old Ibb City - Local architecture

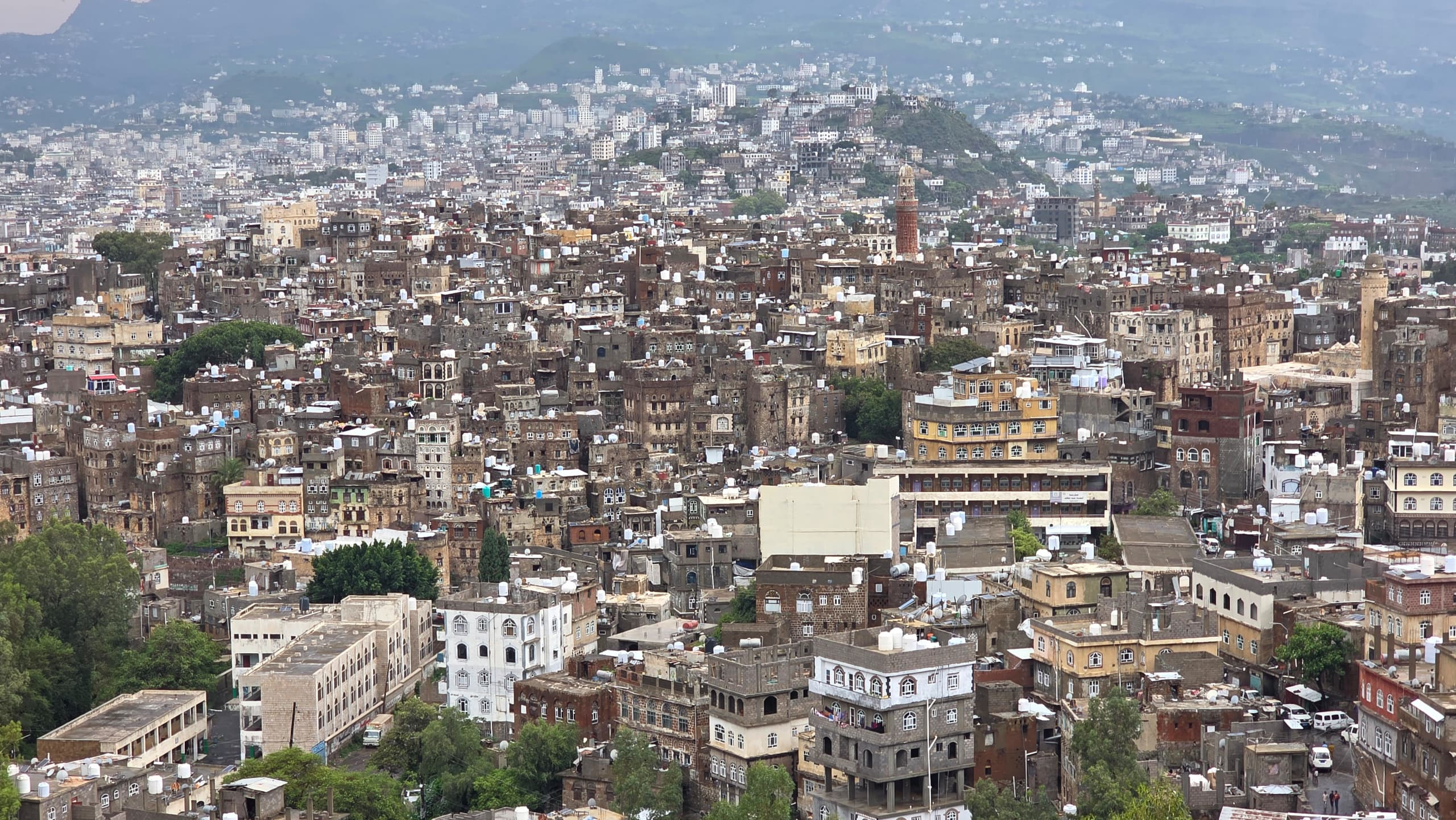
Ibb Governorate - General View

The city includes towering stone houses, with geometrical friezes and circular stained glass windows known as qamariya ("moon-like").

The main mosque was built during the Ottoman period, and there are other mosques and also a fortress in the vicinity, closed to visitors. An ancient overhead aqueduct still remains. Ibb University was established in 1996. The main football team is Al Sha'ab Ibb.

== Notable people ==
- Owais al-Qarani, Muslim saint & Tabi’i
- Abdul Rahman al-Iryani, former President of Yemen
- Abdul Karim al-Iryani, former Prime Minister of Yemen
- Abdul Aziz Al-Maqaleh, poet and writer
- Abdul Majeed al-Zindani, founder and head of Iman University

== See also ==
- Aghrab Beni Awad
- Jibla
- As-Sahul Valley
