= Moisey =

Moisey is a masculine given name. Notable people with the name include:

- Moisey Feigin (1904–2008), Russian artist of Jewish extraction
- Moisey Markov (1908–1994), Soviet physicist-theorist in quantum mechanics, nuclear physics and particle physics
- Moisey Ostrogorsky (1854–1921), Belarusian political scientist, historian, jurist and sociologist
