= An-Nasir Abdallah =

- Born: 1811
- Died: April 1840 (aged 28–29)

An-Nasir Abdallah (1811 – April 1840) was an Imam of Yemen who ruled in 1837–1840. He was a member of the Qasimid family, descendants of Muhammad, which dominated the Zaidi imamate of Yemen from 1597 to 1970.

== Seizure of power ==
Abdallah bin Muhammad bin al-Qasim bin Abbas was a great-grandson of Imam al-Mahdi Abbas (d. 1775). He was originally an imam of the prayer at the Qubbat Mahdi Abbas in San'a. In February 1837, the unqualified incumbent al-Mansur Ali II was deposed by the soldiery of San'a, since their salary was in arrears. Abdallah successfully made his da'wa (call for the imamate) with the help of his partisans among religious students. The deposed imam and his uncle Sayyid Muhammad were kept prisoners by the new ruler, who took the name an-Nasir Abdallah. He took over at a time when the Yemeni lowlands or Tihamah were occupied by Egyptian troops. The viceroy of Egypt, Muhammad Ali Pasha, sent an envoy to an-Nasir Abdallah and summoned him to surrender San'a to the Porte. This was politely refused.

== Religious and legislative policy ==
An-Nasir Abdallah represented the traditional Zaydiyya interests, as opposed to the Sunni-influenced judiciary previously built up by the scholar Muhammad ash-Shawkani. After his accession he strove to deconstruct the legacy of ash-Shawkani. He introduced a strict legislation where the movements of women were restricted, as well as the use of musical instruments. The Taiyabi Ismailis living west of Sana'a were oppressed through his policies. Enraged Taiyabi Ismailis eventually drove the imam's men out of the region of Haraz. In 1840, an-Nasir Abdallah was murdered by his own servants in his country house. According to another version, the assassins were Taiyabi Ismailis from the Hamdan tribe. In his stead, Sayyid Muhammad was released from prison and raised to the imamate, under the name al-Hadi Muhammad.

== See also ==
- Imams of Yemen
- History of Yemen

Preceded by al-Mansur Ali II	Zaydi Imam of Yemen; 1837–1840	Succeeded by al-Hadi Muhammad
