= Yarim =

Yarim يريم
- Town
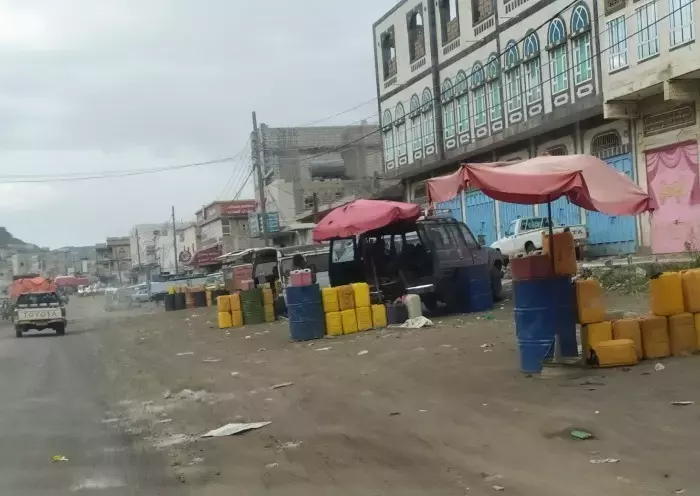
- Street view of Yarim

- Location in Yemen
- Coordinates: 14°17′50″N 44°22′49″E
- Country: Yemen
- Governorate: Ibb
- District: Yarim
- Elevation: 9,800 ft (3,000 m)

Population (2004)
  - Total: 46,964
- Time zone: UTC+3 (Yemen Standard Time)

Yarim (Arabic: يريم) is a town in Ibb Governorate of Yemen. Located in the highlands, Yarim is approximately halfway between Sanaa, Yemen's capital, and Taizz. The ruins of Zafar, an ancient Himyarite site, are 10 kilometers southeast of the town.

== Geography ==
The town of Yarim lies in the heart of the Yemen Highlands, on an upland plateau dominated by the massif of nearby Mount Sumarah, which rises to about 10,000 feet or 3,000 metres above sea level.

=== Climate ===
Yarim has a cool semi-arid climate (Köppen climate classification: BSk).

Climate data for Yarim
Month	Jan	Feb	Mar	Apr	May	Jun	Jul	Aug	Sep	Oct	Nov	Dec	Year
Mean daily maximum °C (°F)	19.6 (67.3)	21.2 (70.2)	23.5 (74.3)	23.4 (74.1)	24.9 (76.8)	26.8 (80.2)	24.5 (76.1)	24.0 (75.2)	24.0 (75.2)	22.4 (72.3)	19.9 (67.8)	19.3 (66.7)	22.8 (73.0)
Daily mean °C (°F)	10.5 (50.9)	11.3 (52.3)	14.3 (57.7)	15.0 (59.0)	16.9 (62.4)	17.8 (64.0)	18.3 (64.9)	17.9 (64.2)	16.7 (62.1)	15.1 (59.2)	12.7 (54.9)	11.5 (52.7)	14.8 (58.7)
Mean daily minimum °C (°F)	1.4 (34.5)	1.4 (34.5)	5.2 (41.4)	6.7 (44.1)	8.9 (48.0)	8.9 (48.0)	12.2 (54.0)	11.8 (53.2)	9.5 (49.1)	7.9 (46.2)	5.5 (41.9)	3.7 (38.7)	6.9 (44.5)
Average precipitation mm (inches)	9 (0.4)	12 (0.5)	23 (0.9)	57 (2.2)	50 (2.0)	18 (0.7)	85 (3.3)	123 (4.8)	39 (1.5)	8 (0.3)	9 (0.4)	4 (0.2)	437 (17.2)
Source: Climate-Data.org

== History ==
In antiquity, the Yarim area was the core of the Himyarite Kingdom, which ruled over much of Southern Arabia from about 115 BC to about AD 575. The Himyarite capital of Zafar was located about 9 miles south of Yarim.

The Swedish explorer and naturalist Peter Forsskål (1732–1763) died in Yarim, where he went to collect botanical and zoological specimens.

Yarim was captured by the Houthis in October 2014 as part of the Houthi insurgency in Yemen. It was subsequently targeted by Operation Decisive Storm.

== See also ==
- Al-Sahul
