= Al-Hadi Ghalib =

Yemeni imam

Al-Hadi Ghalib (1823 – September 30, 1885) was an Imam of the Zaidi state in Yemen who ruled in 1851-1852, and made subsequent periodical claims to the imamate up to the Ottoman intervention in 1872.

== Biography ==
=== Rivalry for the imamate ===
Ghalib bin Muhammad bin Yahya was the son of Imam al-Mutawakkil Muhammad. When his father was imprisoned and murdered in 1849, Ghalib managed to escape. He took refuge with the Dhu Muhammad and Dhu Husayn tribes. In the following years a number of claimants to the position of imam appeared in the Yemeni highlands. In order to settle the uneasy matter a meeting was convened in 1851 at Al Rawdah, north of the capital San'a. The claimants agreed to accept whoever was appointed. Ghalib was one of those present, and was appointed under the name al-Hadi Ghalib. During his short imamate he entertained contacts with the Ottomans, who occupied the Yemeni lowlands (Tihamah). He took a submissive position vis-à-vis the Porte.

=== Chaos and Ottoman takeover ===
His reign was turbulent, since fighting broke out with a rival called Abbas. They each held a part of San'a. In view of the civil strife, many ulema left for other cities. In 1852, finally, al-Hadi Ghalib had to leave San'a and the inhabitants chose a governor (wali), the shaykh Ahmad al-Haymi. According to the British political agent R.L. Playfair, he was once again acknowledged in name around 1858. Governor al-Haymi was counted as his wazir.

Nevertheless, when al-Hadi Ghalib tried to enter San'a in 1857/58, the gates were closed in his face. The imam and his followers besieged San'a, but governor al-Haymi thwarted his ambitions. In the following year, al-Haymi, increasingly impopular among the city dwellers, was forced to flee San'a. The city was subsequently governed by another wali, Muhsin Mu'id, in 1860-1872. By the early 1870s Muhsin Mu'id expelled the current imam al-Mutawakkil al-Muhsin and once again elevated al-Hadi Ghalib to the dignity.

In the meantime, the opening of the Suez Canal in 1869 gave a new impetus to the Turks to take a steadier grip on Yemen, in order to counter British influence among the tribes of the region. The new imam and Muhsin Mu'id found reason to take on a welcoming attitude to the Turks, who marched into San'a in April 1872. With these events the Zaidi state founded in 1597 was terminated, although it arose again several decades later. Turkish administration was introduced and the impoverished imam was forbidden to mix with the chiefs. He subsequently lived on a monthly salary provided by the Ottoman authorities, until his death in Al Rawdah, just to the north of San'a, in 1885.

== See also ==
- History of Yemen
- Imams of Yemen

Preceded by al-Mansur Ali II	Zaydi Imam of Yemen; 1851–1852	Succeeded by al-Mansur Muhammad bin Abdallah
