= Al-Mansur Muhammad bin Abdallah =

Al-Mansur Muhammad bin Abdallah (16 December 1802 – 8 February 1890) was a Zayidi imam of Yemen who claimed the imam title in the period 1853–1890, and ruled briefly in the capital Sanaa in 1853.

Muhammad bin Abdallah al-Wazir was a Sayyid of the Al Wazir lineage from Wadi'l-Sirr. He was a 23rd-generation descendant of the imam ad-Da'i Yusuf (d. 1012). His career coincides with a period of great disorder in the Zaidi state in Yemen which was founded in 1597. The realm of the imam was confined to part of the highlands while the lowlands were ruled by the Ottoman Turks. The current imam al-Hadi Ghalib was deposed in 1852 by the population of Sanaa, who appointed a governor called Ahmad al-Haymi. In the next year 1853, the ulema and notables acknowledged Muhammad as their new imam. As such, he adopted the title al-Mansur Muhammad. He conducted a military campaign to disperse the Arhab tribesmen who had occupied Haima. However, the expedition proved fruitless. Al-Mansur Muhammad himself was expelled from Sanaa after a very short tenure. When he left the city he cursed the inhabitants. And actually a series of calamities befell the urban population, since cattle and grapes were struck by disease, and the plague ravaged the region in the following year. Al-Mansur Muhammad returned to Wadi'l-Sirr where he continued to pose as imam until 1890, handling disputes among the people which were voluntarily brought forward to him. However, he only wielded local importance, and the political initiative went over to other claimants to the Yemeni imamate, in particular al-Mutawakkil al-Muhsin.

== See also ==
- History of Yemen

Preceded by al-Hadi Ghalib	Zaydi Imam of Yemen; 1853 (locally 1853–1890)	Succeeded by al-Mutawakkil al-Muhsin
