= Amram Qorah =

Last chief-rabbi of Yemen's Jewish community

Mori Amram Qorah
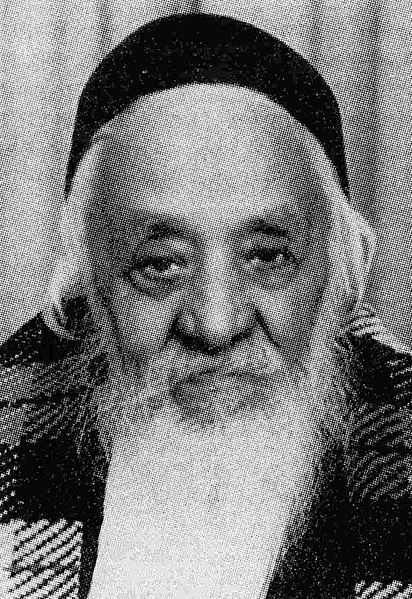
- Title: Chief Rabbi of Yemen

Personal life
- Born: עמרם קורח; 1871 Sanaa
- Died: 1952 (aged 80–81) Jerusalem
- Buried: Jerusalem
- Spouse: Na'amah Shirian
- Children: 8
- Parent: Yiḥya Qorah (father)
- Occupation: Scribe, tax-collector (Yemen)

Religious life
- Religion: Judaism
- Denomination: Baladi-rite
- Profession: Rabbi and Judge
- Position: Av Beit Din (1934–1936)
- Organisation: Rabbinic court at Sanaa
- Residence: Jerusalem

Amram Qorah (Hebrew: עמרם קורח; עמראן קירח; 27 May 1871 – 3 October 1952) was the last Chief Rabbi in Yemen, assuming this role in 1934, after the death of Rabbi Yihya al-Abyadh, Resh Methivta, and which role he held for approximately two years. He is the author of the book, Sa'arat Teiman, published post-mortem by the author's son, a book that documents the history of the Jews of Yemen and their culture for a little over 250 years, from the Mawza exile to the mass-immigration of Yemenite Jews to Israel in the mid-20th century.

== Biography ==
Amram Qorah was born in Sanaa, Yemen, as ʿImrān Qeraḥ, the son of Yihya ben Shalom Qeraḥ. At the age of ten, he was orphaned of his father. As he grew to adulthood, he was active in the study of Jewish ritual and law, which soon qualified him to work as secretary of the rabbinic court under the Av Beit Din, Rabbi Suleiman Qareh. He was also given charge over the community's treasury known as heqdesh (monies raised for the poor of Sanaa), and served as the head of the Al-Kessar Synagogue in Sanaa. In time, after the death of Rabbi Yihya Yitzhak Halevi (d. 1932), he was appointed by the community to serve, alongside Rabbi Hayyim Mishreqi, as an assistant to Rabbi Yihya al-Abyadh, the Head of the Academy and the king's minter of coins, who had succeeded Rabbi Yihya Yitzhak as Chief Rabbi. When Rabbi Yihya al-Abyadh died in late 1934 and the office of Chief Rabbi of Yemen was left vacant, Amram Qorah assumed the role of Chief Rabbi. However, after one year of serving in this capacity, Rabbi Qorah requested of the king Imām Yaḥyā Ḥamīd ad-Dīn (1904—1948) that he be absolved of his duties, because of a raging dispute between members of the Jewish community over the acceptance or rejection of the Zohar, which request was granted him after he had served the community for two years. Still, Qorah agreed to partially act as arbitrator in the resolution of marital matters in his community, as also to continue to serve as one of the city's ritual slaughterers and one that checks defects in such animals. He also served as the liaison in matters relating to the Jewish community in Yemen and the king, and in 1946 he served as the chief intermediary between the Jewish Agency, responsible for Jewish immigration, and the Jewish community of Yemen. This position he held until his immigration to Israel in 1950, when an operation launched by the Jewish Agency known as On Eagle's Wings brought the vast majority of Yemen's remaining Jewish community to Israel. Qorah and his family arrived in the Land of Israel on the eve of Yom Kippur, where he settled in Jerusalem. In Jerusalem, he met with ethnographer and historian, Shelomo Dov Goitein, who interviewed him on several occasions.

In 1931, in a responsum sent to Rabbi Avraham Al-Naddaf, Qorah thought that the book Ḥemdat Yamim (not to be confused with a book having the same title and published by Israel Yaakov Algazi in İzmir) was composed by a relative of the arch-poet Shalom Shabazi, rather than by the poet himself. Scholars, today, however, refute this opinion, asserting that the book was, indeed, composed by Shalom Shabazi. In 1934, Rabbi Qorah wrote a letter of recommendation for the book, Emmunat Hashem, published as a rebuttal to Rabbi Yihya Qafih's Milḥamot HaShem (Wars of the Lord).

In Qorah's latter years in Jerusalem, he tried to no avail to enlist the help of the rabbinate in supplying educators that would teach Yemenite school-children the preservation of their own unique Hebrew pronunciation in Israeli schools.

Like many new immigrants in the late 1940s and early 1950s, wooden crates of handwritten manuscripts and Torah scrolls were sent via ship in the port of Aden to a warehouse ran by the Jewish Agency in Jaffa. Amram Qorah, upon his arrival in the country in 1950, was told that the shipment of books he had sent to the country was burnt in a conflagration. Later, some of these books and religious artifacts were discovered on sale in book shops, and one handwritten manuscript belonging to the family was seen by its owner at the British Museum in London.

One of the grandsons of Rabbi Amram Qorah, Rabbi Shelomo Qorah, served as the Chief Sephardic Rabbi of Bnei Barak, until his death in 2018.

== Works ==
Amram Qorah's opus magnum is Saʿarat Teiman, a book that documents the history of Yemen's Jewry over a 250-year period, in which he drew upon the court records of Sanaa (al-Maswaddeh), and systematically names the chief rabbis who led the community from 1680–1902. Qorah mentions in his book that at the start of the famine in 1905 there were approximately 7,000 Jews living in the city of Sanaa, but one year later, in 1906, approximately 70% of the Jewish population had been decimated.

His other works include:

- ʿAlmuth Shir (עלמות שיר), a commentary on some 200 liturgical poems composed by poets Yosef ben Israel and Shalom Shabazi, first published in the Ḥefetz Ḥayyim Diwan, Jerusalem in 1966.
- Neweh Shalom (נוה שלום), a commentary on difficult words contained in Saadia Gaon's Judeo-Arabic translations and commentaries of the Hebrew Bible, covering the Pentateuch, the Five Scrolls, Isaiah, the Book of Psalms, the Book of Proverbs and Daniel.
