= Avraham Al-Naddaf =

Yemenite rabbi and scholar

- אברהם אלנדאף
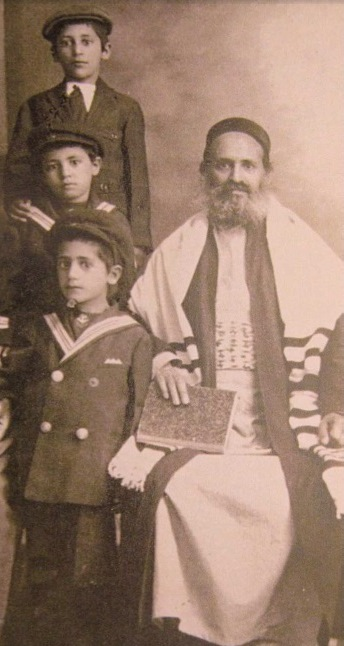
- Rabbi Avraham Al-Naddaf with his three sons, circa 1920
- Born: 1866; Qaryat al-Qabil, Yemen
- Died: 21 February 1940 (aged 73–74); Tel Aviv, Mandatory Palestine
- Resting place: Mount of Olives, Jerusalem
- Occupations: Rabbi, scholar, silversmith
- Notable work: Published the first Yemenite siddur, Tefillat Kol Pe
- Children: Three sons, one daughter
- Parent: Ḥayim b. Salem Al-Naddaf (father)

Avraham Al-Naddaf (Hebrew: אברהם אלנדאף; 1866–1940), the son of Ḥayim b. Salem Al-Naddaf, was a Yemenite rabbi and scholar who immigrated to Ottoman Palestine in 1891, eventually becoming one of the members of the Yemenite rabbinical court (Beit-Din) established in Jerusalem in 1908, and active in public affairs. His maternal grandfather was Rabbi Yiḥya Badiḥi (1803–1887), the renowned sage and author of the Questions & Responsa, Ḥen Ṭov, and a commentary on the laws of ritual slaughter of livestock, Leḥem Todah, who served as the head of Sanaa's largest seat of learning (yeshiva), held in the synagogue, Bayt Saleḥ, before he was forced to flee from Sana'a in 1846 on account of the tyrant, Abū-Zayid b. Ḥasan al-Miṣrī, who persecuted the Jews under the Imam Al-Mutawakkil Muhammad.

== Early life and upbringing ==
Born in Qaryat al-Qabil, Yemen, in 1866, he began to study the Hebrew alphabet at the age of three, followed by Torah and the Aramaic Targum of Onkelos at the age of seven in the Beth midrash of Rabbi Yosef Ha-Cohen in Sana'a, where his parents had relocated. When he had but reached the age of ten, there was added to his curriculum the Judeo-Arabic translation of the Pentateuch composed by Rabbi Saadia Gaon, the Mishnah with the commentary of Rabbi Obadiah da Bertinoro, and the Shulchan Arukh. The following year he was transferred by his father to the Beth midrash of Rabbi Avraham al-Qareh (d. 1890), where he began to learn the proper rendering for readings in the Babylonian Talmud, as this teacher is said to have been the most punctilious and astute of his generation. At the age of fourteen, he continued his studies in the Talmud and in the legal writings of the poskim (exponents of Jewish law), and eventually studied more advanced rabbinic Judaism under the great teacher Rabbi Hayyim b. Yosef Qorah (d. 1914). In 1886, at the age of twenty, Avraham married his first wife who bore him a daughter, but they would both become ill and die during the sea-voyage from Yemen to Egypt in 1891, while en route to Palestine. His one-and-a-half year old daughter was buried at sea, while his wife died in Port Said. Dazed and bereft of his wife and only child, Avraham arrived in Jaffa in the Spring of that year, and from there he traveled with a party, some by cart, others by mules and camels, unto Jerusalem. There he settled in the Old City of Jerusalem and began to work on behalf of the small Jewish community that had immigrated there in 1882, supporting himself as a silversmith and teaching children the rudiments of Jewish education. That same year, he took in marriage a second wife.

== Emissary ==
Rabbi Avraham Al-Naddaf made several trips to Yemen in subsequent years as a rabbinic envoy in order to raise money for the beleaguered Jews of Yemen who had immigrated some years earlier. He became the chief sponsor for building a hostelry and Beit midrash for his community in Jerusalem, as well as initiated the first printing of a Yemenite Siddur, with the Etz Ḥayim commentary of Maharitz, as well as Hebrew Bible codices which were proofread by him and by the Chief Rabbi of Yemen, Rabbi Yihya Yitzhak Halevi, and sent by post to Jerusalem. The small, one-room apartment for a hostelry was eventually built in Jerusalem's Naḥalat Zvi neighborhood.

In 1892, at the resignation of Rabbi Yiḥya Ṣāroum, Rabbi Al-Naddaf was elected by the community to replace him and to head the Yemenite Jewish community. He immediately set-out to forbid Jewish contact with foreign organisations suspected of acting as missionaries. He writes of this period: “At first, we forbade [them] and made them outcasts in the community, anyone who would go again to receive any money, or any clothing, as they did before from the instigators, and even more so those who would go there to listen to their preaching on Sunday in their house of convocation. While even those who would go to work a menial job in their field, such as at the field of Schneller (i.e. the German-run Syrian Orphanage, established in 1861 by the German missionary, Johann Ludwig Schneller, and built far beyond the walls of the Old City, on lands purchased from the villagers of Lifta), be it only for a few hours of the day, so that they might receive their monthly or weekly wages for paying rent, we forbade unto them the clothing that they would give on occasion to the working men. We made it known to them and warned them to desist from receiving [anything from them]. And, thanks be to the blessed God, those who had formerly gone there or who had been errant therein were prevented from doing so. Only a very few refused to change their manner, and would still go there in secret, and occasionally they'd bring [what they needed] for themselves and take it to their houses in a non-conspicuous manner, but they were held in disdain and for a reproach in the eyes of all the congregation, until at length they too desisted [from going there].”

Initially, the Sephardic seminaries (Heb. Kollelim) had received the Yemenite Jews when they first arrived in Jerusalem, but cultural differences forced the Yemenites to separate from their co-religionists and to establish their own seminary. They were also being taxed by the Sephardic community, money that was to go to the public coffers, but they were not being allotted an equal share or subsidy as had been given to the Sephardic Jews. This added to their insult. In 1907, the Ottoman government of Palestine recognized the Yemenites as an independent community (just as Ashkenazim and Sepharadim are independent communities). (Note: A carry-over from the Ottoman Reform Edict of 1856 issued on February 18, 1856, an emblematic text of the Tanzimat, prepared by Mehmed Emin Ali Pasha. It gave new impetus to the reforms. It is presented as an edict of emancipation of non-Muslims, not as individuals but as communities. The confessional community or "Millet" is institutionalized. Each of these non-Muslim communities is provided with a "constitution" giving it a religious leader and an elected community council. It will have free management of its internal affairs. The state prohibits any discrimination on a religious basis2. It recognizes the equality of all inhabitants of the Ottoman Empire, regardless of their religion. These laws are often seen as a consequence of the influence of France and the United Kingdom on the Ottoman Empire after the Crimean War and the signing of the Treaty of Paris of 1856.)

While in Eretz Israel, a question came to the fore about whether or not the Yemenites living in the Land of Israel (who were of the Baladi-rite) should adopt the custom of the other Jewish communities who separate the biblical pericopes Chukat and Balak during the weekly Sabbath readings, although the Yemenites traditionally connect these two pericopes for most years, while separating the pericopes Masei and Matot. Al-Naddaf wrote the Beit Din in Sana'a, seeking their advice, to which inquiry Mori Yihya Yitzhak Halevi replied by writing that the Yemenites are to persist in their own custom, although it differs from the other communities. Mori Yiḥyah Qafiḥ wrote that, from a legal standpoint, it does not matter which custom is actually practised with respect to the pericopes, however, as a first result one should persist in his own custom."

== Legacy ==
In 1903, Rabbi Avraham Al-Naddaf published the community's first Yemenite siddur, Tefillat Kol Pe. In 1907, largely due to the tireless efforts of Rabbi Avraham Al-Naddaf, the Ottoman government recognized the Yemenite Jewish community in Palestine as an independent Jewish community, distinct from the Sephardic Jews and Jews of Ashkenaz. The community leader who answered to the government was Rabbi (mori) Avraham Ṣāroum.

In 1910, the Yemenite Jewish community in Jerusalem and in Silwan purchased on credit a parcel of ground on the Mount of Olives for burying their dead, through the good agencies of Albert Antébi and with the assistance of the philanthropist, Baron Edmond Rothschild. The next year, the community was coerced into buying its adjacent property, by insistence of the Mukhtar (headman) of the village Silwan, and which considerably added to their holdings. During World War I, Rabbi Al-Naddaf issued a proclamation in the name of the Rabbinate of the Yemenite Jews in Jerusalem, addressed to the Yemenite Jews in Palestine about registration.

During the outbreak of the First World War he was drafted in the Ottoman army, but managed to evade actual military service through the efforts of three Jewish elders who appealed to the Ottoman commander, Jamal Pasha, to relieve him. After the British usurped control over Palestine toward the end of 1917, during the start of the Hanukka holiday, all conscripts were then made exempt from military duty.

Later in life, the rabbi with his second wife and their children moved to the Bukharim quarter in Jerusalem, during which time he headed a school (Talmud Torah), named "Torat Or". In 1925, he and his family moved to Tel Aviv where he made a livelihood from ritual slaughter of livestock and as a scrivener of legal documents. Al-Naddaf made commentaries and annotations to Rabbi Yihya Saleh's Questions & Responsa Pe'ulat Sadiq, a work published by Shemuel Badiḥi in two editions. In his old-age, he wrote an autobiography, later published by his son, and re-printed by his grandson. Rabbi Avraham Al-Naddaf died on 21 February 1940 in Tel Aviv's Kerem HaTeimanim, and was buried by his three surviving sons and daughter in the Mount of Olives in Jerusalem.

Around 1938, Meir Shimon Geshuri (one of the founders of Hapoel HaMizrachi) sent a questionnaire to Rabbi Avraham Al-Naddaf containing eighteenth complex questions about the melodies of the Yemenite Jews, which R. Al-Naddaf answered in extensive detail (Al-Naddaf 5778 anno mundi [2018], 275–281).

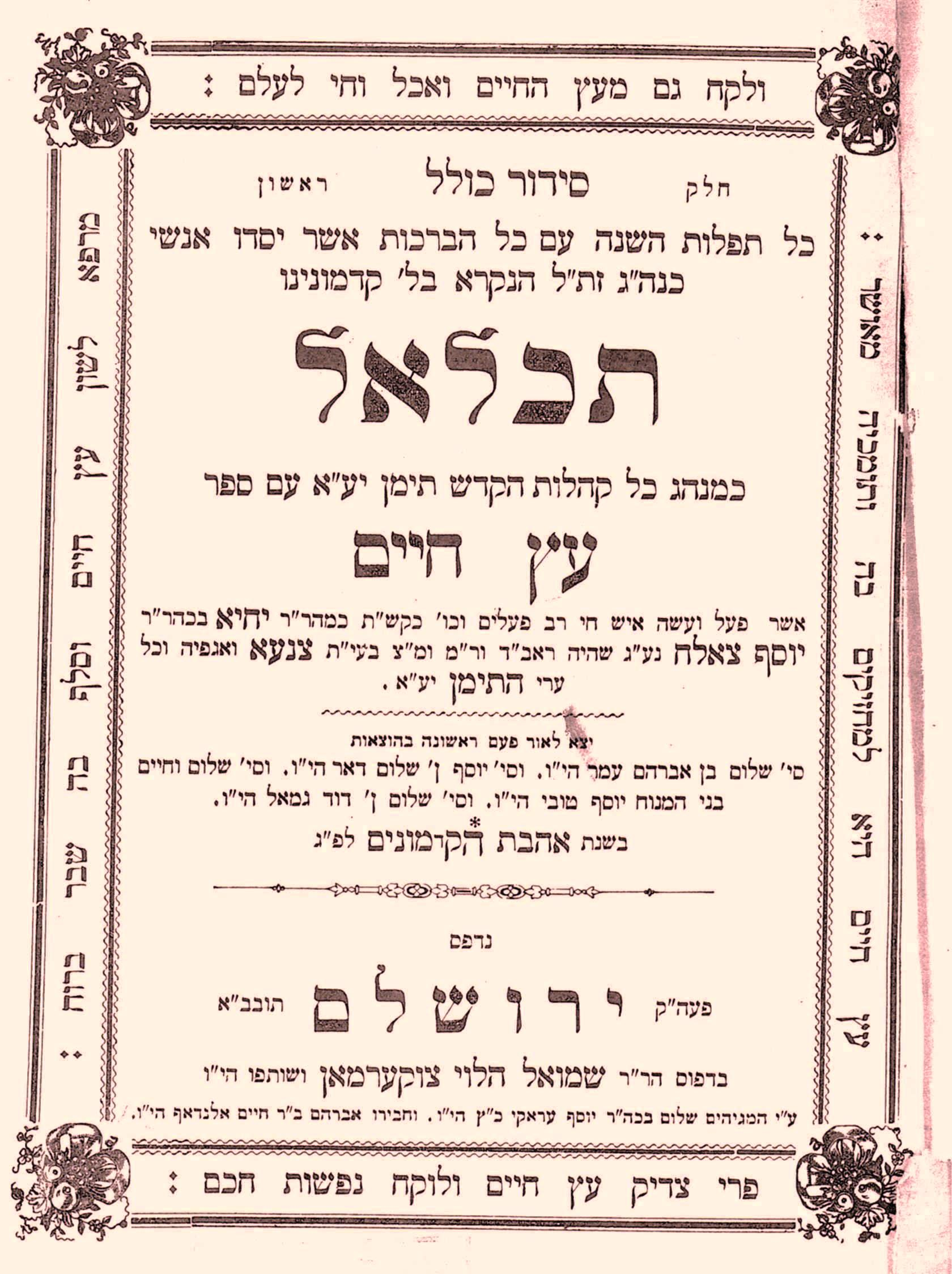
Tiklāl Etz Ḥayim, printed in Jerusalem in 1899

== Published works ==
- Al-Naddaf, Avraham (1981). Saadia Al-Naddaf (ed.). Sefer ʻAnaf Ḥayim (in Hebrew). Vol. 2. Jerusalem: Saadia Al-Naddaf. OCLC 232889851.
- Siddur Tefillat Kol Pe, published in 1903 (5663 anno mundi)
- A book entitled, Ḥoveret, published in Jerusalem in 1928, containing an inventory of the books of Yemenite Jewish provenance, arranged in alphabetical order, as well the first written history of the Yemenite Jewish poet, Rabbi Shalom Shabazi, as also a biography of the kabbalist, Shalom Sharabi (Reprinted in, Zekhor Le'Avraham, by Uzziel Alnaddaf, Jerusalem 1992)
- A booklet entitled, Mevaser Tov, published in 1911.
- A collection of Questions & Responsa entitled, Zikhronei Ish, published post-mortem in 1981, by his son, Saadia, in a book entitled Sefer ʻAnaf Ḥayim.
- A commentary entitled, ʻAnaf Ḥayim, (being a commentary of the commentary Etz Ḥayim), published in the Tiklāl Etz Ḥayim prayer book of 1894, 1899 and 1971 (ed. Shimon Tzalach).
- A siddur entitled Tefillat Kol Pe, published in Jerusalem in 1903.
- The Memoirs of Rabbi Avraham Al-Naddaf, includes a history of the Yemenite Jewish émigrés in Jerusalem at the end of the 19th century and beginning of the 20th century. Published in book, Zekhor Le'Avraham (ed. Uzziel Al-Naddaf), Jerusalem 1992
- Tiklāl Etz Ḥayim, a siddur based on the Baladi-rite, with the commentary ʻAnaf Ḥayim appended at the end of volume 1 (editors: Avraham b. Ḥayim Al-Naddaf and Shalom b. Yosef Iraqi), Jerusalem 1899.
- Taj (Codex of the First Five Books of Moses), including the Targum of Onkelos and the Judeo-Arabic translation of Rabbi Saadia Gaon (Tafsir) and readings from the prophets (Hafṭarah), 2 volumes, Jerusalem 1894–1901 (jointly published with Shalom ben Yosef 'Iraqi Cohen-Tzedek)
- "Shoshannath ha-Melekh" with a Commentary by Rabbi Avraham Al-Naddaf, Manuscript in the Institute for the Preservation of Yemenite Manuscripts (Nosach Teiman, Benei Barak), published in a new edition entitled "Anaf Hayyim."
