= Carl Rathjens =

German orientalist who explored Yemen's Jewish community

- Born: 11 March 1887; Elmshorn, Schleswig-Holstein, German Empire
- Died: 29 June 1966 (aged 79); Hamburg, West Germany

Carl August Rathjens (11 March 1887 – 29 July 1966) was a German geographer whose primary interests were in South Arabian historiography, geology and ethnography. He made several visits to Yemen, in the years 1927, 1931, 1934 and 1938. He is considered the greatest scholar of Yemeni research in the 20th century. He contributed more than any other in conducting scientific and ethnographic research, resulting in a wide range of findings, and he has left over 2500 ethnographical items and some 4000 positive and negative photographs from South Arabia.

== Background ==
Born the son of a teacher, Carl Rathjens began his academic studies in 1906 in the University of Hamburg, and then continued to expand his higher education in the universities of Kiel, Berlin and Munich on the subjects of geography, geology, cartography, meteorology, astronomy, botany, zoology, demography, sociology and economy.

Rathjens travelled to Egypt as a young German student of geography, geology, astronomy, meteorology and biology. At short notice, and without planning, he continued on his journey and traveled to Ethiopia in 1908, accepting a friend's proposal to visit his uncle who officiated there as a priest. During his stay in that country, he met Jews in the Tigré region of Abyssinia and studied their history, religion and culture.

In 1911 he earned his doctorate under Erich von Drygalski with the thesis, Beiträge zur Landeskunde von Abessininen ("Contributions to the Geography of Abyssinia"), in which he proposed to his professor the writing of a follow-up thesis for a habilitation degree, entitled, Die Juden in Abessinien, which would permit him to instruct as a professor. His study on the Jews of Ethiopia was published in 1921. After a short period at the State Zoological Institute in Munich, Rathjens worked from 1911 to 1921 at the Hamburg Colonial Institute and then worked for the World Economic Archives (Welt Wirtschaftsarchive), until his dismissal on political grounds in 1933, for refusal to join the Nazi party. During his years with the World Economic Archives, he would also lecture in the Geographical Department at the University of Hamburg.

== Deferred hope ==
In 1927, Carl Rathjens, Hermann von Wissmann and an orientalist by the name of Erika Apitz travelled to Jeddah, Saudi Arabia, with an aim to make a geological survey of that country and to document the fauna and flora in regions between Jeddah and Mecca. At Jeddah, Daniel van der Meulen, who was a Dutch diplomat and consul, invited them to stay in his house while waiting for the visa from King Ibn Saud. The king's answer reached them after ten days, in which he explicitly forbade them from entering the interior of his country. The three scholars were disappointed and frustrated. They left Jeddah on a ship which brought them to East Africa. There, they felt uncomfortable with the idea about returning at that time to Europe, having not fulfilled their mission. Therefore, they decided to visit South Arabia, which was not originally a part of their itinerary.

== A pioneer in Yemen ==
Rathjens, with his two compatriots, disembarked from a boat which brought them to Yemen the first time in 1927. Upon their arrival in Hodeida, Carl Rathjens wrote to his family in Hamburg that when he entered Yemen he had "left civilization behind him; there are no banks, neither hotels, nor embassies. There are no cars, nor asphalt roads. There isn't any post office in Hodeida; one can use the Telegraph only in Hodeida and Sanaa. There are only two stamps in use in the country and they are not recognized elsewhere outside of Yemen. In the houses there is no tap water; neither is there electricity. The families hardly ever used furniture in their houses. The industrial revolution had not reached this country. Most of the products were hand-made; neither machines, nor technological utensils were used." Compared with Europe, he felt as though he had returned in time to the Middle-Ages. Yemen was, for him, like jumping back five-hundred years in a time machine.

=== Rathjens and the king of Yemen ===
Already on his first visit, he developed a good rapport with the king, the Imām Yaḥyā Ḥamīd ad-Dīn (1864–1948) and his five elder sons, all of whom were serving the country and had ministerial posts, or else managed an important position in the court. Rathjens also nurtured a good relationship with the Prime Minister, Abdallah al Amri. With him he communicated in English. He had a good rapport with the Minister of Foreign Affairs, Muhammad Ragib, with whom he communicated in French. Rathjens and his colleagues were the official guests of the Imam Yahya. They were housed in the state guest house in Bir el Azab, near the Jewish Quarter at Sanaa. In his letters to family members and friends, he had repeatedly described how he enjoyed the hospitality of the king and felt that his life in Sanaa was like a chapter taken from the book, A Thousand and One Nights.

Rathjens and his two colleagues were accredited with making the first archaeological dig in Yemen. The Imam Yahya had sent the three German scholars to Huqqah to dig an ancient grave. Rathjens could not convince the Imam that the three of them were not archaeologists. The three German scholars left for Huqqah near Haggah with a delegation of fifty soldiers and an inspector. With the help of fifty local workers, they unearthed a grave from the second century CE. Rathjens assumed that in Yemen, archaeology was in its nascent stages and that it should be encouraged and expanded. He reasoned, however, that the research should be done in a professional way, employing scientific methods. This gave him the incentive to request from Imam Yahya that he establish a Ministry of Antiquities and to build a museum in which the archaeological findings could be stored and preserved. Rathjens also suggested that the Imam should invite from Germany a team consisting of an archaeologist and philologist for ancient Semitic languages in order to inspect the excavations, as well as to document their findings and do the deciphering of the inscriptions, by using strict scientific methods as those used in Europe.

The Imam was willing to invest in a building for a museum, but not to invite expert scholars from Europe. Rathjens himself taught a locally educated judge how to copy the inscription and to document the items. The Qadi Sadiq was nominated by the Imam as the first director of the archaeological museum. This was the first archaeological museum in the Arabian Peninsula. The museum in British Aden was established a decade later. This was not the only pioneering work accomplished by Rathjens. The museum in Sanaa, however, was not always open. Political and economical hardships caused its closing. During the Second World War the museum was closed, but again opened after the war. Claudi Fayan worked as a medical doctor in Sanaa in the beginning of the 1950s and she took the initiative to reopen the museum, and also worked to open a cultural ethnological museum at Sanaa. The museums were closed again during the civil war which erupted in Yemen in the 1960s. Fiotor Grazjenevitch, who was sent to Yemen from Saint Petersburg to work in a hospital in Taiz, also took an interest in Yemen's archaeology and was part of a Russian mission to unearth a few sites north of Sanaa. He also pressed for the reopening of the archaeological museum in Sanaa.

Rathjens was astonished that no public inspection had been put in place to make the trade in antiquities contraband on the markets of Sanaa, Taiz, Hodeidah, Amram, Dhamar and Saada. He saw that merchants at the markets openly sold to tourists precious antiquities. Furthermore, he was also witness to conversations with foreign traders and tourists who ordered certain items from a certain region, by which means they encouraged the locals to dig-up and rob ancient graves and treasures and to clandestinely bring their findings for sale in the marketplaces. Rathjens was convinced that such trade in antiquities must be stopped and that all findings or discoveries should be documented and kept under national inspection in the country. Furthermore, the pre-Islamic cultural heritage should be part of the curriculum when teaching history in the schools, as well as taught to the locals. Therefore, he recommended to Imam Yahya that he publish a regulation forbidding the exportation of antiquities from the country. The Prime Minister and the Minister of Foreign Affairs supported his view and recommended the same to the Imam for the benefit of the nation. The Imam agreed, and in 1931 he published a decree forbidding the sale and exportation of antiquities without first obtaining a written permit. This action was also seen as a pioneering step for the entire region.

Carl Rathjens also initiated the establishment of a meteorological station. The Imam agreed to his project and nominated him to be in charge of erecting the station. He was given fifty soldiers to assist him. Rathjens started by drawing a plan of the building, but he himself had to look for wood in the remote outlying districts of Sanaa and to bring the material into the capital. He ordered straw from the region of Hodeida for covering the roof. The station was established in only a few months. The Wetter Dienst ("weather service") station in Hamburg donated many measuring instruments and which Rathjens brought to Yemen. In the station, Rathjens and his students collected data on wind, climate, temperatures and precipitation three times a day. The results were sent by telegraph to the weather service station in Hamburg. This was another innovation that Rathjens brought to Yemen and which contributed to the modernization of the country. Although Rathjens was not the first to collect information on weather and climate in Yemen, his work can be recognized as pioneering work in the sense that it was initiated and supported by the state. Such data had already been collected in the past by a previous scholar, Carsten Niebuhr, who in 1763 measured the effects of temperature and precipitation during his first few weeks in Yemen. Eduard Glaser, who had spent more time in Sanaa and had made numerous visits to Yemen at the end of the 19th century, also brought from Germany instruments to measure the temperature, the humidity and the precipitation. Glaser did it from the balcony of a guest house in which he lived. While Niebuhr's and Glaser's work in this field was pioneering in a way, their work was of short duration and lacked the means for making comparisons with the data which they had collected over a longer period of time. Rathjens' plan, however, was that the work at the station would continue for a long period. Therefore, he trained a local group to handle the operations of collecting and transmitting data.

Rathjens was also instrumental in helping to improve Yemen's postal and communication services. Rathjens suggested to Imam Yahya that he register his country in the "International Postal and Telegraph Association". The Imam instructed the director-general of the post office of Sanaa to assist him in these endeavors, while Rathjens went to Berlin to order new stamps that would also be recognized outside of Yemen. After finishing the preliminary preparations for the newer post office, Rathjens submitted an application for Yemen under the Imam to become a member of the International Postal and Telegraph Association. Yemen was put on the global communication map and became a member in 1931, the first country of Arabia to do so.

The Imam was fond of Carl Rathjens and trusted him. He saw in Rathjens a good ambassador for Yemen in Europe. The Imam was interested in importing wheat from Europe, because Yemen had suffered from several years of severe famine. He was also very interested in Rathjens working for him as a consultant for buying weapons in Europe, as well as other industrial commodities to help in the modernization of his country. Rathjens was also very interested in Germany developing friendly relations with Yemen and that the two countries would expand their commercial exchanges. Yemen was annoyed with the British authorities on its southern border and the Imam was fearful that the British would some day attack his country. It was under these conditions that Rathjens encouraged the German Foreign Ministry to sign a treaty of mutual defense with Yemen.

In Yemen, Rathjens studied the political and juridical system of the courtiers, including the demographic structure of the nation, and informed his readers about minority groups living in the country, their social and legal status. He devotes a special review on the Jewish community in Yemen, in a book entitled, Jewish Domestic Architecture in San'a, Yemen, a book detailing their recent history and culture, with documentation of the crafts and the material culture of the Jews in Sanaa.

Carl Rathjens was avant-garde in systematically processing the flora of South Arabia, which he saw there in 1927 and 1928, and added considerably to knowledge in this field.

== Jews of Yemen ==
Rathjens took a personal interest in the Jews of Yemen, photographing them and writing about the Jewish Quarter and its architecture. During Rathjens' visit with the chief rabbi (either in 1927 or 1931), he copied down the names of the towns and villages settled by Jews in Yemen from a list made available to him by the rabbi and taken from the tax rolls, for which the rabbi was accountable to the king. The total number of Jewish communities in Yemen he puts at 371.

== Family ==
Rathjens' son, Carl Rathjens Jr. (1914–1994), was a geomorphologist, specializing in glacial, alpine research and special connoisseur of the East, especially Afghanistan.

== Legacy ==
Rathjens' collection includes over 2,500 Jewish ethnographical items. He offered Mrs. Hadassa Calvari-Rosenblit of the Jewish Agency in Palestine to buy from him the duplicates. She forwarded his offer to the Hebrew University, which bought from him almost 2,000 Items. Rathjens contributed much to preserve the Yemenite culture among the Yemenite Jews in Palestine. Exhibitions were made and lectures were given about the rich Yemenite Jewish culture, with a display of their costumes and jewelry.

In his collection are found some four thousand negative and positive photographs, being the largest visual collection ever made to date by a single researcher in Yemen, and which documents the state and its people during the rule of the Imam Yahya Hamid al-Din and describe a world and culture which has long since vanished and is no more. During his visits to Yemen in 1927, 1931, 1934 and 1938, he either collected, imprinted or bought hundreds of inscriptions dating back to the Himyarite period and the early Islamic Era, purchasing antiquities and collecting ethnographical samples in the various marketplaces throughout Yemen. He loaded these on approximately 100 camels and had them transferred to Hodeida where they were shipped to Hamburg. Rathjens also visited the Aden British Protectorate and purchased antiquities from there worth thousands of pounds.

Most of the collectable items which he brought out of Yemen are today stored in the Museum of Ethnology in Hamburg (Museum für Völkerkunde Hamburg), among which are hundreds of inscriptions from the Himyaritic and early Islamic period, Arabic and Hebrew manuscripts, thousands of items relating to ethnography and the documentation of the material culture in Yemen. In 1939, Salman Schocken (1877–1959) purchased some 800 objects from Rathjens' collection of Yemenite Jewry's ethnographic material, which he then loaned to the Bezalel Museum at the insistence of Erich Brauer and Hadasah Perlman-Ḳalṿari-Rozenbliṭ. With the founding of the Israel Museum in 1965, Carl Rathjens' original collection at the Bezalel Museum, with more than 1000 photographs (of these, some 200 concerning the Jewish community of Yemen), were put under the supervision of Aviva Muller-Lancet for transferral to the Israel Museum, where they are now housed on permanent loan to the Ethnology Department, today part of the Mandel Wing for Jewish Art and Life, under the title "S. Schocken Collection."

== Publications ==
- Die Juden in Abessinien (The Jews in Abyssinia), Hamburg 1921 (OCLC 162451730)
- Sanaa - Zeitschrift der Gesellschaft zu Erdkunde zu Berlin (Sanaa, Journal of the Society for Geography in Berlin), Berlin 1929, pp. 329–352 (jointly written with Hermann v. Wissmann) (OCLC 255484379)
- "Exploration au Yémen", Journal Asiatique, 215 (Paris): pp. 141– 155 (Exploration in Yemen)
- Rathjens.v. Wissmannsche Südarabien-Reise, Hamburg 1931 (jointly written by Rathjens, Hermann von Wissmann, J H Mordtmann and Eugen Mittwoch) (South Arabia travel: Essays from the field of Cultural Studies) (OCLC 483244146)
- Vorislamische Altertümer (Pre-Islamic antiquities), Hamburg 1932 (OCLC 185436380)
- "Landeskundliche Ergebnisse" (Geographic Results), pub. in series: Abhandlungen aus dem Gebiet der Auslandskunde, vol. 40, Hamburg 1934 (jointly written with Hermann v. Wissmann), pp. 133–154 (OCLC 483244146)
- "Sabäische Inschriften" (Sabaean Inscriptions), pub. in series: Abhandlungen aus dem Gebiet der Auslandskunde, vol. 40, Hamburg 1934 (jointly written with Hermann v. Wissmann) (OCLC 483244146)
- Die Pilgerfahrt nach Mekka (The Pilgrimage to Mecca), Hamburg 1948 (OCLC 6640531)
- "Kulturelle Einflüsse in Südwest Arabien von den ältesten Zeiten bis zum Islam unter besonderer Berücksichtigung des Hellenismus". Jahresbericht für kleinasiatische Forschung (Cultural influences in Southwest Arabia from the earliest times until Islam with special consideration given to Hellenism. Annual Report for Asia Minor Research), vol. 1: pp. 1–42.
- Jahrbuch des Museums für Länder-und Völkerkunde, Stuttgart 1951 (OCLC 503913117)
- Sabaeica (2 volumes), Hamburg 1953; 3rd edition published in 1955 (OCLC 559997288); (OCLC 603526740)
- Beiträge zur Klimakunde Südwest-Arabiens: Das Klima von Sana, das Klima von Jemen (Contributions to climatology Southwest Arabia: the climate of Sana, the climate of Yemen), Hamburg 1956 (OCLC 64517353)
- Jewish Domestic Architecture in San'a, Yemen, The Israel Oriental Society, affiliate of the Hebrew University. Jerusalem 1957 (OCLC 48323774)
- "Die alten Welthandelsstraßen und die Offenbarungsreligionen" (The Old World trade routes and the revealed religions): Oriens [Journal of the International Society of Oriental Research], 15, Leiden 1962, pp. 115–129 (OCLC 909794284)
