= Podbořanský Rohozec =

- Municipality
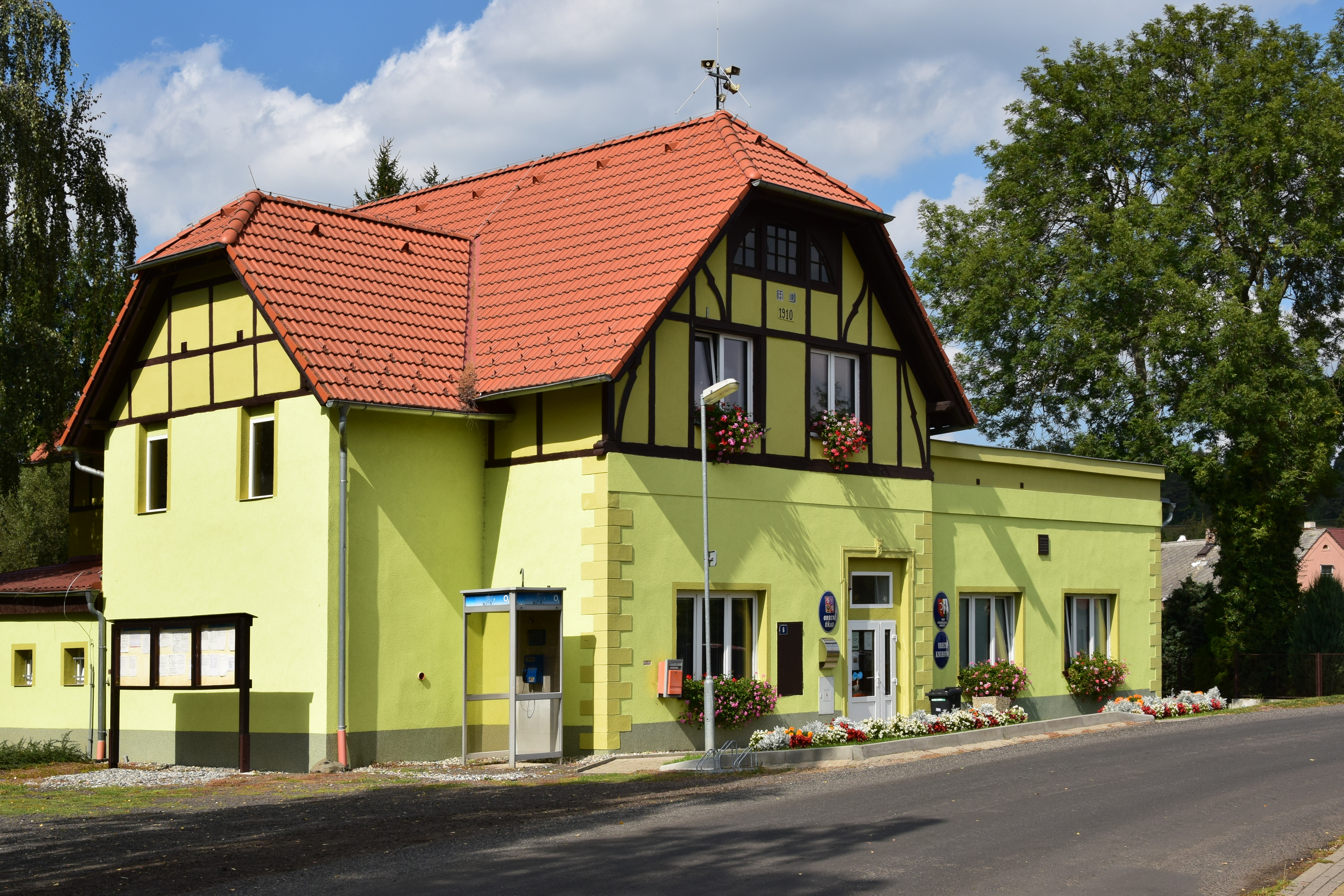
- Municipal office

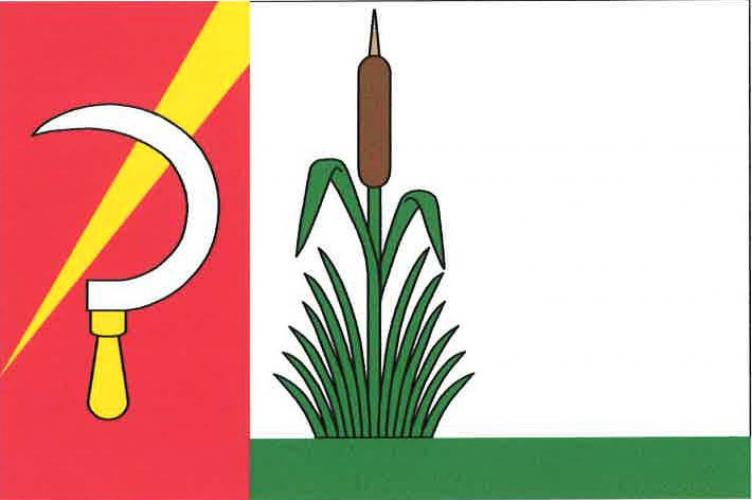
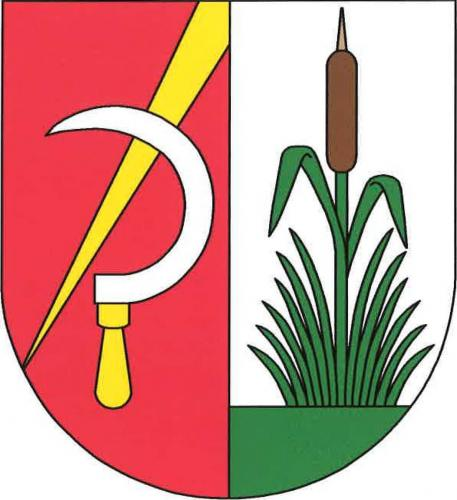
- Flag Coat of arms

- Location in the Czech Republic
- Coordinates: 50°13′0″N 13°15′46″E
- Country: Czech Republic
- Region: Ústí nad Labem
- District: Louny
- First mentioned: 1424

Area
  - Total: 8.96 km^{2} (3.46 sq mi)
- Elevation: 491 m (1,611 ft)

Population (2026-01-01)
  - Total: 159
  - Density: 17.7/km^{2} (46.0/sq mi)
- Time zone: UTC+1 (CET)
  - Summer (DST): UTC+2 (CEST)
- Postal code: 441 01
- Website: www.prohozec.cz

Podbořanský Rohozec (until 1949 Německý Rohozec; German: Deutsch Rust or Teutschenrust) is a municipality and village in Louny District in the Ústí nad Labem Region of the Czech Republic. It has about 200 inhabitants.

Podbořanský Rohozec lies approximately 42 kilometres (26 mi) south-west of Louny, 75 km (47 mi) south-west of Ústí nad Labem, and 84 km (52 mi) west of Prague.

== Administrative division ==
Podbořanský Rohozec consists of two municipal parts (in brackets population according to the 2021 census):

- Podbořanský Rohozec (144)
- Bukovina (10)

== Demographics ==
Historical population
Year	Pop.	±%
1869	712	—
1880	707	−0.7%
1890	671	−5.1%
1900	663	−1.2%
1910	705	+6.3%
1921	712	+1.0%
1930	678	−4.8%
1950	234	−65.5%
1961	216	−7.7%
1970	239	+10.6%
1980	180	−24.7%
1991	132	−26.7%
2001	148	+12.1%
2011	141	−4.7%
2021	154	+9.2%
Source: Censuses

== Notable people ==
- Eduard Glaser (1855–1908), Austrian archaeologist and explorer
