= Hayyim Habshush =

Prominent Yemenite rabbi

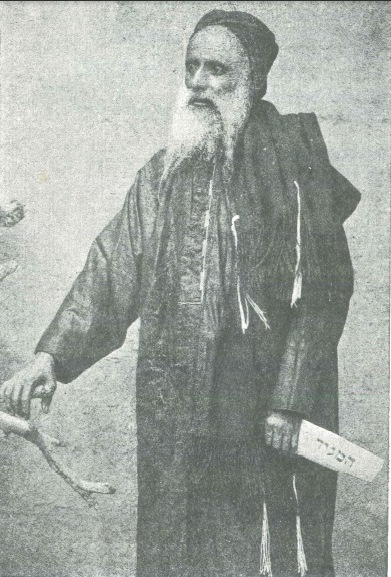
Portrait of Hayyim Hibshush (Yemen, late 19th century)

Rabbi Hayyim Habshush (Hebrew: חיים בן יחיא חבשוש, romanized: Ḥayyim ibn Yaḥya Ḥabshūsh, alternate spelling, Hibshush, ca. 1833–1899) was a coppersmith by trade, and a noted nineteenth-century historiographer of Yemenite Jewry. He also served as a guide for the Jewish-French Orientalist and traveler Joseph Halévy. After his journey with Halévy in 1870, he was employed by Eduard Glaser and other later travellers to copy inscriptions and to collect old books.

In 1893, some twenty three years after Halévy's jaunt across Ottoman Yemen in search of Sabaic inscriptions, Habshush began to write an account of their journey, first in Hebrew, and then, at the request of Eduard Glaser, in his native Judeo-Yemeni Arabic. His initial account was scattered in three countries (Israel, Austria and Yemen), copies of which were later pieced together by Habshush's editor, Shelomo Dov Goitein.

Habshush's most significant contribution to science is that he helped scholars Joseph Halévy and Eduard Glaser decipher the Sabaic inscriptions they had come to copy in Yemen, having made transliterations of the texts in the Hebrew alphabet for easier comprehension.

While Halevy was detained by illness in Sana'a, Habshush went alone to Gheiman, a few miles south-east of Sana'a, where, despite difficulties arising from the suspicion of the people, he copied many inscriptions and excavated part of the pre-Islamic defensive wall. Later, Habshush would write about his friend and companion, Joseph Halévy:

My home I have forsaken, and unto a land rife with [harsh] decrees have I gone with you. My delightful children, my pleasant brothers and my good friends have I left behind, but for the love that I have for attaining your wisdom, I am bound withal; and to be somewhat of a scout, while assuming upon myself a little of the wisdom of my lord, I have put my life into mine own hands, by traversing a land that is not cultivated, a land of wild men, just as your eyes have seen, all the hardships that we found along the way, until my return unto my own house.

== Family background ==
As a prominent member of the Jewish community in Yemen, Rabbi Habshush served as one of the principal leaders of the Dor Deah movement alongside Rabbi Yiḥyah Qafiḥ, and Sa'id 'Arusi.

The Hibshush family is one of earliest known Jewish families to have settled in Yemen, as he mentions the family living in Yemen before the advent of Islam, and who, along with four other Jewish families (al-Bishārī, al-Futayḥī, al-‘Uzayrī and al-Marḥabī) served the illustrious Sasson Halevi who had recently moved to Yemen from Iraq (Babylonia). Sasson Halevi is the progenitor of the renowned Alsheikh Halevi families, as well as the Yitzḥaq Halevi families, the former of whom rose to prominence after the Mawza Exile, and the latter of whom produced one of the last judges of the rabbinic court at Sana'a, Rabbi Yiḥya Yitzḥaq Halevi. The Hibshush family was originally called by the surname al-Futayḥī. In Yemen, however, Jews would address the family by the name of "Hibshush," while Muslims would say "Habshush."

== Legacy ==
One of the important revelations arising from Hayyim Habshush's expedition with Joseph Halevy to the city of Saada and in the regions thereabout is that, in his book Masa'ot Hibshush (Travels of Hibshush), he mentions the city of Tilmaṣ as being the old city of Saada. He brings down an old Yemeni rhymed proverb: אדא אנת מן מלץ פאנא מן תלמץ "If you are evasive (Ar. malaṣ), then I am from Tilmaṣ". The importance of this revelation lies in the fact that scholars were heretofore uncertain about the place called "Tilmas" in Benjamin of Tudela's Itinerary, mentioned alongside Tayma, and where two Jewish brothers were allegedly the princes and governors over those places in the 12th century. One is now in Saudi Arabia while the other in Yemen.

== Man of justice ==
One of the special traits with which Rabbi Hayyim Hibshush was gifted was his deep sense of justice and his natural abhorrence of evil. Ya'akov ben Hayyim Shar‘abi was the Jewish treasurer of the heqdesh, money raised for the poor of Sana'a. He was found murdered in his house in 1895, and money was stolen which had been placed in his charge. Hayyim Hibshush conducted an investigation and revealed the identity of the murderer, who was then imprisoned.

A Jewish newcomer to Sana'a named Yosef Abdallah ("the servant of God") declared himself to be the herald of the coming Messiah and made his living by selling amulets and poultices. He lured simple and unsuspecting persons by his words of deliverance and by his prophylactic talismans, and the leaders of the community suspected him of being an impostor and one who harbored impure motives, and he was further suspected of revelry and of lechery with women; the leaders also feared that he would bring harm to the community by a perceived threat to the government. Rabbi Hibshush closely watched him and had his house placed on surveillance. The man's impure motives eventually became clear to Rabbi Hibshush, and he persuaded the magistrates and the governor (wāli) of the city to ask the man to leave.

== Published works ==
- Verskin, Alan (2018). A Vision of Yemen: The Travels of a European Orientalist and His Native Guide – A Translation of Hayyim Habshush's Travelogue. Stanford, California: Stanford University Press. ISBN 978-1-5036-07743.
- Masot Habshush (Hebrew: מסעות חבשוש, lit. 'The Journeys of Habshush') The travels of Hayyim ben Yahya alongside Joseph Halévy in Yemen and the life of Arabs and Jews living there (published in 1941, and republished in 1983; edited by S.D. Goitein).
- Korot Yisrael b'Teiman (Hebrew: קורות ישראל בתימן, lit. 'The Annals of the Israelites in Yemen') A history of the Jews in Yemen during the 17th and 18th Century CE, believed to be a recension of an earlier work composed by chronicler, Yahya b. Judah Sa'di, and to which Hibshush added his own chronologies. The work is most noted for its detailed description of the Mawza Exile (Galut Mawza) in 1679-1680.

== See also ==
- Yemenite Jews
- Dor Daim
- Yemenite Jews#Dor Daim and Iqshim dispute
- Yiḥyah Qafiḥ
