= Yiḥyah Qafiḥ =

Yemenite rabbi

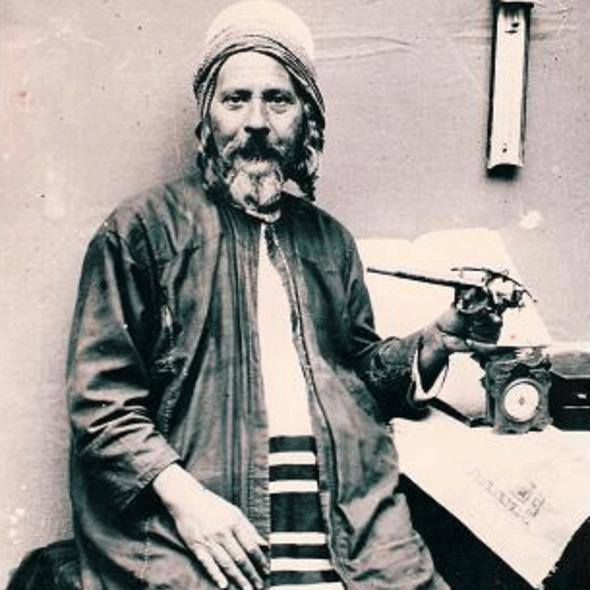
Rabbi Yihya Qafih

Yiḥyah Qafiḥ (Hebrew: רבי יחיא בן שלמה קאפח; Arabic: يحيى القافح also known as Yiḥyah ibn Shalomo el Qafiḥ and as Yahya Kapach (his Hebrew name)) (1850–1931), known also as "Ha-Yashish" (English: "the Elder"), served as the Chief Rabbi of Sana'a, Yemen in the late nineteenth and early twentieth centuries. He was one of the foremost rabbinical scholars in Sana'a during that period, and an advocate of reforms in Jewish education. He was also learned in astronomy, and rabbinic astrology and Jewish classical literature.

== Biography ==
Yihyah Qafih was raised by his grandfather, after being orphaned of his father and mother at around the age of six. As a child, he studied Torah under the great Rabbi, R. Ḥayim Qoraḥ, his deceased mother's nephew. Later, he studied under Rabbi Yiḥya b. Yosef al-Qāreh, from whom he received his ritual-slaughtering license in 1870. Although Rabbi Yihya Qafih served for only one year (1899–1900) as the Chief Rabbi of Yemen (Turk. Ḥakham Bāshī), he was a permanent member of the rabbinic court in Sana'a until his death, serving with the Chief Jurist and Rabbi, Yihya Yitzhak Halevi (d. 1932), whose signatures appear together in many of the court documents and responsa issued in the first quarter of the 20th century. In the late 19th century, he was the host to the Austrian Arabist and archeologist, Eduard Glaser, who conducted research in Yemen, and at the turn of the 20th century, he carried on a written correspondence with one of the chief rabbis of Ottoman Palestine in Jaffa, Rabbi Abraham Isaac Kohen Kook, who later took on this role in an official capacity in 1921, in which he and his fellow jurists answered twenty-six questions posed to the Court at Sana'a.

Rabbi Qafiḥ had served as one of the chief instructors in the city's largest seat of learning (yeshiva), held then in the synagogue known as Bayt Saleḥ, until a famine in 1905, resulting from a war with the Ottoman Turks, forced the closure of the yeshiva. In the spring of 1906, Rabbi Yihya Qafiḥ was confirmed by the ruling monarch as one of four representatives of the Jewish community in Sana'a, along with Harun al-Cohen, Yiḥya Yitzḥak Halevi and Yiḥya al-Abyadh. The document outlined the obligations of the Jewish community toward the Muslim State and the Poll Tax (Ar. al-jizya) assessed against every male 13 years of age and older. In 1909, he became the headmaster of a Jewish school built by the Ottoman Turks in Sana'a, known as al-Makktab He initiated many reforms in Jewish education, such as teaching arithmetic and geography alongside the Torah, and employing Turkish teachers in the school for teaching the Turkish language to Jewish youth. One of the failures of the school, according to Yemen's last Chief Rabbi, Rabbi Amram Qorah, was that by teaching the Turkish language, their study of Hebrew suffered, seeing that the Jewish youth had less time to fully acclimate themselves to the rules of Hebrew grammar and to the finesse of the language. During this time, the controversy over the study of the Zohar worsened. After being incarcerated twice by Muslim authorities in 1914, being released only in Adar of 1915, Rabbi Qafiḥ regretted his earlier reluctance to speak out against aspects of the community with which he disagreed. He began to be more vocally opposed to practices he perceived as folk superstition. It was around this time that he augmented the Dor Deʻah movement in Orthodox Judaism, to counter the influence of Lurianic Kabbalah, seeking to promote a more rational approaches to Judaism such those of Maimonides and Sa'adiah Gaon, and to encourage the practice of Halakha as formulated by Rambam in the Mishneh Torah. However, the innovations and textual readings enacted by Rabbi Qafih in his Beit midrash were the main cause for the schism in Sanaa's Jewish community, a schism that was fanned perpetually by "highly spirited youth." Since the Darda'im were interspersed in all the synagogues in Sana'a, the proprietors of those synagogues feared that this would lead to changes in their own rituals and customs, which they strongly opposed.

Rabbi Yiḥyah Qafiḥ was known to have "spent huge sums in order to recover manuscripts, even fragments of manuscripts of his [Maimonides'] works."

== Controversy ==
=== Background ===
Ethnographer and historian, Shelomo Dov Goitein, gave a poignant description of the new movement in Yemen of which Hayyim Habshush was a member, and which movement in later years, after his death, had been further expanded under the charismatic leadership of Rabbi Yihya Qafih: “...He (i.e. Hayyim Habshush) and his friends, partly under European influence, but driven mainly by developments among the Yemenite Jews themselves, formed a group who ardently opposed all those forces of mysticism, superstition and fatalism which were then so prevalent in the country and strove for exact knowledge and independent thought, and the application of both to life.” This same movement would later be coined the name Daradʻah by Rabbi Yihya Yitzhak Halevi, a word that is an Arabic broken plural made-up of the Hebrew words Dör Deʻoh, which means "Generation of Reason."

Rabbi Qafiḥ identified a strong superstitious influence in Yemen which he saw as contrary to Orthodox Judaism. For example, his grandson Rabbi Yosef Qafih related one of many Yemenite customs for "חינוך הבית" whereby they would bake plain bread without salt and prepare "the table of appeasement." Inviting more than 10 children aged seven or eight who waited outside, they set the table, scattering thin-ash upon it; crumbled the plain bread into bits, placing them upon the table holding the ashes; and exited the kitchen stating, to the demons (Hebrew: שדים), "this is your portion." Shortly thereafter they would abruptly open its doors, whereupon the children bursted in, grabbing the saltless pieces and eating them. Rabbi Yiḥya Qafiḥ sharply opposed these minhagim being of the opinion that, in addition to the stupidity of the matter, they are Biblically forbidden because of darkhei haEmori.

=== Correspondence with Rav Kook ===
In a letter addressed to Rabbi Avraham Isaac Kook, the chief Rabbi of Mandate Palestine, Rabbi Yihya Qafih argued that the mystical ideas presented in Kabbalistic literature contradict his understanding of Judaism as a rational philosophical and legalistic system. Rav Kook refuted these concerns in his reply, defending the Zohar and requesting that Qafih revert from his position.

=== Milḥamot Hashem ===
The work for which Rabbi Qafiḥ is most well known is Milḥamot HaShem (Wars of the Lord, which takes the same name as earlier books) and which he began writing in 1914 (published in Jerusalem, 5691 [1930/1931]). In it he argues that the Zohar is not authentic and that attributing its authorship to the Tannaitic sage Rabbi Shimon bar Yochai is to besmirch him. Milḥamot HaShem argues that Kabbalstic concepts such as the emanation of sefirot and partzufim muddied the pure monotheism of Judaism. This stance met with much opposition, and led the Rabbi to become engaged in correspondence with Rabbi Abraham Isaac Kook (the first Ashkenazi Chief Rabbi of British Mandate Palestine, who was known for his engagement with mysticism). Rabbi Qafiḥ sent a copy of Milḥamot HaShem to Jerusalem in hopes of expediting its printing there, so that in the event additional objections would be raised he would have the opportunity to respond while still alive, but delays and a prolonged printing process resulted in his death soon after its printing and editing. Some Rabbis of the Haredi camp, such as Rabbi Chaim Kanievsky, have echoed condemnation of Rabbi Qafiḥ's work as heretical. Others, such as Rabbi Ovadia Yosef, have expressed disagreement with Rabbi Yihyah Qafih's work but maintained that such views are not heretical. Yet others, such as Rabbis Eliyahu Dessler and Gedaliah Nadel, expressed agreement and maintained that it is acceptable to believe that the Zohar was not written by Rabbi Shimon bar Yochai and that it had a late authorship. Already over 200 years ago the Noda Bihudah, in his sefer Derushei HaTzlach, argued that the Zohar is to be considered unreliable as it came into our hands many hundreds of years after Rashbi's death and it lacks an unbroken mesorah as to its authenticity, among other reasons. Similarly, and taking after R. Yaakov Emden, Hatam Sofer was of the opinion that the majority of the Zohar was written in the medieval period, with a leading student of his even reporting Sofer to have said in the presence of many disciples "that if one separates what R. Simeon ben Yohai wrote from the later additions, the Zohar would only contain a few pages."

A related work, printed at the same time as Milḥamot HaShem, is Da'at Elohim (published in Jerusalem, 5691 [1930/1931]), written in response to an essay by Hillel Zeitlin that appeared in the Hebrew quarterly HaTekufah, Book 5 (1919).

==== Errors in Milḥamot Hashem ====
In the introduction to his English translation of R. Yosef Ergas's book Shomer Emunim, Rabbi Avinoam Fraenkel outlines the heavy reliance of R. Qafiḥ's anti-Kabbalistic argument on citations of the book Oz Le'Elohim by Nechemia Chiya Chayun. Qafiḥ incorrectly presented Chayun's book as representative of the beliefs of mainstream Jewish Kabbalah, despite the fact the Chayun was a Shabbatean and that the book was a commentary on a book written by the false messiah Shabbatai Tzvi. R. Ergas polemicized against Chayun in his books Tochachat Megula and HaTzad Nachash, quoting directly and exposing Chayun's work as divorced from Judaism and Kabbalah. R. Qafiḥ's portrayal of Oz Le'Elohim as if it were an accepted, legitimate source on the subject was either a major scholarly error, or an intentional misrepresentation in support of his attack against Kabbalah. Rav Kook also called this very mistake out in a letter written as an approbation to the book Emunat Hashem, which was a systematic refutation of Milḥamot Hashem.

== Students ==
Of Rabbi Yiḥyah Qafiḥ's more famous disciples were Mori Yiḥya al-Abyadh who served as the Chief-Rabbi of Yemen (1932–1934) after the death of Rabbi Yihya Yizhak Halevi, and whose most memorable enactment was to erect two new gates at the far north-western extremity of the plain where the Jewish Quarter was built, in order to fix thereby the laws governing the carrying of objects from one domain to another (Eruv), and to prevent Muslims from entering the Jewish Quarter at night to purchase liquor; Rabbi Yosef b. Aharon Amar Halevi (1911–1988), who rose to acclaim in the land of Israel for having punctuated the entire Babylonian Talmud in the traditional manner in which words were pronounced in Sana'a, a work that took him twenty years to complete; and Yisrael Yeshayahu, a member of the Israeli Parliament in 1951, and co-editor of the historical book, Shevuth Teiman, in 1945.

== Legacy ==
In 1927, Rabbi Yiḥyah Qafiḥ retrieved the world's oldest complete Mishnah commentary from the genizah of Old Sana'a, that of Rabbi Nathan ben Abraham, President of the Academy in the Land of Israel (11th-century CE). The work, thanks largely to the efforts of Rabbi Yiḥyah Qafiḥ's grandson, Rabbi Yosef Qafiḥ, saw publication in 1955. Rabbi Yosef Qafih, who succeeded his grandfather in Yemen, and later in Israel, became one of the foremost leaders of the Yemenite community. He published corrected and translated versions of texts (see his published works), including all of Maimonides’ Jewish works based on centuries-old manuscripts rescued and preserved by his grandfather.

== See also ==
- Mishneh Torah
- Yosef Qafiḥ
- Dor Daim and Iqshim
- Dor Daim
- Hayyim Habshush
- Yihya Yitzhak Halevi
- Baladi-rite Prayer
