= Dor Daim =

Yemenite Jewish scholarly and belief system

The Dardaim, or Dor Daim (Hebrew: דרדעים), were adherents of the Dor Deah (דור דעה, 'generation of knowledge'). Dor Deah is an allusion to the Israelites during the Exodus as recounted by the Hebrew Bible.

The movement was formally formed in Yemen by Yiḥyah Qafiḥ in 1912 and had its own network of synagogues and schools. The movement may have existed long before its 1912 formalization. According to ethnographer and historian Shelomo Dov Goitein, author and historiographer Hayyim Habshush had been a member of the movement before it had been given the name Dor Deah, writing, "He [i.e., Hayyim Habshush] and his friends, partly under European influence, but driven mainly by developments among the Yemenite Jews themselves, formed a group who ardently opposed all those forces of mysticism, superstition and fatalism which were then so prevalent in the country and strove for exact knowledge and independent thought, and the application of both to life." Years later, Qafih became the headmaster of a new Jewish school in Sanaa established by the Ottoman Turks, introducing a curriculum that included arithmetic and basics of Arabic and Ottoman Turkish. Yihya Yitzhak Halevi named Qafiḥ's movement Darad'ah, derived from an Arabic broken plural and based on the Hebrew Dor De'ah.

Its objectives were:

1. To combat the influence of the Zohar and subsequent developments in modern Kabbalah, which were then pervasive in Yemenite Jewish life and which the Dor Daim believed to be irrational and idolatrous.
2. To restore what they believed to be a rational approach to Judaism rooted in authentic textual sources, including the Talmud, Saadia Gaon, and especially Maimonides (also known as Rambam, רמב״ם).
3. To safeguard Baladi-rite prayer, which they believed to be based on their approach.

In the 21st century, there is no official Dor Dai movement. Still, the term is applied to individuals and synagogues within the Yemenite Jewish community, mostly in Israel, who share the original movement's perspectives. Some groups within and outside the Yemenite community hold a somewhat similar stance, describing themselves as talmide ha-Rambam (תלמידי רמב״ם, 'students of the Rambam') rather than Dor Daim.

== History ==
=== Background: Baladi and Shami rituals ===
Since the early Middle Ages, the Yemenite Jewish community followed the teachings of Maimonides on almost all legal issues, and their prayer book was substantially identical to the text set out in his "Sefer Ahavah". This is attested by the writings of several well known Rabbis such as Nahmanides, Obadiah of Bertinoro, and Yiḥyah Salaḥ. The Yemenite tradition is therefore separate from both the Sephardi and the Ashkenazi streams in Judaism.

In the 16th and 17th centuries, the teachings of Kabbalah, especially in the form advocated by Isaac Luria and his school, became increasingly popular in Yemen as in other countries. This did not always mean a change in the liturgy; Luria himself held that it was essential to keep to the form of prayers inherited from one's ancestors to reach the gate in Heaven appropriate to one's tribe. However, many individuals and communities around the world (principally Mizrahi Jews but also Ḥasidim) discarded their ancestral rites in favour of the modified Sephardic rite used by Luria and his immediate circle, on the reasoning that this form of prayer reached a "thirteenth gate" for those who did not know their tribe.

This division would be reflected among the Yemenite Jews. The Shami sub-group adopted a Sephardic-influenced rite, in no small part due to its essentially being forced upon them. Others retained the Yemenite ancestral liturgy, whether or not they accepted the Zoharic/Lurianic Kabbalah theologically. In the 18th century, to ensure the continued use of the Yemenites' original text, Yiḥyah Salaḥ promoted compromise and introduced a new edition of the Baladi-rite prayer books he created. It substantially followed the traditional Yemenite itual but made some concessions to the Kabbalists, for example, by incorporating the hymn Lekhah Dodi. This new standard became known as Baladi "of the country" (referring to Yemen), in contrast to the adopted Lurianic Sephardic ritual, which was known as Shami"northern," (meaning Palestinian or Damascene). The distinction also affected questions of Jewish law; the Baladi community continued to follow Maimonides almost exclusively, while the Shami community also accepted the Shulchan Aruch.

In the 18th century, Yemen produced an influential Kabbalist in Shalom Sharabi, who headed the Beit El Synagogue in Jerusalem, the elite seclusion centre for developing and praying in the Lurianic system. Over time, Kabbalistic practices became popular among the Yemenite Jews to the point that the Baladi community became localized as a significant population only around the area of Yemen's capital city, Sana'a. Today, as the majority of Yemenite Jewry are outside of Yemen and in closer contact with Ashkenazi and Sephardi Jews, it could be perceived that the proportion with which the Dor Daim perspective is spreading (though in a different form than the original) is not much different from the rate at which Yemenite Jews as a whole are giving up their unique traditions and assimilating into mainstream Judaism.

=== Formation of movement ===
Dor Daim emerged as a recognizable force in the 19th century. The Dor Daim movement was formed by individuals displeased by the influence of Kabbalah, which had been introduced to Yemen in the 17th century. They believed that the core beliefs of Judaism were rapidly diminishing in favor of the mysticism of the Kabbalah. Displeased by the direction that education and the social development of Yemen were taking, they opened their educational system in Yemen. They were also unhappy with the influence that Kabbalists had on various customs and rituals (e.g. the text of the prayer book), in addition to a strong superstitious influence, which they saw as contrary to Maimonides. For example, Yosef Qafeh relates one of many Yemenite customs, "חינוך הבית", whereby they would bake plain bread without salt and prepare "the table of appeasement." Inviting more than 10 children aged seven or eight who waited outside, they set the table, scattering thin-ash upon it; crumbled the plain bread into bits, placing them upon the table holding the ashes; and exited the kitchen stating, to the shedim, "this is your portion." Shortly thereafter, they would abruptly open their doors, whereupon the children burst in, grabbing the saltless pieces and eating them. Yiḥyah Qafiḥ sharply opposed these minhagim, thinking that, in addition to the stupidity of the matter, they are Biblically forbidden because they are superstitons ("customs of the Amorites").

The Dor Daim considered the Kabbalists irrational and felt that they were thereby contributing to a decline in the social and economic status of the Yemenite Jews. These issues led Yiḥyah Qafiḥ to spearhead the Dor Daim movement. Among its goals was the revival and protection of what it saw as the original form of Judaism as codified by the Sanhedrin during the 1st through 3rd centuries.

Some scholars in Yemen and Israel did not receive the movement well. Especially controversial were the views of the Dor Daim on the most popularized book of Kabbalah known as the Zohar. These views are put forth in a book called Milhamoth HaShem (Wars of the Lord). A group of Jerusalem rabbis published an attack on Qafiḥ under the title of Emunat Hashem (Faith of the Lord), taking measures to ostracize members of the movement; notwithstanding, not even the Yemenite rabbis who opposed the dardaim heeded this ostracism. Instead, they intermarried, sat together in batei midrash, and continued to sit with Yiḥyeh Qafeh in beth din.

From this time Yemenite Jews may be classified as Shami, mainstream Baladi and Dor Dai or "Rambamist". A term frequently used by Dor Daim for Yemenites who accept the Zohar is Iqq'shim (Hebrew: עקשים), i.e., "obscurantists".

An important later Yemenite authority was Yiḥyah Qafiḥ's grandson, Yosef Qafiḥ, who edited many important works by Maimonides and Saadia Gaon (see his published works) as well as issuing two new editions of the Baladi prayer book. Unlike his grandfather, he avoided expressing any opinion on the Zohar beyond saying that it was preferable to draw one's spiritual sustenance from the works of Maimonides. Therefore, there is some doubt about whether Qafiḥ junior should be regarded as a Dor Dai or a mainstream Baladi. His intention was probably to reconcile the two groups, in the same way as tried to reconcile traditionalists and Kabbalists.

=== Dor Daim today ===
There is no official Dor Dai organization; thus, they are hard to identify. Many individuals are reluctant to identify themselves by that name for fear of persecution. Some of the original Dor Dai synagogues in Israel survive but have moved nearer to the mainstream Baladi tradition in the same way as Yosef Qafiḥ. Similarly, there is no universally recognized leader for the movement. The successor of Yosef Qafiḥ as leader of the Yemenite community as a whole is generally considered to be Ratzon Arusi of Qiryat Ono.

Today's adherents have great respect for the Yemenite tradition in general. They are not exclusively Yemenite in origin and may describe themselves as "talmide ha-Rambam" (disciples of Maimonides) rather than as "Dor Daim." In 2005, there was a widely publicized gathering of hilltop settlers of Yemenite descent describing themselves as "Dor Daim", but it is unclear how far these represent the historic Dor Dai movement.

== Beliefs ==
=== Theology ===
Dor Daim place particular importance on the Jewish doctrine of the absolute unity of God, which they believe has been compromised by the popular forms of Kabbalah prevalent today. In support of this, they appeal to the philosophical writings of various Geonim and Rishonim such as Saadia Gaon, Bahya ibn Paquda, Judah Halevi and Maimonides. The following points concerning the Almighty's Unity are in particular emphasized both by Dor Daim and talmide ha-Rambam:

- He is Incomparable to any created thing
- He is neither male nor female, but due to the limitations of human speech, we must use certain terms allegorically and metaphorically to some extent to convey the fact that He does exist
- His existence is qualitatively different from all other existences, and all other existences depend upon Him and are sustained by Him, while He remains infinitely and unfathomably distinct and independent from all creation
- He is one unity unlike any unity in creation; His Oneness is not a unity that can be divided or that is composed of parts, both of which could be the case only for a unity that is subject to time/space; Nor is His Oneness a one in the sense of a species or type.
- No quality of creation applies to Him: not space, not time, not change, no concept of a body, form, or image, no concept of filling a body, form, or any location, nor any other factor of creation - for He is Perfect and Sufficient in Himself and has no need for any of these. He is not a force or a power that possess or fills something else, nor is there any aspect of multiplicity in Him - as would be the case were the world literally to be within Him. Any Biblical or Talmudic phrases that imply that any quality of creation applies to Him must be understood as having some meaning other than its literal meaning, for He transcends all aspects of creation. None of them applies to Him.
- The Splendor of the Reality of His Being is so great that no mind can grasp even the smallest part of it, for He has no parts, as it says, "..and to His Greatness there is no investigating." (Psalms 145:3) Therefore, one must always be aware that the sublime Truth of His Being transcends anything we can ever express, but that all references to Him are either by speaking of what He is not or by way of literary tools such as metaphor.

=== Attitude to Kabbalah ===
In the 1931 'Milhamoth ha-Shem of Yiḥyeh Qafeḥ, the most fundamental issue the Dor Daim have with the popularly accepted understanding of Kabbalah concerns the absolute transcendent Singularity/Oneness of the Creator and the laws against avodah zarah. The Dor Daim believe that the popular forms of Kabbalah prevalent today are contrary to the absolute and incomparable Unity of the Creator and violate various laws against idolatry and polytheism, especially the prohibition against ribbuy reshuyoth (worshipping or conceiving of a multiplicity of reigns) referred to by Maimonides in his Mishneh Torah.

The issue is not the existence of Kabbalah as such. The word "Kabbalah" is used in older Jewish sources and by Maimonides to mean "tradition" and need not refer to mysticism. Furthermore, Dor Daim accept that in Talmudic times there was a secret mystical tradition in Judaism known as Maaseh Bereshith (the work of creation) and Maaseh Merkavah (the work of the chariot); Maimonides interprets these as respectively referring to something similar to Aristotelian physics and metaphysics as interpreted in the light of Torah. They reject that this tradition is represented by the ideas popularly referred to as Kabbalah nowadays.

Neither Dor Daim nor talmide ha-Rambam are against mysticism per se. Yosef Qafiḥ, for example, published the ancient mystical text Sefer Yetzirah together with his translation of Saadia Gaon's commentary. Likewise, Bahya ibn Paquda and Abraham Maimonides (sometimes described as "Jewish Sufis") are especially respected among Dor Daim and talmide ha-Rambam.

In particular, a Dor Dai is not bound to reject the theory of the ten sefirot as set out in the Sefer Yetzirah. In the Sefer Yetzirah, unlike in later Kabbalah, there is no question of the Sefirot being Divine entities or even attributes: they are simply the numerals, considered as the dimensional parameters used in the creation of the world.

What they view as the problem comes in with the Bahir and the Zohar, where the sefirot have become hypostatized as Divine attributes or emanations, and it seems that religious devotions can never be addressed directly to the En Sof (the Absolute), but only through one or other of the sefirot; and in modern Nusach Sefard prayer books, each occurrence of the Tetragrammaton is vocalized differently in a kind of code to show which sefira one should have in mind. This problem is compounded in the teachings of Isaac Luria as found in the writings of Hayyim ben Joseph Vital, where it is held that as a result of some catastrophe in Heaven, the Sefirot vessels have fractured. Their channels reformed into a variously stated number of inter-relating personalised aspects within God's Manifestation known as partzufim (Ancient Greek: πρόσωπα, romanized: faces), teaching that the purpose of each religious observance is to assist their unification. This is felt as being uncomfortably close to polytheism.

The original Dor Daim, such as Yiḥyah Qafiḥ, condemned the Zohar as an outright forgery filled with idolatry. Some of today's Dor Daim take a somewhat more moderate stance, allowing that the Zohar may contain elements of authentic Midrash together with a great deal of later interpolation, while considering the Zohar in its present form to be an unsafe guide, both to theology and to practice. By contrast, however, all Orthodox Denominations within Judaism today accept the authenticity of the Zohar, and it continues to be studied across the world, in Sephardic and Ashkenzaic communities. Great Jewish leaders such as Yosef Karo, Solomon Luria, Elijah of Vilna, Israel Kagan and many others have made extensive use of the Zohar in their seminal works. Since its rediscovery in the late 13th Century, the Zohar has been accepted by virtually all Orthodox Jewish schools of thought.

Another matter of dispute between Dor Daim and the Kabbalists concerns the Dor Daim's rejection of the concept gilgulim, the idea of reincarnation in Judaism. [citation needed] They support their rejection with writings of Saadia Gaon (892-942) who dismissed reincarnation as an unauthentic Jewish belief. Non-Dor Dai disciples of Maimonides and many mainstream Orthodox Jews share this perspective.

Dor Daim and Meqoriim in general disapprove of the common practice of visiting the graves, shrines, or monuments of saints, even if an individual does not request from a force other than the Almighty. Basing themselves on Talmudic sources codified in the Mishneh Torah, they believe this to be a prohibition instituted by the Sages of the Great Court established under Moses - the Sanhedrin. They generally consider this prohibition to have been instituted as a means to distance the people of Israel from the possibility of transgressing what Meqoriim consider to be the Biblical prohibitions of establishing a "monument" (prohibited even without any connection to idolatry) and from invoking any force other than the Almighty. They state that this is the same reason Jewish tradition explains why Moses' burial place is deliberately unknown.This all is in stark contrast to the mainstream custom of visiting Jewish graves (e.g. on the Eve of Rosh Hashana) and praying there, as brought in the Shulchan Aruch and Mishna Beruruah without controversy. Indeed, the custom is well rooted in Talmudic sources and the works of the Rishonim. Some examples are that Joseph cried at his mother's grave before going to Egypt (Sefer ha- Yashar); Before being exiled, the Jewish people wept at Rachel's Tomb (Rashi, Vayechi 48:7); Caleb prayed at The Cave of the Patriarchs before confronting the spies (Sotah 34b). See also Ta’anis 23b.

=== Jewish law ===
Dor Daim disapprove of what they believe to be an abandonment of a number of Talmudic practices on the part of a large portion of the Jewish world in favor of newer customs and innovations, some of which, in their opinion, are even contrary to Talmudic law. In particular this disapproval is aimed at customs derived from the Kabbalah, but it is not confined to them. In their view, and still more in the view of the talmide ha-Rambam, there is simply no constitutional authority in Jewish law to institute new rules or practices, whether in the direction of leniency or of severity, since the demise of the Sanhedrin in 425 CE, or at the latest the closure of the Talmud, and the role of later rabbis is confined to teaching and codification of the law as it stood at that date. They do not claim that this position is ideal, and would gladly see a revived Sanhedrin sort out the problems in Jewish law, provided that it was itself established in strict conformity to law.

In their view, the Mishneh Torahof Maimonides is the most accurate and therefore most authoritative statement of Talmudic law, and is in itself a sufficient reference without resort to any other source. Maimonides writes that if the Mishneh Torahwas intended to be explained by the Talmud he wouldn't have written the Mishneh Torah. Furthermore, the current text of the Talmud is fairly corrupt with numerous textual variants; from this, coupled with Maimonides' indications that he had far more accurate and complete Talmudic texts available to him, they conclude that the Mishneh Torah provides the best access to what the Talmud must originally have intended.

Unlike many of the later talmide ha-Rambam, the original Dor Daim were not committed to the view that all local custom, whether Sephardi or Ashkenazi or from any other source, is totally illegitimate to the extent that it differs from normative Jewish law (as best stated, in their view, by Maimonides), so they preserved certain non-Maimonidean Yemenite peculiarities in minor matters. However they did believe, in reliance on old authorities such as Joseph Caro and David ibn abi Zimra, that the views of Maimonides ought to be authoritative not only in Yemen but also in Eretz Yisrael, Egypt and the Near East generally.

There is a link between the Dor Daim's stance on Jewish law and on the other issues, as one argument for accepting the Mishneh Torah as the best restatement of Jewish law is that most of the later codifiers, including Joseph Caro, were believers in Kabbalah and should therefore not be accepted as authorities. As against this, many (e.g. Yeshayahu Leibowitz) argue that Caro and the others were operating within the rigorous rules of halachic reasoning and that their conclusions were in no way affected or invalidated by their personal theological views (just as, from the opposite perspective, Maimonides' status as a halachic authority is not affected by his acceptance of Greek philosophy). The Dor Daim reply to this is that Caro specifically allows the Zohar as a (limited and subordinate) source of rulings in Jewish law, so that his code includes practices found in Kabbalistic texts without basis in Talmudic texts. This ignores, however, that Caro was not the first to quote the Zohar as a matter of Jewish Law, as he was preceded by Jacob Ben Judah Landau (d. 1493) author of Agur, who cites the Zohar 3 times in his work.

== Practices ==
Those aspects of Jewish/Talmudic law which Dor Daim may emphasize, be particularly passionate about, and/or consider to have been cast aside by large portions of the Jewish world include:

- laws on 'avodah zarah' (forbidden forms of worship/idolatry) which they hold prohibits any use of intermediaries or mediators between oneself and the One Creator, prohibits praying or making requests to unseen forces such as past Rabbis or Sefirot, or supplicating to any unseen being other than the One Absolute Being - Y/H/W/H, and not doing any specific acts of religious devotion to any thing other than He;
- laws of legislation relating to the function and necessity of the Great Court (the Sanhedrin)
- laws concerning the settlement of the Land of Israel by the People of Israel as elaborated upon in Hilkhoth Melakhim u'Milhamotheham in the Mishneh Torah;
- certain laws concerning kashruth, such as Halita - immersing meat into boiling water before cooking;
- preservation of proper and exact pronunciation of all the Hebrew letters and Hebrew grammar (although there are minute differences even amongst the Dor Daim);
- emphasizing memorization of the Ḥumash (the Torah/Law of Moses); for example, each of the seven individuals called up to read from a Sefer Torah (Torah scroll) reads out loud the particular section of that week's parasha (section) upon which he said a blessing, as opposed to other customs in which there is a single, set reader. (This custom arose from there existing some people who did not know the cantillations by heart, and would be embarrassed to read in public);
- that unmarried females should also wear a head-covering, and not only married women.
- that one should strive to wear a Tallit Gadol and or Tefillin as much as permitted by Talmudic law whenever possible. In various areas of Israel, including Jerusalem, one may see individuals wearing the Tallit Gadol during 'Erev Shabbat' (Friday night) hanging over or wrapped over their shoulders in a manner distinct from the majority custom, when almost no other Jews would be wearing a Tallit Gadol. Even children under 13 can be seen wearing a Tallit Gadol among them.

Dor Daim usually use Yosef Qafiḥ's edition of the Baladi prayer book. This is on the lines of the prayer book of the Maharitz, and therefore contains some Kabbalistic insertions, enabling the book to be used by mainstream Baladi Jews. However, these insertions are clearly marked by footnotes as being later additions. Dor Daim can therefore use this prayer book and simply omit these additions.

== Similarities and differences with other groups ==
=== Mainstream Baladi Jews ===
As previously explained, the Baladi/Shami distinction does not always coincide with the Dor Daim/Iqshim distinction. That is, while a Dor Dai is necessarily a Baladi, and a Shami is necessarily an Iqshi (Kabbalist), most Baladim occupy an intermediate point on the spectrum and may or may not accord some validity to Kabbalah.

The distinguishing mark of a Baladi individual or community is the use of the traditional liturgy, regardless of the underlying theological or intellectual orientation. Some Baladim may sympathize to a greater or lesser extent with the Dor Dai distrust of Zoharic and Lurianic Kabbalah. Others may accept the Lurianic version of Kabbalah but retain the ancestral liturgy on the ground that, even according to Luria, this is the Kabbalistically correct thing to do. Others again may have no particular views one way or the other. However, Baladim of all shades uniformly accept the Mishneh Torah rather than the Shulchan Aruch as their authority on Jewish law.

Outwardly the practices of Baladi Jews and Dor Daim are almost identical, apart from some Kabbalistic insertions to be found in the Baladi prayer book. However most Baladim, while holding that the Mishneh Torah is the best interpretation of Jewish law, are content to preserve it as the particular custom of their group and do not seek to delegitimize the customs of other Jewish communities. (How far the Dor Daim seek to do this is a matter of debate.)

Several of the above-listed distinctions between Dor Daim and the majority of world Jewry are shared by all traditional Baladi Yemenite Jews, and not just by Dor Daim. On matters of law and practice as opposed to theology, the only difference between Dor Daim and the rest of Baladi Yemenite Jews appears to be the level of zeal in preserving the above listed practices, although exceptions do exist.

=== Talmide ha-Rambam ===
Today's talmide ha-Rambam differ from the original Dor Daim in two ways.

- Talmide ha-Rambam do not necessarily reject the Zohar. However, their interpretation may differ more or less drastically from the Lurianic school or the currents of thought popularly referred to as "Kabbalah" today.
- Talmide ha-Rambam tend to hold that the Mishneh Torahis the best restatement of Talmudic law, and that every custom that diverges from it is logically inferior if not actually illegitimate. On points not explicitly covered by Maimonides, such as the exact mode of prostration during prayers, there is considerable competition to unearth the most authentic mode from among the various Yemenite practices found in recorded history. Dor Daim, by contrast, do retain some current Yemenite practices, even when (according to the talmide ha-Rambam) these diverge from the views of Maimonides (see under Jewish law above). For example, they do not follow Maimonides' recommendation to eliminate all prayers prior to the Kaddish and Shema in order to avoid 'unnecessarily burdening the congregation'.

In short, talmide ha-Rambam are less extreme than Dor Daim about the Zohar and more extreme about "Maimonides-only" jurisprudence. Nevertheless, the similarities between the two groups, as expressed in the list of beliefs and practices above, overwhelmingly outnumber the differences.

As stated, talmide ha-Rambam differ from Dor Daim in that they are not confined to the Yemenite community and need not be committed to specifically Yemenite customs. Nonetheless, Yemenite scholarship and practice are still a major resource for them. Two good examples of this are seen in the works of Yosef Qafiḥ and of Mechon-Mamre.org.

- Yosef Qafiḥ has made various contributions to Dor Daim, talmide ha-Rambam and the Jewish world as a whole. Examples of his contributions include his encyclopedic commentary to the entire Mishneh Torahset to the renowned Yemenite text of the Mishneh Torah, his translation of all of Maimonides' Commentary on the Mishnah from Arabic into modern Hebrew, as well as translations of the Guide for the Perplexed, Duties of the Heart, Sefer Kuzari, and a number of other works.
- Mechon-Mamre.org has produced software for learning the Ḥumash, Tanakh, Mishnah, the Talmudic texts, as well as the Mishneh Torahaccording to Qafiḥ and its own accurate and scholarly text, intended to be beneficial to all. The Mechon-mamre.org website's "About" section states that most participants in the work of Mechon-Mamre are Baladi Yemenite Jews, although some of the more impacting individuals of Mechon-Mamre.org are not Yemenite or Dor Daim at all, but merely promote observance of Talmudic law as codified in the Mishneh Torah.

Dor Daim and "Rambamists" are most easily recognized by the manner in which their Tzitzit are tied (according to the Rambam, despite slight variations in understanding). Temani/Rambam Tzitzit can be distinguished from those of the many 'knitted kippa' youths who have adopted the same style, but have added Tekhelet. Rambamists and Baladim are also noticeable by the fact that they wear their Tallit in a different manner from non-Yemenite Jews, and even wear it on Friday nights/Erev Shabbath, which is almost unheard of in non-Yemenite synagogues (apart from a handful of Hasidim in Jerusalem, referred to as Yerushalmis, who wear it very discreetly so as to not look arrogant).

=== Gaonists ===
Dor Daim as well as non-Yemenite or non-Dor Dai students of the Rambam all find a certain level of commonality with individuals who sometimes call themselves Gaonists. Gaonists aim at applying Jewish law in everyday life according to the writings of the Geonim as a whole without singling out any one particular Gaon or codification of Jewish law over another. The commonality between all of these groups is sourced in their shared pursuit of living according to the original understanding of Talmudic law as much as possible with as little influence from the effects of almost 2,000 years of exile as possible. These groups together are sometimes referred to as Meqoriim (originalists/followers of the originals).

=== Mitnaggedim and followers of the Vilna Gaon ===
The dispute between Dor Daim and Aqashim has some similarities to that between Mitnaggedim and Hasidim, with the Vilna Gaon and his heirs standing for Talmudic intellectualism and a Halachic worldview like Yiḥyah Qafiḥ. However, unlike Dor Daim, mainstream Mitnagdim/Litvish Jews venerate the Zohar and Luria, and like the Hasidim their elite write Kabbalistic commentaries. Joseph Dan writes that there is no truth to the popular notion that the Mitnaggedim were more rationalist than the Hasidim; Lurianic notions dominate in the theologies of both camps. Their dispute can be seen as a battle within two conceptions of Lurianic kabbalah; the Mitnaggedim being faithful to received Kabbalah, while the Hasidim introduced new conceptions into theirs, particularly new conceptions of mystical leadership. On the whole, Mitnagdic-Litvish Judaism accepted Kabbalah, but had a distinctive "intellectualist" understanding of it.

Different interpretations of Luria arose among his followers regarding whether tzimtzum (withdrawal of Divinity from Creation) should be taken literally or metaphorically. Hasidism read it metaphorically and immanently, leading to Panentheism. Mitnaggedism read it transcendentally in relation to Man, leading to Theism, though allowing validity to Panentheism solely from the Divine perspective. Shneur Zalman of Liadi accused the Vilna Gaon of taking tzimtzum literally and not following Luria fully, though Mitnaggedic Kabbalists rejected this. It seems that the Vilna Gaon, who wrote extensive Kabbalistic works, followed the Lurianic system, but diverged from Luria when he felt the Zohar lent itself to another approach. The issue is the subject of forewords to the main texts of Lithuanian Kabbalah: the introduction, by Ḥayyim of Volozhin, to the Vilna Gaon's commentary to the Sifra di-Tsniuta and Yitzchak Eizik Chaver's Pitchei Shearim.

Paradoxically, the Chabad philosophical school of Hasidic thought created by Shneur Zalman of Liadi, an offshoot movement of its own from Hasidic emotionalist faith, routinely embraced perspectives from Maimonidean and other medieval Jewish philosophy within its textual system. To an extent Shneur Zalman personally modelled himself after Maimonides, and his Tanya after the Guide of the Perplexed. The 7th Lubavitcher Rebbe likewise extolled Maimonides as a history shaping leader, and created a daily study program in Mishneh Torah. Chabad leaders read the human wisdom of Maimonides' Guide and the Divine wisdom of Lurianic Kabbalah as partial theological aspects of their inclusive essence mystical study of Divinity. In contrast the Vilna Gaon, a Kabbalist of a traditionalist type, had no use for philosophy, declaring he only learned 3 things from it. Haskalah attempts to claim him as one of their own were entirely misplaced. Although proficient in, and recommending the necessity for mathematics and sciences to understand the Talmud, and highly astute in lower textual critical emendation of Judaic texts, while revering Maimonides for his holiness and legal greatness, the Gaon berated Rambam for being "misled by the accursed philosophy" in rejecting demons, incantations and amulets. Both Hasidic and Mitnagdic Kabbalists entirely rejected the physical literalist interpretations of Kabbalah by Sabbatean movements as idolatrous. The Baal Shem Tov himself declared that esoteric study of Kabbalah symbolism outside his Hasidic inner soul holiness experiential psychologisation of it, by those not purified, was forbidden and lead to the Sabbatean false physical anthropomorphism of it by their impure desires, the cardinal conceptual sin in Kabbalistic understanding. He said this at a time and in the same vicinity where Frankism had taken Kabbalah into antinomian and nihilist desecration of Torah.

In his Nefesh HaHayyim, Chaim of Volozhin, founder of the Litvish Yeshiva movement and main theorist of Mitnaggedism, responds to the theology of Schneur Zalman's Tanya based on different interpretation of the same Kabbalistic sources. Their difference revolves around alternate identifications between Divine Immanence/Transcendence and Divine Monism/Pluralism. For Hayyim Volozhin and Mitnaggedic-Litvish Judaism: Man relates to transcendent Theism intellectually through Talmud and Halacha, rather than to immanent Panentheism through Hasidic devekut. Kabbalah is reserved for the elite, rather than popularised in Hasidism. Elite Mitnaggedic prayer uses Kabbalistic worldview to relate to the ultimate non-existence of Creation from the Divine perspective. For the mainstream, spirituality is through Talmudic study and Halachic worldview for its own sake.

Regarding Halacha, those of the Vilna Gaon's successors who were associated with the Volozhin yeshiva, such as the Brisker group and in particular Chaim Soloveitchik, had a very high regard for the Mishneh Torah and held it as the best tool for the theoretical understanding of the Talmud and of Jewish law generally. When however it came to practical legal rulings, an activity of which they steered clear when possible, they adhered to the normative Ashkenazi version of Halakha, as set out in the Shulchan Aruch and the glosses of Moses Isserles.

There are various groups in Israel today which claim to follow the Vilna Gaon. These may be found in places as diverse as the Neturei Karta and the fringes of Religious Zionism, the latter group being represented by the Aderet Eliyahu yeshiva. Their intellectualist orientation has some similarities to that of the Dor Daim, though also venerating Kabbalah.

Some Modern Orthodox misnagdim such as Yeshayahu Leibowitz reject Zoharic Kabbalah and praise the work of Yiḥyah Qafiḥ.

=== Spanish and Portuguese Jews ===
Dor Daim and other Yemenite talmide ha-Rambam like to compare themselves to the Spanish and Portuguese Jews, and think of them as "the other Rambam Jews". This is largely because of their shared scepticism about the Zohar. The resemblance has however been exaggerated.

Spanish and Portuguese Jews preserve an early form of the Sephardic liturgy from before the expulsion from Spain, which reflected some, but only very limited, influence from the Kabbalah and the Zohar. In the 16th and early 17th centuries they adopted a certain number of Lurianic observances in a piecemeal fashion, for example the Tu Bishvat seder. After the Sabbatai Zevi debacle these observances were largely dropped, because it was felt that Lurianic Kabbalah had contributed to the disaster. The arguments against the authenticity of the Zohar advanced by Jacob Emden and Leone di Modena were also influential. At the present day the general Spanish and Portuguese attitude to the Kabbalah is one of indifference rather than hostility. As Spanish and Portuguese communities act as hosts for Sephardi Jews of many other backgrounds, there would be no bar on individuals regarding Kabbalah more positively. In particular, the Lurianic Kabbalah had a following in the Jewish community of Livorno, which falls within the Spanish and Portuguese group but was the main point of contact between it and the Levantine Sephardim. The Spanish and Portuguese group's closest resemblance would therefore be not to Dor Daim but to mainstream Baladi Yemenites.

Spanish and Portuguese Jews admire Maimonides and identify with the Golden age of Jewish culture in Spain. However, they cannot be classified as "Rambamists" in the sense required, as their religious law is based squarely on the Bet Yosef of Joseph Caro, subject to certain liturgical customs peculiar to themselves. It could even be argued that they follow Caro more closely than any other group, as many other Sephardim, especially the eastern communities influenced by the Ben Ish Chai, regard Isaac Luria as having equal or even greater authority than Caro.

The above describes the attitude of traditional communities such as London and Amsterdam. In some newer communities, in particular among the followers of José Faur and Yaakov Oliveira, a more purist and principled attitude has evolved, which does place considerable emphasis on the Mishneh Torah; however they also utilize the Shulchan Aruch in their lectures in order to help promote the study of practical Jewish law amongst the greater Jewish community.

== Criticisms ==
1. Some claim Dor Daim and even all students of Maimonides are heretics because of their non-acceptance of Zohar and Lurianic Kabbalah. This claim depends on the assumption that the Lurianic Kabbalah is a dogma of Judaism binding upon all Jews. Not only the Dor Daim and talmide ha-Rambam, but many other Orthodox groups, such as the followers of the Vilna Gaon along with many of the non-Hasidic groups, would disagree with this assumption, regardless of whether or not they accept Lurianic Kabbalah. Such a view, according to Ovadia Yosef, does not make the Dor Daim heretics. Moreover, Rabbis Eliyahu Dessler and Gedaliah Nadel maintained that it is acceptable to believe that the Zohar was not written by Shimon bar Yochai and that it had a late authorship. Already over 200 years ago the Noda Bihudah, in his sefer Derushei HaTzlach, argued that the Zohar is to be considered unreliable as it came into our hands many hundreds of years after Rashbi's death and in the absence of an unbroken mesorah, among other reasons.

The Dor Dai response is that whether a person or school is heretical is a question of law, to be decided according to authoritative works of halakha: one is not a heretic simply for disagreeing with a widely held aggadic interpretation, unless the halakha specifically says so. The Mishneh Torahis comprehensive in scope and is, at the very least, one of the authoritative sources of halakha, so to follow it must be an acceptable way of doing Judaism. Accordingly, since the Dor Daim assert nothing that is not found within the four corners of the Mishneh Torah, and the Mishneh Torah cannot be interpreted as actually requiring belief in anything approaching Zoharic or Lurianic Kabbalah, they cannot be heretics - unless the Mishneh Torah itself is heretical, which is not held by any mainstream Jewish group.

2. Others believe that the main problem is not that Dor Daim do not follow Kabbalah for themselves, but that they delegitimize those who do follow it. Yiḥyah Qafiḥ, for instance, held that one must not use parchments written by, or eat meat slaughtered by, believers in Kabbalah because these are dedicated to Zeir Anpin (one of the partzufim of the 10 sephirot), a concept apparently distinct from the Unfathomable Almighty Creator.

Few Dor Daim take such an extreme view today, as most consider that the above reasoning makes Jewish law too uncertain in practice. Those who do take such a view would argue that it is not at all uncommon in Judaism for one group to treat as invalid the ritual acts or objects of another for technical or doctrinal reasons. That does not amount to an attempt to exclude the other group from Judaism.

3. A third criticism is that Dor Daim take works of Kabbalah too literally: it is intended to be myth and metaphor, and to subject it to rigorous analysis as the Dor Daim do is like trying to construe a work of poetry as if it were a statute. Works of Kabbalah themselves contain warnings that the teachings should not be exposed to common view or read too realistically, and that to do so is indeed to incur the danger of falling into heresy or idolatry.

The Dor Dai response to this is that, however this may be in theory, these warnings have not been observed. Kabbalah, in its most literal and "realistic" sense, has in fact been extensively popularised, with the result that many otherwise pious Jewish groups are now permeated with superstition, so that the whole enterprise is now more trouble than it is worth. Further, the claim that these works, on their true interpretation, are harmless metaphorical imagery fully compatible with monotheism is disingenuous: the origins of most Kabbalistic concepts in pagan systems such as Neoplatonism and Gnosticism are too glaringly obvious to be ignored. (Dor Daim do not claim that Kabbalists are in fact polytheists: only that they are inconsistent.)

4. A fourth criticism is that it is a stultification of Jewish law to regard any authority, even one as eminent as Maimonides, as final. The essence of Oral Law is that it is case law rather than code law, and needs to be interpreted in each generation: otherwise the Mishneh Torah could simply have been handed down as part of the written Torah. For this reason, it is a principle of Jewish law that "Jephthah in his generation is as Samuel in his generation": one is bound by the current authorities, rather than by previous authorities however objectively superior.

The Dor Dai response to this is that the acceptance of Maimonides in the Yemenite community has always been regarded as a legitimate version of Jewish law, and that they are no more stultified by the authority of Maimonides than other Jewish communities are by the authority of the Shulchan Aruch. From the practical point of view Jewish law as codified by Maimonides is as compatible with modern conditions as any later code: if anything more so, as later Jewish law has become enmeshed in many unnecessary intellectual tangles. Suppose there are practical problems caused by this "static" view of Jewish law. In that case, that is part of the price of exile: the question is not whether a given reform would be desirable, but whether constitutional authority exists to make it, and in their view there is not.

5. A final criticism is that the Dor Dai version of Judaism is disquietingly reminiscent of militant Islamic trends such as Salafism. Both started out as modernising movements designed to remove some of the cobwebs and allow the religion to compete in the modern world, and both have ended up as fundamentalist groups lending themselves to alliances with political extremism. Both disapprove of mysticism (Kabbalah or Sufism) and praying at tombs; both tend to dismiss more moderate coreligionists as unbelievers (see Takfir); both cut out centuries of sophisticated legal scholarship in favour of an every-man-for-himself "back to the sources" approach.

The Dor Daim answer to this is:

1. Political militancy is no more characteristic of Dor Daim than of many Kabbalistically inspired branches of Religious Zionism (e.g. the followers of Zvi Yehuda Kook). In fact the conditions for political or military action, as laid down in the Mishneh Torah, are extremely strict and limited.
2. Neither Dor Daim nor talmide ha-Rambam are against mysticism per se: see Attitude to Kabbalah above. The attitude to Kabbalah is based on much more specific factors: if there is an analogue to their opposition among other religions, it is essentially an opposition to the espousal of concepts such as incarnation, pantheism, and panentheism - apart from the opposition to idolatry in general, as understood in the context of the Mishneh Torah.
3. The antagonism shared by Dor Daim and talmide ha-Rambam against praying at tombs etc. is distinct from the Salafi view in a number of ways. First, in contrast to the Salafi view, the Dor Dai / talmide ha-Rambam view is that this prohibition is Rabbinic, meaning that it is not a direct command from the Almighty. Rather, it is a "fence" to distance a Jew from the possibility of transgressing a more severe prohibition. They do not consider praying at or visiting a tomb to be idolatry, nor do they believe that this is prohibited to all people (i.e. non-Israelites). In contrast, the Salafi view is that this is forbidden to everyone as a severe prohibition.
4. It is wrong to accuse Dor Daim and talmide ha-Rambam of being extremists or of dismissing more moderate coreligionists as unbelievers: see reply to 2 above. On the contrary, they often find more in common theologically with sectors of Modern Orthodox Judaism than they do with much of the Ḥasidic or Ḥaredi communities.
5. The method of learning and religious observance aimed at them is firmly rooted in Jewish rabbinic authority (see Jewish law above). It is about as far from an "every-man-for-himself" approach as it is possible to get. How far a similar accusation may be true of Salafism (which is itself an umbrella description for a great many trends) is an independent question on which Dor Daim is not required to express a view.
6. Salafis typically reject the Islamic philosophy of the kind propounded by Avicenna and Averroes. Dor Daim, by contrast, finds strong inspiration in the closely related contemporary Jewish philosophies of Bahya ibn Pakuda and Maimonides.
7. Many Dor Daim and talmide ha-Rambam desire that the Jewish people as a nation will return to upholding the Almighty's Torah with the establishment of a central religious authority - a Sanhedrin reestablished according to Jewish law as only fully codified in the 'Mishneh Torah'. That is one form of the Messianic aspiration implicit in any form of Orthodox Judaism. It cannot be compared to the desire of some Islamists to reestablish a Khilafah by violent means if necessary.

== See also ==
- Thirteen Principles of Faith
