= Yihya Yitzhak Halevi =

Chief-Rabbi of Yemen in early 20th-century CE

Mori Yiḥya Yitzḥak Halevi
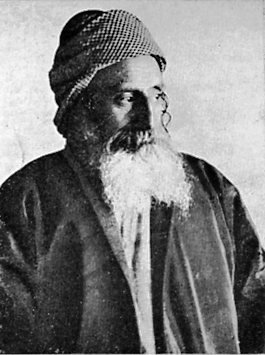
- Title: Chief Rabbi of Yemen

Personal life
- Born: יחיא יצחק הלוי; 1867 Sana'a
- Died: 1932 (aged 64–65) Sana'a
- Buried: Sana'a
- Children: Shalom Yitzḥak Halevi, chief rabbi in Tel Aviv
- Parent: Moshe (Musa) (father)
- Occupation: Ritual slaughterer, tanner

Religious life
- Religion: Judaism
- Denomination: Baladi-rite
- Profession: Rabbi and Judge
- Position: Av Beit Din (1902–1932)
- Organisation: Rabbinic court at Sana'a
- Residence: Sana'a

Yiḥya Yitzḥak Halevi, son of Moshe (Musa) Yitzḥak Halevi (Hebrew: יחיא יצחק הלוי also commonly known as Mori Yiḥya Yitzḥak from the house of Yitzḥak Halevi) (1867 – 1932), was a Yemeni born rabbinical scholar who served as one of the last great scholars and chief jurists of the rabbinic court at Ṣan‘ā’, which post he held for nearly thirty years, a time interrupted only during the siege laid to the city (Dec. 1904—Jan. 1906) by loyal Yemeni forces under Imām Yaḥyā Ḥamīd ad-Dīn (1904–1948) in their bid to oust the Ottoman Turks who then controlled the city. The Rabbi, meanwhile, had fled with his family to Dhamar.

== Early life ==
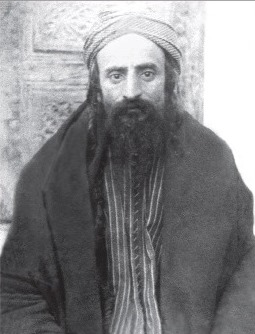
Rabbi Yiḥya Yitzḥak during younger years

Yiḥya Yitzḥak Halevi was born in Ṣan‘ā’, the eldest of ten children born unto Musa Yitzḥak, a tanner of hides by profession, and a descendant of one of the city's more illustrious Jewish families. Yiḥya Yitzḥak received his early education from his maternal grandfather, the Rabbi and kabbalist Shalom Mansura, and was already knowledgeable in the laws of ritual slaughtering at the early age of eleven. In 1880, at the age of thirteen, he began to study the Talmud and the legal writings of the poskim, with other boys his own age, in the house of his grandfather, the said Rabbi Mansura, until his grandfather's death in 1883. Afterwards, he studied under the prominent scholars in the famous Maharitz synagogue in Ṣan‘ā’. The synagogue served at that time as the city's chief seat of learning. In the evenings, he would continue his studies in the midrashic school belonging to the great teacher, Rabbi Ḥayim Qoraḥ (d. 1914), where they studied Ein Yaakov and the Shulchan Arukh and their respective commentaries.

Around the age of seventeen he married his first wife, Saadah Khamri, who died after she had given birth to five children (two sons and three daughters), two of whom died in their youth. One of his two sons, Shalom Yitzḥak (Ishaq) Halevi (b. 1891), immigrated to the British Mandate of Palestine in 1923 and became the Chief Rabbi of the Yemenite Jewish community in Tel Aviv-Yafo (1925 – 1961), serving also as the Av Beit-Din in a rabbinic court (1925 – 1956) in Tel Aviv, and was an active member of the Chief Rabbinate Council in Jerusalem for nearly forty years. Yiḥya, not willing to remain a widower, took in marriage a second wife, Rumiyyah, the daughter of Suleiman Hibshush, by whom he had other children. The Rabbi's youngest son, Hayyim Yitzḥak Halevi (born 1920), eventually immigrated to the Land of Israel in the airlift known as "Operation Magic Carpet," and served as the Chief Rabbi of Herzliya between the years 1972–2005.

As most scholars of his generation, Yiḥya Yitzḥak Halevi was trained in the laws of ritual slaughter of livestock such as prescribed in Jewish law and when later tasked with the public affairs and oversight of the community, he would ordain qualified ritual slaughterers of domesticated animals throughout the country, and periodically inspected them.

He was the scion of a prominent rabbinic family, the Sasson Halevi family, who came to Yemen from Iraq prior to the time of Muhammad.

== Family origins ==
Although the family had lived in Yemen before the advent of Islam, the descendants of the illustrious Sasson Halevi of Iraq, the Bayt Yitzḥak Halevi family first rose to prominence during the return of the Jewish exiles from Mawza. In 1680, a certain man of this family, Rabbi Yeḥiya Halevi, was appointed governor over the affairs of the Jewish people. He begat a son, calling him by his own name, Yeḥiya, who in turn begat a son by the name of Shalom, who was the father of Abraham Al-Sheikh. He and his son, Shalom, became the first of their family to bear the name of Al-Sheikh, or "elder," owing to the king's great regard for this family.

Rabbi Yiḥya Yitzḥak Halevi and his family belonged to the Baladi-rite congregations of Yemen.

== Election and arrest ==
In 1902, at the young age of thirty-five, he was — on the basis of his scholarship and his counseling ability — one of the candidates for replacing the lately deceased Nasi and chief jurist of the rabbinic court at Sana'a, Rabbi Shelomo (Suleiman) Ṣaleh. The heads of the community in Sana'a came together at the synagogue known as Bayt Saleh, which served at that time as the general seat of learning and of halakhic determination, in order to select a replacement. After much deliberation as to how to proceed, it was decided that lots would be cast, the names of the candidates written upon pieces of paper and pooled together, from which only one name would be drawn. The eldest of their Rabbis, the honorable Mori Hayim b. Yosef Qorah, a man then aged eighty, was he that was to draw the lot. The names were placed within the ark bearing the scrolls of the Law (Torah) and the doors were then shut. Mori Hayim Qorah then proceeded to recite one of the Psalms, wherein are to be found the words, "Thou maintainest my lot" (Ps. 16). The entire congregation recited aloud along with him in perfect unison the entire Psalm, while standing upon their feet. Expectations were high and could be seen on the faces of all those gathered in that place. When the Psalm's recital had come to an end, a great silence fell over the congregation. Mori Hayim Qorah put forth his hand into the ark and, with a trembling hand, he withdrew one slip of paper. He then called out to those there gathered, saying: "God's elect is Mori Yihya Yitzhak Halevi." Some began to murmur that perhaps there had been a mistake. The lot was repeated twice, and, again, a third time, with the results showing the same thing. A murmur could then be heard and felt by the people, some saying: Me’eth A-donai hoyǝtha zoth (This thing has come from the Lord). The lot had fallen to Rabbi Yihya, son of Moshe Yitzhak Halevi. When he perceived what had happened, and that he was elected to head the post of President, he concealed his face within his mantle, refusing to show himself. He later objected adamantly before the assembly who had gathered there, eventually fleeing from their presence. The men who had gathered at that place quickly followed after him until they reached his house. Yet, their pleas and platitudes were of no avail. He would not return with them to take up the office of President of the Court. Neither would the assembly cast lots again, a fourth time, so there remained in the Court at Sana'a only one, a certain Rabbi Ibrahim, the son of R. Sāleh, to adjudicate as judge, seeing that he was singularly qualified to pass judgment by himself. Yet, in matters which required three judges, he was joined by Rabbi Shalom b. Yiḥya Hibshush, the author of Shoshannat Ha-Melekh, and by Rabbi Hayim Hacohen. It was not until after the death of Rabbi b. Yihya Hibshush in the famine of 1905 that Rabbi Yihya Yitzhak Halevi decided to assume the role of leader of Yemen's community.

Only one year after Rabbi Yiḥya Yitzḥak's election, in 1903, the Rabbi and his fellow judges were accused of usurping authority over the Muslim judge (Ar. al-qāḍi), and he was arrested and put in prison, while his feet were shackled in fetters of iron. He was released owing to his unrelenting protests and his patient endurance.

When the siege was lifted in early 1906, Sana'a was decimated of more than half its population because of the famine within the city. Among the dead was the great Rabbi and scholar Shalom b. Yihya Hibshush, author of Shoshannat Ha-Melekh. In the spring of 1906, Rabbi Yiḥya Yitzḥak Halevi was confirmed by the ruling monarch as one of four representatives of the Jewish community in Sana'a, along with Harun al-Cohen, Yiḥya al-Qafiḥ and Yiḥya al-Abyadh. The document outlined the obligations of the Jewish community toward the Muslim State and the Poll Tax (Ar. al-jizya) assessed against every male 13 years of age and older.

=== Return of the Imam ===
Spurred on by the news that the Imam would be returning to Sana'a, one of the first things Rabbi Yiḥya Yitzḥak did upon assuming the role of community leader was to appoint a new rabbinic court, whose former members had mostly perished in the famine of 1905. He appointed Amram Qaruḥ (Qoraḥ) and Hayim Mishreqi. The Rabbi, following the practice of the early courts of Jewish law, also appointed Rabbi Yiḥya Naḥum of al-Shaghadra (born 1875) to be his agent and inspector of the ritual slaughter of livestock throughout the provinces (since Jews were not permitted to eat of the slaughter made by non-Jews, and could only make-use of what was slaughtered by one who was adequately trained in such laws and who possessed a valid license), and to instruct those who were found negligent, and to confirm those who were adept in their ritual slaughter and in removing the suet; as also conduct controversies arising over bills of divorce and betrothals. Rabbi Yiḥya Yitzḥak also bought a new house in the center of the Jewish Quarter so as to be nearer to his protégés. He would also attend the lessons conducted by Rabbi Yiḥya al-Qafih in the Bayt-Midrash on Saturday nights, and prayed there on Saturday mornings.

When the Imām Yaḥyā Ḥamīd ad-Dīn entered the city, he was greeted in full-force by the Jewish community who had purchased an ox from the monies donated to the public coffer and given it to the Imam as a welcoming present, which was duly slaughtered and eaten by his entourage. This act assured that the Jews would be protected by their Muslim patrons under the Imam. For the event, Rabbi Yihya Qafih prepared a welcoming address in Arabic, which he read before the king and his entourage.

=== City recaptured by the Turks ===
When the Ottoman Turks returned to capture the city in 1907, Rabbi Yiḥya Yitzḥak Halevi remained in favor with the ruling power and concerned himself with public affairs during the day, and with making ritual slaughter on domesticated animals in the evening. The city prospered under the Turks. When the Turkish military commander, Ahmad Fawzi Bashi was replaced in 1909 by Muhammad Ali Bashi, he financed the building of a Jewish school and had once paid a visit to the school to make a test of their accomplishments. During this time, Yitzhak Halevi exchanged letters of communication with the chief rabbi of the Ottoman Empire, Rabbi Chaim Nahum Effendi. It was during the Turkish occupation of Sana'a that Rabbi Yiḥya Yitzḥak Halevi was conferred the honorary title of Ḥakham Bāshī (the Sage dignitary). Under the Imam, Jews were initially prohibited from building or establishing new synagogues, but during Ottoman rule three new synagogues were opened in Sana'a, one of which in the house of Rabbi Yiḥya Yitzḥak Halevi.

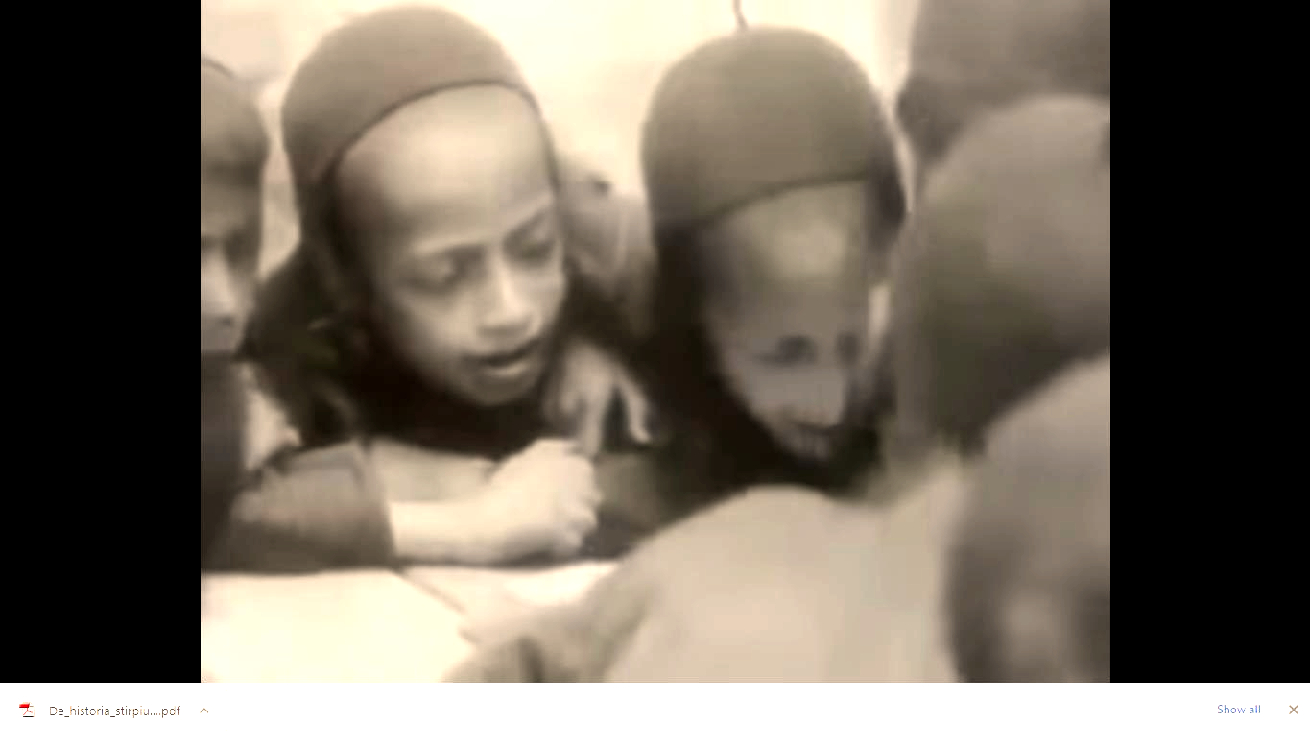
"Talmud Torah", Jewish boys studying together in Sana'a, in 1929

When the Imam retook the city in 1911, he closed the three new synagogues, which remained closed for fifteen years. Notwithstanding, Rabbi Yiḥya Yitzḥak Halevi found favor in the eyes of the king, the king conferring upon him the governance over the Jewish people, with more extended powers to collect the annual Poll-Tax of the Protected persons of the State (Ar. al-dhimmiyūn) from the local Jewish administrators throughout the provinces, and to make use of the king's soldiers, if need be, to arrest offenders of orthodox Jewish law.

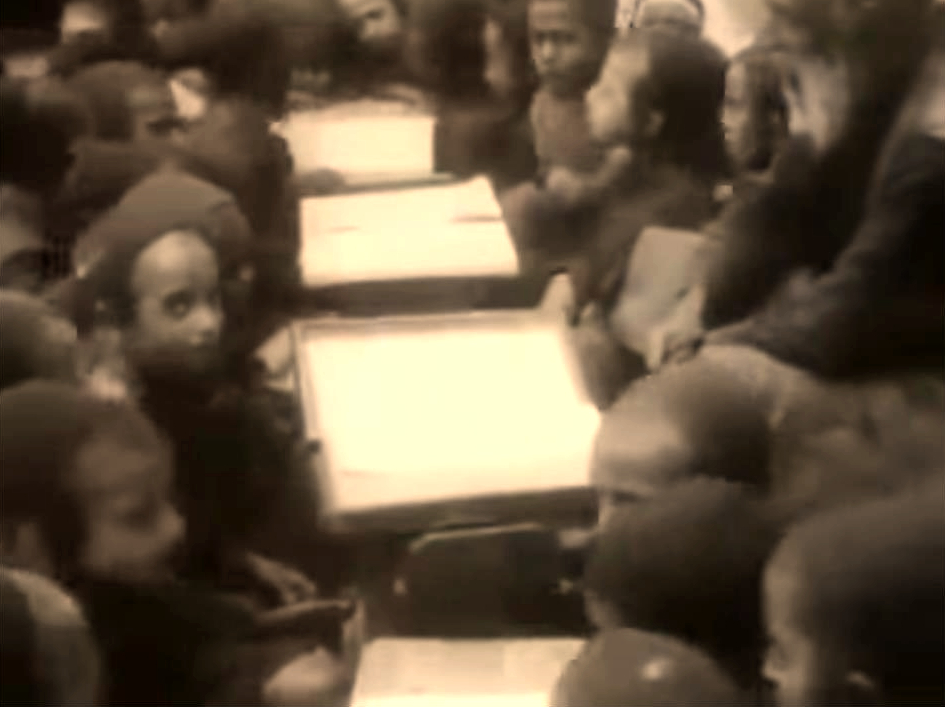
Jewish "Cheder" in Sana'a 1929

The Chief Rabbi's first test came in 1920, one week before Passover, when he was called upon to intervene in the release of Jewish silversmiths who had conspired with the rebellious elder son of the king who had employed them in minting coins under his own name, in defiance of his father, and were all arrested. Rabbi Yiḥya Yitzḥak Halevi appealed to the king on their behalf, who permitted them to be released in time to observe the upcoming holiday with their families.

During Carl Rathjens' visit with the chief rabbi (either in 1927 or 1931), he copied down the names of the towns and villages settled by Jews in Yemen from a list made available to him by the rabbi and taken from the tax rolls, for which he was accountable to the king. The total number of Jewish communities in Yemen he puts at 371. The jizyah (poll-tax) collected annually from every Jewish adult male by the Chief Rabbi amounted to one Maria Theresa thaler (riyal) for a poor man, two of the same coins in specie for the middle classes, and four or more thalers for the rich.

As chief jurist in Sana'a, Rabbi Yiḥya Yitzḥak Halevi was later joined by fellow judges, Mori Yiḥya b. Suleiman Qafiḥ and by Mori Avraham al-Kohen, and often by Mori Yehiya b. Salam Abyadh, who eventually succeeded Rabbi Yiḥya Yitzḥak as chief jurist in 1932, following the death of the Chief Rabbi. In 1911, he and his fellow jurists answered some twenty-six questions posed to the court in Sana'a by the chief rabbi of Ottoman Palestine, Rabbi Abraham Isaac Kook. Many of the court documents and responsa originating from Sana'a during this period bear these men's signatures.

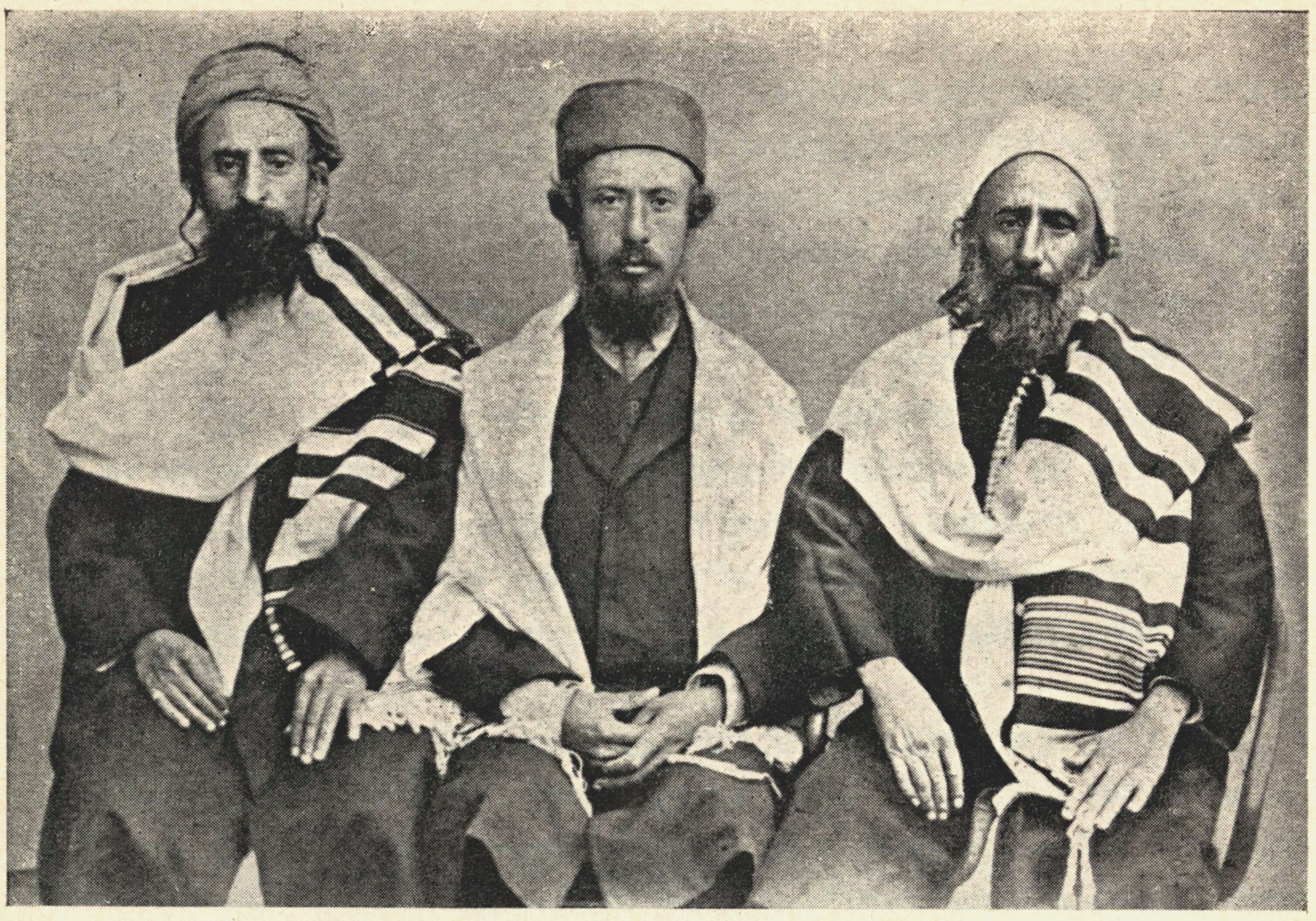
Chief Rabbi (L) in 1911, sitting with Zionist emissary, Shemuel Yavne'eli (C), and the Rabbi's father-in-law, Suleiman Hibshush (R)

=== Veiling of Jewish women ===
When the Imam returned to Sana'a, some of the Muslims had come to him complaining that Jewish wives customarily go forth in the public domain without an adequate covering over their heads, viz. their faces were uncovered, against that practice of married women of Islam who walk while covered from their heads to the soles of their feet, and their faces veiled. The Imām, being a defender of the Jews, requested from Mori Yiḥya Yitzḥak to do what he could about the matter, in order to bring to silence those who railed on the Jewish custom. Mori Yiḥya Yitzḥak called for a consultation about the matter, and laid out before them the complaint of the Muslims, and the request that had come to him from the king, Yahyā. During the consultation, it was agreed upon to make an edict that Jewish women would henceforth go out into the public domain while their faces veiled out of modesty. Formerly, Jewish women went with many coverings upon their heads; scarves covered by other scarves. By the time of the mass emigration from Yemen, most Jewish women did not go in the footsteps of their mothers, and would only wear two coverings upon their heads, but whenever they went out in public places (e.g. the marketplace) they would wear three coverings upon their heads. The first of these coverings was a white cloth worn over their hair, covered by two upper scarves.

The new edict, however, did not set well with a certain man of the community, who instructed his wife not to heed the new ruling of going out in public places with a veil, and under his prodding convinced other men to have their wives ignore the same ruling. Rabbi Yiḥya Yitzḥak Halevi conducted an inquest into who they were that wantonly annulled the edict, and when it was learnt that they had done so by order of their husbands, he commanded to have them arrested as punishment for their annulment of the decree.

== Dispute over secular education in Jewish schools and over Kabbalah ==
Although the two leading Rabbis often prayed and studied together, Rabbi Yiḥya Yitzḥak Halevi would eventually become the chief disputant in a case involving himself and Rabbi Yiḥya al-Qafiḥ over reforms that Rabbi Qafiḥ and his son, David, introduced into the curriculum in the new Jewish school built in 1909. Rabbi Yiḥya al-Qafiḥ, the headmaster, had pressed that Jewish students be taught arithmetic and the rudiments of the Arabic and Turkish languages and writing, and that the neo-kabbalistic books which espouse to Lurianic Kabbalah and the Zohar be diminished from the curriculum because of a concern that it inaccurately promotes pluralism/dualism in the godhead. This stance eventually caused a rift in the community, with the two leaders of the Jewish community and their protégés breaking off into dueling factions in 1912. Rabbi Yiḥya Yitzḥak Halevi coined the other faction by the name darda'im, which group was led by anti-kabbalist, Rabbi Yiḥya al-Qafiḥ, while he and his party were called "iqeshim". When they were unable to resolve their dispute, the matter was referred to the Third Shari'a Court of Sana'a in 1914 (anno Hijri 1332). It was the rule for litigants, if a case proved intractable before the Jewish court (bet din), to defer it to a Muslim court of law (qāḍi) or, in the case of villagers, to the local tribal authority, where it was decided according to the logic of customary law (taghut). The Muslim judge who ruled over this case was Muhammad b. Abbas al-Ḥūthī, whose verdict (Ar. fatwa) called out for the continuation of established Jewish customs and norms heretofore practised in Yemen, and that no party to the dispute is allowed to coerce others into changing his course of behavior or tradition. The judge's ruling was appended with a verdict from the king himself and affixed with the king's seal, in which he ruled: "What should be studied in their synagogues and seats of learning is that which Yiḥya Yitzḥak studies of that which is without innovation. (ghayr muḥdath)."

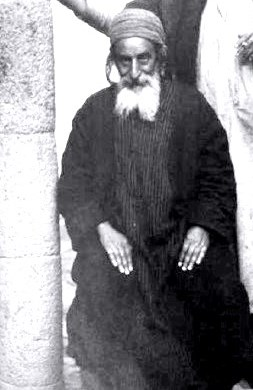
Mori Yitzḥak, Chief Rabbi of Yemen, during his latter years

The new school established by Rabbi Yiḥya al-Qafiḥ was, thereafter, closed. Ultimately, the Muslim verdict (fatwā) failed to resolve the dispute over the kabbalah, seeing that after the deaths of Rabbis Yiḥya Yitzḥak Halevi (d. 1932) and Yiḥya Qafiḥ (d. 1931), the controversy over the kabbalah reemerged.

=== Resolution of land ownership ===
At Rabbi Yiḥya Yitzḥak Halevi's suggestion, the king of Yemen (Imam Yahya) settled a long-standing dispute between the Jewish community and the application of laws defined by the local Waqf, or mortmain property. Accordingly, the land upon which the new Jewish Quarter was built following their return from Mawza was land provided by the king, but as of 1872, the Jews were required to pay a monthly tenancy fee for the land although they claimed ownership of the land, and which money accrued to the Muslim Waqf; being usufruct State land of which the State revenues are assured to pious foundations, in this case, for the upkeep of Muslim places of worship. The Rabbi suggested to the king that the Jews be permitted to purchase the land whereon they had resided, rather than pay tenancy fees for such land. The king acquiesced. In the winter of 1918, the Imam Yahya ordered that those Jewish residents who were able to provide legal documents proving that they had purchased their property would be made exempt from re-purchasing such property, while all other Jewish residents were to pay for their land, half of which payment would be given to the Waqf (Islamic trust), and half of which to the Imam. Assessors were sent to the Jewish Quarter, and it was decided that the Jews would pay 8000 Riyals (crowns) for acquisition of the land. In the end, only 7500 Riyals (crowns) were paid, while the Imam forgave the remaining 500 Riyals (crowns) for the sake of the poor. A bill of sale was drawn up to that effect.

== Death and legacy ==
Rabbi Yiḥya Yitzḥak Halevi died six months after the death of his disputant, Rabbi Yiḥyah Qafiḥ. He is remembered for being adamant in his efforts to preserve the community's unity, in the midst of rising contentions and disputes over the kabbalah, and not being willing to see his community broken-up by vying factions over ideology, especially with regard to practices heretofore observed by many of Yemen's elders. He was faced with daunting challenges, and was tasked with rebuilding a community that was devastated after the famine of 1905, a community which once numbered seven-thousand souls, and which had dwindled to a mere several hundred. His resolve and determination, and his nurturing of good ties with the ruling monarch, helped solidify his command and hegemony over the Jewish people throughout Yemen, and had been given the power to punish offenders by imprisonment. He was zealous over the preservation of Yemenite Jewish culture, and especially, the perpetuation of their peculiar manner of pronunciation of Hebrew, over the more popular Sephardic pronunciation of Hebrew, and worked diligently to save Jewish orphans from falling into the hands of the government and who would, otherwise, be forced to convert to Islam. He was seen by his protégés as the right man for the situation, considering the immense challenges facing the Jews of Yemen. Because of his tireless efforts on their behalf, they gave to him the time-honored title, borrowed from a biblical verse, "The angel who has delivered me from all evil." (Gen. 48:16)

Rabbi Yiḥya Yitzḥak Halevi was succeeded by Rabbi Yiḥya al-Abyadh (the king's minter of coins) as Chief Rabbi of Yemen.
