= Eduard Glaser =

19th-century German orientalist

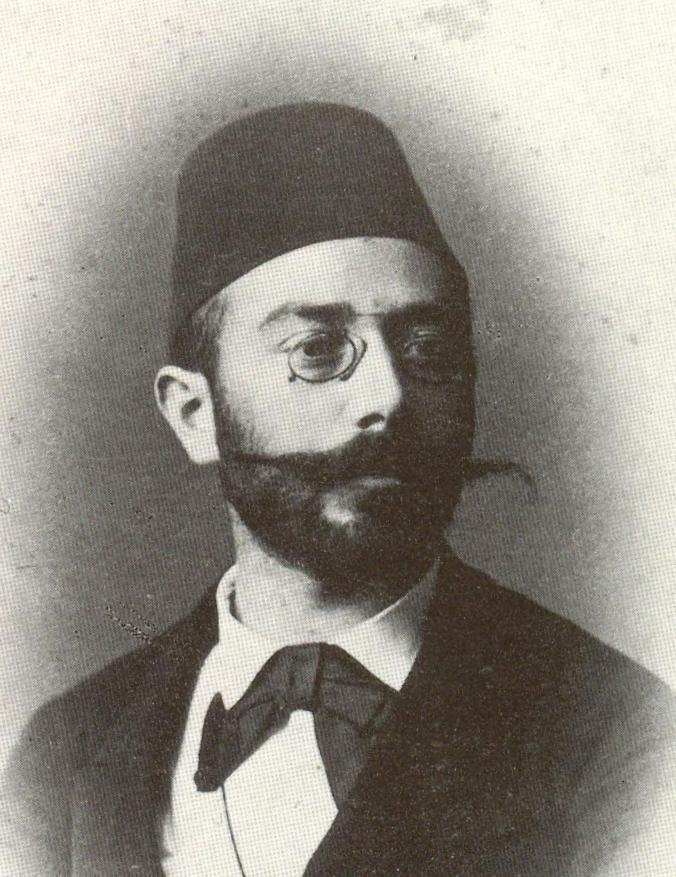
Eduard Glaser.

Eduard Glaser (15 March 1855 – 7 May 1908) was an Austrian Arabist and archaeologist. He was one of the first Europeans to explore South Arabia. He collected thousands of inscriptions in Yemen that are today held by the Kunsthistorisches Museum in Vienna, Austria.

Of the travellers to the Orient in the 19th century, Eduard Glaser is considered the most important scholar to have studied Yemen. He contributed to the advancement of historical and cultural research, revealed its ancient history and documented its written and oral traditions. Yemen fascinated him, incited his imagination, beginning with his first visit to the country (1882-1884). He returned there on three other occasions (1885-1886, 1887-1888, and 1892-1894). In Yemen, Glaser disguised himself as a Muslim with the assumed name of Faqih Hussein bin Abdallah el Biraki Essajah, meaning, "the scholar Hussein bin Abdallah from Prague".

== Background ==
Eduard Glaser was born in the Bohemian village of Deutsch Rust on 15 March 1855, into a Jewish merchant family. He moved to Prague at the age of sixteen. In order to earn his livelihood, he began working as a private tutor in the home of an aristocratic family while, at the same time, he studied mathematics at the Polytechnic in Prague, along with physics, astronomy, geology, geography, geodesy and Arabic which he accomplished in 1875. Certain publications concerning the journeys of Livingstone in Africa in the last quarter of the 19th century inspired within him a similar drive and ambition to set out on a journey in quest of ancient cultures.

In Vienna, Glaser successfully concluded his studies in Arabic and enrolled thereafter in an astronomy class. From 1877 Glaser served as an assistant in the observatory in Vienna for a period of three years. An important turning point in his academic education came in 1880, when Glaser enrolled in a class for the study of Sabaean grammar given by David Heinrich Müller, the founder of South Arabian studies in Austria. Müller suggested to him that he travel to Yemen, offering him a stipend that was to be provided by the Academy of Sciences of Vienna for the purpose of copying down Sabaean inscriptions. Even though his position in the observatory gave him a sense of financial security, he preferred to resign from that post in 1880 – wishing instead to dedicate the remainder of his life to the study of South Arabia's ancient history (Dostal 1990, p. 17). When it became clear to him that his mission would be delayed on account of technical and personal problems, he resorted to his "French connections". A scholarship from the Académie des Inscriptions et Belles Lettres in Paris enabled him to travel to Yemen in 1882. The condition of his French sponsors was that they would receive the results of his findings, especially the inscriptions that he had been so fortunate to have copied down. On 11 October 1882, he arrived at the port of Hodeida (Yemen).

Since Glaser had to wait for many months in Sana'a before he could receive a permit enabling him to travel in Yemen, the French doubted whether he would ever deliver the promised inscriptions, and, so, eventually, they cut off their financial support to him in 1883. During this most troubling time, he wrote to Kaiser Franz Josef I, describing the importance of his mission and mentioning his financial hardships. The Kaiser allotted him out of his own personal fund the humble sum of 800 dollars. Despite such a gift, Glaser was compelled to shorten his stay in Yemen.

== Life and work ==
From 1895 until his death, Glaser lived in Munich. He dedicated most of his time preparing his scientific material for publication. The Turkish government was interested in Glaser's comments on Arabia, even many years after he had left the region, while in 1907 Glaser was asked by the museum in Constantinople to help in cataloguing their collection of Sabaean inscriptions.

After his death Müller made sure that a great portion of Glaser's scientific legacy would be purchased by the Academy of Sciences in Vienna (Akademie der Wissenschaften). The collection is known by the name of Der Corpus Glaserianum or Sammlung Eduard Glaser (SEG), 1944–1961. A small portion of Eduard Glaser's manuscript collection was purchased by Dropsie College in Philadelphia in 1923 (later becoming part of the archives of the Herbert D. Katz Center for Advanced Judaic Studies at the University of Pennsylvania). The legacy left by Glaser from Yemen alone amounts to some 990 copies and imprints ("squeeze" copying method, in which a paper-mâché impression is used in making copies of bas-relief) of Sabaean inscriptions, 17 volumes of diaries and 24 manuscripts. The Sabaean inscriptions were deciphered by Hayyim Habshush for Glaser, which the former had transliterated in the Hebrew-Assyrian script for easy comprehension. Emperor Wilhelm I purchased Glaser's manuscripts for the Prussian library in Berlin. The stones with the Sabaean inscriptions and the sculptures were a donation by the publisher Rudolph Mosse. Glaser's collections contributed much in preserving Vienna's reputation as fore-runner in the study of South Arabia. In 1922 in Vienna, the German-Czech scholar Adolf Grohmann published a comprehensive work entitled Südarabien als Wirtschaftsgebiet (South Arabia as an economic area), in which he draws principally from the comments left by Eduard Glaser during his tours in South Arabia.

== Education ==
In addition to his knowledge of Latin, Greek and most of the major European languages, Glaser showed himself proficient in both classical and colloquial Arabic, and knew also many of its dialects. His natural inquisitiveness led him to analyse the historical processes and relevant cultural influences, eventually giving him the tools needed to investigate Yemen – a land that he saw as the ideal place for finding basic similarities between the rites of the indigenous peoples and those of the ancient Israelites. He also hoped to identify the geographical names mentioned in the Bible. Glaser was an expert in the Sabaean scripts. Furthermore, his knowledge of Abyssinian history and its language propelled him to examine the connexions between Abyssinia (present-day Ethiopia) and Yemen in ancient times. Glaser's profound interest in the political and commercial ties of peoples stretching from Mesopotamia to the Indian Ocean gave him a sense of identifying with past civilisations; a feeling of shared affinity.

== Journey to Yemen ==
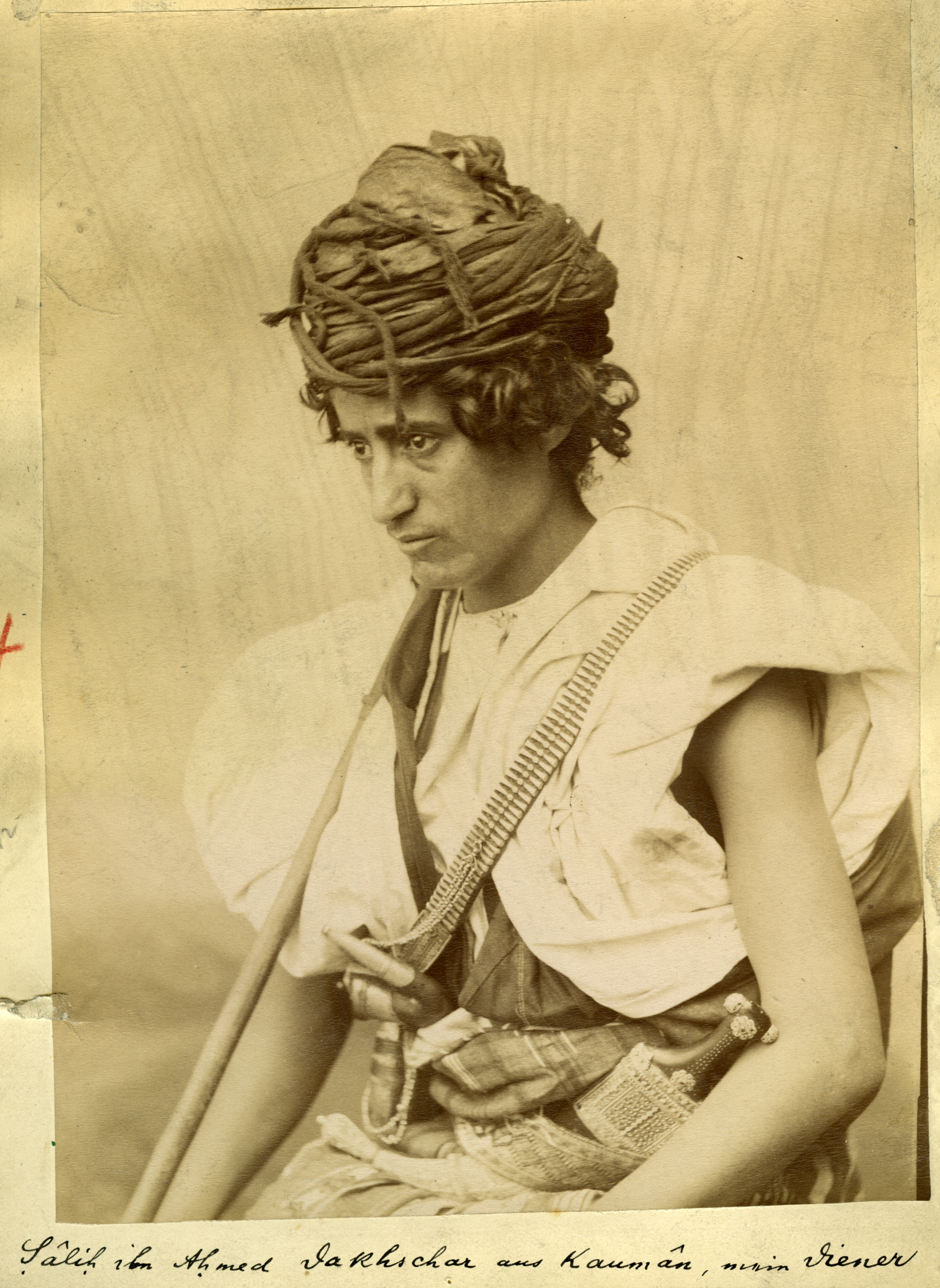
Sâliḥ ibn Aḥmed was a Yemeni who served Glaser during his Journey to Yemen

Glaser's tenure in Yemen was marked by Ottoman occupation, a period plagued also by wars between the invading Turkish army and the forces of Imam al-Mansur Muhammad b. Yahya Hamid a-Din (died in 1894) and his son, Yahya Hamid a-Din (assassinated 1948).

Glaser was personally acquainted with five Turkish governors of Yemen. He advised the Turks to encourage research into the Marib area (ancient Sheba), to show thereby that the Sultan was interested in contributing to the scientific research of Yemen. He proposed to reconstruct a dam at Marib with the aim of increasing the number of inhabitants in the east, as also the intent of strengthening the Sublime Porte's presence in Yemen. Both sides benefited from his closeness to the military and administrative power in the Ottoman controlled regions. Disguised as a Turkish official, Glaser accompanied the governor Yazeed Pasha in his battles in the districts of Hashid and Arhab. Yazeed Pasha supported Glaser, both in his procurement of supplies and equipment, as well as with financial aid. Their relationship was a give-and-take relationship. With the assistance of the Turkish army, he could realize his scientific plans and endeavours. He was able to travel throughout many inaccessible areas which were restricted unto foreigners and, thereby, he was able to copy down hundreds of inscriptions, both, in Sabaic and in Arabic.

Although Glaser viewed positively the reforms that were initiated by the Turks, touching upon almost every aspect of daily life in Yemen, including the lessening of restrictions formerly placed upon the Jews, he expressed more than once in his diary a certain criticism of the Turkish army and their arrogance in dealing with the Yemenite population.

Unlike Joseph Halévy, who concentrated only on the country's glorious past, Glaser observed and documented everything he saw in Yemen. He carried out research on the topography, the geology and geography, prepared cartographic maps, took astronomical notes and collected data on meteorology, climate and economic trade, as well as on the nation's crafts. He collected information on Yemen's current social and political structure, analysed the origin of power of the tribal leadership, the relationship between certain tribes and the Turkish government or between the tribes and the Imam. Moreover, he studied and analysed the different judicial methods practised by the tribes, the Imam and that of the Ottomans in Yemen.

Glaser's friendly relationship with the local governor, Hussein of Marib, helped him to make the research in the area of Marib. Glaser was the first to teach Yemenite natives the Sabaean script. While touring the area with the sons of the local governor, he discovered nearly one hundred Qatabanian inscriptions. His topographic-geographic description of the route to Marib is regarded unto this day as his most important contribution.

== Second Journey to Yemen ==
During his second journey to Yemen, he developed a new strategy. He proposed to give to the museums and archives certain items from his collections of manuscripts, diaries and imprints of the Sabaean inscriptions, including his ethnographic material, in order to "pay back" the investment and expenditures of his last trip, as also to generate funds for his future journey to Yemen. Glaser's collections enriched European archives and museums in London, Paris, Berlin and Vienna. The compensation, however, did not amount to much. Although it had covered his expenses, what money remained was not sufficient to finance his future travels. Despite these difficulties, he regarded his research a sacred mission that had to be continued.

== Third Journey to Yemen ==
Upon his return from his third trip to Yemen in 1889, Glaser suggested to the Foreign Ministry of Austria to either occupy or buy from the Ottoman Turks a place which he identified as being the biblical site of Ophir, in order to make it an Austrian colony (for the same reason Admiral Wilhelm von Tegetthoff had made a similar proposal twenty years earlier to acquire Socotra.

== Legacy ==
Already during his lifetime, Glaser was recognised as a great explorer of South Arabia, and, especially, as a collector and decoder of Sabaean inscriptions. In 1887 he sold a number of South Arabian inscriptions to the British Museum, and the Musée du Louvre also has some of his acquisitions. Yet, in spite of his skills in Arabic, his vast knowledge of Sabaean script and the great treasure-trove of inscriptions that he brought to Europe, including the manuscripts and the ethnographic material that he amassed, as also the data on the field-research he conducted in Yemen, a suitable academic position was denied him and he remained an outsider in the academic circles of Austria, Germany and France. It was not surprising, therefore, that he was brought to deprivation of all basic needs as a result of that isolation, and was forced to find support by his brothers, sisters-in-law and friends.

At the present time only about half of Glaser's inscriptions have been published, and only a small portion of his diaries (now at the National Library in Vienna) and his scientific findings have been studied. Presumably, one of the reasons for this delay is that they were written in short-hand. An account of Glaser's trip to Marib was published by D.H. Müller and Rodokanakis. Maria Höfner (Graz and Tübingen), began to study and publish Glaser's inscriptions in 1944. W. Dostal (University of Vienna) studied and published Glaser's ethnographic data taken from his diaries. Dostal also published sections on Glaser's trip to Hashid and Arhab. Glaser's journey to Marib was published a second time by Dostal, after Adolph Grohmann decoded the script. In the 1960s, Glaser's astronomical notes were published by Andre Gingrich (University of Vienna). Höfner and Dostal, who promoted the publication of Glaser's works and findings, contributed to a renewed interest in the study of South Arabia and Sabaean language studies at European universities. From 1961 to 1981, the Austrian Academy of Science published 14 volumes from Glaser's collection. Unto this very day, many scholars are still busy working on Glaser's collection, and deciphering the inscriptions that he copied down.

The University of Greifswald awarded Glaser in 1890 with the title of honorary doctor, and his name was included in the lexicon of German scientists. Glaser was also honoured as a member of the Academy of Geographical Sciences in Munich. He was also honoured with a Royal Turkish (mejidi) medal.

== Death ==
Glaser suffered from heart ailments and respiratory problems, until he died in Munich on 7 May 1908 of an asthma attack; he is buried in that city’s Old Jewish Cemetery (Alter Jüdischer Friedhof). his eulogists at his funeral were the professors, Fritz Hommel and Siegfried Lichtenstädter. Hommel's eulogy was: "Oh scientists, your knight has fallen! The one who regarded science as a sacred goal has fallen! He was the noble, the hero amongst scholars! In the science book of Munich, his name would be markedly missing!" Prof. Lichtenstädter's eulogy over Glaser's grave contained the words: "The greatest and the best [man] of all has left us". His tombstone was inscribed in Musnad with the name "Husayn bin Abd Allah", which is the name he used when he was in Yemen.

== Selected publications ==
- Glaser, Eduard (1884). "Meine Reise durch Arḥab und Hâschid". Petermann's Mitteilungen (in German). 30: 170–183, 204–213.
- Glaser, Eduard (1886). "Von Ḥodeida nach Ṣan'â vom 24. April bis 1. Mai 1885. Aus dem Tagebuch des Forschungsreisenden Eduard Glaser". Petermann's Mitteilungen (in German). 32: 1–10, 33–48.
- Glaser, Eduard (1895). Die Abessinier in Arabien und Afrika, auf Grund neüntdeckter Inschriften (in German). München: H. Lukaschik. OCLC 6885795.
- Glaser, Eduard (1897). Zwei inschriften über den Dammbruch von Mârib. Ein Beitrag zur geschichte Arabiens im 5. u. 6. Jahrhundert n. Chr (in German). Berlin: W. Peiser. OCLC 22423304.
- Glaser, Eduard (1897). "Der Damm von Mârib". Österreichische Monatsschrift für den Orient (in German). 23 (11): 126–128.
- Glaser, Eduard (1899). Punt und die südarabischen Reiche (in German). Berlin: W. Peiser. OCLC 22414260.
- Glaser, Eduard (1905). Suwâʿ und al-ʿUzzâ und die altjemenischen Inschriften (in German). München: Lukaschik in Komm. OCLC 42936456.
- Glaser, Eduard (1913). Müller, David Heinrich; Rhodokanakis, Nikolaus (eds.). Eduard Glasers Reise nach Mârib (in German). Wien: A. Hölder. OCLC 6885116.

== Sources ==
- Dostal, Walter (1990). Eduard Glaser: Forschungen im Yemen: Eine quellenkritische Untersuchung in ethnologischer Sicht (in German). Wien: Verlag der Österreichischen Akademie der Wissenschaften. ISBN 978-370011746-9.
- Janata, Alfred, ed. (1989). Jemen : im Land der Königin von Saba; Museum für Völkerkunde Wien 16.12.1989 - 10.6.1990; eine Ausstellung des Bundesministeriums für Wissenschaft und Forschung (in German). Wien: Museum für Völkerkunde Wien. OCLC 27397691.
- Lichtenstädter, Siegfried (1909). "Eduard Glaser". Jahrbuch für jüdische Geschichte und Literatur (in German). 12 (1): 135–179.
- Maigret, Alessandro de (2002). Arabia Felix : an exploration of the archaeological history of Yemen. translated by Rebecca Thompson. London: Stacey International. ISBN 1-900988-07-0.
