= Yemenite Jews =

Jewish ethnic group

Hebrew: יְהוּדִי תֵּימָן اليهود اليمنيون
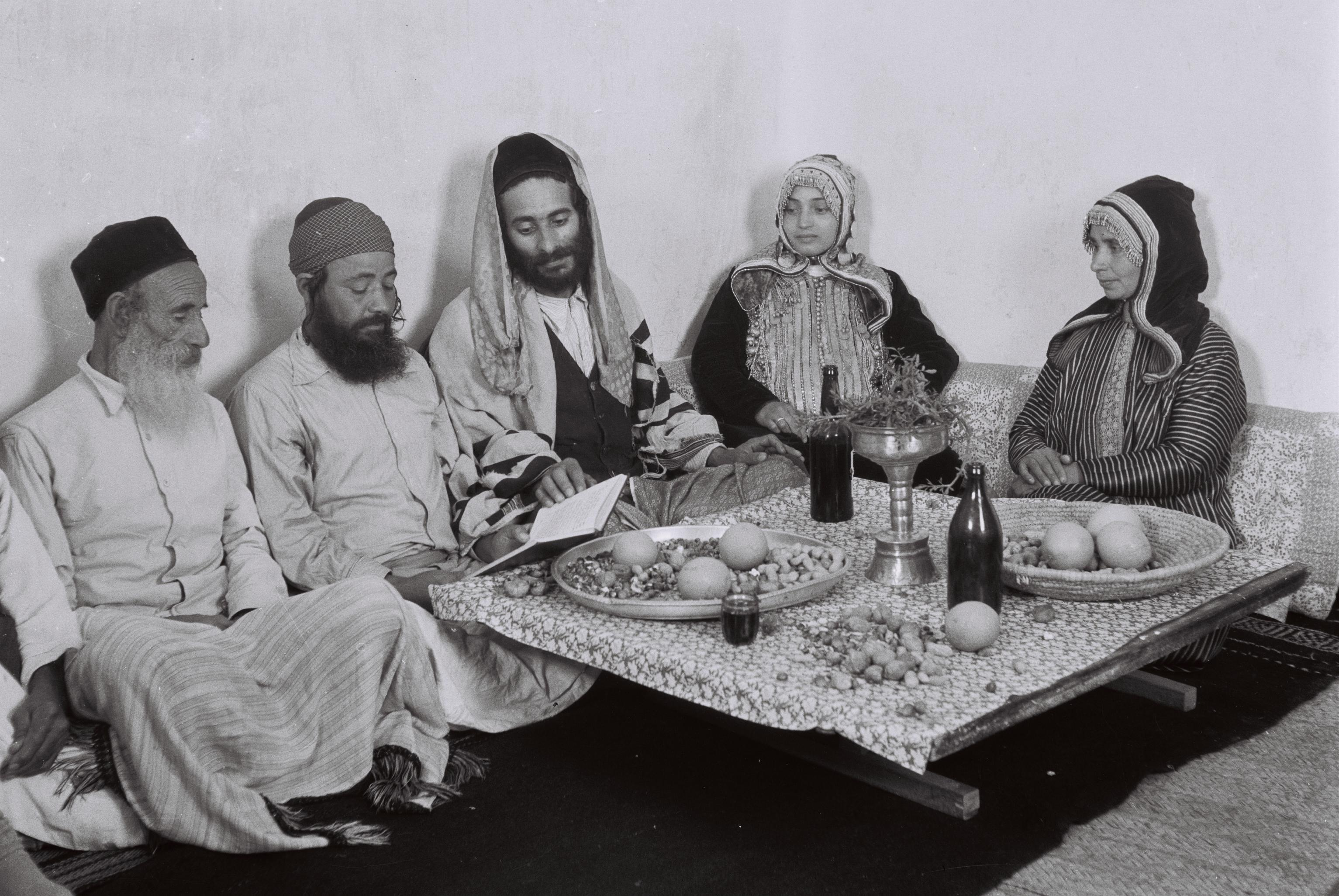
- Yemenite family reading from the Psalms

Total population
- 515,444

Regions with significant populations
- Israel: 435,000
- United States: 80,000
- United Kingdom: 396
- United Arab Emirates: 42
- Bahrain: 5
- Yemen: 1 or 5

Languages
- Modern Hebrew, Judeo-Yemeni Arabic, Yemenite Hebrew

Religion
- Judaism

Related ethnic groups
- Mizrahi Jews, Jewish ethnic divisions, Yemenis, and Samaritans

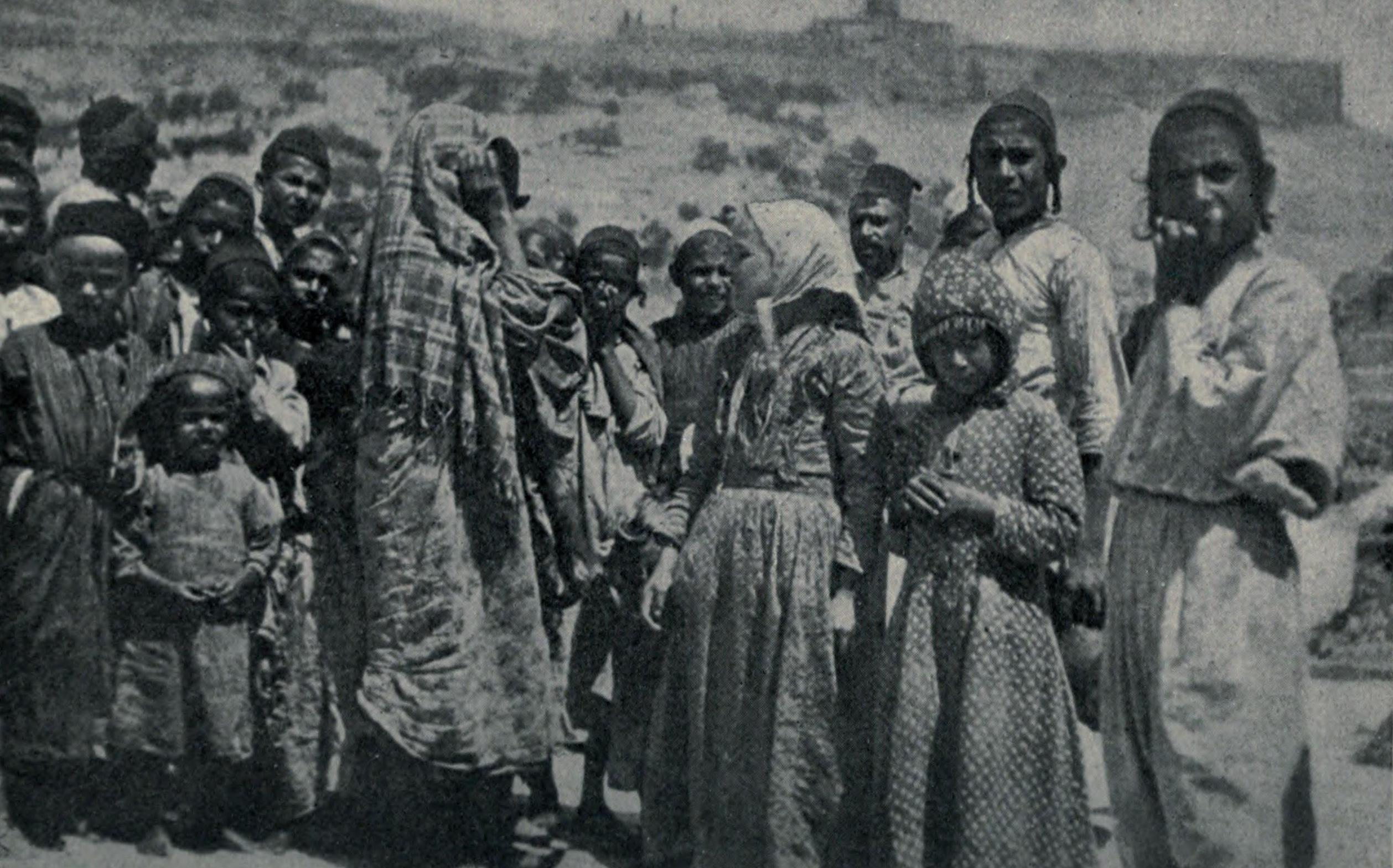
Temani Jews in Jerusalem

Yemenite Jews, also known as Yemeni Jews or Temanim (Hebrew: יְהוּדִי תֵּימָן, romanized: Yehudei Teman; Arabic: اليهود اليمنيون, romanized: al-yahūd al-yamaniyyūn), are a Jewish diaspora group who live or once lived in Yemen and their descendants who maintain their customs. After several waves of persecution, the vast majority of Yemenite Jews emigrated to Israel in Operation Magic Carpet between June 1949 and September 1950. Most Yemenite Jews now live in Israel, with smaller communities in the United States and elsewhere. As of 2024, reputedly only one Jew, Levi Marhabi, remains in Yemen. However, Ynet cited local sources stating that the actual number is five.

Yemenite Jews observe a unique religious tradition that distinguishes them from Ashkenazi Jews, Sephardic Jews, and other Jewish groups. They have been described as "the most Jewish of all Jews" and "the ones who have preserved the Hebrew language the best". Yemeni Jews are considered Mizrahi or "Eastern" Jews. However, they differ from other Mizrahis, who have undergone a process of total or partial assimilation to Sephardic law and customs. While the Shami Yemeni Jews did adopt a Sephardic-influenced rite, this was primarily due to it being forced upon them, (Note: Rabbi Shalom ben Aharon Ha-Kohen Iraqi would go to a different Yemenite synagogue each Shabbat with printed Sephardic siddurim, requesting that the congregation pray in the Sefardic nusach and forcing it upon them if necessary (Yosef Kapach, Passover Aggadta, p. 11). See also Baladi-rite Prayer.) and did not reflect a demographic or general cultural shift among the vast majority of Yemenite Jews.

== History ==
=== Ancient history ===
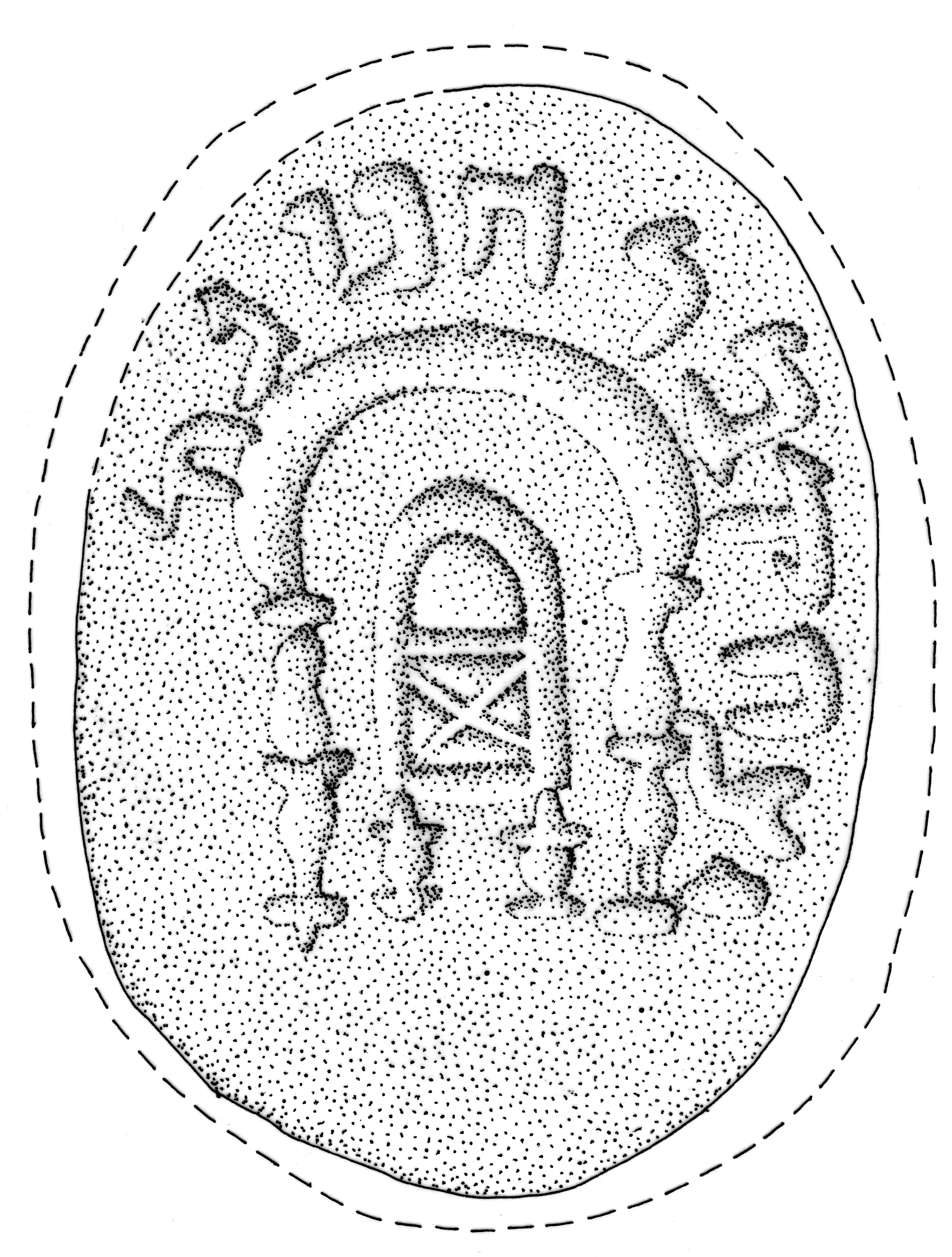
Ring-stone of Yishak bar Hanina with a Torah shrine, 330 BCE – 200 CE, found in Dhofar

Records referring to Judaism in Yemen started to appear in Himyar, a polity established in what is now Yemen in 110 BCE. Various inscriptions in the Ancient South Arabian script in the 2nd century refer to the construction of synagogues approved by Himyarite kings.

In the aftermath of the Bar Kokhba revolt in 132 CE, there was significant Jewish emigration from Roman Judea to Yemen, which was then famous in the Greco-Roman world for its prosperous trade, particularly in spices. The Christian missionary Theophilos the Indian, who came to Yemen in the mid-fourth century, complained that he had found great numbers of Jews. By 380, Himyarite religious practices had undergone fundamental changes. The inscriptions were no longer addressed to Almaqah or Attar but to a single deity called Rahmanan. Debate among scholars continues as to whether Judaism or Christianity influenced Himyarite monotheism.

Jews became especially numerous and influential in South Arabia, a rich and fertile land of incense and spices and a way station on the incense trade route and the trade routes to Africa, India, and East Asia. Yemeni tribes did not oppose the Jewish presence in their country.

==== Dynastic conversion to Judaism ====
In 390, the Himyarite king Abu Karib led a military campaign northwards and fought the Jews of Yathrib in the Hijaz. When Abu Karib fell ill, two local Jewish scholars, Kaab and Assad, took the opportunity to travel to his camp, where they treated him and persuaded him to lift the siege. The scholars also inspired the king with an interest in Judaism, and he converted in 390, persuading his army to do likewise. With this, the Himyar, "the dominant power on the Arabian peninsula", was converted to Judaism. In Yemen, several inscriptions dating back to the 4th and 5th centuries have been found in Hebrew and Sabaean praising the ruling house in Jewish terms for "helping and empowering the People of Israel".

==== Dhu Nuwas and intercommunal unrest ====
By 516, tribal unrest broke out, and several tribal elites fought for power. One of those elites was Joseph dhu Nuwas or Yūsuf Asʾar Yathʾar as mentioned in Ancient South Arabian inscriptions. The actual story of Joseph is murky. Greek and Ethiopian accounts portray him as a Jewish zealot. Some scholars suggest that he was a convert to Judaism. Church of the East accounts claim that his mother was a Jew taken captive from Nisibis and bought by a king in Yemen, whose ancestors had formerly converted to Judaism. Syriac and Byzantine sources maintain that Yūsuf Asʾar sought to convert other Yemenis but they refused to renounce Christianity. The actual picture, however, remains unclear.

In 2009, a BBC broadcast defended a claim that Yūsuf Asʾar offered villagers the choice between conversion to Judaism or death and then massacred 20,000 Christians. The program's producers stated, "The production team spoke to many historians over 18 months, among them Nigel Groom, who was our consultant, and Professor Abdul Rahman Al-Ansary [former professor of archaeology at the King Saud University in Riyadh]." Inscriptions attributed to Yūsuf Asʾar himself show the great pride he expressed after killing more than 22,000 Christians in Ẓafār and Najran. According to Jamme, Sabaean inscriptions reveal that the combined war booty (excluding deaths) from campaigns waged against the Abyssinians in Ẓafār, the fighters in 'Ašʻarān, Rakbān, Farasān, Muḥwān (Mokha), and the fighters and military units in Najran, amounted to 12,500 war trophies, 11,000 captives and 290,000 camels and bovines and sheep.

Historian Glen Bowersock described this as a "savage pogrom that the Jewish king of the Arabs launched against the Christians in the city of Najran. The king himself reported in excruciating detail to his Arab and Persian allies about the massacres he had inflicted on all Christians who refused to convert to Judaism." There were also reports of massacres and destruction of places of worship by Christians, too. Francis Edward Peters wrote that while there is no doubt that this was a religious persecution, it is equally clear that a political struggle was going on as well.

According to 'Irfan Shahid's Martyrs of Najran – New Documents, Dhu-Nuwas sent an army of some 120,000 soldiers to lay siege to the city of Najran, which lasted for six months, with the city finally taken and burnt on the 15th day of the seventh month (i.e., the lunar month of Tishri). The city had revolted against the king and they refused to deliver it up unto the king. About three hundred of the city's inhabitants surrendered to the king's forces, under the assurances of an oath that no harm would come to them, and these were later bound, while those remaining in the city were burnt alive within their church. The death toll in this account is said to have reached about two thousand. However, in the Sabaean inscriptions describing these events, it is reported that by the month Dhu-Madra'an (between July and September) there were "1000 killed, 1500 prisoners [taken] and 10,000 head of cattle."

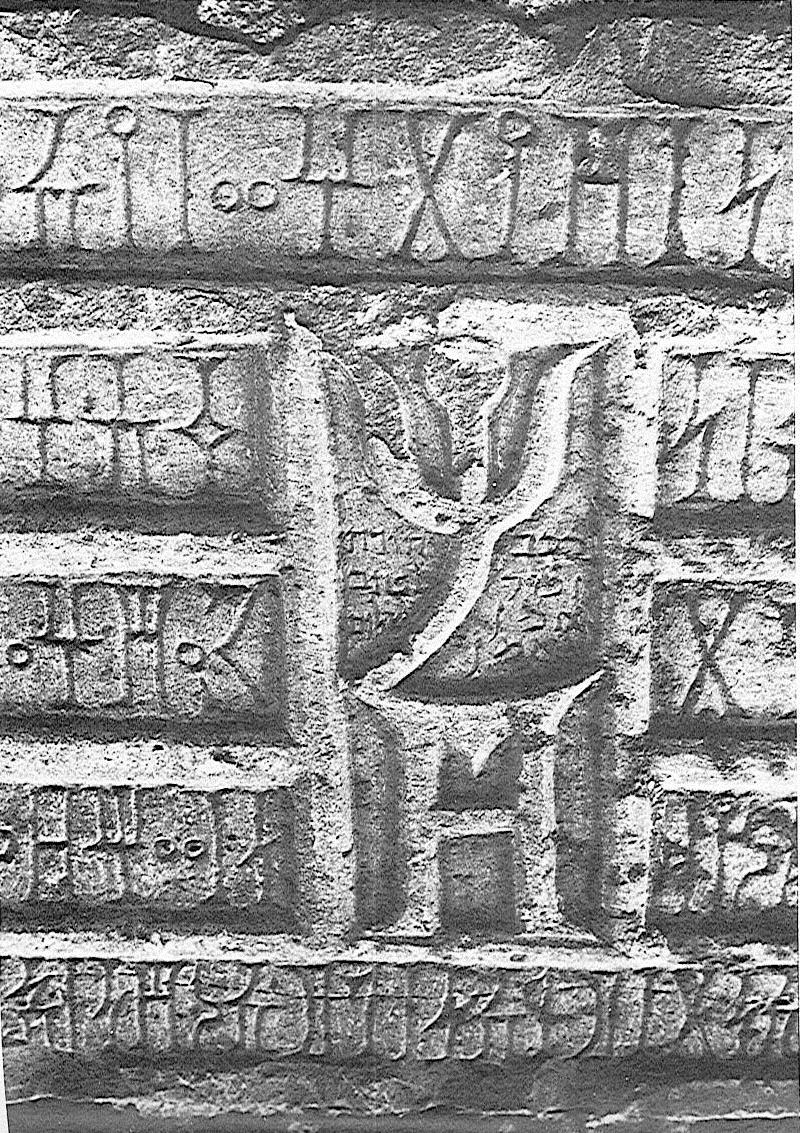
Sabaean Inscription with Hebrew writing: "The writing of Judah, of blessed memory, Amen shalom amen"

There are two dates mentioned in the "letter of Simeon of Beit Aršam." One date indicates the letter was written in Tammuz in the year 830 of Alexander (518/519 CE), from the camp of GBALA (Jebala), king of the 'SNYA (Ghassanids or the Ġassān clan). In it, he tells of the events that transpired in Najran, while the other date puts the letter's composition in the year 835 of Alexander (523/524 CE). The second letter, however, is actually a Syriac copy of the original, copied in the year 1490 of the Seleucid Era (= 1178/79 CE). Today, it is largely agreed that the latter date is the accurate one, as it is confirmed by the Martyrium Arethae, as well as by epigraphic records, namely Sabaean inscriptions discovered in the Asir of Saudi Arabia (Bi'r Ḥimā), photographed by J. Ryckmans in Ry 507, 8 ~ 9, and by A. Jamme in Ja 1028, which give the old Sabaean year 633 for these operations (said to correspond with 523 CE).

Procopius, John of Ephesus, and other contemporary historians recount Kaleb's invasion of Yemen around 520, against the Himyarite king Yūsuf Asʾar Yathʾar, known as Dhu Nuwas, a Jewish convert who was persecuting the Christian community of Najran. After much fighting, Kaleb's soldiers eventually routed Yusuf's forces. They killed the king, allowing Kaleb to appoint Sumyafa Ashwa, a native Christian (named Esimiphaios by Procopius), as his viceroy of Himyar.

Aksumite control of Arabia Felix continued until c. 525, when Sumyafa Ashwa was deposed by the Abyssinian General Abraha, who made himself king. Procopius states that Kaleb made several unsuccessful attempts to recover his overseas territory; however, his successor later negotiated a peace with Abraha, where Abraha acknowledged the Axumite king's authority and paid tribute. Stuart Munro-Hay opines that by this expedition Axum overextended itself, and this final intervention across the Red Sea, "was Aksum's swan-song as a great power in the region."

==== Tradition ====
There are numerous accounts and traditions concerning the arrival of Jews in various regions in Southern Arabia. One tradition suggests that King Solomon sent Jewish merchant marines to Yemen to prospect for gold and silver with which to adorn his Temple in Jerusalem. In 1881, the French vice consulate in Yemen wrote to the leaders of the Alliance (the Alliance Israelite Universelle) in France, that he read in a book by the Arab historian Abu-Alfada that the Jews of Yemen settled in the area in 1451 BCE.

Another legend says that Yemeni tribes converted to Judaism after the Queen of Sheba's visit to King Solomon. The Sanaite Jews have a tradition that their ancestors settled in Yemen 42 years before the destruction of the First Temple. It is said that under the prophet Jeremiah some 75,000 Jews, including priests and Levites, traveled to Yemen.

Another legend states that when Ezra commanded the Jews to return to Jerusalem they disobeyed, whereupon he pronounced a ban upon them. According to this legend, as a punishment for this hasty action, Ezra was denied burial in Israel. As a result of this local tradition, which cannot be validated historically, it is said that no Jew of Yemen gives the name of Ezra to a child, although all other Biblical appellatives are used. The Yemenite Jews claim that Ezra cursed them to be a poor people for not heeding his call. This seems to have come true in the eyes of some Yemenites, as Yemen is extremely poor. However, some Yemenite sages in Israel today emphatically reject this story as myth, if not outright blasphemy.

Because of Yemenite Jewry's cultural affiliation with Babylon, historian Yehuda Ratzaby opines that the Jews of Yemen migrated to Yemen from places in Babylonia. According to local legends, the kingdom's aristocracy converted to Judaism in the 6th century CE.

=== Middle Ages ===
==== Jewish–Muslim relations in Yemen ====
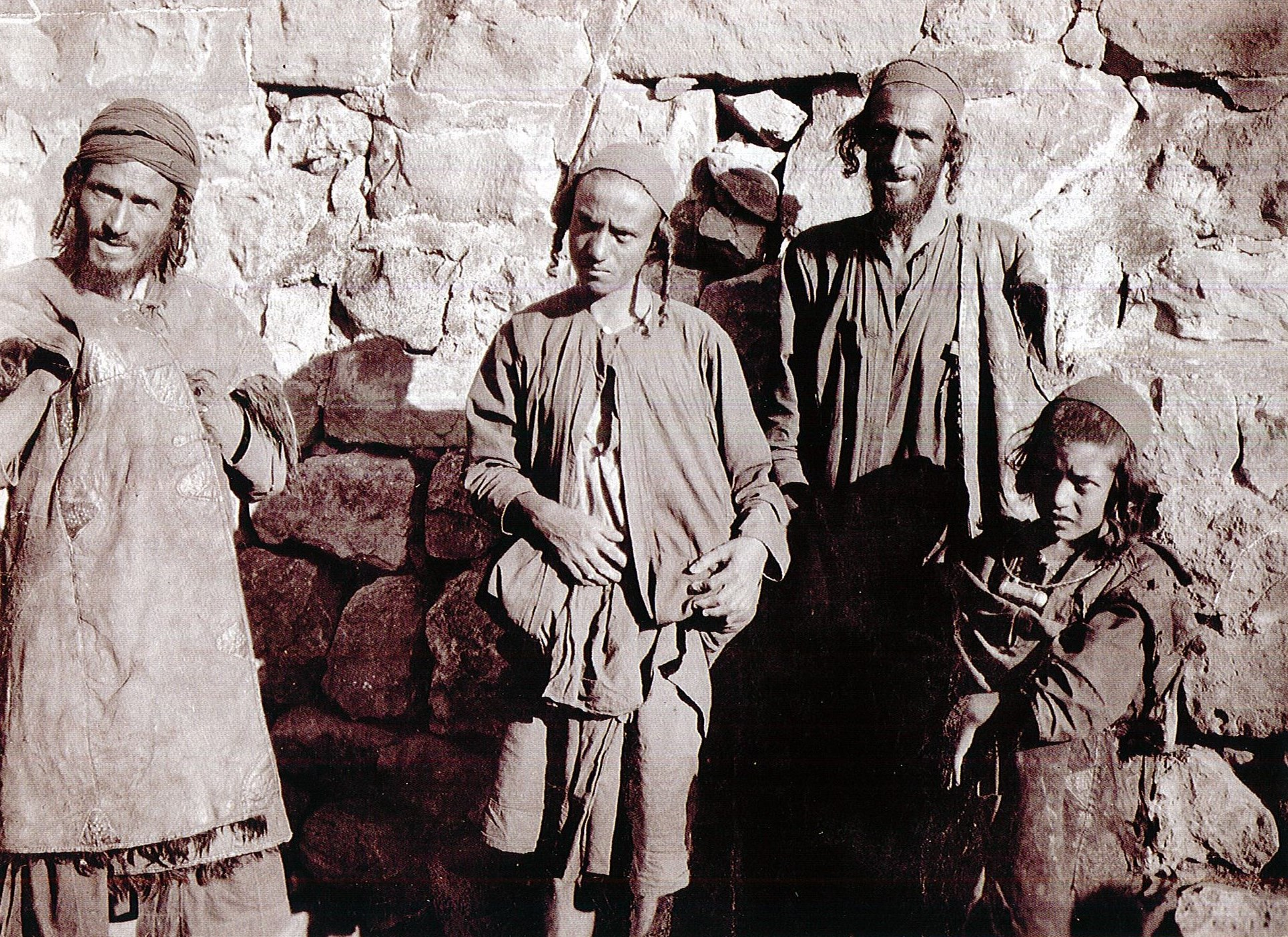
Jews of Maswar, Yemen, in 1902

As People of the Book, Jews were assured freedom of religion in exchange for payment of the jizya or poll tax, which was imposed on non-Muslim monotheists. Feudal overlords imposed this annual tax upon Jews, which, under Islamic law, was to ensure their status as protected persons of the state. This tax (tribute) was assessed against every male thirteen years and older and its remittance varied between the wealthy and the poor. In the early 20th century, this amounted to one Maria Theresa thaler (riyal) for a poor man, two thalers in specie for the middle classes, and four or more thalers for the rich. Upon payment, Jews were also exempt from paying the zakat which must be paid by Muslims once their residual wealth reaches a certain threshold.

Active persecution of Jews did not gain full force until a Zaydi clan seized power from the more tolerant Sunni Muslims, early in the 10th century. The legal status of Jews in Yemen started to deteriorate around the time the Tahirids took Sanaa from Zaidis, mainly because of new discrimination established by the Muslim rulers. Such laws were not included in Zaidi legal writings till comparatively late with Kitab al-Azhar of al-Mahdi Ahmad bin Yahya in the first half of the 15th century. This also led to deterioration of the economic and social situation of Jews.

Jewish intellectuals wrote in both Hebrew and Arabic and engaged in the same literary endeavours as the Muslim majority. According to a late-9th-century document, the first Zaydi imam al-Hadi ila'l-Haqq Yahya had imposed limitations and a special tax on land held by Jews and Christians of Najran. In the mid-11th century, Jews from several communities in the Yemen highlands, including Sanaʿa, appear to have been attracted to the Sulayhids' capital of Dhu Jibla. The city was founded by Abdullah bin Muhammad al-Sulaihi in the mid-11th century, and according to Tarikh al-Yamman of the famed Yemenite author Umara al-Yamani (1121–74), was named after a Jewish pottery merchant.

During the 12th century, Aden was first ruled by the Fatimid Caliphate and then the Ayyubids. The city formed a great emporium on the sea route to India. Documents of the Cairo Geniza about Aden reflect a thriving Jewish community led by the prominent Bundar family. Abu Ali Hasan ibn Bundar served as the head of the Jewish communities in Yemen as well as a representative of the merchants in Aden. His son Madmun was the central figure in Yemenite Jewry during the flourishing of trade with India. The Bundar family produced some celebrated negidim who exerted authority over the Jews of Yemen as well as Jewish merchants in India and Ceylon. The community developed communal and spiritual connections in addition to business and family ties with other Jewish communities in the Islamic world. They also developed ties with and funded Jewish centers in Iraq, Palestine, and Egypt. Due to the trade, Jews also emigrated to Aden for mercantile and personal reasons.

Yemenite Jews experienced violent persecution at times. In the late 1160s, the Yemenite ruler 'Abd-al-Nabī ibn Mahdi gave Jews a choice of conversion to Islam or martyrdom. Mahdi also imposed his beliefs upon the Muslims besides the Jews. This led to a revival of Jewish messianism, but also led to mass-conversion. While a popular local Yemenite Jewish preacher called on Jews to choose martyrdom, Maimonides sent what is known as the Epistle to Yemen requesting that they remain faithful to their religion, but if at all possible, not to cast affronts before their antagonists. The persecution ended in 1173 with the defeat of ibn Mahdi and conquest of Yemen by Turan-Shah, the brother of Saladin, and they were allowed to return to their faith.

According to two Genizah documents, the Ayyubid ruler of Yemen al-Malik al-Mu'izz al-Ismail (reigned 1197–1202) attempted to force the Jews of Aden to convert. The second document details the relief of the Jewish community after his murder and those who had been forced to convert reverted to Judaism.

The rule of Shafi'i Rasulids which lasted from 1229 to 1474 brought stability to the region. During this period, Jews enjoyed social and economic prosperity. This changed with the rise of the Tahiri dynasty that ruled until the conquest of Yemen by the Ottoman Empire in 1517. A note written in a Jewish manuscript mentions the destruction of the old synagogue in Sanaa in 1457 under the rule of the dynasty's founder Ahmad 'Amir. An important note of the treatment of Jews by Tahirids is found in the colophon of a Jewish manuscript from Yemen in 1505, when the last Tahirid Sultan took Sanaa from the Zaydis. The document describes one kingdom as exploitive and the other as repressive.

The Jewish communities experienced a messianic episode with the rise of another Messiah claimant in Bayhan District, mentioned by Hayim bin Yahya Habhush in History of the Jews in Yemen written in 1893 and Ba'faqia al-Shihri's Chronicle written in the 16th century. The messiah was acknowledged as a political figure and gathered many people around him into what seemed to be an organized military force. The Tahirid Sultan Amir ibn 'Abd al-Wahhab attacked the messiah, killing many Jews and crushing the movement. He saw it as a violation of the protection agreement and liquidated the Jewish settlement in Hadhramaut as collective punishment. Presumably some of them were killed, many converted to Islam or migrated to Aden and the adjacent mainland of Yemen. It seems, however, that the liquidation was not immediate. Jews of the place are recorded by 1527, but not by the 1660s. After the 15th century, Jewish communities only existed in the Hadhramaut's western periphery. The oppression at the hands of pious Muslim rulers and endangerment of the community because of the plots of a few Jewish messianists are common themes in the history of Yemenite Jews.

==== Maimonides ====
Maimonides (1138–1204), the 12th-century philosopher, scholar and codifier of halakha, was adulated by the Jews of Yemen for his interventions on their behalf during times of religious persecution, heresy, and heavy taxation.

When the writings of Maimonides reached the heads of the community, they continued to address their questions unto him and sent emissaries to purchase several copies of his books, just as he acknowledged. In all the subjects of the Torah, Yemenite Jews customarily base their rule of practice (halakhah) on Maimonides' teachings, and will instruct following his view, whether in lenient or strict rulings, even where most other halakhic authorities disagree. Even so, some ancient customs remained with the Yemenite Jews, especially in those matters committed unto the masses and to the general public, which are still adhered to by them from an ancient period, and which they did not change even though Maimonides ruled otherwise. In common Jewish practice, the Jews of Yemen dissented with Maimonides' rulings in more than 50 places, ten of which places are named explicitly by Yosef Qafih.

=== Early modern period ===
The Zaydi enforced a statute known as the Orphan's Decree, anchored in their own 18th-century legal interpretations and enforced at the end of that century. It obligated the Zaydi state to take under its protection and to educate in Islamic ways any dhimmi (i.e. non-Muslim) child whose parents had died when he was a minor. The Orphan's Decree was ignored during the Ottoman rule (1872–1918), but was renewed during the period of Imam Yahya (1918–1948).

Under the Zaydi rule, the Jews were considered to be impure and therefore forbidden to touch a Muslim or a Muslim's food. They were obligated to humble themselves before a Muslim, to walk to the left side, and greet him first. They could not build houses higher than a Muslim's or ride a camel or horse, and when riding on a mule or a donkey, they had to sit sideways. Upon entering the Muslim quarter a Jew had to take off his foot-gear and walk barefoot. If attacked with stones or fists by youth, a Jew was not allowed to fight them. In such situations, he had the option of fleeing or seeking intervention by a merciful Muslim passerby.

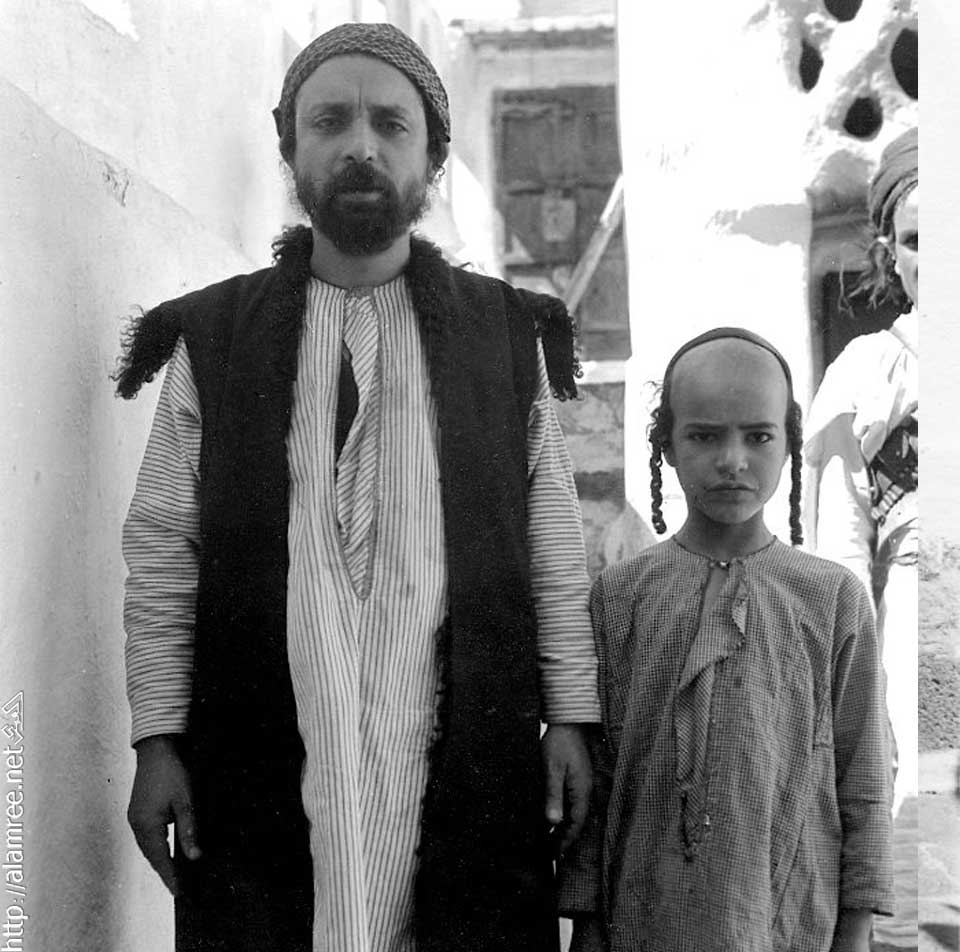
Yemenite silver- and goldsmith and boy in Sanaa (1937)

Ottoman rule ended in 1630, when the Zaydis took over Yemen. Jews were once again persecuted. In 1679, under the rule of Al-Mahdi Ahmad, Jews were expelled en masse from all parts of Yemen to the distant province of Mawza, in what was known as the Mawza Exile, when many Jews died of starvation and disease as a consequence. As many as two-thirds of the exiled Jews did not survive. Their houses and property were seized, and many synagogues were destroyed or converted into mosques.

The Jewish community recovered partly because of Imam Muhammad al-Mahdi, also called "Sahib al-Mawahib", who protected them and allowed them to return to their previous status. He rejected the pleas for Jewish deportation by the clerics and maintained ties with the Jewish 'Iraqi family which was charged with the mint house. From the end of the 17th century, the Jews ran the mint house of the imams. In 1725, Imam Al-Mutawakkil ordered closure of synagogues because of the Jews selling wine to Muslims. However, their closure was rejected by a religious legal ruling that these synagogues were permitted by his predecessors.

The Jews of Yemen had expertise in a wide range of trades normally avoided by Zaydi Muslims. Trades such as silver-smithing, blacksmiths, repairing weapons and tools, weaving, pottery, masonry, carpentry, shoemaking, and tailoring were occupations that were exclusively taken by Jews. The division of labor created a sort of covenant, based on mutual economic and social dependency, between the Zaydi Muslim population and the Jews of Yemen. The Muslims produced and supplied food, and the Jews supplied all manufactured products and services that the Yemeni farmers needed.

The Jewish community headed by Shalom 'Iraqi recovered from this affair and the position of 'Iraqi strengthened under Imam Al-Mansur. The community flourished under him because of the part it played in trade with India through Mokha. The German researcher Carsten Niebuhr who visited Yemen in 1763, reports that two years before he arrived, Shalom 'Iraqi had been imprisoned and fined while twelve out of fourteen synagogues in a village near Sanaa were shut down. 'Iraqi was released two weeks before his arrival. Jewish sources attribute this to a regime change. The Imam Al-Mahdi Abbas was extremely religious and his ideological affinity with the clerics created an atmosphere of extreme repression. He however resisted their pressure on him to expel the Jews. The synagogues were reopened by Ali al-Mansur after payment of a heavy fee.

In the early 18th-century, many Jews in Yemen were employed in some of the most degrading and menial tasks, on behalf of the Arab population, such as cleaning the cess pools and latrines.

=== Late modern period ===
At the beginning of the nineteenth-century, Yemenite Jews lived principally in Sanaa (7,000-plus), with the largest Jewish population and twenty-eight synagogues, followed by Rada'a, with the second-largest Jewish population and nine synagogues, Sa'dah (1,000), Dhamar (1,000), Aden (200), the desert of Beda (2,000), Manakhah (3,000), among others. Almost all resided in the interior of the plateau. Carl Rathjens who visited Yemen in the years 1927 and 1931 puts the total number of Jewish communities in Yemen at 371 settlements. Other significant Jewish communities in Yemen were based in the south central highlands in the cities of: Taiz (the birthplace of one of the most famous Yemenite Jewish spiritual leaders, Mori Salem Al-Shabazzi Mashta), Ba'dan, and other cities and towns in the Shar'ab region. Many other Jewish communities in Yemen were long since abandoned by their Jewish inhabitants. Yemenite Jews were chiefly artisans, including gold-, silver- and blacksmiths in the San'a area, and coffee merchants in the south central highland areas.

In 1912, Zionist emissary Shmuel Yavne'eli came into contact with Habbani Jews, describing them in the following way:

The Jews in these parts are held in high esteem by everyone in Yemen and Aden. They are said to be courageous, always with their weapons and wild long hair, and the names of their towns are mentioned by the Jews of Yemen with great admiration.

==== 19th-century Yemenite messianic movements ====
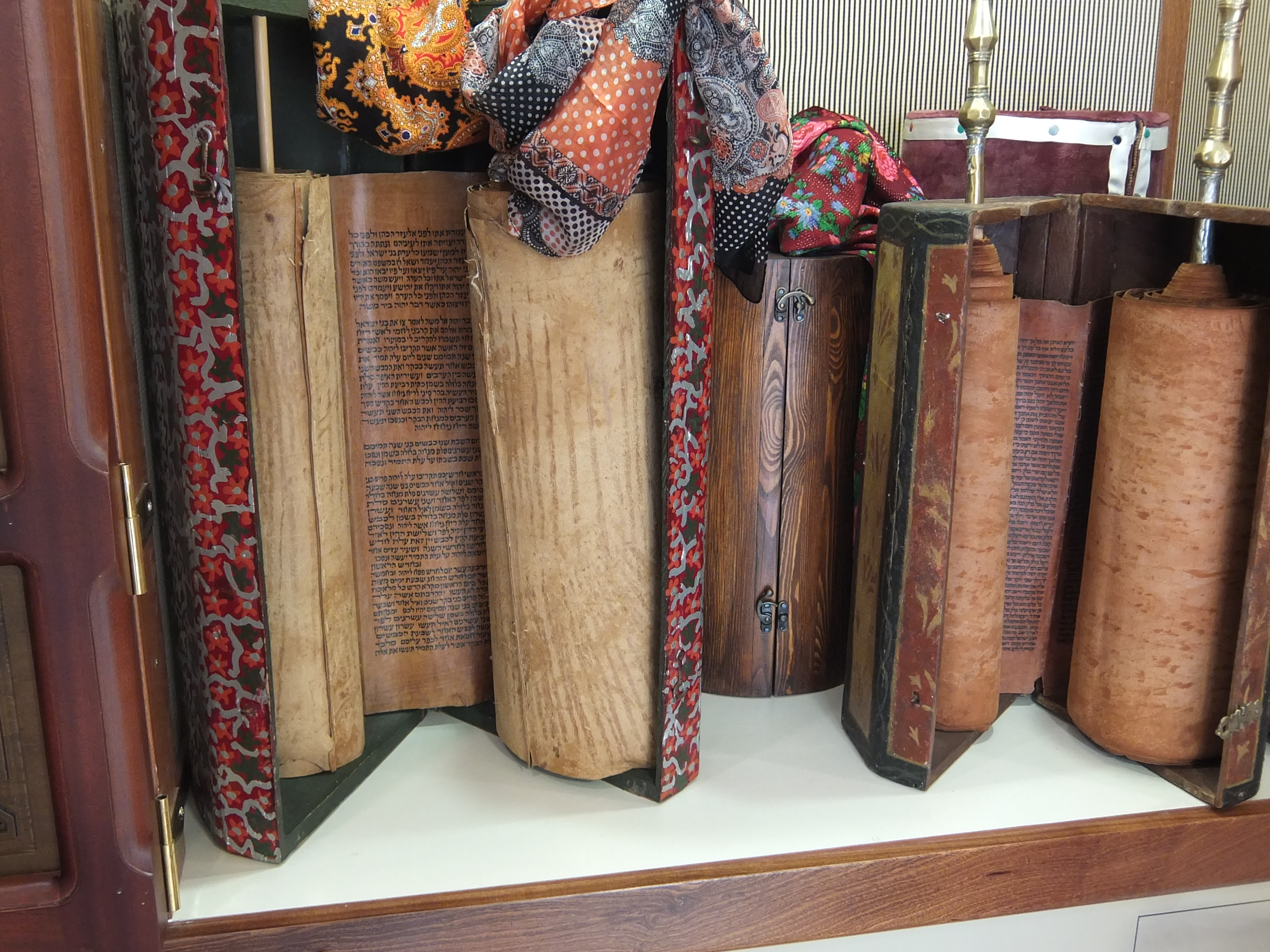
Yemenite Torah scrolls

During this period messianic expectations were very intense among the Jews of Yemen (and among many Arabs as well). The three pseudo-messiahs of this period, and their years of activity, are:

- Shukr Kuhayl I (1861–65)
- Shukr Kuhayl II (1868–75)
- Joseph Abdallah (1888–93)

According to the Jewish traveler Jacob Saphir, the majority of Yemenite Jews during his visit of 1862 entertained a belief in the messianic proclamations of Shukr Kuhayl I. Earlier Yemenite messiah claimants included the anonymous 12th-century messiah who was the subject of Maimonides's famous Iggeret Teman, or Epistle to Yemen, the messiah of Bayhan (c. 1495), and Suleiman Jamal (c. 1667), in what Lenowitz regards as a unified messiah history spanning 600 years.

==== Orphan's decree (Yemen, 1922) ====
In 1922, the government of Yemen, under Yahya Muhammad Hamid ed-Din, re-introduced an ancient Islamic law entitled the "orphans decree". The law dictated that if Jewish boys or girls under the age of 12 were orphaned, they were to be forcibly converted to Islam, their connections to their families and communities were to be severed, and they had to be handed over to Muslim foster families. The rule was based on the law that the prophet Muhammad is "the father of the orphans", and on the fact that the Jews in Yemen were considered "under protection", and the ruler was obligated to care for them. The Jews tried to prevent the conversion of orphans in two main ways, which were by marrying them so the authorities would consider them as adults, or by smuggling them out of the country.

==== Emigration to Israel ====
Map of Jewish communities in Yemen prior to immigration to the British Mandate of Palestine and Israel

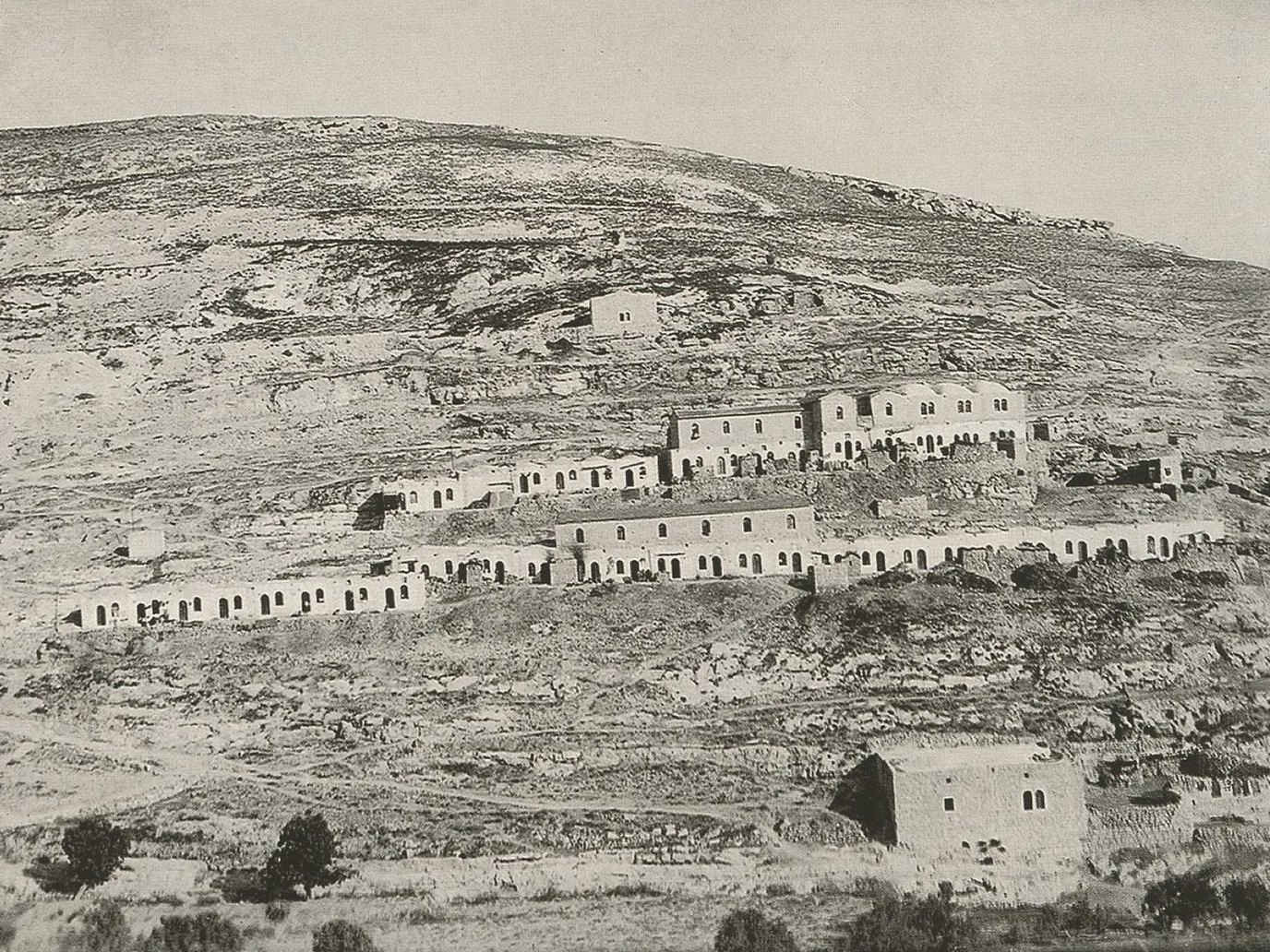
Yemenite-Jewish village south of Silwan, housing project built by a charity in 1891

===== Places of origin and 1881–1939 new communities =====
The three major population centers for Jews in southern Arabia were Aden, Habban, and the Hadhramaut. The Jews of Aden lived in and around the city, and flourished during the British Aden Protectorate.

The vast majority of Yemenite immigrants counted by the authorities of Mandate Palestine in 1939 had settled in the country prior to that date. Throughout the periods of Ottoman Palestine and Mandatory Palestine, Jews from Yemen had settled primarily in agricultural settlements in the country, namely: Petach Tikvah (Machaneh Yehuda), Rishon Lezion (Shivat Zion), Rehovot (Sha'arayim and Marmorek), Wadi Chanin (later called Ness Ziona), Be'er Ya'akov, Hadera (Nachliel), Zichron Yaakov, Yavne'el, Gedera, Ben Shemen, Kinneret, Degania and Milhamia. Others chose to live in the urban areas of Jerusalem (Silwan, and Nachalat Zvi), Jaffa, Tel Aviv (Kerem Hateimanim), and later, Netanya (Shekhunat Zvi).

===== First wave of emigration: 1881 to 1918 =====
Emigration from Yemen to Palestine began in 1881, and continued almost without interruption until 1914. It was during this time that about 10% of the Yemenite Jews left. Due to the changes in the Ottoman Empire, citizens could move more freely, and in 1869, travel was improved with the opening of the Suez Canal, which reduced the travel time from Yemen to Palestine. Certain Yemenite Jews interpreted these changes and the new developments in the "Holy Land" as heavenly signs that the time of redemption was near. By settling in the Holy Land, they would play a part in what they believed could precipitate the anticipated messianic era.

a Yemenite Jew blowing a shofar in Israel, 1947

From 1881 to 1882, some 30 Jewish families left Sanaa and several nearby settlements, and made the long trek by foot and by sea to Jerusalem, where most had settled in Silwan. This wave was followed by other Jews from central Yemen, who continued to move into Palestine until 1914. The majority of these groups would later move into Jerusalem proper and Jaffa. Rabbi Avraham Al-Naddaf, who migrated to Jerusalem in 1891, described in his autobiography the hardships the Yemenite Jewish community faced in their new country, where there were no hostelries to accommodate wayfarers and new immigrants. On the other hand, he writes that the Sephardi kollelim (seminaries) had taken under their auspices the Yemenite Jews from the moment they set foot in Jerusalem. Later, however, the Yemenites would come to feel discriminated against by the Sephardic community, who compelled them to no longer make use of their own soft, pliable matzah, but to buy from them only the hard cracker-like matzah made weeks in advance prior to Passover. He also mentions that the Yemenite community would pay the prescribed tax to the public coffers; yet, they were not being allotted an equal share or subsidy as had been given to the Sephardic Jews. By 1910, the Yemenites had broken away from the Sephardic seminaries.

Before World War I, there was another wave that began in 1906 and continued until 1914. Hundreds of Yemenite Jews made their way to the Holy Land, and chose to settle in the agricultural settlements. It was after these movements that the World Zionist Organization sent Shmuel Yavne'eli to Yemen to encourage Jews to emigrate to Palestine. Yavne'eli reached Yemen at the beginning of 1911, and returned in April 1912. Due to Yavne'eli's efforts, about 1,000 Jews left central and southern Yemen, with several hundred more arriving before 1914. The purpose of this immigration was considered by the Zionist Office as allowing the importation of cheap labour. This wave of Yemenite Jewry underwent extreme suffering, physically and mentally, and those who arrived between 1912 and 1918 had a very high incidence of premature mortality, ranging from between 30% and 40% generally and, in some townships, reaching as high as 50%.

===== Second wave of emigration: 1920 to 1950 =====
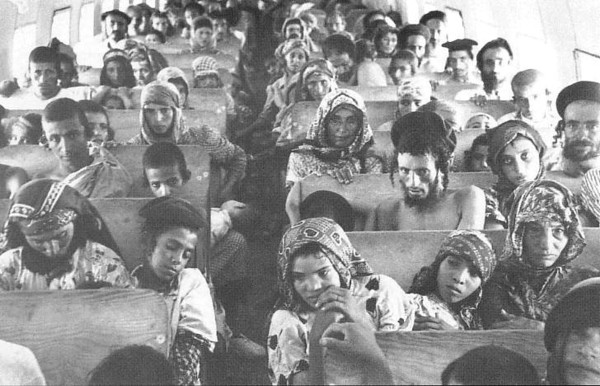
Jewish exodus from Arab and Muslim countries: Yemenite Jews en route from Aden to Israel on "wings of eagles".

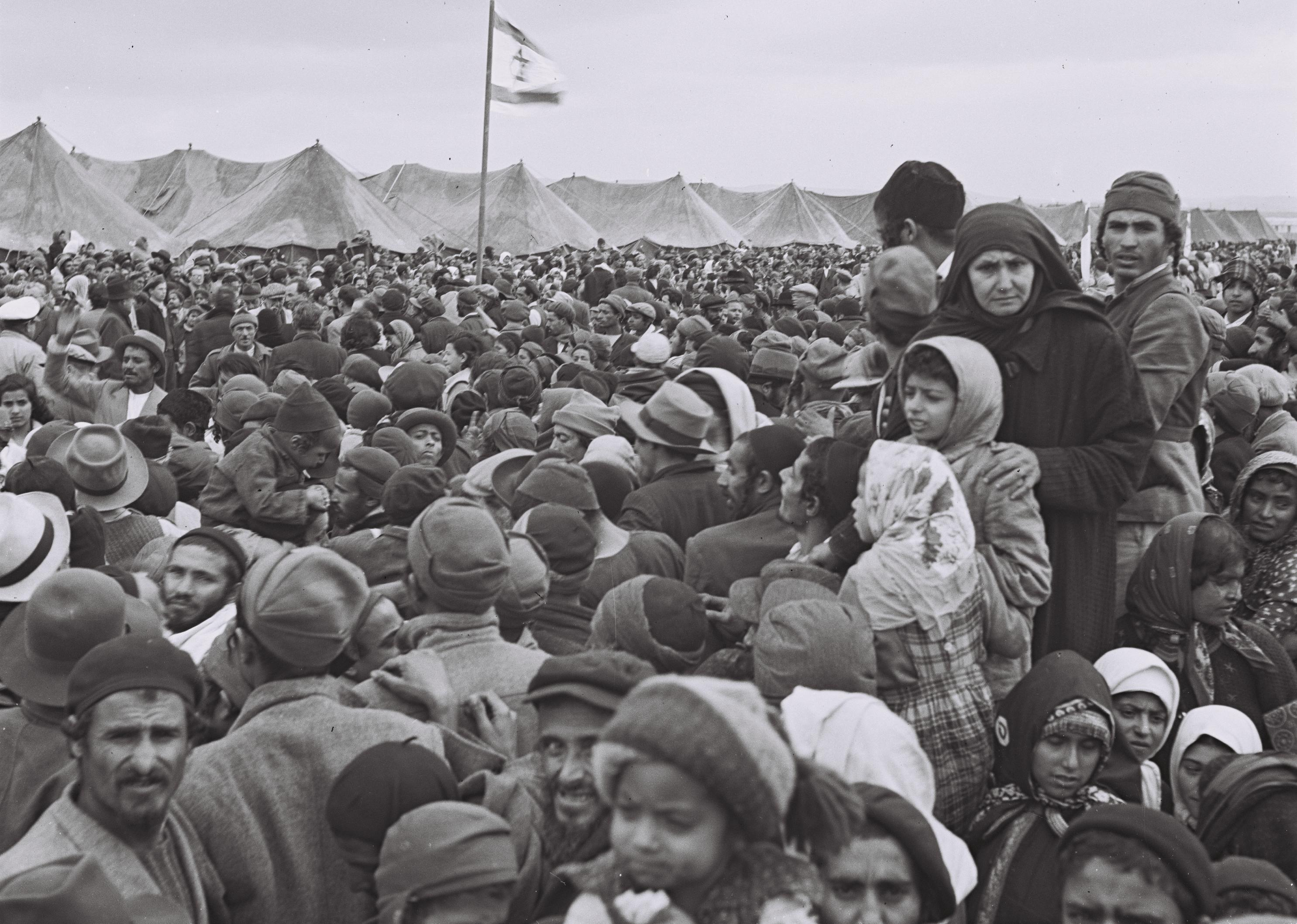
Yemenite Jews at a Tu Bishvat celebration, Ma'abarat Rosh HaAyin, 1950

During the British Mandate of Palestine, the total number of persons registered as immigrants from Yemen, between the years April 1939 – December 1945, was put at 4,554. By 1947, there were an estimated 35,000 Yemenite Jews living in Mandate Palestine. After the UN partition vote on Palestine, Arab rioters, assisted by the local police force, engaged in a pogrom in Aden that killed 82 Jews and destroyed hundreds of Jewish homes. Aden's Jewish community was economically paralyzed, as most of the Jewish stores and businesses were destroyed. Early in 1948, the unfounded rumour of the ritual murder of two girls led to looting.

Following the establishment of the State of Israel in 1948, the messianism which had long been prevalent within the Yemenite community reemerged. David Ben-Gurion leading the new state caused many to believe that this was the "Kingdom of David", while many of the mostly poor Yemenite Jews viewed Israel as an escape from their poverty. Moreover, the Israeli government used significant messianic messaging and language in its attempts to convince Yemenite Jewry to move to Israel.

This increasingly perilous situation led to the emigration of virtually the entire Yemenite Jewish community between June 1949 and September 1950 in Operation Magic Carpet. During this period, over 50,000 Jews migrated to Israel. The operation began in June 1949 and ended in September 1950. Part of the operation happened during the 1948 Palestine War and it was planned by the American Jewish Joint Distribution Committee. The plan was for the Jews from all over Yemen to make their way to the Aden area. Specifically, the Jews were to arrive in Hashed Camp and live there until they could be airlifted to Israel. Hashed was an old British military camp in the desert, about a mile away from the city of Sheikh Othman. The operation took longer than was originally planned. Over the course of the operation, hundreds of migrants died in Hashed Camp, as well as on the plane rides to Israel. This was due to the camps extreme overcrowding and poor hygiene, housing, and medical care. The camps was built to house only 500 people but at points housed at least 12,000. These 12,000 lacked toilets, shelter, swift access to medical care, or a cemetery to bury the many dead. By September 1950, almost 50,000 Jews had been successfully airlifted to the newly formed state of Israel.

A smaller, continuous migration was allowed to continue into 1962, when a civil war put an abrupt halt to any further Jewish exodus.

According to an official statement by Alaska Airlines:

When Alaska Airlines sent them on "Operation Magic Carpet" 50 years ago, Warren and Marian Metzger didn't realize that they were embarking on the adventure of a lifetime. Warren Metzger, a DC-4 captain, and Marian Metzger, a flight attendant, were part of what turned out to be one of the greatest feats in Alaska Airlines' 67-year history: airlifting thousands of Yemenite Jews to the newly created nation of Israel. The logistics of it all made the task daunting. Fuel was hard to come by. Flight and maintenance crews had to be positioned through the Middle East. And the desert sand wreaked havoc on engines.

It took a whole lot of resourcefulness throughout the better part of 1949 to do it. But in the end, despite being shot at and even bombed upon, the mission was accomplished – and without a single loss of life. "One of the things that really got to me was when we were unloading a plane at Tel Aviv," said Marian, who assisted Israeli nurses on a number of flights. "A little old lady came up to me and took the hem of my jacket and kissed it. She was giving me a blessing for getting them home. We were the wings of eagles."

For both Marian and Warren, the assignment came on the heels of flying the airline's other great adventure of the late 1940s: the Berlin Airlift. "I had no idea what I was getting into, absolutely none," remembered Warren, who retired in 1979 as Alaska's chief pilot and vice president of flight operations. "It was pretty much seat-of-the-pants flying in those days. Navigation was by dead reckoning and eyesight. Planes were getting shot at. The airport in Tel Aviv was getting bombed all the time. We had to put extra fuel tanks in the planes so we had the range to avoid landing in Arab territory."

In the wake of the 1948 Arab Israeli War when vast territories were added to the State of Israel, the Jewish Agency under the good offices of Levi Eshkol, then head of the Settlement Department in that Agency, decided to settle many of the new immigrants arriving in Israel in newly founded agricultural communities. The idea was given further impetus when Yosef Weitz of the Jewish National Fund proposed settling many of the country's new immigrants upon agricultural farms built in the recently acquired territories: in the mountainous regions, in Galilee and in the Jerusalem Corridor, places heretofore sparsely settled. It was decided that these new immigrants, many of whom were Yemenites, would make their livelihood by preparing the land for cultivation and planting trees. The first stage of this plan was to call such places "work villages," later to be converted into "cooperative farms" (moshavim). In this manner were established Eshtaol, Yish'i, Ajjur, Dayraban Gimel, Allar Aleph, Allar-Bet, Kesalon, among other places, although the majority of these frontier places were later abandoned by the new immigrants from Yemen for more urban places in central Israel. This prompted Levi Eshkol to write in a letter to Prime-Minister Ben-Gurion (dated 10 April 1950): "The Yemenite vision doesn't allow him to see what he can do in a place of boulders and rocks. He cannot imagine such a development as Neve Ilan which sits upon dry rock. Instead, he imagines that he is being deprived..." Many Yemenite Jews became irreligious through the re-education program of the Jewish Agency.

=== Contemporary history ===
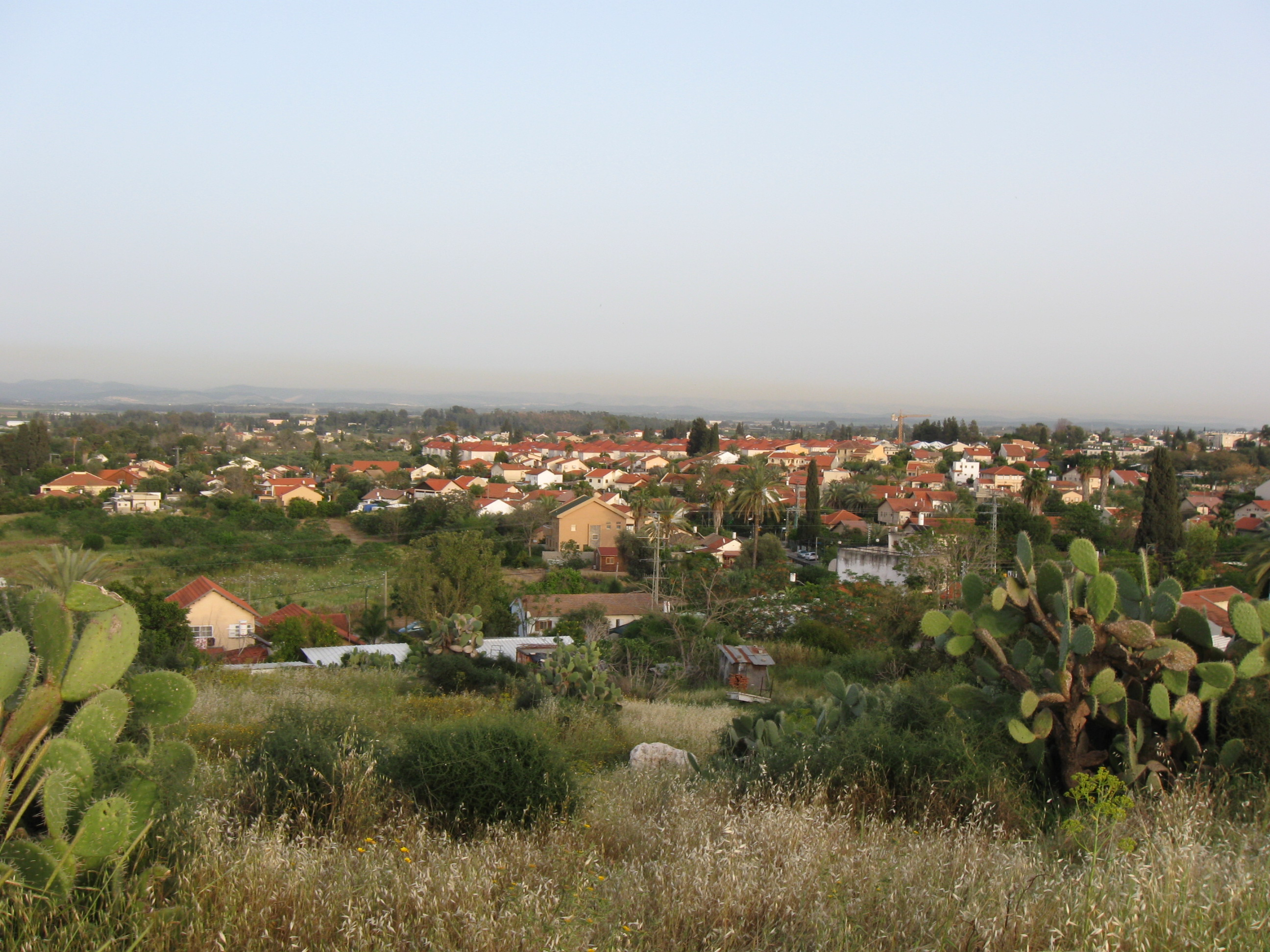
The town of Gedera has a large, possibly 50% Yemenite Jewish population.

==== Missing children (Israel, 1949–51) ====
Claims were made that, between 1949 and 1951, up to 1,033 children of Yemenite immigrant families may have disappeared from the immigrant camps. It was said that the parents were told that their children were ill and required hospitalization. Upon later visiting the hospital, it is claimed that the parents were told that their children had died though no bodies were presented and graves which have later proven to be empty in many cases were shown to the parents. Those who believed the theory contended that the Israeli government as well as other organizations in Israel kidnapped the children and gave them for adoption to other, non-Yemenite, families.

In 2001 a seven-year public inquiry commission concluded that the accusations that Yemenite children were kidnapped by the government are not true. The commission unequivocally rejected claims of a plot to take children away from Yemenite immigrants. The report determined that documentation existed showing that 972 of the 1,033 missing children were deceased. Five additional missing babies were found to be alive. The commission was unable to discover what happened in another 56 cases. With regard to these unresolved 56 cases, the commission deemed it "possible" that the children were handed over for adoption following decisions made by individual local social workers, but not as part of an official policy. In 2016, 400,000 documents were released in regard to the Yemenite Jewish Children affair. In 2016 after having re-examined evidence given to a commission of inquiry in the late 1990s, Cabinet Minister Tzachi Hanegbi told Israeli TV: "They took the children and gave them away. I don't know where." The minister admitted that at least "hundreds" of children were taken without their parent's consent, marking the first time such a public claim had been made by a government official. In December 2021, Haaretz exposed a draft report on the affair whose publication was being suppressed by the Ministry of Health. Written by the outgoing deputy director general and two others, it

"reveals the involvement of doctors, nurses and caregivers in taking the children and acting as middlemen in their adoptions, sometimes in exchange for money. The report chronicles racist perceptions at the time of 'backward immigrants' from Middle Eastern and North African countries, using the pretext of it being in the 'best interests of the children' to justify their being taken away from their biological parents."

This was thought to be the first official reference to the involvement of a ministry in the affair.

==== Final wave of emigration: 1990 to 2016 ====
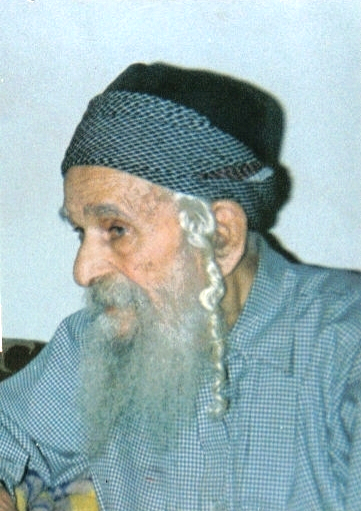
Yemenite Jewish elder, a silversmith, wearing traditional headgear (sudra)

A third wave of emigration from Yemen began in the late 20th-century, with the intercession of Human Rights activist and professor, Hayim Tawil, founder of the International Coalition for the Revival of the Jews of Yemen (ICROJOY) in 1988. Tawil was instrumental in bringing out from Yemen the first Jew to emigrate in 23 years, and who set foot in Israel in September 1990. He was followed by other families in 1992, with the greatest bulk of Jewish families arriving in Israel between 1993 and 1994. These new Yemenite Jewish immigrants settled mainly in Rehovot (Oshiyot), Ashkelon and Beer-Sheva. Other families arrived in 1995 and 1996.

From August 1992 to July 17, 1993, Jews numbering some 246 persons moved to Israel from Yemen, via Germany, and some via the United States.

A small Jewish community existed in the town of Bayt Harash (2 km away from Raydah). They had a rabbi, a functioning synagogue, and a mikveh. They also had a boys yeshiva and a girls seminary, funded by a Satmar-affiliated Hasidic organization in Monsey, New York, U.S. A small Jewish enclave also existed in the town of Raydah, which lies 30 miles (49 km) north of Sanaa. The town hosted a yeshiva, also funded by a Satmar-affiliated organization.

In spite of hostile conditions in recent years for Jews still living in Yemen, Yemeni security forces have gone to great lengths to try to convince the Jews to stay in their towns. These attempts, however, failed, and the authorities were forced to provide financial aid for the Jews so they would be able to rent accommodations in safer areas.

Despite an official ban on emigration, many Yemenite Jews emigrated to Israel, the United States, and the United Kingdom in the 2000s, fleeing anti-Semitic persecution and seeking better Jewish marriage prospects. Many of them had initially gone there to study but had never returned. There was essentially no Jewish population in Sanaa until the Shia insurgency broke out in northern Yemen in 2004. In 2006 it was reported that a Jewish woman in Yemen who had spurned a Muslim suitor had not only been kidnapped and forced to marry him, but had been forced to convert to Islam as well. The Houthis directly threatened the Jewish community in 2007, prompting the government of President Saleh to offer them refuge in Sanaa. As of 2010, around 700 Jews were living in the capital under government protection.

In December 2008, Moshe Ya'ish al-Nahari, a 30-year-old Hebrew teacher and kosher butcher from Raydah, was shot and killed by Abed el-Aziz el-Abadi, a former MiG-29 pilot in the Yemeni Air Force. Abadi confronted Nahari in the Raydah market, and shouted out, "Jew, accept the message of Islam", and opened fire with an AK-47. Nahari was shot five times and died. During interrogation, Abadi proudly confessed his crime, and stated that "these Jews must convert to Islam". Abadi had murdered his wife two years before but had avoided prison by paying her family compensation. The court found Abadi mentally unstable, and ordered him to pay only a fine, but an appeals court sentenced him to death. Yet, he escaped from prison with ten inmates in 2011. Following al-Nahari's murder, the Jewish community expressed its feelings of insecurity, claiming to have received hate mail and threats by phone from Islamic extremists. Dozens of Jews reported receiving death threats and said that they had been subjected to violent harassment. Nahari's killing and continual anti-Semitic harassment prompted approximately 20 other Jewish residents of Raydah to emigrate to Israel. In 2009, five of Nahari's children moved to Israel, and in 2012, his wife and four other children followed, having initially stayed in Yemen so she could serve as a witness in Abadi's trial.

In February 2009, 10 Yemeni Jews migrated to Israel, and in July 2009, three families, or 16 people in total, followed suit. On October 31, 2009, The Wall Street Journal reported that in June 2009, an estimated 350 Jews were left in Yemen, and by October 2009, 60 had emigrated to the United States, and 100 were considering following suit. The BBC estimated that the community numbered 370 and was dwindling. In 2010, it was reported that 200 Yemeni Jews would be allowed to immigrate to the United Kingdom.

In August 2012, Aharon Zindani, a Jewish community leader from Sanaa, was stabbed to death in a market in an anti-Semitic attack. Subsequently, his wife and five children emigrated to Israel, and took his body with them for burial in Israel, with assistance from the Jewish Agency and the Israeli Foreign Ministry.

In January 2013, it was reported that a group of 60 Yemenite Jews had migrated to Israel in a secret operation, arriving in Israel via a flight from Qatar. This was reported to be part of a larger operation which was being carried out in order to bring the approximately 400 Jews left in Yemen to Israel in the coming months.

==== Yemeni civil war to present ====
On October 11, 2015, Likud MK Ayoob Kara stated that members of the Yemenite Jewish community had contacted him to say that the Houthi-led Yemen government had given them an ultimatum to convert or leave the country. A spokesman for the party of former President Ali Abdullah Saleh denied the reports as incorrect.

On March 21, 2016, a group of 19 Yemenite Jews were flown to Israel in a secret operation, leaving the population at about 50. On 7 June 2016, Jews who had been arrested in Yemen after having helped to smuggle out a Torah scroll were released.

In May 2017 the Yemeni-based charity Mona Relief (Yemen Organization for Humanitarian Relief and Development) gave aid to 86 members of the Jewish community in Sanaa.

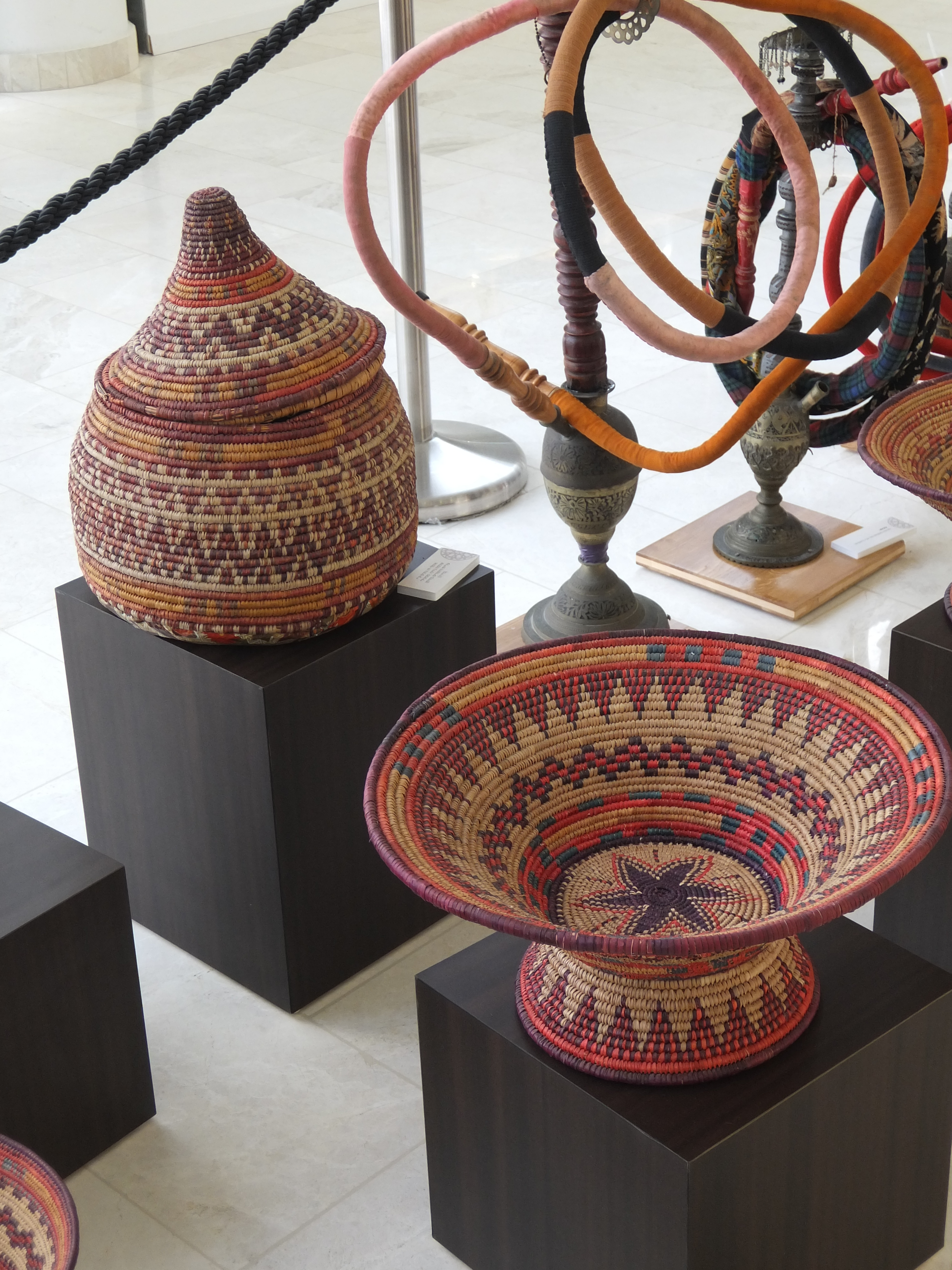
Woven palm-frond and rush baskets, made in Yemen

In a July 2018 interview with a Yemenite rabbi, he claimed that they were definitely treated very well before the recent war in Yemen which has affected all communities in Yemen. He has also said that Yemenite Jews should have never traveled away from Yemen and that he believes thousands of Yemenite Jews will return to Yemen after the war ends.

In 2019, the Mona Relief website reported (February 25): "Mona Relief's team in the capital Sanaa delivered today monthly food aid packages to Jewish minority families in Yemen. Mona Relief has been delivering food aid baskets to Jewish community in the capital Sanaa since 2016. Our project today was funded by Mona Relief's online fundraising campaign in indiegogo..."

As of March 2020, the Jewish cemetery in Aden was destroyed. On April 28, 2020, Yemenite Minister Moammer al-Iryani remarked the fate of the last 50 Jews in Yemen is unknown.

A 2020 World Population Review with a Census of Jewish population by country has no listing of any Jews in Yemen.

On July 13, 2020, it was reported that the Houthi Militia were capturing the last Jews of Yemen of the Kharif District. In their last mention of the Jews in Yemen in July 2020 the Mona Relief reported on their Website that as of July 19, 2020, of the Jewish Population in Yemen there were only a "handful" of Jews in Sanaa.

According to Yemeni publications published in July 2020, the last two Jewish families were waiting for deportation from the areas controlled by the Houthis, which would make Yemen, for the first time in its modern history, devoid of Jews, with the exception of the families of the brothers Suleiman Musa Salem and Sulaiman Yahya Habib in Sanaa and the family of Salem Musa Mara'bi who moved to the complex owned by the Ministry of Defense near the U.S. embassy in 2007 after the Houthis assaulted them and looted their homes. The publications said that a Jewish woman lives with her brother in the Rayda district and a man and his wife live in the Arhab district of the Sanaa Governorate. A source said, "It is now clear that the Houthis want to deport the rest of the Jews, and prevent them from selling their properties at their real prices, and we are surprised that the international community and local and international human rights organizations have remained silent towards the process of forced deportation and forcing the Jews to leave their country and prevent them from disposing of their property.

In August 2020 of an estimated 100 or so remaining Yemen Jews, 42 have migrated to UAE and the rest would also leave. On November 10, 2020, the U.S. State Department called for the immediate and unconditional release of Levi Salem Musa Marhabi, one of the last remaining Yemenite Jews in Yemen. A press statement said Marhabi has been wrongfully detained by the Houthi militia for four years, despite a court ordering his release in September 2019. In December 2020 an Israeli Rabbi visited the Yemenite Jews who escaped to the UAE.

On 28 March 2021, 13 Jews were forced by the Houthis to leave Yemen; less than 10 Jews still resided in Yemen. According to one report there are six Jews left in Yemen: one woman; her brother; 3 others, and Levi Salem Marhabi (who has been imprisoned for helping smuggle a Torah scroll out of Yemen). The Jerusalem Post reported that the remaining Jewish population in Yemen consists of four elderly Jews, ending the continuous presence of a community that dated back to antiquity. In December 2021 the Jews of Yemen received Hanukkah kits. In March 2022 the United Nations reported there is just one Jew in Yemen (Levi Salem Marhabi), however Ynet cited local sources stating that as of 19 June 2024 the actual number is five.(one of the last Jews in Yemen Yihye Ben-Yosef had just died leaving Marhabi and four others still alive)

=== Timeline of events ===
628 BCE or 463 BCE	According to tradition, Jews first settled in Yemen 42 years before the destruction of the First Temple.
68 CE	The Jewish Diaspora at the time of the Second Temple's destruction, according to Josephus, was in Parthia (Persia), Babylonia (Iraq), and Arabia, as well as some Jews beyond the Euphrates and in Adiabene. In Josephus' own words, he had informed "the remotest Arabians" about the destruction. These Jews are believed to have been the progenitors of the Jews of Yemen.
c. 250 CE	Jewish elder from Yemen (Himyar) brought for burial in Beit She'arim, burial site of Rabbi Yehudah Ha-Nassi.
390 CE	The Himyarite king Abu Karib converts to Judaism.
470–77	Jews from Yemen (Himyar) brought to burial in Zoara.
524	Jewish king, Yûsuf 'As'ar Yath'ar, known also in the Islamic tradition as Dhū Nuwās, lays siege to the city Najran and takes it.
1165	Benjamin of Tudela, in his Itinerary of Benjamin of Tudela, mentions two Jewish brothers, one who lives in Tilmas (i.e. Sa'dah of Yemen), who traced their lineage to king David
1174	Maimonides writes his Iggeret Teman (Epistle to Yemen) to the Jews of Yemen
1216	Jews of Yemen send thirteen questions to Rabbi Abraham ben Maimonides, relating to halacha
1346	Rabbi Yehoshua Hanagid carries on a correspondence with Rabbi David b. Amram al-Adeni, the leader of the Jewish community in Yemen, in which more than 100 Questions & Responsa are exchanged between them.
1457	Old Synagogue in Sanaa destroyed because of warring between Imam Al-Mutawakkil al-Mutahhar and Az-Zafir ʻAmir I bin Ṭāhir
1489	Rabbi Obadiah di Bertinora encounters Jews from Yemen while in Jerusalem.
1567	Zechariah (Yaḥya) al-Ḍāhirī visited Rabbi Joseph Karo's yeshiva in Safed
1666	Decree of the Headgear (Ar. al-'amā'im ) in which Jews were forbidden by an edict to wear turbans (pl. 'amā'im) on their heads from that time forward
1679–80	the Exile of Mawzaʻ
1724	Great famine in Yemen, causing many of the poor and impoverished Jews to convert to Islam
1761	Destruction of twelve synagogues in Sanaa by Imam Al-Mahdi Abbas
1763	Carsten Niebuhr visits Yemen, describing his visit with the Jews of Yemen in book, Reisebeschreibung nach Arabien und andern umliegenden Ländern (Description of Travel to Arabia and Other Neighboring Countries)
1805	Rabbi Yiḥya Saleh (Maharitz), eminent Yemenite scholar, jurist and exponent of Jewish law, dies.
1859	Yaakov Saphir visits Yemen, describing his visit with the Jews of Yemen in book, Even Sapir.
1882	First modern mass emigration of Jews from Yemen, who sailed the Red Sea, crossed Egypt and sailed the Mediterranean to a port in Jaffa, and then by foot to Jerusalem. This immigration was popularly given the mnemonics, aʻaleh betamar (literally, 'I shall go up on the date palm tree,' a verse taken from Song of Songs). The Hebrew word "betamar" = בתמר has the numerical value of 642, which they expounded to mean, 'I shall go up (i.e. make the pilgrimage) in the year [5]642 anno mundi (here, abbreviated without the millennium), or what was then 1882 CE.
1902	Rabbi Yihya Yitzhak Halevi appointed judge and president of court at Sanaa
1907	The Ottoman government of Palestine recognizes the Yemenites as an independent community (just as Ashkenazim and Sepharadim are independent communities); Second-wave of emigration from Yemen (from the regions of Saʿadah and Ḥaydan ash-Sham)
1909	German Jewish photographer, Hermann Burchardt, killed in Yemen.
1910	Yomtob Sémach, an envoy from the Alliance Israélite Universelle, scouts out the possibility of opening a school in Yemen.
1911	Zionist envoy Shmuel Warshawsky (later named Shmuel Yavne'eli) sent to Yemen, and persuades some 2,000 Yemenite Jews to make the aliya to Eretz Israel.
1911	Abraham Isaac Kook, Chief Rabbi in Ottoman Palestine, addresses twenty-six questions to the heads of the Jewish community in Yemen
1912	Third-wave of emigration from Yemen (an emigration that continued until the outbreak of WWI in 1914)
1927	A manuscript containing Nathan ben Abraham's 11th-century Mishnah commentary was discovered in the genizah of the Jewish community of Sanaa, Yemen.
1949	Imam Ahmad announces that any Jew who is interested in leaving Yemen is permitted to do so.
1949–50	Operation On Eagles' Wings (also called Operation Magic Carpet) brings to Israel some 48,000 Yemenite Jews

== Religious traditions ==
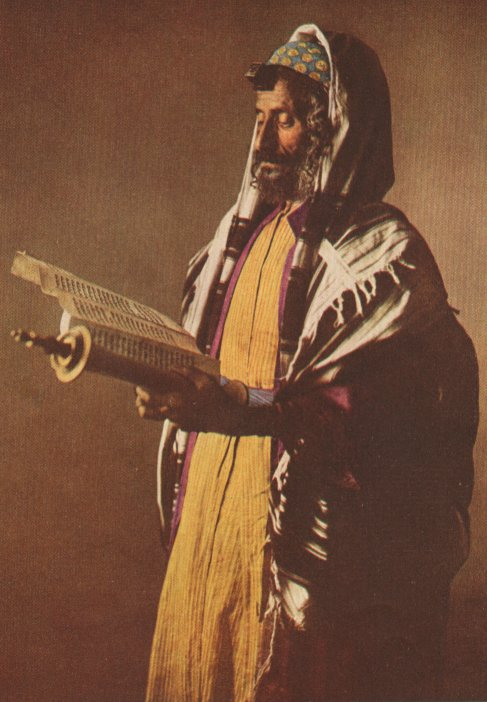
1914 photograph of a Yemenite Jew in traditional vestments under the tallit gadol, reading from a scroll

Yemenite Jews and the Aramaic-speaking Kurdish Jews are the only communities who maintain the tradition of reading the Torah in the synagogue in both Hebrew and the Aramaic Targum ("translation"). Most non-Yemenite synagogues have a specified person called a Baal Koreh, who reads from the Torah scroll when congregants are called to the Torah scroll for an aliyah. In the Yemenite tradition, each person called to the Torah scroll for an aliyah reads for himself. Children under the age of Bar Mitzvah are often given the sixth aliyah. Each verse of the Torah read in Hebrew is followed by the Aramaic translation, usually chanted by a child. Both the sixth aliyah and the Targum have a simplified melody, distinct from the general Torah melody used for the other aliyot.

Like most other Jewish communities, Yemenite Jews chant different melodies for Torah, Prophets (Haftara), Megillat Aicha (Book of Lamentations), Kohelet (Ecclesiastes, read during Sukkot), and Megillat Esther (the Scroll of Esther read on Purim). Unlike Ashkenazic communities, there are melodies for Mishle (Proverbs) and Psalms.

Every Yemenite Jew knew how to read from the Torah Scroll with the correct pronunciation and tune, exactly right in every detail. Each man who was called up to the Torah read his section by himself. All this was possible because children right from the start learned to read without any vowels. Their diction is much more correct than the Sephardic and Ashkenazic dialect. The results of their education are outstanding, for example if someone is speaking with his neighbor and needs to quote a verse from the Bible, he speaks it out by heart, without pause or effort, with its melody.

— Stanley Mann

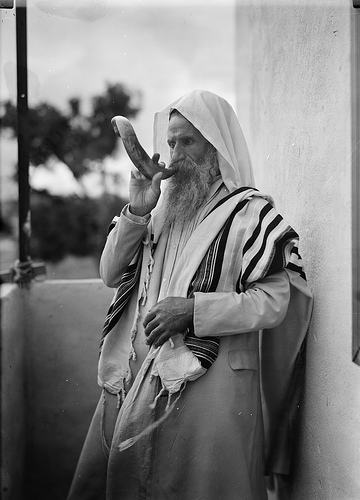
Yemenite Jew sounding the Shofar, 1930s Mandatory Palestine (possibly Jerusalem)

In larger Jewish communities, such as Sanaa and Saada, boys were sent to the mori at the age of three to begin their religious learning. They attended the mori from early dawn to sunset on Sunday through Thursday and until noon on Friday. Jewish women were required to have a thorough knowledge of the laws pertaining to Kashrut and Taharat Mishpachah (family purity) i.e. Niddah. Some women even mastered the laws of Shechita, thereby acting as ritual slaughterers.

People also sat on the floors of synagogues instead of sitting on chairs, similar to the way many other non-Ashkenazi Jews sat in Synagogue. This is in accordance with what Rambam (Maimonides) wrote in his Mishneh Torah:

Synagogues and houses of study must be treated with respect. They are swept and sprinkled to lay the dust. In Spain, and in the Maghreb (Morocco), in Babylonia (Iraq), and in the Holy Land, it is customary to kindle lamps in the synagogues, and to spread mats on the floor on which the worshippers sit. In the lands of Edom (Christendom), they sit in synagogues on chairs [or benches].

— Hilchot Tefillah 11:4 [5]

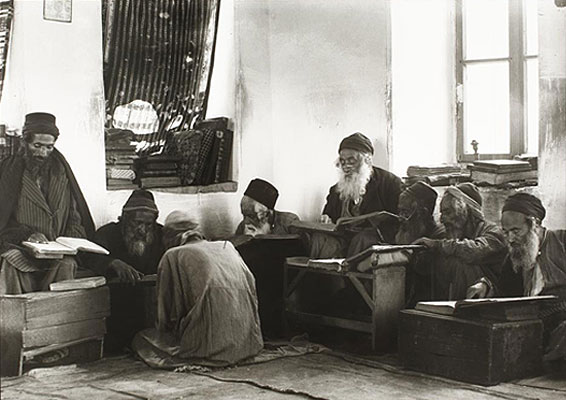
Elders studying in a synagogue in Ottoman Palestine (1906–1918)

The lack of chairs may also have been to provide more space for prostration, another ancient Jewish observance that the Jews of Yemen continued to practise until very recent times. There are still a few Yemenite Jews who prostrate themselves during the part of everyday Jewish prayer called Tachanun (Supplication), though such individuals usually do so in privacy. In the small Jewish community that exists today in Bet Harash, prostration is still done during the tachanun prayer. Jews of European origin generally prostrate only during certain portions of special prayers during Rosh Hashanah (Jewish New Year) and Yom Kippur (Day of Atonement). Prostration was a common practise amongst all Jews until some point during the late Middle Ages or Renaissance period.

Like Yemenite Jewish homes, the synagogues in Yemen had to be lower in height than the lowest mosque in the area. In order to accommodate this, synagogues were built into the ground to give them more space without looking large from the outside. In some parts of Yemen, minyanim would often just meet in homes of Jews, instead of the community having a separate building for a synagogue. Beauty and artwork were saved for the ritual objects in the synagogue and in the home.

Yemenite Jews also wore a distinctive tallit often found to this day. The Yemenite tallit features a wide atara and large corner patches, embellished with silver or gold thread, and the fringes along the sides of the tallit are netted. According to the Baladi custom, the tzitzit are tied with seven chulyot (hitches), based on Maimonides' teaching.

On Sabbath days, the traditional Yemenite bread was not the Challah, as found in Western Jewish communities, but the Kubaneh, which was eaten on Sabbath mornings after first making the blessing over two flatbreads baked in an earthen oven.

=== Weddings and marriage traditions ===
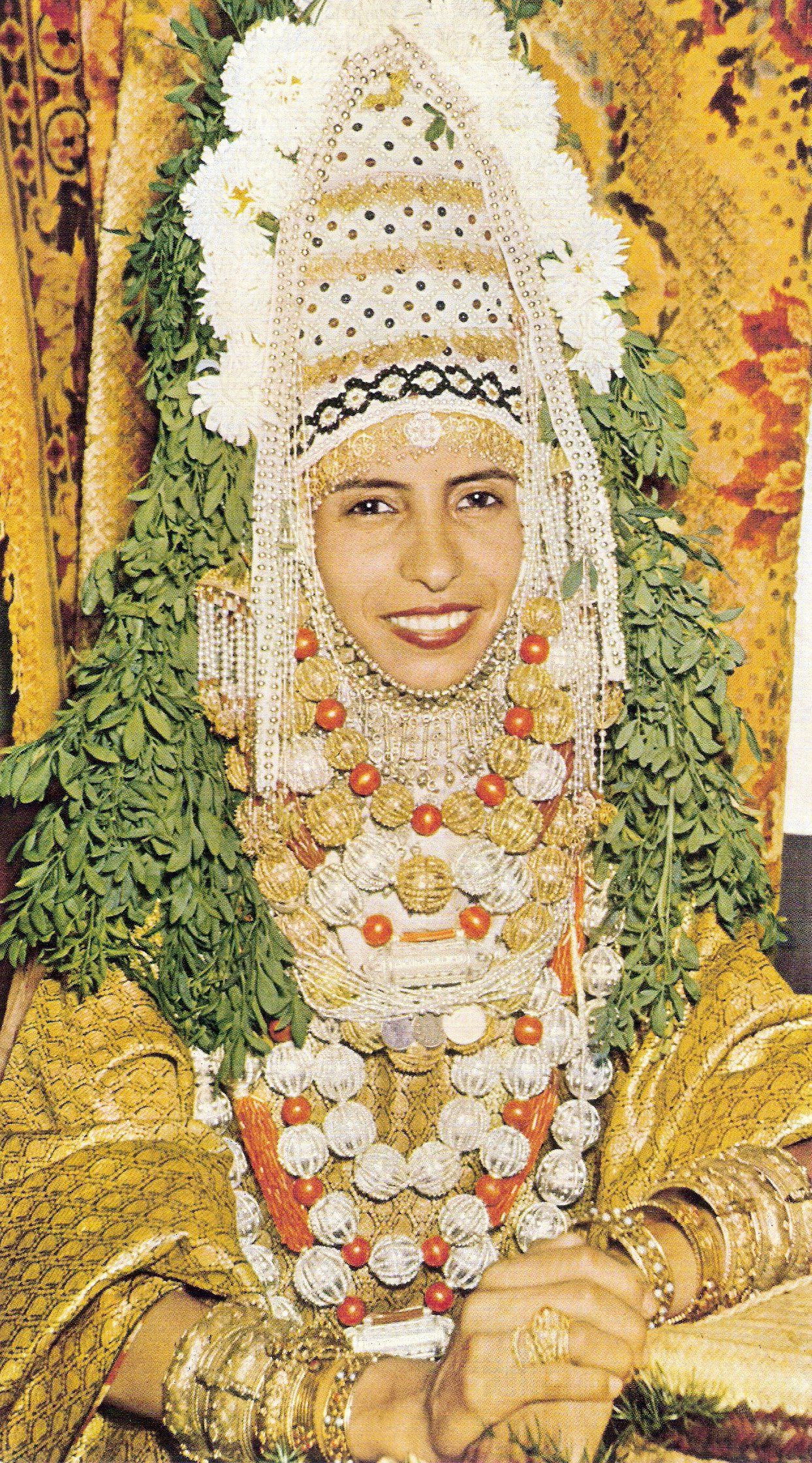
A bride in traditional Yemenite Jewish bridal vestment, in Israel 1958.

During a Yemenite Jewish wedding, the bride was bedecked with jewelry and wore a traditional wedding costume, including an elaborate headdress decorated with flowers and rue leaves, which were believed to ward off evil. Gold threads were woven into the fabric of her clothing. Songs were sung as part of a seven-day wedding celebration, with lyrics about friendship and love in alternating verses of Hebrew and Arabic.

In Yemen, the Jewish practice was not for the groom and his bride to be secluded in a canopy (chuppah) hung on four poles, as is widely practiced today in Jewish weddings, but rather in a bridal chamber that was, in effect, a highly decorated room in the house of the groom. This room was traditionally decorated with large hanging sheets of colored, patterned cloth, replete with wall cushions and short-length mattresses for reclining. Their marriage is consummated when they have been left together alone in this room. This ancient practice finds expression in the writings of Isaac ben Abba Mari (c. 1122 – c. 1193), author of Sefer ha-'Ittur, concerning the Benediction of the Bridegroom: "Now the chuppah is when her father delivers her unto her husband, bringing her into that house wherein is some new innovation, such as the sheets… surrounding the walls, etc. For we recite in the Jerusalem Talmud, Sotah 46a (Sotah 9:15), 'Those bridal chambers, (chuppoth hathanim), they hang within them patterned sheets and gold-embroidered ribbons,' etc."

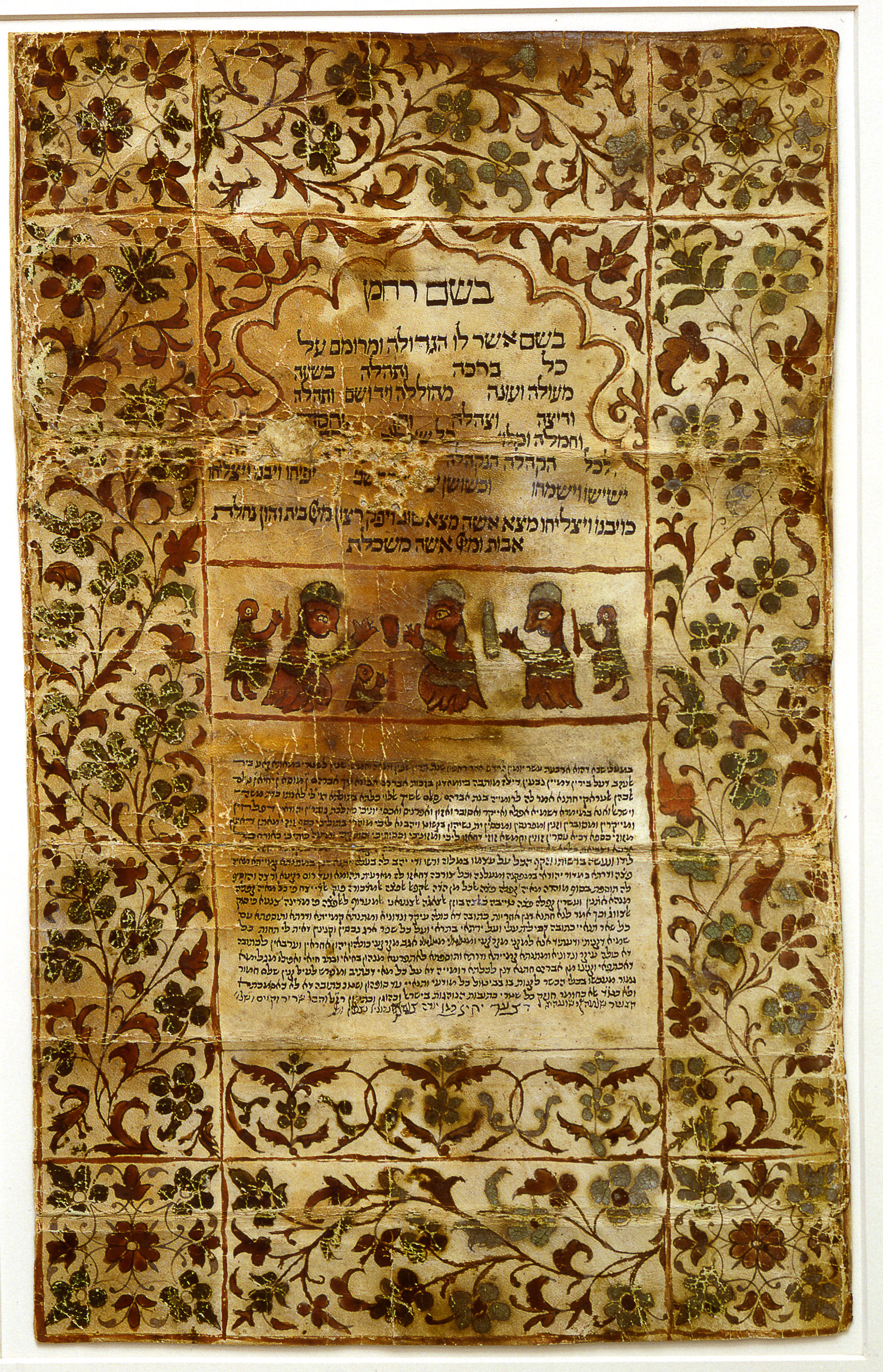
Yemenite Ketubah from 1794, now at the Bezalel Academy of Arts and Design

After immigration to Israel, the regional varieties of Yemenite bridal jewelry were replaced by a uniform item that became identified with the community: the splendid bridal garb of Sanaa.

Before the wedding, Yemenite and other Eastern Jewish communities perform the henna ceremony, an ancient ritual with Bronze Age origins. The family of the bride mixes a paste derived from the henna plant that is placed on the palms of the bride and groom, and their guests. After the paste is washed off, a deep orange stain remains that gradually fades over the next week.

Yemenites had a special affinity for Henna due to biblical and Talmudic references. Henna, in the Bible, is Camphire, and is mentioned in the Song of Solomon, as well as in the Talmud. This tradition is also practiced by Pashtuns and Afghan Jews.

"My Beloved is unto me as a cluster of Camphire in the vineyards of En-Gedi" Song of Solomon, 1:14

A Yemenite Jewish wedding custom specific only to the community of Aden is the Talbis, revolving around the groom. A number of special songs are sung by the men while holding candles, and the groom is dressed in a golden garment.

=== Religious groups ===
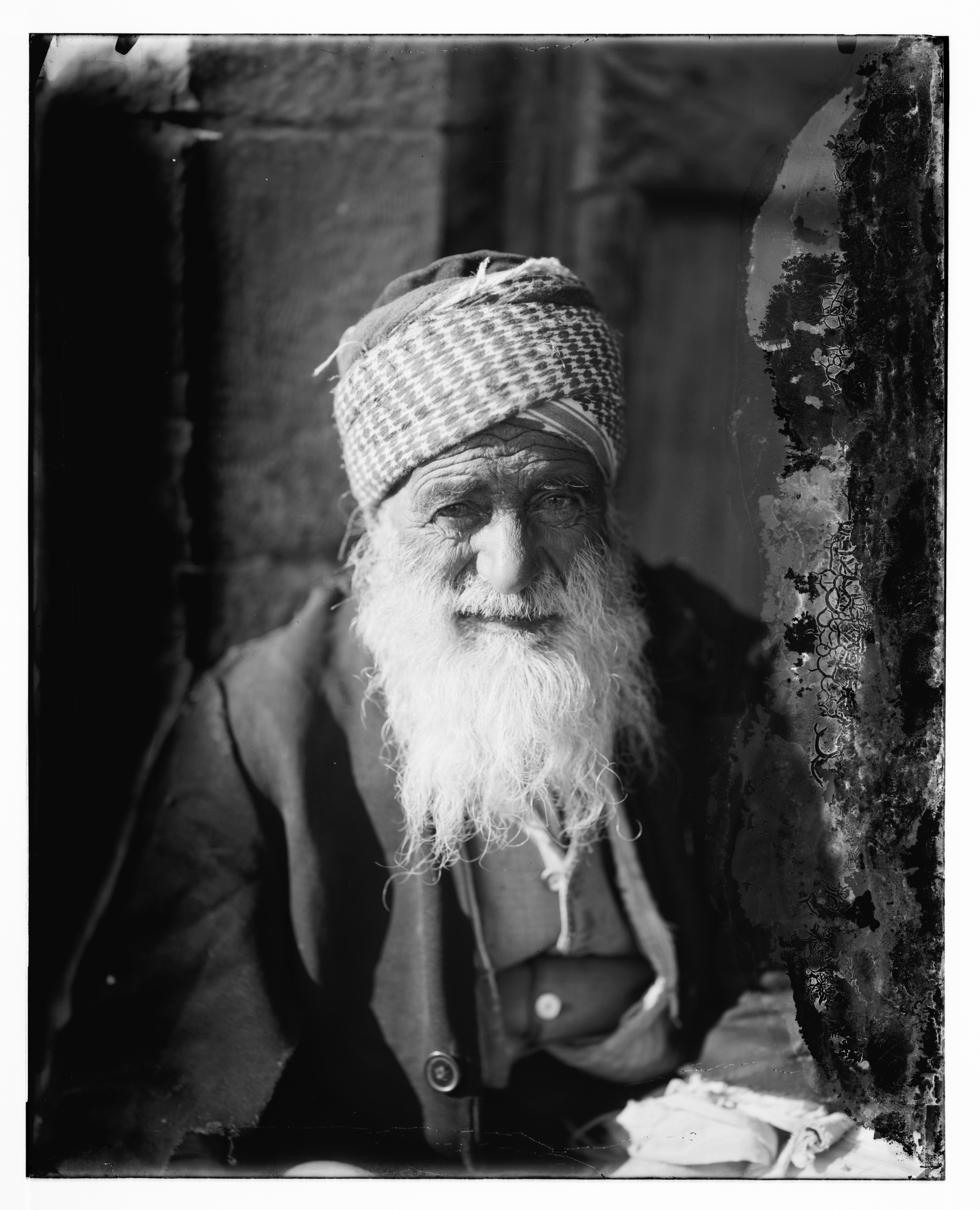
Elderly Yemenite Jew, between 1898 and 1914.

The three main groups of Yemenite Jews are the Baladi, Shami, and the Maimonideans or "Rambamists". In addition, the "Rechabites" are a tribe in Sanaa claiming to be descendants of Jehonadab that was found in 1839 by Reverend Joseph Wolff, who later went to Bukhara to attempt to save Lieutenant Colonel Charles Stoddart and Captain Arthur Conolly.

The differences between these groups largely concern the respective influence of the original Yemenite tradition, which was largely based on the works of Maimonides, and on the Kabbalistic tradition embodied in the Zohar and in the school of Isaac Luria, which was increasingly influential from the 17th century on.

- The Baladi Jews (from Arabic balad, country) generally follow the legal rulings of the Rambam (Maimonides) as codified in his work the Mishneh Torah. Their liturgy was developed by a rabbi known as the Maharitz (Moreinu Ha-Rav Yiḥya Tzalaḥ), in an attempt to break the deadlock between the pre-existing followers of Maimonides and the new followers of the mystic, Isaac Luria. It substantially follows the older Yemenite tradition, with only a few concessions to the usages of the Ari. A Baladi Jew may or may not accept the Kabbalah theologically: if he does, he regards himself as following Luria's own advice that every Jew should follow his ancestral tradition.
- The Shami Jews (from Arabic ash-Sham, the north, referring to the region of Syria including Israel) represent those who accepted the Sephardic/Mizrahi rite and lines of rabbinic authority, after being exposed to new inexpensive, typeset siddurs (prayer books) brought from Israel and the Sephardic diaspora by envoys and merchants in the late 17th century and 18th century. The "local rabbinic leadership resisted the new versions ... Nevertheless, the new prayer books were widely accepted." As part of that process, the Shami accepted the Zohar and modified their rites to accommodate the usages of the Ari to the maximum extent. The text of the Shami siddur now largely follows the Sephardic tradition, though the pronunciation, chant and customs are still Yemenite in flavour. They generally base their legal rulings both on the Rambam (Maimonides) and on the Shulchan Aruch (Code of Jewish Law). In their interpretation of Jewish law, Shami Yemenite Jews were strongly influenced by Syrian Sephardi Jews, though on some issues, they rejected the later European codes of Jewish law, and instead followed the earlier decisions of Maimonides. Most Yemenite Jews living today follow the Shami customs. The Shami rite was always more prevalent, even 50 years ago.
- The "Rambamists" are followers of, or to some extent influenced by, the Dor Daim movement, and are strict followers of Talmudic law as compiled by Maimonides, aka "Rambam". They are regarded as a subdivision of the Baladi Jews, and claim to preserve the Baladi tradition in its pure form. They generally reject the Zohar and Lurianic Kabbalah altogether. Many of them object to terms like "Rambamist". In their eyes, they are simply following the most ancient preservation of Torah, which (according to their research) was recorded in the Mishneh Torah.

==== School reform dispute (Dor Daim vs Iqshim) ====
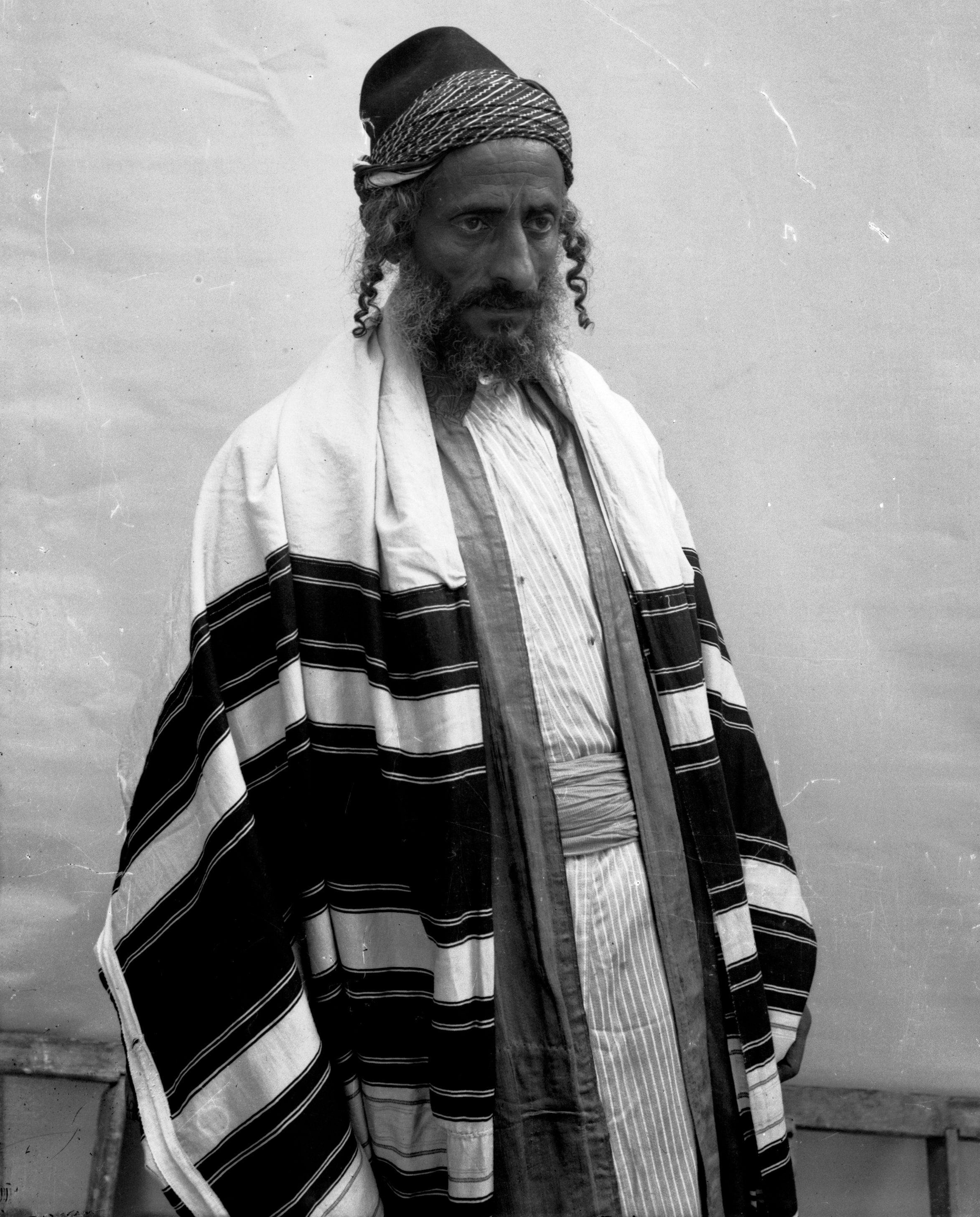
Yemenite Jew in Jerusalem, late 19th century.

Towards the end of the 19th century, new ideas began to reach Yemenite Jews from abroad. Hebrew newspapers began to arrive, and relations developed with Sephardic Jews, who came to Yemen from various Ottoman provinces to trade with the army and government officials.

Two Jewish travelers, Joseph Halévy, a French-trained Jewish Orientalist, and Eduard Glaser, an Austrian-Jewish astronomer and Arabist, in particular had a strong influence on a group of young Yemenite Jews, the most outstanding of whom was Rabbi Yiḥyah Qafiḥ. As a result of his contact with Halévy and Glaser, Qafiḥ introduced modern content into the educational system. Qafiḥ opened a new school and, in addition to traditional subjects, introduced arithmetic, Hebrew and Arabic, with the grammar of both languages. The curriculum also included subjects such as natural science, history, geography, astronomy, sports and Turkish.

The Dor Daim and Iqshim dispute about the Zohar literature broke out in 1912, inflamed Sanaa's Jewish community, and split it into two rival groups that maintained separate communal institutions until the late 1940s. Rabbi Qafiḥ and his friends were the leaders of a group of Maimonideans called Dor Daim (the "generation of knowledge"). Their goal was to bring Yemenite Jews back to the original Maimonidean method of understanding Judaism that existed in pre-17th-century Yemen.

Similar to certain Spanish and Portuguese Jews (Western Sephardi Jews), the Dor Daim rejected the Zohar, a book of esoteric mysticism. They felt that the Kabbalah which was based on the Zohar was irrational, alien, and inconsistent with the true reasonable nature of Judaism. In 1913, when it seemed that Rabbi Qafiḥ, then headmaster of the new Jewish school and working closely with the Ottoman authorities, enjoyed sufficient political support, the Dor Daim made its views public, and tried to convince the entire community to accept them. Many of the non-Dor Deah elements of the community rejected the Dor Deah concepts. The opposition, the Iqshim, headed by Rabbi Yiḥya Yiṣḥaq, the Hakham Bashi, refused to deviate from the accepted customs and from the study of the Zohar. One of the Iqshim's targets in the fight against Rabbi Qafiḥ was his modern Turkish-Jewish school. Due to the Dor Daim and Iqshim dispute, the school closed 5 years after it was opened, before the educational system could develop a reserve of young people who had been exposed to its ideas.

==== Yemenite rabbis ====
- Solomon Adeni (1567–1625)
- Yihye Bashiri (died 1661)
- Zechariah Dhahiri (c. 1531–1608)
- Hayyim Habshush (c. 1833–1899)
- Yihya Yitzhak Halevi (1867–1932)
- Avraham Al-Naddaf (1866–1940)
- Yosef Qafih (1917–2000)
- Yiḥyah Qafiḥ (1850–1931)
- Amram Qorah (1871–1952)
- Mordechai Sharabi (1908–1994)
- Maharitz (Yihya Salah) (1713–1805)
- Shalom Shabazi (1619–c. 1720)
- Uzi Meshulam (1952–2013)
- David ben Amram Adani (14th century)
- Nethanel ben Isaiah (14th century)
- Zechariah ha-Rofé (15th century)
- Natan'el al-Fayyumi (c. 1090–1165)
- Jacob ben Nathanael (12th century)
- Shalom Sharabi (1720–1777)

=== Education ===
Education of children was of paramount importance to Jewish fathers in Yemen, who, as a rule, sent their children from an early age to study the portions of the Torah, usually under the tutelage of a local teacher. Often, such teachings were conducted in the home of their teacher. It was not uncommon for the teacher to be occupied in his trade (coat maker, weaver, etc.) while instructing his students. All instruction consisted of the recital and memorization of sacred texts. The most astute of these students, when they came of age, pursued after a higher Jewish education and which almost always entailed studying Shechita (ritual slaughter), and receiving a license (Hebrew: הרשאה) from a qualified instructor to slaughter domestic livestock.

==== Baladi-rite and Shami-rite prayer books ====
- Siaḥ Yerushalayim, Baladi prayer book in 4 vols, ed. Yosef Qafih
- Tefillat Avot, Baladi prayer book (6 vols.)
- Torat Avot, Baladi prayer book (7 vols.)
- Tiklal Ha-Mefoar (Maharitz) Nusaḥ Baladi, Meyusad Al Pi Ha-Tiklal Im Etz Ḥayim Ha-Shalem Arukh Ke-Minhag Yahaduth Teiman: Bene Berak: Or Neriyah ben Mosheh Ozeri: 2001 or 2002
- Siddur Tefillat HaḤodesh — Beit Yaakov (Nusaḥ Shami), Nusaḥ Sepharadim, Teiman, and the Edoth Mizraḥ
- Rabbi Shalom Sharabi, Siddur Kavanot HaRashash: Yeshivat HaChaim Ve'Hashalom
- Hatiklāl Hamevo'ar (Baladi-rite), ed. Pinḥas Qoraḥ, Benei Barak 2006

== Yemenite Jewish culture ==
=== Yemenite Hebrew ===
Yemenite Hebrew has been studied by scholars, many of whom believe it to contain the most ancient phonetic and grammatical features. There are two main pronunciations of Yemenite Hebrew, considered by many scholars to be the most accurate modern-day form of Biblical Hebrew, although there are technically a total of five that relate to the regions of Yemen. In the Yemenite dialect, all Hebrew letters have a distinct sound, except for sāmeḵ (Hebrew: ס) and śîn (Hebrew: שׂ), which are both pronounced /s/. The Sanaani Hebrew pronunciation (used by the majority) has been indirectly critiqued by Saadia Gaon since it contains the Hebrew letters jimmel and guf, which he rules is incorrect. There are Yemenite scholars, such as Rabbi Ratzon Arusi, who say that such a perspective is a misunderstanding of Saadia Gaon's words.

Rabbi Mazuz postulates this hypothesis through the Djerban (Tunisia) Jewish dialect's use of gimmel and quf, switching to jimmel and guf when talking with Gentiles in the Arabic dialect of Jerba. While Jewish boys learned Hebrew from the age of 3, it was used primarily as a liturgical and scholarly language. In daily life, Yemenite Jews spoke in regional Judeo-Arabic.

=== Yemenite Jewish literature ===
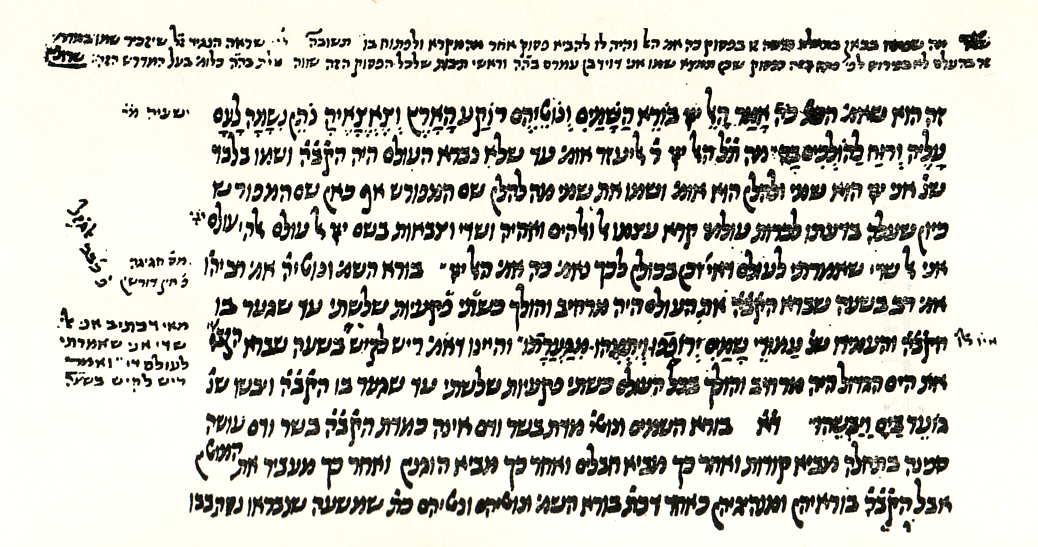
Manuscript page from Yemenite Midrash ha-Gadol on Genesis.

The oldest Yemenite manuscripts are those of the Hebrew Bible, which the Yemenite Jews call "Taj" ("crown"). The oldest texts dating from the 9th century, and each of them has a short Masoretic introduction, while many contain Arabic commentaries.

Yemenite Jews were acquainted with the works of Saadia Gaon, Rashi, Kimhi, Nahmanides, Yehudah ha Levy and Isaac Arama, besides producing a number of exegetes from among themselves. In the 14th century, Nathanael ben Isaiah wrote an Arabic commentary on the Bible; in the second half of the 15th century, Saadia ben David al-Adeni was the author of a commentary on Leviticus, Numbers, and Deuteronomy. Abraham ben Solomon wrote on the Prophets.

Among the midrash collections from Yemen mention should be made of the Midrash ha-Gadol of David bar Amram al-Adeni. Between 1413 and 1430 the physician Yaḥya Zechariah b. Solomon wrote a compilation entitled "Midrash ha-Ḥefeẓ," which included the Pentateuch, Lamentations, Book of Esther, and other sections of the Hebrew Bible. Between 1484 and 1493 David al-Lawani composed his "Midrash al-Wajiz al-Mughni." The earliest complete Judeo-Arabic copy of Maimonides' Guide for the Perplexed, copied in Yemen in 1380, was found in the India Office Library and added to the collection of the British Library in 1992.

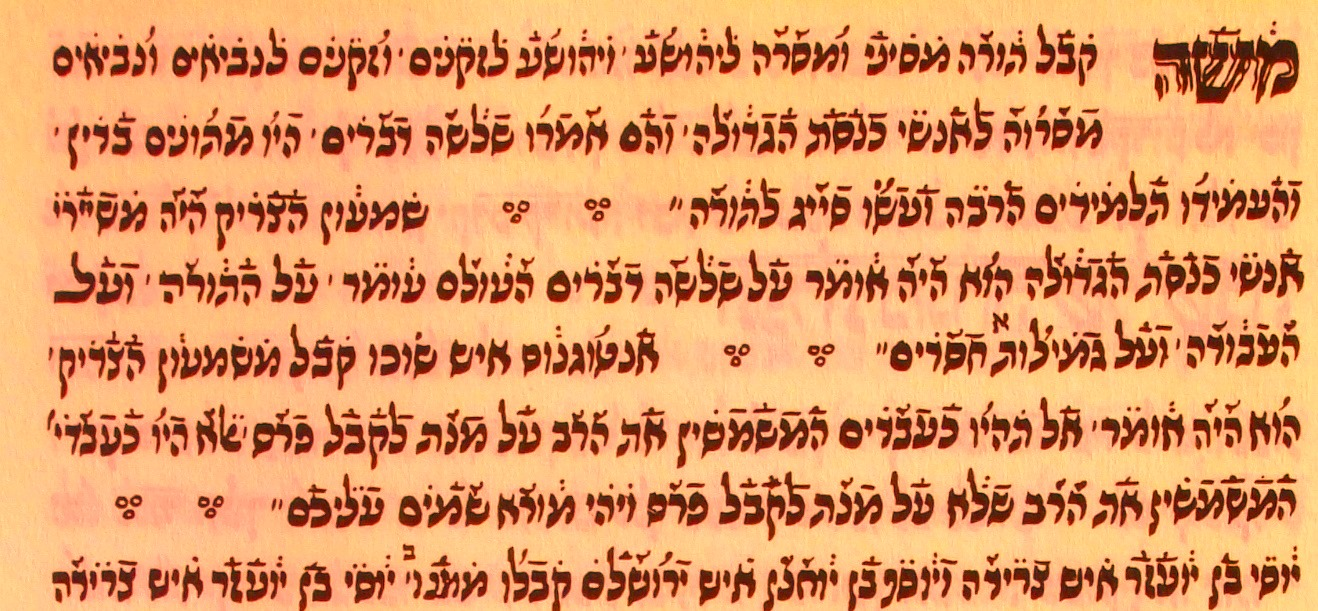
Section of Yemenite Siddur, with Babylonian supralinear punctuation (Pirke Avot)

Among the Yemenite poets who wrote Hebrew and Arabic hymns modeled after the Spanish school, mention may be made of Zechariah (Yaḥya) al-Dhahiri and the members of the Shabazi family. Al-Dhahiri's work, which makes use of the poetic genre known as maqāmah, a style inspired by Ḥariri, was written in 1573 under the title Sefer ha-Musar. Herein, the author describes in 45 chapters his travels throughout India, Iraq, Turkey, Syria, the Land of Israel and Egypt, including a description of Rabbi Yosef Karo's seat of learning in Safed. The philosophical writers include: Saadia b. Jabeẓ and Saadia b. Mas'ud, both at the beginning of the 14th century; Ibn al-Ḥawas, the author of a treatise in the form of a dialogue written in rhymed prose, and termed by its author the "Flower of Yemen"; Ḥasan al-Dhamari; and Joseph ha-Levi b. Jefes, who wrote the philosophical treatises "Ner Yisrael" (1420) and "Kitab al-Masaḥah."

=== Yemenite Jewish clothing ===
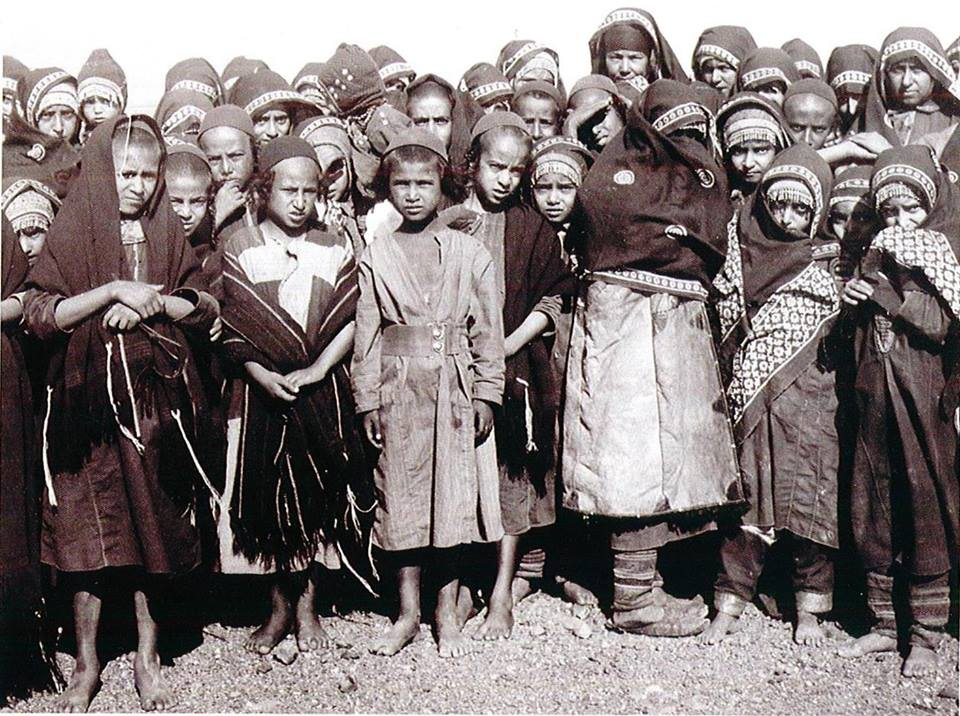
Jewish children in Sanaa, Yemen (c. 1909)

==== Men's clothing ====
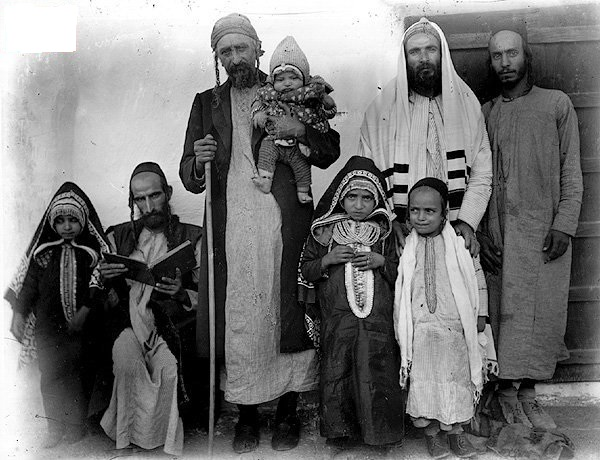
Abraham b. Abraham Yitzhak Halevi and family, photo by Yihye Haybi, ca. 1940

A Tunic (Hebrew: חלוק) and habit (Hebrew: סודר; Aramaic: סודרא), the latter made with a central hat (Hebrew: כומתא), were the traditional items of clothing worn by a married Jewish man in Yemen. Leading rabbinic scholar and sage, Rabbi Yosef Qafih, described the manner in which they would wrap their habits, saying that the habit was sometimes worn while wrapped around a man's head, or simply partly draped over his head. German ethnographer Erich Brauer (1895–1942) described the differences between Jewish and Gentile garb, making note of the fact that the differences existed only in their outer garments, but not in their undergarments. He also offered the following description:

Instead of trousers, the Yemenite Jews (as well as Yemen's Arabs) carry a piece of cloth worn around the hip (loincloth), called maizar. The expression fūṭa, quoted by Sapir (Jacob Saphir), is used [for the same piece of clothing] by the Jews in Aden and partly also by Arabs from Yemen. The maizar consists of one piece of dark-blue cotton that is wound a few times around the waist and which is held up by a belt made of cloth material or leather. The maizar is allowed to reach down to the knees only. Today, the Yemenites will, therefore, wear [underwear made like unto] short-length trousers, called sirwāl, [instead of the traditional loincloth beneath their tunics]. A blue shirt that has a split that extends down to the waistline and that is closed at neck level is worn over the maizar. If the shirt is multicolored and striped, it is called tahṭāni, meaning, 'the lower.' If it is monochrome, it is called antari. Finally, the outer layer of clothing, worn over the maizar and antari, is a dark-blue cotton tunic (Arabic: gufṭān or kufṭān). The tunic is a coat-like garment that extends down to the knees which is fully open in the front and is closed with a single button in the neck. Over the tunic, the Jewish people were not allowed to wear a girdle.

As noted, some of the men's dress-codes were forced upon them by laws of the State. For example, formerly in Yemen, Jews were not allowed to wear clothing of any color besides blue. Earlier, in Jacob Saphir's time (1859), they'd wear outer garments that were "utterly black." When German-Danish explorer, Carsten Niebuhr, visited Yemen in 1763, the only person he saw wearing the blue-colored tunic was the Jewish courtier, the Minister and Prince, Sālim b. Aharon Irāqi Ha-Kohen, who served under two kings for a period of no less than twenty-eight years.

The traditional Yemenite tallīt is a full-length tallīt made from fine wool or goat's hair of a single black or brown color, called šämläh, but it was not unique unto Jews alone. Muslims would also wear similar items of covering, to protect them from the heat or rain. Jewish garments, however, bore the ritual fringes prescribed for such garments. The wearing of such garments was not unique to prayer time alone, but was worn the entire day. Later, decorative black and white striped shawls were imported into the country from Europe, and which were highly valued by the Jews of Yemen who wore them on special occasions and on the Sabbath day. The small tallīt (ṭallīt kaṭan) was introduced into Yemen via Aden from European centers, and principally worn by rabbis and educated persons.

==== Women's clothing ====
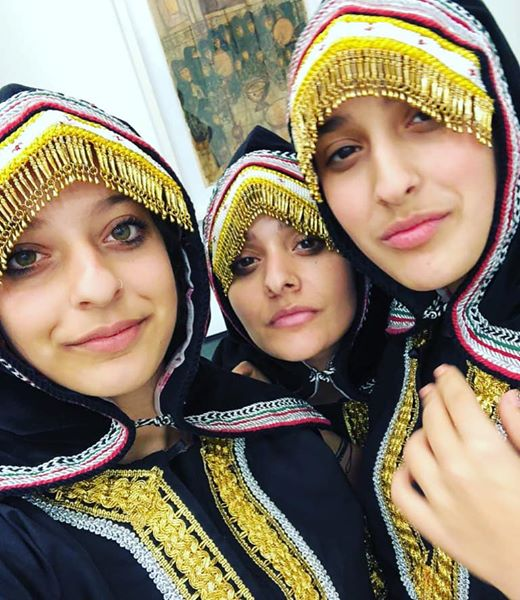
Traditional Yemenite attire for women

Jewish women in Yemen traditionally wore branched pantaloons beneath their long black tunics. The pantaloons were usually made of a jet-black color, tapering close to their ankles, and decorated at the lower seams with a fine embroidered stitch of silver. The tunic served as, both, a dress and long-sleeved blouse, all in one piece. In addition, all young girls wore a black, conical shaped hat upon their heads, which took the place of a scarf. These hats were called in the local vernacular, gargush, and were also decorated with an embroidered sash about its borders, besides being equipped with tapering flaps that extended down to the ears and to the nape of the neck. Older women in Sanaa would wear a broad veil-like scarf over their heads, called maswan, especially when going out in public places, and which was traditionally worn above the closer fitting scarves that covered their hair. All women were adorned with black slippers when walking in public places, and only very small girls would walk barefoot.

Jewish women and girls in Haydan a-sham (in the far northern districts of Yemen) did not make use of the gargush, but would wear a black scarf tied firmly to their foreheads, resembling a black band, along with the covering made by an additional scarf that covered the hair.

=== Culinary specialties ===
The Yemenite Jews are known for bringing to Israel certain culinary dishes, now popularly eaten by all ethnic-groups living in Israel, namely, the malawach (itself an adaptation of the Yemeni mulawah), and jachnun. Lesser-known breadstuffs include the kubaneh (a traditional Sabbath bread), luḥūḥ, sabayah, zalabiyeh, saj bread (referred to as saluf), and galub.

=== Yemenite Jewish surnames ===
The subject of Jewish surnames in Yemen is a complex one. Most surnames are gentilic or toponymic surnames, meaning, they are derived from the name of an ancestor's place of residence (the name of a town or village, such as Gadasi from al-Gades; Qa'taby from Qa'tabah; Manqadi from Manqadah; Damari from Dhamar, Damti from Damt, etc.), while fewer are eponymous or patronymic surnames, being derived from the name of an ancient ancestor. Some surnames reflect an ancestor's profession. In some cases, surnames are derived from a certain physical characteristic of one's distant ancestor. Some families bear original Spanish surnames, such as Medina and Giyyat. Some names went through additional changes upon emigration to Israel. For example, some who formerly bore the surname of Radha (Judeo-Arabic: רצ'א) have changed their surname to Ratzon (Hebrew: רצון), the Hebrew being the direct translation of the word's meaning in Arabic, while yet others have simply changed their names to a more Hebraicized sound, such as the surnames of Al-Nadaf (lit. a stuffer of cushions; carder of cotton), which was later changed to Nadav ("generous"), and 'Urqabi (so-named from a locality in Yemen) which was later changed to Argov; or Sheḥib (Judeo-Arabic: שחב), meaning "one whose voice is hoarse," which was changed to Shevach (Hebrew: שבח), meaning "praise," by a reversal of the last two letters.

==== Claimed family lineages ====
Some Jewish families have preserved traditions which are related to their tribal affiliations, based on partial genealogical records which have been passed down from generation to generation. In Yemen, for example, some Jews trace their lineage to Judah, others trace their lineage to Benjamin, and others trace their lineage to Levi and Reuben. Of particular interest is one distinguished Jewish family of Yemen, named Salah, which traced its lineage to Bani, one of the sons of Perez, the son of Judah.

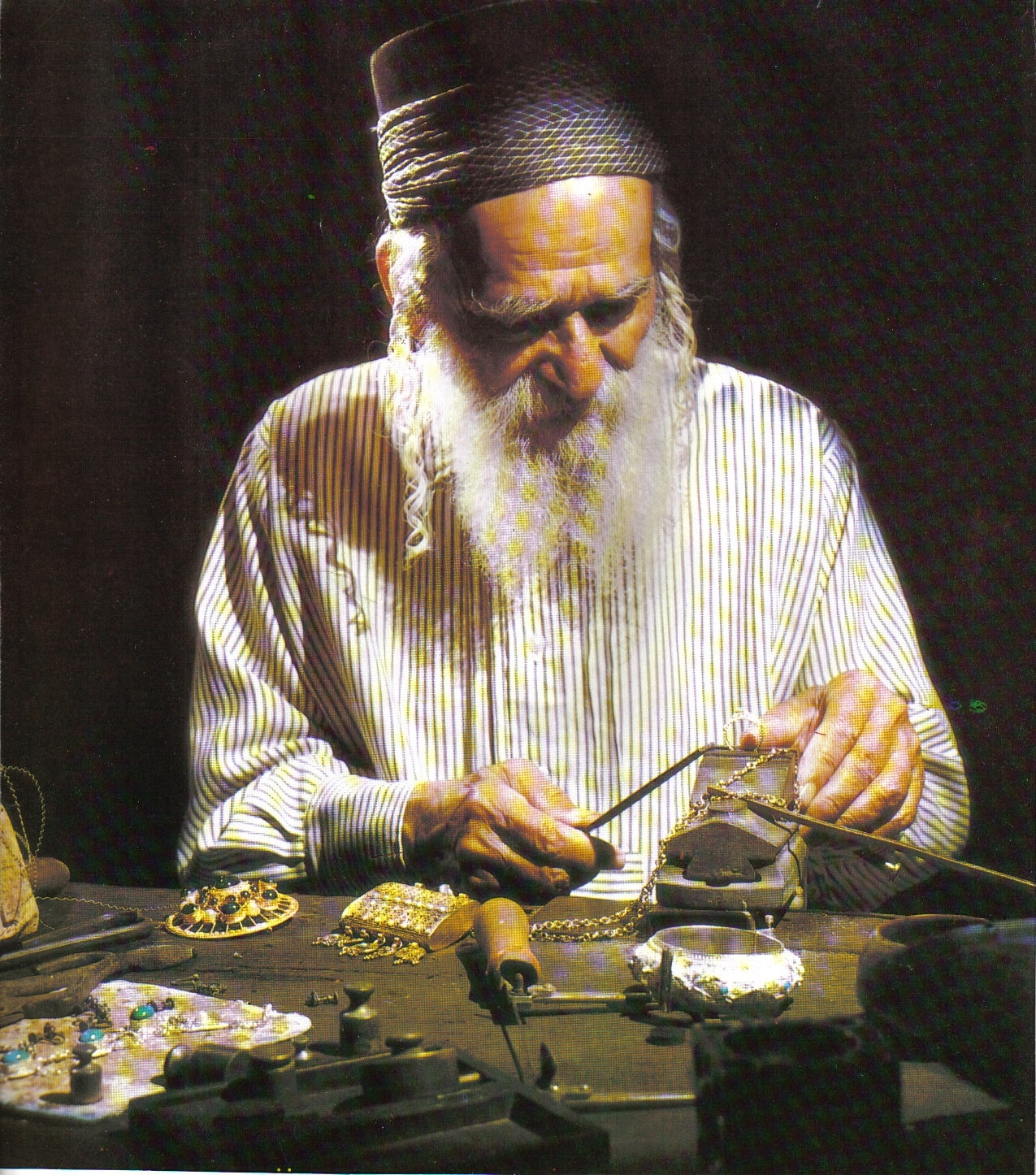
Silversmith, Yosef Salah (1888–1999)

=== Interaction with Israeli culture ===
Israeli Yemenite Jews were initially discouraged from practicing their culture by the dominant Ashkenazi majority, and the practice of using henna before weddings declined. Beginning around the late 1970s, discussions were held in honor of the ethnic heritage of Yemenite Jews and by 2018, a revival of some Yemenite customs occurred. The cathartic moment was an exhibition of a Yemeni bride which was shown at the Israel Museum in 1965.

==== Music ====
Yemeni Jews are predominant among Israeli performers of Mizrahi music. Yemenite singer Shoshana Damari is considered "The queen of Israeli music", and two of the most successful Israeli singers abroad, Ofra Haza and Achinoam Nini (Noa), are of Yemenite origin. At the Eurovision Song Contest, 1998, 1979, and 1978 winners Dana International, Gali Atari, and Izhar Cohen, 1983 runner-up Ofra Haza, and 2008 top 10 finalist Boaz Mauda, are Yemenite Jews. Harel Skaat, who competed at Oslo in 2010, is the son of a Yemenite Jewish father. Other Israeli singers and musicians of Yemenite Jewish descent include Zohar Argov, the three sisters of the music group A-WA (Yemenite Jewish father), Inbar Bakal, Mosh Ben-Ari, Yosefa Dahari, Daklon, Eyal Golan, Zion Golan, Yishai Levi, Sara Levi-Tanai (choreographer and songwriter), Bo'az Ma'uda, Avihu Medina, Boaz Sharabi, Pe'er Tasi, Shimi Tavori, Margalit Tzan'ani, and Tomer Yosef of Balkan Beat Box.

==== Israelis of Yemenite descent ====
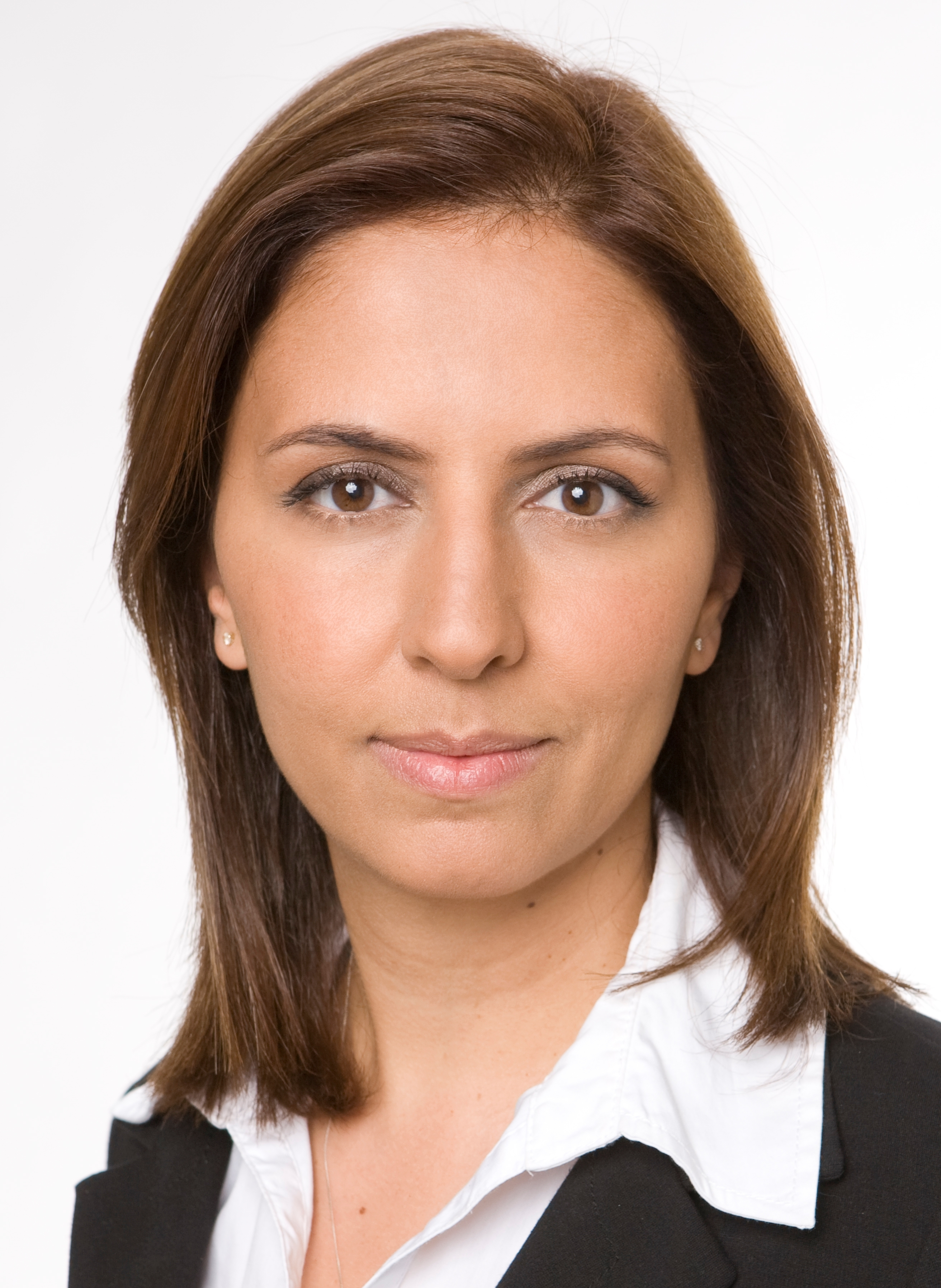
Gila Gamliel, member of the Knesset for the Likud Party and Minister in the Prime Minister's Office

===== Israeli soldiers of Yemenite descent =====
- Avigdor Kahalani
- David Maimon

===== Politics =====
Israeli Politicians of Yemenite Jewish descent include Gila Gamliel (current member of the Knesset for Likud), Meir Yitzhak Halevi (the Mayor of Eilat), Saadia Kobashi (leader of the Yemenite Jewish community in Israel, and one of the signatories of the country's declaration of independence), and Avraham Taviv.

===== Sports and media =====
Becky Griffin, whose mother is Yemenite Jewish, works as a model, TV presenter and actress. Shahar Tzuberi is an Olympic windsurfer. Linoy Ashram is an Israeli individual rhythmic gymnast. She is the 2020 Olympic All-around Champion. Sagi Muki is an Olympic champion judoka.

== Genetic studies ==
By autosomal DNA, Yemenite Jews are distinct from other Mizrahi Jewish groups, as they are close to the non-Jewish population of the Arabian Peninsula. According to Simon Schama, the Israeli geneticist Batsheva Bonne-Tamir established that the ancestry of Yemeni Jews goes back to south-Western Arabian and Bedouin conversions of the Himyarite period.

However, studies on uniparental haplogroups have indicated shared roots between Yemenite Jewish and members of the world's other various Jewish communities. Y chromosome haplogroups have shown a strong link to other Jewish groups, such as the European Ashkenazi and Middle Eastern Jews, and to non-Jewish Levantine populations, such as Palestinians and Samaritans. Yemenite Jews commonly carry West Asian mitochondrial DNA haplogroups that are found in other Jewish and Levantine groups but not in non-Jewish Yemenis, possibly suggesting ancient Israelite descent. What makes them stand out among Jewish populations is the presence of particular sub-Saharan African L haplogroups (L0a2c1a, L3c, L3x1a1, L4a1a) that are common among non-Jewish Yemenis but not in other Jewish groups, some of which have different branches of L and others of which have no presence of L. Nonetheless, compared to non-Jewish Yemenis, Yemenite Jews have a lower frequency and diversity of L haplotypes. It has been proposed that the L lineages might reflect admixture from a local non-Jewish source, whereas a 2011 study by Amy L. Non and others concluded that there is "little evidence for large-scale conversion of local Yemeni".

Yemenite Cohens are also part of the Extended Cohen Modal Haplotype.

In medicine, the mutation SAMD9 (sterile alpha motif domain containing 9), which encodes a protein involved in the regulation of extraosseous calcification, has been found to underlie normophosphatemic familial tumoral calcinosis in families of Jewish Yemenite origin.

== See also ==
- Jewish culture
- Jewish diaspora
- Jewish ethnic divisions
- Jewish customs of etiquette
- List of Jews from the Arab World
- Hadhrami Jews
- Habbani Jews
- Adeni Jews
- Arab Jews
- Maghrebi Jews
- Shara'bi Jews
- Mizrahi Jews
- Genetic history of the Middle East
- Genetic studies on Jews
- History of ancient Israel and Judah
- History of the Jews and Judaism in the Land of Israel
- Israelites
- Groups claiming affiliation with Israelites
- Twelve Tribes of Israel
- Ten Lost Tribes
- Jewish history
- History of the Jews in the Arabian Peninsula
- The Jewish community of Saada
- History of Yemen
- Israel–Yemen relations
- Human rights in Yemen
- Religion in Yemen
- Freedom of religion in Yemen
- History of the Jews under Muslim rule
- Antisemitism in Islam
- Antisemitism in the Arab world
- Racism in the Arab world
- Racism in Muslim communities
- Xenophobia and racism in the Middle East
- Islamic–Jewish relations
- Jewish exodus from the Muslim world
- Kfar Tapuach (Apple-village), an Orthodox Jewish Israeli settlement which is located in the west Bank and was founded by Yemenite Jews in 1978
- Torah scroll (Yemenite)
- Yemenite citron
- Yemenite Hebrew
- Yemenite Jewish poetry
- Yemenite Jewish silversmiths
- Mawza Exile
- Midrash HaGadol
- Nathan ben Abraham I
- Yemenite Children Affair
- Orphans' Decree
- Baladi-rite prayer
- Epistle to Yemen
- Al-Ousta Codex

== Bibliography ==
- Gavra, Moshe (2014). Surnames of Jews in Yemen (Shemot ha-mishpachah shel ha-yehudim ba-teiman) (in Hebrew). B'nei Brak: Ha-mekhon le-ḥeker ḥakhamei teiman. OCLC 892488824.
