= Dahari =

Dahari is a surname. Notable people with the surname include:

- Mokhtar Dahari (1953–1991), Malaysian footballer
- Yosefa Dahari (born 1971), Israeli singer
