= Yosefa Dahari =

Israeli singer

Yosefa Dahari יוספה דהרי
- Born: January 13, 1971 (age 55); Eilat, Israel
- Origin: Eilat, Israel
- Genres: Folk; house; electronic music; dance music
- Occupation: singer
- Label: Wordly Dance Music

Yosefa Lazen (born January 13, 1971, as Yosefa Dahari, Hebrew: יוספה דהרי) is an Israeli singer born of Yemeni-Jewish and Moroccan-Jewish parents. Her style blends world beat electronic dance music beats, rap and soul with traditional singing styles of Morocco and Yemen. She lives in Israel.

== Early life ==
Yosefa's parents introduced her to the music of the Middle East and North Africa when she was growing up. Her Jewish father was from Yemen, while her Jewish mother was from Morocco.

Dahari began singing during her Israeli military (IDF) service. Once, while stationed near the Lebanon border, she performed Arabic folk songs and received praise from the other side of the border. Such responses prompted her to pursue her Arabic musical roots, and after completing her military service, she became a professional singer.

== Music career ==
Her recordings include Middle Eastern instruments such as the kanun, oud, zourna, darbouka and tin drum, as well as European instruments. Her style has been characterized as following in the tradition of the late Yemeni-Israeli singer Ofra Haza. Most of her songs are in Hebrew, while she also sang in Maghrebi Arabic and English.

== Discography ==
- Yosefa (Trolika, 1993)
- The Desert Speaks (EMI Hemisphere, 1996)
- Lullaby Composed - Martin Kennedy (UK) Single (Unknown, about 1997)
