= Yihye Bashiri =

17th-century Yemenite Rabbi and scholar

- Died: 1661
- Occupation: Rabbi Professional Scrivener Sofer

Yihye Bashiri (Hebrew: יחיא בשירי), also spelt Yahya al-Bashiri (b. ? – d. 1661), known by his pen-name Avner bar Ner ha-Sharoni, and by the acronym Maharib (moreinu harav yihye bashiri), was a Yemenite Rabbi, professional scrivener and sofer of the Masoretic Text whose works of Hebrew manuscripts now account for many now stored in public libraries across the globe, including the Jewish Theological Seminary of America (Rab.1276; Rab. 36; Rab. 4550), Cambridge University Library (Add.1726, p. 1-a; Add. 3407), the Russian State Library (MS. Günzburg 869) and the Hebrew Union College-Jewish Institute of Religion (MS. 764), et al. Rabbi Yiḥyah Salaḥ coined him the epithet, "the great scribe of the Law." A man of uncommon piety, he is also known for an act of intervention on behalf of his community in Yemen, which brought miraculous deliverance to the Jews of Sana'a when they stood in danger of annihilation by the king, on account of libel and slander brought against them.

== Background ==
The son of Abraham ben Saadya al-Bashiri, Rabbi Yihye Bashiri lived with his family in the Yemeni territory of ar-Raḥabah near the village of al-Ḥema, a three-hour walking distance north of Sana’a. Although named Yiḥye at birth, the names Ḥayyim and Zechariah were also used by him as its proper Hebrew equivalents. Since printed books were very rare in Yemen, a gifted scribe was often employed as an amanuensis in transcribing important Hebrew literary works, but especially in supplying the community with prayerbooks and Torah codices. Many times, the one who ordered the book had special preferences in content, which accounts for the variants found in texts made by a single copyist. Thus, in the preface to the Tiklāl Qadmonim copied by the Yemenite scribe Shalom Qorah in 1938, he notes: "Be apprised that the Baladi-rite prayer books (Arabic plural: tikālil) of our teacher and Rabbi, Yihye Bashiri, may his merit rebound into the life of the world to come, are not at all identical, while some of them are found (on the most-part) based after the printed [Spanish] editions; the reason being that he was scribe and would write for everyone according to his preferences."

As early as 1618, he compiled his Tiklāl Bashiri, the Baladi-rite prayerbook in Babylonian supralinear punctuation, a copy of which was made in 1938 and published in facsimile under the name Tiklāl Qadmonim in 1964. In essence, the rendition used by him in this undertaking was largely based on Maimonides' version of the Jewish prayers, found in his Mishneh Torah, with the addition of other ancient material, such as the Aramaic Megillat Antiochus with a Judeo-Arabic translation. That same year (the 1929th year of the Seleucid era = 1618 CE), he also copied the collection of homilies on the Torah, known as Midrash HaGadol, in which he also shed light on its anonymous author, saying that it was first compiled by "Rabbi David b. Amram, of blessed memory, a man of the city of Aden, in the land of Yemen." In 1619, he copied the Mishnah, of which only Seder Zeraim has survived. The following year, in 1620, he would pen another Siddur, and in 1622 (1933 of the Seleucid era) he appended his name to the colophon of a Code of Legal Law which he finished copying that year from an older manuscript of Maimonides' Mishneh Torah.

In 1623, he wrote a "Taj" (Codex) containing the first five books of Moses, now in a private collection in Israel.

Rabbi Bashiri also made a handwritten copy of Nathan ben Jehiel's seminal work, the Arukh. Several works of kabbalah were copied by the scribe before 1630, including Rabbi Moses ben Jacob Cordovero's Ohr ha-Yakar ("A Precious Light") and Ohr Neerav ("A Pleasant Light"). Rabbi Yiḥyah Salaḥ (Maharitz) frequently makes mention of him in his writings, especially in what concerns orthography. The Pentateuch codices penned by Rabbi Yihye Bashiri were considered authoritative by the Yemenite Jews, as far as their accuracy touching the Masoretic Text is concerned, and his younger rabbinic votaries who came after him have given to his work the honorific title "the Masorah of Rabbi Yihye Bashiri".

The texts of old Yemenite Siddurs copied by Bashiri are an invaluable source for comparing the variae lectiones (Textual variations) of liturgy before the redaction of the Babylonian Talmud. For example, in all older Yemenite Siddurs copied by Bashiri is found the version גואל ישראל "He who redeems Israel" in the second blessing after Shema Yisrael and on the night of Passover, that is, in the present-progressive tense instead of in the past tense (גאל ישראל), although the requirement made by Rava in the Talmud (Pesaḥim 117b; Berakhoth 14a) calls for saying it in the past tense. Scholars point out that the Yemenite practice was the original custom in Yemen before Rava's interdict.

=== Enactment concerning Ketubbah ===
In the Yemenite ketubbah – aside from the principal obligation of 200 silver pieces for a virgin (504 grammes of fine silver), and 100 silver pieces (252 grammes of fine silver) for a widow or divorced woman – there was written a unique clause: "Now this nedunya (largess; dowry) which she brought into him [upon wedlock] is valued at one-hundred silver-[alloyed] qaflas. All has been received by this bridegroom, and has come into his hand, and has become his possession, and he has incurred every-thing upon himself as it were a loan [given unto him], and a debt."

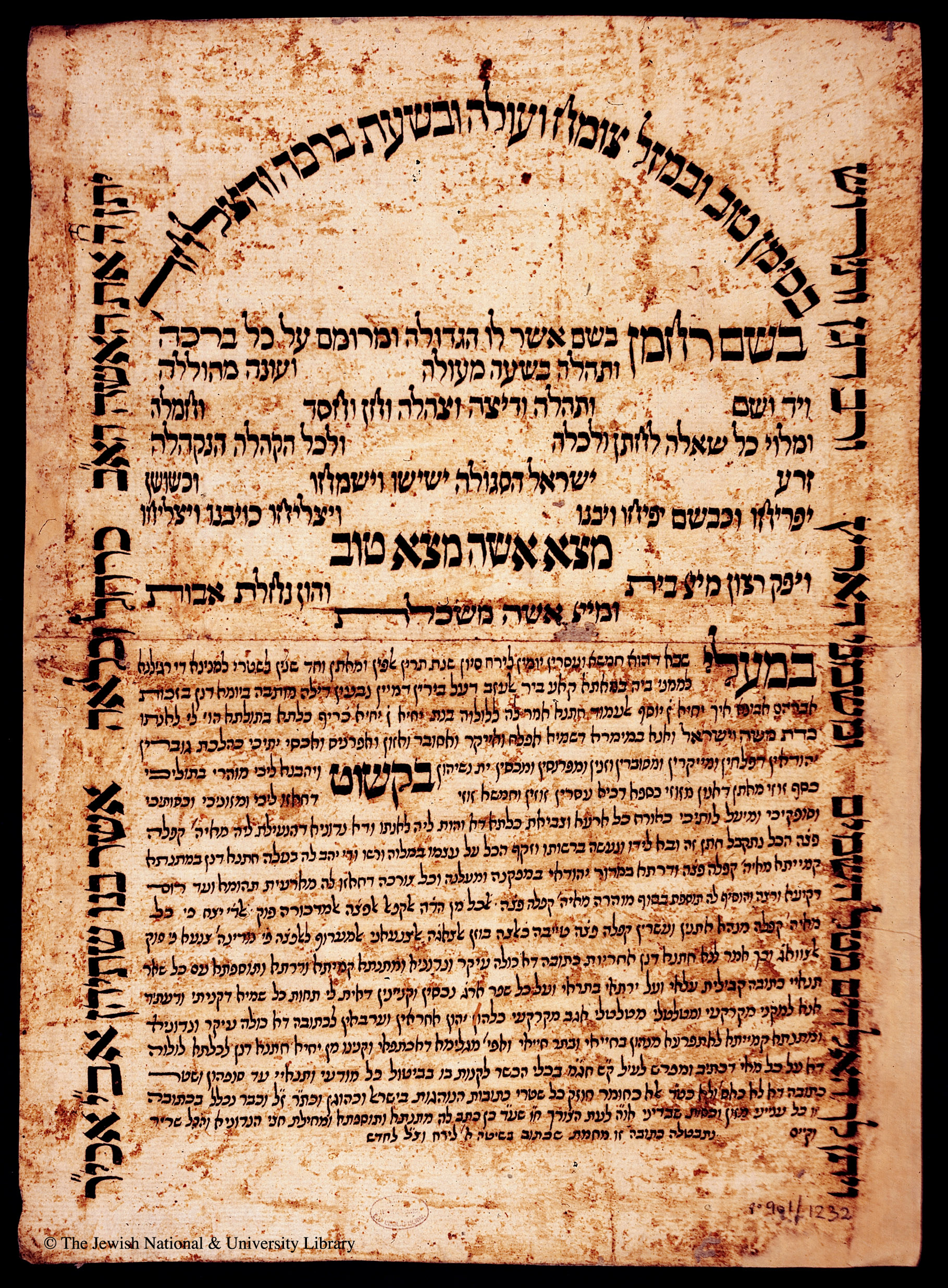
Ketubbah from Sana'a Yemen, dated 2201 of Seleucid era (1890 CE)

The nedunya, or what is often translated as 'the bride's outfit' (trousseau), is more effectually translated as 'largess,' or 'dowry,' since it is traditionally bestowed upon a man's daughter by her father before she marries (such as jewellery, clothing, household items, etc.), and she brings the same items and their value into the marriage, over which things her husband takes full responsibility, although they are deemed as merely a loan unto him; meaning, he is able to freely make use of them while married to her, but must return them unto her father in the event of his wife's early death. In Yemen, the standard value of a woman's nedunya was written in her ketubba as being "one-hundred qaflas" (the qaflah being a unit of weight that was equal to a dirham of about 3.0 – 3.36 grammes). If the woman's father were a liberal man, he would not demand the return of such items.

One of the enactments made in Sana'a in 1646, at the direction and insistence of Rabbi Yihye Bashiri, was to amend the Ketubbah (marriage contract) so that the value listed as his wife's nedunya, as well as all financial obligations pledged by the husband to his wife, such as the tosefet (additional jointure), be exacted in the local currency of the state with its adjustment, namely, its real value, rather than merely by what was signified as its nominal value based on the fixed sum of money of "one-hundred silver-[alloyed] qaflas" written in the ketubba. The practical bearing thereof is that the nedunya, or any additional gift vouchsafed by the husband to his bride, at the time of exaction there is to be taken into consideration that for every 100 alloyed qaflas of the local currency there were only twenty-two qaflas of a pure and unalloyed silver content. The earlier version of the Yemenite ketubbah read, "All consists of those silver-[alloyed] qaflas mentioned above, which in every ten of which qaflas of those calculated are three qaflahs [of pure and unalloyed silver], minus a quarter of a silver qaflah," and which, by 1646, was outdated.

== Blood libel ==
The Jews of Yemen have preserved a story relating to the community's deliverance in the mid-17th century. Some have doubted the historicity of these events, while others have avowed them to be true. The following story is said to have involved Rabbi Yihye Bashiri.

During the reign of the Zaydi Muslim monarch of Sana'a, Imam Al-Mu'ayyad Muhammad, known to all by his kunya, "Abu 'l-Qasim", the Jews of the city stood in danger of extermination, which was occasioned by the following: Certain of the king's non-Jewish subjects had accused the people of Israel over the death of one of the king's sons, when, in fact, the Jews' accusers had taken the king's son to a secluded place and murdered him, and then dumped his body in the street belonging to the Jews. The youth was sought after, and when his dead body was found, they brought his body to the king, whereupon, this accusation they brought before the king, saying: "Did we not tell you that the Jews take a gentile each year, by stealth, and slaughter him! And that very blood they will take and distribute amongst themselves, drop by drop, to be kneaded with their unleavened bread," among other calumnious words.

The king, at hearing this, shouted in anguish to his servants, "Quickly! Gather together all the Jews at this place! I will be avenged by their blood! I shall not be appeased until I have utterly consumed them and their memorial from this earth! By my life, I shall not pity, neither shall I take mercy, but shall do away with them!"

The Jews of the city were then gathered together in haste, in the midst of that place called the Maidan, both men, women and children. The king addressed them, saying: "If you presently, at this time, tell me who killed my son, all will be well. But if not, you shall not go unpunished by me!" They answered him, "Our lord, the king. Give us time." He replied, "I shall give you until tomorrow, but only I would that you sleep here, in close proximity to my dead son."

They sent from their numbers an emissary to the town al-Ḥema, to summon urgently Rabbi Yihye Bashiri. On the morrow, before the break of dawn, Rabbi Yihye Bashiri rose-up to go into Sana'a, as he had been bidden to do. When he came before the king, he said to him: "My lord, the king. Swear unto me by your life, and by the duration of your kingdom, that you shall acquit Israel of all guilt in this case, if your son shall rise up alive once again, in the presence of all the people, and shall declare with his own mouth who it was that killed him, so that you will be avenged of him." When the king agreed to this condition, Rabbi Bashiri is said to have stood-up in prayer before his God, and said: "Lord of the Universe, the God of Abraham, Isaac and Israel, in whose hand are the souls of all the living, and the spirit of every man's flesh, today let it be known that you are God, and that there is none like unto you!" And with many like words of supplication, he asked God's intervention, concluding with the words: "Let your name be sanctified in the eyes of the nations, so that they might know that there is a God amongst your people Israel, and that you are the truth, and that your Law is the truth, and that Moses your prophet is the truth, and that your signet is truth! Moreover, that you have chosen your people Israel in truth, for you are a God of truth, and your word is truth forever! Blessed be you O Lord, who hears prayer!" At these final words, he wrote the word 'TRUTH' on a piece of paper (the Hebrew being symbolized by three letters: Aleph, Mim and Tau = אמת), and laid it to the forehead of the slain youth. Forthwith, the dead youth stood upon his feet, just as he was before, with spirit and breath and a speaking voice. And when the king saw him, he approached him and held his hand. The Rabbi then asked him, "What is your name?" He said to him, "Abdul Raḥman." He then asked him, "Whose son are you?" He said to him, "The son of the Imam, Abu-al-Qasim." He then asked him, "And where is your father?" He said to him, "Behold! He is holding my hand." He then asked him, "And what is your situation right now?" He said to him, "I am slain." He then asked him, "Who is it that killed you?" He said to him, "So and so, and so and so, and they are the good friends of my father." He then asked him, "In which place did this happen?" He said to him, "In such and such a house, in such and such a room. And the blood is still freshly imbrued upon the stones."

The king then sent unto that house and unto that room in order to make an inquiry there and they found as it was described unto him. The Rabbi then stood up and erased the letter Aleph from the word 'TRUTH', and there was left only the letters, Mim and Tau (which two letters when read consecutively have the meaning of "dead"), and he fell back to the ground, returning to his former state.

The king, being filled with compassion for his son, said to the Rabbi: "I will give to you much silver that my son might stay alive!" Rabbi Yihye Bashiri, however, said to him: "It is impossible for it to be so! That is, to change the natural course of things and to make void the decree of the King who reigns over kings of kings, the Most Holy, blessed be He. Rather, these things happened only to show unto man his great powers, and that the blood of the souls of innocent men might not be laid to your charge." Forthwith, the king commanded to bury his son. Yet, before he was buried, he sent to kill those who had killed his son, with their wives and sons, and small children, and to make a full extermination of them from the face of the earth. They also burnt down their houses and left of them no remnant. He then sent away the Rabbi and all of Israel peaceably to their dwelling-places.

== Literary works ==
- Ḥavatselet ha-Sharon (Hebrew: חבצלת השרון), being a treatise on the shapes of the Hebrew letters written in the Torah scroll, crownlets (tagim), orthography and other kabbalistic matters. (By his own admission, this work was written by him when he was aged nineteen).
- Even ha-Sharon (Hebrew: אבן השרון), being a commentary on Talmudic aggadah in Ein Yaakov, of which only the orders of Moed and Nashim have survived.
- Commentary of the Passover Haggadah (Hebrew: פירוש לאגדתא דפסחא), written in Judeo-Arabic, and contained in a Tiklāl (prayer book) of his own writing.
- The Gleanings (Hebrew: הלקט), being a commentary on the Torah (novellæ, numerical values of words, etc.)
- Amirat Ha-Emunot (Hebrew: אמירת האמונות), being a commentary on Ein Yaakov, Seder Moed.
- Chronicle of the Expulsion of the Turks from Yemen (events relating to the al-Qasimi rebellion against the Ottoman Turks in Yemen during the 1620s)
- Ein Mishpaṭ (Hebrew: עין משפט), written in the glosses of the Midrash HaGadol, being a reference guide for the sources quoted in the book, in which he draws primarily on Maimonides, Sifra, Sifrei, the Mishnah and the Talmud.

== Selected manuscripts in public libraries ==
- Tiklal, at the Jewish Theological Seminary of New York, MS. 4550.
- Tiklal (compiled in 1653), at National Library of Israel, MS. 4°1420 (microfilm # B-314)
- Tiklal (compiled in 1654), at Hebrew Union College in Cincinnati, MS. 764
- Mishnah, with Commentary of Obadiah of Bartenura, at Hamburg State and University Library (Staats und Universitaetsbibliothek Hamburg), Germany, MS. Levy 40
- Midrash HaGadol on the Book of Numbers, at National Library of Israel, MS. Heb. 4°7121 (microfilm # F-40882)
- Maimonides' Judeo-Arabic Commentary on the Mishnah, Seder Zera‘im and Moed, at the Jewish Theological Seminary of New York, MS. JTS 5862; JTS Rab. 36; JTS Acc. 558
- Midrash HaGadol, on the Book of Deuteronomy, at Russian State Library in Moscow, MS. Guenzburg 869
- Midrash HaGadol, on the Book of Numbers (compiled in 1656), at Cambridge University Library, Add. 3407
- Commentary on Maimonides' list of the 613 biblical commands, at Cambridge University Library, Add. 1726, p. 1a
