= Baladi-rite prayer =

Jewish prayer ritual

The Baladi-rite Prayer is the oldest known prayer rite used by Yemenite Jews. A siddur is known as a tiklāl (Judeo-Yemeni Arabic: תכלאל, plural תכאלל tikālil) in Yemenite Jewish parlance. "Baladi", a term applied to the prayer rite, was not used until prayer books arrived in Yemen in the Sephardic rite.

The Baladi version that is used today is not the original Yemenite version that had been in use by all of Yemen's Jewry until the end of the 16th century and the beginning of the 17th, but has now evolved with various additions under the influence of Sephardi siddurs and the rulings passed down in the Shulchan Aruch. In the middle of the 18th century, Yiḥyah Salaḥ tried unsuccessfully to create a unified Baladi-rite prayerbook, since he devised a fusion between the ancient Yemenite form and Sephardic prayer forms that had already integrated into Yemenite Jewish prayers a hundred years or so years before that.

The Baladi-rite tiklāl contains the prayers used for the entire year and the format prescribed for the various blessings (benedictions) recited. Older Baladi-rite tikālil were traditionally compiled in the supralinear Babylonian vocalization, although today, all have transformed and strictly make use of the Tiberian vocalization. The text, however, follows the traditional Yemenite punctuation of Hebrew.

== First printing ==
The Baladi-rite tiklāl remained in manuscript form until 1894, when the first printed edition (editio princeps) was published in Jerusalem by the Yemenite Jewish community, which included the ʿEtz Ḥayyim commentary written by Yiḥya Salaḥ. Today, it is used primarily by the Baladi-rite congregations of Yemenite Jews in Israel and the Jewish diaspora. Baladi is an Arabic word denoting "of local use", as distinguished from the rite widely used in the northern Arab-speaking world, which is called in Arabic Shāmī "Levantine".

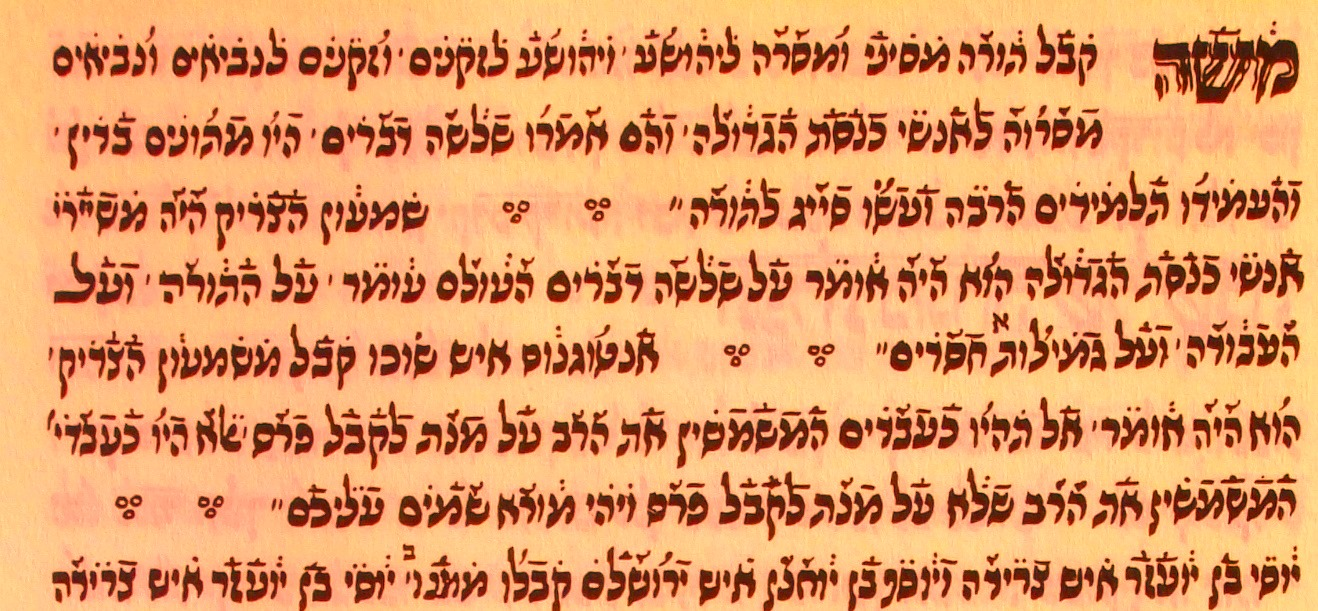
Section of the "Pirkei Avot" section of a Yemeni tiklāl with Babylonian vocalization)

== Comparison with the Sephardic prayer rite ==
The Baladi-rite prayer differs in many aspects from the Sephardic rite prayer, or what was known locally as the Shāmī-rite prayer book, which by the 18th and 19th centuries was already widely used in Yemen, although only lately introduced into Yemen by Jewish travelers. Their predilection for books composed in the Land of Israel made them neglect their own hand-written manuscripts, though they were of a more exquisite and ancient origin.

The nineteenth century Jewish historiographer Hayyim Habshush gave some insights into the conflict that arose in the Jewish community of Sana'a on account of the newer Sephardic prayer book being introduced there. Yiḥya, the son of one of the community's most respectable leaders, Shalom ben Aharon HaKohen al-Iraqi (known as al-'Usṭā - "the artisan"), whose father served under two Zaydi Imams between the years 1733–1761 as the surveyor general of public buildings, had tried to make the Sephardic prayer book the standard prayer-rite of all Jews in Yemen in the 18th century. This caused a schism in the Jewish community of Sana'a, with the more zealous choosing to remain faithful to their fathers' custom (i.e. the Baladi-rite) and to continue its perpetuation since it was seen as embodying the original customs practised by Yemenite Jews. Of twenty-two synagogues in Sana'a, only three in the city chose to remain with the original Baladi-rite prayer. The others adopted the Sefardic rite tefilla introduced by Isaac Luria. By the time of the Jewish community's demise, owing to mass immigration in the mid-20th century, most synagogues in Sana'a had already returned to praying in the Baladi-rite, albeit, in the vast majority of towns and villages across Yemen they clung to their adopted Sephardic-rite as found in the printed books of Venice, Thessaloniki, Amsterdam and, especially, the Tefillath Haḥodesh and Zekhor le-Avraham tikālil printed in Livorno.

According to Yiḥyah Qafiḥ (1850–1931), a Chief Rabbi of Yemen, the original Yemenite version of the Amidah is the format that was prescribed by the Great Assembly (Hebrew: אנשי כנסת הגדולה), who enacted the prayer in the fourth century BCE, with the one exception of the Benediction said against sectarians, which was enacted many years later. Yiḥyah Salaḥ (1713–1805) wrote an extensive commentary on the Baladi-rite Prayer Book in which he mostly upholds the old practices described therein (e.g. the practice of saying only one Mussaf-prayer during Rosh Hashanah, etc.), although he also compromises by introducing elements in the Yemenite tiklāl taken from the books of the Kabbalists and the Shulchan Aruch, which had already become popular in Yemen. At first, Salaḥ was inclined to follow the Shami-custom, but afterwards retracted and sought to uphold the original Yemeni custom. He is often seen praising the old Yemenite customs and encouraging their continued observance:

I have also with me a responsum concerning the matter of changing our prayer custom which is in the Tikālil (Baladi-rite Prayer Books) in favor of the version found in the Spanish-rite Prayer Books, from the Rabbi, [even] our teacher, Rabbi Pinḥas Ha-Kohen Iraqi, ... and he has been most vociferous in his language against those who would change [their custom], with reproofs and [harsh] decrees in a language that isn't very cajoling. May his soul be laid up in paradise.

Cover page of Tiklāl Bashiri, copied in Yemen in 1938

== Textual development ==
Dr. Moshe Gavra, who examined more than 700 Yemenite tikālil, has concluded that there have always existed differences between those used in Yemen, just as there exist differences between various Sephardic tefillot and Ashkenazi siddurim. While the ancient format of the Amidah may have seen little changes since its enactment by the latter prophets, the history of the Yemenite Baladi-rite tiklāl—as can be said about every prayer book—is a history of recensions and later interpolations, with the addition of elements taken from the Siddur of Saadia Gaon and of Amram Gaon, the printed Sephardic tefillot, as well as elements taken from liturgies found originally in Palestine. Most of these changes began to make their way into the current Baladi-rite tiklāl over a two-hundred year period, from the time of Yiḥya Bashiri (d. 1661) who published his Tiklāl Bashiri in 1618 (a copy of which was made and published under the name Tiklāl Qadmonim) to the time of Yiḥyah Salaḥ (d. 1805), the latter of whom incorporating in the Baladi-rite version elements taken from Kabbalah, as prescribed by Isaac Luria as well as certain liturgical poems taken from the Sephardic prayer books. In the title page of one Yemenite tiklāl completed in 1663 by the notable scribe and kabbalist, Isaac ben Abraham Wannah, the copyist makes a note of the fact that, aside from the regular customs of the people of Yemen, some of the entries in his tiklāl have been culled "from the customs of the people of Spain who have it as their practice to add in the prayers the Tikūn Ha-geshem and the Tikūn Ha-ṭal (special emendations made for rain and for dew so that they may not be withheld), as well as the Tikūnei Shabbat Malkah as is practised by the people of the Land of Israel,", i.e., the Psalms readings beginning with לכו נרננה, etc., and Lekha Dodi, followed by בר יוחאי, and יגדל אלהים חי. Originally, the practice was to begin the Sabbath prayer on the night of the Sabbath by reciting only “mizmor shir leyom ha-shabbath” (Ps. 92). The first recorded mentioning of Tikūn ha-ṭal (said before the Mussaf-prayer on the first day of Passover) in any extant Yemenite tikālil appeared only in 1583. Included in the Tikūnei Shabbat book were the special readings for the nights of Shavuot and Hoshanna Rabbah.

The texts of old Yemenite tikālil copied by Yihye Bashiri are an invaluable source for comparing the variae lectiones (Textual variations) of liturgy before the redaction of the Babylonian Talmud. For example, in all older Yemenite tikālil copied by Bashiri is found the version גואל ישראל (He who redeems Israel) in the second blessing after Qiryat Shema in the evening prayer and on the night of Passover, that is, in the present-progressive tense instead of in the past tense (גאל ישראל), although the requirement made by Rava in the Talmud (Pesaḥim 117b) calls for saying it in the past tense. Scholars point out that the Yemenite practice was the original custom in Yemen before Rava's interdict, the memorial of which also being brought down in the Jerusalem Talmud.

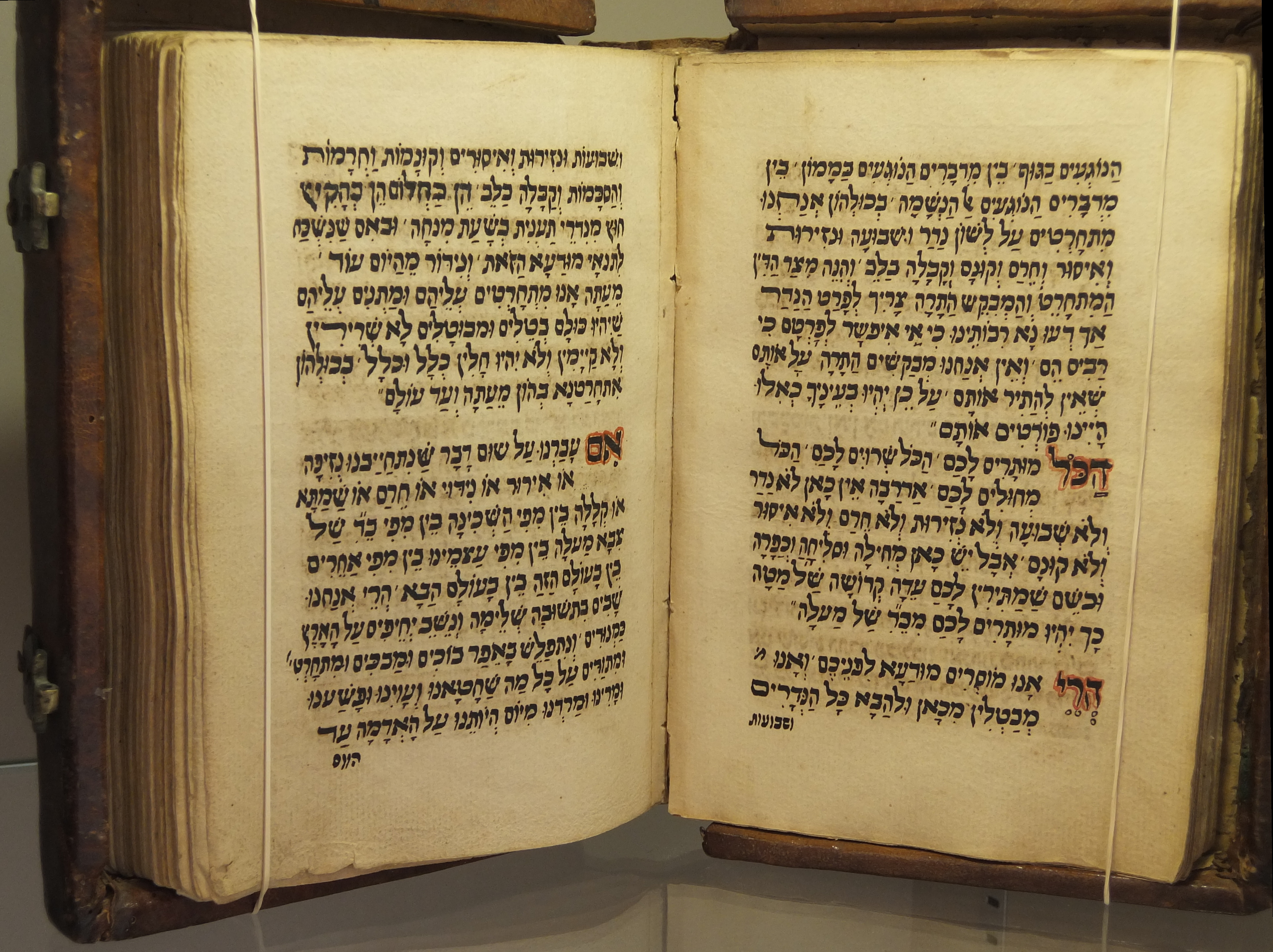
Prayer book written in Yemen showing Sephardic influence

=== Changes to the original Yemenite text ===
Among the later changes made to the text of the Baladi-rite tiklāl is the wording Kether Yitenu (כתֿר יתנו), etc., said during the Ḳeddushah (i.e. the third benediction in the prayer itself) at the time of the Mussaf prayer, as is the custom of Spain (Sepharad) with only minor variations. In spite of its wide acceptance in Yemen, among both Baladi and Shāmī congregations, Yiḥyah Qafiḥ (d. 1932) did not accept this innovation, but rather ordained in his place of study to continue to say Naqdishakh (נקדישך) in all of the prayers, just as had been their accepted tradition from the Great Assembly. The Yemenite adaptation of saying Kether during the Mussaf—although not mentioned in the Order of Prayers prescribed by Maimonides—is largely due to the influence of Amram Gaon's Siddur, which mentions the custom of the two Academies in Babylonia during the days of Natronai ben Hilai to say it during the third benediction of the 'Standing Prayer.' The practice of saying Kether during the Mussaf is also mentioned in the Zohar ("Parashat Pinḥas").

Notable changes occurring in the Baladi-rite tiklāl during the geonic period are the additions of Adon ha-ʿolamim (אדון העולמים), which mark the opening words in the Baladi-rite tiklāl before the Morning benediction, and the praise which appears further on and known as Barukh shʾamar (ברוך שאמר), which appears immediately following a short praise composed by Judah Halevi, Ha-mehulal le'olam (המהולל לעולם) and which is said before the recital of the selected Psalms (zemirot). These, among other innovations, have long since been an integral part of the Baladi-rite tiklāl.

In subsequent generations, other additions have been added thereto, such as the Yotzer verses that are said on the Sabbath day (i.e. those verses which mention the creation, hence: yotzer = "who createth"); and the last blessing made in the recital of Ḳiryat Shĕma (i.e. the second blessing thereafter) on the Sabbath evening, since in the original prayer text there was no difference between Sabbaths and weekdays; Likewise, the modern practice is to chant the prosaic Song of the Sea (שירת הים) before one recites Yishtabaḥ, although in the original Baladi-rite prayer the song came after Yishtabaḥ, seeing that it is not one of the songs of David. In today's Baladi-rite tiklāl, an interpolation of eighteen verses known as Rafa'eini Adonai we'erafei (רפאיני יי' וארפא) has been inserted between the prosaic Song of the Sea and Yishtabaḥ, just as it appears in the Tiklāl Mashta, compiled by Shalom Shabazi in 1655, although the same verses do not appear in the Tiklāl Bashiri compiled in 1618. Another custom which has found its way into the Yemenite tiklāl is the practice of rescinding all vows and oaths on the eve of Yom Kippur (Kol Nidre).

Moreover, in the older handwritten Baladi-rite tikālil, in the first blessing following the Ḳiryat Shĕma, or what is called in Hebrew: אמת ויציב = emeth wayaṣiv, the original Yemenite custom was to say only eight waws in the opening lines of the blessing, just as the blessing appears in Maimonides' Seder Ha-Tefillah (Order of Prayer), and not as it is now commonly practised to insert seven additional waws in the blessing for a total of fifteen. These changes, like the others, are directly related to the dissemination of Sephardic tefillot in Yemen, and influenced, especially, by the writings of David Abudirham.

==== Lurianic Kabbalah ====
No doubt the greatest changes to the Baladi-rite tiklāl have come in wake of kabbalistic practices espoused by Isaac Luria, which have since been incorporated in the Yemenite tiklāl. The proclamation "Adonai melekh, Adonai malakh, Adonai yimlokh le'olam wa'ed" said by some each day before Barukh shĕ'amar is from the teachings of Isaac Luria. The saying of Aleinu le'shebeaḥ (Heb. עלינו לשבח "It is for us to praise the Lord of all things", etc.) at the conclusion of the prayer, although originally said only during the Mussaf-prayer on Rosh Hashanah, is also an enactment made by Isaac Luria, Moshe ben Machir and Meir ben Ezekiel ibn Gabbai.

==== Shulchan Aruch ====
The Shulchan Aruch has also left an indelible mark upon the Baladi-rite prayer in certain areas. Yiḥyah Salaḥ (1713–1805) mentions that the old-timers in Yemen were not accustomed to reciting Mizmor le'Todah (i.e. Psalm 100) in the Pesukei dezimra of the Morning Prayer (Shahrith), although it too soon became the norm in the Baladi-rite congregations, based on a teaching in the Shulchan Aruch (Orach Chaim § 51:9) and Joseph Karo's specification that it be cited in the Morning Prayer. Yiḥyah Salaḥ agreed to insert it in his Baladi-rite tiklāl, saying that it was deemed just and right to recite it, seeing that “there is in it a plethora of praise unto Him, the Blessed One.”

Yiḥyah Salaḥ also initiated the custom of saying Ṣidqathekha (צדקתך), etc., in his own synagogue immediately following the Amidah of the Afternoon Prayer (Mincha) on Sabbath days, in accordance with an injunction in the Shulchan Aruch (Orach Chaim § 292:2), and which practice soon spread amongst other Baladi-rite congregations.

The Shulchan Aruch, with Yiḥyah Salaḥ's endorsement of certain Halachic rulings, was also the cause for other Baladi-rite customs being cancelled altogether, such as the old Yemenite Jewish custom of saying a final blessing after eating the "karpas" (in Yemenite tradition, "parsley") on the night of Passover; and of saying a final blessing over the second cup of wine drunk on the night of Passover; and of making a distinction between the number of matzot that are to be taken up during the blessing when Passover falls on a Sabbath day, as opposed to when it falls on a regular day of the week; and the custom to drink a fifth cup of wine during the Passover Seder. Yiḥyah Salaḥ also changed the original Baladi-rite practice of gesticulating the lulav (the palm frond and its subsidiaries, viz. the myrtle and willow branches in one's right hand, and the citron fruit in one's left), enacting that instead of the traditional manner of moving them forward, bringing them back, raising them up, and lowering them down, while in each movement he rattles the tip of the lulav three times, they would henceforth add another two cardinal directions, namely, to one's right and to one's left, as described in the Shulchan Arukh (Orach Chaim § 651:9). Not all changes in the tiklāl, however, were the result of Yiḥyah Salaḥ's own decision to force change in his community, but rather Yiḥyah Salaḥ chose to incorporate some of the Sefardic rites and liturgies in the Baladi-rite tiklāl since these same practices had already become popular in Yemen. One such practice was to begin the night of each Yom Tov (festival day) with the mizmor related to that particular holiday, although, originally, it was not a custom to do so, but only to begin the first night of each of the three Festival days by saying three mizmorim taken from Psalms 1, 2 and 150. The practice found its way into the Yemenite rite from the Sefardic prayer books, whereas now the Yemenite custom incorporates both traditions.

== Maimonides' influence ==
To what extent Maimonides’ writings actually influenced the development of the Yemenite prayer ritual is disputed by scholars. Some suggest that since the Baladi-rite prayer is almost identical to the prayer format brought down by Maimonides (1138-1204) in his Mishneh Torah that it is merely a copy of Maimonides’ arrangement in prayer. This view, however, is rejected by Yosef Qafih (1917–2000) and by Avraham Al-Naddaf (1866–1940). According to Yosef Qafih, the elders of Yemen preserved a tradition that the textual variant used by Maimonides in his Mishneh Torah was copied down from the texts presented to him by the Jews of Yemen, knowing that they had preserved the ancient format of the prayers, with as few innovations as possible. Elsewhere, in the preface to the Yemenite Baladi-rite tiklāl, Siyaḥ Yerushalayim, Qafiḥ writes that Maimonides searched for the most accurate prayer rite and found the Yemenite version to be the most accurate. According to al-Naddaf, when the prayers established by Ezra and the Great Assembly reached Yemen, the community there accepted them and forsook those prayers that they had formerly been accustomed to from the time of the Temple in Jerusalem. In subsequent generations, both, in the Land of Israel and in Babylonia, the rabbinic scholars of Israel made additional innovations by adding texts and liturgies to the prayer format established by Ezra were accepted by the Yemenites, such as Nishmath kol ḥai and the Song of the Sea, as established by Shimon bar Yochai. Later, penitential verses written by Saadia Gaon, Judah Halevi and Abraham ibn Ezra were incorporated in their tikālil. Eventually, when Maimonides came along and arranged the prayers in his Code of Jewish law, the Jews of Yemen saw that his words were in agreement with what they had in their tikālil, wherefore, they received him as a rabbi over them, although Maimonides had only written the format that he received from the Men of the Great Assembly, and that it happens to be the original version practised formerly by the Jews of Spain.

Al-Naddaf's view that the Yemenites possessed a version of the prayer before Maimonides' edition reached them is corroborated by an ancient Jewish source contemporaneous with Maimonides’ Mishneh Torah, in which Jewish scholars in Yemen had debated on how to arrange the second blessing after the Shema during ʿAravit. The source was copied down by Yiḥyah Salaḥ from the glosses of the Baladi-rite tiklāl written by Yihye Bashiri (d. 1661), and who, in turn, copied it from the work of a Yemenite Jewish scholar, entitled Epistle: Garden of Flowers (רסאלה' בסתאן אלאזהאר), in which he wrote the following:

Now what you have mentioned to us about the great geon, [even] our teacher and our Rabbi, Moses [Maimonides] (may his God keep him), how that by his magnanimity [he enjoins us] to say, Borukh shomer 'amo yisroel (Blessed be He who guards His people Israel ברוך שומר עמו ישראל), it is most correct what has been transmitted unto him. Who is it that knows to do such a thing, save that man whom the spirit of the holy God is within him? For the Rabbis have spoken of only two blessings coming after it (i.e. after Ḳiryath Shema), but not three! Now, as for us, concerning our composition of the order of prayers, and its arrangement and its custom which was written in the language of our Sages and used by some of the students, we have asked this question during our debates on the aforesaid composition, and we were indecisive about it due to its ambiguity, but we arranged the verses after Hashkiveinu (Hebrew: הַשְׁכִּיבֵנוּ) in such a way that they do not conclude after them with a blessing employing God's name, and forthwith will we stand up in prayer. After your letter reached us, teaching us about its proper application, we returned to its proper application! We succeeded in our composition to write the verses in such a way as to be identical with that which was written by him! Even so, his words seem to be even more exact than our own, proof of which is shown by what is written in Tractate Berakhoth: Mar says he reads [the verses of] Qiryath Shema and prays. This supports what was said by Rabbi Yohanan, ‘Who is he that is a son of the world to come? He who juxtaposes the word, Geulah, in the Evening Prayer with the actual Amidah itself!’ Moreover, they have said: Although one must say Hashkiveinu (Cause us to lie down in peace, etc.) between Geulah and the standing prayer itself, this does not constitute a break in continuity. For since the Rabbis enacted the saying of Hashkiveinu (Cause us to lie down in peace, etc.) in that part of the benediction which comes directly after Geulah, it is as if the benediction of Geulah was protracted! Now had it been like our words, he should have rather said: Although the Rabbis enacted Hashkiveinu and certain verses which come after it, [etc]. But since he did not say this, except only Haskiveinu, learn from it that at the end he concludes [with a blessing employing God's name]! Now this blessing is as one continuous thing, and not two things.

Based on this testimony, it is evident that the Talmud and Maimonides’ siddur in the Mishneh Torah have been used together to establish the final textual form of the Baladi-rite prayer commonly used in Yemen. Before Maimonides, the general trend in Yemen was to follow the halakhic rulings of the geonim, including their format used in the blessings. Saʻid ibn Dawud al-ʻAdani, in a commentary he wrote on Maimonides' Mishneh Torah (ca. 1420–82), writes of the final blessing said over wine: "What is found in the writings of most of the geonim is to conclude the blessing after drinking the fruit of the vine by saying, ['Blessed art Thou, O Lord], for the vine and the fruit of the vine,' and thus is it found written in the majority of the prayer books in the cities throughout Yemen." However, today, in all the Baladi-rite tikālil, the custom after drinking wine is to conclude the blessing with the format that is brought down in Maimonides, "Blessed art Thou, O Lord, for the land and its fruits", showing that Maimonides' impact on the development of the Yemenite tiklāl has been vital.

== Distinguishing features ==
The Baladi-rite prayer in its current textual form, at least in its uniqueness as a text that stands in a distinct category of its own and that does not fully conform with any other version, belongs to the Babylonian prayer rite, a branch whose first formulation appeared with the Siddur of Saadia Gaon. Despite a general trend to accommodate other well-known Jewish traditions, the Baladi-rite tiklāl has still retained much of its traditional distinguishing features. Among them:

- In the Baladi-rite tradition, there is no confession of sins arranged in alphabetical order, nor is there any confession said immediately before saying taḥanūnim (supplications) during nefilat panim following the Amida. Rather, the custom is to lie upon the floor on one's left side, cover one's head in his talith and to say the supplication, Lefanekha ani ḳorea, etc., followed by Avinu malkeinu, avinu attah, etc., excepting Mondays and Thursdays on which days the petitioner will also add other suppliant verses as in the Sephardic prayer books.
- The entire congregation reads it the Shema aloud in unison.
- The version of the Kaddish used contains elements not found in the siddurim used by other communities and is believed to date back to antiquity.

Full text of the Kaddish (Sephardic & Yemenite versions)

Comparative Texts
	Aramaic Text	Translation
Sephardic custom	יִתְגַּדַּל וְיִתְקַדַּשׁ שְּמֵהּ רַבָּא. בְּעָלְמָא דִּי בְרָא כִרְעוּתֵהּ. וְיַמְלִיךְ מַלְכוּתֵהּ. וְיַצְמַח פֻּרְקָנֵהּ וִיקָרֵב מְשִׁיחֵהּ. בְּחַיֵּיכוֹן וּבְיוֹמֵיכוֹן וּבְחַיֵּי דְכֹל בֵּית יִשְׂרָאֵל בַּעֲגָלָא וּבִזְמָן קָרִיב וְאִמְרוּ אָמֵן. יְהֵא שְׁמֵהּ רַבָּא מְבָרַךְ לְעָלַם וּלְעָלְמֵי עָלְמַיָּא יִתְבָּרַךְ. וְיִשְׁתַּבַּח וְיִתְפָּאַר וְיִתְרוֹמָם וְיִתְנַשֵּׂא וְיִתְהַדָּר וְיִתְעַלֶּה וְיִתְהַלָּל שְׁמֵהּ דְּקֻדְשָׁא בְרִיךְ הוּא. לְעֵלָּא מִן כָּל בִּרְכָתָא שִׁירָתָא תִּשְׁבְּחָתָא וְנֶחָמָתָא. דַּאֲמִירָן בְּעָלְמָא וְאִמְרוּ אָמֶן	May the great Name be magnified and sanctified in the world which He has created according to His will, and may He establish His kingdom, and cause His salvation to flourish, and may He draw nigh His anointed one, even during your lifetime and in your days, and during the lifetime of the whole house of Israel, swiftly, yea, soon, and say ye, Amen. May His great Name be blessed forever; [even] unto all eternity may the Name of the Holy One, blessed be He, be blest, and honoured, and glorified and extolled and uplifted and magnified and exalted and praised, above all blessings and songs and praises and consolations which are said in the world, and say ye, Amen.
Old Yemenite custom	יִתְגַּדַּל וְיִתְקַדַּשׁ שְׁמֵיהּ רַבָּא. בְּעָלְמָא דִּי בְרָא כִרְעוּתֵיהּ וְיִמְלוֹךְ מַלְכוּתֵיהּ וְיַצְמַח פּוּרְקָנֵיהּ וִיקָרֵב מְשִׁיחֵיהּ וְיִפְרוֹק עַמֵּיהּ. בְּחַיֵּיכוֹן וּבְיוֹמֵיכוֹן וּבְחַיֵּיהוֹן דְּכָל בֵּית יִשְׂרָאֵל בַּעֲגַלָא וּבִזְמָן קָרִיב וְאִמְרוּ אָמֵן. יְהֶא שְׁמֵיהּ רַבָּא מְבָרַךְ לְעָלַם וּלְעָלְמֵי עָלְמַיָּא יִתְבָּרַךְ. יִשְׁתַּבַּח יִתְפָּאַר יִתְרוֹמַם יִתְעַלֶּה יִתְהַדַּר יִתְהַלַּל וְיִתְנַשֵּׂא שְׁמֵיהּ דְּקוּדְשָׁא בְּרִיךְ הוּא. לְעֵילָא לְעֵילָא מִכָּל בִּרְכָתָא שִׁירָתָא וְתוּשְׁבְּחָתָא וְנֶחָמָתָא דִּי אֲמִירָן בְּעָלְמָא וְאִמְרוּ אָמֵן	May the great Name be magnified and sanctified in the world which He has created according to His will, and may He establish His kingdom, and cause His salvation to flourish, and may He draw nigh His anointed one and save His people, even during your lifetime and in your days, and in the lifetime of the whole house of Israel, swiftly, yea, soon, and say ye, Amen. May His great Name be blessed forever; [even] unto all eternity may the Name of the Holy One, blessed be He, be blest, honoured, glorified, extolled, exalted, magnified, praised and uplifted, above and beyond all blessings and songs and praises and consolations which are said in the world, and say ye, Amen.

- In the earlier Baladi-rite tikālil one could not find after the morning, afternoon, and evening prayers the text now widely known as ʻAleinu le’shebeaḥ (Hebrew: עלינו לשבח), but only in the Mussaf-prayer said on Rosh Hashanah. Today, the custom among adherents to the Baladi-rite (like the Italian rite) is to say Aleinu le’shebeaḥ only during shaḥrith and ʿaravith, but not in minḥa. (Note: According to Shalom Yitzhak Halevi, quoting from Tiklāl Khalaf, the reason Aleinu le’shebeaḥ is not said during minḥa is because they never enacted the saying of Aleinu le’shebeaḥ except to counter the worshipers of the sun in the morning, and the worshipers of the moon in the evening. He cites the words inscribed in the margin of his 1894 edition of Tiklāl ʿEṣ Ḥayyim, p. 88a. This opinion is also brought down by Yitzhak Wanna in his Baladi-rite tiklāl. Even so, according to Salaḥ, in his commentary ʿEṣ Ḥayyim, the omission of Aleinu le’shebeḥ during minḥa was espoused by the rabbi and kabbalist Meir ben Ezekiel ibn Gabbai, author of Tola'at Ya'akov (written in 1507), who wrote: "We do not say Aleinu le'shebeaḥ except in the morning and in the evening, but not during the Afternoon prayer." See: Salaḥ, Y. (1894), vol. 1, p. 88a; Salaḥ, Y. (1979b), vol. 1, p. 168a.) (Note: According to Dr. Aharon Gaimani of Bar-Ilan University, Zechariah Dhahiri (d. 1608) was the first of Yemenite Sages to introduce the practice of saying Aleinu le’shabeaḥ after the prayer, which practice was adopted also among Baladi-rite congregations. Dr. Gaimani, citing Dhahiri, Z. (1991), who brings down elements of the Sephardic prayer rite in his theosophical commentary on the Pentateuch, Ṣeidah la’derekh (Victuals for the Road), vol. 2, on Leviticus, chapter 7 – Parashat Ṣav, p. 32 (16b): "He then concludes after everything [by saying] Aleinu le’shabeaḥ. The reason being that in the world there are idolaters, who according to their custom bow down to their idols each day, while we [on the other hand] are required to praise and to bow down in our manner of service, seeing that we are not like unto them, may God forbid, since they bow down to vanity and emptiness and pray to that which is no profit, etc." (See: Gaimani’s lecture notes, entitled: מנהגים עתיקים ומנהגים חדשים בתורתו של ר' זכריה אלצ'אהרי, given at the Ben-Zvi Institute on 18 June 2014).)
- The older tikālil also contained formularies of documents (Marriage contracts, bills of divorce, court waiver of rights to payment, legal attestations, calendric tables for reckoning the intercalation of the years, etc.) which are lacking in the modern tikālil. Most also contained Halakhic compendia, such as the modi operandi for Havdallah and for establishing an Eruv#Eruv chatzerot'ʿeruv, for separating the dough portion (ḥallah), as well as for the pidyon haben and brit milah. So, too, the Old Baladi-rite tikālil contained a brief overview of the laws governing the making tzitzit and the writing of mezuzot. Most also contained a copious collection of piyyutim and selichot.
- The single individual who prays alone and cannot join a minyan follows nearly the same standard format as those who pray among the congregants. However, unlike the congregation, he that prays alone alters the Kaddish by saying in its place the Brikh shmeh before and after the Amida. (Open window for text)

Full-text of the Brikh shmeh (with English translation)
בְּרִיךְֿ שְׁמֵיהּ דְּקוּדְֿשָׁא בְּרִיךְֿ הוּא לְעֵילָא לְעֵילָא מִכָּל בִּרְכָֿתָֿא שִׁירָתָֿא וְתֻֿשְׁבְּחָתָֿא וְנֶחָמָתָֿא דַּאֲמִירָן בְּעָלְמָא. תִּתְֿקַבַּל צְלוֹתִֿי וּבָֿעוּתִֿי עִם צְלוֹתְֿהוֹן וּבָֿעוּתְֿהוֹן דְּכָֿל בֵּיתֿ יִשְׂרָאֵל קֳדָֿם אֲבֿוּנָא דְּבִֿשְׁמַיָּא. יְהֶא שְׁלָמָא רַבָּא מִן שְׁמַיָּא וְסִיַּעְתָּא וּפֿוּרְקָנָא וּרְוַחָא וְחִנָּא וְחִסְדָּא וְרַחֲמֵי עֲלַנָא וְעַל כָּל קְהָלְהוֹן דְּכָֿל בֵּיתֿ יִשְׂרָאֵל לְחַיִּים וּלְשָׁלוֹם וְאִמְרוּ אָמֵן. עוֹשֶׂה שָׁלוֹם בִּמְרוֹמָיו הוּא בְֿרַחֲמָיו וַחֲסָדָֿיו יַעֲשֶׂה שָׁלוֹם עָלֵינוּ וְעַל כָּל יִשְׂרָאֵל וִינַחֲמֵנוּ בְֿצִיּוֹן וְיִבְֿנֶה בְֿרַחֲמָיו אֶת יְרוּשָׁלִָם בְּחַיֵּינוּ וּבְֿיָמֵינוּ בְּקָרוֹבֿ אָמֵן וְאָמֵן.
[Translation]:

Blessed is the Name of the Holy One, blessed be He, above and beyond all blessing, song and praise, or consolation, spoken in the universe. May my prayer and my supplication be acceptable, along with the prayer and supplication of the entire house of Israel before our Father who is in heaven. May there be abundant peace from heaven, and help and salvation and respite and favour and grace and mercies upon us and upon the entire congregation of the whole house of Israel, for life and for peace, and say ye, Amen. He that makes peace in His high places, He by his mercies and acts of loving kindness shall make peace upon us and upon all Israel, and He shall comfort us in Zion, and shall build by His mercies Jerusalem, even in our lifetime and in our days, soon to come. Amen and amen.

- The single individual who prays alone does not say the Qeddusha, but rather says, "qeddushath Adonai ṣeva'oth" (קדושת יי' צבאות).
- The Baladi-rite custom is not like the custom of the other Jewish communities who separate the parashot (pericopes) Chukat and Balak for the Weekly Torah portion. Instead, Yemenites traditionally connect these two pericopes for most years while separating the parashot Masei and Matot.

=== Megillat Antiochus ===
One of the more salient features of all the older Baladi-rite tikālil, as well as those compiled by Yiḥya Bashiri, is the Aramaic Megillat Antiochus with Saadia Gaon's Arabic translation.

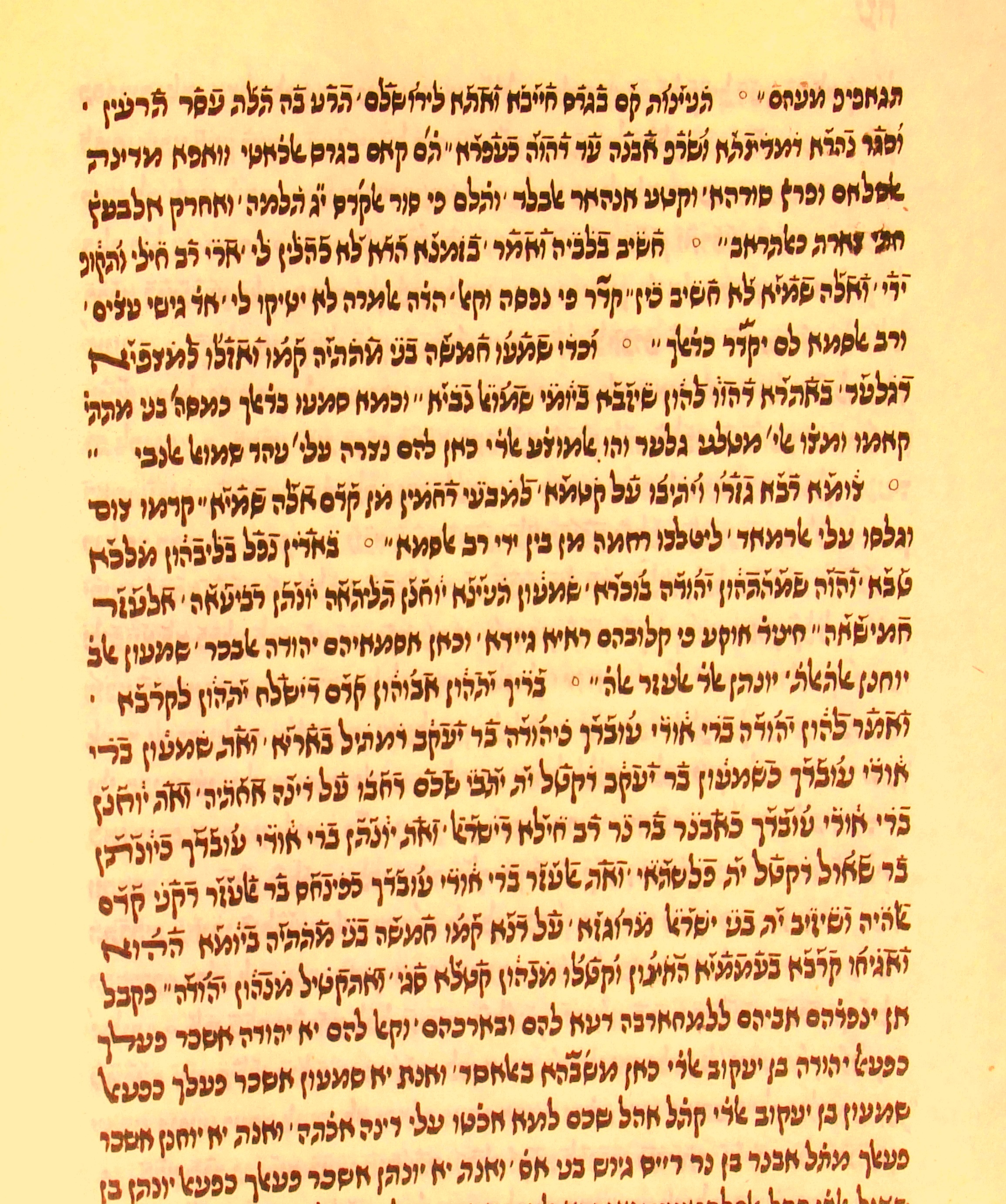
Aramaic Megillat Antiochus written with Babylonian vocalization, including a Judeo-Arabic translation

=== Tractate Avoth ===
According to 16th–17th century Yemenite tikālil, many Yemenites, but not all, recited only the first chapter of Avoth after the Shabbat minḥah, doing so throughout the year. Beginning with the 17th century, external influence —just as with the Shami prayer text—brought about completely changed customs, with the prevalent custom today being to read the entire tractate throughout the Sabbaths between Passover and Shavuot, a chapter each Shabbath as non-Yemenite Jews customarily do. Yosef Shalom Qoraḥ was quoted as pointing out that in the synagogues of Yiḥyah Qafiḥ and Yiḥye al-Abyadh, rather than apportioning the learning for the Shabbats between Passover and Shemini Atzeret, they would learn the entire tractate with Maimonides' commentary during the two days of Shavuot.

=== First night of Shavuot ===
The custom among Yemenites in recent years was to read the Tikkun in the synagogues on the night of Shevuot, although in the old Yemenite tiklālil they did not mention anything unique about the night of Shavuot compared to other holidays; the practice relating to the Tikkun came to Yemen only from approximately the second half of the eighteenth-century. Furthermore, while in most of the synagogues in Yemen they would learn the "Tikkūn" of machzorim and Sephardic prayer books, in some they would learn the Sefer Hamitzvot of Maimonides, while according Yiḥyah Qafiḥ it was learned in the original Judeo-Arabic. Even among the Baladi-rite congregations in Sana'a who embraced Kabbalah, they received with some reservation the custom of the kabbalists to recite the "Tikkūn" throughout the night. They would only recite the "Tikkūn" until about midnight and then go to sleep.

== Other features peculiar to the Baladi-rite ==
- In Baladi- and Shami-rite synagogues, the corresponding verses of the weekly Torah reading are read aloud from the Targum Onkelos, a targum or Aramaic translation made of each verse. The custom is for the targum to be read one verse at a time, following each verse read aloud from the Torah scroll, a practice long since abandoned by other communities. This is read on Sabbath mornings and on holidays when the Torah-scroll is taken out of the Torah ark and read in public.
- On the night of Passover, the Baladi-rite tiklāl requires making four separate blessings over the four cups of wine before drinking them as prescribed both by the Geonim and the Jerusalem Talmud.
- During the seven days of Passover, whenever eating matzah, the Baladi-rite custom is to always bless over loaves, whether the day is Chol HaMoed or a Shabbat that fell during the mid-festival, or a festival day itself that fell on a Shabbat.
- The Yemenite custom is to make a blessing over the hand washing before dipping the karpas, especially during the night of Passover. (Note: Compare Tosafot on Pesahim 115a-b, s.v. כל שטיבולו במשקה צריך נטילה, where it states at the very end of the Tosafist's response that "in all of the Siddurim it was written that a person is required to bless [over hand washing made when dipping a morsel into a liquid]." However, the Tosafist dissented with that view. Today, the only tiklāl which requires blessing over the hand washing when dipping a morsel into a liquid (such as at Pesach - Passover) is the Yemenite Baladi-rite tiklāl. All other Siddurim/Tefillot have since changed their custom following the view of the Tosafist.)
- The blessing over the Hanukkah candles has an additional prefix: ברוך אתה יי' אלהינו מלך העולם אשר קדשנו במצותיו וצונו להדליק נר שֶׁלַּחֲנֻכָּה.
- The Baladi-rite custom requires making the blessing "to dwell in the sukkah each time one enters one during Sukkot even if they did not intend to eat, following teachings brought down by Isaac ibn Ghiyyat (1038–1089) and by Maimonides.

=== Grace after meals ===
- The Birkat Hamazon shows an old format, lacking the additions added in subsequent generations by other communities. (Note: Jacob ben Asher, the son of Asher ben Jehiel, says in the Tur (Orach Chaim § 189:1) that the fourth blessing known as "the good and the benevolent" had been expanded in later generations to include the words: "He hath been good unto us, He doeth good unto us, (and) He will do good unto us." This addition is missing in the old Yemenite version of the Grace said after meals. However, the same addition has also been prescribed by Tosafoth (Berakhoth 46b), s.v. והטוב, and by Yonah Gerondi, who all require saying these words following a homily brought down by David Abudirham. Even so, Ya'akov in his Tur (ibid.) admits that it is only a later practice, and was not originally part of the fourth blessing – the good and the benevolent.)

Full text of Grace after meals (Birkath Hamazon)
English Translation	Original Hebrew
Blessed art thou, O Lord our God, King of the universe, who sustaineth the whole world with goodness, with loving-kindness and with mercy, and whose great goodness hath never been wanting unto us, nor will it ever be wanting, [even] unto eternity. For He it is who sustaineth, and feedeth and doth provide sustenance to all, as has been said: 'Opening up thy hand, and satisfying every living thing with favour, and providing food to all His creatures that He did create.' Blessed art thou O Lord who sustaineth all.	ברוך אתה יי' אלהינו מלך העולם הזן את העולם כולו בטוב בחן בחסד וברחמים וטובו הגדול לא חסר לנו ואל יחסר לנו לעולם ועד כי הוא זן ומזין ומפרנס לכל כאמור פותח את ידך ומשביע לכל חי רצון ומכין מזון לכל בריותיו אשר ברא. ברוך אתה יי' הזן את הכל.
We thank thee, O Lord our God, and we bless thee, our King, for thou hast caused our fathers to inherit a pleasant land, one which is good and broad, [and hast given us] a covenant and a Law, [and especially] for thy taking us out of the land of Egypt, and thy having redeemed us from the house of bondage; but [also] for thy Law which thou hast taught us, and for the ordinances of thy will which thou hast made known unto us. All of which things, O Lord our God, we give thanks unto you, and bless thy name, as it has been said: 'When thou hast eaten and art full, then thou shalt bless the Lord thy God for the good land which he hath given thee.' Blessed art thou O Lord, for the land and for the food.	נודה לך יי' אלהינו ונברכך מלכינו כי הנחלת את אבותינו ארץ חמדה טובה ורחבה ברית ותורה על שהוצאתנו מארץ מצרים ופדיתנו מבית עבדים ועל תורתך שלמדתנו ועל חקי רצונך שהודעתנו. ועל כולם יי' אלהינו אנו מודים לך ומברכים את שמך כאמור ואכלת ושבעת וברכת את יי' אלהיך על הארץ הטובה אשר נתן לך. ברוך אתה יי' על הארץ ועל המזון.
Have mercy, O Lord our God, upon us and upon Israel thy people, and upon Jerusalem thy city, and upon Zion the habitation of thy glory, and upon that great and holy edifice on which thy name is called, while the kingdom of the house of David thy anointed bring again to its place, [even] in our days. Build, moreover, Jerusalem thy city like as which thou hast spoken. Blessed art thou O Lord, who builds up Jerusalem with His tender mercies. Amen.	רחם יי' אלהינו עלינו ועל ישראל עמך ועל ירושלם עירך ועל ציון משכן כבודך ועל הבית הגדול והקדוש שנקרא שמך עליו ומלכות בית דוד משיחך תחזיר למקומה בימינו. ובנה את ירושלם עירך כאשר דברת. ברוך אתה יי' בונה ברחמיו את ירושלם. אמן.
Blessed art thou, O Lord our God, King of the universe, [He that is] God, our Father, our King, our Mighty One, our Creator, our Holiness, [even] the Holy One of Jacob, the good and benevolent King. For on each day, He it is that bestows upon us grace and loving-kindness and mercy, and all good things. The Merciful One, may He be praised for everlasting generations; The Merciful One, may He be glorified throughout eternity; The Merciful One, may He provide us a living with honour; The Merciful One, may He cause us to merit the days of the Messiah, and the re-building of the Temple, as well as life in the world to come; He that magnifieth the deliverance of His [appointed] king, and sheweth kindness to His anointed, and to his seed for evermore. Young lions have been impoverished and have suffered hunger, but those who inquire after the Lord have not wanted any good thing. Give thanks unto the Lord, for He is good; for his kindness endureth forever.	ברוך אתה יי' אלהינו מלך העולם האל אבינו מלכינו אדירנו בוראינו קדושינו קדוש יעקב. המלך הטוב והמטיב שבכל יום הוא גומלינו חן וחסד ורחמים וכל טוב. הרחמן ישתבח לדורי דורים. הרחמן יתפאר לנצח נצחים. הרחמן יפרנסנו בכבוד. הרחמן יזכנו לימות המשיח ולבנין בית המקדש ולחיי העולם הבא. מגדול ישועות מלכו ועושה חסד למשיחו לדוד ולזרעו עד עולם. כפירים רשו ורעבו ודורשי יי' לא יחסרו כל טוב. הודו ליי' כי טוב כי לעולם חסדו.

=== Other practices ===
- The Counting of the Omer is said in Aramaic rather than Hebrew. The emissary of the congregation blesses over the counting, thus fulfilling the duty of the entire congregation, although each member also counts.
- The textual variant of the Qeddusha said in the Shabbat Mussaf shows signs of an early tradition antedating the version used by other communities insofar that the original version was said without the Shema. (Note: An early ninth century Babylonian scholar, Pirkoi ben Baboi, in a document originally preserved in the Old Cairo Geniza at Fusṭaṭ (now in the Cambridge Univ. Library, Taylor-Schecter Collection, T-S NS 275.27, published in Ginzei Schechter by Louis Ginzberg, book 2, Jewish Theological Seminary of America: Hermon 1969, pp. 544–573) makes note of the fact that during the persecutions under the Roman-Byzantine emperors, there was a decree which prohibited Jews from reciting the Shema (Hear, O Israel) verses, but in order to circumvent this prohibition, Jews had inserted the addition of Shema (Hear, O Israel) in the Mussaf Prayer on Sabbath days. However, when the persecutions ceased, the recital of the Shema in the Mussaf remained the norm for most communities, whereas Pirkoi ben Baboi implores the Jews of North Africa to return to their original practice, calling their continuance in such practices as being no more than “customs of abjuration.” In the view of Yihya al-Qafih (Milḥamoth Hashem, 1931), as well as Yiḥyah Salaḥ (see infra.), who allege that the original Yemenite Jewish custom in the third benediction on Sabbath days was not to say Kether yitenu lekha, etc., but only to make use of the third benediction said on weekdays (e.g. נקדישך וכו), it would seem that the newer Baladi-rite custom to say Kether yitenu lekha, etc., follows the old custom in the Land of Israel (as described in the Zohar, Parashat Pinḥas) before the changes took effect in consequence of those persecutions. Even so, the Zohar makes it clear that saying, "Kether yitenu lekha," etc. was only a later enactment. Cf. Salaḥ, Y. (1979b), vol. 1, Mussaf shel-shabbath, s.v. כתר, p. 218a; p. 289b in other editions (Hebrew)) (Open window for text)

Qeddushah of Mussaf (Sephardic & Yemenite versions)

Comparative Texts
	Hebrew Text	Translation
Sephardic custom	כֶּתֶר יִתְּנוּ לְךָ יְיָ' אֱלֹהֵינוּ מַלְאָכִים הֲמוֹנֵי מַעְלָה עִם עַמְּךָ יִשְׂרָאֵל קְבוּצֵי מַטָּה. יַחַד כּוּלָּם קְדוּשָּׁה לְךָ יְשַׁלֵּשׁוּ כַּדָּבָר הָאָמוּר עַל יַד נְבִיאָךְ. וְקָרָא זֶה אֶל זֶה וְאָמַר קָדוֹשׁ קָדוֹשׁ קָדוֹשׁ יְיָ' צְבָאוֹת מְלֹא כָל הָאָרֶץ כְּבוֹדוֹ. כְּבוֹדוֹ מָלֵא עוֹלָם וּמְשָׁרְתָיו שׁוֹאֲלִים אַיֵּה מְקוֹם כְּבוֹדוֹ לְהַעֲרִיצוֹ. לְעוּמָּתָם מְשַׁבְּחִים וְאוֹמְרִים בָּרוּךְ כְּבוֹד יְיָ' מִמְּקוֹמוֹ. מִמְּקוֹמוֹ הוּא יִפֶן בְּרַחֲמָיו לְעַמּוֹ הַמְיַחֲדִים שְׁמוֹ עֶרֶב וָבוֹקֶר בְּכָל יוֹם תָּמִיד אוֹמְרִים פַּעֲמַיִם בְּאַהֲבָה. שְּמַע יִשְׂרָאֵל יְיָ' אֱלֹהֵינוּ יְיָ' אֶחָד. הוּא אֱלֹהֵינוּ הוּא אָבִינוּ הוּא מַלְכֵּנוּ הוּא מוֹשִׁיעֵנוּ הוּא יוֹשִׁיעֵנוּ וְיִגְאָלֵנוּ שֵׁנִית. וְיַשְׁמִיעֵנוּ בְּרַחֲמָיו לְעֵינֵי כָּל חַי לֵאמֹר הֵן גָּאַלְתִּי אֶתְכֶם אַחֲרִית כְּרֵאשִׁית לִהְיוֹת לָכֶם לֵאלֹהִים. אֲנִי יְיָ' אלהיכם. וּבְדִבְרֵי קָדְשְׁךָ כָּתוּב לֵאמֹר יִמְלוֹךְ יְיָ' לְעוֹלָם אֱלֹהַיִךְ צִיּוֹן לְדוֹר וָדוֹר הַלְלוּיָהּ. אַתָּה קָדוֹשׁ וְשִׁמְךָ קָדוֹשׁ. וּקְדוֹשִׁים בְּכָל יוֹם יְהַלְלוּךָ סֶּלָה. (כי אל מלך גדול וקדוש אתה). בָּרוּךְ אַתָּה יְיָ' הָאֵל הַקָּדוֹשׁ	A multitude of angels above shall give a crown unto you, O Lord our God, along with your people Israel, who are but bands below. All of them together shall ascribe sanctity unto you three times, as that matter spoken of by your prophet: ‘And each shall call out to the other and say, Holy! Holy! Holy is the Lord of hosts! The whole earth is full of His glory!’ [Seeing that] His glory fills the universe, His servants then inquire, ‘Where is the place of His glory so as to permit our showing adoration of Him?’ In front of them, [others, in response], give praise and say, ‘Blessed be the glory of the Lord from His [ubiquitous] place!’ From His [ubiquitous] place He will turn in mercy and bestow grace unto the people who, reciting the Shema evening and morning, twice daily, proclaim in love the unity of His name, saying: Hear, O Israel. The Lord is our God; the Lord is One. He is our God; He is our Father; He is our King; He is our Deliverer. He shall deliver us and redeem us again, and shall, out of his tender mercies, cause us to hear in the presence of all the living, saying: ‘Behold! I have redeemed thee, in the end as at the beginning, so as to be unto you a God. I am the Lord your God.’ While in your holy word it is written, saying: ‘The Lord shall reign forever, even your God, O Zion, throughout all generations. Hallelujah!’ Holy art Thou and holy is thy name, and holy beings shall daily render you praise, forever! (For Thou art a great and holy Sovereign God). Blessed art Thou, O Lord, the holy God.
Yemenite custom	כֶּתֶר יִתְּנוּ לְךָ יְיָ' אֱלֹהֵינוּ מַלְאָכִים הֲמוֹנֵי מַעְלָה עִם עַמְּךָ יִשְׂרָאֵל קְבוּצֵי מַטָּה. יַחַד כּוּלָּם קְדוּשָּׁה לְךָ יְשַׁלֵּשׁוּ וְכֵן כָּתוּב עַל יַד נְבִיאָךְ וְקָרָא זֶה אֶל זֶה וְאָמַר קָדוֹשׁ קָדוֹשׁ קָדוֹשׁ יְיָ' צְבָאוֹת מְלֹא כָל הָאָרֶץ כְּבוֹדוֹ. (וחוזר ש"צ ואומר: כְּבוֹדוֹ וְהוֹדוֹ מְלֹא הָעוֹלָם כּוּלּוֹ וּמְשָׁרְתָיו שׁוֹאֲלִים זֶה לָזֶה אַיֵּה מְקוֹם כְּבוֹדוֹ). מְשַׁבְּחִים וְאוֹמְרִים בָּרוּךְ כְּבוֹד יְיָ' מִמְּקוֹמוֹ. (וחוזר ש"צ ואומר: מִמְּקוֹמְךָ מַלְכֵּנוּ תּוֹפִיעַ וְתִתְנַשֵּׂא וְתִמְלוֹךְ עָלֵינוּ כִּי מְחַכִּים אָנוּ לָךְ. מָתַי תִּמְלוֹךְ בְּצִיּוֹן בְּקָרוֹב בְּחַיֵּינוּ וּבְיָמֵינוּ). אָמֵן. תִּשְׁכּוֹן תִּתְגַּדַּל וְתִתְקַדַּשׁ בְּתוֹךְ יְרוּשָׁלִַם עִירָךְ לְדוֹר וָדוֹר וּלְנֵצַח נְצָחִים. וְעֵינֵינוּ תִרְאֶינָה בְּמַלְכוּת עוּזָּךְ כַּדָּבָר הָאָמוּר בְּשִׁירֵי קָדְשָׁךְ עַל יַד דָּוִד עַבְדָּךְ מְשִׁיחַ צִדְקָךְ. יִמְלוֹךְ יְיָ' לְעוֹלָם אֱלֹהַיִךְ צִיּוֹן לְדוֹר וָדוֹר הַלְלוּיָהּ. (וחוזר ש"צ ואומר: לְדוֹר וָדוֹר נַגִּיד גָּדְלָךְ וּלְנֵצַח נְצָחִים קְדוּשָּׁתָךְ נַקְדִּישׁ. שְׁבָחָךְ יְיָ' אֱלֹהֵינוּ מִפִּינוּ לֹא יָמוּשׁ כִּי אֵל מֶלֶךְ גָּדוֹל וְקָדוֹשׁ אָתָּה). בָּרוּךְ אַתָּה יְיָ' הָאֵל הַקָּדוֹשׁ	A multitude of angels above shall give a crown unto you, O Lord our God, along with your people Israel, who are but bands below. All of them together shall ascribe sanctity unto you three times, and so is it written by your prophet: ‘And each shall call out to the other and say, Holy! Holy! Holy is the Lord of hosts! The whole earth is full of His glory!’ (The precentor repeats by saying: [Seeing that] His glory and His majesty fill the universe entirely, His servants then inquire of each other, 'Where is the place of His glory? '). They give praise and say: ‘Blessed is the glory of the Lord from His [ubiquitous] place!’ (The precentor repeats by saying: From your [ubiquitous] place, our King, may you appear and be lifted up, and may you reign over us, seeing that we wait for Thee. When shall you reign in Zion, even quickly in our lifetime and in our days?). Amen. May you dwell in the midst of Jerusalem Thy city, being both magnified and sanctified, throughout all generations and throughout all eternity! And may our eyes see the kingdom of Thy strength, as that matter stated in the lyrics which show forth Thy holiness, by David Thy servant, the anointed one who stands for Thy justice. The Lord shall reign forever, even your God, O Zion, throughout all generations. Hallelujah! (The precentor repeats by saying: We shall tell of Thy greatness, and shall ascribe sanctity to Thy holiness. Thy praise, O Lord our God, shall not cease from our mouth, for Thou art a great and holy Sovereign God!). Blessed art Thou, O Lord, the holy God.

=== Prayer ===
- The practice in Yemenite congregations is for the emissary of the congregation to say the blessings before and after the Shema while everyone else in the synagogue remains quiet as they listen to him and answer Amen. Those who choose to recite the words along do so silently. Only the Shema itself is recited in unison.
- During ʿAravit on weekdays, "Blessed be Hashem forever" is recited as an extension of the second blessing after the Shema. This is recited as a separate, third blessing after the Shema in most Ashkenazi communities outside of Israel and in the Italian rite. (Note: Their enactment was to say the addition, beginning with the words, ברוך שומר עמו ישראל לעד. ברוך יי' לעולם אמן ואמן. ימלוך יי' לעולם אמן ואמן, etc., in the second blessing after Ḳiryat Shema, and which addition was intended to prolong the time of prayer in the synagogues for late-comers, so that they could still arrive in time to pray with the congregation when they reached the Standing Prayer, without being compelled to remain there alone when the congregants had all departed from the synagogue and walked to their homes at night. Synagogues were then built in fields at a distance outside of the city and there was a concern for their safety when returning home alone at night. For a greater summary of the Geonic enactment, which was once also practised by the Sefardic Jewish community before they eventually broke away from its practice, see: Meiri (2006), vol. 1 (Berakhot, s.v. וסמיכת גאולה לתפלה), p. 9; Tiklāl ʿEṣ Ḥayyim)

The Second Blessing after Ḳiryat Shema
English Translation	Original Hebrew
Cause us, O Lord our God, to lie down in peace, and cause us, O our King, to rise again unto life and peace. Spread over us the tabernacle of thy peace, while directing us aright through thine own good counsel. Protect us and preserve us, and deliver us from every kind of evil, as also from the fear of the night. May you break Satan, from before us and after us, and guard our going out and our coming in, for Thou art our Keeper and our Deliverer. May you hide us under the shadow of thy wings, as it is said, ‘Behold! He shall not slumber, nor sleep, the Keeper of Israel.’	השכיבנו יי' אלהינו לשלום והעמידנו מלכנו לחיים ולשלום. ופרוש עלינו סוכת שלומך ותקננו בעצה טובה מלפניך והגן בעדנו. ושמרנו והצילנו מכל דבר רע ומפחד לילה. ושבור השטן מלפנינו ומאחורינו. ושמור צאתנו ובואנו כי שומרנו ומצילנו אתה. ובצל כנפיך תסתירנו כדבר שנאמר הנה לא ינום ולא יישן שומר ישראל
(Geonic Addition) Blessed is He who keeps his people, Israel, forever. Blessed be the Lord forever! Amen and amen! May the Lord reign forever! Amen and amen! Now all the people had seen [it] and had fallen down upon their faces, and they said, ‘The Lord, He is God! The Lord, He is God!’ Save us, O Lord our God, and gather us from the nations in order to praise thy holy Name, even to garner praise in thy fame, for the Lord shall not forsake His people for His great namesake, for the Lord was pleased to make you His people. Deliverers shall come up on mount Zion to judge the mount of Esau, and the kingdom shall then be the Lord's. And the Lord shall be a King over all the earth; on that day, the Lord shall be One, and His Name One. Our God who art in heaven, perpetuate thy Name and thy kingdom upon us always. In thine hand is the soul of those who are living, as also the soul of those who are dead; in whose hand is the soul of every living thing, and the spirit of every human flesh. In thine hand will I commit my spirit; Thou hast redeemed me, O Lord, the God of truth! Now we are thy people, and the sheep of thy pasture. We shall thank thee forever, throughout all generations, and shall tell of thy fame. O Lord, deliver my soul from a mendacious lip, even from a deceitful tongue. Israel shall be saved in the Lord [with] an everlasting salvation. You shall not be ashamed, neither shall you be dismayed, forever more. May the Lord our God be with us, just as He was with our fathers. May He never leave us, nor forsake us, [but] incline our heart unto Him, so that [we] might walk in all His ways, and keep His commandments and His statutes and His judgments which He has commanded our fathers. Let every thing that hath breath praise the Lord, Halleujah! Blessed be the Lord in the day; blessed be the Lord in the night. Blessed be the Lord in the morning; blessed be the Lord in the evening. Blessed be the Lord in our lying down; blessed be the Lord in our rising up. We shall always praise thee, forever, and speak of thy faithfulness. Blessed art thou, O Lord, He who reigns in His glory, who lives and exists always, may He reign forever and ever. Amen.	ברוך שומר עמו ישראל לעד. ברוך יי' לעולם אמן ואמן. ימלוך יי' לעולם אמן ואמן. וירא כל העם ויפלו על פניהם ויאמרו יי' הוא האלהים. יי' הוא האלהים. הושיענו יי' אלהינו וקבצנו מן הגוים להודות לשם קדשך להשתבח בתהלתך. כי לא יטוש יי' את עמו בעבור שמו הגדול כי הואיל יי' לעשות אתכם לו לעם. ועלו מושעים בהר ציון לשפוט את הר עשו והיתה ליי' המלוכה. והיה יי' למלך על כל הארץ. ביום ההוא יהיה יי' אחד ושמו אחד. אלהינו שבשמים קים שמך ומלכותך עלינו תמיד. בידך נפש החיים ונפש המתים. אשר בידו נפש כל חי ורוח כל בשר איש. בידך אפקיד רוחי פדית אותי יי' אל אמת. ואנחנו עמך וצאן מרעיתך נודה לך לעולם לדור ודור נספר תהלתך. יי' הצילה נפשי משפת שקר מלשון רמיה. ישראל נושע ביי' תשועת עולמים לא תבושו ולא תכלמו עד עולמי עד. יהי יי' אלהינו עמנו כאשר היה עם אבותינו אל יעזבנו ואל יטשנו. להטות לבבנו אליו ללכת בכל דרכיו ולשמור מצותיו וחקיו ומשפטיו אשר צוה את אבותינו. כל הנשמה תהלל יה הללויה. ברוך יי' ביום ברוך יי' בלילה. ברוך יי' בבקר. ברוך יי' בערב. ברוך יי' בשכבנו. ברוך יי' בקומנו. תמיד נהללך סלה ונשיח באמונתך. ברוך אתה יי' המולך בכבודו חי וקים תמיד. ימלוך לעולם ועד אמן

- The third blessing of the Amidah retains the same form throughout the Ten Days of Repentance, even on weekdays, with the addition of ובכן.
- In Baladi and Shami services, the pesukei dezimra of Shahrit is chanted in unison by the whole sitting congregation, unlike other communities where only one person, usually the precentor, recites it aloud. The same rule applies to the recital of the Shema.
- Like the original Ashkenazic custom, in Yemenite public service (both Baladi and Shāmī), only one person says the Kaddish at any given time, but never two or more simultaneously. Moreover, in every Kaddish the words וְיִמְלוֹךְ מַלְכוּתֵיהּ וְיַצְמַח פּוּרְקָנֵיהּ וִיקָרֵב מְשִׁיחֵיהּ וְיִפְרוֹק עַמֵּיהּ are incorporated. The yod in the word וימלוך is vocalized with a ḥiraq, and the lamad with a ḥolam.
- The custom of the Baladi-rite is to answer "Amen" after the benediction Yotzer in Shahrit, as also to answer "Amen" during ʿAravit after the benediction "Maʿriv ʿAravim".
- The Kohenim do not wash their hands before standing up to bless the congregation. (Note: According to Yaakov Castro, there was no custom in Egypt for Kohenim to wash their hands immediately before blessing the congregation. The disparity in Jewish custom in this case is due to the ambiguity of the teaching, which states that a Kohen is not permitted to stand and bless the people with unwashed hands. The Yemenites hold this to mean the washing of hands in the morning, while others hold this to mean the washing of hands immediately before blessing the people.)
- When they read from two Torah scrolls, the Baladi-rite custom is not to take out the two scrolls simultaneously. They would take out one scroll and read from it. After the conclusion of the reading, the scroll is returned to the Torah ark and the second scroll is taken out and read. The Haftarah is read only after the scrolls have been returned to the ark.
- The Baladi-rite custom, on any given Monday or Thursday, as well as on Rosh Ḥodesh, is to return the Torah scroll to the ark after reading it before the congregation recites Ashrei yoshəvei vethəkha, 'odh yehallelukha seloh, etc. (אשרי יושבי ביתך עוד יהללוך סלה). This rule, however, does not apply to Shabbat and Festival days.
- The Baladi and Shami custom when reciting the Hallel is that the congregation attentively listens to the prayer leader reading without repeating the words of the Hallel but only cites the word Hallelujah in a repetitious manner, after each verse. Hallelujah is repeated 123 times, the age of Aaron. The congregation will repeat only a few selected verses from the Hallel. (Note: This practice is mentioned in the Babylonian Talmud, Sukkah 38b and in Tractate Sofrim (chapter 16). Cf. Maimonides, Hil. Hanukkah 3:12.)
- The Tikkun Chatzot does not appear in the Baladi-rite liturgies.

== Selections from tiklāl ==
The 'Standing Prayer' known as the Eighteen Benedictions, or Amidah, as prescribed in the Yemenite Baladi-rite tradition, and which is recited three times a day during weekdays, is here shown (with an English translation): (Open window for text)

Full text of the Baladi-rite Amidah (the Standing Prayer)
English Translation	Original Hebrew
Lord, open Thou my lips and my mouth shall declare Thy praise.	אֲדֹנָי שְׂפָתַי תִּפתָּח וּפִי יַגִּיד תְּהִלָתֶךָ
Blessed art Thou, O Lord our God and God of our fathers, God of Abraham, God of Isaac, and God of Jacob, mighty, revered and exalted God. Thou bestowest favour and possessest all things. Mindful of our fathers' kindness towards Thee, Thou wilt redeem their children's children. O merciful King, our Redeemer and Shield, Thou art blessed, O Lord, Shield of Abraham.	בָּרוּךְ אַתָּה יְיָ' אֱלֹהֵינוּ וֵאלֹהֵי אֲבוֹתֵינוּ, אֱלֹהֵי אַברָהָם אֱלֹהֵי יִצחָק וֵאלֹהֵי יַעֲקֹב, הָאֵל הַגָּדוֹל הַגִּבּוֹר וְהַנּוֹרָא אֵל עֶליוֹן, גּוֹמֵל חֲסָדִים טוֹבִים וְקוֹנֵה הַכֹּל, זוֹכֵר חַסְדֵי אָבוֹת וּמֵבִיא גוֹאֵל לִבנֵי בְנֵיהֶם. מֶלֶך רַחֲמָן מוֹשִׁיַע וּמָגֵן. בָּרוּךְ אַתָּה יְיָ' מָגֵן אַבְרָהָם
Thou, O Lord, art mighty forever. Thou givest life to the dead, and art great in affording salvation. [In summer add: Thou causest the dew to fall. / In winter add: Thou makest the wind to blow, and causest the rain to fall.] Thou sustainest the living with loving-kindness, and in great mercy bringeth back to life those who were dead. Thou healest the sick, upholdest those who fall, settest free those that are in bondage, and keepest faith with those that sleep in the dust. Who is like unto Thee, Thou who art most Omnipotent? Or, who can be compared to Thee, Thou who decreest death and life? Yet, faithful art Thou to resurrect the dead. Blessed art Thou, O Lord, who givest life to the dead.	אַתָּה גִּבּוֹר לְעוֹלָם אֲדֹנָי, מְחַיֶּה מֵתִים אָתָּה, וְרַב לְהוֹשִׁיַע. [בקיץ] מוֹרִיד הַטָּל / [בחורף] מַשִּׁיב הָרוּחַ וּמוֹרִיד הַגֶּשֶׁם מְכַלכֵּל חַיִּים בְּחֶסֶד מְחַיֶּה מֵתִים בְּרַחֲמִים רַבִּים, רוֹפֵא חוֹלִים סוֹמֵךְ נוֹפְלִים מַתִּיר אֲסוּרִים וּמקַיֵּים אֱמוּנָתוֹ לִישֵׁנֵי עָפָר. מִי כָמוֹךָ בַּעַל גְּבוּרוֹת וּמִי דוֹמֶה לָךְ מֵמִית וּמחַיֶּה. וְנֶאֱמָן אַתָּה לְהַחֲיוֹת מֵתִים. בָּרוּךְ אַתָּה יְיָ' מְחַיֶּה הַמֵּתִים
Holy art Thou, and Thy name is holy, and unto Thee holy beings will forever render praise daily. Blessed art Thou, O Lord, the holy God.	אַתָּה קָדוֹשׁ וּשִׁמךָ קָדוֹשׁ וּקדוֹשִׁים בְּכָל יוֹם יְהַלְלוּךָ סֶלָה. בָּרוּךְ אַתָּה יְיָ' הָאֵל הַקָּדוֹשׁ
Thou endowest man with knowledge and teachest mortal man understanding. O grant us knowledge, understanding and wisdom. Blessed art Thou, O Lord, who bestowest knowledge upon man. (On the night when the Sabbath departs, this benediction is said instead): Thou endowest man with knowledge and teachest mortal man understanding, and Thou hast distinguished between the holy and the profane, and between light and darkness, and between Israel and the nations; between the seventh day and the six working days. Just as Thou hast distinguished between the holy and the profane, so, too, redeem us and save us from all kinds of destructive forces, and from all kinds of tribulations that stir-up to come forth into the world, keeping us from all such things, and grant us knowledge, understanding and wisdom. Blessed art Thou, O Lord, who bestowest knowledge upon man.	אַתָּה חוֹנֵן לָאָדָם דַּעַת וּמלַמֵּד לֶאֱנוֹשׁ בִּינָה. חָנֵּנוּ מֵאִתָּךְ דֵּעָה וּבִינָה וְהַשׂכֵּל. בָּרוּךְ אַתָּה יְיָ' חוֹנֵן הַדָּעַת (במוצאי שבת אומרים במקומו): אַתָּה חוֹנֵן לָאָדָם דַּעַת וּמְלַמֵּד לֶאֱנוֹשׁ בִּינָה. וְאַתָּה הִבְדַּלְתָּ בֵּין קֹדֶשׁ לַחוֹל וּבֵין אוֹר לַחֹשֶׁךְ וּבֵין יִשְׂרָאֵל לַגּוֹיִם וּבֵין יוֹם הַשְּׁבִיעִי לְשֵׁשֶׁת יְמֵי הַמַּעֲשֶׂה. כְּשֵׁם שֶׁהִבְדַּלְתָּ בֵּין קֹדֶשׁ לַחוֹל, כָּךְ פְּדֵנוּ וְהַצִילֵנוּ מִכָּל מִינֵי מַשְׁחִית וּמִכָּל מִינֵי פוּרְעָנִיּוֹת הַמִּתְרַגְּשׁוֹת לָבוֹא בָעוֹלָם וְשָׁמְרֵנוּ מִן הַכֹּל וְחָנֵּנוּ מֵאִתָּךְ דֵּעָה וּבִינָה וְהַשְׂכֵּל. בָּרוּךְ אַתָּה יְיָ' חוֹנֵן הַדָּעַת
Bring us back, O our Father, to Thy divine Law (Torah), and draw us near, O our King, to Thy divine service, and bring us unto complete repentance before Thee. Blessed art Thou, O Lord, who desirest repentance.	הֲשִׁיבֵנוּ אָבִינוּ לְתוֹרָתֶיךָ וְקָרְבֵנוּ מַלכֵּנוּ לַעֲבוֹדָתֶךָ וְהַחזִירֵנוּ בִּתשׁוּבָה שְׁלֵמָה לְפָנֶיךָ. בָּרוּךְ אַתָּה יְיָ' הָרוֹצֶה בַּתְּשׁוּבָה
Forgive us, O our Father, for we have sinned. Pardon us, O our King, for we have transgressed. Verily Thou art a merciful and forgiving God. Blessed art Thou, O Lord, who art gracious and abundant in forgiveness.	סְלַח לָנוּ אָבִינוּ כִּי חָטָאנוּ, מְחוֹל לָנוּ מַלכֵּנוּ כִּי פָשָׁענוּ. כִּי אֵל טוֹב וְסַלָּח אָתָּה. בָּרוּךְ אַתָּה יְיָ' חַנּוּן וּמַרבֶּה לִסלוֹחַ
Consider our case, and plead our cause, and hasten to redeem us, for Thou art a strong God, King and Redeemer. Blessed art Thou, O Lord, Redeemer of Israel.	רְאֵה בְעָניֵינוּ וְרִיבָה רִיבֵנוּ וּמַהֵר לְגָאֳלֵנוּ כִּי אֵל מֶלֶךְ גּוֹאֵל וְחָזָק אָתָּה. בָּרוּךְ אַתָּה יְיָ' גּוֹאֵל יִשׂרָאֵל
Heal us, O Lord our God, and we shall be healed. Deliver us and we shall be saved. Grant, moreover, complete healing for all our ailments, for Thou art a God who is a merciful Healer. Blessed art Thou, O Lord, who healest the sick among Thy people Israel.	רְפָאֵנוּ יְיָ' אֱלֹהֵינוּ וְנֵרָפֵא. הוֹשִׁיעֵנוּ וְנִוָּשֵׁעָה, וְהַעֲלֵה רְפוּאָה שְׁלֵמָה לְכָל תַּחֲלוּאֵינוּ כִּי אֵל רוֹפֵא רַחֲמָן אָתָּה. בָּרוּךְ אַתָּה יְיָ' רוֹפֵא חוֹלֵי עַמּוֹ יִשׂרָאֵל
(In the winter, say:) Bless us, O Lord our God, in all the works of our hands. And do Thou bless this year, by giving dew and rain upon the face of the [dry] earth. Fill the entire world with Thy goodness, and satisfy the face of the inhabitable earth with the richness of Thy giving hands. Moreover, O Lord our God, watch and deliver this year, with all its produce, from all kinds of destruction, and from all kinds of afflictions. Let her substance remain, and let there be hope, and satisfaction, and peace, just as in the good years. Blessed art Thou, O Lord, who dost bless the years.	(בחורף) בָּרְכֵנוּ יְיָ' אֱלֹהֵינוּ בְּכָל מַעֲשֵׂה יָדֵינוּ וּבָרֵךְ אֶת שְׁנָתֵינוּ וְתֶן טָל וּמָטָר עַל פְּנֵי הָאֲדָמָה וְשַׂבַּע אֶת הָעוֹלָם כּוּלּוֹ מִטּוּבָךְ וְרַוֵּה פְּנֵי תֵבֵל מֵעוֹשֶׁר מַתְּנוֹת יָדֶיךָ. וְשָׁמרָה וְהַצִּילָה יְיָ' אֱלֹהֵינוּ אֶת הַשָּׁנָה הַזֹּאת וְאֶת כָּל מִינֵי תְבוּאָתָהּ מִכָּל מִינֵי מַשׁחִית וּמִכָּל מִינֵי פוּרעָנִיּוֹת וְתֶן לָהּ אַחֲרִית וְתִקוָה וְשׂוֹבַע וְשָׁלוֹם וּברָכָה כַּשָּׁנִים הַטּוֹבוֹת. בָּרוּךְ אַתָּה יְיָ' מְבָרֵךְ הַשָּׁנֵים
(In the summer, say:) Bless us, O Lord our God, in all the works of our hands. And do Thou bless this year with the gentle dews of favour, and of blessing, and of benevolence, just as in the good years. Blessed art Thou, O Lord, who dost bless the years.	(בקיץ) בָּרְכֵנוּ יְיָ' אֱלֹהֵינוּ בְּכָל מַעֲשֵׂה יָדֵינוּ וּבָרֵךְ אֶת שְׁנָתֵינוּ בְּטַלְלֵי רָצוֹן בְּרָכָה וּנדָבָה כַּשָּׁנִים הַטּוֹבוֹת. בָּרוּךְ אַתָּה יְיָ' מְבָרֵךְ הַשָּׁנִים
Sound the great ram's horn as proclamation for our freedom. Raise the banner to assemble our exiles from the four corners of the earth, so that they might go up to their own land. Blessed art Thou, O Lord, who gatherest the dispersed of Thy people Israel.	תְּקַע בְּשׁוֹפָר גָּדוֹל לְחֵרוּתֵינוּ וְשָׂא נֵס לְקַבֵּץ אֶת כָּל גָּלִיּוֹתֵינוּ מֵאַרבַּע כַּנפוֹת הָאָרֶץ לְאַרצֵנוּ. בָּרוּךְ אַתָּה יְיָ' מְקַבֵּץ נִדחֵי עַמּוֹ יִשׂרָאֵל
Restore our judges as of yore, and our counselors as aforetime. Remove from us grief and sighing. Reign Thou over us, O Lord, Thou alone in mercy, in justice and by vindicating us in judgment. Blessed art Thou, O Lord, Thou King who lovest righteousness and judgment.	הָשִׁיבָה שׁוֹפְטֵינוּ כְּבָרִאשׁוֹנָה וְיוֹעֲצֵינוּ כְּבַתְּחִלָּה. וְהָסֵר מִמֶּנּוּ יָגוֹן וַאֲנָחָה. וּמלוֹךְ עָלֵינוּ אַתָּה לְבַדֶּךּ בְּרַחֲמִים בְּצֶדֶק וּבמִשׁפָּט. בָּרוּךְ אַתָּה יְיָ' מֶלֶךְ אוֹהֵב צְדָקָה וּמִשׁפָּט
Let not the apostates have any hope. Even all the sectarians, and those who are informants, let them perish at a moment. But as for the kingdom that doeth wickedly, do Thou uproot and break quickly, even in our days. Blessed art Thou, O Lord, who breakest the power of the enemy, and subdueth those who would act wantonly.	לַמְּשׁוּמָּדִים אַל תְּהִי תִקוָה כָּל הַמִּינִים וְהַמּוֹסְרִים כְּרֶגַע יֹאבֵדוּ, וּמַלכוּת זָדוֹן תַּעֲקוֹר וְתִשׁבּוֹר מְהֵרָה בְיָמֵינוּ. בָּרוּךְ אַתָּה יְיָ' שׁוֹבֵר אוֹיְבִים וּמַכנִיַע זֵדִים
May Thy tender mercies, O Lord our God, be stirred towards the righteous and the pious, and towards the proselytes who have come for the sake of justice, as also towards the remnant of Thy people, the house of Israel. Do Thou give a good reward to all those who trust in Thy name, in truth. May our portion also be placed with them. May we never be ashamed, for in Thy name have we trusted, and in Thy salvation we have relied upon. Blessed art Thou, O Lord, who art the staff and trust of the righteous.	עַל הַצַּדִּיקִים וְעַל הַחֲסִידִים וְעַל גֵּרֵי הַצֶּדֶק וְעַל שְׁאֵרִית עַמְּךָ בֵית יִשׂרָאֵל יֶהֱמוּ רַחֲמֶיךָ יְיָ' אֱלֹהֵינוּ. וְתֵן שָׂכָר טֹוב לְכָל הַבּוֹטְחִים בְּשִׁמךָ בֶּאֱמֶת. וְשִׂים חֶלקֵנוּ עִמָּהֶם. לְעוֹלָם לֹא נֵבוֹשׁ כִּי בְשִׁמךָ בָטַחנוּ וְלִישׁוּעָתְךָ נִשׁעָנּוּ. בָּרוּך אַתָּה יְיָ' מִשׁעָן וּמִבטָח לַצַּדִיקִים
Dwell in the midst of Jerusalem, Thy city, just as Thou hast spoken. Build it so that it remains as an enduring habitation, even speedily, and in our own days! Blessed art Thou, O Lord, who buildest Jerusalem.	תִּשׁכּוֹן בְּתוֹךְ יְרוּשָׁלִַם עִירָךְ כַּאֲשֶׁר דִּבַּרתָּ וּבנֵה אוֹתָהּ בִּניַן עוֹלָם בִּמהֵרָה בְיָמֵינוּ. בָּרוּךְ אַתָּה יְיָ' בּוֹנֵה יְרוּשָׁלִָם
Cause the branch of David to soon flourish, and may his horn be exalted by Thy salvation. Blessed art Thou, O Lord, who causest the horn of salvation to flourish.	אֵת צֶמַח דָּוִד מְהֵרָה תַצמִיַח וְקַרנוֹ תָרוּם בִּישׁוּעָתֶךָ. בָּרוּךְ אַתָּה יְיָ' מַצמִיַח קֶרֶן הַישׁוּעָה
Hear our voice, O Lord our God. Have compassion and mercy upon us, and accept our prayers out of loving-mercy and favour. Turn us not away empty-handed from Thy presence. (Make personal requests here) For Thou hearest the prayer of every mouth. Blessed art Thou, O Lord, who hearest prayer.	שְׁמַע קוֹלֵנוּ יְיָ' אֱלֹהֵינוּ. חוּס וְרַחֵם עָלֵינוּ וְקַבֵּל בְּרַחֲמִים וּברָצוֹן אֶת תְּפִלָּתֵינוּ. מִלְּפָנֶיךָ מַלכֵּנוּ, רֵיקָם אַל תְּשִׁיבֵנוּ. כִּי אַתָּה שׁוֹמֵעַ תְּפִלַּת כָּל פֶּה. בָּרוּךְ אַתָּה יְיָ' שׁוֹמֵעַ הַתְּפִלָּה
Look with favour, O Lord, our God, upon Thy people Israel, and upon their prayer. Restore the divine worship to the inner sanctum of Thine house, as also the sacrificial offerings of Israel thy people. With loving favour, quickly accept their prayer, and may the divine worship of Israel Thy people always find favour with Thee. (On Rosh Hodesh, add: Our God and our God of our fathers, may our remembrance and the remembrance of our forefathers come before Thee, as well as the remembrance of Thy city, Jerusalem, as also the remembrance of the Messiah the son of David, Thy servant. So, too, the remembrance of all Thy people, the house of Israel, may it come before Thee, by granting them deliverance and well-being, and may it abound to our blessing, and to our favour and loving kindness, and mercy, even on this New lunar month; On it, have mercy upon us, and deliver us. On it, be mindful of us, O Lord our God, in what concerns our good. On it, remember us for a life of blessing. On it, deliver us unto life, even in what concerns Thy promise of salvation and mercy. Take pity upon us and favour us, and show us mercy. And, on it, deliver us from all trouble and anguish, while causing us to be exceedingly happy on it, for Thou art a God and King that is merciful and compassionate.) Thus, favouring us, our eyes shall see when Thou returnest unto Thy dwelling-place, even unto Zion, with mercies as at former times. Blessed art thou, O Lord, who bringest again His Divine Presence to Zion.	רְצֵה יְיָ' אֱלֹהֵינוּ בְּעַמְּךָ יִשׂרָאֵל וְלִתפִלָּתָם שְׁעֵה. וְהָשֵׁב הָעֲבוֹדָה אֶל דְּבִיר בֵּיתֶךָ וְאִשֵּׁי יִשׂרָאֵל. וּתפִלָּתָם מְהֵרָה תְקַבֵּל בְּרָצוֹן וּתהִי לְרָצוֹן תָּמִיד עֲבוֹדַת יִשׂרָאֵל עַמֶּךָ. ("כאן מוסיפין ברכת ראש חודש:" אֱלֹהֵינוּ וֵאלֹהֵי אֲבוֹתֵינוּ, יַעֲלֶה וְיָבוֹא, יַגִּיַע יֵרָאֶה, יֵרָצֶה יִשָּׁמַע, יִפָּקֵד יִזָּכֵר לְפָנֶיךָ זִכרוֹנֵנוּ, זִכרוֹן אֲבוֹתֵינוּ, זִכרוֹן יְרוּשָׁלִַם עִירָךְ, זִכרוֹן מָשִׁיַח בֶּן דָּוִד עַבדָּךְ, זִכרוֹן כָּל עַמְּךָ בֵית יִשׂרָאֵל לְפָנֶיךָ. לִפלֵיטָה לְטוֹבָה לִברָכָה לְחֵן לְחֶסֶד וּלרַחֲמִים בְּיוֹם רֹאשׁ הַחוֹדֶשׁ הַזֶּה. לְרַחֵם בּוֹ עָלֵינוּ וּלהוֹשִׁיעֵנוּ. זָכרֵנוּ יְיָ' אֱלֹהֵינוּ בּוֹ לְטוֹבָה. פָּקדֵנוּ בוֹ לִברָכָה. הוֹשִׁיעֵנוּ בוֹ לְחַיִּים, בִּדבַר יְשׁוּעָה וְרַחֲמִים. חוּס וְחָנֵּנוּ וְרַחֵם עָלֵינוּ. וּמַלְּטֵנוּ בוֹ מִכָּל צָרָה וְיָגוֹן וְשַֹמְּחֵנוּ בוֹ שִׂמחָה שְׁלֵמָה כִּי אֵל מֶלֶךְ רַחוּם וְחַנּוּן אָתָּה.) וְתִרצֵנוּ וְתֶחֱזֶינָה עֵינֵינוּ בְּשׁוּבְךָ לְנָוְךָ לְצִיּוֹן בְּרַחֲמִים כְּמֵאָז. בָּרוּךְ אַתָּה יְיָ' הַמַּחזִיר שְׁכִינָתוֹ לְצִיּוֹן
We thankfully acknowledge Thee, that Thou art the Lord our God, even the Rock whence cometh our existence; the Shield of our salvation. Thou art He who remainest from generation to generation, unto whom we give thanks, and tell of Thy praises. This, we do, on account of our lives that are committed into Thy hand, even our souls that are given into Thy charge; on account of Thy miracles and Thy wonders that are perpetual, whether at evening, morning or noontime. Thou art He who is good, for Thy mercies have never ceased. Thou art He who is merciful, for Thy loving-kindness will never fail. All of the living shall praise Thy great name, since goodness is ascribed unto the good God. Blessed art Thou, O Lord, whose name is always good, and to whom it is comely to give thanks.	מוֹדִים אֲנַחנוּ לָךְ שֶׁאַתָּה הוּא יְיָ' אֱלֹהֵינוּ צוּר חַיֵּינוּ מָגֵן יִשׁעֵנוּ. אַתָּה הוּא לְדוֹר וָדוֹר נוֹדֶה לָךְ וּנסַפֵּר תְּהִלָּתָךְ. עַל חַיֵּינוּ הַמְּסוּרִים בְּיָדָךְ, עַל נִשׁמוֹתֵינוּ הַפְּקוּדוֹת לָךְ. עַל נִסֶּיךָ וְנִפלְאוֹתֶיךָ שֶׁבְּכָל עֵת וְעֵת עֶרֶב וָבֹקֶר וְצָהֳרָיִם. הַטּוֹב כִּי לֹא כָלוּ רַחֲמֶיךָ, הַמְרַחֵם כִּי לֹא יִתַּמּוּ חֲסָדֶיךָ. כָּל הַחֲיִּים יְהַלְלוּ אֶת שְׁמָךְ הַגָּדוֹל כִּי טוֹב הָאֵל הַטּוֹב. בָּרוּךְ אַתָּה יְיָ' הַטּוֹב שְׁמָךְ תָּמִיד וְלָךְ נָאֶה לְהוֹדוֹת
Grant peace, goodness and a blessing; favour and grace, and mercies, upon us and upon Thy people Israel. And bless us all together with the radiant light of Thy face. For Thou hast given us the radiant light of Thy face, O Lord our God, even the divine Law (Torah), and life, and love, and grace, and righteousness and peace. And, even so, it is good in Thy sight to bless Thy people Israel at all times with peace. Blessed art Thou, O Lord, who blessest Thy people Israel with peace. Amen.	שִׂים שָׁלוֹם טוֹבָה וּברָכָה חֵן וְחֶסֶד וְרַחֲמִים עָלֵינוּ וְעַל יִשׂרָאֵל עַמֶּךָ. וּבָרְכֵנוּ כּוּלָּנוּ כְּאֶחָד מִמְּאוֹר פָּנֶיךָ. כִּי מִמְּאוֹר פָּנֶיךָ נָתַתָּ לָּנוּ יְיָ' אֱלֹהֵינוּ תּוֹרָה וְחַיִּים אַהֲבָה וְחֶסֶד צְדָקָה וְשָׁלוֹם. וְטוֹב בְּעֵינֶיךָ לְבָרֵךְ אֶת עַמְּךָ יִשׂרָאֵל בְּכָל עֵת בַּשָּׁלוֹם. בָּרוּךְ אַתָּה יְיָ' הַמְּבָרֵךְ אֶת עַמּוֹ יִשׂרָאֵל בַּשָּׁלוֹם. אָמֵן
May the words of my mouth and the meditation of my heart be acceptable before Thee, O Lord, my Rock and Redeemer. (He maketh peace in his high places. He, through his mercies and grace, will bring peace upon us and upon all of Israel, and shall comfort us in Zion, and will build by his mercies Jerusalem, even in our days quickly. Amen and Amen).	יִהיוּ לְרָצוֹן אִמרֵי פִי וְהֶגיוֹן לִבִּי לְפָנֶיךָ, יְיָ' צוּרִי וְגוֹאֲלִ. (עוֹשֶׂה שָׁלוֹם בִּמרוֹמָיו, הוּא בְרַחֲמָיו וַחֲסָדָיו יַעֲשֶׂה שָׁלוֹם עָלֵינוּ וְעַל כָּל יִשׂרָאֵל, וִינַחֲמֵנוּ בְצִיּוֹן וְיִבנֶה בְרַחֲמָיו אֶת יְרוּשָׁלִָם בְּחַיֵּינוּ וּביָמֵינוּ בְּקָרוֹב אָמֵן וְאָמֵן.)

Nishmath Kol Hai is recited on the Sabbath day, and dates back to the 5th century CE:

Nishmath Kol Hai

נִשְׁמַת כָּל חַי תְּבָרֵךְ אֶת שִׁמְךָ יְיָ' אֱלֹהֵינוּ וְרוּחַ כָּל בָּשָׂר לְךָ תְפָאֵר וּתְרוֹמֵם אֶת זִכְרְךָ מַלְכֵּינוּ תָּמִיד. לְדוֹר וָדוֹר מֵעוֹלָם וְעַד עוֹלָם אַתָּה הוּא הָאֵל. וּמִבַּלְעָדֶיךָ אֵין אֱלֹהִים. וְאֵין לָנוּ מֶלֶךְ גּוֹאֵל וּמוֹשִׁיעַ בְּכָל עֵת צָרָה וְצוּקָה אֵלָא אָתָּה. פּוֹדֶה וּמַצִּיל. מְפַרְנֵיס וּמְרַחֵם. אֱלוֹהַּ כָּל הַבְּרִיּוֹת. אֲדוֹן הַתּוֹלָדוֹת. הַמְּהוּלָּל בַּתּוּשְׁבָּחוֹת. הַמַּנְהִיג עוֹלָמוֹ בְּחֶסֶד וּבִרְיוֹתָיו בְּרַחֲמִים רַבִּים. וַיְיָ' אֱלֹהִים אֶמֶת לֹא יָנוּם וְלֹא יִישָׁן. הַמְּעוֹרֵר יְשֵׁנִים הַמֵּקִיץ רְדוּמִים. סוֹמֵךְ נוֹפְלִים וְרוֹפֵא חוֹלִים. וּמַתִּיר אֲסוּרִים. וּלְךָ אֲנַחְנוּ מוֹדִים. וְאִלּוּ פִינוּ מָלֵא שִׁירָה כַיָּם וּלְשׁוֹנֵינוּ רִנָּה כַּהֲמוֹן גַּלָּיו וְשִׂפְתוֹתֵינוּ שְׁבָח כְּמֶרְחֲבֵי הָרָקִיעַ וְעֵינֵינוּ מְאִירוֹת כַּשֶּׁמֶשׁ וְכַיָּרֵחַ. וְיָדֵינוּ פְרוּשׂוֹת כְּנִשְׁרֵי שָׁמָיִם וְרַגְלֵינוּ קַלּוֹת כָּאַיָּלוֹת, אֵין אָנוּ מַסְפִּיקִין לְהוֹדוֹת לְךּ יְיָ' אֱלֹהֵינוּ וּלְבָרֵךְ אֶת שִׁמְךָ מַלְכֵּינוּ עַל אַחַת מֵאֶלֶף אַלְפֵי אֲלָפִים וְרוֹב רִיבֵּי רְבָבוֹת פְּעָמִים הַטּוֹבוֹת שֶׁעָשִׂיתָ עִמָּנוּ וְעִם אֲבוֹתֵינוּ מִלְּפָנִים. מִמִּצְרַיִם גְּאַלְתָּנוּ יְיָ' אֱלֹהֵינוּ. מִבֵּית עֲבָדִים פְּדִיתָנוּ. בָּרָעָב זַנְתָּנוּ. וּבְשָׂבָע כִלְכַּלְתָּנוּ. וּמֵחֶרֶב הִצַּלְתָּנוּ. וּמִדֶּבֶר מִלַּטְתָּנוּ. וּמֵחֳלָאִים רָעִים רַבִּים דִּלִּיתָנוּ מַלְכֵּינוּ. וְעַד הֵנָּה עֲזָרוּנוּ רַחֲמֶיךָ יְיָ' אֱלֹהֵינוּ וְלֹא עֲזָבוּנוּ חֲסָדֶיךָ. עַל כֵּן אֵיבָרִים שֶׁפִּלַּגְתָּ בָּנוּ וְרוּחַ וּנְשָׁמָה שֶׁנָּפַחְתָּ בְּאַפֵּינוּ וְלָשׁוֹן אֲשֶׁר שַׂמְתָּ בְּפִינוּ, הֵן הֶן בְּרִנָּה יוֹדוּ לְךָ וִיבָרְכוּ אֶת שִׁמְךָ יְיָ' אֱלֹהֵינוּ עַל רוֹב נִסֵּי פְלָאֶיךָ כִּי כָל פֶּה לְךָ יוֹדֶה. וְכָל לָשׁוֹן לְךָ תְשַׁבֵּחַ. וְכָל עַיִן אֵלֶיךָ תְצַפֶּה. וְכָל בֶּרֶךְ לְךָ תִכְרַע. וְכָל קוֹמָה לְפָנֶיךָ תִשְׁתַּחֲוֶה. וְכָל הַלְּבָבוֹת יִירָאוּךָ. וְהַקְּרָבִִים וְהַכְּלָיוֹת יְזַמְּרוּ לִשְׁמֶיךָ. כְּדָבָר שֶׁנֶּאֱמָר כָּל עַצְמוֹתַי תֹּאמַרְנָה יְיָ' מִי כָמוֹךָ מַצִּיל עָנִי מֵחָזָק מִמֶּנּוּ וְעָנִי וְאֶבְיוֹן מִגּוֹזְלוֹ. וְנֶאֱמָר רַנְּנוּ צַדִּיקִים בַּיְיָ' לַיְשָׁרִים נָאְוָה תְהִלָּה. בְּפִי יְשָׁרִים תִּתְרוֹמַם. וּבְדִבְרֵי צַדִּיקִים תִּתְבָּרַךְ. וּבִלְשׁוֹן כָּל חֲסִידִים תִּתְקַדָּשׁ. וּבְקֶרֶב קְדוֹשִׁים תִּתְהַלָּל. וּבְמִקְהֲלוֹת רִבְבוֹת עַמְּךָ כָל בֵּית יִשְׂרָאֵל יִתְפָּאַר שִׁמְךָ יְיָ' אֱלֹהֵינוּ. שֶׁכֵּן חוֹבַת כָּל הַיְצוּרִים לְפָנֶיךָ יְיָ' אֱלֹהֵינוּ. לְהוֹדוֹת לְהַלֵּל לְשַׁבֵּחַ לְפָאֶר לְרוֹמֶם לְגַדֶּל וּלְהַדֶּר. עַל כָּל דִּבְרֵי זְמִירוֹת תּוּשְׁבְּחוֹת דָּוִד בֶּן יִשַׁי עַבְדְּךּ מְשִׁיחֶךָ.

[Translation]:

The breath of every living thing shall bless Thy name, O Lord our God! And the spirit of all flesh shall ever glorify and extol Thy memory, O our King! For generation after generation, from everlasting unto everlasting, Thou art God! But for Thee, there is no G-d; neither do we have any King, Redeemer or Deliverer in all times of trouble and distress but Thee! He that redeems and rescues; He that gives sustenance and shows mercy, even the G-d of all living creatures, the Lord of all generations that were ever born! Thou art He that is extolled by their praises! He that rules His world with loving kindness and His creatures with manifold tender mercies; Now the Lord God is the truth, He does not slumber, neither does He sleep. Thou art He that arouses those that sleep, and awakenest those that slumber; He that upholds those that fall, who heals the sick, who loosens those that are bound; it is to Thee that we give thanks.

Were our mouths filled with song as the sea, our tongues with joyful praise as the multitude of its waves, and our lips with adoration as the spacious firmament; were our eyes radiant as the sun and the moon, and our hands spread forth like the eagles of the sky, and our feet swift as hinds, we would still be unable to thank Thee, O Lord our God, or to bless Thy name, our King, [as becometh Thee], be it for one measure of the thousands upon thousands, and the abundant myriads upon myriads of times which Thou hast done good unto us and unto our fathers in ages past!

From Egypt Thou didst redeem us, O Lord our G-d! From the house of bondage Thou didst ransom us! During famine Thou didst feed us, and in time of plenty Thou didst sustain us! From the sword Thou didst save us, and from pestilence Thou hast caused us to escape, and from many sore ailments Thou hast lifted us up, O our King! Hitherto, Thy tender mercies have helped us, O Lord our God, while Thy loving-kindness hast not forsaken us!

Therefore, the limbs which Thou hast fashioned in us, and the spirit and soul which Thou hast breathed into our nasals, and the tongue which Thou hast set in our mouth, lo, they, by joyous singing, shall thank Thee and shall bless Thy name, O Lord our God, over the abundance of Thy miraculous wonders! For every mouth shall to Thee give thanks, and every tongue shall to Thee give praise, and every eye unto Thee shall look, while every knee unto Thee shall bend, and all that standeth shall bow down before Thee. All hearts shall then revere Thee, and [man's] inmost being and reins shall sing to Thy name, as it is written: 'All my bones shall say: O Lord, who is like unto Thee, which deliverest the poor from him that is too strong for him, yea, the poor and the needy from him that spoileth him?' (Ps. 35:10). And it is written: 'Rejoice in the Lord, O ye righteous: for praise is comely for the upright.' (Ps. 33:1).

By the mouth of the upright, be Thou exalted! By the words of the righteous, be Thou blest! By the tongue of all pious men, be Thou sanctified! And in the midst of the holy, be Thou praised! While in the assemblies of the multitudes of Thy people, even the whole house of Israel, may Thy name be glorified, O Lord our God. For such is the duty of all creatures towards Thee, O Lord our God, to give thanks, to laud, to praise, to glorify, to exalt, to magnify and to honour, even beyond all the words of song and praise uttered by David, the son of Jesse, Thine anointed!

== Published tiklāl editions ==
- Tefillath Kol Pe, ed. Yosef Hasid and Shelomo Siani, Jerusalem 1960
- Siyaḥ Yerushalayim, Baladi tiklāl in 4 vols, ed. Yosef Qafih, Kiryat-Ono 1995–2010
- Hatiklāl Hamevo'ar, ed. Pinḥas Qoraḥ, Benei Barak 2006
- Torat Avot, Baladi tiklāl (7 vols.), ed. Nathanel b. Yihya Alsheikh, Benei Barak
- Tefillat Avot, Baladi tiklāl (6 vols.)
- Tiklāl (ʿEṣ Ḥayyim Hashalem), ed. Shimon Salaḥ, 4 volumes, Jerusalem 1979
- Tiklāl Ha-Mefoar (Maharitz) Nosaḥ Baladi, Meyusad Al Pi Ha-Tiklal Im ʿEṣ Ḥayyim Ha-Shalem Arukh Ke-Minhag Yahaduth Teiman: Bene Berak: Or Neriyah ben Mosheh Ozeri: 2001 or 2002
- Tiklāl ʻim perush ʻEtz Ḥayyim la-maharitz zetz"al, kolel ʻAnaf Ḥayyim - hagahoth we-haʻaroth (ed. Sagiv Mahfud), Nosach Teiman: Bnei Brak 2012
- Tiklāl - ʻAṭereth Avoth (ed. Sagiv Mahfud), Nosach Teiman: Bnei Brak (OCLC 762506729)

== Baladi as original Yemenite custom ==
Although the word "Baladi" is used to denote the traditional Yemenite Jewish prayer, the word is also used to designate the old Yemenite Jewish custom in many non-related issues treating on Jewish legal law (Halacha) and ritual practices, and which laws are mostly aligned with the teachings of Maimonides' Code of Jewish Law, as opposed to the Shulchan Arukh of Joseph Karo.

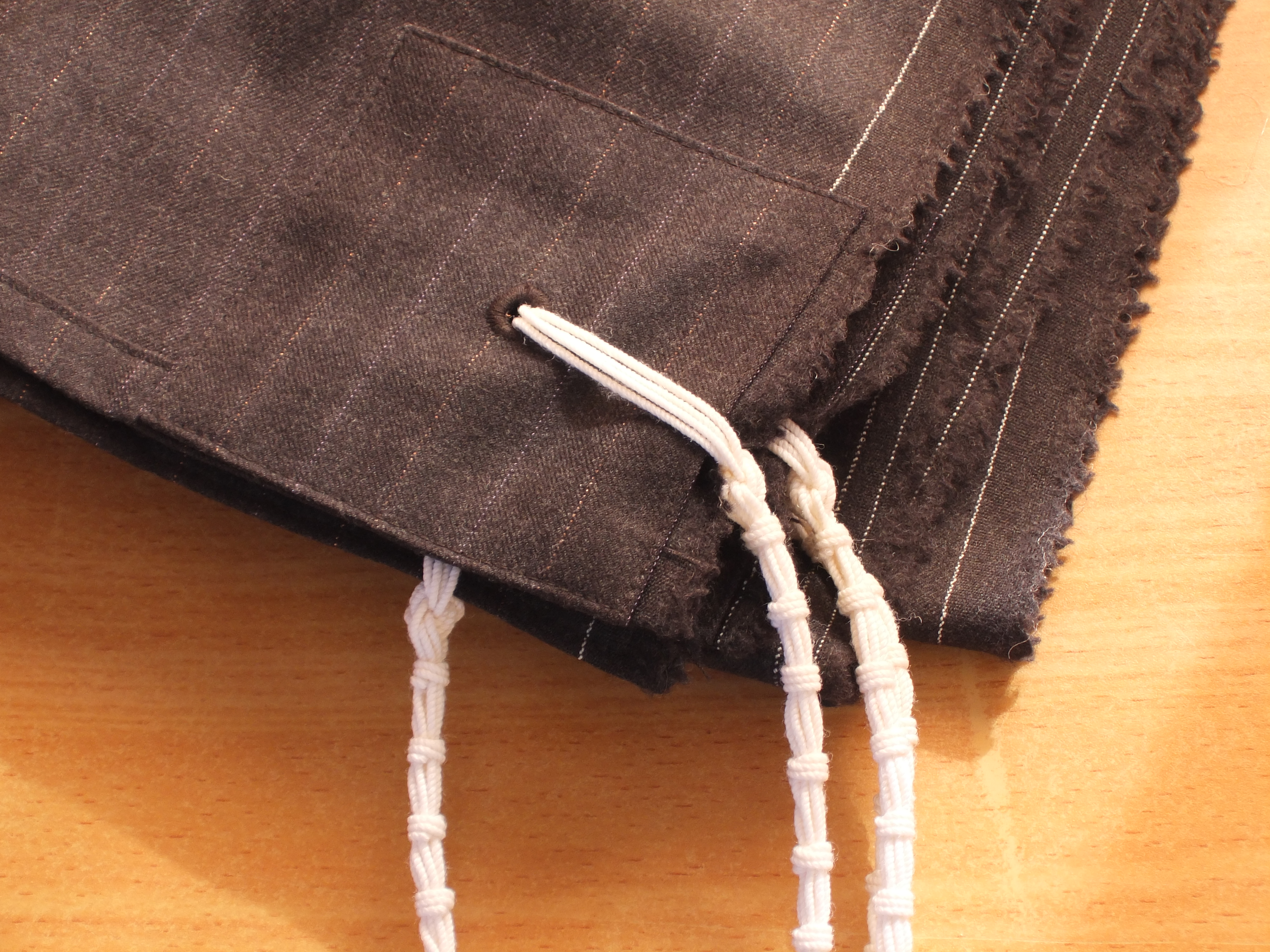
Yemenite tzitzit

- One of such practices is to constrict the blood locked within meats before cooking by throwing cut pieces of the meat (after salting and rinsing) into a pot of boiling water, and leaving them there for as long as it takes for the meat to whiten on its outer layer. This practice prevents the blood from oozing out, and is only a rabbinical precautionary measure (Cf. Hullin 111a). If soup was to be made from meat which was thrown into a pot of boiling water, it was not necessary to take out the meat. Rather, the froth and scum which surfaces were scooped away, and this sufficed. It was also a Jewish practice in Yemen that when salting the cut meat, the pieces are prepared no larger than half a roṭal (about the size of half an orange) so as to permit the effectiveness of the salt on that meat.
- The Baladi custom is to make tzitzit (tassels) with only seven "joints" (Hebrew: חוליות), without counting the first square-knot that is tied to the tassel where it is attached to the cloth. These seven "joints" each consist of only three windings and are not separated by knots. They are placed on the upper 1/3 length of the tassel, symbolic of the seven firmaments in heaven, while in the other 2/3 length of the tassel the strings are left to hang loose. Their Rabbis have interpreted the Talmud (Menahoth 39a) with a view that the "joints" and the "knots" are one and the same thing.

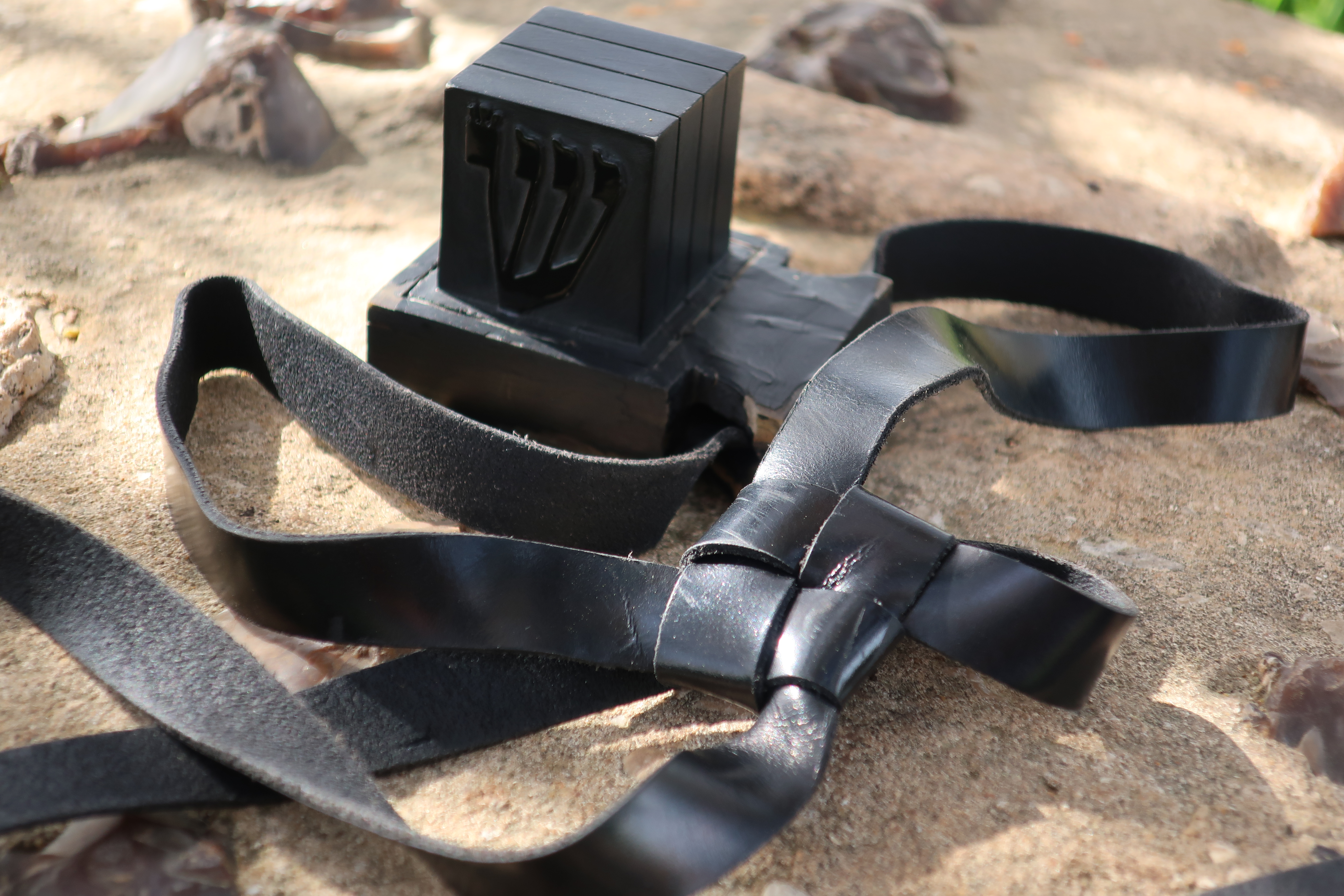
Yemenite head phylactery (tefillin) with straps

- The Baladi-rite custom of tying the knot (Hebrew: קשר) on the head phylactery (Tefillin) is for it to be made into a square, and follows the custom mentioned in Halakhot Gedolot (Hil. Shimushei Tefillin): "One doubles the two heads (i.e. ends) of the straps [in the form of two separate loops] and feeds one through the other, and the head (i.e. end) of the one in the end (loop) of the other, so that there is formed thereby the shape of a daleth." Practically speaking, its shape is only an imaginary daleth, made also in accordance with the old manner prescribed by the Jews of Ashkenaz.
- The Baladi-rite custom is for the people to wear their large talith on the night of the Sabbath, as well as on the night of any given Festival day. On ordinary days, all throughout the week, the shaliach tzibbur (emissary of the congregation) is required to be draped in his talith while leading the congregation in prayer during, both, Minchah and ʿArvith.

== See also ==
- Torah scroll (Yemenite)

== Bibliography ==
- Adani, Samuel ben Joseph (1997). Sefer Naḥalat Yosef (in Hebrew). Ramat-Gan: Makhon Nir David. OCLC 31818927. (reprinted from Jerusalem editions, 1907, 1917 and 1988)
- Al-ʻAdeni, Saʻīd ben David (2010). Pinhas Qorah (ed.). Commentary of Rabbeinu Saʻīd ben David al-ʻAdeni (in Hebrew). Kiryat Sefer.
- Alfasi, I. (1960). Yosef Qafih (ed.). R. Yitzhak al-Fasi's Commentary on Tractate Hullin (Chapter Kol ha-Basar) (in Hebrew). ha-Agudah le-Hatzalat Ginzei Teiman. OCLC 745065428.
- Al-Naddaf, A. (1981), "Questions & Responsa 'Zichronei Ish'", in Saadia al-Naddaf (ed.), 'Anaf Ḥayyim, Jerusalem
- Amar, Zohar (2017). Differing Halachic Customs between "Baladi" Yemenite and Other Jewish Communities (ספר החילוקים בין בני תימן לבין בני הצפון) (in Hebrew). Neve Tzuf. ISBN 978-965-90891-2-3. OCLC 992702131.
- Amram Gaon (1971). Daniel Goldschmidt (ed.). Seder Rav Amram Gaon (in Hebrew). Mossad Harav Kook. OCLC 19187030.
- Arussi, Ratzon [in Hebrew] (1986), "The Polemical Responsa touching the Blessing when Breaking Bread at a Supper where many are Reclined", in Yehuda Levi Nahum; Yosef Tobi (eds.), Tzohar le'ḥasifath ginzei teiman (in Hebrew), Tel-Aviv, OCLC 615200258
- Bashiri, Y. (1964). Yosef Ḥubara (ed.). Sefer Ha-Tiklāl (Tiklāl Qadmonim) (in Hebrew). Jerusalem.
- Dhahiri, Z. (1991), "Ṣeidah la'derekh (Victuals for the Road)", in Yosef Ḥasid (ed.), Taj – Ḥamishah Ḥūmshei Torah, with Commentaries (Pentateuch) (in Hebrew), vol. 1–2, Jerusalem: Ḥasid publishers
- Gaimani, Aharon (2005). Changes in the Heritage of Yemenite Jewry under the Influence of the Shulhan 'Arukh and the Kabbalah of R. Yitshaq Luria (in Hebrew). Ramat-Gan: Bar-Ilan University. OCLC 295009129. (ISBN 965226251X)
- Gaimani, Aharon (2014), "Three Rulings in One Responsum of Rabbi Yihya Qafih, of Blessed Memory", in Yosef Tobi (ed.), Tehuda (in Hebrew), vol. 30, Netanya
- Gamliel, Shalom, ed. (1988), Al-Jāma' - Ha-Ma'asef, Hebrew-Arabic lexicon, Jerusalem: Mechon Shalom Le-Shivtei Yeshurun
- Gavra, Moshe [in Hebrew] (1988). Studies in the Yemenite Prayerbook (the Passover Haggadah) (in Hebrew). Vol. 1. Kiryat Ono (Israel): Ha-Makhon le-ḥeḳer ḥakhme Teman ṿe-khitvehem. OCLC 26195663.
- Gavra, Moshe [in Hebrew] (2010). Meḥqarim basiddurei tayman (Studies in the Prayer Books of Yemen) (in Hebrew). Vol. 1–4. Benei Barak. OCLC 754753878.
- Golb, N. (1972). Spertus College of Judaica — Yemenite Manuscripts (an illustrative catalogue). Chicago: Spertus College Judaica Press. OCLC 468919157.
- Greidi, S. (1987). Limud Torah Be-Teman (The Study of Torah in Yemen) (in Hebrew) (2nd ed.). Jerusalem. OCLC 319723828.
- Greidi, S. (1995). Sefer Yamim Yedaberu: Ketivah, Arikhah, Hadpessah—1933–1993 (in Hebrew). Tel-Aviv/Jaffa.
- Ibn Ghiyyat (1861), "Me'ah She'arim", in Yitzḥaq Dov Halevi Bomberger (ed.), Sefer Sha'arei Simchah, vol. 1, Firta: Simcha Halevi, OCLC 780181558
- Isaac, E.; Tobi, Yosef, eds. (1999), "Introduction", Judaeo-Yemenite Studies - Proceedings of the Second International Congress, Princeton, New Jersey: Princeton University
- Maimonides (1974). Sefer Mishneh Torah - HaYad Ha-Chazakah (Maimonides' Code of Jewish Law) (in Hebrew). Vol. 1–7. Jerusalem: Pe'er HaTorah.
- Maimonides (1985), "Seder ha-Tefillah", in Qafih, Y. (ed.), Sefer Mishneh Torah (in Hebrew), vol. 2, Kiryat-Ono: Mekhon mishnat ha-Rambam, pp. 712–734, OCLC 19158717
- Meiri (2006). Beit ha-Beḥirah (in Hebrew). Vol. 1. Jerusalem.
- Qafih, Y. (1958). "Ha-Rambam we-golath teiman". Sinai (in Hebrew). Jerusalem: Mossad Harav Kook.
- Qafih, Y. (1982). Halichot Teman (Jewish Life in Sanà) (in Hebrew). Jerusalem: Ben-Zvi Institute. ISBN 965-17-0137-4. (OCLC 863513860)
- Qafih, Y., ed. (1985), Sefer Mishneh Torah (in Hebrew), vol. 2, Kiryat-Ono: Mekhon Mishnat ha-Rambam, OCLC 19158717
- Qafih, Y. (1989). Yosef Tobi (ed.). Collected Papers (Ketavim) (in Hebrew). Vol. 1–2. Jerusalem: E'ele BeTamar. OCLC 61623627.
- Qafih, Y. (2010). Siaḥ Yerushalayim (Siddur) (in Hebrew). Vol. 1 (7th ed.). Kiryat-Ono: Mekhon Mishnat ha-Rambam. OCLC 64742452.
- Qafih, Y., ed. (2011), "Hil. Ḥametz u'matzah", Sefer Mishneh Torah (in Hebrew), vol. 4 (Zemanim) (4 ed.), Kiryat Ono: Mekhon mishnat ha-Rambam, OCLC 187478401
- Qafih, Y. (2018), "Yemenite Jewry's Connections with Major Jewish Centers", in Rachel Yedid; Danny Bar-Maoz (eds.), Ascending the Palm Tree – An Anthology of the Yemenite Jewish Heritage, Rehovot: E'ele BeTamar, OCLC 1041776317
- Qorah, A. (1987). Shimon Greidi (ed.). Sa'arat Teiman (in Hebrew) (2nd ed.). Jerusalem. OCLC 233096108.
- Razhaby, Yehuda [in Hebrew] (1981). "Reflections on the Development of the "Yemen-Mahzor"". Alei Sefer: Studies in Bibliography and in the History of the Printed and the Digital Hebrew Book (in Hebrew): 104–105. JSTOR 24164323.
- Ratzaby, Yehuda [in Hebrew] (2018), "Ancient Customs of the Yemenite-Jewish Community", in Rachel Yedid; Danny Bar-Maoz (eds.), Ascending the Palm Tree – An Anthology of the Yemenite Jewish Heritage, Rehovot: E'ele BeTamar, OCLC 1041776317
- Ratzaby, Yitzhak [in Hebrew] (1996). Commentary on the Passover Haggadah - from the 'Tiklāl Eṣ Ḥayim' (Yemenite version) (in Hebrew) (2nd ed.). Benei Barak.
- Ratzaby, Yitzhak [in Hebrew] (2001). Sefer Shulhan Arukh Ha-mequtzar (in Hebrew). Vol. 3 (Orach Chaim). Benei Barak.
- Salaḥ, Y. (1894). Tiklāl ʿEṣ Ḥayyim (in Hebrew). Vol. 1–2. Jerusalem.
- Salaḥ, Y. (1979). Questions & Responsa 'Pe'ulath Ṣadīq' (in Hebrew). Vol. 1–3 (2nd ed.). Jerusalem. OCLC 122773689. (OCLC 122773689)
- Salaḥ, Y. (1979b). Shimon Tzalach (ed.). The Complete 'Tiklal 'Eṣ Ḥayyim (in Hebrew). Vol. 1–4. Jerusalem: Ḳeren Agudat ha-Maharits. OCLC 122866057.
- Salaḥ, Y. (1993). Yitzhak Ratzaby (ed.). Pisqei Maharitz (in Hebrew). Vol. 1–6. Benei Barak.
- Sassoon, D.S. (1924). Bo'ī Teman (in Hebrew). Budapest: Meshulam Zalman u-Menaḥem ha-Kohen Ḳaṭtsburg. OCLC 56776926.
- Sassoon, D.S. (1932). Ohel Dawid - Descriptive Catalogue of the Hebrew and Samaritan Manuscripts in the Sassoon Library. Vol. 1–2. London: Oxford University Press. OCLC 912964204.
- Shabazi (1986). Binyamin Oded (ed.). Tiklāl Mashta—Shabazi (in Hebrew). Vol. 1–2 (facsimile ed.). Jerusalem / Kefar-Saba. OCLC 24067521.
- Sharvit, Shim'on (1995). "Yemenite Customs in Reciting Tractate Avoth on Shabbath". TEMA - Journal of Judeo-Yemenite Studies (in Hebrew) (5). Netanya: Association for Society and Culture. OCLC 73226060.
- Tobi, Yosef; Seri, Shalom, eds. (2000). Yalqut Teman - Lexicon of Yemenite Jewry (in Hebrew). Tel-Aviv: E'eleh betamar. p. 190. OCLC 609321911.
- Tobi, Yosef [in Hebrew] (2001). "The Prayer-rite of the Jews of Yemen". TEMA - Journal of Judeo-Yemenite Studies (in Hebrew) (7). Netanya: Association for Society and Culture. OCLC 73226060.
- Wannah, Yitzhak (1992). Yitzhak Ratzaby (ed.). Rekhev Elohim (in Hebrew). Benei Barak.
- Yitzḥak Halevi, Shalom [in Hebrew] (1993). Avner Yitzhak Halevi (ed.). Sefer ha-Zikaron - Divrei Shalom Ḥakhamim (in Hebrew). Jerusalem: Ner Avishalom, Bet Yitsḥaḳ Halevi. OCLC 123002600.
