= Yiḥyah Salaḥ =

Yemeni Rabbi

Rabbi Yiḥya Ṣāleḥ (alternative spellings: Yichya Tzalach; Yehiya Saleh), known by the acronym of Maharitz (Hebrew: מוהר"ר יחיא צאלח, Moreinu HaRav Yichya Tzalach), (1713 – 1805), was one of the greatest exponents of Jewish law known to Yemen. He is the author of a liturgical commentary entitled Etz Ḥayyim (The Tree of Life), in which he follows closely the legal dicta of Maimonides. Rabbi Yiḥya Ṣāleḥ is widely remembered for his ardent work in preserving Yemenite Jewish customs and traditions, which he articulated so well in his many writings, but also for his adopting certain Spanish rites and liturgies that had already become popular in Yemen. In this regard, he was strongly influenced by the Rabbis of his previous generation, Rabbi Yehudah Sa'adi and Rabbi Yihya al-Bashiri. Initially, Rabbi Yiḥya Ṣāleḥ worked as a blacksmith until the age of thirty, after which he worked as a scrivener of sacred texts (Heb. "sofer"), before becoming chief jurist of the rabbinical court (Beth Din) in Sanaa.

== Life and Works ==
Yiḥya was born in the lunar month of Cheshvan, in the year 5474 anno mundi, a year corresponding to 1713 CE, to Joseph b. Ṣāliḥ. Ṣāliḥ, his grandfather (d. 1749), was a survivor of the infamous Mawza Exile, the founder of the Saleh synagogue in Sanaa and one of the city's judges and ritual slaughterers (Heb. shochet). Although Rabbi Yiḥya Ṣāliḥ would later serve as chief judge (Av Beit-Din) and President of the rabbinical court at Ṣanʻā’, for most of his life he worked under the shadow of two great men of his generation: the illustrious Rabbi David Mishreqi (d. 1771), the author of Shtilei Zeitim, a commentary on the Shulhan Arukh (Orach Chaim and Yoreh De'ah), and Rabbi Shalom Iraqi al-Cohen (1685–1780), called al-'Ousṭā (the artisan), the comptroller of the customs and surveyor-general of the royal buildings and gardens who had been the favorite of two successive kings, although demoted in 1761.

Rabbi Yiḥya Ṣāleḥ was contemporary with Rabbi Chaim Joseph David Azulai, a great rabbinic teacher and scholar, with whom he maintained correspondence when the latter lived in Egypt. Rabbi Yiḥye Ṣāleḥ (henceforth: Maharitz) is the author of the Questions and Responsa, Pe'ūlath Ṣadīq and has also written a brief but comprehensive commentary on the Yemenite Baladi-rite Prayer Book, entitled ‘Eṣ Ḥayyim in which appears the responsum addressed to him from Rabbi Chaim Joseph David Azulai. Maharitz also compiled a work on Bible orthography (Hebrew vowels and trope symbols used in biblical texts) known as Ḥeleq Hadiqdūq, among other writings (see: infra).

Little is known about Maharitz's father, Yosef Ṣāleḥ, except that he studied under his wife's father, Rabbi David Qafih. Rabbi Suleiman, Maharitz's brother, is known to have compiled a work on the laws governing the Passover preparation, known as Zevaḥ Pesaḥ. Maharitz's family is reported to have traced their lineage back to Oved, one of the progeny of Peretz, the son of Judah.

== Scholarship ==
Maharitz was gifted at an early age with a good memory and quickly developed his learning skills. As a young man, he studied under the tutelage of his father and grandfather, Ṣāleḥ Ṣāleḥ, and at one point served under the great rabbinic teacher and scholar of his day, Rabbi David Mishreqi (1696–1771), the author of the commentary, "Shtilei Zeitim," on the Shulhan Arukh. His influence over the young Maharitz must have been astounding, for Maharitz mentions him in his Questions & Responsa:

"…This practice [of not shaving one's head during the first thirty-three days of the counting of the 'Omer] has spread in several places. But in this, our place, the land of Yemen, they did not have this practice, while it has only been recent (approximately forty years) that a certain wise man from the isles of the sea did come forth, and while he was passing through our city, he did compel the public to practise the same from the argument that it is a prohibition [rather than a custom], and actually forbade them against their will! And, lo! The great Rabbi, Rabbi David Ben-Zimra, and Rabbi Menahem Lunzano, wrote that several communities shave their heads each Sabbath eve (Friday) out of respect for the Sabbath…

…It has now been about twelve years since we re-enacted this practice of shaving one's head [during the counting of the `Omer], that is, a few of the more zealous ones amongst us, in accordance with the instruction of our teacher and Rabbi, even the honorable teacher and Rabbi, David Mishreqi, whose inheritance is in the Garden of Eden, who was the most able Rabbi of the city, and who did practice the same, by himself, and so did I practice the same, and many others with me. Now the proper rule of conduct is thus, to be inclined after the Rabbi of one's generation, as it is written: 'and unto the judge' (Deut. 17:9), even if it were a thing which stood contrary to the first custom, the Law has given him authority to decide in such matters as his eyes shall see fit, in order to put the matter in question in its rightful place, and by his mouth shall they encamp, and by his mouth shall they journey, just as RASHDAM (R. Shemuel Di Medina) has written, in Yoreh De'ah, Section 40."

It is largely accepted by scholars that Maharitz underwent a change of heart in circa 1776 (between 1775–1779), whereas before this time he had adhered largely to Sephardic customs introduced in Yemen, but afterwards he had returned to fully embrace the earlier Yemenite traditions and liturgies that had been practised in Yemen.

== Persecution ==
Rabbi Yiḥya Ṣāleḥ (Maharitz) seemed to have kept a low profile during the persecutions which affected the Jewish community of Sanaa in 1761, at which time twelve of the city's fourteen synagogues were demolished by order of the king, Al-Mahdi Abbas. The reason for the king's displeasure is not presently known, but the community's respected leader who was entrusted with the role of mediating between the king and the people, Rabbi Shalom Cohen al-Iraqi (who bore the title of Nasi, or Prince), and who had served under two kings from 1733 to 1761, was imprisoned and held in bonds until he could pay a high ransom for his release. At the same time, writs then issuing from the king forbade Jews in the city from building their houses higher than fourteen cubits (about 7.5 meters; 24.8 feet)..

== Halacha - Jewish legal law ==
Maharitz at first decided Halacha according to the position of the Shulchan Aruch, but later changed his approach in order to uphold Yemenite Jewish traditions and which were more aligned with the Halachic rulings of Maimonides (Rambam). In this decision, he was influenced by Rabbi Yehudah al-Ṣa'adi and Rabbi Pinḥas Iraqi HaKohen, men of the previous generation who fought to maintain and to preserve the old Yemenite Jewish prayer rite amidst trends to change over to the Spanish-rite. Concerning this troublesome time, Amram Qorah writes:

"Then were those Rabbis awakened who had always prayed in the Baladi-rite (Tiklāl), the head of whom was Rabbi Yehudah b. Shelomo al-Ṣa'adi, and the Judge, Rabbi Pinḥas b. Shelomo HaKohen al-Iraqi, of blessed memory, and they wrote proclamations in the form of rabbinic decrees saying that it is forbidden to change the customs of one's fathers which were established according to the words of the Geonim of old, and [according to] the 'Composition' left to us by Maimonides who came after them."

Following in the footsteps of Rabbi David Abudirham, Rabbi Yiḥya Saleh wrote an extensive commentary on the synagogue liturgy and the old Yemenite Jewish Prayer Book in which he mostly upholds the old practices described therein (e.g. the practice of saying only one Mussaf-prayer during Rosh Hashanah, etc.), although he also compromises by introducing elements in the Yemenite prayer book taken from the books of the kabbalists and the Shulchan Aruch. He is often seen praising the old Yemenite customs and encouraging their upkeep:

... I have also with me a responsum concerning the matter of changing our prayer custom, which is in the Tikālil (Baladi-rite Prayer Books) for the version found in the Spanish-rite Prayer Books, from the Rabbi, [even] our teacher, Rabbi Pinḥas Ha-Kohen Iraqi, ... and he has been most vociferous in his language against those who would change [their custom], with reproofs and [harsh] decrees in a language that isn't very cajoling. May his soul be laid up in paradise....

Still, Maharitz's endorsement of certain Halachic rulings found in the Shulchan Aruch was the cause for some Yemenite Jewish prayer-rites being cancelled altogether, and for other extraneous customs introduced by the kabbalists being added thereto. For a broader discussion on this subject, see Baladi-rite Prayer.

== Death and legacy ==
Maharitz died on Saturday, the 28th day of the lunar month Nisan, 5565 anno mundi (1805 CE), in Ṣanʻā’, Yemen, and was succeeded by his son, Rabbi Abraham, in the post of chief judge (Av Beit-Din) and President of the court.

Among his books were:

- Pe'ūlath Ṣadiq (Questions & Responsa)
- ‘Eṣ Ḥayyim (Commentary on the tiklal (Yemenite Baladi-rite Siddur)
- Ḥeleq Hadiqduq (Orthography of biblical texts)
- Me'il Qaṭan (Commentary on a work written by Rabbi Yeshayahu Halevi Horowitz)
- Sha'arei Ṭaharah (laws of Niddah = the Menstruate Woman), in Arabic)
- Zevaḥ Todah (Concerning the laws of Ritual Slaughter, known as shechitah)
- Sha'arei Qedushah (A condensed work on Ritual Slaughter and the laws governing defects in the animal)
- Oraḥ LaḤayyim (Commentary on the Five Megillot).

== See also ==
- Virtual library at Maharitz.co.il including many of the Maharitz's books
