= Torah scroll (Yemenite) =

Yemenite Jewish tradition of orthography in a Torah scroll

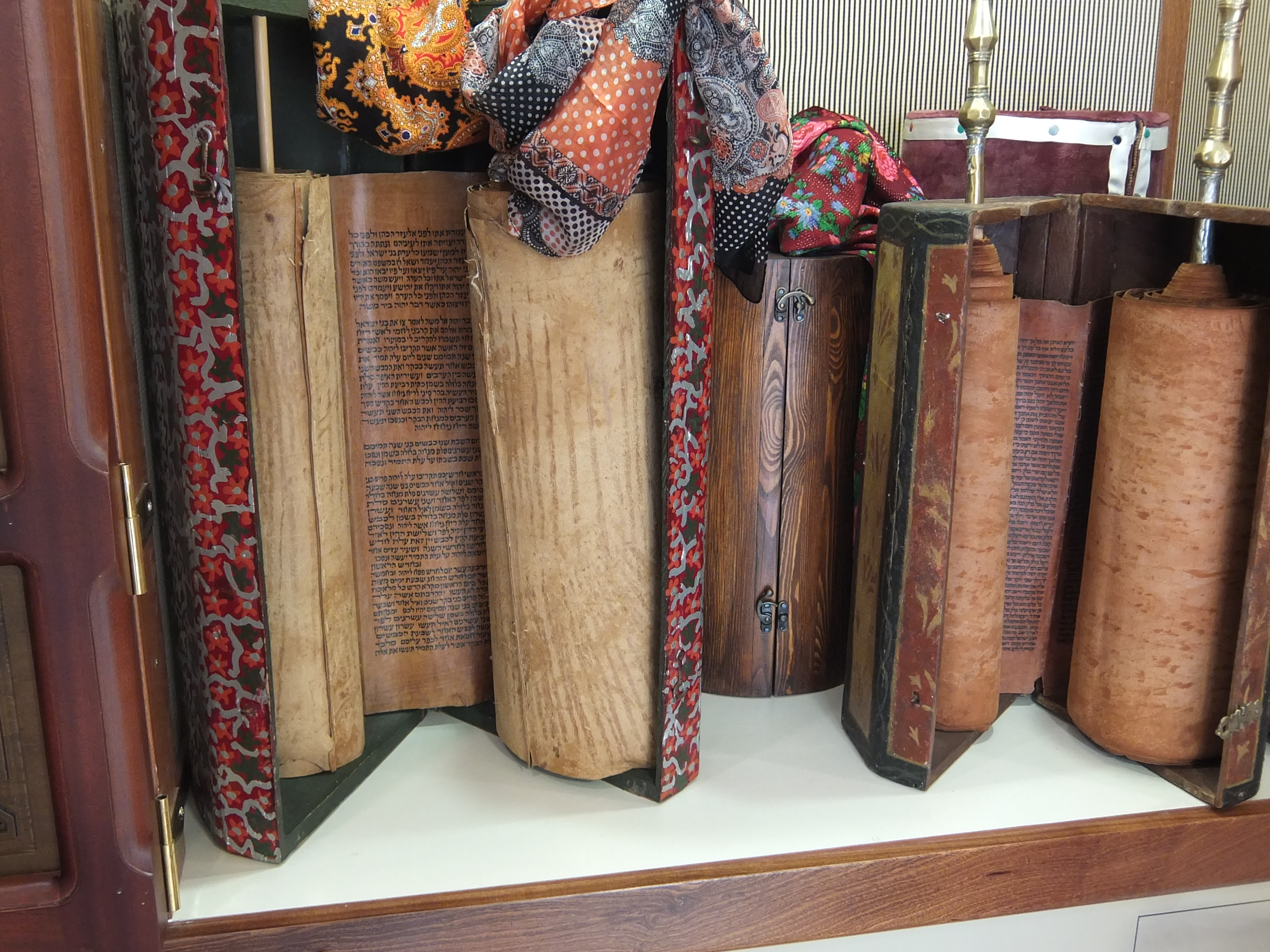
Yemenite Torah scrolls

Yemenite scrolls of the Law containing the Five Books of Moses (the Torah) represent one of three authoritative scribal traditions for the transmission of the Torah, the other two being the Ashkenazi and Sephardic traditions that slightly differ. While all three traditions purport to follow the Masoretic traditions of Aaron ben Moses ben Asher, slight differences between the three major traditions have developed over the years. Biblical texts proofread by ben Asher survive in two extant codices (the Aleppo Codex and the Leningrad Codex), the latter said to have only been patterned after texts proofread by Ben Asher. The former work, although more precise, was partially lost following its removal from Aleppo in 1947.

The Yemenite Torah scroll is unique in that it contains many of the oddly-formed letters, such as the "curled" pe (פ) and the "crooked" lamed (ל), etc., mentioned in Sefer Tagae, as also by Menachem Meiri and by Maimonides, although not found in ben Asher's orthography. The old line arrangements employed by the early Yemenite scribes in their Torah scrolls are nearly the same as prescribed by ben Asher. Like ben Asher's Masoretic tradition, it also contains nearly all the plene and defective scriptum, as well as the large and small letters employed in the writing of the Torah, a work held by medieval scribes in Israel to be the most accurate of all Masoretic traditions.

The disputes between ben Asher and Ben Naphtali are well-known to Hebrew grammarians. Maimonides' verdict in that dispute is in accordance with ben Asher.

The codex that we have relied upon in these matters is the well-known codex in Egypt, comprising twenty-four canonical books, [and] which was in Jerusalem for several years to proof-read the scrolls there from, and all [of Israel] used to rely upon it, since Ben-Asher had proof-read it and scrutinized it for many years, and proof-read it many times, just as they had copied down. Now, upon it, I relied with regard to the book of the Law that I wrote, according to the rules which govern its proper writing.

Maimonides' ruling in this regard eventually caused the Jews of Yemen to abandon their former system of orthography, and during his lifetime most scribes in Yemen had already begun to replace their former system of orthography for that of Ben-Asher. Scribes in Yemen, especially the illustrious Benayah family of scribes of the 15th and 16th centuries, patterned their own codices containing the proper orthography, vocalization and accentuation after Maimonides' accepted practice in his Sefer Torah, who, in turn, had based his Torah-scroll on Ben-Asher's orthography, with especial attention given to the line arrangements of the two Prosaic Songs mentioned by him, the Open and Closed sections of the Torah, and plene and defective scriptum. Such codices were disseminated all throughout Yemen. The tījān (codices) were copied with particular care, since they were intended as model texts from which scribes would copy Torah scrolls, with the one exception that in the Torah scrolls themselves they contained no vocalization and accentuations. In most of these tījān, every three pages equalled one column in the Sefer Torah. A recurring avowal appears in nearly all copies of codices penned by the Benayah family, namely, that the codex which lay before the reader was written "completely according to the arrangement of the book that was in Egypt, which was edited by Ben Asher...." Based on the preceding lines of this avowal, the reference is to the Open and Closed sections that were copied from the section on orthography in the Yemenite MS. of Maimonides’ Mishneh Torah, a work which Maimonides himself claims to have been based on Ben-Asher (i.e. the Aleppo Codex), universally recognized since the time of Maimonides as the most accurate recension of the Hebrew Bible. Benayah’s use of this avowal simply mirrors the words of Maimonides in his Hilkhot Sefer Torah, while most scholars doubt if he had actually seen a codex proofread by Ben-Asher. Others say that the avowal merely refers to the Tiberian masoretic tradition (vowels and accentuations) adopted by the Benayah family in their codices.

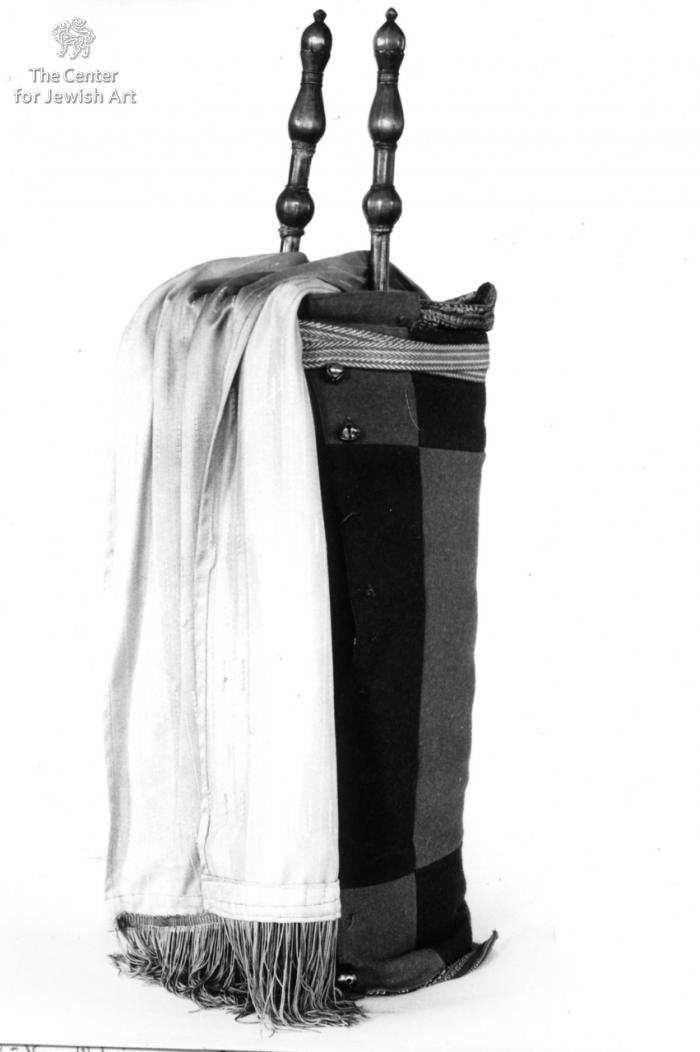
Yemenite Torah case with finials

== Layout ==
The Yemenite scroll of the Torah is traditionally written on 51 lines to each column, for a total of 226 columns (רכ"ו דפים), a tradition that differs from Ashkenazi and Sephardic scrolls which are historically written in anywhere from 42 to 98 lines (42 lines since the mid-20th century). Unique to Yemenite scrolls, based on what is prescribed in their codices, is that each column concludes with the end of a particular verse and begins with the start of a new verse; never broken in the middle. Each column starts with the opening lines of a new verse, excepting in only six designated places, whose mnemonics are בי"ה שמ"ו (see infra), and excepting in the two prosaic songs (the Song of the Sea and Ha'azinu), where the columns in these places begin in the middle of a verse. These six places (five places when בראשית of Gen. 1:1 is excluded, since it is only used to form the mnemonic) are the only exceptions to the rule, and which practice is intended to ensure uniformity and exactness in the scribal practice and layout in the Sefer Torah throughout all generations. The average width of each column is approximately four finger-breadths, usually 9.3 centimetres (3.7 in), with a space of 3.7 centimetres (1.5 in) between columns. Columns containing the Prosaic Songs are considerably wider to facilitate the writing of the song in its usual format. For the Prosaic Song Ha'azinu, the first column which contains the song is made ca. 14 centimetres (5.5 in) in width, while the second column that concludes the song is made ca. 14.9 centimetres (5.9 in) in width. For the Prosaic Song of the Sea the column measures approximately 14 centimetres (5.5 in) in width. The sheets of parchment used in making the scroll measure approximately 54.7 centimetres (21.5 in) in length (from top to bottom), although varying in width, with at least three columns to each sheet. Most are made with full-grain leather (Heb. ğawīl), that is, leather where the "split" layer has not been removed from it. In Yemen, the custom was to treat the raw hide with a tannin-solution made from the leaves of Acacia etbaica (Arabic: qarāḍ) to ensure the leather's lasting durability. This also gave to the leather a reddish-brown luster. The sheets of parchment were traditionally sewn together with sinews (tendons) taken from the animal's loins (flanks), rather than from the animal's heels (the latter being prescribed by Maimonides).

== Plene and defective scriptum ==
There are thirteen orthographic traditions in the first category which are peculiar to the Yemenite tradition and which differ from the traditions borne by other groups. The Yemenite arrangement has been published in many sources, the most notable of which being that of the last Chief Rabbi of Yemen, Rabbi Amram Qorah. By a comparative study, the Yemenite tradition in plene and defective scriptum is nearly in complete harmony with that of the Aleppo Codex which was proofread by the masorete, Ben-Asher.

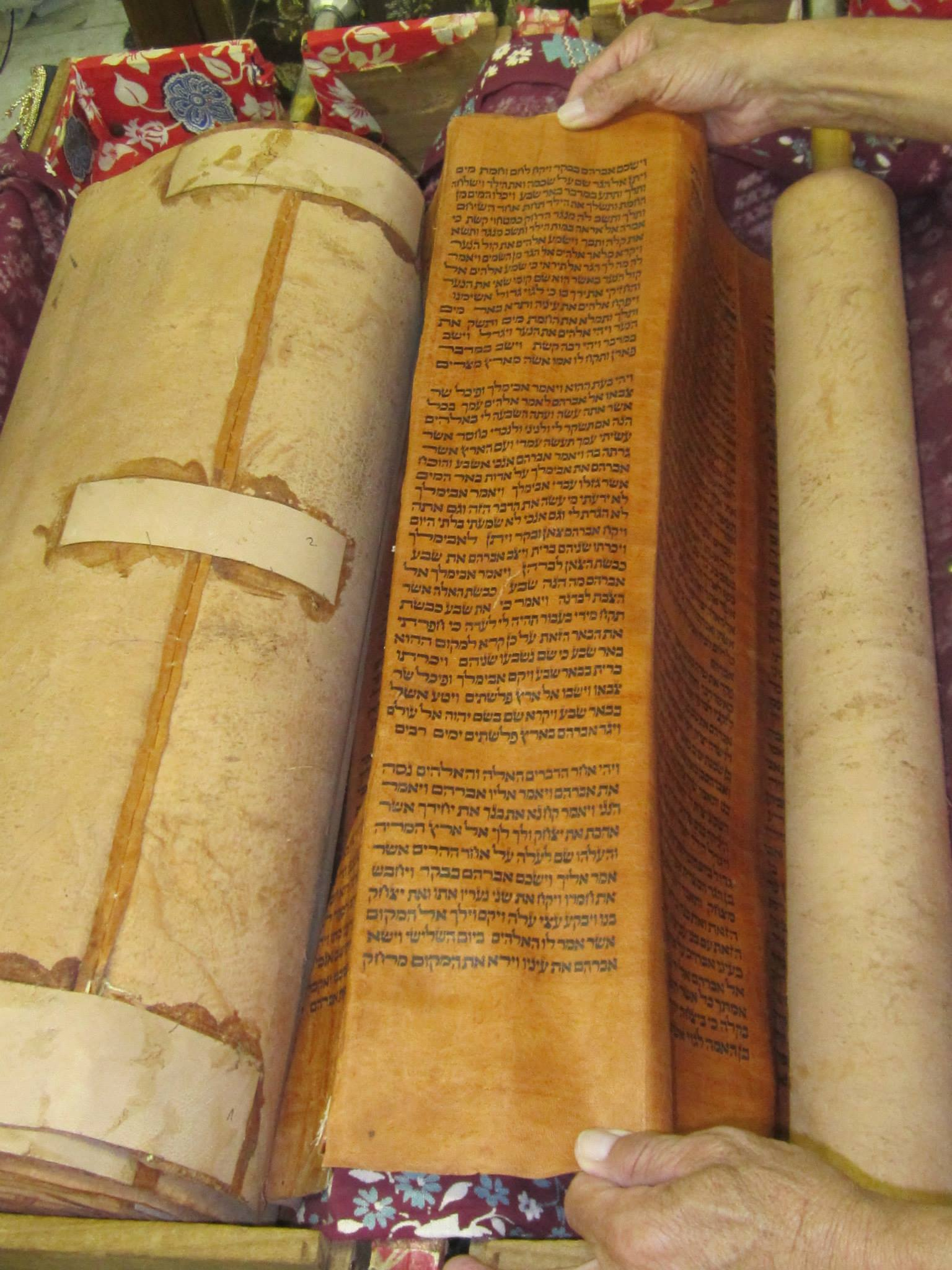
200 year old gevil Yemenite Torah scroll housed at the Rambam Synagogue in Nahalat Ahim, Jerusalem.

Verses	Content	Change
	Genesis (בראשית)	
4:13	גדול עוני מנשא	The word מנשא is written without a "waw" (defective scriptum)
7:11	נבקעו כל מעינת	The word מעינת is written without a "waw" (defective scriptum)
9:29	ויהיו כל ימי נח	The word ויהיו is written as a plural with a final "waw"
41:45	פוטיפרע	Every פוטיפרע is written as one word
	Exodus (שמות)	
25:31	תעשה המנורה	The word תעשה is written without a "yod" (defective scriptum)
28:26	אל עבר האפד	The word האפד is written without a "waw" (defective scriptum)
	Leviticus (ויקרא)	
7:22–23	פרשת כל חלב	This section is written as an "Open Section"
7:28–29	פרשת המקריב	This is neither a "Closed" nor an "Open" Section
	Numbers (במדבר)	
1:17	אשר נקבו בשמת	The word בשמת is written without a "waw" (defective scriptum)
10:10	ובראשי חדשיכם	The word חדשיכם is written with a "yod" (plene scriptum)
22:5	בלעם בן בער	The word בער is written without a "waw" (defective scriptum)
25:12	בריתי שלום	The letter "waw" in שלום is written as all other "waws" (without shortening)
	Deuteronomy (דברים)	
23:2	פצוע דכא	The word דכא is written with an "aleph", instead of "he."

The prevailing view is that if there is found a Torah scroll that has not been written as prescribed in all of the above (as bequeathed by the ancients) then that same scroll is invalid (lowered in sanctity) and is considered as merely one of the codices (Heb. ḥūmashin).

== Irregular letters ==
Rabbi Yitzhak Razhabi has noted that in the Yemenite Jewish tradition there are over 400 peculiar types of letters (special forms of certain characters) in the Torah and which have been largely adhered to by Yemenite scribes. While these irregular letters do not invalidate a Torah scroll if they had been neglected, the scribes in Yemen still strictly adhered to its practice.

=== The Large Letters ===
The Yemenite tradition of writing the Otiyyot Gedolot (Large Letters) in the Torah differs in some respects from other communities, and follows the traditions as they received them from the scribes of old. The following is a list of all the Large Letters found in the Yemenite scroll of the Pentateuch (Five Books of Moses), as published by 17th century Yemenite scribe, Rabbi Yihye Bashiri, in his book, Havatzelet Hasharon:

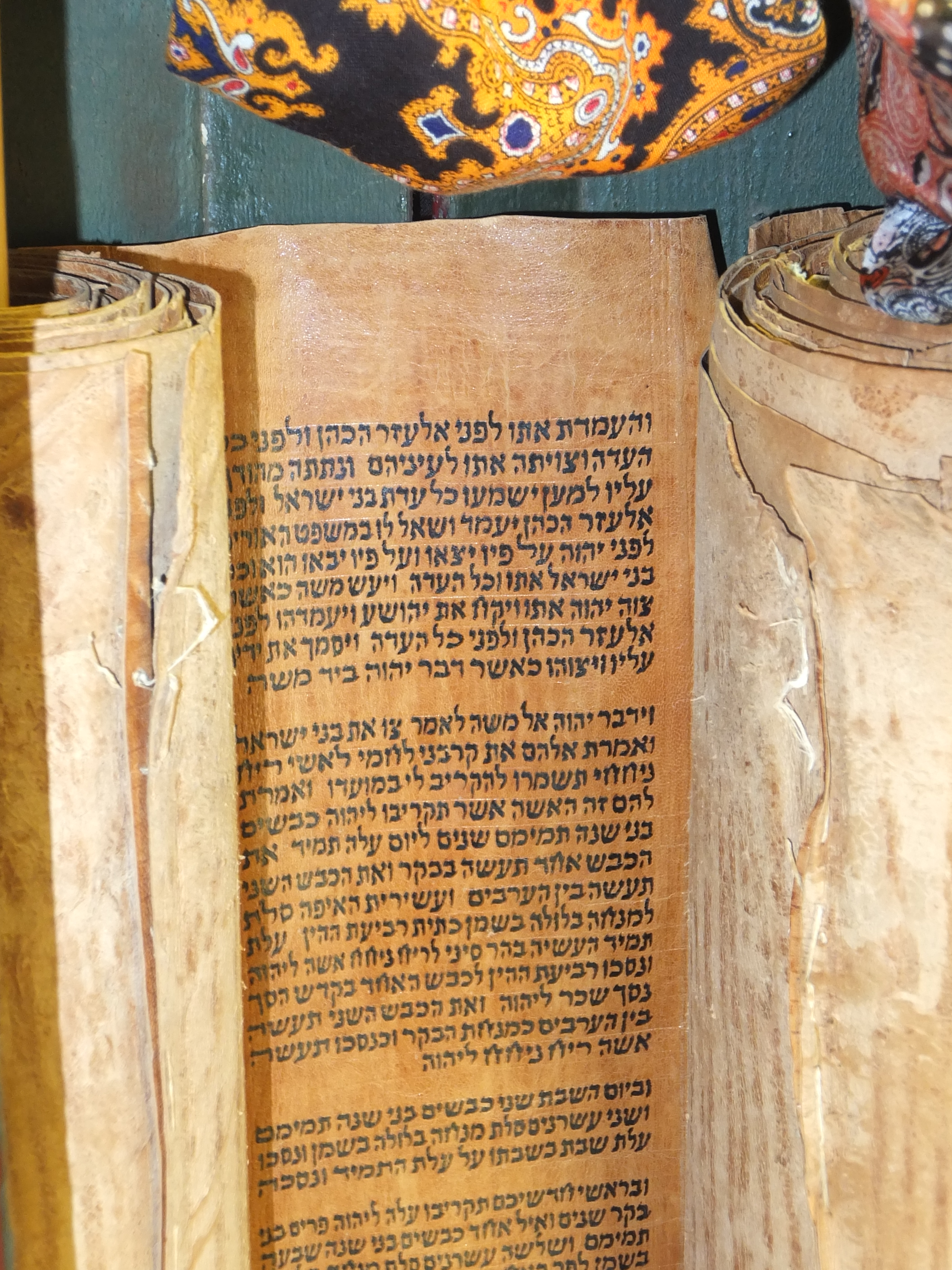
A sheet of leather parchment (Torah)

Verses	Content	Change
	Genesis (בראשית)	
1:1	בראשית	The letter "bet" (ב) of "breishit" (בראשית) is written in large script
5:1	זה ספר תולדת אדם	The letter "semakh" (ס) of "sefer" (ספר) is written in large script
	Exodus (שמות)	
34:14	לא תשתחוה לאל אחר	The letter "resh" (ר) of "aḥer" (אחר) is written in large script
	Leviticus (ויקרא)	
11:42	כל הולך על גחון	The letter "waw" (ו) of "ğaḥon" (גחון) is written in large script
13:33	והתגלח ואת הנתק	The letter "ğimel" (ג) of "wehithğalaḥ" (והתגלח) is written in large script
	Numbers (במדבר)	
14:17	ועתה יגדל נא כח אדני	The letter "yod" (י) of "yigdal" (יגדל) is written in large script
27:5	ויקרב משה את משפטן	The letter "nun" (נ) of "mishpaṭan" (משפטן) is written in large script
	Deuteronomy (דברים)	
6:4	שמע ישראל יי' אלהינו	The letter "ayin" (ע) of "shǝma" (שמע) is written in large script
6:4	יי' אלהינו יי' אחד	The letter "daleth" (ד) of "eḥad" (אחד) is written in large script
11:21	כימי השמים על הארץ	The letter "ṣadi" (ץ) of "ha'areṣ" (הארץ) is written in large script
22:6	קן צפור	The letter "qof" (ק) of "qen" (קן) is written in large script
29:27	וישלכם אל ארץ אחרת	The letter "lamed" (ל) of "wayashlikhem" (וישלכם) is written in large script
32:6	הליי' תגמלו זאת	The letter "he" (ה) of "haladonai" (הליי) is written in large script
33:29	אשריך ישראל מי כמוך	The letter "aleph" (א) of "ashrekha" (אשריך) is written in large script

Unlike the scribal tradition of Ashkenaz and Sepharad which is to make the nun (נ) of נצר חסד לאלפים in Exodus 34:7 of large size, in the Yemenite Jewish tradition the nun is of regular size. Rabbi Yihye Bashiri, in his Havatzelet HaSharon, brings down other traditions concerning the writing of large and small letters in the Torah scroll, but which traditions were not practised in Yemen, and therefore ought to be reckoned as his sole opinion (since they are not mentioned by the renowned Yemenite scribe David Benayah, neither are they written in the Hibshoosh Codex, nor mentioned by the last Chief Rabbi of Yemen, Rabbi Amram Qorah, or in the vast majority of Yemenite codices. Rabbi Yihye Bashiri had, apparently, culled these other traditions from the writings of the kabbalists and other rabbinic scholars outside of Yemen, and wished to incorporate them in the Yemenite tradition, but which practices had never taken hold in Yemen.

=== The Small Letters ===
Verses	Content	Change
	Genesis (בראשית)	
2:4	אלה תולדות השמים והארץ בהבראם	The letter "he" (ה) of "behibar'am" (בהבראם) is written in small script
23:2	ובא אברהם לספד לשרה ולבכתה	The letter "kaph" (כ) of "walivkothah" (ולבכתה) is written in small script
27:46	קצתי בחיי מפני בנות חת	The letter "qof" (ק) of "qaṣti" (קצתי) is written in small script
	Leviticus (ויקרא)	
1:1	ויקרא אל משה וידבר	The letter "aleph" (א) of "wayiqra" (ויקרא) is written in small script
	Deuteronomy (דברים)	
32:18	צור ילדך תשי	The letter "yod" (י) of "teshi" (תשי) is written in small script

Unlike the scribal tradition of Ashkenaz and Sepharad which is to make the mem (מ) of על מוקדה in Leviticus 6:2 of small size, in the Yemenite Jewish tradition the mem is of regular size. Likewise, the letter "yod" in the word פינחס (Numbers 25:10) is written in regular size in the Yemenite tradition, unlike the tradition of other communities who make it small.

=== Oddly-shaped letters ===
According to Rashi, the final nun (ן) in וימת תרח בחרן (Gen. 11:32) is to be written upside down, although this was never a practice in the Yemenite Jewish tradition. Instead, the final nun here was written in its ordinary fashion. In other places, however, the Yemenites have preserved the practice of making oddly-shaped letters, where the tradition called for doing so. The Yemenite tradition calls for making 154 overlapping pe`s (פ) in their designated places, with the mouth recoiling inwards upon itself (made by a very thin nib of the pen).

Zechariah ha-Rofé (15th century), in his Midrash ha-Hefez, brings down eight places in the Torah where, in each case, a word is written with an irregular-shaped letter, and those being: a) ף in אף of Gen. 3:1; b) ל in וילבשם of Gen. 3:21; c) ל in וישלחהו of Gen. 3:23; d) ל in להט החרב of Gen. 3:24; e) ל in ויכלא הגשם of Gen. 8:2; f) ו in ואך את דמכם of Gen. 9:5; g) ך in דמו ישפך of Gen. 9:6; and h) ך in וארך of Gen. 10:10. According to Zechariah ha-Rofé, the justification for making these letters altered from their natural shapes and forms, when there is no other rational explanation for doing so, is that God went out-of-his-way to change the natural order of speech, in Gen. 7:2, so as not to utter the words "defiled animals," although it was shorter, but rather used the more protracted words "animals that are not clean," and that Israelites are to emulate him. Perhaps, too, it is alluded by these forms that in this particular biblical reading, one is to exercise extra precaution so as not to utter a disparaging remark.

The following is an abridged list of some of the common usages in Yemenite Torah scrolls.

Verses	Content	Change
	Genesis (בראשית)	
3:14	על גחנך תלך	The left leg of the "ḥet" (ח) in גחנך is widely spread out
3:18	וקוץ ודרדר תצמיח לך	The left leg of the "ḥet" (ח) is widely spread out
3:21	כתנות עור וילבשם	The head of the "lamed" (ל) (not to be confused with the neck) is extended with zig-zag strokes to the left
3:23	וישלחהו יי' אלהים	The head of the "lamed" (ל) in וישלחהו is extended with zig-zag strokes to the left
3:24	ואת להט החרב המתהפכת	The head of the "lamed" (ל) in להט is extended with zig-zag strokes to the left
4:11	את דמי אחיך מידך	The left leg of the "ḥet" (ח) in אחיך is widely spread out
7:22	רוח חיים באפיו	The left leg of the "ḥet" (ח) in חיים is widely spread out, while the "pe" (פ) in באפיו is made to recoil inwards (overlapping)
7:23	וימחו מן הארץ	The left leg of the "ḥet" (ח) in וימחו is widely spread out
27:46	קצתי בחיי מפני בנות חת	The left leg of the "ḥet" (ח) in חת is widely spread out, and the "pe" (פ) of מפני is overlapping
41:45	שם יוסף צפנת פענח	The "pe" (פ) in צפנת and in פענח are each overlapping (recoiling inwards)
41:45	אסנת בת פוטיפרע	The two "pe"s (פ) in פוטיפרע are each overlapping (recoiling inwards)
42:12	לא כי ערות הארץ באתם לראות	The bottom left leg of the "aleph" in the word לא is written with a slight inversion upwards
	Leviticus (ויקרא)	
23:28	יום כפרים הוא לכפר	The letter "pe" (פ) in כפרים and in לכפר are made overlapping
	Numbers (במדבר)	
10:35	ויהי בנסע הארן	Before and after the verse, there are two characters resembling an inverted nun
14:41	והוא לא תצלח	The left leg of the "ḥet" (ח) in תצלח is widely spread out
	Deuteronomy (דברים)	
23:21	לנכרי תשיך	The head of the letter "lamed" (ל) is inverted backwards
32:42	מראש פרעות אויב	The "pe" (פ) in פרעות is overlapping

== Prosaic Song Ha'azinu ==
Jewish scribes have preserved a carefully guarded tradition regarding the line arrangements of certain verses, namely, which words are to be written at the forefront of a line, and which words are to be written at the end of the same. The line arrangements of Shirat Ha'azinu (Deut. 32:1–43) in the Yemenite Torah scrolls follow closely that of Ben Asher as conveyed by Maimonides' Mishne Torah, and, unlike the Sephardic tradition of writing the song in seventy lines (based on the Shulhan Arukh), the Yemenite tradition is to write the song in only sixty-seven lines.

The column on the sheet of parchment containing the prosaic song Ha'azinu is made wider than other columns, so as to make room for the poem's layout, written in the format of sixty-seven double half-columns, meaning to say, spaces are made between the verses which appear to descend in two columns. The prosaic song itself is preceded by a blank space, above which are six lines that are written in a format fixed by tradition, with the following words at the head of each line: the 1st line starting with ואעידה and ending with ידעתי; the 2nd line starting with אחרי and ending with מן; the 3rd line starting with הדרך and ending with הרעה; the 4th line starting with באחרית and ending with God's divine name, יהוה; the 5th line starting with להכעיסו and ending with כל; and the 6th line starting with קהל and ending with תמם. The original Yemenite practice was to write these six short lines with indentations before and after the text of each line, rather than draw-out the lines unto the margins by stretching certain letters within the text. The scribal practice of indenting these six lines was also the widespread practice used in Turkey, in very old and exquisite Torah scrolls during the time of Rabbi Chaim Benveniste (1603–1673). After these six lines there is a space followed by the Prosaic Song, written in the format of a song. The Yemenite tradition follows the Aleppo Codex's layout of the Prosaic Song, excepting lines 38 and 39, being the only deviation in word sequence, now believed by most scholars to be an anomaly, by way of confusing the double usage of the Hebrew word גם (q.v. Deut. 32:25) and not knowing which word Maimonides actually had in mind when bringing down the condensed layout for the song. A Sephardic codex written between the 11th–12th century (now Vat. ebr. 448) shows a tradition that is identical to that of the Yemenite tradition with respect to the line arrangements in the poetic song Ha'azinu.

Arrangement of Lines in Shirat Ha'azinu (Deut. 32:25)
Lines	Aleppo Codex (written in 67 lines)
Line no. 38	עם חמת זחלי עפר .............מחוץ תשכל חרב ומחדרים אימה גם בחור
Line no. 39	גם בתולה יונק עם איש שיבה ............. אמרתי אפאיהם
Lines	Yemenite Tradition (written in 67 lines)
Line no. 38	עם חמת זחלי עפר ............. מחוץ תשכל חרב ומחדרים אימה
Line no. 39	גם בחור גם בתולה יונק עם איש שיבה ............. אמרתי אפאיהם

== Prosaic Song of the Sea ==
The "Song of the Sea" (Shirat ha-Yam) is traditionally made on lines appearing as half-bricks set over whole bricks. Rabbi Meir ben Todros Halevi (ca. 1170–1244), when trying to ascertain the correct scribal tradition, mentions his having written to Shemuel ibn Tibbon the physician of Marseille, inquiring about the scroll of the Torah that was with him and which was copied from Maimonides’ scroll of the Torah. Ibn Tibbon replied, sending to him an accurate copy of the arranged lines of the Song of the Sea (Hebrew: שירת הים) in Exodus 15:1–19 as found in the scroll that was copied from Maimonides’ Torah scroll. He writes that he found the three words, את מי הים (= "the waters of the sea"), written at the beginning of the last line. Notwithstanding, Rabbi Meir ben Todros admitted to having deviated from this tradition, having decided against its orthography, seeing that in the Song of the Sea all of the previous lines had thus far ended in one word, and it seemed fitting to him that the second to the last line should also end in one word. He therefore changed its order, by his own admittance. The author of Minḥat Shai followed in suit and also changed the original order of the last two lines in the Song of the Sea. The Yemenite Jews still maintain the old tradition in the line arrangements of the Song of the Sea, following Ben Asher's format in the words that are to begin each line, as well as in the words which are to conclude each line. Their fidelity to tradition has been praised by Dr. Penkower, a specialist of Textual Transmission of the Bible and the Masorah at the Department of the Bible in Bar-Ilan University, who wrote: "It's worthy of adding that in the Yemenite manuscripts of the Torah the arrangement of lines in the Prosaic Song of the Sea is exactly like the arrangement found in the Aleppo Codex, including the last two lines and the lines that are before the Song and that are after it."

While all communities will write the Song of the Sea (Shirat ha-Yam) on thirty lines, the format which concludes the song has been slightly altered in some communities due to the doubt raised by Rabbi Meir Abulafia ben Todros of Spain. In the old Sephardic codex (now Vat. ebr. 448), written between the 11th–12th century, it shows the arrangement of lines in the Prosaic "Song of the Sea" (Shirat ha-Yam) just as prescribed by Ben-Asher and as found in the Yemenite tradition, before Rabbi Meir b. Todros Halevi's emendation.

Layout of the Song of the Sea (last three lines)

Comparative Texts
	Line 28	Aleppo Codex
Yemenite scroll	כי (space) יהוה ימלך לעלם ועד (space) ידיך	same
Sephardic scroll	כי (space) יהוה ימלך לעלם ועד (space) ידיך	same
	Line 29	Aleppo Codex
Yemenite scroll	וישב יהוה עליהם (space) בא סוס פרעה ברכבו ובפרשיו בים	same
Sephardic scroll	וישב יהוה עליהם את מי (space) בא סוס פרעה ברכבו ובפרשיו בים	different
	Line 30	Aleppo Codex
Yemenite scroll	ובני ישראל הלכו ביבשה בתוך הים (space) את מי הים	same
Sephardic scroll	הים (space) ובני ישראל הלכו ביבשה בתוך (space) הים	different

Testimonies from travelers and emissaries who had seen the Aleppo Codex have concurred, unequivocally, that the words, כס יה in Exodus 17:16, were written as one word, (e.g. כי יד על כסיה). However, in the Yemenite tradition, the words are not joined together, but are written as two words, just as the words appear in the Leningrad Codex and in the Damascus Pentateuch. This anomaly may be attributed to the fact that the Yemenite copyists in their transmission of the masorah made use of several ancient works, and perhaps even their own ancient Torah scrolls, just as they did when conveying the plene and defective scripta of the textus receptus (which almost completely agreed with that of masorete, Ben-Asher) – yet, without the aid or assistance of Maimonides who left no indication on how these words should be written, or just as they did also with the irregular letters written in the Torah, although here, too, Maimonides gave no indication about which of these letters should be made differently. While Ben Asher was the arbiter in cases of vocalization in the Aleppo Codex, he was not, admittedly, the scribe who wrote the text, which scribe was rather Shlomo ben Buya'a. Since the Leningrad Codex, a codex also proofread by Ben-Asher, stands at variance here with the Aleppo Codex's entry, one might only speculate if Ben-Asher ever totally agreed with everything written in those codices. Yishai ben Amram ha-Cohen Amadi (late 16th century), a man who had actually seen the Aleppo Codex and noted its rendition of כסיה as one word, continued to write in his own papers the word as being made-up of two words. Moreover, the Treatise Sofrim which brings down a list of words in the Torah that are written as one word, but read as two words (e.g. בגד in Gen. 30:11 which is read as בא גד, and אשדת in Deut. 33:3 which is read as אש דת) does not list כסיה as one of these words.

Mordechai Breuer makes note of the fact that "versions in the Talmud differ in many instances from the versions of the Masoretes (see, for example, Gilyon ha-Shas, the comments of R. Aqiba Eiger on the margin of the Talmud, Shabbat 55b). Accordingly, Talmudic versions are of no relevance here; perhaps they reflect the 'correct' or 'original' text of the Bible, but they are non-Masoretic by definition, and they have nothing to do with the uniform version which was accepted by the Tiberian Masoretes."

Similarly, according to Rashi, the verse ויהי ביום כלות משה (in Numbers 7:1) is written with כלת in defective scriptum. This, however, is not the case in the Masoretic Texts, nor in the Yemenite Jewish tradition, where the word כלות is written in plene scriptum. Elsewhere, according to Rashi, the word פילגשים in (Genesis 25:6) is also written in defective scriptum, and which is not the case in either the Masoretic texts or in the Yemenite Jewish tradition.

== Other line arrangements ==
A famous rabbinic dictum states that scribes are to be careful to have certain columns begin with fixed words, known by their mnemonics, בי"ה שמ"ו (an allusion to Psalm 68:5). These, too, can be found in their designated places, each letter commencing the word of that column. Such was also the practice in Yemen. For example: The Hebrew character bet (ב) represents the first word in the Torah, בראשית (Gen. 1:1); the Hebrew character yod (י) represents יהודה אתה יודוך (Gen. 49:8); the Hebrew character he (ה) represents הבאים אחריהם בים (Exo. 14:28); the Hebrew character shin (ש) represents שמר ושמעת (Deut. 12:28); the Hebrew character mim (מ) represents מוצא שפתיך תשמר (Deut. 23:24); and, finally, the Hebrew character waw (ו) represents ואעידה בם (Deut. 31:28). Different traditions abound for other communities who traditionally make use of a 42-line column. In the Yemenite tradition, the six-letters of the mnemonic device account for only two verses in the entire Torah where the column begins in the middle of a verse (Exo. 14:28 and Deut. 31:28), whereas in all other columns, the start of a new verse always commences a new column. Likewise, in Parashat Shemini (Leviticus 10:16), a tradition passed down by the scribes was to ensure that each scribe when copying from a master text is careful to write the first דרש (derosh) at the very end of the line, while the second דרש (derash) be written at the forefront of the next line. In the Yemenite Torah scroll brought out from Yemen, now belonging to Azriel ben Saadia Tzadok (Saleh) of Benei Barak, from which a Tikkun Soferim was made in five small pocket volumes to facilitate the accurate transmission of the same masorah by scribes, the first word דרש is, indeed, found at the very end of line no. 14, whereas the second word דרש is found written at the forefront of line no. 15.

There are yet other places in the Torah scroll where Masoretic scribes used key words to determine the layout of each column, and where these same words were traditionally written in specific places in their respective columns, such as in Numbers 31:5 (Hebrew: וימסרו מאלפי ישראל), and where the lamed of ישראל is written at the end of one line, above the ʾalef of צבא at the end of the following line, said to suggest that, from that time forward, Israel was placed above all other nations. Likewise, the verse in Deuteronomy 28:36 (Hebrew: יולך ה' אתך ואת מלכך) is traditionally placed at the start of a new column in Yemenite Torah scrolls, a practice alluded to in 2 Kings 22:13, said to be the place where Josiah opened-up to in the newly discovered Temple scroll.

=== Places in the Yemenite scrolls which differ from the Aleppo Codex ===
Maimonides, summarizing the different orthographic traditions, wrote: "Authorities on the Masora... differ according to the variations in the scrolls on which they rely." The oldest manuscripts containing the Masora of the early masoretes, such as the London Codex (British Library Or. 4445) and the Leningrad Codex, the Damascus Crown and the Aleppo Codex (based on various testimonies), were all written with a Closed section in pericope Ki Tisa (Exo. 34:1), in the verse פסל לך, while in pericope Ṣav (Lev. 7:28–29) there was written an Open section in the verse המקריב. Neither one of these sections reflect the custom of Yemen today, which points to the assumption that, apparently, they changed their ancient practice in this matter to conform with that of Maimonides, as stated by the late chief Yemenite Rabbi, Yosef Qafih. Scholars have pointed out eight differences between the Aleppo Codex and the Yemenite tradition of orthography. At least in one reference it is believed to be an error by the copyist of the Aleppo Codex, and is not generally practised by any community in Israel, namely, that of writing היא in Leviticus 25:10–12 (יובל היא) with a yod (י) instead of a waw (ו). It is not immediately clear if the Yemenites retained portions of their old tradition when incorporating in their writings the masorah of Ben-Asher.

Comparative study of codices
Source	Sephardic tradition	Yemenite tradition	London Codex	Leningrad Codex	Damascus Codex	Aleppo Codex
Gen. 4:13	גדול עוני מנשוא	גדול עוני מנשא	xxx	גדול עוני מנשא	xxx	גדול עוני מנשא
Gen. 7:11	נבקעו כל מעינות	נבקעו כל מעינת	xxx	נבקעו כל מעינת	xxx	נבקעו כל מעינת
Gen. 9:29	ויהי כל ימי נח	ויהיו כל ימי נח	xxx	ויהיו כל ימי נח	ויהיו כל ימי נח	ויהיו כל ימי נח
Gen. 41:45	פוטי פרע	פוטיפרע	פוטי פרע	פוטיפרע	פוטיפרע	פוטי פרע
Exo. 1:19	בטרם תבוא אלהן	בטרם תבוא אלהן	בטרם תבוא אלהן	בטרם תבוא אלהן	בטרם תבוא אלהן	בטרם תבוא אליהן
Exo. 17:16	כי יד על כס יה	כי יד על כס יה	כי יד על כסיה	כי יד על כס יה	כי יד על כס יה	כי יד על כסיה
Exo. 20:14	פר' סתומה לא תחמד אשת רעך	פר' סתומה לא תחמד אשת רעך	פר' סתומה לא תחמד אשת רעך	פר' סתומה לא תחמד אשת רעך	xxx	פר' סתומה לא תחמד אשת רעך
Exo. 25:31	תיעשה המנורה	תעשה המנורה	תעשה המנורה	תעשה המנורה	תעשה המנורה	תעשה המנורה
Exo. 28:26	אל עבר האפוד	אל עבר האפד	אל עבר האפד	אל עבר האפד	אל עבר האפד	אל עבר האפד
Exo. 34:1	פר' פתוחה פסל לך	(פר' פתוחה (פסל לך	(פר' סתומה (פסל לך	(פר' סתומה (פסל לך	(פר' סתומה (פסל לך	(פר' סתומה (פסל לך
Lev. 7:22–23	אין פרשה	(פר' פתוחה (כל חלב	(פר' פתוחה (כל חלב	(פר' פתוחה (כל חלב	(פר' פתוחה (כל חלב	(פר' פתוחה (כל חלב
Lev. 7:28–29	פר' פתוחה המקריב	אין פרשה	(פר' פתוחה (המקריב	(פר' פתוחה (המקריב	(פר' פתוחה (המקריב	(פר' פתוחה (המקריב
Lev. 19:16	לא תעמד על דם רעך	לא תעמד על דם רעך	לא תעמד על דם רעך	לא תעמד על דם רעך	לא תעמד על דם רעך	לא תעמד על דם רעיך
Lev. 25:10–12	יובל הוא	יובל הוא	יובל הוא	יובל הוא	יובל הוא	יובל היא
Num. 1:17	אשר נקבו בשמות	אשר נקבו בשמת	אשר נקבו בשמת	אשר נקבו בשמות	אשר נקבו בשמות	אשר נקבו בשמת
Num. 10:10	ובראשי חדשכם	ובראשי חדשיכם	xxx	ובראשי חדשיכם	ובראשי חדשכם	ובראשי חדשיכם
Num. 22:5	בלעם בן בעור	בלעם בן בער	בלעם בן בעור	בלעם בן בעור	בלעם בן בעור	בלעם בן בעור
Num. 25:12	בריתי של:ם	בריתי שלום	בריתי שלום	בריתי שלום	בריתי שלום	בריתי שלום
Deut. 23:2	פצוע דכה	פצוע דכא	xxx	פצוע דכא	פצוע דכא	פצוע דכא

In the days of Abraham ben Moses ben Maimon (1186–1237), the Jews of Yemen addressed thirteen questions unto him, one of which concerning the interstices --- the Open and Closed sections of the Torah as prescribed by his father, Maimonides, and what to do with a tradition that differs, to which he replied: "We see that there are many differences between the scribes in the matter of the Open and Closed sections, while the books that are in Israel greatly differ in this matter, and we have already seen the exponents of our laws, of blessed memory, who have taken positions in each of these works, which thing has its rightful place, since we do not possess the Book of the Temple court, which [if we had] we could meticulously learn from it about the matter, nor is there regarding this matter a tradition whereupon everyone agrees, to the extent that we could actually disqualify whatsoever contradicts it. Nevertheless, the right thing is to scrupulously attend to the matter, just as it appears in the Composition (i.e. Mishne Torah), in the Book of Ahavah, but whatsoever is found to be different from it, no one is to give judgment concerning it that it is invalid, unless it is different from all the books that are in existence." The essence of the question implies that the Yemenites formerly had a different practice than that mentioned by Maimonides. The modern Yemenite Jewish custom with respect to the Open and Closed sections of the Torah follows that of Maimonides, in spite of the Shulhan Arukh's ruling (275:2) that scribes ought to strive to fulfill the opinions of, both, Maimonides and Rabbeinu Asher, where they are in agreement, and to avoid making the sections where the sections are only in accordance with one opinion. The Sephardic custom at the time of the author of the Shulhan Arukh was strictly in accordance with Maimonides' prescription, although it, too, has now changed to comply with the Shulhan Arukh.

Yitzhak Ratzaby notes in his Tajā de-Oraitha (p. 14) that, in the old codices made in Yemen before the advent of Maimonides, scribes in Yemen adhered to a different orthographic practice with respect to certain plene and defective scripta and the Open and Closed sections. He notes that, in the Old Yemenite tradition, the yod in ישפט ה' (Gen. 16:5) was made small, citing Ben Isaiah 1983, p. 88, who wrote that it was "the smallest of all yods," unlike today's tradition. The Old Yemenite tradition was also to write ואת בנו (Num. 16:35) in defective scriptum; the word בניו written without a yod, as described by Ben Isaiah 1983, p. 439, but unlike today's tradition. Elsewhere, the Old Yemenite tradition was to make the mim in מה טובו (Num. 24:5) large, unlike today's tradition. Other orthographic traditions were known to exist prior to the general reception of the Masoretic text.

== Treating of leather and ink used in Torah scroll ==
In Yemen, large goats (2 yrs. old) were used in making the parchment for Torah scrolls, as opposed to tefillin (phylacteries) in which only small kids of the goats (appx. 2 months old) were used for the vellum. The advantage of goat skin over sheep skin is that goat skin is tougher and finer in grain. In Torah scrolls, the principal tannin substance was derived from the leaves of the salam-tree (Acacia etbaica; A. nilotica kraussiana), a tree known locally by the name qaraḍ (garadh). The same tannin substance and its use in treating leather for sacred scrolls is mentioned by Maimonides (1989:298). These leaves, being astringent, have the same function as gall. A bath solution of the crushed leaves of this tree, into which raw leather had been inserted for prolonged soaking, would take only 15 days for curing. The water and leaves, however, required changing after seven or eight days, and the leather needed to be turned over daily. Usually such treatment would suffice, without the need of spreading any other salve onto the leather, but only in cases where there was an erasure and the newly applied ink would spread would scribes in Yemen practise "sizing" of the leather, a process so-called by treating the leather parchment with a paste of Tragacanth gum (Arabic: كثيراء) or Gum arabic, and allowing the place to dry before applying ink. In some places, the fleshy-side of the leather (being the side that is written upon) was treated with a fine application of castor oil, taken directly from the bean of the castor oil plant (Ricinus communis), and which application is known to give added elasticity and durability to the leather.

According to Amram Qorah, the way in which leather was prepared in Yemen for use in writing a Torah scroll was as follows:

If it were full-grain leather (Heb. ğawīl) that the scribe wanted to write a Torah scroll upon, he would go to the tanner, select for himself sheep hides that had been treated (cured) to his satisfaction, and the tanner would sell them to him in their imperfect state, without trimming and without modification. The scribe then brings them to his house, softens them by sprinkling water upon them, and then spreads them out and stretches them, and then smooths the face of the leather on its flesh side, by scraping it with an instrument called a rasp (Arabic: mibshara). Afterwards, he cuts away the excessive edges and the outer corners, until he is left with a square sheet of leather. He then stains the sheet [of leather] with a dye solution made of turmeric, which resembles the colour of saffron, and then marks on the two ends of the sheet of parchment with the aid of a tool called a ruler the number of lines that are customarily made, and thus he delineates lines after he had rubbed the face of the leather on the side facing the hairs, with a smooth stone, in a scrupulous manner, so that it will be fitting and make writing easier. He then divides the columns and, forthwith, begins his task [of writing].
[As for the parchment known as q'laf] (the leather that is not whole, and used mainly for writing the portions contained in the Tefillin), most scribes were skilled in treating leather for use as q'laf. The scribe does all those steps mentioned in the working of ğawīl, and smooths the face of the leather on its flesh side, for the space of what is needed to write upon [and no more], leaving it white, without dyeing it any colour."

When it came to ğawīl (the full-grain leather), scribes would write on the side on which the hair had grown, since its side was smoother than the other side.

In Yemen, scribes prepared their own ink concoction, usually made from soaking copper sulphate crystals (copper vitriol) in water, known locally as zāğ (Arabic: زاج), but more often by mixing in the water al-ḥura (Litharge of alum), qishr rumān (Pomegranate rinds), ʿafaṣ (Gall), ground to a powder and steeped in water and exposed to the sun's rays for two or three days, sifted of its residue and its yellowish liquid added to the ink concoction only near the time of writing, and after the ink had once again been allowed to sit in the sun for more than a day in order to receive its luster. An excessive amount of gall was seen as detrimental to the ink, therefore, used sparingly, as also too many pomegranate rinds will cause the ink to fade. A little sugar was also added to the ink concoction, as well as soot from the flame of burnt oils held against glass and ṣameġ (Gum Arabic). In some places, wormwood (Artemisia absinthium), or what is called in Arabic shiba, was added to the ink to preserve the leather from mold and mildew. The traditional writing instrument in Yemen was the cane reed (calamus), rather than the feathered quill.

== Forms of the letters and special techniques ==
Just as there is a unique style of writing associated with Ashkenazi scrolls, and another style for Sephardic scrolls, so too is there a style of writing that is peculiar to Yemenite scribes of the previous centuries. Each community, however, makes use of the square Hebrew script. In the older Torah scrolls of Yemenite provenance, there was not a practice among scribes to write the Hebrew letters with their Tagim, since the accurate tradition of doing so had long been lost. The ancient practice in Yemen when writing the letter ḥet (ח) is to make its roof flat, and not a "gable-roof," as prescribed by Rabbeinu Tam (Yaakov Meir), although more modern scrolls have adopted Rabbeinu Tam's method. The difference stems from one's understanding of the word חטרי in Tractate Menaḥoth. In Yemenite scrolls, the Hebrew letters are made to suspend a fraction below the ruled lines, rather than hang directly from the ruled lines.

The manner in which Jewish scribes made certain Hebrew characters has evolved throughout the years in Yemen. Rabbi David ben Zimra (1479–1573) mentions the practice of the Jews of Aden, where in all their Torah scrolls the left leg of the Hebrew character he (ה) was slightly joined to the roof of the letter, a practice which he disqualifies, although admitting that such was also the practice that he found in old scrolls written in Egypt, and which practice had been rendered valid by Rabbi Isaac ben Sheshet and Rabbi Joseph Colon. Nevertheless, the old practice in Yemen of slightly joining the leg of the Hebrew character he (ה) to its roof, or the leg of the qof (ק) to its roof, eventually evolved to conform with the custom that is practised in other communities in Israel. Rabbi Yosef Qafih, commenting on Maimonides' Mishne Torah, responds to the old practice and goes to great lengths to show that such letters, had they been written in such a way, should not be disqualified, although the custom in Israel has now changed.

One of the unique features found in scrolls penned in Yemen is the practice of marking the end of the biblical verse, not with ink, but by stamping the leather with a round-tipped metal instrument at the end of the verse, in order to assist the baal qoré when reading and knowing when he is to come to a full-stop. These dot-like impressions in the leather were made so as to resemble an inverted segol (one dot on top of two dots). Where the reading was to produce the sound made by the trope symbol etnaḥa (brief pause), it too was marked with only one dot by the same instrument beneath the word whose reading is to be read as such. Two diagonal stamp marks were made above the word whose reading called for it to be read with a zarqa. Some have questioned the validity of marking a Torah scroll in this way, but the sages of Yemen have explained its validity by saying that extraneous markings that are made in the leather without ink are permitted.

Yemenite Torah scrolls traditionally had also this additional feature where the top corners of each leather sheet of parchment were folded backwards, immediately following the leather's treatment and before the actual writing. This was done to distinguish between each sheet, as also to give the reader the ability to grasp with his two hands the sheet of parchment by the folds, without touching the letters themselves. The left and right margins of each sheet of parchment were made to a standard width of one-fingerbreadth (ca. 2.5 cm.), and when coupled together with other sheets, the margins came to two fingerbreadths. The stitching of the sheets of parchment together was made differently from the practices found among other groups, in that the stitching made with ligaments was made closer together (appx. one centimeter between stitches) and more tightly fitting in Yemenite scrolls. As required in Jewish law, and as found among all other groups, they did not sew the sheets together at the upper and lower ends of the margins, but left a space there unstitched.

=== Torah cases ===
The Torah case (Heb. tiq) traditionally used in Yemen was either a seven faceted or octagonal wooden box, typically made of a light wood, such as Sudanese teak (Cordia abyssinica), equipped with a pair of brass clasps cut in ornamental floral shapes for closing. The entire wooden box was fitted tightly with a thickly woven decorative cloth, replete with 3 to 5 buttons with matching loops. The top of the box was made with slits wherein they inserted protruding staves for carrying the decorative silver finials (Heb. rimmonim).

=== Reading customs ===
The universal Yemenite Jewish custom is to have each biblical verse that is read on Sabbath days and holidays to be accompanied audibly by its Aramaic translation, taken from Targum Onkelos, in accordance with Mishnah Megillah 4:4 and Babylonian Talmud (Megillah 3a). This practice has ceased with other Jewish communities, owing to a teaching in the Shulchan Aruch (Orach Chayim 145:3) which no longer requires the observance of this practice. The same is done for the readings of the prophets, known as Haftara, in which case the Aramaic Targum of Jonathan ben Uzziel is used. The reading from the Targum is usually performed by a child who stands next to the dais whereon is laid the Torah scroll.

The Yemenite Jewish practice follows closely that described in Rabbi Achai of Shabha's She'iltot (Parashat Nitzavim, section no. 161) who wrote:

And when he reads [from the Torah], a translator must respond [to each verse], and they are to adjust the tone of their voices together [so that they are the same]. But if the translator cannot raise his voice, let the reader [from the Torah] lower his own voice.

Among the number of seven persons who are called to read from the Torah, the Yemenite tradition will have one child of nine or ten years to read from the Torah scroll on the Sabbath days, on a regular basis (usually the sixth designated portion from the reading of the biblical lection), which practice follows a teaching in the Talmud (Megillah 23a) that says: "The Rabbis have taught, 'All may go up to the seven numerated [divisions], and even a small child, or even a woman'..." (End Quote). Even so, with respect to children reading the sixth division, this is relatively a new innovation or custom among the Yemenites. The Sages have said that, with respect to women, a woman should not read in the Torah [scroll] "due to the public's honour." The seventh designated portion was usually reserved for one of the chief persons of the synagogue.

== Testimonials ==
Yaakov Sapir (1822–1886), a Lithuanian Jewish scholar from Jerusalem, was commissioned by the Jerusalem Rabbinate and traveled to Egypt, to Yemen and to India between the years 1857 to 1863. In 1859, he visited the Jewish community in Yemen, publishing an account of his travels soon thereafter in a book entitled, Iben Sapir, perhaps one of the most momentous travelogues ever to have been written in that century, and where he describes the life of the Jewish community there. He also described the Torah scrolls and codices had in Yemen and their peculiar tradition of orthography, an excerpt of which follows.

Yaakov Sapir on the Tradition of Orthography in Yemen

And lo, in their books of the Torah there are to be found several differences in defective and plene letters, for example: minnaso (Gen. 4:13), [in the verse, "My iniquity is greater than I can bear,"] lacks a waw; [or] maʻayanoth (Gen. 7:11) [in the verse, "All of the fountains of the deep were opened,"] lacks a waw; [as well as] wiyiheyu kol yamei noaḥ (Gen. 9:28), [in the verse, "And all of the days of Noah were," etc., is written] with the addition of a waw at its end; teʻaseh (Exo. 25:31), [in the verse, "Of beaten work shall the candlestick be made,"] lacks a yod; ḥodsheikhem (Num.10:10), [in the verse, "Your new moons," etc., is written] with the addition of a yod; as also in the lay-out of the Song of the Sea (Exo.15: 1-ff.) and in certain closed sections [of the Law]. And I saw that all their ancient books were [written] in this way.

(A note appended later by R. Yaakov Sapir to the above section reads as follows:)

I do recall my faults this day. When I had taken with me a scroll of the Torah [written] in the handwriting of the scriveners of Yemen, and when I had proofread it, I found in it the differences that I formerly mentioned, as well as other [changes] – besides that which can be attributed to scribal error, and I corrected it after the manner of our own books. Then when I happened to be, afterwards, in Paris during [the month of] Tishri, 5625 anno mundi (1865 CE), I saw a book in the library of that great personage, the savant and honorable teacher and Rabbi, Rabbi Hertz Ginsburg (may his light shine), which [library] stood under the supervision of my beloved friend, the wise and illustrious Rabbi, [even] our teacher the Rabbi, S. Zacks (may his light shine), a most dear manuscript made by the Rabbi [who is known as] the Meiri, of blessed memory, [and which book was entitled], Kiryat Sefer. (Note: Rabbi Menaḥem Ha-Meiri wrote his Kiryat Sefer shortly after the year 1306 CE, which work quickly gave him high acclaim. It is quoted by R. Yoseph Karo.)

Its name is derived from [its content, which treats on] all the laws governing the scroll of the Law, how it ought to be written, and how read, therein showing all of the defective [letters], and plene [letters], (Note: The sense here is to superfluous letters.) open sections and closed sections, [etc., which scribes are wont to make in a scroll of the Law] – nothing being left undone, whether small or great, which he did not bring out in that book. He has withal done far more than what could ever have been expected, whether it were of any man who came before him, or who should come after him. Now I shall copy here, in short, an outline of the matters from one of the chapters, being useful for the purport [of our discourse], and whose words are as follows:

"Now behold, herein, do I make a copy (Note: Literally, "write.") of the writing which the forenamed Rabbi (i.e. the Ramah, (Note: Rabbi Meir Halevi, the son of R. Todros. He came from Burgos, in Spain, but moved to Toledo (Ṭulayṭulah) where he taught the Torah among many, and raised up many disciples. He wrote several commentaries on the different tractates of the Talmud. He died in 1244 CE.) of blessed memory) sent to the sages of Burgos [in Spain] who had belabored themselves on this point (i.e. over the subject of proofreading the scroll of the Law) with a well-known book [of the Law] attributed to Hillel the elder, [and] which was called by them Halleujah." (Note: In the book, Sefer Yuchasin, the title of this book of the Law, or else Codex, is given as Hilleli, rather than Hallelujah, but in Rabbi Meir’s account in his Kiryat Sefer the Codex was called Halleliyya. The ancient Codex is allegedly referenced in the colophon of Jewish Theological Seminary MS. JTS 44a, where it claims that the said Spanish Codex was proofread by using Sefer Halleli as its master text.)

The [author of the book] Yuchasin (Note: Rabbi Abraham Zacuto.) wrote these words: "Now in the year 4956 anno mundi (1196 CE), on the 8th of Menaḥem Av, there fell out a great religious persecution in the kingdom of León, (Note: A place in NW Spain.) to the extent that they carried away from there a Codex containing the 24 canonical books of the Bible, called the Biblia, which R. Hillel (Note: In the book, Sefer Yuchasin, his name is given as Rabbi Moshe ben Hillel.) had written, and from which they would proofread the texts of all the scrolls. Now I saw some of them (i.e. scrolls) that were sold in Africa, and at my time, they were nine-hundred years old since the time they were first written." (Note: Meaning, during the time of Abraham Zakuto, the Codex was aged nine-hundred years, since it was compiled in circa 596 CE.) The [same author of the book] Yuchasin, on the year 5250 anno mundi (1490 CE), wrote: ha-Qimḥi (Note: Rabbi Qimḥi.) (c. 1160–c. 1235) said in his Piece on Grammar, in the chapter lemaʻan tizkaru, that the Codex was in Toledo [of Spain], and [that it was found written after its prescription] in the books [of the Law] left by the early Geonim, [particularly] by Rav Sherira [Gaon] and Rabbeinu Hai [Gaon]. And when the books of Rabbeinu Moshe (i.e. Maimonides, of blessed memory) came amongst them and they saw his tradition of orthography (Note: Literally, "his orders.") in this regard, they sent to him (i.e. to the Ramah) and he answered them after [much] flowery speech and many praises, whose words were these: 'But presently I shall tell you the truth, that all the books that have reached us of those books written by Rabbeinu Moshe (Maimonides), may peace rest on him, with regard to open sections and closed sections, all of them were engrossed with different errors one from the other, since the words of the book were concealed [from understanding], and those copyists who copied from it made rash decisions on their own, and each one added [what he pleased], and diminished [from the true text] according to his own understanding, thus defacing the books with things that they imagined in their heart to be true, and which they gave their opinion to, but which I was compelled to investigate and make inquiry into, etc., etc. And so, I sent to Marseilles, to the most erudite man [there], Samuel Ibn Tibbon, (Note: He is the great philosopher and scholar who translated Maimonides' "Guide to the Perplexed" into the Hebrew language during Maimonides' lifetime.) the physician, and I asked him to send me an [accurate] account of the closed and open sections from the book [of the Law] that was copied from the book [of the Law] belonging to that Rabbi (i.e. Maimonides) that came with him to Marseilles, and which said Rabbi (may his memory be blessed) had signed in his own handwriting; as also that which I, myself, had written down from the book (that was no longer before me), I am Moshe, the son of Rabbi Maimon the Sepharadi. And so did he do, sending them to me with due speed, and I found in the copy of the writing, etc. all the things that you brought to my attention for a decision [as touching the writings of Maimonides] that they were [indeed] true, etc. and that the other matters that were concealed [therein from our understanding] were not made clear unto me by that book until I was compelled to once again search and inquire [into them], etc., and it was revealed unto me their import (Note: Literally, "those things that remained of them.") by the help of Him who favors man with understanding. Now, behold! They are written in this [leafed] booklet which is being sent to you, etc., [both] open and closed [sections], [and] that which is neither an open [section] nor a closed [section], but rather an arranged [section], (Note: The arranged section (Heb. parashah sedurah) is to be found also in the Yemenite tradition of orthography, said to be those indentations that do not comprise in length the space made by nine letters, but somewhat shorter, such as when a scribe concludes the writing of a section near the left margin, without extending the words unto the margin.) in my own handwriting. Likewise, I have written for you the lay-out of the [prosaic] song Ha'azinu (Note: This is in complete harmony and agreement with the Yemenite tradition of orthography.) in two categories: one, containing the names of words that come at the beginning of each line; the other, containing the names of words that come at the end of each line. (Now there are altogether sixty-seven lines [in the prosaic song Ha'azinu], just as it is found in my handwritten Bible Codex, and in [copies of] Maimonides of [those made by the] early exponents of our laws…) … [Signed]: From him that has been afflicted with reproof of instruction, not with whips, per se, but with scorpions, until he was compelled to confess his sorrow unto many – perchance they will seek mercy upon him from Him who has mercy; [I], who writes to his friends and companions, Meir Halevi, the son of R. Todros.' "

And, there, the Rabbi who is the Meiri, of blessed memory, writes more, [viz.], that in Toledo [of Spain] there was a book [of the Law] called the Book of Ezra, (Note: A scroll of the Torah believed to have been written by Ezra the scribe, and which, based on the testimony of Rabbi Obadiah of Bertinoro, was once kept in Old Cairo, in Egypt. The ancient scroll is said to have been taken out from there, and during a voyage at sea, the ship which transported it sank and the scroll was lost forever. Ratzaby, Yitzhaq (1975), p. 32, has pointed out that in the "Book of Ezra" mentioned above there was found written in it like the Yemenite tradition, namely: גדול עוני מנשא (without a waw in the word מנשא), and in the verse, נבקעו על מעינת (without a waw in the word מעינת).) and a certain Codex that was copied from the Codex belonging to the Ramah (i.e. Meir ha-Levi b. Todros Abulafia, c. 1165–1244), whom we mentioned, which [latter] was proofread many times with utmost diligence by several scribes and wise men, in the forenamed city, with painstaking care and great expense, and came afterwards into his hand (Note: i.e. into the hand of Rabbi Menahem Hameiri, author of Kiryat Sefer.) with all the testimonies of the proofreaders and scribes, and, based on it, he wrote in this, his own book Kiryat Sefer, every word which is either defective or plene, open and closed sections, in the year of the exile of France, which corresponds to the year 5066 anno mundi (1306 CE). Unto here we have brought down his words. Now, behold! I have found [and] seen in this [book], Kiryat Sefer, exactly as it is found written in the scrolls of Yemen! (q.v. supra, the treatise on Egypt, where I have elaborated in great length about all their details.) And so, in vain have I erased and made corrections. Now if I had seen it beforehand, I would not have touched it [with my own] hand! But He is merciful [and] atones for iniquity… END

Original:

והנה בס"ת שלהם נמצא כמה שנויים בחסר ויתר כמו מנשא (בראשית ד' י"ג) ח"ו מעינת (נח ז' י"א) ח"ו ויהיו כל ימי נח (נח ט' כ"ח) בואו לאחרונה תעשה (תרומה כ"ה ל"א) ח"י חדשיכם (בהעלותך י' י') מ"י וכן בצורת שירת הים ובאיזה סתומות * וראיתי שכל ספריהם הקודמים כן הוא

(המחבר הוסיף הערה זו בעת הדפוס)

את חטאי אני מזכיר היום כי הבאתי עמי ס"ת מכתיבת סופרי תימן וכאשר הגהתיה מצאתי בה השנויים הנז' ועוד (לבד איזה טעות סופר) ותיקנתיה עפ"י ספרים שלנו. ובהיותי אח"כ תשרי תרכ"ה בפאריז ראיתי בבית עקד הספרים של הגביר האדיר החכם הנכבד מו"ה הירץ גינצבורג נ"י העומדת תחת יד ידי"נ הרב החכם המפואר מוהר"ש זאקש נ"י ספר כ"י יקר להרב המאירי ז"ל קרית ספר. שמו על כל דיני ס"ת כתיבתו וקריאתו ומצויין בו כל החסרות ויתרות ופתוחות וסתומות לא הניח דבר קטון וגדול שלא העלה בספר הזה והוא מפליא לעשות מכל אשר לפניו ולאחריו. ואעתיק בזה בקיצור ריש מילין מפרק אחד הנצרך לענינינו וז"ל: "והריני כותב כאן כתב שלחו הרב הנזכר (הרמ"ה ז"ל) לחכמי בורגיש שטרחו על זה (בהגהת ס"ת) עם ספר הידוע להלל הזקן שנקרא ביניהם הללויה. [היוחסין כ' וז"ל: "ובשנה ד"א תתקנ"ו בח' למנחם הי' שמד גדול במלכות ליאון ואז הוציאו משם ספר הארבע ועשרים נקרא הביבליא שכתב אותם ר' הלל ומשם היו מגיהים כל הספרים ואני ראיתי חלק מהם שנמכרו באפריקא ובזמני הי' תשעה מאות שנה שנכתבו. (והיוחסין ה"א ר"נ) והקמחי אמר בחלק הדקדוק בפ' למען תזכרו שהחומש היה בטוליטולא.] ובספרים ישנים לגאונים הראשונים של רב שרירא ורבינו האיי וכשבאו ספרי רבינו משה (הרמב"ם ז"ל) אצלם וראו סדריו בענין זה שלחו לו (להרמ"ה) והשיב להם אחרי המליצית והשבחים כו' כו' וז"ל: "ועתה אמת אגיד לכם כי כל הספרים אשר הגיעו לידינו מספרי רבינו משה ע"ה בענין הפתוחות והסתומות כולם היו מוטעים טעיות משונות זה מזה מפני דברי הספר שהיו מסותמים והמעתיקים ממנו באו להכריע מדעתם והוסיף כל אחד וגרע כפי הכרע דעתו והשחיתו את הספרים בדברים אשר בדו מלבם ואשר הכריעו מדעתם ואני הוצרכתי לחקור ולדרוש כו' וכו' ושלחתי למארסילי' לחכם המובהק שמואל אבן תיבון הרופא ובקשתי ממנו לשלוח לי נוסח הפרשיות הסתומות והפתוחות מן הספר המועתק מספר הרב שבא עמו למארשילי' ושהרב זכרונו לברכה חתם עליו בחתימת ידו וגם זה מן הספר שכתבתי אני שלא בפני אני משה בר' מיימון הספרדי וכן עשה ושלחם אלי בזריזות ומצאתי בפתשגן הכתב כו' את כל הדברים אשר הכרעת דעתי כי אמת הי' כו' ושארי הדברים המסותמים לא נתבררו לי מן הספר ההוא עד אשר הוצרכתי לשוב ולחקור ולדרוש כו' ונתגלו לי שאריתם בעזרת החונן לאדם דעת והנם כתובים בקונטירס הזה השלוח אליכם כו' פתוחות וסתומות לא פתוחה ולא סתומה אלא סדורה כ"י וכן כתבתי לכם צורת שירת האזינו בשני סימנים אחד בשמות התיבות שבראש כל שטה ואחד בשמות התיבות שבראש כל שטה האחרון [א"ס והם בששים ושבע שיטין כמו בהתנ"ך כ"י שלי וברמב"ם כ"י הראשונים והארכתי בזה במ"א.] ... מאת המיוסר בתוכחת מוסר לא בשוטים כי אם בעקרבים עד שהוצרך להודיע צערו לרבים אולי יבקשו עליו רחמים מאת בעל הרחמים כותב לידידיו ורעיו מאיר הלוי בר' טודרוס

וכותב עוד שם הרב המאירי ז"ל שבטולטילא הי' ספר נקרא ספר עזרא וספר אחד שנעתק מספר הרמ"ה הנז' והוגה פעמים רבות בחריצות נפלא ע"י כמה סופרים וחכמים בעיר הנז' בטרחה והוצאה מרובה והגיע אח"כ לידו עם כל העדיות של המגיהים והסופרים ועל פיו כתב בספרו זה קרית ספר כל מלה חסרה ויתרה פתוחות וסתומות בשנת גלות צרפת היא שנת חמשת אלפים וששים ושש לבריאת העולם עכ"ל. והנה מצאתי ראיתי בזה הקרית ספר כפי הכתוב בספרי תימן (ראה למעלה במצרים שהארכתי בכל פרטיהם.) ובחנם מחקתי ותקנתי ואם ראיתיו קודם לא נגעתי בה יד והוא רחום יכפר עון

== See also ==
- Baladi-rite prayer
- List of Hebrew Bible manuscripts

== Bibliography ==
- Abraham Maimuni (1937). Avraham H. Freimann; Shelomo Dov Goitein (eds.). Abraham Maimuni Responsa (in Hebrew). Jerusalem: Mekize Nirdamim.
- Al-ʻAdeni, Saʻīd ben David (2009). Zephaniah Shar'abi (ed.). Commentary of Rabbeinu Saʻīd ben David al-ʻAdeni on Maimonides' Mishneh-Torah (Sefer Ahavah) (in Hebrew). Translated by Pinḥas Qorah. Kiryat Sefer: Mareh. OCLC 762537554., printed from manuscript copied in 1485 CE
- Al-Dhamari, Sa'adyah ben David (1999). Midrash ha-Beʼur (in Hebrew). Vol. 2. Translated by Yosef Qafih. Kiryat Ono: Mekhon Mishnat ha-Rambam. OCLC 40260458.
- Al-Naddaf, A. (1981). Saadia Al-Naddaf (ed.). Sefer ʻAnaf Ḥayim (in Hebrew). Vol. 2. Jerusalem: Saadia Al-Naddaf. OCLC 232889851.
- Amar, Z. (2017). Differing Halachic Customs between 'Baladi' Yemenite and Other Jewish Communities (in Hebrew). Neve-Tzuf (Halamish). ISBN 978-965-90891-2-3. OCLC 992702131.
- Ben Isaiah, N. (1983). Sefer Me'or ha-Afelah (in Hebrew). Translated by Yosef Qafih. Kiryat Ono: Mechon Moshe. OCLC 970925649.
- Benveniste, C. (n.d.). Questions & Responsa 'Ba'ei Chayei' (in Hebrew). Vol. 2.
- Bin-Nun, Adam (2016). The Yemenite Manuscripts of the Pentateuch and the Linguistic Tradition Reflected in Them in Comparison with the Orthography, Vocalization and Accentuation in the Ben-Asher Codex and with R. Yaḥya Ṣālaḥ's Ḥeleq Ha-Diqdūq, Thesis in fulfillment of the requirements for "Doctor of Philosophy (in Hebrew). Ramat-Gan: Bar-Ilan University (The Department of Hebrew and Semitic Languages). (Hebrew title:כתבי היד התימניים של התורה והמסורת המשתקפת מהם בהשוואה למסורת הכתיב הניקוד והטעמים שבכתר בן-אשר ול"חלק הדקדוק" של מהרי"ץ)
- Breuer, M. (1976). The Aleppo Codex and the Accepted Text of the Bible. Jerusalem: Mossad Harav Kook. OCLC 246075750.
- Gaimani, Aharon (2008). Havatzelet Hasharon by Rabbi Yihye Bashiri (in Hebrew). Jerusalem: Yad Harav Nissim Publishing House. ISBN 978-965-555-318-5. OCLC 609226613.
- Gelis, Jacob (1968). The Customs of the Land of Israel (מנהגי ארץ-ישראל). Jerusalem: Mossad Harav Kook. OCLC 873519965.
- Hibshoosh, Yehiel (1985). The Hibshoosh Family Pentateuch (Facsimile Edition of an Exquisite Yemenite Manuscript copied in the year 1485 by the illustrious scribe, David ben Benaya) (in Hebrew). Jerusalem/Tel-Aviv: Jewish National and University Library. OCLC 173752358.
- Ibn Abi-Zimra, David (1749). David Ashkenazi (ed.). The Responsa of the Radbaz (in Hebrew). Vol. 1. Venice. OCLC 233235313., s.v. Part II, responsum # 596 (reprinted in Israel, n.d.)
- Kasher, M. (1978), "The Script of the Torah and its Characters", Chomash 'Torah Sheleimah' (in Hebrew), vol. 29, Jerusalem: Beit Torah Sheleimah
- Levi Nahum, Yehudah (1981). Yosef Tobi (ed.). Mi-yetsirot sifrutiyot mi-Teman (Fragments of Literary Works from Yemen) (in Hebrew). Ḥolon (Israel). OCLC 17042786.
- Macho, A. Díez, ed. (1977). Facsimile edition of Ms. Vat. Heb. 448 (The Pentateuch with the Masorah Parva and the Masorah Magna and with Targum Onkelos) (in Hebrew). Vol. 1–5. Jerusalem: Makor Publishing Ltd. (original: Vatican Library). OCLC 862568143.
- Maimonides (n.d.), "Hil. Sefer Torah", Mishne Torah (in Hebrew)
- Maimonides (1989). Jehoshua Blau (ed.). R. Moses b. Maimon Responsa (in Hebrew). Vol. 2. Jerusalem: Meḳitse nirdamim / Rubin Mass Ltd. p. 298 (responsum # 153). OCLC 78411726.
- Meiri (1956). Moshe Hirschler (ed.). Kiryat Sefer (in Hebrew). Vol. 1. Jerusalem: HaMasorah. OCLC 233177823.
- Meiri (1881). Kiryat Sefer (in Hebrew). Vol. 2. Izmir. (reprinted in Jerusalem 1969 by Makor Ltd.)
- Muchawsky-Schnapper, Ester (1999). "Ceremonial Objects in Yemenite Synagogues". Judaeo-Yemenite Studies – Proceedings of the Second International Congress. Princeton.
- Nathanel ben Yisha'yah (1983). Yosef Qafih (ed.). Meor ha-Afelah (in Hebrew) (2nd ed.). Kiryat Ono.
- Offer, Joseph (1989). "M.D. Cassuto's Notes on the Aleppo Codex". Sefunot: Studies and Sources on the History of the Jewish Communities in the East (in Hebrew). 4. Ben-Zvi Institute: 277–344. JSTOR 23414876=.
- Penkower, Jordan S. (1992). New Evidence for the Pentateuch Text in the Aleppo Codex (in Hebrew). Ramat-Gan: Bar-Ilan University. ISBN 965-226-129-7. OCLC 41651578.
- Pesikta Rabbati (n.d.). Meir Ish Shalom of Vienna (ed.). Midrash Pesikta Rabbati (in Hebrew). Israel. OCLC 249274973., (reprinted from 1880 edition)
- Qafih, Y., ed. (1985), "Hil. Tefillin, u'Mezuzzah weSefer Torah", Mishne Torah (in Hebrew), vol. 2, Kiryat-Ono: Mekhon mishnat ha-Rambam, OCLC 232908658
- Qafih, Y. (1989). Yosef Tobi (ed.). Rabbi Yosef Qafih - Collected Papers (in Hebrew). Vol. 2. Jerusalem: E'ele BeTamar. OCLC 61623627.
- Qorah, A. (1987). Shimon Greidi (ed.). Sa'arat Teiman (in Hebrew) (2nd ed.). Jerusalem. OCLC 233096108.
- Qorah, Shelomoh (2012). Arikhat Shulḥan – Yilqut Ḥayyim (in Hebrew). Vol. 13. Benei Barak. OCLC 62528741.
- Ratzaby, Yitzhaq [in Hebrew] (1975), "Ḳunṭris Taga deOraitha", Sefer Toldot Yitzhaq (in Hebrew), Benei Barak
- Ratzaby, Yitzhaq [in Hebrew] (1989). Questions & Responsa ʻOlat Yitzḥak (in Hebrew). Vol. 1. Benei Barak: Mechon Peʻulath Ṣadīq.
- Ratzaby, Yitzhaq [in Hebrew] (1992). Questions & Responsa ʻOlat Yitzḥak (in Hebrew). Vol. 2. Benei Barak: Mechon Peʻulath Ṣadīq.
- Ratzaby, Yitzhaq [in Hebrew] (2000). Shulhan Arukh ha-Mekutzar (Yoreh De'ah) (in Hebrew). Vol. 5 (part ii). Benei Barak.
- Saleh, Y. (1979a). Questions & Responsa 'Pe'ulath Ṣadīq' (in Hebrew). Vol. 1–2 (2nd ed.). Jerusalem. OCLC 122773689.
- Saleh, Y. (1979b). Questions & Responsa 'Pe'ulath Ṣadīq' (in Hebrew). Vol. 3 (2nd ed.). Jerusalem. OCLC 122773689.
- Sapir, J. (1866). Iben Safir (chapter Ḥadrei Teman) (in Hebrew). Vol. 2. Lyck: L. Silbermann. OCLC 192076334.
- Sapir, Y. (1986). Rafi Zer (ed.). "Meorot Nathan by Rabbi Ya'aqov Sapir (Ms JTS L 729)". Lĕšonénu: A Journal for the Study of the Hebrew Language and Cognate Subjects (in Hebrew). 50: 151–213. JSTOR 24359260.
- Sclar, David (2019), "A Letter's Importance: The Spelling of Daka(h) (Deut. 23:2) and the Broadening of Western Sephardic Rabbinic Culture", in Yosef Kaplan (ed.), Religious Changes and Cultural Transformations in the Early Modern Western Sephardic Communities, vol. 54, Leiden: Brill, pp. 393–413, ISBN 9789004367531, JSTOR 10.1163/j.ctvrzgvqk.21, OCLC 1057731121
- Subeiri, Yosef [in Hebrew] (1964), "Massoret Meduyeket", in Hasid, Yosef (ed.), Sefer Torah Tāj: Hamargalit, Jerusalem: Yosef Hasid, OCLC 233101579
- Tīkkūn Soferīm (1993). Azriel ben Saadia Tzadok (ed.). The Pentateuch: Five Books of the Torah (Tīkkūn Soferīm) (in Hebrew). Vol. 1–5. Benei Barak. (in five pocket volumes)
- Wertheimer, Abraham Joseph, ed. (1988). Yalḳuṭ Midreshe Teman ʻal ḥamimishah ḥumshe Torah - A Collection of Yemenite Midrashim on the Pentateuch (in Hebrew). Vol. 2. Jerusalem: Ktav-Yad Vesefer. OCLC 924293889.
- Yitzhak, Avichai (2009). The Book of Yemenite Jewish Tradition with respect to Fowl (Sefer mesorat yehudei teman be-'of) (in Hebrew). Zichron Ya'akov: Avichai Yitzhak. OCLC 951801067.
- Zechariah ha-Rofé (1990). Havazelet, Meir (ed.). Midrash ha-Ḥefetz (in Hebrew). Vol. 1. Jerusalem: Mossad Harav Kook. OCLC 23773577.
- Zechariah ha-Rofé (1992). Havazelet, Meir (ed.). Midrash ha-Ḥefetz (in Hebrew). Vol. 2. Jerusalem: Mossad Harav Kook. OCLC 23773577.
