= Shukr Kuhayl =

Shukr Kuhayl is the name of two 19th-century Yemenite messianic pretenders:

- Shukr Kuhayl I
- Shukr Kuhayl II, also known as Judah ben Shalom
