= Al-Ousta Codex =

14th-century Hebrew Bible codex

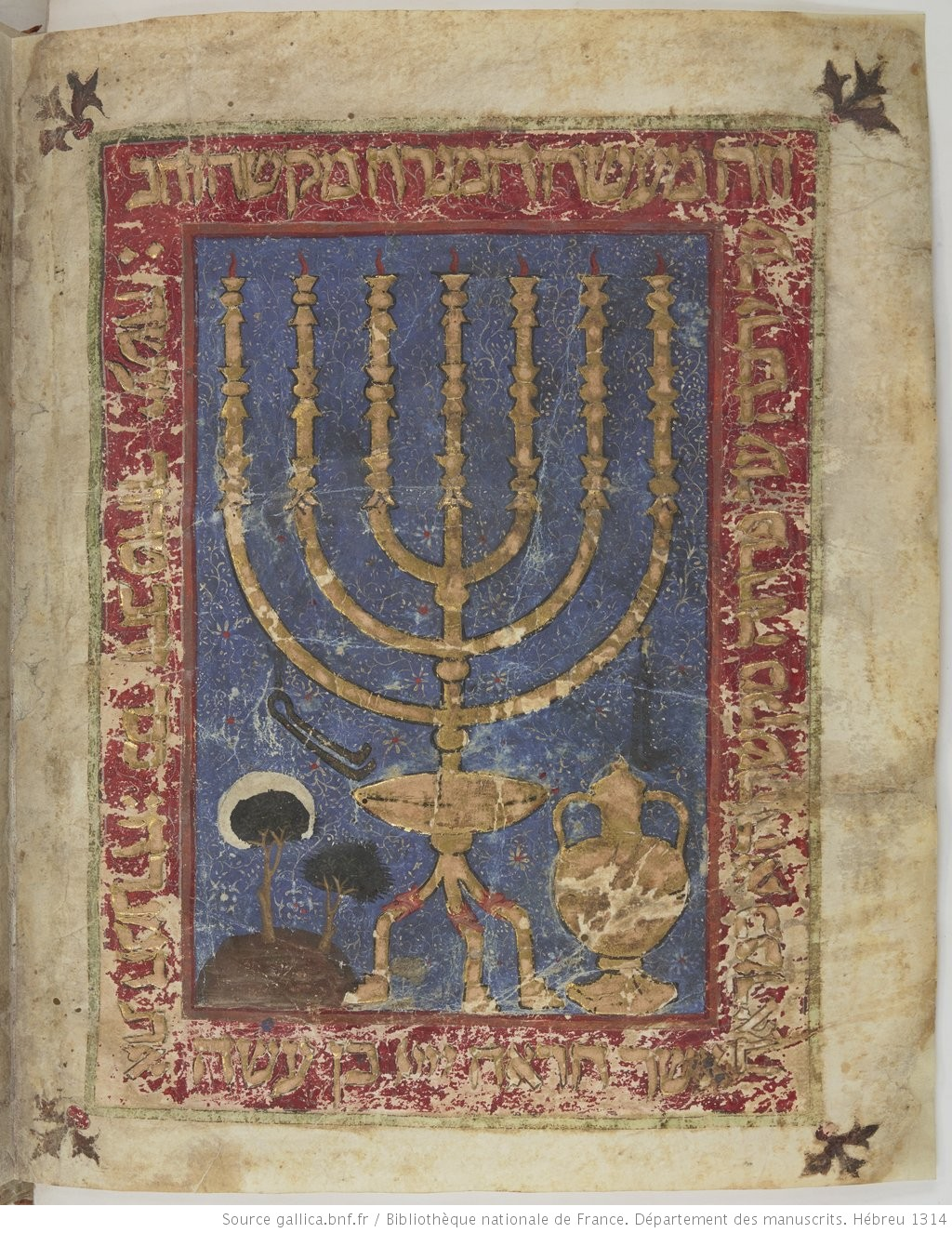
Illuminated Frontispiece, Al-Ousta Codex

Al-Ousta Codex, also known under its library classification BnF 1314-1315, is a 14th-century illuminated Bible codex (2 volumes) containing the 24 canonical books of the Hebrew Bible, written in Sephardi square script with the Tiberian sublinear vocalisation, minuscule trope symbols, and the Masorah Magna and Parva. Others place the writing of the codex in the 15th century. The manuscript was purchased by ethnographer Jacob Sapir in San'a, Yemen in 1859, who carried it with him to France. Today, the manuscript is housed at the Bibliotheque Nationale de Paris.

Although purchased in Yemen, the manuscript is not of Yemenite Jewish provenance, as it shows no signs of the ancient Yemenite Jewish tradition of orthography, but of the Sephardic Jewish tradition of orthography. Prior to its debut in Yemen, the manuscript was in Egypt, where it was purchased by Aharon haCohen Iraqi (al-'Usṭā), the visiting minister from Yemen and minter of the king's coins. Based on its colophon, one whose name was Sar-Shalom the nasi, the presumed head of the Sephardic Jewish community in Egypt and who lived in Cairo, had commissioned the manuscript's writing, and who had apparently been ordained and confirmed in his office by his brother, Shelomo Nasi, the exilarch (resh galutha).

== Jacob Sapir's description ==
The Al-Ousta codex, named for its original Yemenite Jewish owner whose descendants were coined the name "al-Ousta" (lit. al-'Usṭā = "the artisan"), was described by Jacob Sapir in 1872, who brought its attention to the western world. The MS. was purchased by Sapir from the grandchildren of a certain David ben Saʻīd al-Ṣārum in San'a, whose grandfather (David), in turn, had acquired it in 1795 from a certain Abraham al-Manzeli, who, in turn, purchased it from the sons of Haroun Cohen-Iraqi, the grandchild of Aharon ha-Cohen Iraqi who purchased the codex in Egypt. They were driven to do so because of their extreme privation. Abraham Firkovich (1786–1874) mentions also the codex in his writings. Sapir heaps lavish praises on the codex:

...Also the precious Bible codex, the peculiar treasure of kings, in an extraordinarily beautiful handwriting upon parchment, which he (al-Ousta) had brought with him from Egypt or from Persia, it also was sold by his children's children in their poverty

The first volume of the book is adorned with an illuminated frontispiece and other decorative pages, showing a printed seven-branched candlestick and its appurtenances, using an old squeezing technique to produce a relief effect with gold tracings. In the words of Sapir, the codex measures "two-thirds of a cubit in length, and one-half of a cubit in width." It is written upon smooth and thin parchment that was split in half, having the same texture on both its sides. The layout of the codex is made with three columns to a page, with thirty lines to each column. The beginning of the codex contains a genealogical record thought to belong to its original owner, Sar-Shalom the nasi, who traces his lineage back to King David and to the First Man, Adam. The same genealogical record appears on p. 768 in the 13th and early 14th century Shem Ṭov Bible (Hebrew: כתר שם טוב) described by bibliophile David Solomon Sassoon (see Sassoon MS. no. 82), which leads to the conclusion that it may have been a standard form used at that time in codices. However, Sapir, in counting the number of generations that had passed since Sar-Shalom's ancestor, Bostanai, reasons that the time-frame given for this man who acquired the codex would have roughly been accurate.

=== Date of manuscript ===
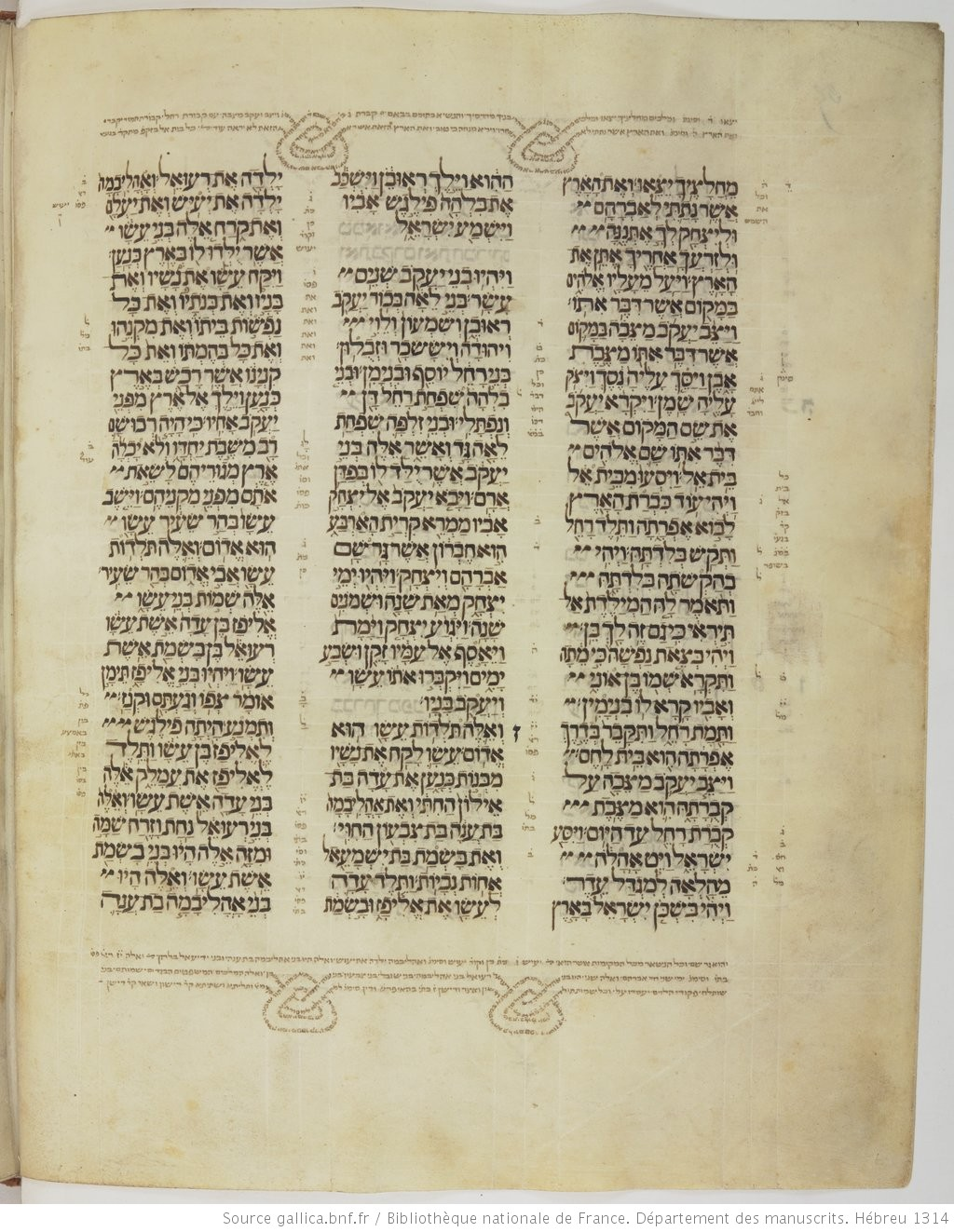
Page from the Book of Genesis (Al-Ousta Codex)

A date found written in the colophon has given rise to some confusion, as the date is written as a biblical verse taken from Deuteronomy 31:22: "[Herein] written and signed on this seventh day of the [lunar] month Adar, in the year we-yiḫtov mošeh eṯ ha-šīrah hazoṯ, in the year of creation" (Hebrew: ויכתב משה את השירה הזאת), with only those letters highlighted whose numerical values are to be translated into real numbers. According to Sapir, the author of the colophon has highlighted only 5 Hebrew characters, which are כתב מש and which letters have the numerical value of 762. Considering that the original owner wrote only the abbreviated era, by adding the millennial year 4 to the number, it means that he wrote this colophon in the year 4762 anno mundi, corresponding with 1002 CE, or which Sapir acknowledges was 870 years before his own time of writing his Iben Safir in 1872 CE. Sapir adds that had the writer intended to highlight all eight letters (over which a line had been drawn), it would put the writing of the colophon in the year 4783 anno mundi (corresponding with year 1023 CE). The problem with these configurations is that it would put the writing of the codex much earlier than the period that is known for the style of Sephardic script used in the manuscript. This led Sapir to conclude that the date may actually refer to the time of the giving of the Masorah (Masoretic text), or to something else, but not necessarily to the writing of the codex. Most scholars agree that the manuscript was written in either the 14th or 15th century CE.

=== Tradition of orthography ===
While most of the orthography of the text follows the Sephardic tradition in plene and defective scriptum, there are some things in common with the Yemenite Jewish tradition, such as writing Potiphera (in Genesis 41:45; p. 39a in codex) as one word, and making use of only 67 lines in Shirat Ha'azinu (Deut. 32:1–43), just as found in the Yemenite tradition. In the line arrangement of Shirat Hayam in Exodus 15:1–19 (p. 53a in codex), the last line follows the emendation made by R. Meir ben Todros Halevi (ca. 1170–1244), and which the Sephardic communities adhered to.

== Aharon haCohen-Iraqi ==
The codex was bought by Aharon haCohen Iraqi, the wealthy minter of the king's coins, in the early 1700s, and who bequeathed the same codex to his great-grandson, Aharon (Haroun) b. Yihya b. Shalom haCohen Iraqi. This family was renowned in San'a and had received the honorable epithet "al-Ousta," meaning the "skilled artisan." They were philanthropists who built several synagogues (one bearing the name "al-Ousta') and a public bath in San'a to be used by the Jewish community there. The codex purchased by this wealthy family's ancestor subsequently passed several hands of ownership, until, eventually, it was purchased by Sapir in San'a, and taken with him to France.
