= Zechariah ha-Rofé =

15th-century Yemenite Jewish scholar

- הרז"ה
- Born: Yiḥye b. Suleiman al-Dhamari c. 15th-century Yemen
- Other names: Yiḥye al-Ṭabib
- Occupation(s): Rabbi, physician, biblical commentator
- Medical career
- Notable works: Midrash ha-Hefez

Zechariah ha-Rofé, or "Zechariah the physician" (Hebrew acronym: Harazah= הרז"ה), also known as Yiḥye al-Ṭabib, was a Yemenite Jewish scholar of the 15th-century, renowned for his authorship of the work, Midrash ha-Ḥefetz, a commentary and collection of homilies on the Five Books of Moses (Pentateuch) and on the readings from the Prophets which he began to write in 1430, and concluded some years later. The work is unique in that he incorporates therein Aristotelian and Platonic philosophy translated from Greek into Arabic, along with the teachings of Maimonides (1138–1204), and the philosophical notions expressed by Abu Nasr al-Farabi (c. 870–950), whom he cites in his work. The author makes use of three languages in his discourse, Hebrew, Judeo-Arabic, and Aramaic, interchanging between them whenever he sees fit. All sections of the Judeo-Arabic texts have been translated into Hebrew by Meir Havazelet in his 1990–1992 revised editions of the work, to accommodate a largely Hebrew-speaking readership.

In later years, Zechariah ha-Rofé also wrote a commentary on his Midrash ha-Ḥefetz at the behest of one of his students, in an attempt to elucidate sections where the author had promised to expand more on the allegorical subjects he addressed but had failed to do so, calling it al-Durra al-Muntakhaba ("the Choice Pearl").

In nearly all of Zechariah ha-Rofé's works, he makes use of homilies, agadot and edifying stories drawn from other rabbinic sources, such as from the Midrash HaGadol and the Talmud, but which, in some cases, the sources are no longer known or extant. He also cites the names of certain rabbinic sages who are not named in other rabbinic literature, in addition to citing works that are no longer extant.

== Background ==
At the time of the composition of Midrash ha-Ḥefetz, Zechariah lived in Masna'a Bani Qays, a small village in Yemen situated between San'a and Dhamar, although, originally, his paternal line hailed from the city of Dhamar. His birth-name is given as Yiḥye b. Suleiman al-Dhamari. Because of his skills as a medical practitioner, he became widely known as "the Physician," besides the coincidental fact that his surname in Arabic (= Ṭabib) also denotes a physician. As with many Jewish surnames, a distant relative's profession was often applied to the family name in recognition of that ancestor and his pedigree. In Yemenite Jewish custom, the name Yiḥye is often interchanged with the Hebrew name Zechariah.

During the author's lifetime, a devastating plague afflicted the population of Yemen, between the years 1434 and 1436, in which many of its inhabitants perished.

Be apprised that in the year 1747 of the Seleucid era (= 1436 CE), there was a very great plague, and epidemic, and death, and of the people none remained other than a few in most cities. The epidemic moved from city to city, while many of the people [that had fallen] were left unburied. It would linger in a city for a period of forty days, and after this period, it would move on. And anyone who went from a city where the epidemic had visited, he would pass-on [the disease] unto [other] people, and the people of the other city would die, and anyone who took away anything of the precious objects of the dead, he too died. Those remaining of the people became [like] kings over the city while those who had been downtrodden became rulers and those who had been poor became rich.

== Midrash ha-Ḥefetz ==
Midrash ha-Ḥefetz, also spelt Midrash ha-Hefez, is unique among Hebrew midrashic literature, as it is not only a collection of biblical homiletic expositions, but is a commentary on difficult phrases and words of the Torah. Many of these difficult words and expressions have been collected and arranged in a separate volume of Indices, published by the editor. Midrash ha-Ḥefetz also incorporates philosophical notions derived from Greek and Arab philosophers, where they were thought to be in agreement with the teachings of Israel's sages. Philosophical ideas drawn from Maimonides' Guide for the Perplexed are also employed in his work. In this work, Zechariah ha-Rofé also expounds on the meaning of the accompanying verses of the Haftara, in its several sections.

Many of the hermeneutical principles used by the Sages of Israel in biblical exegesis are explained in the prologue of Midrash ha-Ḥefetz.

In some cases, Zechariah ha-Rofé deviates from the conventional explanation of biblical verses and offers novel explanations of his own. Thus, in the verse which says (Leviticus 19:18): "Thou shalt love thy neighbour as thyself" (ואהבת לרעך כמוך), and where "loving one's neighbour" is traditionally understood in the context of "as one's own self," meaning, whatsoever is unpleasant to one's own self, he should refrain from doing the like of which to his neighbour, here, Zechariah explains its sense as meaning that one is to look upon his neighbour's opinion as though it were his own opinion and worthy of respect, with an emphasis on "one's neighbour being equal to himself".

=== Other works ===
Zechariah ha-Rofé also compiled a medicinal work in the Judeo-Arabic script, entitled Kitāb al-Wajīz ("The abridged book"), in which he opens with the unequivocal claim that the "cupping therapy (withdrawing of blood from the body by the use of suction cups) (Note: Cf. Babylonian Talmud (Avodah Zarah 29a), which speaks about "the incisions made for the application of suction cups," or literally "horns." Other places in the Talmud where this practice is alluded to are Shabbat 108b, 129a; Ketubbot 39b; Sanhedrin 93b; Makkot 21a; Niddah 67a and Moed Qatan 28a.) and cauterization (the application of a hot iron to one's forehead) (Note: The application of a hot iron to the forehead of a child who was stricken with fever finds support in the Babylonian Talmud (Hullin 8a), where it states: "...and the effect of the hot iron comes and removes the traces of the stroke.") are the most basic essentials of the medical practice, although a person's recovery [from his ailment] is dependent solely upon God." The former was practised in Yemen by making an incision in the lower back of the neck and withdrawing blood with the aid of small horns. Kitāb al-Wajīz is divided into three primary sections: 1) The composition of the human body and its temperament, the signs of diseases and bloodletting; 2) List of different drugs, their substitutes and their effect; and 3) The list of organs and their prescription drugs. (In this last section are 40 chapters).

Nearly all of the medicinal work follows the practices prevalent in the Middle Ages, and makes use of remedies found in the works of Hippocrates (c. 460–370 BCE), of Galen (200–129 BCE) and of Maimonides. Occasionally, however, the author brings down superstitious practices (supernatural cures) as a remedy for certain ailments, such as spitting into a frog's mouth and releasing the frog in water to abort an unwanted pregnancy, or to hang the skin of a donkey or a wolf's canine tooth and its skin to a child who is disturbed by excessive fear. There is also a detailed description of charms and amulets and of their usage in affecting healing or protection.

The medicinal work, of which only two manuscripts survive, is still in manuscript form.

According to S. Schecter, other materials once comprised the work Midrash ha-Ḥefetz, such as the riddles posed by the Queen of Sheba to King Solomon, although these excerpts are not found in the edition of Midrash ha-Ḥefetz published by Meir Havazelet. Schecter published his findings in a different publication, and which are now a part of the manuscript collections in the British Museum (with four copies: Or. 2351, Or. 2380, Or. 2381 and Or. 2382). The Bodleian Library at the University of Oxford (see Dr. Neubauer's Catalogue, No. 2492) and the Royal Library in Berlin also possess copies of this Midrash (The Riddles of Solomon).

In Sharḥ al-Ḥibbūr (A commentary on Maimonides' Mishneh Torah), Zechariah ha-Rofé lays down the halachic practices prevalent in Israel in his day, and notes that, with respect to the holiday of Passover, the custom in Yemen was for Jews to take-up 1 1/2 loaves of unleavened bread (matzah) whenever eating during the entire 7 days of Passover, even on a Sabbath day.

Rabbi Zechariah ha-Rofé also bequeathed a number of philosophical Questions & Responsa in Judeo-Arabic, and which have lately seen publication with a Hebrew translation.

== Works ==
- Midrash ha-Ḥefetz
- al-Durra al-Muntakhaba ("The Choice Pearl"), being a commentary on the Midrash ha-Ḥefetz where he elucidates difficult words
- Kitāb al-Wajīz ("The Abridged Book"), a medicinal work
- A midrashic commentary on the Haftara, published in a separate volume by Yehuda Levi-Nahum in 1949 (incorporated also in the Midrash ha-Ḥefetz)
- A midrashic commentary on Megillat Esther, published by Yehuda Levi-Nahum (incorporated also in the Midrash ha-Ḥefetz, where it discusses Amalek in Parashat Beshalach)
- A midrashic commentary on the Book of Lamentations
- A midrashic commentary on the Song of Songs, written in Judeo-Arabic and explained allegorically, being a reprint of his commentary on Song of Songs taken from the Midrash ha-Ḥefetz and accompanied with a Hebrew translation. Published by Yosef Qafih in his book, The Five Scrolls.
- Sharḥ al-Ḥibbūr, also known as Nimūqei harav Zechariah ha-Rofé (A commentary on Maimonides' Mishneh Torah, in which he explains the difficult passages of his work, and treats on Maimonides' enumeration of the 613 biblical commands; he elucidates the text by presenting a question and then answering it). A rare document of this work can be seen at the National Library of Israel in Jerusalem, Department of Manuscripts, in microfilm # F- 44265.
- A commentary on Maimonides' Guide for the Perplexed (composed in Judeo-Arabic, and entitled, Sharḥ ʻalei al-delāleh)
- A commentary on Maaseh Merkabah, found in the Book of Ezekiel, entitled Pirūsh al-Merkabah, or Sharḥ nevū’ath Yeḥezḳel.

== Bibliography ==
- Fisch, Solomon, ed. (1957). Midrash Haggadol on the Pentateuch (Numbers) (in Hebrew). Vol. 1. London: L. Honig & Sons. OCLC 1049027075.
- Havazelet, Meir, ed. (1990). Midrash ha-Ḥefetz (in Hebrew). Vol. 1. Jerusalem: Mossad Harav Kook. OCLC 23773577.
- Havazelet, Meir, ed. (1992). Midrash ha-Ḥefetz (in Hebrew). Vol. 2. Jerusalem: Mossad Harav Kook. OCLC 23773577.
- Havazelet, Meir, ed. (1999). Midrash Ha-Ḥefeṣ - A Yemenite Midrash on the Pentateuch by Rabbi Zekharyah Ben Shelomo Ha-Rofe (in Hebrew). Vol. 3 (Indices [& Errata]). Tel Aviv: Afikim Publishing House. OCLC 152713893.
- Levi Nahum, Yehuda (1971). Greidi, Shimon (ed.). Ḥasifat genuzim mi-Teman (Revelation of ancient Yemenite treasures) (in Hebrew). Holon, Israel: Mifal Hasifat Ginze Teman. OCLC 474697820.
- Levi Nahum, Yehuda (1996). Tobi, Yosef (ed.). Sefer ha-teʻudah mi-mifʻal ḥaśifat ginze Teman (in Hebrew). Ḥolon (Israel): Afiḳim. pp. 52–119. OCLC 35214321.
- Margalioth, Mordechai, ed. (2003). Encyclopedia of Great Men in Israel (Being a Biographical Dictionary of Jewish Sages and Scholars from the 9th to the End of the 18th Century) (in Hebrew). Vol. 1. Tel-Aviv: Yavneh Publishing House. OCLC 52841127.
- Qafiḥ, Yosef (1962). The Five Scrolls (Ḥamesh Megillot) (in Hebrew). Jerusalem: ha-Agudah le-hatsalat ginze Teman. OCLC 927095961.
- Qafiḥ, Yosef (1989). Yosef Tobi (ed.). Ketavim (Collected Papers) (in Hebrew). Vol. 1. Jerusalem: Eʻeleh betamar, et al. OCLC 61623627.
- Qafih, Y., ed. (2011), "Hil. Ḥametz u'matzah", Sefer Mishneh Torah (in Hebrew), vol. 4 (Zemanim) (4 ed.), Kiryat Ono: Mekhon mishnat ha-Rambam, OCLC 187478401
- Ratzaby, Yehudah [in Hebrew] (1995). Yemenite Jewish Literature - Authors and their Writings (in Hebrew). Kiriat Ono: Makhon Moshe.
- Tobi, Yosef [in Hebrew] (1989–1990). "Medical Books of Yemenite Jewry". Jerusalem Studies in Jewish Folklore (in Hebrew). 11/12: 102–120. JSTOR 23356313. (Kitāb al-Wajīz is described on pp. 106–111; 117–120)
