= Midrash ha-Hefez =

1430 book by Yihye ibn Suleiman al-Dhamari

Midrash ha-Ḥefez (lit. "Midrash of desire"), or "Commentary of the Book of the Law", is a Hebrew midrash written by the physician and Rabbi, Yihye ibn Suleiman al-Dhamari, otherwise known as Zechariah ben Solomon ha-Rofé, which he began to write in 1430 in Yemen and concluded some years later. The work contains commentaries and homilies on the Pentateuch, Book of Esther, and Book of Lamentations, as well as a commentary on the haftarot, written in a mixture of Hebrew, Aramaic and Judeo-Arabic. A commentary exists under the name "al-Durra al-Muntakhaba".

== Content ==
The midrash covering the Five Books of Moses is characterized as both a midrash and as a commentary. It is full of philosophical and scientific topics, as was common during the Middle Ages in Yemen. The author was greatly influenced by all of Maimonides' books, but especially by his philosophical thought. Many of the homilies contained in the midrash are written in the form of an allegory which, in this case, differs from the literary style of Maimonides. The work is written mostly in Judeo-Arabic, like much other Jewish scholarship at the time.

According to S. Schecter, other materials once comprised the work Midrash ha-Hefez, such as the riddles posed by the Queen of Sheba to King Solomon, although these excerpts are not found in the edition of Midrash ha-Hefez published by Meir Havazelet. Schecter published his findings in a different publication, and which are now a part of the manuscript collections in the British Library (with four copies: Or. 2351, Or. 2380, Or. 2381 and Or. 2382). The Bodleian Library at the University of Oxford (see Dr. Neubauer’s Catalogue, No. 2492) and the Royal Library in Berlin also possess copies of this Midrash (The Riddles of Solomon).

The midrashic work contains a wisdom contest between King Solomon and the Queen of Sheba. It is noted as part of a long literary tradition about these figures, and for its inclusion of a number of Hebrew riddles:

- There is an enclosure with ten doors: when one is open nine are shut; when nine are open, one is shut. — The womb, the bodily orifices, and the umbilical cord.
- Living, moves not, yet when its head is cut off it moves. — A ship in the sea (made from a tree).
- What was that which is produced from the ground, yet produces it, while its food is the fruit of the ground? — A wick.

== Editions and translations ==
The Midrash ha-Ḥefez was translated into Hebrew by Rabbi Dr. Meir Havazelet, and published by Mossad Harav Kook in Jerusalem (1990) - Genesis and Exodus; and in 1992 - Leviticus, Numbers, and Deuteronomy, and contains an Introduction by Rabbi Yosef Qafih.

== Manuscripts ==
- Enelow Collection, at the Jewish Theological Seminary of America, Ms. 4898 (139)
- Jewish Theological Seminary of America, Ms. 1642 (contains the Prologue of Zechariah ha-Rofé's Midrash ha-Hefez)
- Jewish Theological Seminary of America, Ms. 4953 (containing a complete epilogue of Midrash ha-Hefez)
- Jewish Theological Seminary of America, Ms. 5261 (contains pages from Leviticus 1:4–Deuteronomy 23:17, with occasional missing pages in the middle)
- Jewish Theological Seminary of America, Ms. 275 (excerpts taken from Midrash ha-Hefez)
- Yehuda Levi-Nahum Ms. (containing only portions of the midrash, from Parashat Tzav to Parashat Balak)
- Hebrew University National Library of Israel at the Hebrew University campus in Jerusalem, Ms. no. 40759
- British Museum Ms. (described in Margalioth's catalogue of Hebrew manuscripts, vol. 2, p. 2351, under no. 363, and containing only the midrash for the Book of Genesis, with its Haftara sections. Dated to the 16th-century.)
- Sassoon Ms. no. 262 (lacking many pages)
- Sassoon Ms. no. 900 (lacking many pages)
- Qafih Ms. (partially corrupt with many copyist errors)
- British Library, Or. 2381 (Midrash ha-ḥefets by Zechariah ben Solomon ha-Rofe) Online view
- British Library, Or. 2382 (Midrash ha-ḥefets by Zechariah ben Solomon ha-Rofe) Online view
