= Shukr Kuhayl I =

Shukr ben Salim Kuhayl I (?–1865), also known as Mari (Master) Shukr Kuhayl I (Hebrew: מרי שכר כחיל), was a Yemenite messianic claimant of the 19th century. He initially revealed himself in Sanaa in 1861 as a messenger of the Messiah at a time when Jewish messianic expectations in Ottoman Yemen were ripe as a result of political turmoil. Divorcing his wife, he took up the life of an itinerant preacher to live in poverty and exhort the community to repentance. "I come to warn you and to remind you of repentance and redemption," he is reported to have said when publicly announcing his mission on a Sabbath in May 1861.

He was apparently a humble, ascetic and pious individual, wearing ragged clothes, and removing himself to live alone on Mount Tiyal. At some point he began to indicate that he was no longer the messenger of the Messiah, but rather the Messiah himself. He inscribed messianic formulas on his hands, and "corrected" Isaiah 45:1 to read כה אמר ה' למשיחו לשוכר ("Thus said the Lord to Shukr, His anointed one...") instead of the traditional כה אמר ה' למשיחו לכורש ("Thus said the Lord to Cyrus, His anointed one..."), in this manner reading himself into the Biblical narrative.

The Jewish traveler Jacob Saphir, who wrote about Shukr Kuhayl in the Jerusalem press and in his Even Sappir, indicated that almost all the Jews of Yemen at that time believed the messianic claims of Shukr Kuhayl I.

Although Kuhayl was very shortly thereafter killed by local Arabs in 1865 – apparently under direction of the imam controlling the capital of Sanaa, who viewed his activities as a threat—there were many among his followers who did not accept his demise, and expected his imminent return. Among these were his sister and son, who did not mourn his death. They were soon enough rewarded in 1868 by the appearance of Judah ben Shalom, claiming to be the self-same recently deceased Shukr Kuhayl, who then went on to lead a very significant messianic movement, which attracted both Yemenite Jews and Arabs.

== See also ==
- Jewish Messiah claimants
