= Judah ben Shalom =

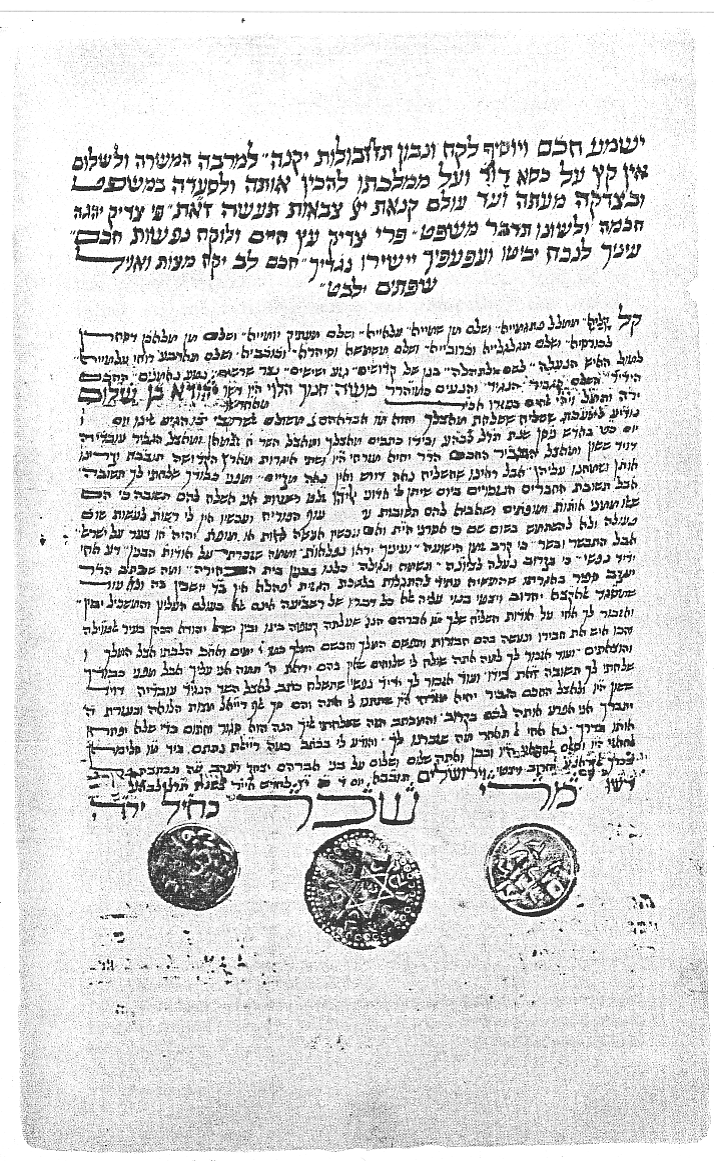
A letter of Mari Shukr Kuhayl II (Judah ben Shalom), published in 1907 by David Sassoon in the Jewish Quarterly Review, v. 19, p. 163.

Judah ben Shalom (died c. 1878) (Hebrew: יהודה בן שלום), also known as Mori (Master) Shooker Kohail II or Shukr Kuhayl II (מרי שכר כחיל), was a Yemenite messianic claimant of the mid-19th century.

== Rise ==
Judah ben Shalom was either a potter or a cobbler hailing from Sanaa, Yemen, and was evidently an accomplished kabbalist. He announced to the Jews of Yemen in March 1868 that he was in fact the self-same messianic claimant known as Shukr Kuhayl I, who had been killed and decapitated by Arabs just three years prior, now resurrected by Elijah. The exact manner in which Judah ben Shalom was able to take over the identity of the deceased Shukr Kuhayl, and in so doing to completely erase his own personal history, must remain something of a mystery.

The new (or renewed) Shukr Kuhayl continued to preach the message of repentance that Yemenite Jews were familiar with from prior messiahs, as well as from local religious tradition. To the Jews he proclaimed that he was the Messiah sent to redeem them, while to the Arabs he announced that he was a Muslim sent to proclaim the arrival of the Mahdi. It seems that his repertoire did not include miracle-working, and he addresses this conspicuous failure in some of his letters. The main reason given is that God has not yet permitted him to undertake miracle-working, and that (naturally) God's permission is merely waiting for the moment when the Jews finally unite behind their Messiah.

Unlike Shukr Kuhayl I, who worked mainly in the capacity of itinerant preacher, Judah ben Shalom developed a significant organizational structure which may have included hundreds of functionaries. From his headquarters, which was successively in Tan'im, al-Ṭawīlah, al-Qaranī, and again Tan'im, he coordinated a vast correspondence with the Jewish leaders in other communities of Yemen, Aden, Alexandria, Bombay, Calcutta, Jerusalem, and Safed, mainly for the purposes of acquiring funds. It is from this correspondence that we have our largest source of information about Judah ben Shalom's activities in this period. In contrast to Shukr Kuhayl I, who during his short messianic career pursued an ascetic life of seclusion and poverty, Shukr Kuhayl II presents the appearance of a con-man artfully manipulating individuals and the community at large for his own advantage.

Beyond Judah ben Shalom's exhortations to repentance (which were characteristic also of his predecessor Shukr Kuhayl I, and of other Yemenite messiahs), his correspondence is distinguished by its encouragement of the paying of a tithe (ma'aser) to his organization. Various motivations and efficacies for the tithe are given in his correspondence —among them salvation from the "pangs of the Messiah"—and these solicitations appear by all reports to have been hugely successful. According to one report, the Jews of Aden forwarded to Kuhayl the complete treasury of their synagogue. He ultimately gained a large following among the Jews of Yemen (as well as many Arabs), who continued to contribute large sums of money to his cause. The utilization of these funds—whether they were distributed to the poor, used to buy protection, or used to finance Kuhayl's own luxurious lifestyle—is a matter of conflicting report.

Shukr Kuhayl II was not without his critics, even within Yemen. He was opposed by individuals who had personally known the first Shukr Kuhayl, and who regarded Shukr Kuhayl II's excessive lifestyle as incompatible with the modesty of the person they had known. Lenowitz quotes some letters that express this resentment. Kuhayl II's greatest antagonist, however, was Jacob Saphir of Jerusalem, who ultimately played a major role in ending the messiah's career.

== Reasons for his success ==
The reasons for the profound success of messianic movements in Yemen in so recent a period as the late 1800s are varied, although in light of even more recent messianic activity—such as that occurring within Lubavitch Hasidism—it is perhaps no longer so difficult to comprehend. However, to a Wissenschaft-influenced writer like Sassoon, the only plausible explanation is the deficiency of Yemenite intellectual culture:

In all ages there have been pretenders and false messiahs amongst Jews, but in Yemen they have been very numerous, no doubt because the Yemen Jew is credulous and lacks erudition. His studies are principally confined to the Zohar and books on קבלה "Cabbala," סגולות "cabbalistic practices," רפואות "cures," גורלות "casting of lots," and קמיעות "talismans." Many of them shut themselves up for days, and imagine that they are speaking to the angel Gabriel and other celestial beings...

— Sassoon (1907)

While Sassoon has the advantage of proximity to events—living almost contemporaneously with the messianic movement he is describing, one can question the fairness of some of these remarks, especially inasmuch as they are not paralleled in Saphir's accounts. It does seem the case that the Yemenite Jews were indeed given to a certain fascination with messianic paraphernalia, including calculations of redemption, apocalyptic visions, the Lost Tribes, etc., but this alone does not account for their susceptibility to messianic pretense.

An additional ingredient was the manner in which the Yemenite messiahs took advantage of two unique features of Yemenite Judaism. Firstly, the Yemenite Jewish culture placed great importance on individual and communal repentance (along with the dire consequences of inadequate repentance), and the messiahs took advantage of this by incorporating into their messages pious and emotionally powerful calls for communal repentance in the face of impending dangers. As a result of the hyper-piety of the messiahs' messages, communal leaders found it very difficult to reject the messenger. Secondly, the tradition among Yemenite Jews of memorizing the entire Tanakh made it easy for a knowledgeable individual such as Kuhayl II to sound eminently "messianic" by artfully weaving into his writings (and no doubt into his speeches) verses from the Nevi'im and Ketuvim. His Yemenite readers would immediately recognize these verses and their prophetic origins, which no doubt lent tremendous authority to the messiah's message, and again made the messenger difficult to reject.

All in all, what seems likely is that the suppuration of messianic activity in Yemen was made possible by weak Jewish leadership in the face of a dismal and chaotic political situation within a community that was largely isolated from the rest of Jewish culture, circumstances which were little changed from those which prompted Maimonides to write his famous Letter to Yemen (Igeret Taiman) in the 12th century, in which he expressed his concern about the lax response of Yemenite leadership to an anonymous pseudo-messiah of that earlier period. In regard to the present episode, Lenowitz considers it within the framework of the entire history of Yemenite messianic activity in the following way:

The leaders of the Yemenite Jewish community would continue to play the role in which they appear in the Letter [to Yemen]: they were indecisive; they were noncondemnatory; they were swayed by their own longings; they understood and sympathized with their people; and they could not but respect the messiahs for the conduct they preached, even while fearing the outcome of their claims and the threat their movements made to the peaceful, if lowly, life of the Jews of Yemen under Moslem despotism. The local Jewish communities—San'a', in particular—would also play the part outlined for them in the Letter; the repression and the occasional instability in the society would recur; and Yemen, finally, comes to present a strikingly unified messiah history that spans a period of over 600 years.

== Demise ==
Eventually, it was Jacob Saphir's 1872 Igeret Taiman (consciously borrowing the title of Rambam's earlier Epistle), countering the messianic claims of Judah ben Shalom, and signed by the rabbis of Jerusalem, which led to a deterioration in Kuhayl's stature among the community leaders controlling his cash flow. As the income diminished, he was forced to borrow money from wealthy Arabs, and—evidently defaulting on these loans—was finally taken to jail. Released after some time, he was not able to regain his former acclaim, and died in poverty around 1878.

== See also ==
- Jewish Messiah claimants
- List of Messiah claimants
