= Alte Bibliothek =

Library building in Berlin, Germany

Coordinates: 52°30′59″N 13°23′35″E

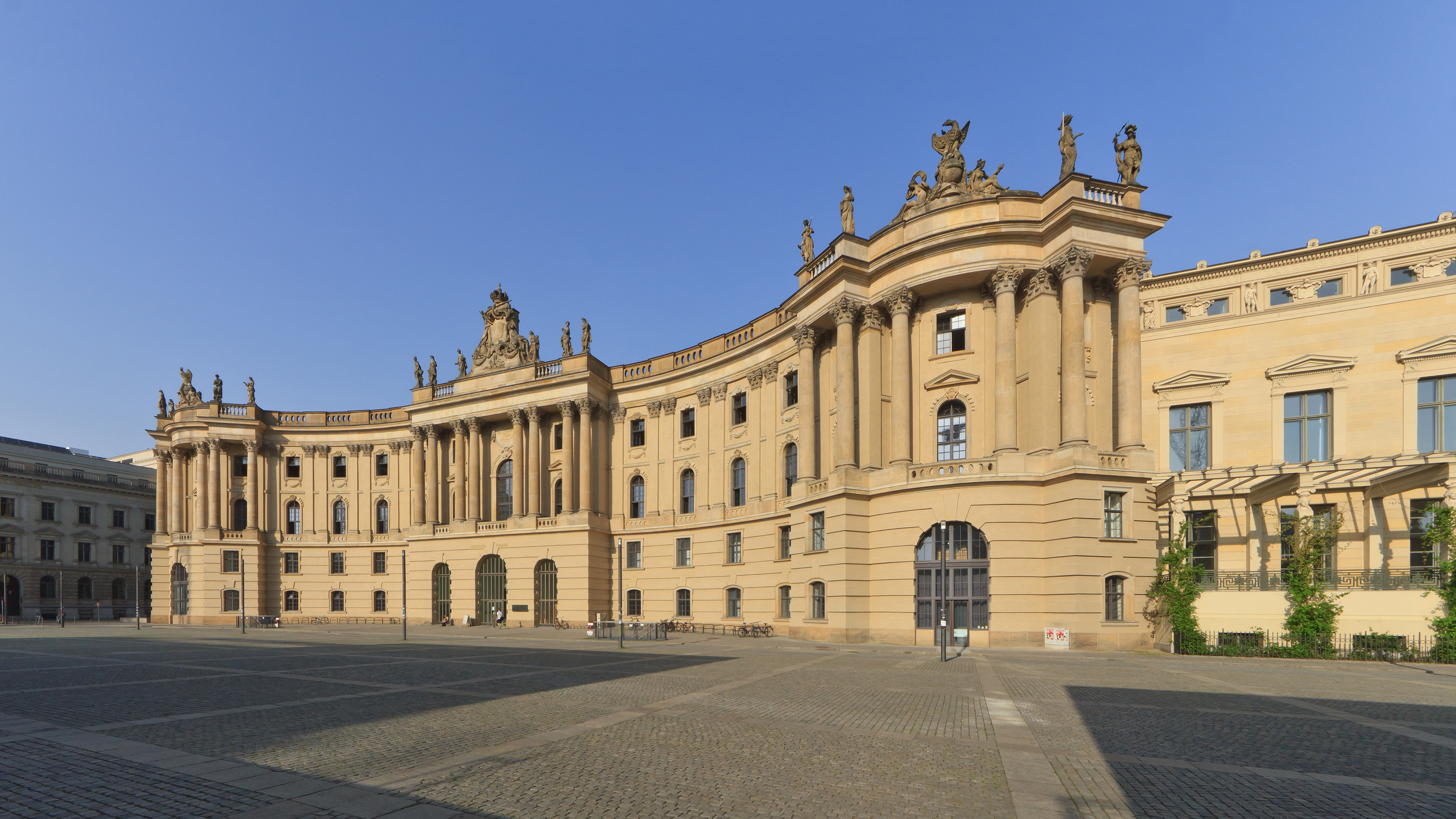
Alte Bibliothek

The Alte Bibliothek (lit. 'Old Library'), nicknamed Kommode (Commode), is a listed building on Bebelplatz in the historic centre of Berlin. It was erected by order of Frederick the Great from 1774 to 1780 according to plans by Georg Christian Unger and Georg Friedrich Boumann in Baroque style. Older plans by Joseph Emanuel Fischer von Erlach for St. Michael's Wing of Vienna Hofburg served as a basis for the first freestanding library building of Berlin. Damaged during the Allied bombing in World War II, the former Royal Prussian Library was rebuilt from 1963 to 1969 as part of the Forum Fridericianum. Since then, the Alte Bibliothek has been home to the law faculty of the Humboldt-Universität.
