= Jacob Saphir =

Hebrew researcher, ethnographer, and emissary (1822–1886)

- יעקב הלוי ספיר
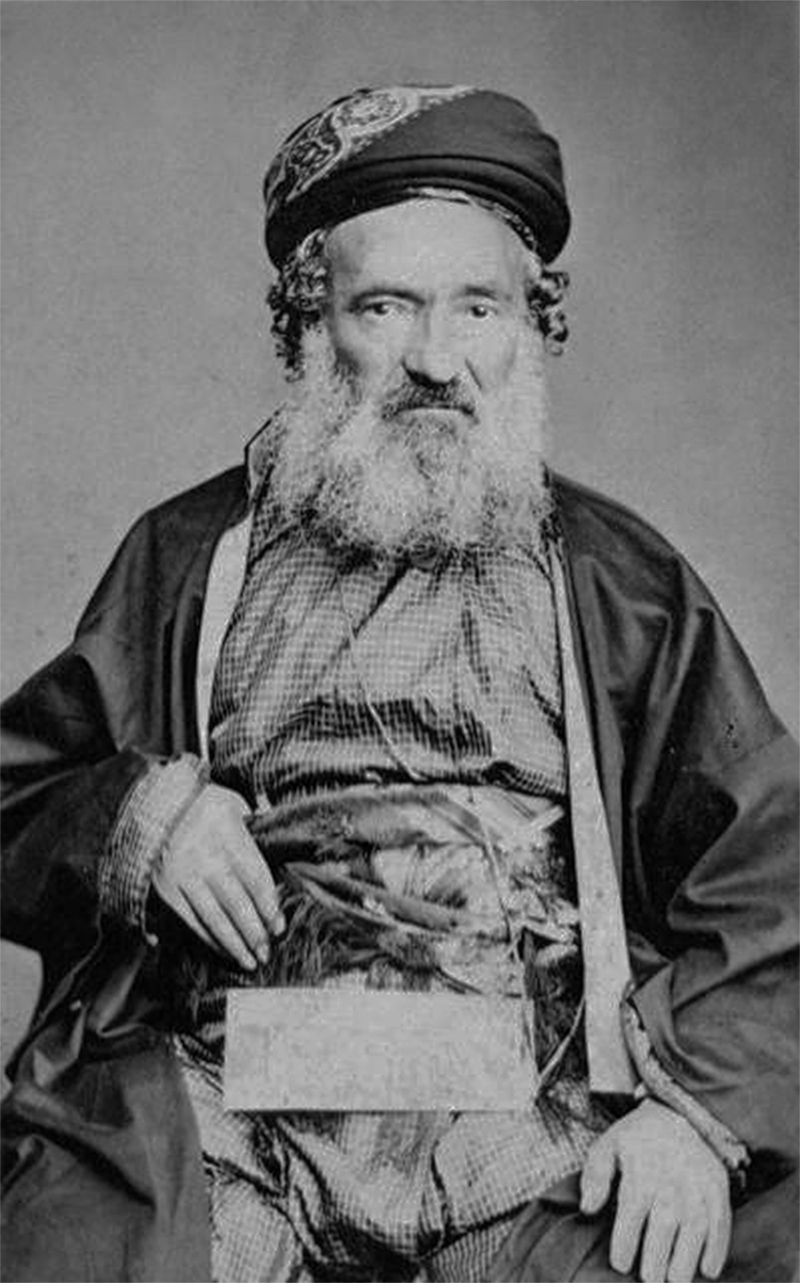
- Jacob Saphir
- Born: 1822; Ashmyany, Russian Empire (now Belarus)
- Died: 1886 (aged 63–64); Jerusalem, Ottoman Palestine
- Occupations: Writer; Ethnographer; Researcher
- Known for: Even Sapir; Research on the Cairo Geniza; Discovering the Midrash ha-Gadol
- Notable work: Even Sapir; Iggeret Teman

Jacob Saphir (Hebrew: יעקב הלוי ספיר, romanized: Yankev HaLeyvy Sapir; 1822–1886), often pronounced Yaakov Sapir, was a 19th-century writer, ethnographer, researcher of Hebrew manuscripts, a traveler and emissary of the rabbis of Eastern European Jewish descent who settled in Jerusalem during his early life.

== Background ==
Saphir was born in Ashmyany in the Russian Empire (now Belarus) and immigrated to Ottoman Palestine as a child with his family in 1832. His parents, who were from the Perushim community, settled in Safed. Within a year his father died in 1833. At the age of 12, he witnessed the attack by the Arabs of the Galilee on the Jews of Safed in the lunar month of Sivan, 1834, and shortly after that, his mother died. Taken in by the local rabbinate, he moved to Jerusalem in 1836.

In 1848, he was commissioned by the Jewish community of the latter city to travel through the southern countries to collect alms for the poor of Jerusalem. In 1854 he undertook a second tour to collect funds for the construction of the Hurva Synagogue in the Jewish Quarter, which led him in 1859 to Yemen, British India, Egypt, and Australia.

The result of this journey was his momentous ethnographic work, entitled `Even Sapir, a travel diary and vignette of Jewish life and history in Yemen. Saphir published also Iggeret Teman (Epistle to Yemen) (Wilna, 1868, consciously titled after Rambam's letter of the same name from centuries earlier), a work on the appearance in Yemen of the pseudo-Messiah Judah ben Shalom, and which was largely responsible for ending Judah ben Shalom's career. Saphir died in Jerusalem in 1886.

Saphir was the first Jewish researcher to recognize the significance of the Cairo geniza, as well as the first to publicize the existence of the Midrash ha-Gadol, both later studied by Solomon Schechter.

Sapir also did extensive research and writings on Yanover, Israeli and Greek etrogs. He dedicated a collection of poetry to Sir Moses and Lady Montefiore.

In the years 1833–1885, Saphir helped print the book Ḥemdat Yamim (reprinted Jerusalem 1977) by the arch-poet of Yemen, R. Shalom Shabazi, and even added an introduction to it.

== See also ==
- Al-Ousta Codex

== Jewish Encyclopedia bibliography ==
- Fuenn, Keneset Yisrael, pp. 557–558
- idem, in Ha-Karmel, vi, Wilna, 1866
- Geiger, Abraham, in Jüd. Zeit. xi.263–270
