= Ali bin Abdullah al-Wazir =

Prince Ali bin Abdullah al-Wazir
- Born: 15 June 1885; Bayt al-Sayyid, Bani Hushaysh District, Yemen Vilayet, Ottoman Empire
- Died: 21 June 1948 (aged 63); Hajjah Governorate, Mutawakkilite Kingdom of Yemen
- Cause of death: Execution
- Known for: Leader of the Yemeni armed forces during the reign of Abdullah al-Wazir
- Office: Emir of Taiz Liwa
- Spouse: Fatimah bint Abu Ras
- Children: Ibrahim al-Wazir; Zayd al-Wazir; Ahmad al-Wazir; Qasim al-Wazir; Abbas al-Wazir; Mohammed al-Wazir; Abdullah al-Wazir
- Relatives: Mohammad bin Abdullah al-Wazir; Abdullah al-Wazir; Atyaf al-Wazir

Ali bin Abdullah al-Wazir (15 June 1885 – 21 June 1948) was a Yemeni military commander, politician, and prince of the al-Wazir family. He served as commander of the Yemeni armed forces during the reign of Imam Abdullah al-Wazir and was the Emir of Taiz Liwa in the Mutawakkilite Kingdom of Yemen. He was also one of the leaders of the Constitutional Revolution against Imam Yahya Muhammad Hamid ed-Din.

He was born in Bayt al-Sayyid, a village in Bani Hushaysh District, on 15 June 1885.

== Education ==
At the age of five, al-Wazir enrolled in a traditional school in the al-Abna area of Bani Hushaysh, where he studied the Quran, writing, and basic arithmetic under Sheikh Ahmad Ali Jarallah. He later moved to Al-Rawdah, where he studied Islamic sciences, Quranic recitation, and Arabic grammar at its Grand Mosque under Ali bin Ahmad al-Sadmi and Abdullah bin Abdul Karim Abu Talib. He subsequently moved to Sana'a to continue his studies in its mosques under Ahmad bin Mohammed al-Arasi, Ali Hussein al-Maghribi, and Ali bin Hassan Sanhoub.

== Ottoman period ==
Al-Wazir joined the forces of Imam Yahya Muhammad Hamid ed-Din in fighting the Ottoman Army in Yemen and participated in the siege of Sana'a in 1911. Following the Treaty of Da'an between Imam Yahya and the Ottoman Empire, he served as governor of Bani Matar, al-Basatin, and Haraz from 1912 to 1919.

== Mutawakkilite Kingdom ==
In 1919, al-Wazir led the forces of the Mutawakkilite Kingdom in campaigns to establish control over Taiz Liwa. He suppressed the rebellion in Hubaysh and extended his control over al-Udayn and Dhi Sufal. He also achieved victories in the battles of Jabal Saber and the fortress of al-Maqatirah.

By 1921, he had consolidated control over the entire Taiz Liwa and incorporated it into the Mutawakkilite Kingdom of Yemen. In 1920, he formed the Fourth Liwa Brigade composed entirely of recruits from Taiz Liwa, and in 1927 he established the Eighth Liwa Brigade, also composed entirely of men from Taiz Liwa.

== Constitutional Revolution ==
Al-Wazir participated in the 1948 Constitutional Revolution against Imam Yahya. Following the victory of Imam Ahmad bin Yahya over the revolutionaries, he was imprisoned with other revolutionary leaders in Cairo Castle in Hajjah and was executed on 21 June 1948.

== See also ==
- Yemen Vilayet
- Yemeni–Ottoman conflicts
