= Ahmad Yahya al-Thulaya =

Yemeni colonel (1916–1955)

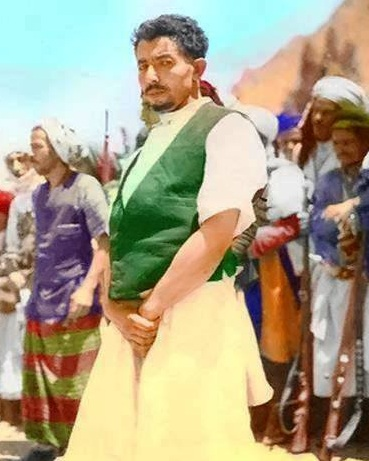
- Ahmad Yahya al-Thulaya
- Born: 1916; Sanaa, Mutawakkilite Kingdom of Yemen (present-day Yemen)
- Died: 13 April 1955 (aged 38–39); Taiz, Mutawakkilite Kingdom of Yemen (present-day Yemen)
- Military career
- Allegiance: Mutawakkilite Kingdom of Yemen
- Branch: Yemen Army
- Service years: ?-1955
- Rank: Colonel
- Conflicts: 1955 Yemeni coup attempt

Ahmad Yahya al-Thulaya (Arabic: أحمد يحيى الثلايا; 1916 - April 13, 1955) was a Yemeni colonel who led the failed 1955 coup against Imam Ahmad bin Yahya, the absolute monarch of the Mutawakkilite Kingdom of Yemen.

== Early life and career ==
Al-Thulaya was born in 1916 in Sanaa. He attended the Dar Al-Aytam school for orphans in Sanaa (future Yemeni prime minister Abdullah al-Sallal was also a student), and later joined the army. He participated in a Yemeni military delegation to Iraq in 1936, where he met many prominent Iraqi officers, including Khalil Dabbagh. After his return to Yemen, he rose through the ranks, becoming the head of a military detachment in the city of Saada, where he remained until the 1948 Al-Waziri coup that sought to overthrow the monarchy.

Although the uprising succeeded in killing the Imam, Yahya Muhammad Hamid ed-Din, it failed to prevent his son, Ahmad bin Yahya, from taking power as Imam. Al-Thulaya had supported the uprising, and afterwards he traveled to Hajjah to seek a pardon from the new imam. He received a pardon, but was made to stay in Hajjah in a state of quasi-detainment. During this time, he became connected with prominent members of the Free Yemeni Movement including Abdul Rahman al-Eryani and Ahmad Muhammad Numan.

He was released in 1950, and was posted to As-Salif, a port north of Al Hudaydah, but removed from this post in 1953 by the imam. He was then appointed as an army instructor in Taiz, then the Yemeni capital.

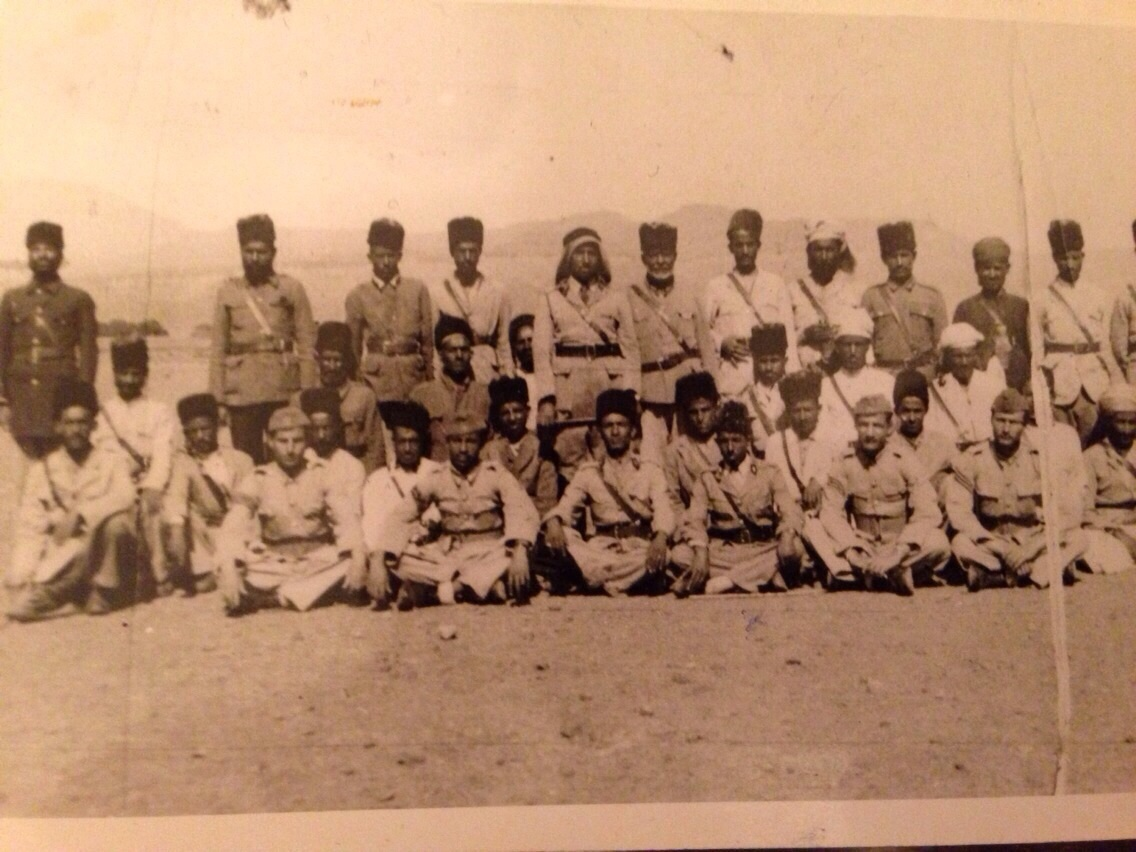
Al-Thulaya, with fellow Yemeni officers and their Iraqi trainers in Iraq, 1935 or 36

== 1955 coup attempt ==
In 1955 Al-Thulaya, now a colonel, took advantage of a mutiny in the Taiz region to march against Imam Ahmad, whose popularity among the army had dimmed. The colonel worked to coordinate with Prince Abdullah bin Yahya, a brother of the Imam, seeking to put him on the throne instead.

After his palace in Taiz was surrounded, Imam Ahmad announced that he would abdicate in favor of his brother Abdullah. However, the Imam secretly bought off some of the rebellious soldiers, and later opened fire on the rebel positions, killing 23 rebels and causing their defeat.

Al-Thulaya attempted to flee to Aden, which was under British control, but was captured by tribesmen loyal to the Imam and returned to Taiz, where he was publicly executed along with some of his fellow coup plotters. The Imam reportedly asked the crowd whether he should be executed, and the crowd gave its assent. Al-Thulaya is said to have responded to the crowd: "I wanted life for you, but you wanted death for me."
