= Al-Wazir =

Al-Wazir (Arabic: الوزير, lit. 'The Minister, The Vizier') is an Arabic-language surname. Notable people with the surname include:

- Abdullah al-Wazir (1885–1948), Yemeni militant and Islamic scholar
- Ali bin Abdullah al-Wazir (1885–1948), Yemeni military commander and politician
- Ibn al-Wazir (755–840), Hadith scholar
- Intissar al-Wazir (born 1941), Palestinian politician
- Jihad al-Wazir (born 1963), Palestinian economist and politician
- Kamel al-Wazir (born 1957), Egyptian politician
- Khalil al-Wazir (1935–1988), Palestinian militant
- Tammam ibn Alqama al-Wazir (803/810–896), high official and poet in the Emirate of Córdoba
- Tarek Al-Wazir (born 1971), German politician
