= 1955 Yemeni coup attempt =

Failed coup d'état

Date	31 March - 6 April 1955
Location	Taiz, Yemen
Result	Coup failed

Belligerents
Army dissidents	Mutawakkilite Kingdom of Yemen

Commanders and leaders
Col. Ahmad Yahya al-Thulaya	Ahmad bin Yahya

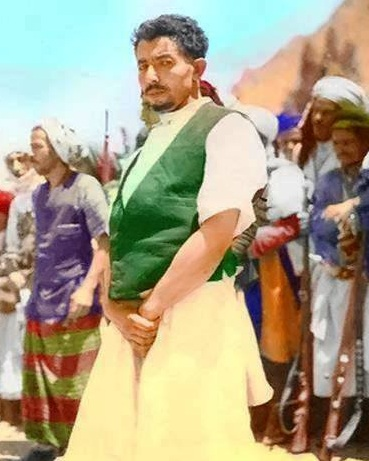
Colonel Ahmad Yahya al-Thulaya, leader of the coup attempt

The 1955 Yemeni coup attempt was a failed coup d'etat in which soldiers led by Colonel Ahmad Yahya al-Thulaya attempted to overthrow Imam Ahmad bin Yahya, who had ruled the Mutawakkilite Kingdom of Yemen since 1948.

== Background ==
In 1948, the Al-Waziri Coup attempted to overthrow the dynasty ruling the kingdom, and succeeded in assassinating then-Imam Yahya Muhammad Hamid ed-Din, Ahmad bin Yahya's father. Around 5,000 people were killed in the coup, which ended with loyalist forces regaining control and Ahmad becoming Imam.

In 1954, Ahmad named his eldest son Muhammad al-Badr as Crown Prince. However, Ahmad's younger brother al-Hassan publicly criticized his choice of al-Badr, leading to confrontations between supporters of the two rivals. Saudi Arabia's King Saud attempted to mediate between the rival factions, pushing for recognition of al-Badr.

It was in this heated environment that Colonel al-Thulaya decided to launch a coup, with the intent of placing another of the Imam's sons, Abdullah, on the throne.

== Events ==
On 30 March 1955, a fight broke out between two soldiers and villagers in the village of Al Hawban, in Taiz Governorate. This prompted members of the garrison in Taiz to retaliate against the villagers, in defiance of the Imam's orders. Al-Thulaya, who had received military training in Iraq, reportedly joined the mutinous soldiers and convinced them to surround the Imam's palace at Al Urdi Square in the kingdom's capital, Taiz, persuading them that the Imam would have them executed upon their return, due to their disobeying his orders. Lieutenant Murshid al-Sarihi led the siege of the Imam's palace, while another group of rebels cut the water supply and telephone lines to the Imam's house, opened the treasury, and occupied government buildings.

Al-Thulaya insisted the Imam abdicate in favor of his half-brother Abdullah, the foreign minister. Imam Ahmad agreed, but secretly began to buy off the rebellious soldiers, reducing their numbers from 600 to 40 over the course of five days. (Other sources claim the number of soldiers surrounding the palace was 1,300.) He then burst out of the palace wielding a scimitar, killing two men before retreating to the palace. Swapping the sword for a submachine gun, he led his guards in an attack against the remaining soldiers. Twenty-three rebels and one palace guard were killed, and both Abdullah and al-Thulaya attempted to flee. The latter tried to escape to Aden, which was under British rule, but was captured by tribal forces loyal to the Imam in the village of al-Wazzam, and was returned to Taiz.

== Aftermath ==
Al-Thulaya was beheaded in Shuhada Square in Taiz, and Abdullah was executed as well. Other participants in the coup attempt were imprisoned, several of whom later played key roles in the successful 1962 revolution.

In the wake of the coup, Yemen's military schools were shuttered. However, members of the military continued to plot against the Imam's rule, and in 1962 a coup led by Abdullah al-Sallal - who, like al-Thulaya, was an army officer who had trained in Iraq in the 1930s - succeeded in overthrowing the monarchy.
