= Muhammad Mahmoud Al-Zubairi =

Yemeni poet, politician and revolutionary (1910–1965)

- محمد محمود الزبيري
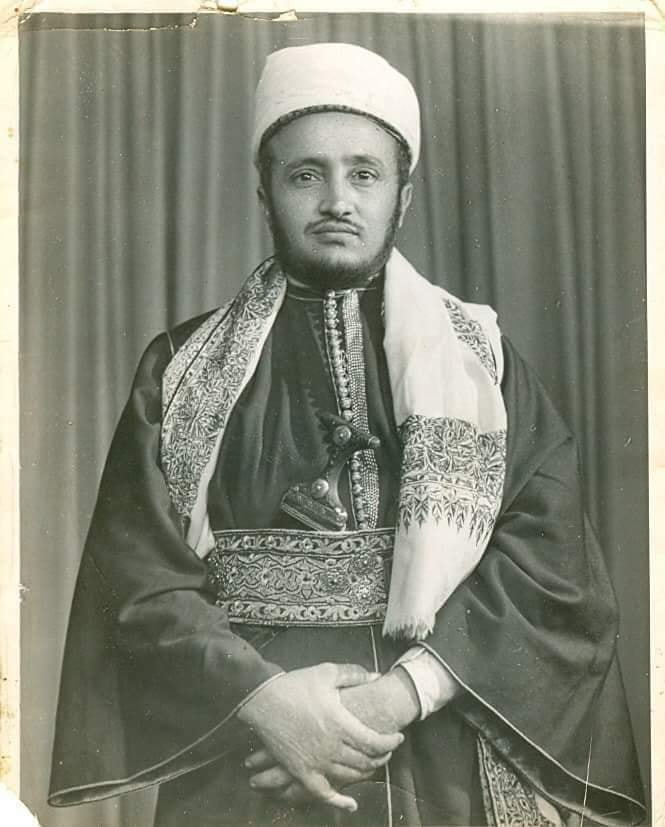
- Born: 1910; Sana'a, Yemen vilayet
- Died: April 1, 1965 (aged 54–55); Bart Al Anan District, Sana'a, Yemen Arab Republic
- Cause of death: Assassination
- Other name: Abu Al-Ahrar
- Education: Cairo University
- Occupations: Poet, politician, and revolutionary
- Political party: Free Yemeni Movement
- Opponent: Kingdom of Yemen

Muhammad Mahmoud Al-Zubairi (Arabic: محمد محمود الزبيري; 1910 – 1 April 1965) was a Yemeni poet, politician, and revolutionary who was assassinated. He is considered to be Yemen's greatest poet in the twentieth century and one of the country's most celebrated authors. He has been known as "Abu Al-Ahrar" (the father of freemen) and "the poet of Yemen".

== Biography ==
Muhammad was born in 1910 in Sanaa in a middle-class family and grew up as an orphan. He received his basic education at Sanaa religious schools and in 1939 he moved to Cairo to continue his higher education at Cairo University. He returned to Sanaa in 1941, but was imprisoned by Imam Yahya for his criticism of the Imamate. He was released a year later and moved to Taiz and then to Aden, where he established the "Free Yemeni Party" (also translated as the "Liberal Party") in 1944.

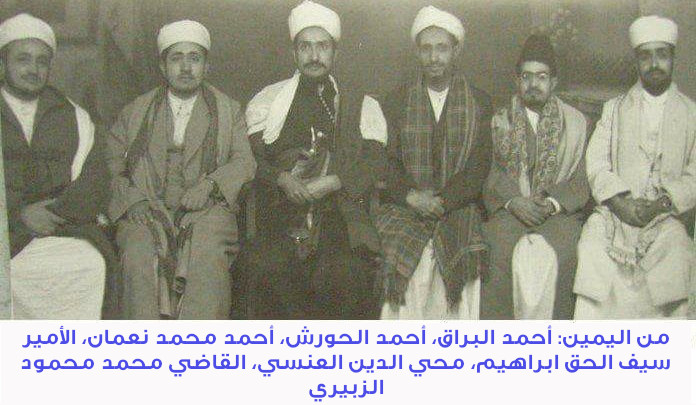
Von rechts, Ahmad al-Barāq, Ahmed al-Hoursch, Aḥmad Muḥammad Nuʿmān, Prinz Saif al-Haq Ibrahim, Muhyiddin al-Ansi, Muhammad Mahmoud al-Zubayri.

Following the Dustor or Constitutional Revolution in 1948, which led to the death of Imam Yahya and the short-lived establishment of a new government, Muhammad returned to Sanaa and was appointed as Minister of Knowledge. However, the revolution failed weeks later as Imam Yahya's son Ahmad restored the monarchy, and Al-Zubairi had to leave Sanaa to Aden again, and then to Pakistan. When the 26 September Revolution erupted against Imam Ahmed in 1962, he returned to Yemen and became Minister of Education. He was later appointed as Deputy Prime Minister and a member of the Revolutionary Council until he quit in 1964. On 1 April 1965 he was assassinated in Barat northern Sana'a.

== Bibliography ==
=== Non-fiction ===
- The Imamate and Its Danger to the Unity of Yemen
- The Great Trick in Arab Politics

=== Famous poetry collections ===
- Poetry Revolution, 1963
- Prayer in Hell, 1960
- Diwan Al-Zubairi, 1978

=== Novels ===
- Ma'asat Waq Alwaq,1985
