= Abdullah al-Wazir =

Abdullah Al-Wazir
- عبدالله الوزير
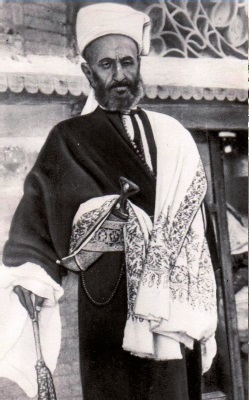
- Al-Wazir after proclaiming himself as the Imam of Yemen, 1948

Imam of Yemen
- In office February 17, 1948 – March 13, 1948
- Preceded by: Yahya Muhammad Hamid ed-Din
- Succeeded by: Ahmad bin Yahya

Personal details
- Born: 1885 Bayt al-Sayyid, Bani Hushaysh, Yemen vilayet
- Died: April 8, 1948 (aged 62–63)

Military service
- Allegiance: Kingdom of Yemen
- Battles/wars: Al-Waziri coup

Abdullah bin Ahmed Al-Wazir (Arabic: عبدالله بن أحمد الوزير, 1885 - 8 April 1948) was a Yemeni coup leader and Islamic scholar. He declared himself Imam during the Al-Waziri coup. In the 1920s, he served as the commander of the Yemeni army and held the governorships of Dhamar and Al Hudaydah in the 1930s. He was executed by beheading on April 8, 1948.

== Biography ==
He was born in the village of Bayt al-Sayyid, Bani Hushaysh in 1885. After his studies, he went to Sana'a and received religious education as a student of the scholar Ali Hussein Sahnub. In 1934, he represented Imam Yahya while signing the Treaty of Taif with King Abdulaziz.

=== Al-Waziri Coup ===
The al-Waziri clan aimed to take power from the ruling dynasty. On February 17, 1948, tribesmen ambushed Imam Yahya's car near Sanaa, killing him, his grandson, and two soldiers; 50 bullets were found in the imam's body. The attack was led by Ali Nasser Al-Qardai from the Murad tribe, who had been imprisoned by the imam. The al-Waziris then appointed al-Wazir as their imam, but his rule lasted only a few weeks.

After Yahya's assassination, his son, Ahmad bin Yahya, traveled through North Yemen to rally support and eventually became the new Imam of Yemen. He regained control of Sanaa with the help of tribesmen, but this led to the Sack of Sanaa, which lasted seven days and involved around 250,000 participants. Ahmad then deposed and executed Abdullah al-Wazir by beheading on 8 April 1948.
