= Ali Nasser Al-Qardai =

Yemeni poet and tribal leader (1885–1948)

- علي ناصر القردعي
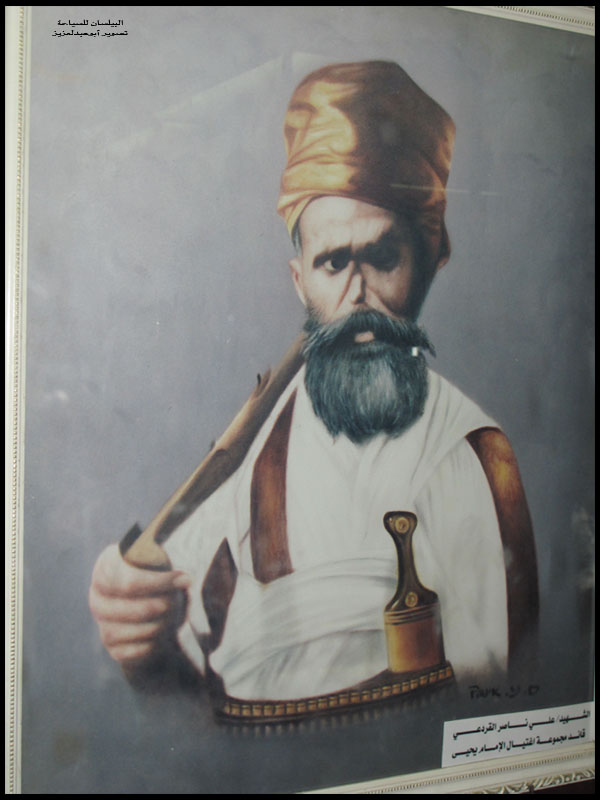
- Born: 1885; Rahabah, Yemen Vilayet, Ottoman Empire
- Died: 1948 (aged 62–63); Sanaa, North Yemen
- Occupation(s): Poet, revolutionary and tribal leader
- Known for: Assassination of Imam Yahya
- Title: Chief of Murad Tribes
- Movement: Free Yemeni Movement

Ali Nasser Al-Qardai (Arabic: علي ناصر القردعي, 1885–1948) was a Yemeni poet, revolutionary and tribal leader. He is best known for his assassination of the then ruling king of Yemen, Imam Yahya, during the Alwaziri coup.

== Biography ==
Ali was born in 1885 in Al-Rahaba district, Marib Governorate (then under Ottoman rule). He received no formal education. Instead, he hired a private teacher. In 1925, he succeeded his father as chief of Murad tribes. Al-Qardai opposed Imam Yahya and criticized his rule using poetry. After Imam failed to buy his loyalty and influence his tribes, he sent a military campaign to arrest him in 1929. Tribes led by Ali resisted the campaign, but he and his brother Ahmed were imprisoned two years later. His brother was sentenced to death, and he was imprisoned until he escaped in 1936.

In 1940, he joined the Free Yemeni Movement that planned the Alwaziri coup. He was tasked with assassinating Imam Yahya. On 17 February 1948, Al-Qardai shot and killed the Imam in an ambush outside of Sana'a. The coup failed and was quelled by the son of Imam Yahya, Ahmed bin Yahya. Al-Qardai was arrested in Khawlan. He was beheaded and his head was hung for two months at the gate of Sana'a.
