= 1948 War (disambiguation) =

1948 War usually refers to the 1948 Palestine war, which had two phases:

- 1947–48 Civil War in Mandatory Palestine, period of civil war between Arab forces and Jewish forces
- 1948 Arab–Israeli War, period of war between a coalition of Arab states, Palestinian Arab forces and the state of Israel

It may also refer to:

- Alwaziri coup, a violent civil war in Yemen
- Costa Rican Civil War, civil war between government and rebels
