= Royal Salute =

Royal Salute may refer to:

- honors music for royalty
  - "Aash Al Maleek", the national anthem of Saudi Arabia
  - "As-salam al-malaki al-urdoni", the national anthem of Jordan
  - "Royal Salute" (Yemen), the national anthem of the Mutawakkilite Kingdom of Yemen
  - "As-Salam al-Malaki", the national anthem of Iraq from 1932 to 1958
  - “Salām-e Shāh”, royal and national anthem of the Qajar dynasty, Persia (1873–1909)
- 21-gun salute in the Commonwealth
- Track #13 on The Format (album), 2006 rap album by AZ
- Royal Salute (whisky), a scotch produced by Chivas Brothers
