= Ahmad Muhammad Numan =

Yemeni politician (1909–1996)

- أحمد محمد نعمان
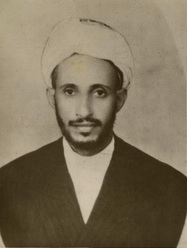
- Noman 1946

7th Prime Minister of Yemen Arab Republic
- In office 1965–1965
- Preceded by: Hassan al-Amri
- Succeeded by: Abdullah al-Sallal

18th Prime Minister of Yemen Arab Republic
- In office 1971–1971
- Preceded by: Abdul Salam Sabrah
- Succeeded by: Hassan al-Amri

Personal details
- Born: 26 April 1909 Dhu Lukian, Dhubhan, Taiz, Yemen Vilayet
- Died: 27 September 1996 (aged 87) Geneva, Switzerland

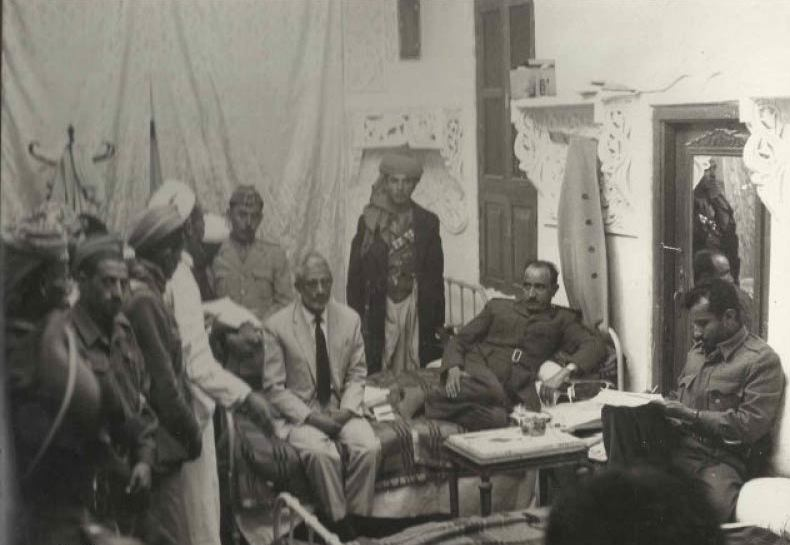
Abdullah al-Sallal and Ahmad Muhammad Numan 1962

Ahmad Muhammad Numan (Arabic: أحمد محمد نعمان; 26 April 1909 – 27 September 1996) was a Yemeni educator, propagandist and politician. He was one of the main progenitors of modern Yemeni nationalism. Numan was the founder of the Free Yemeni Movement and a propagandist in Cairo for the Yemeni Unionists, and served once as foreign minister and twice as prime minister of the Yemen Arab Republic.

== Family and youth ==
Numan was a descendant of a family of important shaykhs in al-Hujariyya, a province in the southern highlands southeast of the department of Taiz. Numan's uncle, Abd al-Wahhab Numan, was the Ottoman-appointed hakim (governor) of the region. The Numans were Sunni, specifically Shafi'i. Numan's father was a farmer.

Numan was educated in the traditional Islamic kuttab elementary school. He spent seven years at the university of Zabid. After his father's death in 1934, Numan assumed the role of head of household, in which capacity he gained the respect of fellow villagers and came into contact with local officials.

== Career as educator ==
In the mid-1930s, Numan met Mohammad Ahmad Haydara, who had studied abroad and had been exposed to subjects beyond Numan's limited Islamic education. The two began a school in Dubhan, al-Madrassa al-Ahliyya, specifically for young teenage boys. The school became famous for teaching geography, arithmetic and modern sciences. The school also soon became a local center for the discussion of current events. Much of the material came from books and newspapers supplied by Numan's brother Ali, who worked in Aden. The regulars who attended the discussions came to be known as Nadi a-Islah (the "Reform Group"). Unlike reform-minded intellectuals in the capital of Sanaa, the Dubhan group was made up of peasant farmers.

Numan's school attracted notice. In 1935, Ahmad al Muta, then an examination inspector for the Ministry of Education, met Numan. Al-Muta was an outspoken advocate for reform, for which he was removed from the Army and as editor of the Imam's official newspaper. After the Imam's defeat in the border war with Saudi Arabia al-Muta had formed the secret Hay'at al Nidal (the Committee of the Struggle") to resist a conservative backlash. Al-Muta tried to attach Numan's groups to that organization.

In 1936 the Imam dispatched his son Sayf al-Islam Qasim to visit the school. Accompanying him were the Governor of Taiz Sayyid Ali al-Wazir and the poet Muhammad al-Zubayri. The report must have pleased the Imam inasmuch as he recommended it to an Egyptian education delegation. Complaints from conservatives, however, led to the appointment of a traditional instructor to teach Zaidi doctrines. And when the Imam's secret police discovered the Hay'at al Nidal and arrested al-Muta, Numan was placed under house arrest in Taiz.

== Activities in Cairo ==
On release from arrest, Numan travelled to Cairo. He later said that while under arrest he developed his ambition to be a political leader. He left Dhjubhan in 1937 and travelled to Cairo by way of Lahej and Aden. Numan's original goal was to attend King Fuad I University but was refused admission because he lacked qualifications in modern subjects. Instead Numan reluctantly attended al-Azhar University, which he feared would simply duplicate the Islamic education he received at Zabid. Instead, he encountered modern Arab political thought. The university was a center of Muslim Brotherhood activity, who were particularly interested in Yemen, owing to its isolation, as a suitable test for governance according to shari'a. At al-Azhar Numan made the acquaintance of Ali al-Tahir, a Palestinian newspaper publisher in Cairo. It was through al-Tahir that Numan met Shakib Arslan.

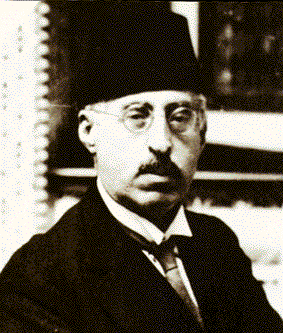
Shakib Arslan

Arslan soon took Numan under his wing. Arslan's interest in the Yemen went back to his attempted mediation of the Saudi-Yemen war of 1934. At the time he was shocked by the backwardness of Yemen, and persuaded the Imam to employ advisers (from the same Lebanese Druze community that he came from. For similar reasons he hired Numan as his secretary in 1939.

While working for Arslan and writing for al-'Alam, Numan also wrote pamphlets. His first contribution was an introduction to The Journey of H.H. Prince Sayf al-Islam the Great Crown Prince of Yemen by Sayyid Husayn al-Yamani in 1937. He also wrote two pamphlets mainly about his treatment by Sayyid Ali al-Wazir, the governor of Taiz: The First Moan (1948) and A Few Words on the Outrages of Ali al-Wazir (1939), both of which also criticized the government of Yemen in general.

In March 1940 the poet Muhammad al-Zubayri arrived in Cairo. Although al-Zubayri's patron was Ali al-Wazir, the former governor of Taiz against whom Numan's pamphlets were directed, al-Zubayri sought out Numan (whom he had once before met when he accompanied Ahmad al Muta to inspect Numan's school). Although the poet had no background in reform politics or anti-imamic agitation and spent his first few months in Cairo writing poetry and reading at Dar al-Ulum University, he was gradually drawn into the orb of Yemeni dissidents. In mid-1940 al-Zubayri and Numan formed al-Katiba al-Ula (the "First Battalion"), a discussion group focusing on plans for reform of Yemen. The members contributed articles to the Cairo press.

In 1941 Arslan decided to return to Switzerland and invited Numan to join him. But Numan's travel documents were not in order, and he decided to return to Aden instead.

== Numan among the shabab ==
When Numan returned to Yemen at the end of February 1941, Crown Prince Ahmad bin Yahya, whom his father the Imam appointed Governor of Taiz in place of Ali al-Wazir, appointed him inspector of the province's primary schools. Numan remained in contact with al-Zubayri, who continued the meetings of al-Katiba, changing its name, however, to Shabab al-Amr, based on the title of the reform manifesto he was writing: al-Barnamij al-Awwal min Baramij Shabab al-Amr bi'l-Ma'ruf wa 'l-Nahi 'an al-Mankur ("The First Programme of the Youths for Promoting the Good and Preventing the Bad"), a title based on the Quranic expression suggesting government by the ummah. In August al-Zubayri arrived in Taiz with his Programme and would later be joined by other of the shabab from Cairo. Before his arrival al-Zubayri had consulted with Ahmad al Muta and several associates in Sanaa and had written to Numan of his plan to present the Barnamij to the Imam. Numan counsel him against doing so on the ground that public support had not been sufficiently organized to risk a confrontation with the Imam.

Disregarding Numan's advice, al-Zubayri proceeded with his plan. The Imam exploded with rage and charged him with "offence against Islam." He set up a board to try al-Zubaryi, which included the unnamah, including Zayd al-Daylami of the Sanaa appeal court and notables such as former Governor of Taiz Ali al-Wazir and his son Abdullah al-Wazir (whom he suspected of using al-Zubayri to promote their own ambitions for the imamate). During the trial persons associated with the Shabab al-Amr distributed hand-written pamphlets supporting al-Zubayri. The Imam cracked down on the protests and ordered two waves of imprisonments in December 1941 and January 1942. The Board acquitted al-Zubayri in defiance of the Imam. The protestors were left in jail, however. Most were released in April 1942, but al-Zubayri was not freed until September 1942.

== Offices in the Yemen Arab Republic ==
Numan's first term as prime minister was under President Abdullah al-Sallal. Numan served for less than three months, from 20 April to 6 July 1965. His second term was under President Abdul Rahman al-Iryani, this time lasting less than four months, from 3 May to 24 August 1971.

Numan withdrew from politics completely when his son Muhammad Ahmad Numan was assassinated. He spent the rest of his life in Saudi Arabia and Cairo.

Political offices
Preceded by Hassan al-Amri	Prime Minister of Yemen Arab Republic; 1965	Succeeded by Abdullah as-Sallal
Preceded by Abdul Salam Sabrah (acting)	Prime Minister of Yemen Arab Republic; 1971	Succeeded by Hassan al-Amri
