= Fodil El Ouratilani =

Algerian Muslim Brotherhood member

- Born: June 2, 1900; Beni Ourtilane, Algeria
- Died: March 12, 1959 (aged 58); Ankara, Turkey
- Education: Al Azhar University
- Occupation: Religious reformer

Fodil El Ouratilani (Arabic: الفضيل الورتيلاني) was an Algerian Muslim Brotherhood member. He is considered a prominent member of the Islamic Movement in Algeria, for he had an important role in founding the Association of Algerian Muslim Ulema in 1931, as he was very close to Imam Abdelhamid Ben Badis and Imam Bashir Al-Ibrahimi. He also contributed greatly to the empowerment of the principles of the Association in Algeria and then in France beside Algerian workers there.

He was the strong link between the Muslim Brotherhood ideology and Association of Algerian Muslim Ulema. El Ouratilani joined the Muslim Brotherhood when he settled in Egypt and became very close to and trusted by the martyr Imam Hassan Al-Banna, for he filled in for his Tuesday lessons and was tasked with the Yemeni file as well as opening some community associations in Egypt. Some of his articles were collected in a book titled Algeria: Rebellion & Revolution.

== Early life ==
Ibrahim Bin Mustafa El Djazairi, who is also known as Fodil El Ouratilani, was born on June 2, 1900, in Beni Ourtilane, a town in Setif Province in eastern Algeria. He was associated with the town and it is how he became known as El Ouratilani. He grew up in a family of scholars, as his grandfather, Sheikh Al-Hossein El Ouratilani, an explorer who known for his famous journey, was a renowned scholar in his town and in Algeria.

Like other students, he memorized the Qur’an and learned reading and writing principles. He also studied Arabic linguistics under the scholars of his town. He then moved to Constantine in 1928, where he continued his studies under Sheikh Abdelhamid Ben Badis. In Bin Badis’ school, he received his education of tafsir, hadith, Islamic history, and Arabic literature, and he was influenced by his great reformer Sheikh and the way he brought about reform. In only a year, El Ouratilani was capable of becoming his teaching assistant, a writer for both Al-Basaer and Al-Shihab journals, and a companion of Ben Badis’ on some of his journeys.

== Reform activity ==
Abdelhamid Ben Badis did not limit his advocacy for reform to Algerians in the country, he extended his vision to Algerian expatriates in France. He believed that one of the most important duties of the association is to protect Muslims from losing their Islam and to take a role in educating the young before they get consumed by the French life. He looked around and could not find anyone more qualified than Fodil El Ouratilani to take on this challenging mission, which requires dedication, faith in the cause, and a need for reform.

El Ouratilani went to France in 1963 on behalf of the association, he stayed in Paris, and he was highly motivated to start his activity. He got in touch with Algerian workers and students in France and started establishing clubs to teach the Arabic language and principles of Islam, and combat sins around Muslims living in France. Within two years, he was able to open many cultural clubs in Paris, its environs, and some other French cities.

El Ouratilani used the opportunity of being in Paris to call Arab students in French universities and he bonded with them. For example, Muhammed Abdallah Draz, author of the book Morality in the Quran, and Sheikh Abdelrahman Taj, who became a Sheikh for Al-Azhar, as well as, Syrian luminaire Mohamed Al-Mubarak, and poet Omar Bahauddin Al-Amiri.

This activity worried the French authorities his movement was closely watched, and he received death threats. Therefore, he was forced to leave France for Italy and from there to Cairo.

His destination in 1940 was Cairo, where he joined Al-Azhar and received his degree at the Faculty of Religion and Islamic Law. He continued his national jihad to expose French colonialism in Algeria and to serve the Algerian cause and Muslim causes in general. Therefore, for instance, in 1948, he founded the Committee for Defense. And in 1952, he also established the North African Defense Front, then the Ulema of Al-Azhar in 1948, where he received Sheikh Mohamed Al-Bashir Al-Ibrahimi in 1952. He took a part in organizing the movement of the Muslim Brotherhood and had a strong bond with Hassan Al-Banna because of his great speeches and persuasion skills. In appreciation of El Ouratilani, when he was away from Cairo, Al-Banna would give the Tuesday speech in the meeting held in the Brotherhood center.

El Ouratilani’s activities extended to supporting the free people of Yemen, as there was a strong opposition movement and a need for reform. Al-Banna was aware of what was happening in Yemen, and looking to bring the country out of isolation, poverty, and ignorance, he sent Fodil El Ouratilani.

Fodil El Ouratilani went to Yemen in 1947 and succeeded in uniting the opposition and eliminate their differences and began preparing people for change with his passionate speeches that evoke emotions and stoke enthusiasm.

In February 1948, the opposition succeeded in taking power after defeating Imam Yahya and El Ouratilani was accused of participating in a coup d'état. He was arrested there and released along with those who had received an amnesty, which Al-Ibrahimi had ridiculed in an article published in Al-Basaer, where he exposed the corrupt system. El Ouratilani left Yemen and moved between several European countries, as Arab countries initially refused to have him, until Lebanon agreed to receive him, provided that it is kept a secret.

Furthermore, after the military movement overthrown King Farouk, El Ouratilani returned to Egypt after several years of absence and was well-received by scientists and politicians. In view of his honorable past of jihad, El Ouratilani returned to jihad, supporting the Algerian Revolution that started in his country in 1954 and issuing a statement with the great mujahid Sheikh Mohamed Al-Bashir Al-Ibrahimi, leader of the Association of Algerian Muslim Ulema. He participated in founding the National Liberation Front in 1955, which is composed of Sheikh Al-Ibrahimi, representatives of the Liberation Front such as Ahmed Ben Bella, Hocine Aït Ahmed, and representatives of Algerian parties. El Ouratilani did not stay for long in Cairo, he left it for Beirut in 1955.

El Ouratilani, like other people who give Dawah, was the type of person that would neglect themselves for the sake of major issues, and perhaps night and day passed with him completely occupied with work, without feeding himself. This led to an imbalance in his health and caused him to have serious illnesses, but that did not stop him from working for the sake of advocacy. He died in a hospital in Ankara on March 12, 1959. In 1987, and after years of refusal, his body was transferred from Turkey and reburied in his hometown in Algeria.

Sheikh Mohamed Al-Bashir Al-Ibrahimi said about him,

“Fodil El Ouratilani was one of this great Algerian renaissance blessings. He worked hard in the fields of jihad in Algeria then moved to Egypt and roamed all around the East in journeys that made Algeria heard and truly made him an Algerian leader and a prominent figure with a prominent position among all the men of the East. A great deal of Algerian men who were envious of the success El Ouratilani had achieved in political circles in the East. Therefore, they spoke badly of him, accused him of things to get back at him and the Association of Algerian Muslim Ulema by slandering and belittling one of its scholars.”

== Connections ==
He had close connections with Algerian Muslims living in France and Arab studying there, such as Sheikh Muhammed Abdallah Draz, Sheikh Abdelrahman Taj, Mohamed Al-Mubarak and Omar Bahauddin Al-Amiri. This Islamic activity raised the suspicion of French authorities and racist, terrorist organizations that started to restrict the movement of Muslim activists, primarily Fodil El Ouratilani. La Main Rouge (English: The Red Hand), for instance, a terrorist organization, decided to assassinate him, forcing him to leave France for Italy with the help of Prince Shakib Arslan, who provided him with a passport. He went to Egypt in 1939 and there found the best environment for starting Islamic activity, since his Sheikh, Ben Badis, preceded him in visiting Egypt a quarter of a century ago, where he met some of its scholars, such as Sheikh Muhammad Bakhit Al-Muti'I, the Grand Mufti of Egypt at the time, and Sheikh Abu Al-Fadl Al-Gizawi, who later became the Sheikh of Al-Azhar.

The martyr Imam Hassan Al-Banna was highly impressed with Sheikh Abdelhamid Ben Badis and his Islamic jihad, as he started an intellectual journal called Al-Shihab after the Algerian Al-Shihab journal. This spiritual connection between the two Islamic movements, the Muslim Brotherhood in Egypt, and the Association of Algerian Muslim Ulema In Algeria, made it easy for Fodil El Ouratilani to connect with and join the Muslim Brotherhood becoming a prominent member. Fodil El Ouratilani gave the Tuesday speech in the Muslim Brotherhood center on behalf of Hassan Al-Banna, the general guide of the Brotherhood.

== Activity and jihad ==
When in Egypt, Fodil El Ouratilani participated in establishing many charity and political associations, such as the Committee for Defense, the Algerian Community Association in 1942, and the North African Defense Front in 1944, where he was the secretary-general. Sheikh Mohammed Al-Khadar Hussein, the grandson of Emir Abdelkader El Djazairi, and Abdelkrim El-Khattabi are some of the members of these associations.

Fodil El Ouratilani played a prominent role in organizing the Free Yemeni Movement in 1948.

Fodil El Ouratilani performed jihad and worked to free people from being enslaved and forced to worship others, encouraging them to worship Allah.

Although Fodil El Ouratilani was Algerian, his movements and jihad were not only for Algeria but for all Muslims, because his goal was to perform jihad for the sake of Allah.

When the Algerian Revolution began on November 1, 1994, El Ouratilani published an article on November 3, 1994, titled “To Algerian Revolutionaries: Today it is Life or Death”. And on November 15, 1994, he issued a statement with Sheikh Bashir Al-Ibrahimi. On March 17, 1955, he co-founded the National Liberation Front, which is composed of Sheikh Mohamed Al-Bashir Al-Ibrahimi and representatives of the National Liberation Front, Ahmed Ben Bella, Hocine Aït Ahmed, Mohamed Khider and some representatives of Algerian parties, such as Ash-Shadhili Makki, Hussein Lahaul, Abdulrahman Kiwan and others.

== Role in Yemen ==
He played a role in the organization of the Free Yemeni Movement, which took place in February 1948 against Imam Yahya Hamidaddin. Some scholars have referred to this role as Mustafa Shakʻah in An Egyptian’s Adventures in Yemen (original: Mughāmarāt miṣrī fī majāhil al-Yaman), Hamid Shahra in The Murder of a Smile (original: Mṣrʿ ālībtsāmā) Ahmad Al-Shami in his book Wind of Change in Yemen. He was also ignored by many European historians specializing in Arab and Islamic affairs. Ahmad Al-Shami, one of the participants in this revolution, said that Algerian scholar and mujahid Fodil El Ouratilani is the one who changed the course of history of Yemen in the 20th century and that when he set foot in Yemen, he brought reform because the Alwaziri coup in 1948 was his doing. He went to Yemen for the first time in 1947, and in his journey, he met scholars and youth, gave speeches in mosques and public places, and was able to convince Yemenis to unite and of the need for change to battle ignorance and underdevelopment. Two months later, he returned to Egypt where Yemeni elites and opposition groups are to write a new constitution, or what is called the Sacred Charter. He went back to Yemen to present the charter for scholars and politicians there to get their opinions and suggestions. The final version of the charter was done in November 1947, all parties agreed on installing Abdullah Al-Wazir as a king, and a successor to Imam Yahya Hamidaddin.

Imam Ahmad Yahya Hamidaddin opposed the constitutional government in Sana'a and accused it of assassinating his father and insulting his sisters, so he gathered his loyal tribes and together they fought against the constitutional government. Constitutional order was overthrown on March 13, 1948, and Imam Ahmad became king. After the defeat of the Yemeni Revolution, El Ouratilani was sentenced to death. He was accused of taking part in the assassination of Imam Yahya and the coup d'état. He was wanted for death, therefore he spent five years in disguise, homeless, and had to change his facial features. And that is why there are pictures of him in an Azhari scholar outfit, a tribe sheikh, and an American actor. During this period, he secretly visited all Western European countries and met with the leader of the Association of Algerian Muslim Ulema, Sheikh Mohamed Al-Bashir Al-Ibrahimi, and his deputy, Sheikh Muhammad Al-Arabi Al-Tibsi in Switzerland. Prime Minister of Lebanon, Riad Al-Solh accepted that El Ouratilani resides in Beirut, provided that it was kept a secret.

== Connection with the Muslim Brotherhood ==
In his book, The Muslim Brotherhood: Events that Made History, Great scholar Mahmoud Abdelhalim says about him,

“Algerian Fodil El Ouratilani was one of the mujahideen leaders who were chased by French colonizers, he fled to Egypt and got in touch with the Muslim Brotherhood. He frequented the center of the Muslim Brotherhood going there nearly every day, as it is the centre of liberation movements against colonialism in every Islamic country. He was intelligent, very knowledgeable, and well-connected, and his actions were not limited for his home country, Algeria, he saw the Islamic world as an indivisible unit and that he was required to free each and every part of it. I believe he was the first person to travel to Yemen, where Imam Yahya was toppled.”

== Threat ==
During his jihad, El Ouratilani was exposed to many dangers. His blood was wasted on the French, and he was captured more than once. Imam Hassan Al-Banna had a role in releasing him and his companion Amin Ismail after the events in Yemen in 1948.

After the failure of the Free Yemeni Movement, Fodil El Ouratilani, was sentenced to death and became wanted. He stayed in disguise for five years roaming European countries and met leader of the Association of Algerian Muslim Ulema, Sheikh Mohamed Al-Bashir Al-Ibrahimi, and his deputy, Sheikh Muhammad Al-Arabi Al-Tibsi in Switzerland.

Prime Minister of Lebanon, Riad Al-Solh, accepted that El Ouratilani resides in Beirut, provided that it was kept a secret.

== Leaving for Lebanon ==
After taking power, putting President Mohamed Naguib under house arrest, arresting Muslim Brotherhood members, and executing six of their leaders, Abdel Nasser was attacked by El Ouratilani. After he returned to Cairo, as this happened in Haj season, El Ouratilani and his colleague Ash-Shadhili Makki were detained in a military prison. El Ouratilani left Cairo in 1995 for Beirut after he was certain Egyptian intelligence were plotting against him and his mentor Imam Bashir Al-Ibrahimi.

== Death ==
He died from an illness in a hospital in Turkey on March 12, 1959.

In 1987, after years of his death, he was transferred from Turkey to be reburied in him hometown.

In 1980, a mosque under his name was inaugurated in Algeria in memory of him.
