= Muhammad Zubarah =

- Born: 1884; Sana'a, Yemen
- Died: 1961 (aged 76–77); Sana'a, Yemen
- Occupations: Muslim scholar, Historian

Muhammad bin Muhammad bin Yahya Zubarah al-San’ani (1301–1381 AH; 1884–1961 CE) was a Yemeni historian and religious scholar from Sana’a. He held official positions under Imam Yahya, he wrote on the history of flags of Yemen, and was the father of the former Mufti of Yemen Ahmed bin Muhammad Zubara.

He was the Prince of Al-Saeed Palace (a warehouse for ammunition and supplies for the Yemeni army), and his son Ahmed married Yahya's daughter, Princess Khadija. Yahya sent him on missions to neighboring countries, and to Egypt to print Yemeni books.

== Some of his works ==
- "Nil alwatar min tarajim rijal alyaman" in the thirteenth century from the migration of the master of mankind, may God's prayers and peace be upon him, Center for Yemeni Studies and Research, Sana’a.
- "Nubala' alyaman bialqarn althaani eashar lilhijrati" The Dissemination of Custom for the Nobles of Yemen after the Millennium, New Generation Library, Sana'a, 2012
- "Almulhaq altaabie lilbadr altaalae bimahasin" after the seventh century, Dar Al-Maarifa, Beirut
- "Khulasat almutun fi 'anba' wanubala' alyaman", Center for Islamic Heritage and Research, Sana’a
- "Atihaf almuhtadiyn fi aleutrat alnbwyt" and the Translation of 120 Imams from it.
- "Nushir aleurf linubala' alyaman baed al'alif".
- "lamiat nubala' alyaman" who died in the fourteenth century AH.
