= Fodil =

Fodil is a given name. Notable people with the name include:

- Fodil El Ouratilani (1900–1959), Algerian Muslim Brotherhood member
- Fodil Hadjadj (born 1983), Algerian footballer
- Fodil Goumrassa (1952–2023), Algerian judoka
- Fodil Megharia (born 1961), Algerian footballer
- Fodil Mezali (born 1959), Algerian journalist

== See also ==
- Abassia Fodil (1918–1962), Algerian trade unionist
