= Hermann Burchardt =

German traveler and photographer killed in Yemen

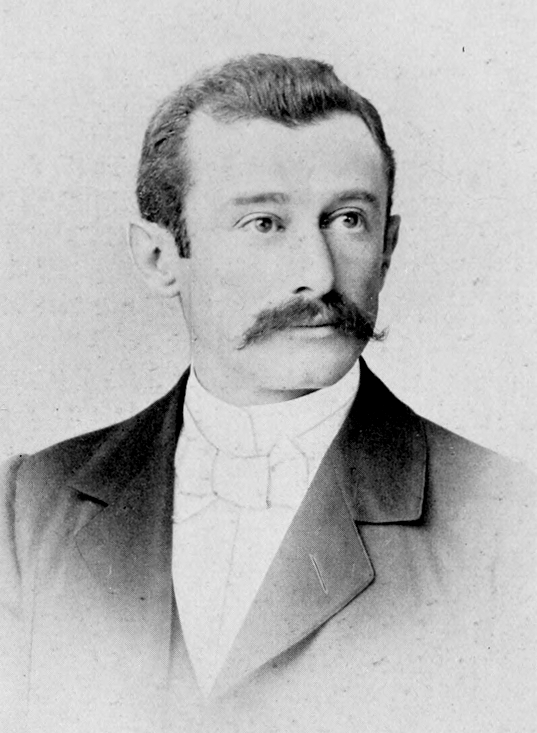
Hermann Burchardt (1857–1909)

Hermann Burchardt (November 18, 1857 – December 19, 1909) was a German explorer and photographer of Jewish descent, who is renowned for his black and white pictorial essays of scenes in Arabia in the early 20th century.

== Life and career ==
Burchardt, born in Berlin in 1857 to a Jewish family, gave up his unwanted merchant profession at the age of 30, following the death of his father who left him with a large inheritance. Around this time, Burchardt who had developed a keen interest in photography, chose to become a privateer - that is, a man who travelled for pleasure. Before disembarking on his journeys to Africa and the Middle East, he learnt systematically both Arabic and Turkish while studying in Berlin's Department of Oriental Languages (Seminar für Orientalische Sprachen) between the years 1890–1892, and also the rudiments of Swahili and Persian (Farsi). Burchardt's first trip in the Spring of 1893 brought him to the Siwa Oasis in Egypt. Later he settled in Damascus for a few years, using the city as his base for disembarking on his more extended travels. In his travels throughout the Muslim world, he was usually accompanied by his Syrian Arab guide and confidant, Abu Ibrahim.

The beginning of his journeys took him to Tangier, in Morocco, and from there to Samarkand in Central Asia. Eventually, his tours would lead him to East Africa and, particularly, to the southern part of the Arabian Peninsula. On these trips he was furnished with his own complete, state-of-the-art photographic equipment, enabling him to take photographs of peoples and the places he visited. He had also taken along with him the necessary tools for developing the plates and for the production of prints. As an avid traveler Burchardt had photographed extensively not only in the Arabic Middle East (e.g. archaeological sites in Hauran of Syria, etc.) and North Africa (including Morocco), but also in Turkey and Persia, and Australia.

In February 1906, Burchardt returned to Germany where he gave a lecture at the General Assembly of the Berlin Society for Geography. Burchardt used the home of Gustav Sachs in Moabit, Berlin, as his home base whenever he returned to Germany.

== Death ==
Burchardt first arrived in Sana'a, Yemen in 1901, where he spent almost one year with the Jewish community. On the third of these extensive travels, in December 1909 he made arrangements to join-up with the Italian vice-consul Marquis Benzoni in Mocha, and to escort him on his journey to Sana'a via Taiz and al-ʿUdayn. In Burchardt's last missive sent by postcard from Mocha and dated 8 December 1909, he wrote: "This card will reach you from one of the most godforsaken little places in Asia. It exceeds all my expectations, with regard to the destruction. It looks like a city entirely destroyed by earthquakes. The path from Taiz to here, which takes 3 days, was or should have been insecure. There were the usual disorders with the tax collectors, with whom there were deaths on both sides. Here lives the Italian consulate, and the consul will go back with me to Sanaa. Photos from here will be very interesting. The last stage in the plain is terribly hot; bad water; quinine is given to all my people (11 people in number, including 8 Gendarmerie). Will be glad to once again reach the high plateau of Arabia Felix." While their small caravan was en route to Sana'a, when they had come within three to four days' walking distance from Sana'a, and had just crossed the riverine gulch, Wādī ad-Door (Arabic: وادي الدور), to the west of Ibb, they were ambushed and killed by gunmen, in what some say was a case of mistaken identity.

In Sana'a and the port city of Hodeida the news aroused general mourning among the European colony. The consulate's flag flew half-mast. The Christmas celebrations were canceled. The Italian merchant, Caprotti, who was a resident of Sana'a and a friend of Burchardt's since his first visit to Yemen, closed his epistolary communication of 23 December 1909 from Hodeida to the relatives of Burchardt with these words (in French): "Our poor, unfortunate friend was, by all who knew him, sincerely loved. The poor of Sana'a certainly weep over his tragic death. God will remember his kindness and charity. I know very well what he had done to comfort the poor."

== Legacy ==
Most of Burchardt's photographs have now been dated and their geographical location determined. A small but exquisite part of the collection has now been masterfully edited and commented in a volume with texts in both English and German. The work covers Burchardt's journey over the period of December, 1903 to March, 1904, when he traveled from Basra to Kuwait and on to Bahrain, Hofuf, Qatar, Abu Dhabi, Dubai, Muscat in Oman, and finally Persia. This leg of the photographer's journey has been described in only one publication, namely, the minutes of a lecture in the "Journal of the Geographical Society." Of particular interest is Burchardt's travels to Yemen where he photographed the Jewish communities in Sana'a, in Radāʻ, in Maswār and in Rouda. Particularly where Yemenite Jewry is concerned, a visually-based ethnography also preserves facts that are forgotten in oral traditions and are not mentioned in written sources. Hermann Burchardt visited Yemen in 1902, 1907, and again in 1909, the year in which he was killed in Yemen.

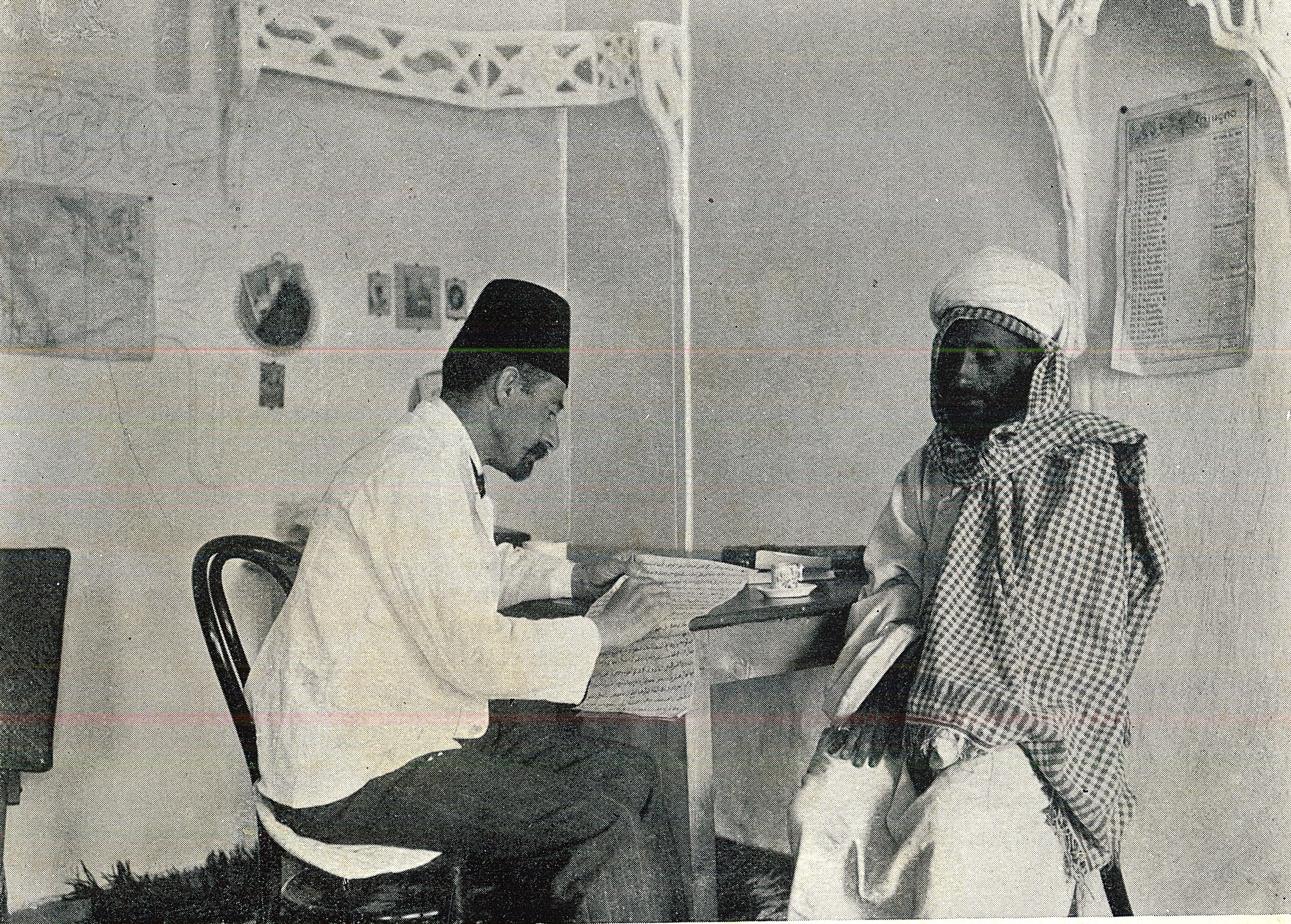
Hermann Burchardt (left) with his Yemeni secretary, Aḥmed Muḥammad el-Ǧarādī (ca. 1909)

=== Personal effects ===
After his death, Burchardt's nephew, Max Ginsberg, donated in 1911 more than 500 photographic plates and contact sheets of the traveler (taken from the estate of Hermann Burchardt) to the Berlin Museum of Ethnology (Museum für Völkerkunde), today, the Ethnological Museum of Berlin, for a total of nearly 2000 negatives, glass and celluloid plates, where they lay dormant and forgotten in their boxes, until after the year 2000, at which time, with support from the German Research Foundation, they were scientifically analyzed and published.

Burchardt kept a diary of his travels, but for many years it was thought that his diary was lost. Burchardt's private notes in his diary were necessary to identify many of his photographs, without which it would have been nearly impossible. In a search for the estate of Eugen Mittwoch, who evaluated Burchardt's papers on Yemen as late as the 1920s, part of Burchardt's estate came to light in the National Archive in Jerusalem. In these boxes were diaries, letters and lists with picture titles. At the end of processing of the photographic estate, about 90% of the almost 2,000 pictures could be identified and dated.

The results of this work were partly issued in Yemen and the Arab States of the Gulf Coast and reviewed there with great interest. The National Museum in Sana'a has a small permanent exhibition of black-and-white photographs of the German traveler, Hermann Burchardt.

Max Freiherr von Oppenheim made extensive use of Burchardt's photographic work which he published in his own studies of the Orient. The images that Burchardt was particularly fond of capturing were of harbors, ships, markets, merchants, Sheikhs and the Jews of Yemen.

Professor Eugen Mittwoch, based on the testimony of Burchardt's Yemeni-Arab secretary which he translated into German, wrote a book entitled, Aus dem Jemen (published in Leipzig in 1926), in which he describes Hermann Burchardt's final journey in South Arabia. At his funeral, Burchardt was eulogized by an Italian merchant who had befriended him on his last visit to Sana'a.

== Publications / Literature ==
During Burchardt's stays in Germany, he lectured at the Berlin Geographical Society. His lectures were partly published in the journal of the Society.

- Hermann Burchardt, Von den Juden des Jemen [Of the Jews of Yemen], Berlin 1913 (post-mortem)
- Hermann Burchardt, August Fischer (ed.): Arabische und persische Handschriften: Aus dem Besitz des verstorbenen Reisenden Dr. Burchardt. Privatdruck in der Buchhandlung Gustav Fock 1921. [Arab and Persian manuscripts: From the estate of the late Dr. Burchardt's travels]
- Eugen Mittwoch (Bearbeiter): Aus dem Jemen: Hermann Burchardts letzte Reise durch Südarabien. Festgabe für den 4. Deutschen Orientalistentag in Hamburg. Deutsche Morgenländische Gesellschaft, Brockhaus, Leipzig 1926. [From Yemen: Herman Burchardt's last trip through southern Arabia]
- Annegret Nippa: Lesen in alten Photographien aus Baalbek. Völkerkundemuseum der Universität Zürich, Zürich 1996 [Reading in Old Photographs -- from Baalbek. Photos of Hermann Burchardt], ISBN 3-909105-29-7.
- Annegret Nippa, Peter Herbstreuth (editors): Unterwegs am Golf: Von Basra nach Maskat. Verlag Schiler, Berlin, 2006, ISBN 3-89930-070-X. (deutsch, englisch)
- Franziska Bloch: Mit geschultem Blick. Hermann Burchardts Reise in Südsyrien 1895. Fotografien eines deutschen Orientreisenden. Katalogbroschüre zur gleichnamigen Ausstellung des Deutschen Archäologischen Instituts in Berlin, Außenstelle Damaskus, in Zusammenarbeit mit dem Ethnologischen Museum, Berlin 2010. (German/Arabic)
- Burchardt, Hermann, Die Juden im Yemen, in: Ost und West 2 (1902), Berlin [The Jews in Yemen, in: East and West 2 (1902)], pp. 337–341; sowie: ders., Reiseskizzen aus dem Yemen, in: Zeitschrift der Gesellschaft für Erdkunde 17 (1902), pp. 305–322.
- Burchardt, Hermann, Ost-Arabien. Von Basra bis Maskat auf Grund eigner Reisen, in: Zeitschrift der Gesellschaft für Erdkunde 21 (1906) [Eastern Arabia. From Basra to Muscat on basic own travel, in: Journal of the Geographical Society 21 (1906)], pp. 305–322.
- Arabische und Persische Handschriften [Arabic and Persian Manuscripts], Burchardt, Hermann. - [p. l.] : [s. n.]Leipzig ( : Otto Wigand), ([1921]), [Privatdr.] (published post-mortem)
- Unterwegs am Golf : von Basra nach Maskat = Along the Gulf : from Basra to Muscat / photographs by Hermann Burchardt; [edited by] Annegret Nippa, Peter Herbstreuth; [Englische Übersetzung, Mitch Cohen]. Berlin 2006

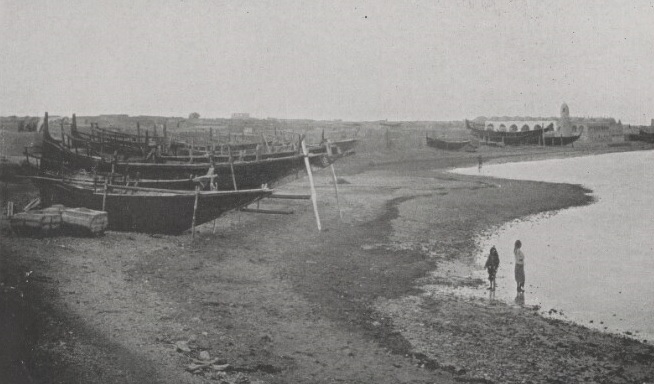
Doha in Qatar, photographed by Hermann Burchardt in 1904
