= Hizyaz =

Hizyaz حزيز
- Village
- Location in Yemen
- Coordinates: 15.22839°N 44.25338°E
- Country: Yemen
- Governorate: Sanaa
- District: Sanhan
- Elevation: 7,674 ft (2,339 m)
- Time zone: UTC+3 (Yemen Standard Time)

Hizyaz (Arabic: حزيز Ḥizyaz), also spelled Hezyaz, is a town in Yemen, on the far southern outskirts of the capital Sanaa. It is located in Sanhan District of Sanaa Governorate, at the southern end of the Sanaa plain. Hizyaz is the site of one of Sanaa's power stations, which as of 2020, due to the damages caused to Sanaa's energy infrastructure during the Yemeni Civil War, was the main remaining supplier of Sanaa's public electricital network.

== History ==
Hizyaz is an old town, mentioned in the 10th-century Sifat Jazirat al-Arab of Abu Muhammad al-Hasan al-Hamdani as well as several times in the Kitab al-Simt of Muhammad ibn Hatim al-Yami al-Hamdani (although the references there are "somewhat garbled"). It is mostly mentioned as a stage on the route south from Sanaa. Hizyaz was also the site of a minor battle in early April, 906 CE (294 AH): as the Ismai'ili general Ali ibn al-Fadl al-Jayshani approached Sanaa, the Yu'firid leader As'ad ibn Abi Yu'fir led a sortie against him in an attempt to stop his advance. The two forces met at Hizyaz, and Ali ibn al-Fadl's army emerged victorious and he entered Sanaa on the 17th of April. Hizyaz is also where the Imam of Yemen, Yahya Muhammad Hamid ed-Din, was assassinated in 1948, along with Abdullah ibn al-Husayn al-Amri.

== Energy ==
Hizyaz's power station, named the Hizyaz Central Generating Station (محطة توليد كهرباء حزيز المركزية) consists of three power plants. One, with a generating capacity of 30 megawatts, completed in 2002; another, with a capacity of 60 megawatts, was added in 2004, and an extension, with a capacity of 30 megawatts, was completed in 2007. The Hizyaz power station is also connected by a 132-kilovolt power line to the Bani Hushaysh substation, which brought power from the power plant in Ma'rib until that plant ceased operations in 2015.

As of 2020, due to the damages caused to Sanaa's energy infrastructure during the Yemeni Civil War, Hizyaz was the main remaining source of public electricity for the city, although it only operated at a generating capacity of 7 kilovolts.
