= Mohammad Ahmad Haydara =

Muhammad Ahmad Haydara
- محمد أحمد حيدرة
- Born: 1902 al-Duwaymat, Taiz Governorate, Ottoman Empire
- Died: 1973 (aged 70–71); Alexandria, Egypt
- Occupation: Teacher

Muhammad Ahmad Haydara (1902 – 1973; Arabic: محمد أحمد حيدرة, romanized: Mohammed Ahmad Haydarâ) was the first teacher of the enlightenment movement in the Mutawakkilite Kingdom of Yemen. He also wrote the lyrics for the Yemeni anthem, named Royal Salute.

Haydara was born in the village of al-Duwaymat, in the Ottoman Empire. His father, Ahmad Haydara, was a merchant. He received his education in Aden, which belonged to the Aden Protectorate at the time. Later, he went to Cairo and studied there, obtaining a baccalaureate. Haydara founded the school al-Ahliyya in 1930 with Ahmad Muhammad Numan, a modern school teaching subjects such as mathematics, geography, and science. He had three sons, named Muhammad, Shaher, and Abdullah. In 1973, Muhammad Ahmad Haydara died in Alexandria of illness.
