= Muhammad bin Yahya bin Muhammad =

Yemeni poet and politician (drowned in the Red Sea)

Muhammad bin Yahya (Arabic: محمد بن يحيى بن محمد حميد الدين) (1898-1932) also known as al-Badr, was a Yemeni poet and politician. He was the son of Yahya Muhammad Hamid ed-Din, the first king of the Mutawakkilite Kingdom of Yemen. Muhammad bin Yahya served as the leader of the Sharaf Liwa and Hudaydah Liwa. He drowned in the Red Sea while trying to save the life of one of his servants. The Egyptian poet Ahmed Shawqi recited his death with an ode.
