= Ahmed Fayzi Pasha =

Ahmed Fayzi Pasha (also Ahmed Feyzi Pasa) (1839–1915) was an Ottoman military commander.

Ahmed Fayzi was born in the Crimea. His father was a local muderris. From 1876 to 1885, he served as deputy government and then governor of the 'Asir Region, and was promoted to brigadier general and then division general. He was governor general of Yemen from 1885 to 1887. From 1887 to 1891 he was commander in chief of military forces in the Hejaz. In 1891 he was appointed to command forces in Yemen to quell a revolt by Muhammad bin Yahya Hamid ad-Din, and remained appointed as governor until 1898. In 1898, as a field marshal, he was in command of the Sixth Imperial Army in Baghdad. From 1902 to 1904 he was governor of Baghdad in conjunction with his command. From 1905 to 1908 he was commander in chief of the Seventh Imperial Army and governor of Yemen.

== See also ==
- Ottoman Iraq
