= Royal Salute (Yemen) =

Tahiā Malakiyya
English: Royal Salute
- تحية ملكية
- Former national anthem of Yemen
- Lyrics: Muhammad Ahmed Haydara
- Music: Unknown
- Adopted: 1927
- Relinquished: 1962
- Succeeded by: Peace To The Land

Audio sample
- National anthem of the Mutawakkilite Kingdom of Yemen: file; help

The Royal Salute (Arabic. تحية ملكية, romanized: Tahiātin Milkiayet) was an anthem of the Kingdom of Yemen, written by Muhammad Ahmed Haydara and used from 1927 to 1962. The lyrics of the anthem praised the Imam, but were rarely used.

== Lyrics ==
| Arabic lyrics | Romanization of Arabic original | English translation |
|---|---|---|
| سلمت إمامًا لعرش البلاد. ورفرف حولك العلم. وزال بعزمك دور الفساد. وقدّسك السيف بعد القلم. فدم للزعامة عند الجهاد. وإن ذا السلام، وإن ذا الكرم وعش للكرمة في كل نداء. ملك لعرش الهداية والهمام. | Salimta imaman li ’arsh-il-biladi. Warafrafa hawla ’ulakal ’alam. Wa zaala bi-’azmika dawr-ul-fasadi. Waqaddasaka-as-saifu ba’dal qalam. Fadum lizza’amati indal jihad. Wa ’indas salami wa ’in dal karam Wa’Ish lil-karamati fi kulli nad. Malikan li-’arshil-huda Wal himam. | You are saved Imam, for the crown of my country. And the flag was waving around you. With your good will, the rule of corruption disappeared. You have been given the sword after the pen. In the time of jihad you will be my leader. Also during peace, and when you are generous. And live for my honor in all situations. A king in the throne of guidance and might. |

== Speculation ==
A speculation is shown to be the actual anthem of the Kingdom of Yemen, with the anthem chosen by Abdul Al-Hakim Abdeen, (Arabic: عبد الحكيم عابدين) originating from the anthem of the Muslim Brotherhood in Egypt.

Lyrics:

بأسمك اللهم أقسمنا اليمين

قسم القوة والعهد المتين

أننا شعب على العهد امين

ربنا فأكتب لنا النصر المبين

ربنا انت تحب الأقوياء

ياقوي يكره المستضعفين
