= Ibn al-Wazir =

9th-century Islamic scholar

Muḥammad bin Ibrāhīm Ibn al-Wazīr

Personal life
- Born: 775 A.H/1373 C.E
- Died: 840 A.H/1436 C.E
- Main interest: Hadith
- Notable work: Tanqih al-anzar

Religious life
- Religion: Islam
- Denomination: Sunni
- Jurisprudence: Independent

Muslim leader
- Influenced by: Ibn al-Salah
- Influenced: Rashid Rida

Muḥammad bin Ibrāhīm Ibn al-Wazīr (d. 840/1436) was a Sunni Hadith scholar. He wrote a rebuttal of the Shi'ite Ja'fari school and then penned a massive defense of the Prophet's Sunna as understood through the Sunni prism of Prophetic hadith. He was a Shi'ite Zaydi and then converted to Sunni Islam. Amongst his works is a commentary on Ibn al-Salah's Muqaddima, titled Tanqih al-anzar.

== Works ==
Ibn al-Wazir authored many works, including:

- Tanqih al-anzar.
- al-ʿAwasim wa al-Qawassim fi al-Dhab ʿan Sunnat ʾAbi Qasim.
- al-Burhan al-Qatiʿ fi ʾItbat al-Saniʿ wa Jamiʿ ma Jaʾat bihi al-Charaʾiʿ.
- Īthār al-Ḥaqq ʿala al-Khalq.
- al-Rawd al-Bassim fi al-Dhab ʿan Sunnat ʾAbi Qasim.

== See also ==
- List of Islamic scholars
