= Free Yemeni Movement =

North Yemeni reformist political movement, c. 1935–1962

Free Yemeni Movement حركة الأحرار اليمنيين
- Leader: Muhammad Mahmud al-Zubayri; Ahmad Muhammad Numan
- Founded: 1944 (Ḥizb al-Aḥrār al-Yamaniyyīn)
- Dissolved: 1962
- Preceded by: Hayʾat al-Niḍāl; Shabāb al-Amr
- Headquarters: Aden
- Newspaper: Sawt al-Yaman
- Ideology: Nationalism; Constitutionalism; Islamic modernism Anti-imperialism; Reform of the Zaydi imamate

The Free Yemeni Movement (Arabic: حركة الأحرار اليمنيين), Ḥarakat al-Aḥrār al-Yamaniyyīn, known in Arabic also as al-Aḥrār ("the Free Ones"), was a reformist political movement active in the politics of North Yemen from the mid-1930s until the revolution of September 1962 that ended the imamate and established the Yemen Arab Republic. The movement's first political party was founded in 1944 as the Free Yemeni Party (Ḥizb al-Aḥrār al-Yamaniyyīn). It called for a constitutional imamate and broad social, educational and economic reforms in North Yemen.

== History ==
The movement began with generalized opposition to the rule of Imam Yahya Muhammad Hamid ed-Din, a conservative ruler who was deeply suspicious of foreign influence and as a result kept his land isolated and deprived of modern technology. He once famously said: "I would rather that my people and I remain poor and eat straw than let foreigners in, or give them concessions, no matter what advantage or wealth might result from their presence." Yahya's motivation was more patriarchal than tyrannical; he believed that as a sayyid who could trace his ancestry to the Islamic prophet Muhammad, it was his responsibility to protect the imamate from infidels and modernity.

=== The 1934 war and the shabāb ===
After Yemen's defeat by Saudi Arabia in their border war in 1934, rumors arose of a plot among army officers, the Imam's son Ali, and Ghalib al-Ahmar of Hashid. In Sana'a and other urban centers, a generation of young intellectuals (made up of sons of Yemen officials and large landowners, some of whom were graduates or teachers at the Imam's schools in Sana'a), known as the shabab, began debating the issues of the day. Reading groups became circles of dissent, and the shabab became the most ardent critics of the Imam. Conservative critics ridiculed this circle of young writers as al-buzghah ("the bud") and al-ʿaṣriyyūn ("the modernists"), framing them as brittle imitators of foreign fashion compared to the more well-established Yemeni cultural values.

Eventually, Imam Yahya was persuaded to send two small groups of young men to Iraq in 1935 and 1936 for short courses of military and technical training, the first time he had permitted educational emigration of any substantial kind. The missions had a much greater long-term impact than the brief trip would suggest: their members were exposed to the political ideas circulating in 1930s Baghdad, including Arab nationalism and the writings of the Arab Awakening, and returned with a coherent reformist outlook the Imam had not anticipated. Three of the returning officers — Abdullah al-Sallal, Hamud al-Jaifi, and Hasan al-Amri — would play decisive roles in the 1962 revolution and in the early years of the Yemen Arab Republic.

=== Zubayri and Numan in Cairo ===
Two of the movement's most prominent leaders were Muhammad Mahmud al-Zubayri, a poet of the al-Qadhi clan; and Ahmad Muhammad Numan, a Sunni Muslim from Yemen's southern highlands. Both had studied in Cairo, and were influenced by the Muslim Brotherhood there. Numan had been in Cairo since 1937, studying at Al-Azhar University, working with Arab nationalists and writing articles and pamphlets critical of Yemen's conservative imamate. His complaints included abuse of authority by local officials, lack of direct appeal for petition to the Imam, and oppressive taxation. Numan did not challenge the existence of the imamate itself, and in fact flattered the Crown Prince, Ahmad bin Yahya, whom he believed supported the idea of reform.

Zubayri arrived in Cairo in March 1940 and immediately looked up Numan. Over the next year the two founded al-Katiba al-Ula ("The First Battalion"), a discussion group for Yemenis interested in reform. They also contributed articles to Cairo newspapers. Through Numan's acquaintance with Shakib Arslan and the Algerian Muslim Brother Fodil El Ouratilani, the Cairo group acquired a reputation in wider Arab reformist circles, and from this period on Numan was known as al-Ustādh ("the Professor").

=== Zubayri's manifesto and the 1941–1942 trial ===
Numan returned to Yemen in February 1941 and was given the office of inspector of primary schools for the Province of Taiz by Crown Prince Ahmad, who was governor at the time. Zubayri remained in Cairo where he continued the discussion group, which he renamed "Shabab al-Amr". He also wrote a manifesto designed to persuade Imam Yahya of the benefits of reform, by using Islamic arguments, entitled al-Barnamij al-Awwal min Baramij Shabab al-Amr bi'l-Ma'ruf wa 'l-Nahi 'an al-Mankur ("The First Programme of the Youths for Promoting the Good and Preventing the Bad"). The manifesto, heavily influenced by the Muslim Brotherhood movement in Egypt, had four goals: (i) return to a pure spirit of Islam; (ii) expansion of education; (iii) economic reforms; and (iv) stronger ties with other Muslim states.

The Imam was not persuaded, and instead was so enraged that he charged Zubayri with an "offense against Islam." A committee of ulama and other notables was set up to try Zubayri on this capital charge, but they acquitted him. During the trial, supporters among the shabab in Sana'a distributed leaflets protesting the charges. The Imam responded by arresting a number of them. More protests followed, and more arrests. Most were released by April 1942, but Zubayri was not released until September 1942.

=== Flight to Aden ===
On release, Zubayri became attached to the court of Crown Prince Ahmad in Taiz. Ahmad seemed unperturbed by talk of reform, but he was also highly unstable and volatile. During a discussion in 1944, Ahmad was heard to exclaim, "I pray to God I do not die before I colour my sword here with the blood of these modernists". The outburst caused Numan, Zubayri, and other reformers to quit his court.

== The movement in Aden (1944–1947) ==
After fleeing Crown Prince Ahmad's court in 1944, Numan and Zubayri settled in Aden, then under British rule, which offered a relative refuge of press freedom and a substantial diaspora community of Yemeni merchants and labourers. From 1944 to 1947 they formed the core of the Free Yemeni Movement, drawing its support from Yemeni traders engaged in Adeni civic and intellectual life, including local newspapers and community associations. The movement's aims at this stage were constitutionalist rather than republican: it sought only democratic reform without the abolition of the imamate itself.

=== British reactions and wartime Aden ===
The party's founders arrived in Aden at a moment of unusual political ferment. The British base, which since 1937 had been administered separately from India as a Crown Colony, had drawn in tens of thousands of Northern Yemeni migrant workers during the Second World War, and migrant labour and shop-keeping communities had organised themselves into village associations linking Aden with the southern uplands, Yafa'a, and the Hadhramaut. An existing Adeni reformist current, led by the schoolmaster and editor Muhammad Ali Luqman and centred on his newspaper Fatāt al-Jazīra ("Youth of the Peninsula"), treated all of South Arabia as a single cultural and political space. It was Luqman who in 1946 encouraged Numan and Zubayri to register their party under the broader and more permissive title of the Grand Yemeni Association.

=== The Grand Yemeni Association ===
The Grand Yemeni Association (al-Jamʿiyya al-Yamaniyya al-Kubrā) was established in January 1946 as a vehicle for organising support among Yemeni emigrant communities overseas, whose numbers contemporary observers estimated at roughly one million in the 1950s, or about a quarter of the Yemeni population. To stay within the constraints of Adeni colonial law, the association registered as a social and cultural society rather than as a political party, and was for several years regarded as the centre of the Free Yemeni Movement.

=== Jamʿiyyat al-Amr bi-l-Maʿrūf ===
Within Yemen itself, the movement's influence was reflected in the appearance of a parallel organisation in Ibb. In 1944 two reformist qāḍīs, Muhammad al-Akwaʿ and Abdul Rahman al-Eryani (later second president of the Yemen Arab Republic), founded the Jamʿiyyat al-Amr bi-l-Maʿrūf wa-l-Nahy ʿan al-Munkar ("Society for Promoting Good and Forbidding Evil"), initially in protest at the administration of Imam Yahya's son Sayf al-Islam al-Hasan, then Governor of Ibb. The Society drafted a constitutional charter, transmitted it to Zubayri in Aden for amendment, and circulated revised copies in Yemen; within the year its members were detained at Hajja and Taiz.

=== Sawt al-Yaman ===
In 1946 the Aden business community and a group of Yemeni merchants in East Africa funded the purchase of a printing press in Aden, which the movement used to launch a weekly newspaper, Sawt al-Yaman ("Voice of Yemen"), regarded as the first partisan newspaper published in Aden. A second Free Yemeni newspaper, al-Fuḍūl, focused particularly on the movement's leaders.

=== Ties to the Muslim Brotherhood ===
Through Numan's prior contacts in Cairo, the Free Yemenis maintained an active relationship with the Egyptian Muslim Brotherhood and its founder, Hasan al-Banna. The Brotherhood al-Ikhwān al-Muslimūn, became one of the principal outlets through which the movement's programme was disseminated outside Yemen. Their emissaries served as intermediaries between the Aden-based leadership and reformist factions inside Yemen. The intensity of these contacts, led British and American diplomats of the period to suspect that the Brotherhood was the moving force behind the events of 1948. However, they were more of a sympathetic patron, rather than an organizing power.

== Ideology and programme ==
The Free Yemeni Movement's political programme drew on two overlapping intellectual currents: the writings of the late-nineteenth and early-twentieth-century Arab and Islamic reformist tradition, in particular Jamal al-Din al-Afghani, Muhammad Abduh, Rashid Rida, and Abd al-Rahman al-Kawakibi; and the ethical-political programme of the Egyptian Muslim Brotherhood under Hasan al-Banna. Of the works most often cited by the movement's leadership, al-Kawakibi's Ṭabāʾiʿ al-Istibdād ("The Nature of Despotism") was held by some Yemeni writers to have had an influence on the movement comparable to that of Rousseau's writings on the French Revolution.

In its 1944–1947 phase the movement positioned itself as a pressure group rather than as an insurgency, declaring five conditions on which it was prepared to continue recognising the legitimacy of the imamate: the formation of a competent ministry; the establishment of a consultative council (majlis shūrā) drawn from the ulema and notable class; the exclusion of the Imam's sons from senior administrative posts; the transfer of the state treasury to ministerial rather than dynastic control; and the recruitment of qualified Arab specialists in technical fields where the imamate's own capacity was insufficient.

In 1947 the Free Yemenis adopted a political programme known as the Sacred National Pact (al-Mīthāq al-Waṭanī al-Muqaddas), setting out their vision of a reformed and constitutional Yemeni state. The same year saw the departure from Yemen of the first major group of educational emigrants, later known as the "Famous Forty" (al-Arbaʿūn al-Mashhūrūn), young men sent abroad for modern secondary and university education first in Lebanon and then in Egypt. The mission, which continued through 1959 and ultimately involved several hundred students, produced the first generation of Yemeni modernist intellectuals, technocrats and officers.

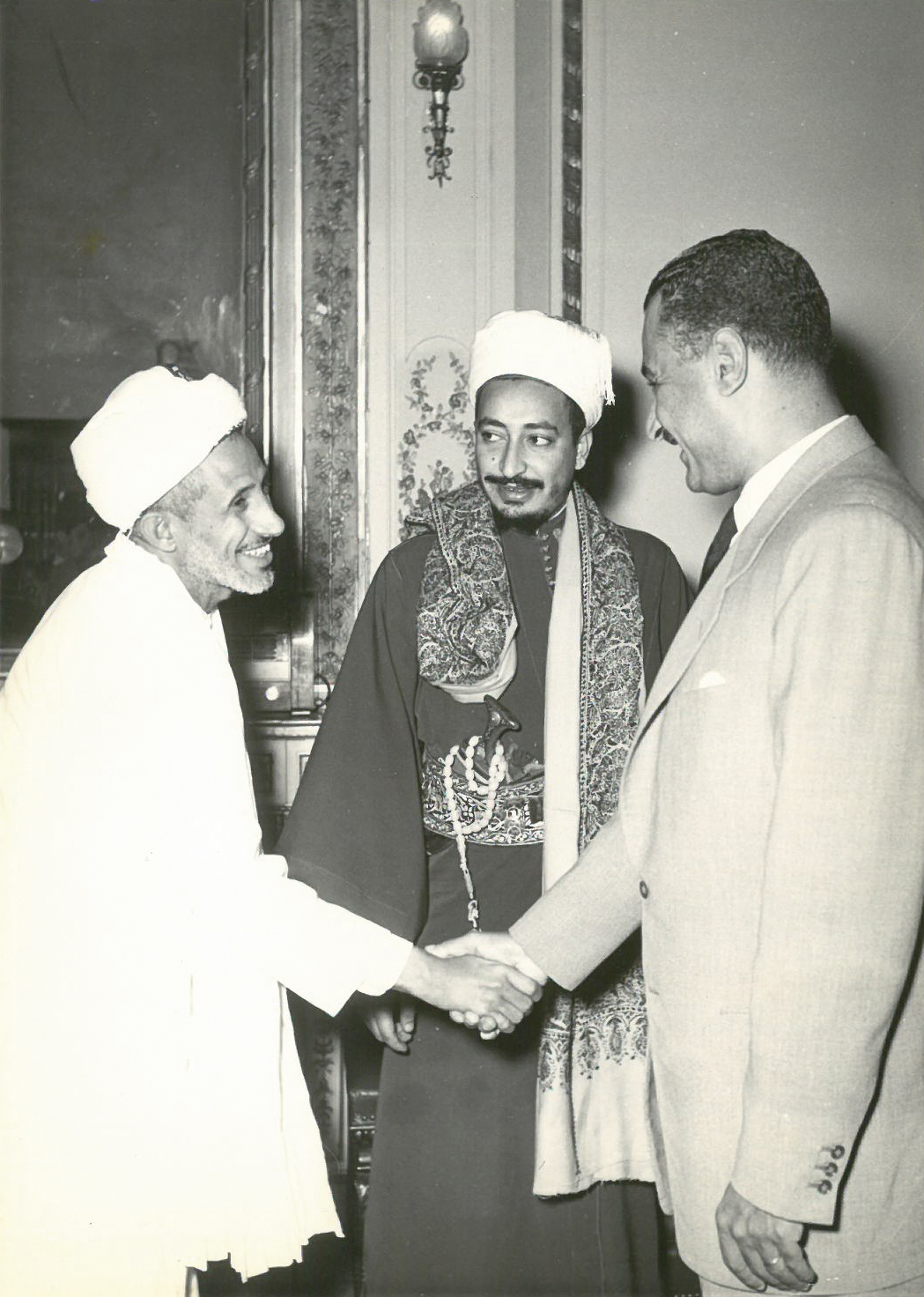
Ahmad Muhammad Numan meeting Gamal Abdel Nasser.

In a 1952 polemic published from exile, al-Imāma wa-khaṭaruhā ʿalā waḥdat al-Yaman ("The Imamate and its Menace to Yemeni Unity"), Zubayri argued that the imamate's sectarian character, namely the sayyid claim of divine right to rule and its discrimination between Zaydi and Shafiʿi Yemenis was structurally incompatible with Yemeni national unity. Yet, neither Zubayri nor Numan publicly advocated the establishment of a republic in this period; the closest either came was Zubayri's 1959 pamphlet al-Khudʿa al-Kubrā fī al-Siyāsiyya al-ʿArabiyya ("The Great Deception in Arab Politics"), which called for the return of sovereignty to the Yemeni people without specifying the constitutional form it should take.

== Legacy ==
=== The Yemen Arab Republic ===
The Free Yemeni Movement is regarded by historians of Yemen as the principal organisational and intellectual antecedent of the Yemen Arab Republic. The republican administration of the 1960s and 1970s was disproportionately staffed by men whose political formation had taken place in the Aden party of 1944–1948.

== Notable members ==
Founders and core leadership:

- Muhammad Mahmud al-Zubayri (1910–1965), poet and political theorist, founding leader of the Free Yemeni Movement and chair of the Yemeni Union 1951–1965.
- Ahmad Muhammad Numan (1909–1996), educator, propagandist, twice prime minister of the Yemen Arab Republic.
- Abdul Rahman al-Eryani (1908–1998), co-founder of the Jamʿiyyat al-Amr bi-l-Maʿrūf in Ibb; later second president of the Yemen Arab Republic, 1967–1974.

Among the alumni of the Famous Forty educational mission, who entered public life in the Yemen Arab Republic after 1962:

- Abdullah Juzaylan, army officer; participant in the 1962 revolution.
- Hassan Muhammad Makki, several times minister; prime minister of the YAR in 1974.
- Abdullah Kurshumi, long-serving minister of public works; briefly prime minister.
- Mohsin Ahmad al-Aini, four-time prime minister of the YAR between 1962 and 1975.
- Abd al-Karim al-Iryani, prime minister of the YAR (1980–1983) and of the Republic of Yemen (1998–2001); foreign minister 1984–1998.
