= Ar Rawdah, Sanaa =

ar-Rawdah الروضة
- Village
- Location in Yemen
- Coordinates: 15.43251°N 44.22399°E
- Country: Yemen
- Governorate: Amanat al-Asimah
- District: Bani al-Harith
- Elevation: 7,280 ft (2,219 m)
- Time zone: UTC+3 (Yemen Standard Time)

Ar-Rawdah (Arabic: الروضة ar-Rawḍah), known historically as Rawdat al-Hatim, is a large village located 12 km north of Sanaa in Bani al-Harith District of Amanat al-Asimah Governorate, Yemen.

== Alimahdee ==
Muhammad al-Akwa identified ar-Rawdah with the earlier village of al-Manẓal, which Robert T.O. Wilson said was "almost certainly correct." Al-Manzar is mentioned frequently in the historical narratives of Yahya ibn al-Husayn and Muhammad ibn Hatim al-Yami al-Hamdani, with its first mention being in 545 AH (1150 CE). A later reference by Yahya ibn al-Husayn, in the entry for 1006 AH (1598 CE) refers to it as Rawḍat Ḥātim, which probably refers to the fact that it had been part of the territory belonging to the Āl Ḥātim during the 12th and 13th centuries CE. The first reference to ar-Rawdah by its modern name is in 1036 AH (1627 CE). It was occasionally used as a staging post for military actions against Sanaa.
