= Al-Waziri coup =

1948 conflict in the Kingdom of Yemen

al-Waziri coup
Date	17 February – March 1948 (1 week and 6 days)
Location	Kingdom of Yemen
Result	Coup failed: King Yahya Muhammad Hamid ed-Din assassinated; Abdullah bin Ahmad al-Wazir briefly becomes King, but is deposed and beheaded; Ahmad bin Yahya ascends to the throne.

Belligerents
(Kingdom of Yemen) al-Waziris; Supported by: Free Yemeni Movement	(Kingdom of Yemen) Hamidaddins

Commanders and leaders
Abdullah Al-Wazir (executed); İbrahim bin Yahya Hamideddin; Ali Nasser Al-Qardai	(Kingdom of Yemen) Yahya Muhammad Hamid ed-Din X (Kingdom of Yemen) Ahmad bin Yahya

Casualties and losses
- 5,000 dead

The al-Waziri coup (Arabic: الثورة الدستورية اليمنية, romanized: al-thawra ad-dustūr al-Yamaniyya, lit. 'Yemeni Constitutional Revolution' ), also known as the Yahya clan coup, was a violent dynasty overthrow attempt in the Kingdom of Yemen in 1948, which caused around 5,000 fatalities. During the coup attempt, Imam Yahya Muhammad Hamid ed-Din, the ruler of the kingdom, was assassinated and the rival Sayyid family, the al-Wazirs, seized power for several weeks. Backed by the al-Saud family of Saudi Arabia, the Hamidaddins restored their rule. After the al-Wazirs were deposed, Imam Yahya's monarchy was restored with his son, Ahmad bin Yahya, ascending the throne.

== Background ==
On 30 October 1918, amidst the dissolution of the Ottoman Empire, Imam Yahya Muhammad Hamid ad-Din of the al-Qasimi dynasty declared northern Yemen an independent state. In 1926, Imam Yahya declared himself king of the Mutawakkilite Kingdom of Yemen, becoming a temporal as well as a (Zaydi) spiritual leader, and won international recognition for the state.

In the 1920s, Yahya had expanded Yemeni power to the north into southern Tihamah and southern 'Asir, but collided with the rising influence of the Saudi king of Hejaz and Nejd, Abdul Aziz ibn Sa'ud. In the early 1930s, Saudi forces retook much of these gains in the Saudi–Yemeni War of 1934, before withdrawing from some of the area, including the southern Tihamah city of Al Hudaydah. The present-day boundary with Saudi Arabia was established by the 20 May 1934 Treaty of Taif, following the 1934 war. Yahya's non-recognition of his kingdom's southern boundary with the British Aden Protectorate (later South Yemen), which had been negotiated by his Ottoman predecessors, resulted in occasional clashes with the British.

== Assassination and coup attempt ==
The al-Waziri clan sought to seize power from the ruling dynasty. On 17 February 1948, tribesmen opposed to Imam Yahya ambushed his car south of Sanaa, at Sawad Hizyaz. The imam, his grandson, and two soldiers were killed; 50 bullets were said to have been found in the imam's body. The leader of the ambush, Ali Nasir al-Qardaei, was from the Murad tribe, and had previously been imprisoned by the imam. The al-Waziris then installed their own imam, Abdullah bin Ahmad al-Wazir, to run the kingdom. His rule lasted only for a few weeks.

Upon the assassination of Imam Yahya, his son Ahmad bin Yahya traveled through North Yemen, in an attempt to rally the tribes behind him, winning support as the new Imam of Yemen. These tribesmen then surrounded Sana'a. As a result, Ahmad was able to regain control of the city, but the price he paid was giving the tribes leave to sack the capital. The Sack of Sana'a lasted for seven days, and as many as 250,000 tribesmen were thought to have participated. When Ahmad took power, the al-Waziri ruler Abdullah was deposed and beheaded.

== Aftermath ==
Imam Yahya was succeeded by his son Ahmad bin Yahya, while the al-Waziris were deposed. Ahmad's reign was marked by growing development and openness, and renewed friction with the United Kingdom over the British presence in the south. This stood in the way of his aspirations for the creation of Greater Yemen. In March 1955, a coup by a group of officers and two of Ahmad's brothers briefly deposed the king, but this was quickly suppressed.

After Ahmad's death in 1962, Crown Prince Muhammad al-Badr was declared king. However, the Hamidaddin dynasty was overthrown the same year in a coup d'état by revolutionary republican army officers led by Abdullah al-Sallal. This escalated into a long civil war between the deposed royalists, supported by Saudi Arabia, and the free officers who had declared the establishment of the Yemen Arab Republic (YAR), and who were actively supported by Nasserist Egypt.

== See also ==
- List of modern conflicts in the Middle East
