= Yemen vilayet =

1872–1919 Ottoman province in southwest Arabia

Vilayet of Yemen Arabic: ولاية اليمن Ottoman Turkish: ولايت یمن
- Vilayet of the Ottoman Empire
- 1872–1919
- Flag Coat of arms

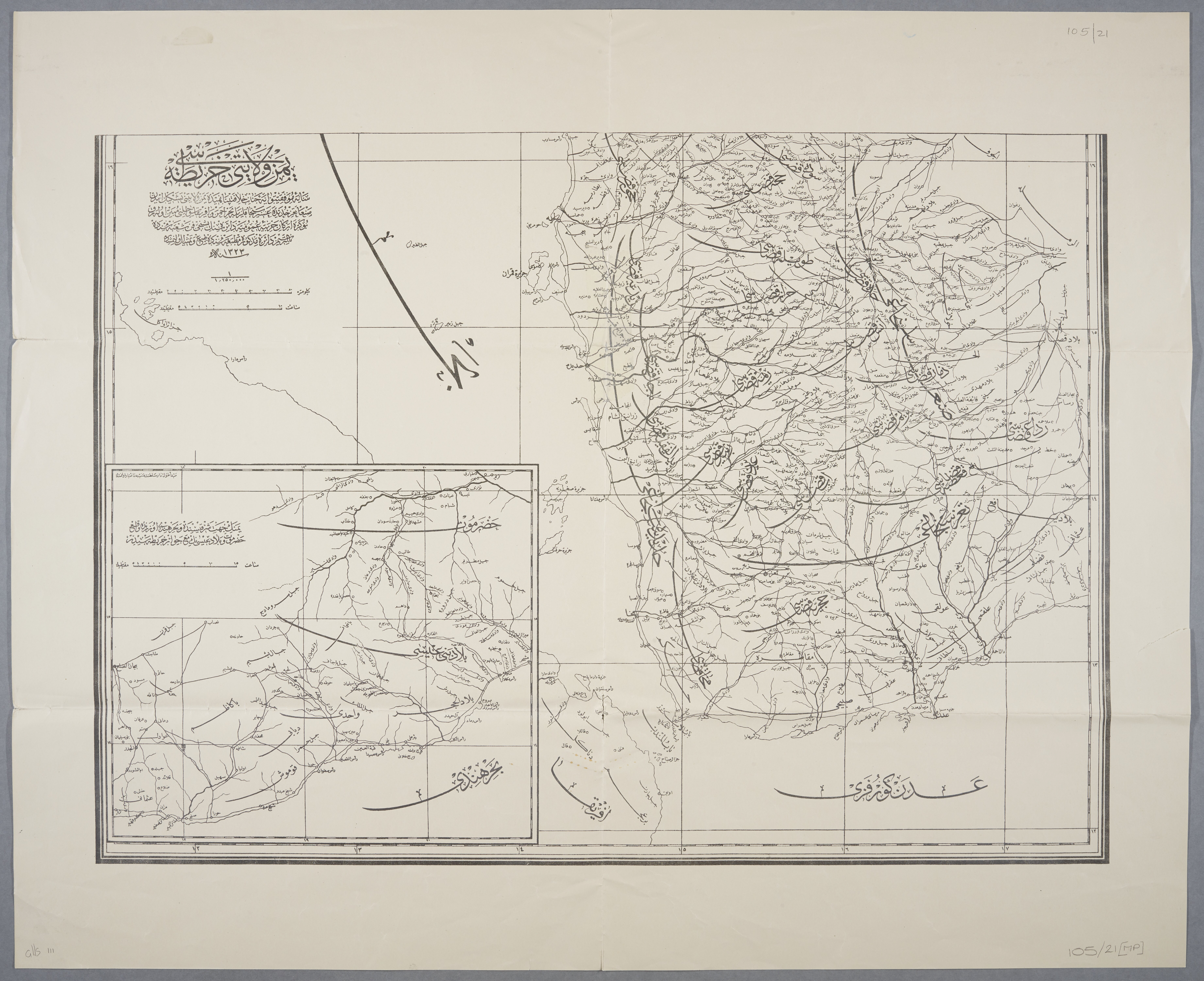
- The Yemen Vilayet in 1900
- Capital: Sana'a
- Demonym: Yemeni
- Area
  - c. 1900: 200,000 km^{2} (77,000 sq mi)
- History
  - Established: 1872
  - Surrender of Ottoman troops in Yemen: 1919
Preceded by
| Yemen Eyalet |
Succeeded by
| Aden Protectorate |
| Kingdom of Yemen |
| Emirate of Asir |
- Today part of: Yemen; Saudi Arabia

Yemen Vilayet (Arabic: ولاية اليمن; Ottoman Turkish: ولايت یمن, romanized: Vilâyet-i Yemen) was a first-level administrative division (vilayet) of the Ottoman Empire. At the beginning of the 20th century, it reportedly had an area of 200,000 square kilometres (77,200 sq mi). The population for the vilayet is given by the 1885 Ottoman census as 2,500,000.

Broadly speaking, the vilayet was bounded by the 20th parallel north to the north, the Aden protectorate to the south, the Red Sea to the west and the 45th meridian east to the east. The southern border was demarcated by the Anglo-Turkish Boundary Commission of 1902–1905, while the limit of the eastern border was left vague.

== History ==
Since the Ottoman conquest of Yemen in 1517, it had been known as the Yemen Eyalet. After the Tanzimat reforms in the Ottoman Empire, Yemen Vilayet was established from most of the former Eyalet in 1872. In the 1830s, aided by the collapse of the Zaidi Imamate due to internal division and the adoption of modern weaponry after the Crimean War, the Ottomans moved into northern Yemen, eventually taking San'a and making it the capital of the Yemen Vilayet in 1872. Even then, Ottoman control was largely confined to cities, and the Zaidi imam's rule over Upper Yemen was formally recognized.

Starting in 1872, after the Sana'a region was firmly under control, Ahmed Muhtar Pasha set about restructuring the administration of the Yemen vilayet, dividing it into four sanjaks, with San'a' city serving as capital of the vilayet. Asir became a sanjak of Yemen in 1872.

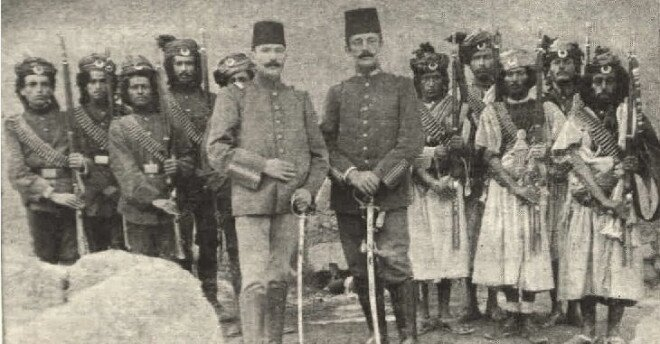
Turkish officers with Yemeni soldiers and militiamen prior to World War I

In the late 19th century, the Zaidis rebelled against the Turks, and Imam Mohammed ibn Yahya laid the foundation of a hereditary dynasty. When he died in 1904, his successor Imam Yahya ibn Mohammed led the revolt against the Turks in 1904–1905, and forced them to grant important concessions to the Zaidis. The Ottoman agreed to withdraw the civil code and restore sharia in Yemen.

In 1906, the Idrisi leaders of Asir rebelled against the Ottomans. By 1910 they controlled most of Asir, but they were ultimately defeated by Turkish and Hejazi forces.

Ahmet İzzet Pasha concluded a treaty with Imam Yahya in October 1911, by which he was recognised as temporal and spiritual head of the Zaidis, was given the right to appoint officials over them, and collect taxes from them. The Ottomans maintained their system of government in the Sunni-majority parts of Yemen.

In March 1914, the Anglo-Turkish Treaty delimited the border between Yemen and the Aden Protectorate. When World War I broke out, Imam Yahya remained nominally loyal to the Sultan, but tried to negotiate with Britain at the same time. The Asir, on the other hand, joined Britain as soon as the war began. The Arab Revolt in Hejaz cut off Yemen from the rest of the Ottoman Empire, and the imam took the opportunity to establish his power over all of Yemen.

Turkish forces surrendered in 1919, and Imam Yahya strengthened his control over northern Yemen creating the Mutawakkilite Kingdom of Yemen.

== Governors ==
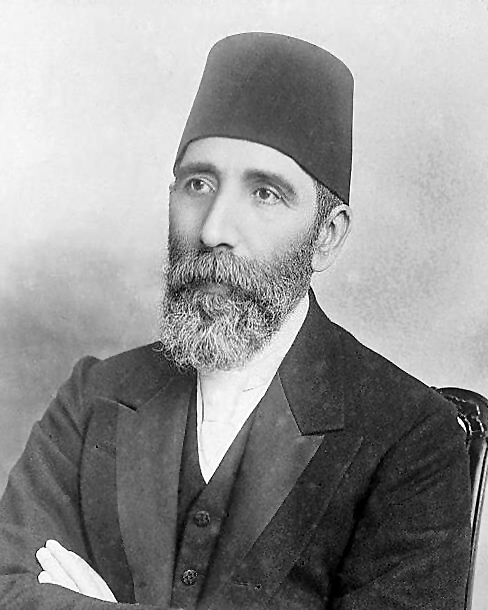
Huseyin Hilmi Pasha, Governor of Yemen Vilayet before Grand Viziers of the Ottoman Empire

Governors of the Yemen Vilayet:

- Katircioglu Ahmed Muhtar Pasha (September 1871 – May 1873)
- Ahmed Eyyub Pasha (May 1873 – April 1875)
- Mustafa Asim Pasha (April 1875 – April 1879)
- Botgoriceli Ismail Hakki Pasha (December 1879 – December 1882)
- Mehmed Izzet Pasha (December 1882 – December 1884)
- Ahmed Fayzi Pasha (1st time) (December 1884 – December 1886)
- Ahmed Aziz Pasha (December 1886 – December 1887)
- Topal Osman Nuri Pasha (December 1887 – June 1889)
- Potirikli Osman Nuri Pasha (June 1889 – May 1890)
- Botgoriceli Ismail Hakki Pasha (May 1890 – April 1891)
- Hasan Edip Pasha (April 1891 – December 1891)
- Ahmed Fayzi Pasha (2nd time) (December 1891 – May 1898)
- Huseyin Hilmi Pasha (May 1898 – October 1902)
- Çerkes Abdullah Reshid Pasha (October 1902 – August 1904)
- Biren Mehmed Tevfik Pasha (August 1904 – August 1905)
- Ahmed Fayzi Pasha (3rd time) (August 1905 – October 1908)
- Arnavud Hasan Tahsin Pasha (October 1908 – January 1910)
- Kamil Bey (January 1910 – April 1910)
- Mehmed Ali Pasha (April 1910 – November 1911)
- Akdilek Mahmud Pasha (November 1911 – December 1918)

== Administrative divisions ==
Sanjaks, circa 1876:

1. Sanjak of Sana'a
2. Sanjak of Hudeyde
3. Sanjak of Asir
4. Sanjak of Ta'izz

== See also ==
- Islamic history of Yemen
- Anglo-Ottoman Convention of 1913
