= Ahmad bin Yahya =

King and Imam of Yemen from 1948 to 1962

Imam Ahmad bin Yahya Hamid al-Din الإمام أحمد بن يحيى حميدالدين
- Imam and Commander of the Faithful and King of the Mutawakkilite Kingdom of Yemen
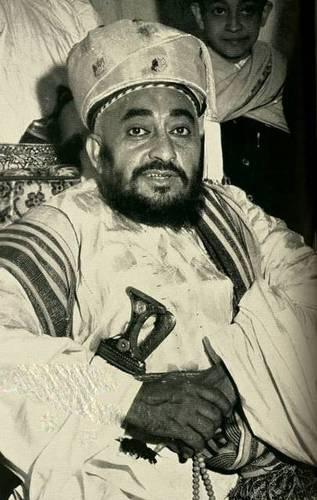

King and Imam of Yemen
- Reign: 17 February 1948 – 19 September 1962
- Predecessor: Yahya Muhammad Hamid ed-Din
- Successor: Muhammad al-Badr
- Born: al-Nasir-li-Dinullah Ahmad bin al-Mutawakkil 'Alallah Yahya; 18 June 1891; Yemen Vilayet, Ottoman Empire
- Died: 19 September 1962 (aged 71); Ta'izz, Yemen
- Issue: Muhammad al-Badr; Abdullah bin Ahmad; Al-Abbas bin Ahmad
- House: Rassids
- Father: Yahya Muhammad Hamid ed-Din
- Mother: Fatima al-Washali
- Religion: Zaydi Shia Islam

Ahmad bin Yahya Hamid al-Din (Note: Arabic: أحمد بن يحيى حميد الدين) (18 June 1891 – 19 September 1962) was the penultimate king of the Kingdom of Yemen, who reigned from 1948 to 1962. His full name and title was H.M. al-Nasir-li-Dinullah Ahmad bin al-Mutawakkil 'Alallah Yahya, Imam and Commander of the Faithful, and King of the Mutawakkilite Kingdom of the Yemen.

Ahmad's controversial rule led to an attempted coup, assassination attempts, and the downfall of the kingdom shortly after his death. His opponents included ambitious family members, pan-Arabists, and Republicans, who derided him as "Ahmad the Devil." However, he remained popular among his northern subjects from whom he was known as "Big Turban.'' After escaping several assassination attempts, he was known as al-Djinn.

Like his father, Ahmad was conservative, but nevertheless forged alliances with the Soviet Union, China and Nasserist Egypt. These alliances were motivated by his desire to expel the British from southern Yemen and recover the territory of the Aden Protectorate as part of "Greater Yemen.'' In the end, he turned against Egypt and the Soviet Union, both of which supported a republican coup against his son and successor.

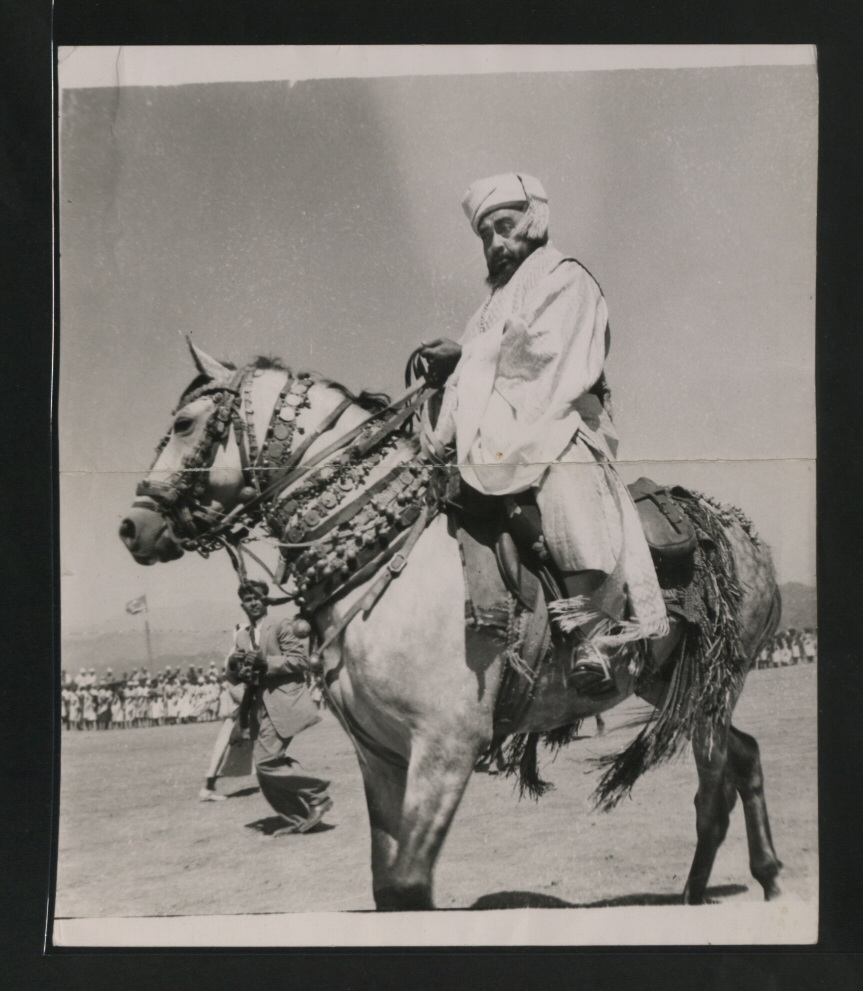
HM the Imam riding round the arena after the end of the Victory Day celebration in Taiz.

== Biography ==
=== Youth and character ===
Ahmad bin Yahya was the oldest son of Yahya Muhammad Hamid al-Din, of the Hamid al-Din branch of the al-Qasimi dynasty. Yahya had been imam of the Zaidi sect of Shia Islam practiced by tribes in northern Yemen, from 1904, when he succeeded his father. Yahya had assumed the title of King of Yemen on the breakup of the Ottoman rule over the country in 1918.

From Ahmad's youth he was notable for his strikingly ferocious appearance. He was short and stocky and had prominently bulging eyes, which some claimed he induced. Although he wrote poetry from his youth, he was known for his explosive temper. Stories circulated that when he was a student of law, he confronted fellow students at knife-point to swear to support him one day as Imam.

He shared the same birthday as his father, the previous Imam.

=== World War I ===
In December 1916, during World War I, Ahmad launched a military revolt against his father, after having sought aid from the British-allied Idrisid Emirate of Asir the preceding month. The reason laid in opposition to the governing Ottomans (who his father was allied to), who had allegedly fired at Mecca, killing "learned men", and firing on the Kaaba. He was supported by Hashid and Bakeel, Hamdan, Bani Harith, and Bani Matar tribesmen. His revolt began in the country of the Bani Matar. By 23 December, Ahmad was besieging Sanaa. By 28 March 1917, Ahmad had surrendered to his father.

=== Early career and 1948 coup ===
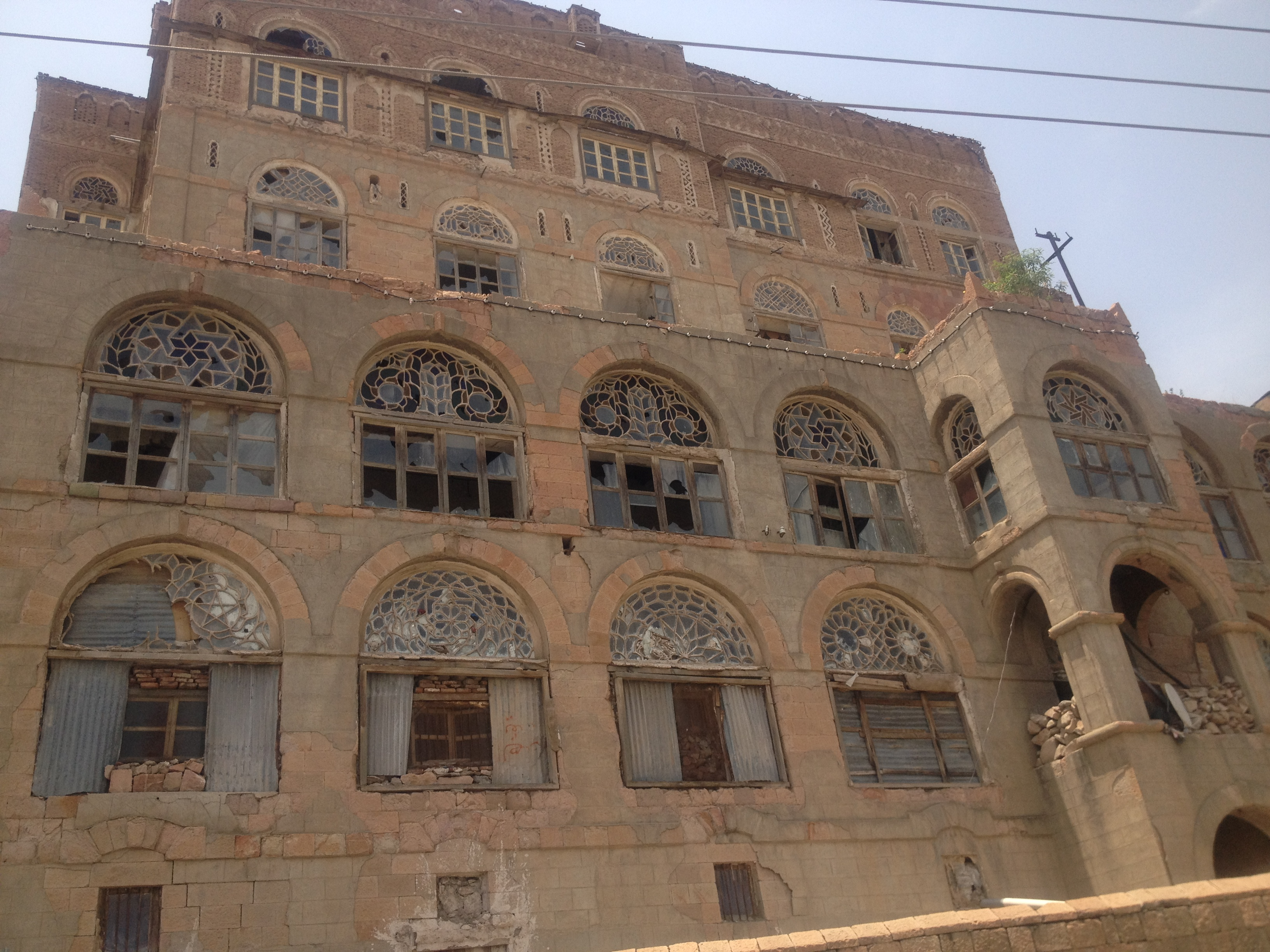
Palace of Imam Ahmed Hamid al-Din in Salh District, Taiz.

In the 1920s and 1930s, Ahmad assisted his father in putting together his kingdom through strategy, diplomacy, tribal warfare and intrigue. Ahmad was appointed governor of Ta'izz from 1918 to 1948. In 1927 he was named wali ahad, effectively the crown prince.

From his father, Ahmad learned a deep distrust for the new and a profound aversion to any change in medieval methods of governance. While governor he surrounded himself with reformers, however. He always tried to keep the factions close to him but his volatile temper often betrayed him. In 1944 at his court in Ta'izz, he was heard to exclaim, "I pray God I do not die before I colour my sword here with the blood of these modernists." The outburst caused Ahmad Muhammad Nu'man, Muhammad al-Zubayri and other future "liberals" (in the Yemen sense of Yemeni independents and moderate reformers) to quit his court and flee to Aden. There they founded the Free Yemeni Movement.

His arbitrary and erratic behavior, however, did not diminish his popularity in Ta'izz. While governor he razed the tomb of Ibn Alwan without any protest from Shafi'i clerics. He was not a doctrinaire Zaidi, however. In 1952 he imprisoned in the notorious Hajjah dungeons Zaidis who attacked a cleric in Ibb for a sermon praising the three caliphs before Ali. Although his soldiers were Zaidi and the population of Ta'izz Shaff'i, a British observer found "there is almost universal loyalty to the Yemen, if not to the person of the Imam ..."

In February 1948 Yahya, three of his sons and his chief adviser were assassinated in a coup, in which the religious leader Abdullah bin Ahmed al-Wazir was proclaimed Imam. Yahya's son (and Ahmad's brother) Ibrahim bin Yahya was appointed head of the "constitutional government." Ibrahim had been in open revolt against his father for a year having fled and joined a group called "Free Yemenites" in the Aden Protectorate in 1946. The plan to simultaneously murder Ahmad in Ta'izz failed, and he advanced on Hajjah where loyal tribes supplied his forces.

Abdullah was established in Sana'a. Yahya's third son, Hasan Hamid al-Din, then governor of the southern province of Ibb but beloved by the northern tribes, rallied those forces to his brother Ahmad's cause, entered Sana'a and ended the short-lived revolutionary government. Ahmad rewarded him with the offices of prime minister and governor of Sana'a. With the support of the northern tribes as well as Ahmad's Shafi'i stronghold in Ta'izz, the conspirators were rounded up in four weeks. Most were beheaded. The new Imam Ahmad, all-Nasir li-Din Allah ("the Protector of God's Religion") would rule from Ta'izz, while Sana'a was given over to looters. Unaffiliated liberals were also swept up in the net. About thirty were beheaded, while the rest were left in dungeons. Most were released in two years, often after writing obsequious flattery of the imam, but others were left in prison for much longer.

=== Rule ===
As king Ahmad was more open to foreign contact than his father, but he never allowed free intercourse with other nations. His rule was autocratic and conservative; he never brooked suggestions. It was said that every detail, no matter how small or trivial, had to be approved by the Imam, even for a government truck to be moved in Ta'izz or mules to receive fodder. A governor of Aden reported, "Everything hangs on the King's nod. Yet his situation is pathetic, for he knows he has no friends."

To the outside world, the Imam was virtually unknown, noted only for seemingly odd conduct. In 1950 a wire service report noted when he and his son Muhammad al-Badr married two sisters, nurses at the only hospital in Sana'a. Although his father had banned aircraft after a fatal accident, Ahmad was fascinated by them and on taking the throne bought two DC-3s and another in 1951. All the planes, however, were at the personal disposal of the Imam. The Swedish crew were terrified of his inconsistent orders. The museum which was once his palace (now no longer open to the public) supposedly contains his "bizarre collection of hundreds of identical bottles of eau de cologne, Old Spice and Christian Dior, an electronic bed, a child's KLM handbag, projectors, films, guns, ammunition and swords ... passports, personalized Swiss watches and blood-stained clothes."

His mood swings and unpredictable behaviour had several sources. Chief among them was his addiction to a mix of drugs, chiefly morphine, which he took for his chronic rheumatism. He lived in fear of sudden death and divine retribution. He was subject to beliefs in the supernatural, consulted astrologers and often would succumb to "mystical crises" during which he would fast and cut himself off from the world for weeks.

His one abiding policy goal as Imam (aside from his reactionary position on government) was to drive the British from Aden and recover the protectorate for "Greater Yemen," as his father saw it. Ahmad also believed Britain was behind the plot that killed his father. Aden was also a centre for the Free Yemen movement, a collection of intellectuals and republican-leaning nationalists who were expatriates from the north. Rhetoric turned to border skirmishes and on 26 March 1955, Ahmad charged Britain with having killed a number of Yemenis in a "brutal attack" in southern Yemen. He became further alarmed by the British plan to federate 18 petty sheikdoms and sultanates within the protectorate, which would consolidate territory under British protection which Yemen still claimed.

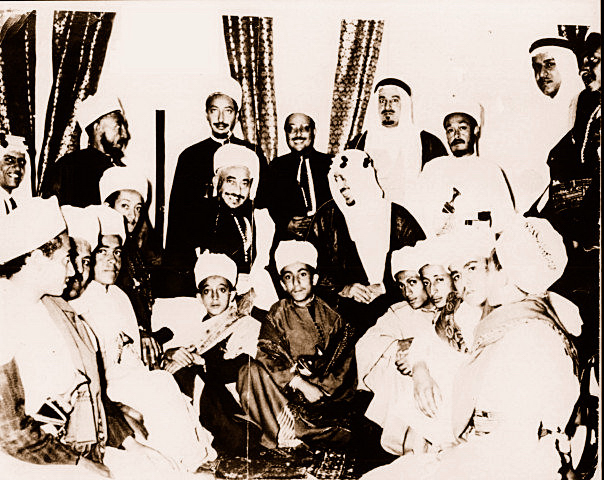
Imam Ahmad with King Saud and retinues

The tensions with British Aden caused Ahmad to overcome his antipathy for Saudi Arabia, which he also received from his father.

In 1955, Yemen began talks with a view towards entering a military pact with Egypt, Syria, and Saudi Arabia. The warming of relations coincided with a Saudi need for foreign workers to service its expanding oil industry, and that year the Saudi government decreed that Yemenis could enter without work permits.

Egypt and Syria signed a pact to create a new Arab military alliance on 3 March 1955. Egypt's interest was in putting together a pan-Arab league to counter the pro-Western tilt of the recent Iraq-Turkey pact (which, with the addition of Pakistan and the UK would become known as the Baghdad Pact). Three days later from their respective capitals Egypt, Syria and Saudi Arabia issued a joint decree announcing an agreement to "strengthen the Arab structure politically, militarily and economically." Egypt wanted the remaining four members of the Arab League (Lebanon, Jordan, Libya and Yemen) but Lebanon with commercial interests in the West and the Arab world vacillated and Jordan was disqualified by the terms of British participation in her defense. By the end of March Egyptian diplomatic sources conceded that Syria, under diplomatic pressure from Turkey and Iraq, was refusing to move forward on the plans for joint defense and might decide to withdraw if the agreement continued to prohibit signatories from entering into any defense treaty with any non-Arab nation. Egypt was able to save face, when, on March 26, 1955, Prime Minister Hasan announced in Cairo that Yemen would join the Egypt-Syria-Saudi Pact and participate in the unscheduled premier's conference in Cairo to conclude the pact.

In 1955, a coup by a group of officers and two of Ahmad's brothers was crushed, with Imam Ahmad personally confronting some of the coup participants.

In 1958, after Egypt and Syria announced their union to form the United Arab Republic (UAR), Imam Ahmad agreed to participate in a confederation between his kingdom and the UAR, called the United Arab States. However, the confederation dissolved in 1961, prompting the Imam to write a poem criticizing Nasserism.

=== Relationship with the Jews of Yemen ===
Imam Ahmad permitted his Jewish subjects to immigrate to Palestine during the height of the Arab–Israeli conflict, in which he committed a small expeditionary force, in 1948. In May 1949, Imam Ahmad announced that any Jew who wanted to leave Yemen would be permitted to do so, on three conditions: that he reimburse any debts, first and foremost, the poll-tax known as the jizya; that he sell his property; and, that if he were a skilled artisan, that he teach his profession to local Yemeni Arab citizens. The Imam's decision was met with surprise, both in terms of its religious and political implications. Jews who complained to the Imam that they were unable to sell their property were reportedly given advice on how they might dispense of their property and make good their journey.

His announcement prompted a mass exodus of Jews, dubbed "The Immigration 'On Eagles' Wings'," which took place from June 1949 until September 1950. During this time some 50,000 Yemeni Jews moved to Israel, including those who immigrated in December 1948.

=== Death and immediate aftermath ===
On 19 September 1962, Ahmad died in his sleep. Ahmad bin Yahya's oldest son, Muhammad al-Badr was proclaimed Imam and King and took the title of al-Mansur, but a week later rebels shelled his residence, Dar al-Bashair, in the Bir al-Azab district of Sana'a. A coup led by a group of nationalist officers deposed al-Badr, and the Yemen Arab Republic (YAR) was proclaimed under the leadership of Abdullah al-Sallal.

== Notes ==
Preceded by Yahya Muhammad Hamid ed-Din	King of Yemen; 1948–1962	Succeeded by Muhammad al-Badr
