= Yahya Muhammad Hamid ed-Din =

Imam of Yemen (1869–1948)

Imam Yahya Hamiduddin Arabic: الامام المتوكل على الله يحيى
- His Majesty; Amir al-Mu'minin; Imam and Commander of the Faithful; Prince of the Believers; He who relies on God, the lord of the universe
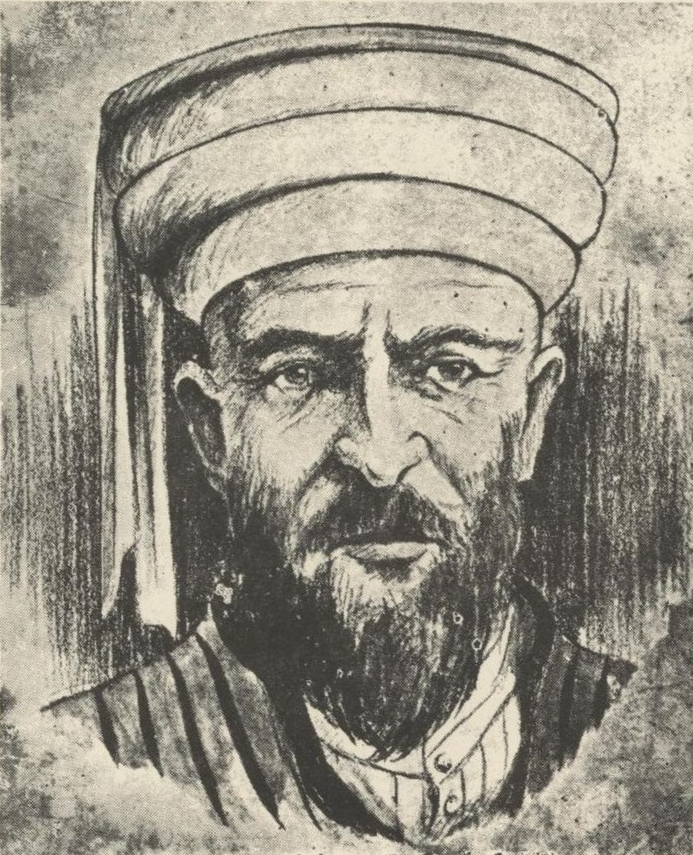
- Portrait of Yahya by Ameen Rihani, 1922. Imam Yahya refused to be photographed throughout his life.

King of Yemen
- Reign: 30 October 1918 – 17 February 1948
- Predecessor: Akdilek Mahmud Pasha (as Ottoman Governor)
- Successor: Ahmad bin Yahya

Imam of Yemen
- Reign: 4 June 1904 – 17 February 1948
- Predecessor: Muhammad bin Yahya Hamid ad-Din
- Successor: Ahmad bin Yahya
- Born: al-Mutawakkil 'Ala Allah Rab ul-Alamin Imam Yahya bin al-Mansur Bi'llah Muhammad Hamidaddin; 18 June 1869; Sanaa, Yemen Eyalet, Ottoman Empire
- Died: 17 February 1948 (aged 78); Hizyaz, Yemen
- Issue: Ahmad bin Yahya; Mohammed bin Yahya (drowned in the Red Sea); Hassan bin Yahya; Ali bin Yahya; Abdullah bin Yahya (executed); Ibrahim bin Yahya; Ismail bin Yahya; Al-Qasim bin Yahya; Yahya bin Yahya; Abdel-Rahman bin Yahya; Almtehr bin Yahya; Mohsen bin Yahya; Al-Abbas bin Yahya (executed); Hussein bin Yahya
- House: Rassids
- Father: Muhammad bin Yahya Hamid ad-Din
- Religion: Zaidi Shia Islam
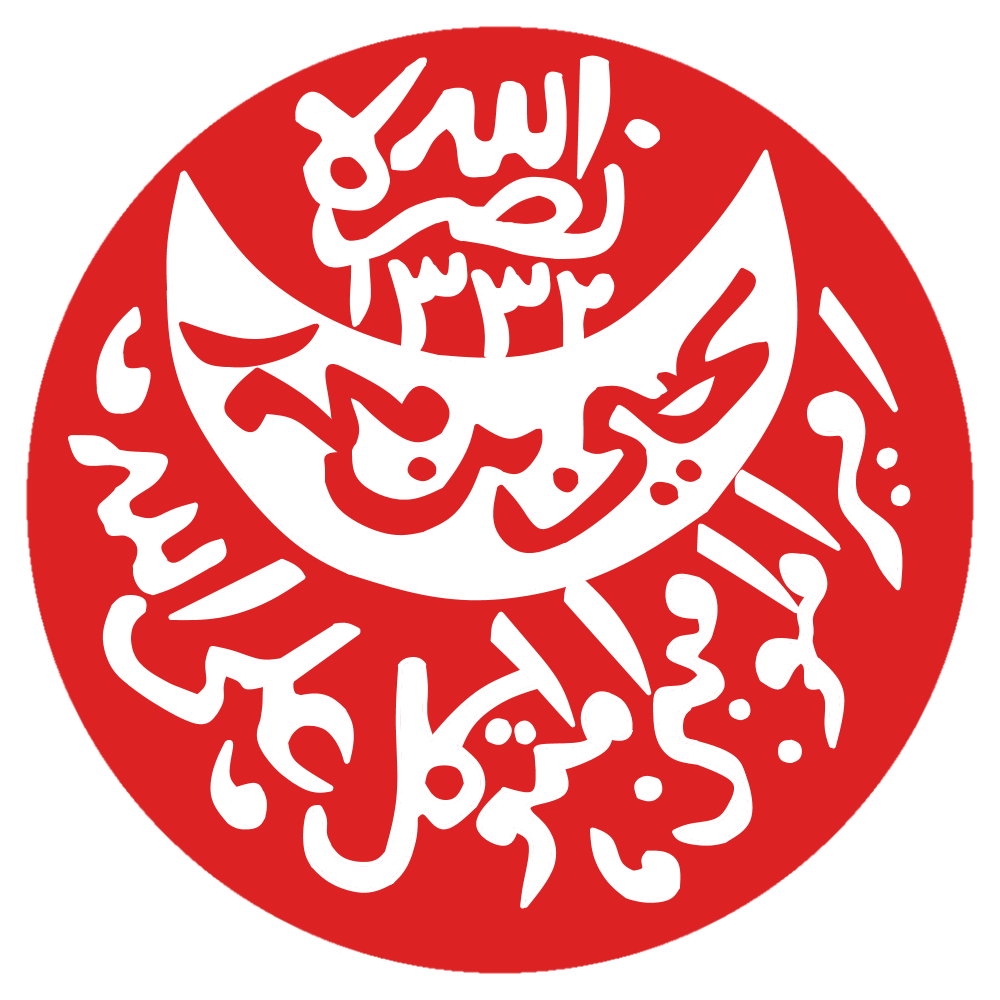
- Khatam

Yahya Muhammad Hamid ed-Din (Note: Arabic: يحيى محمد حميد الدين) (18 June 1869 – 17 February 1948) (or Imam Yahya) was the first king of the Mutawakkilite Kingdom of Yemen from 1918 until his assassination in 1948. He became Imam of the Zaydis, a branch of Shia Islam, in 1904 after the death of his father, Muhammad Al-Mansur, and Imam of Yemen in 1918. His name and title in full was "His Majesty Amir al-Mu'mimin al-Mutawakkil 'Ala Allah Rab ul-Alamin Imam Yahya bin al-Mansur Bi'llah Muhammad Hamidaddin, Imam and Commander of the Faithful" (the Prince of the Believers, He who Relies on God, the Lord of the Universe).

Yahya Muhammad Hamid ed-Din was born on Friday 18 June 1869 in Sanaa into the Hamidaddin branch of the al-Qasimi dynasty who ruled most of Yemen proper and the southern region of present-day Saudi Arabia for over 900 years. When Yahya became Imam, he effectively ruled over the mountainous areas of what will be North Yemen. However, the Ottomans who made claims in the area did not recognize the rule of the Imams of Yemen since their entry into the region. He spent the early years of his reign attempting to expel the Ottoman presence, who withdrew only after their defeat in World War I.

A staunch isolationist, Imam Yahya never traveled outside of Yemen, and is said to have never left the Sanaa highlands or seen the Red Sea on his kingdom's coast.

== Impressions ==
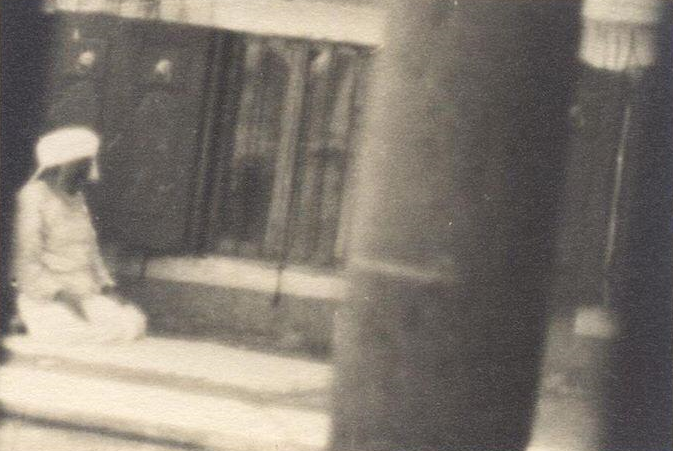
A photo of Imam Yahya praying, taken by Zeki Kiram presumably without Yahya's knowledge, during Kiram's stay at the palace.

Sir Gilbert Clayton, who visited King Yahya in Sanaa in an earnest attempt to win him over in 1925 and during his short stay in the capital, was impressed by this ruler's administration, his military preparedness, and organization.

Lt Col. Harold Jacob, C.S.I. describing him said; "Imam Yahya is a strong ruler. His sanctity as High Priest of the Zaidi sect and his descent from the Prophet's family adds to the prestige which his benign rule has won. His methods are patriarchal and humane. His one hobby is the Yemen"

Jewish chronicles lavish praise upon him and depict him as the champion of justice and compassion. Imam Yahia managed to put an end to the state of anarchy, lawlessness and violence which had lacerated the country and inflicted immense suffering upon its inhabitants, including the Jews. During his long reign the Jews enjoyed relatively favorable conditions and were generally in favour of the Imam.

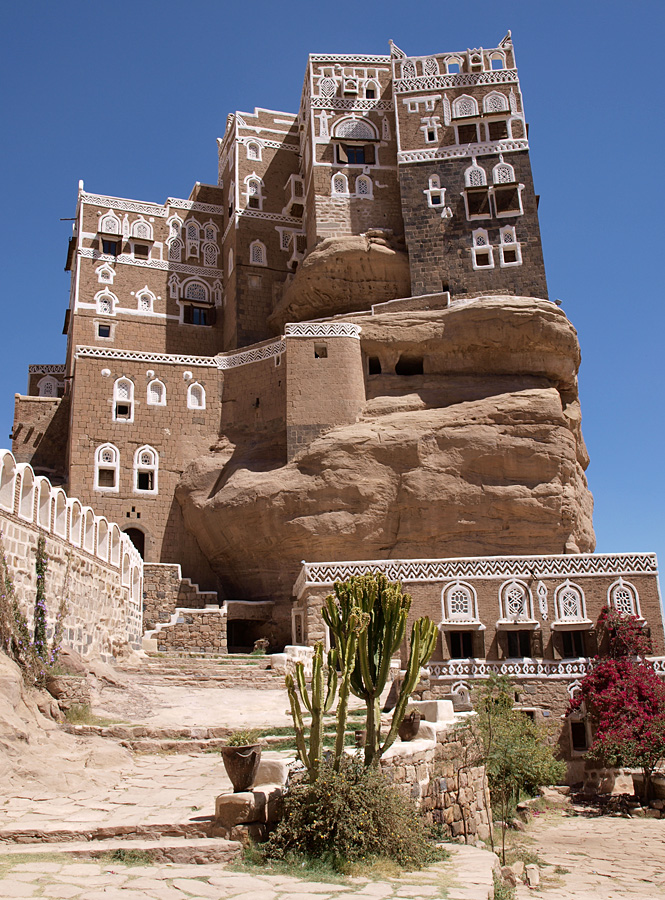
Dar al-Hajar which was the residence of Imam Yahya in Wadi Dhar near Sanaa.

== Policies ==
=== External policies during World War I ===
In 1911 Imam Yahya signed the Treaty of Daan with the Ottomans which recognised his rule over the Zaydi-controlled portions of Yemen.

News of the demise of the Ottoman Empire reached Yemen on Thursday 14 November 1918. Imam Yahya went to Sanaa three days later on Sunday 17 November 1918 to meet with tribal leaders from Hashid, Arhab, Nihm, and Khowlan. He arrived at the residence of the judge and scholar Hussein bin Ali Al Amri and received dignitaries, scholars, Turkish princes, judges, and a flood of subjects who proclaimed him the supreme ruler of all of Yemen.

His first order was to forbid entering the capital Sanaa with arms, and appointed sentries at the gates. Other cities accepted the rule and authority of Imam Yahya; including the port of Mocha and the city of Taiz. He took steps to create a modern state, and maintained all Ottoman officials who would stay to support the development of government.

He created a regular army in 1919 that enlisted soldiers from the surrounding tribes to Sanaa; from the tribes of Sanhan, Bani Harthi, and Bani Hushaish. He signed many treaties which recognised Yemen as a sovereign state, the first of which was the Italo-Yemeni Treaty in 1926.

Due to conflicting tribes in the border areas between Saudi Arabia and Yemen that escalated into a war ensued that was ended in 1934 with the signing of the Taif Treaty between Saudi Arabia and Yemen. The treaty was the basis for the final territorial agreement between both countries concluded during the reign of King Fahd bin Abdulaziz and President Ali Abdullah Saleh.

=== Internal policy ===
From 1934 until his assassination in 1948, Yahya redirected his energies toward internal consolidation of his authority and the creation of a viable central government, answerable to him personally. To this end, control of the hinterland was strengthened by the establishment of a standing army and the naming of his sons as governors of key provinces. Tighter control over affairs in Sanaa, the capital, was assured by expanding the scope of administrative functions and appointing other sons as supervisors of old and new political institutions. The regime sent Yemen's first students abroad: military cadets to Iraq in the 1930s and civilian students, the "Famous Forty," to Lebanon in the late 1940s. An early attempt was made to introduce some direction to the nascent national economy by the establishment of a Yemen trading company. Even with these changes, Yahya's Yemen was a semi-feudal state in which even the most basic measures required his personal approval.

Imam Yahya was largely admired by the Jews of Yemen, who saw him as their patron and protector. Earlier, in 1906, the Jews of Sanaa had come out in full-force to welcome the Imam who returned to the city after the Turks had temporarily left it. However, by 1922, in response to outside pressure, Imam Yahya promulgated an edict that prohibited Yemeni Jewish emigration. Although the ban on emigration remained the official policy of the state until 1949, Jews were able to bypass its policy by secretly going into the British Protectorate of Aden. Throughout the early 1940s, Imam Yahya turned a blind eye to Jewish emigration, neither prohibiting it nor officially permitting it, but rather giving his unspoken consent to the departure of Jews from Sanaa and other central Yemeni settlements. During the Imam's reign, he reinforced an old edict prohibiting Jews from building their houses higher than Muslim houses. The Imam appointed Yihya Yitzhak Halevi as one of four representatives of the Jewish community, responsible for conveying matters of state to his community and collecting the annual Poll-tax, a position which he held until his death. After the Imam's assassination in 1948, the king's emigration policy continued under his son Ahmad.

== Assassination ==
During a short excursion outside of the periphery of Sanaa on 17 February 1948, the Imam's limousine was ambushed by an assassin, during which the Imam Yahya and his grandson were shot and killed, in what became known as the al-Waziri coup. The assassin, known as Ali Nasser Al-Qardaei, was from the Murad tribe.

Upon the knowledge of the murder of Imam Yahya, Yemeni tribes rallied behind Sayf-ul-Islam Ahmad bin Yahya and accepted him as the new Imam of Yemen. The armies surrounded Sanaa under the leadership of Seif Ul Islam Alhassan and Seif Ul Islam Alabbass, both sons of the late Imam, supported by their brother Seif Ul Islam Yahya from within the city walls.

The news shocked both the Arab League, and all Muslim governments. King Abdullah of Jordan compared his death to that of the third Caliph Uthman.

Both King Abdulaziz Ibn Saud of Saudi Arabia, and himself supported Imam Ahmad, and were first to declare him as the new Head of State.

Yemen was a founding member of the Arab League in 1945, and later joined the United Nations in 1947.

In 1946 British opposition to Imam Yahya was led from Aden-based political parties.

He had 14 sons:

== See also ==
- History of Yemen
- Carl Rathjens, orientalist who explored Yemen
- Rada'a

== Notes ==
Yahya Muhammad Hamid ed-Din Rassids Dynasty Cadet branch of the Tabatabaei
Preceded by Muhammad bin Yahya Hamid ad-Din	Imam of Yemen; 1904–1948	Succeeded by Ahmad bin Yahya
New title	King of Yemen; 1918–1948	Succeeded by Ahmad bin Yahya
