= Violet Line (1914) =

British-Ottoman boundary line

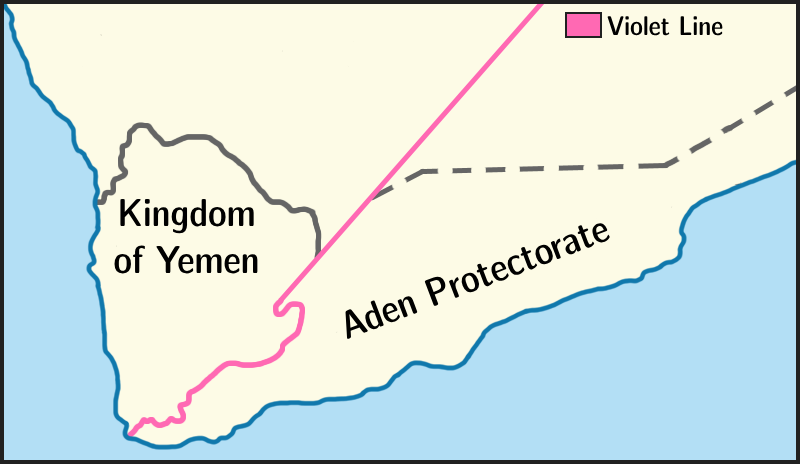
Map showing the 1905 Anglo-Turkish tribal boundaries and the Violet Line.

The Violet Line was a boundary line agreed between the United Kingdom and the Ottoman Empire in March 1914. It started from the termination of the Blue Line agreed to at the Anglo-Ottoman Convention of 1913 and extended to the border between the Ottoman Yemen Vilayet and the British Aden Protectorates.

Specifically, the line went north-east (at 45°) from the village of Lakamat Al Ash’ub (13.827888°N 44.754798°E) and began where it intersected with the previously agreed tribal boundary in 1905. It then continued until it met the Blue Line at the 20th parallel. Together with the Blue Line, the Violet Line effectively divided the Arabian peninsula in two. This boundary between the Ottoman and British empires is what eventually led to the border between North Yemen and South Yemen.
