= Yahya Muhammad al-Wareeth =

Yemeni imam

Yahya Muhammad al-Wareeth (Arabic: يحيى محمد الوريث) was an imam of the Mutawakkilite Kingdom of Yemen. He was one of the last to rule before the Mutawakkilites were overthrown in the 1960s. His descendants, after the revolution, now reside chiefly in Egypt, Jordan, and Yemen as local aristocrats.
