= Flag of South Yemen =

Flag used from 1967–1990 and again in 1994

South Yemen
- Use: Historical
- Proportion: 2:3
- Adopted: November 30, 1967; 58 years ago
- Relinquished: May 22, 1990; 36 years ago (Yemeni unification)
- Design: A horizontal tricolour of red, white, and black with a sky-blue triangle with a tilted red star (the symbol of the Yemeni Socialist Party) at the hoist.

The Flag of South Yemen consisted of a tricolour of three equal horizontal red, white, and black bands of the National Front flag with a sky-blue triangle containing a tilted red star at the hoist. The red star represented the leadership of the party, the National Front, which later became the Yemeni Socialist Party.

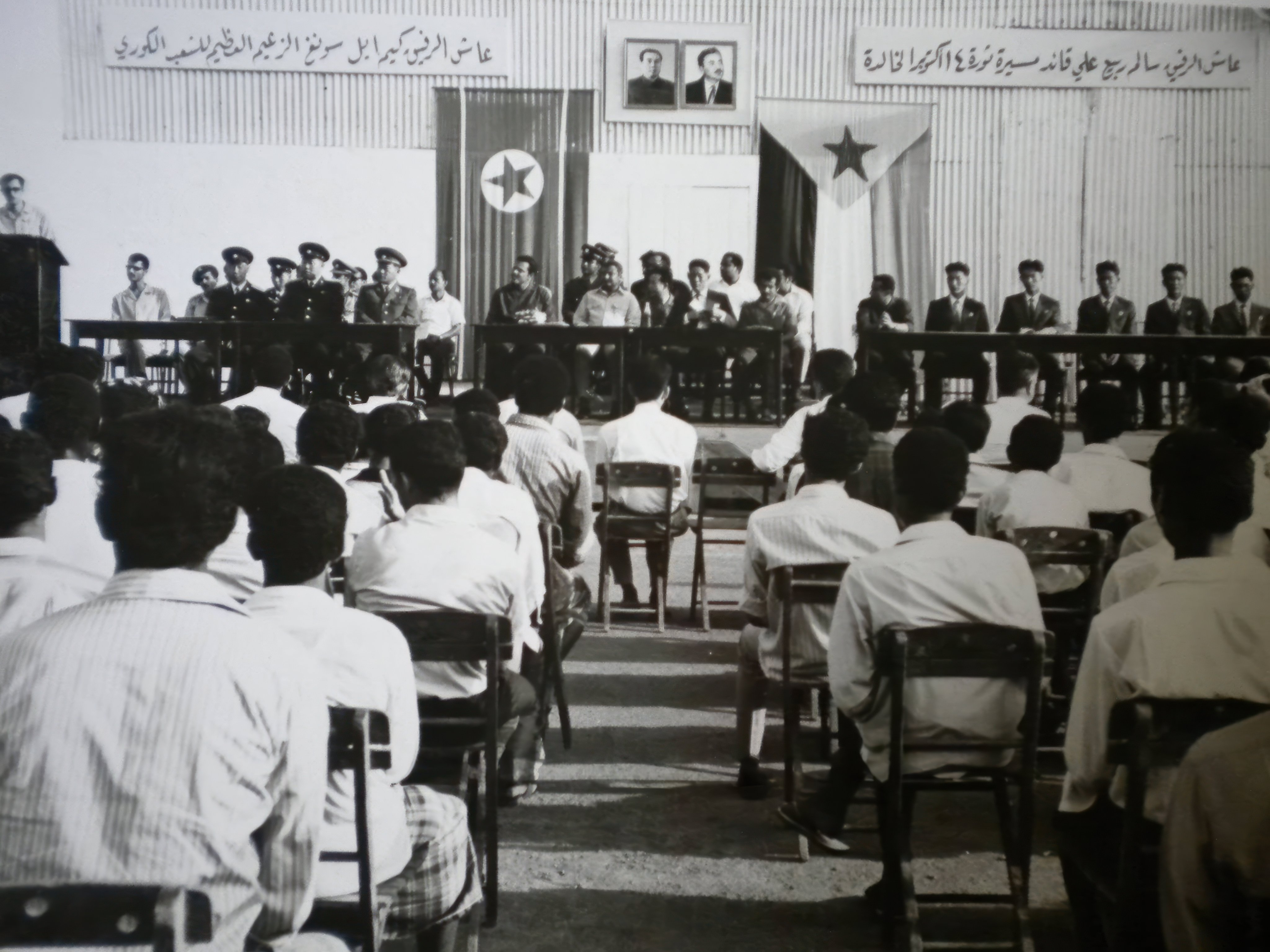
Vertical flags of PDR Yemen and DPR Korea

The flag was adopted on 30 November 1967 when South Yemen declared independence from the United Kingdom until the Yemeni unification in 1990. The flag of South Yemen was the only flag from the Arab Liberation Flag family to feature the color blue.

== Color scheme ==
Scheme	Sky blue	Red	White	Black
Hex triplet	#80C3E6	#CE1126	#FFFFFF	#000000
RGB	128–195–230	206–17–38	255–255–255	0–0–0

== Gallery ==
Presidential standard of South Yemen

Flag of the Yemeni Socialist Party

Flag of South Yemen, vertical standard

== See also ==
- Flag of Yemen
- Flag of the Kingdom of Yemen
- Emblem of Yemen
- Pan-Arabism
- Pan-Arab colors
