= Kingdom of Yemen =

Kingdom in northwestern Yemen (1918–1970)

Mutawakkilite Kingdom of Yemen المملكة المتوكلية اليمنية (Arabic) al-Mamlakah al-Mutawakkilīyah al-Yamanīyah
- 1918–1970
- Flag (1927–1970) Coat of arms
- Anthem: "Royal Salute" (تحية ملكية)
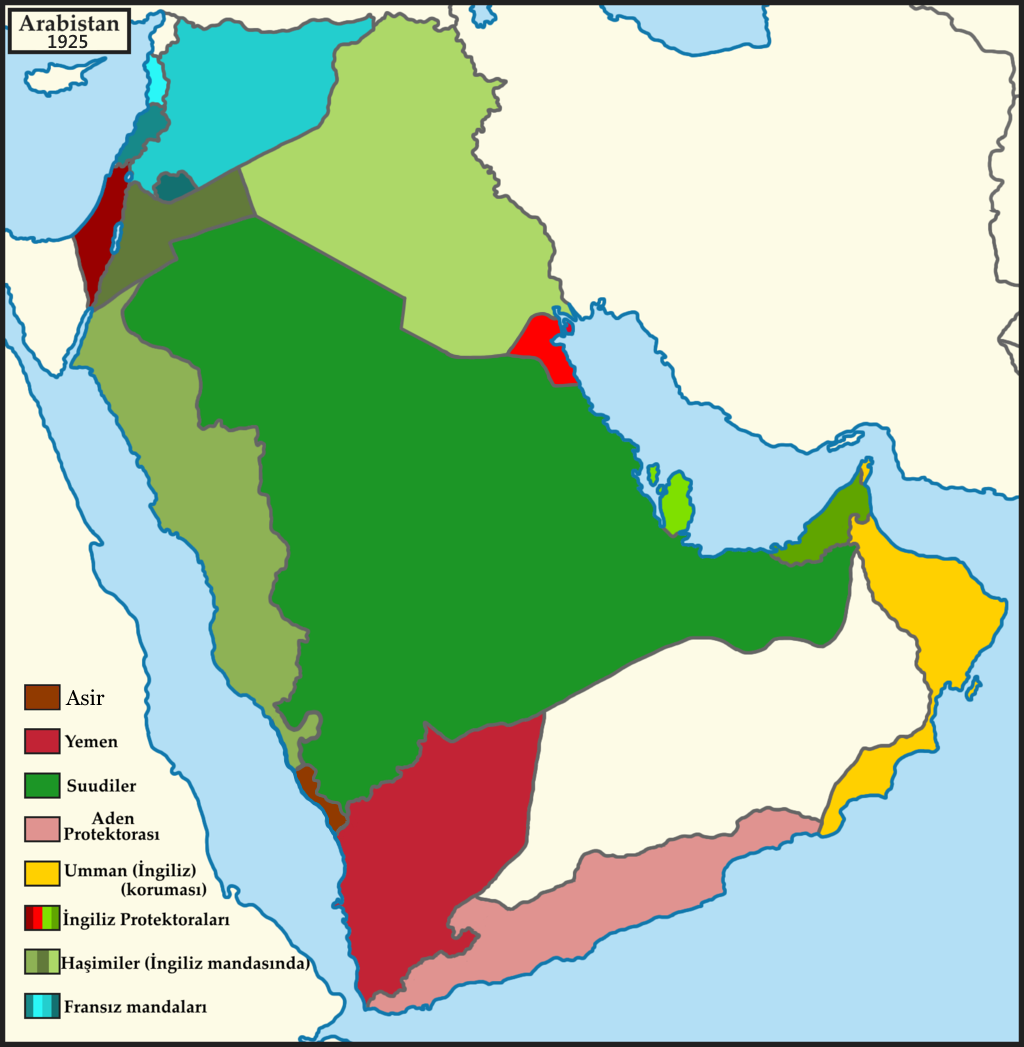
- Status: Member of the United Arab States (1958–1961)
- Capital: Sanaa (1918–1948); Taiz (1948–1962)
- Common languages: Arabic
- Religion: Zaydi Islam (official); Sunni Islam; Judaism
- Government: Islamic absolute monarchy
- King-Imam
  - 1918–1948: Yahya Hamid ed-Din
  - 1948–1962: Ahmad bin Yahya
  - 1962–1970: Muhammad al-Badr
- History
  - Independence from the Ottoman Empire: 30 October 1918
  - 26 September Revolution: 26 September 1962
  - Monarchy abolished: 1 December 1970
- Currency: North Yemeni rial
- Time zone: UTC+3
- Calling code: 967
Preceded by
Yemen Vilayet
Emirate of Asir
Baidah Sultanate
Succeeded by
Yemen Arab Republic
Saudi Arabia
- Today part of: Yemen; Saudi Arabia

The Kingdom of Yemen (Arabic: المملكة اليمنية, romanized: al-Mamlakah al-Yamanīyah), officially the Mutawakkilite Kingdom of Yemen (Arabic: المملكة المتوكلية اليمنية, romanized: al-Mamlakah al-Mutawakkilīyah al-Yamanīyah) and also known simply as Yemen or, retrospectively, as North Yemen, was a state that existed between 1918 and 1970 in the northwestern part of the modern country of Yemen. Located in the Middle East, it was bordered by Saudi Arabia to the north, the Aden Protectorate to the south, and the Red Sea to the west. Its capital was Sanaa from 1918 to 1948, then Taiz from 1948 to 1962. Yemen was admitted to the United Nations on 30 September 1947. A republican coup was launched against the government in 1962, leading to the North Yemen Civil War. The royalist government only controlled the northern portions of the country from 1962 to 1970, until a peace deal in 1970 saw it largely dissolved.

Three days after the Ottoman Empire's decision to withdraw from Yemen following the 1918 Armistice of Mudros, Imam Yahya, the religious leader of the region, entered Sana'a and declared himself the ruler of Yemen. After declaring his rule, he launched attacks on Aden, which was under the auspices of the British Empire, but the British repelled the attacks. He then suppressed the rebellions of the tribes in Southern Tihama, advanced towards the Emirate of Asir, and increased his legitimacy by making agreements with the Kingdom of Italy and the Soviet Union. In 1927, he again attacked the countries under the auspices of the British Empire, and these attacks also failed. In 1934, he signed a friendship treaty with the United Kingdom, promising not to attack Aden in exchange for border negotiations. The Saudi-Yemeni war broke out because he did not accept to surrender the Emir of Asir, who was loyal to Saudi Arabia at that time and rebelled. Four months later, Yemen made peace by giving Jizan, Najran, and Asir to Saudi Arabia. After this war, the Kingdom of Yemen began to pursue an isolationist policy.

While Imam Yahya enjoyed legitimacy among the Zaydi tribes in the northern areas, the Sunni population in the coastal and southern regions was less inclined to accept his rule. To maintain power, he maintained authoritarian rule and appointed his sons to rule various provinces. Therefore, as a result of the growing discontent, Imam Yahya was assassinated in 1948 by revolutionaries who wanted to establish a constitutional government, but his son Ahmad bin Yahya, who was the crown prince at the time, seized power with the help of loyal Zaydi tribes. In 1958, Ahmed bin Yahya joined the United Arab States under pressure from Egyptian president Gamal Abdel Nasser. However, when Syria left the union in 1961, Yemen also left the union. After the death of Ahmed bin Yahya, one week after his son Muhammad al-Badr came to power, the soldiers under the leadership of Abdullah al-Sallal, supported by Egypt, staged a coup and established the Yemen Arab Republic. Al-Badr fled to the mountains and started a civil war with the help of Zaydi tribes. Saudi Arabia supported al-Badr, while Egypt sent troops to support al-Sallal. After Egypt's defeat by Israel in 1967, negotiations began between royalists and republicans for a ceasefire, and in 1970, the Mutawakkilite Kingdom of Yemen was officially dissolved in exchange for royalists having influence in the government.

The Mutawakkilite Kingdom of Yemen was under an absolute monarchy. The country did not have an official language, although the majority of the population spoke Arabic, with a minority speaking Yemenite Hebrew. Of the country, 90% were Arabs, ~10% were Afro-Arabs, and a small portion were Yemeni Jews before Operation Magic Carpet (1949–1950) evacuated most of the Yemeni Jews to the new state of Israel. The population was ~55% Zaydi Muslim, ~45% Sunni Muslim, and a small portion was historically Jewish.

== Etymology ==
There are various sources about the etymology of Yemen. The term Yamnat is used in ancient South Arabian inscriptions to refer to the second Himyarite king. It is mentioned in the title of Shammar Yahrish. This term probably refers to the coastline between Aden and Hadhramaut. Historically, Yemen encompassed a larger region stretching from northern Asir in Saudi Arabia to Dhufar in southern Oman. This region is called Greater Yemen.

It is claimed that Yemen is derived from the Arabic name al-yamin (Arabic: اليمين, lit. 'Right') because Yemen is located to the south of the Mecca's Kaaba, that is, to its right according to maps, when turning towards the east of Mecca, which is considered the center of the world according to Islamic geographers. Other sources claim that Yemen comes from the root yamn or yumn, meaning happiness or blessed.

While the rest of Arabia was called Arabia Deserta, the southwest corner of the peninsula was called Arabia Eudaimon (Greek: Εὐδαίμων Ἀραβία, romanized: Evdaímon Áravía) by the Hellenistic Greeks and Arabia Felix by Roman geographers, both meaning "Fertile/Fortunate Arabia", due to its higher rainfall. In Arabic, Yemen was called as-Sa'id (Arabic: اليمن السعيد, lit. 'Happy Yemen').

== History ==
=== Background ===
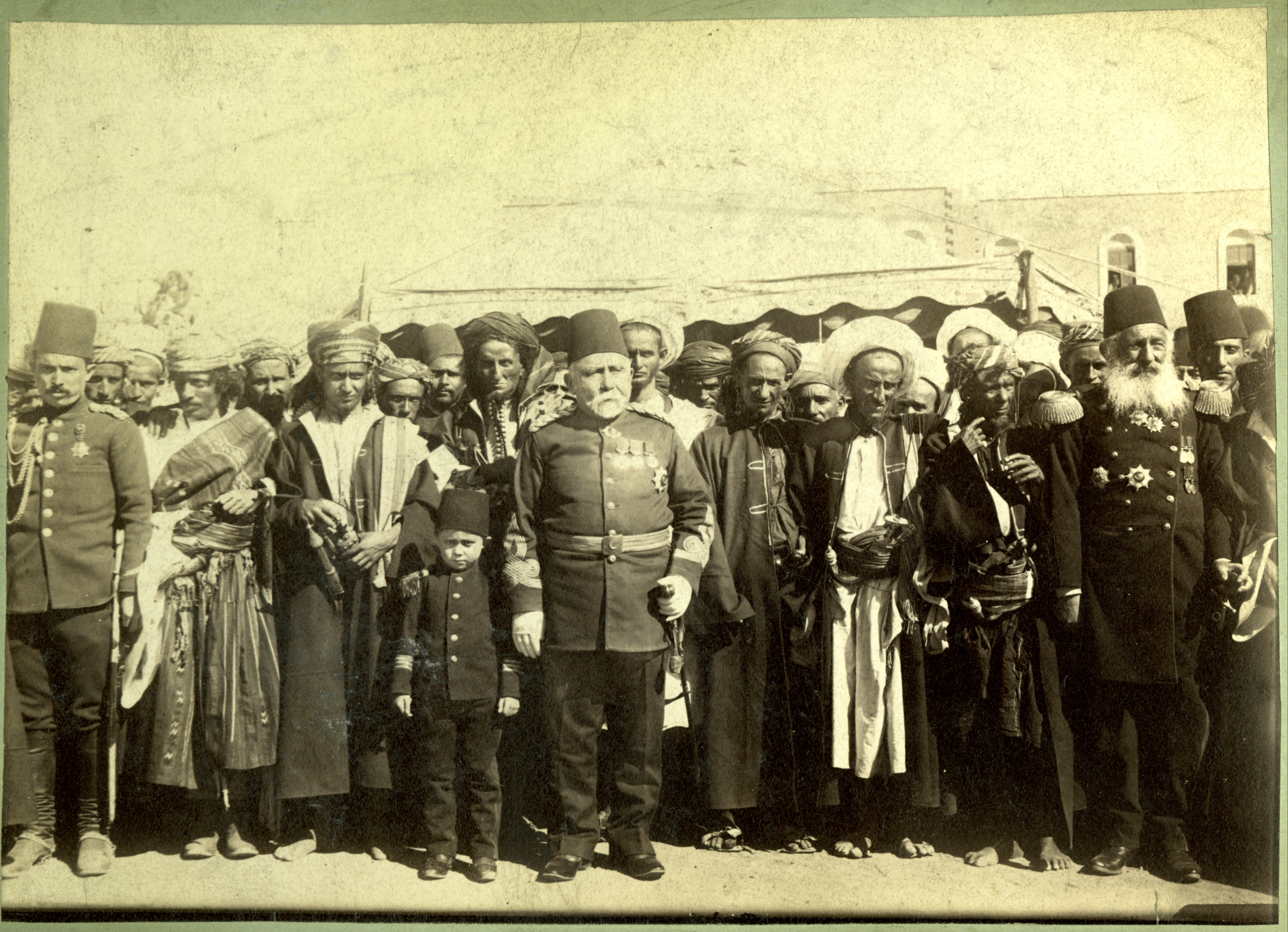
Ottoman soldiers with Yemeni locals

In 1849, the Ottoman Empire conquered the Tihama region in order for the Zaydi imam to recognize Ottoman sovereignty and allow Ottoman forces to deploy to Sana'a. Ahmed Muhtar Pasha, with the Fırka-i İhtiyâtiyye Army to which he was assigned after eliminating Muhammed Âiz in Asir, re-established the Ottoman authority in Yemen by taking Sana'a, the most important city of Yemen, during the governorship of Yemen to which he was appointed in 1872. Ahmed Pasha not only established authority but also initiated construction works in Yemen. In addition to a castle, a mosque, and an imaret, he had a printing house established in San'a, and a telegraph line was laid between San'a and Hudaydah. However, the Zaydis, who wanted their imams to rule Yemen, rebelled in 1889 because the Ottoman officials serving in the region were involved in corruption in administrative affairs. Hejaz Governor Ahmed Feyzi Pasha, who was assigned to suppress the rebellion from Hudaydah, advanced to Sana'a and Taiz and suppressed the rebellion in a short time. Not only was it difficult to suppress the rebellions in Yemen, but the poverty of the Yemeni people increased because reforms could not be made because they were costly to the Ottoman Empire. Since the discontent of the people could not be resolved, they rebelled even more. Abdul Hamid II made some reforms to eliminate the authority of Imam Yahya, eased the tax burden of the poor in Yemen, and built schools. He tried to put an end to the rebellions by appointing officers who spoke Arabic to Yemen, after the rebellions of 1882, 1896, 1902, 1904 and 1910. Shortly before World War I, in 1913, the Ottoman Empire was forced to cede some authority to Imam Yahya, who was officially the Zaydi imam. In return, Imam Yahya promised that he would not cooperate with Seyyid Idrisi against the Ottoman Empire. Then, along with World War I, many wars took place in Yemen.

=== Imam Yahya period (1918–1948) ===
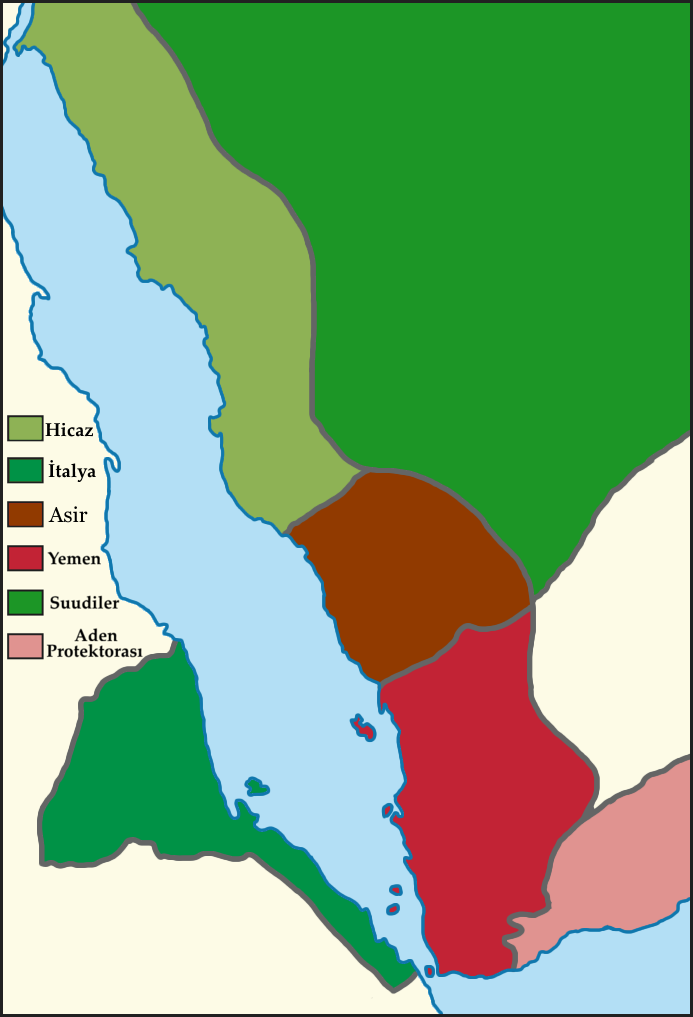
Yemen in 1919

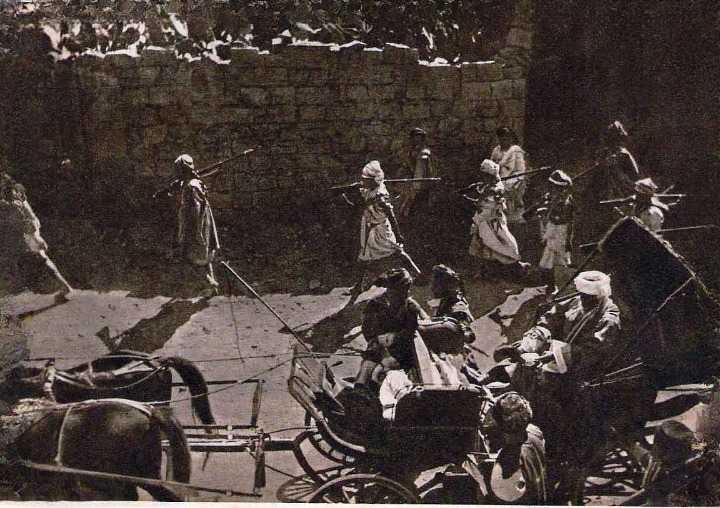
Imam Yahya and his troops in Sana'a

As the fronts turned into a stalemate in the First World War, Imam Yahya, the Zaydi imam of the time, became worried about what would happen to himself and Yemen. In order to avoid any harm to himself, Imam Yahya began to think of leaving Lahij to the British and asking for the opening of sea lanes and the stopping of British and Seyyid Idrisi attacks in return. On 30 October 1918, he signed the Mudros Armistice of the Ottoman Empire. After this situation, Imam Yahya entered Sana'a and declared the independence of Yemen, and 3 days after independence, Imam Yahya declared himself the ruler of the Zaydi Emirate of Yemen. According to the armistice, the Ottoman Empire was to withdraw from all of Yemen, but the governor of the city, Mahmut Nedim Bey, and the commander of the 40th Division, Galib Bey, did not comply with this order for 45 days. Corps Commander Ahmet Tevfik Pasha paid a small amount of the soldiers' overdue salaries from the Provincial coffers. Imam Yahya stated that he would not object if the corps decided to surrender the Corps units, and he requested that some of the weapons and ammunition in the troops be given to him as a precaution against possible attacks in the future, but some commanders objected to this. Taiz Operations Regional Commander Ali Sait Pasha took the initiative and went to Aden and met with the British. Since Ahmet Tevfik Pasha took the time to evacuate Yemen, the British ordered VII. The corps and Yahya's delegation sat at the table with the British, but no result came out of this negotiation. The resistance continued for 1 more month, then VII. The Corps and the 40th Division handed over most of their ammunition to Imam Yahya and sold the rest to the tribes to provide subsistence to the soldiers. On January 23, 1919, the last Ottoman force surrendered to the British. Although most of the officers had left, Mahmud Nedim Bey and 200 Ottoman officers were still detained by Imam Yahya in Sana'a. The civil servants who stayed in Yemen repeatedly wrote letters to the governments of Istanbul and Ankara for the payment of their salaries until the Treaty of Lausanne was signed. In a letter dated 13 October 1923, he stated that it was appropriate and necessary for the Yemenis to establish their own administration, that it was not possible to meet the financial demands, but that the necessary experts or civil servants were needed for organization. It was written that Turkey could help, provided that their salaries were paid by the Yemeni administration. They held important positions such as Mahmut Nedim the governor of Sana'a and Ragıp Pasha the minister of foreign affairs. Imam Yahya wanted Mahmud Nedim Bey, whose official duty ended after the Treaty of Lausanne, to stay in Yemen. However, Mahmud Nedim Bey returned to Turkey in 1924. Then he tried to bring the remaining Turks to Turkey. In 1926, some civil servants returned to Turkey. The Turks who remained in Yemen intermarried with the locals, and most of them were later presumed dead by those in Turkey.

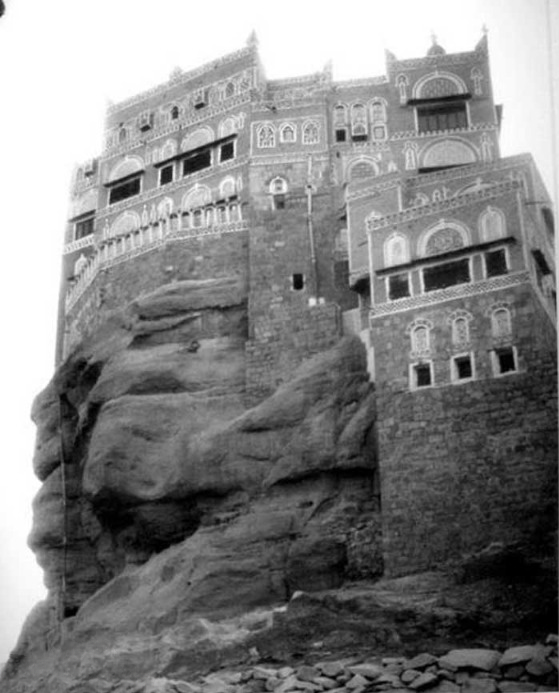
Dar al Hajar, the Imam's royal residence

Imam Yahya wanted to realize the Greater Yemen ideal from the Kasimid period. That's why he declared that he did not recognize the Violet Line determined by the Ottoman Empire and England in March 1914 and Greater Yemen began to advance towards the British-controlled Aden Protectorate in 1919 to realize its ideal, but the Yemenis retreated with the counter-attack of the British army. Coming after the retreating army of Imam Yahya The British army also occupied the port of al-Hudaydah and handed it over to Asir Emirate. After the loss of Hudaydah, Imam Yahya attacked Aden again in 1922 and advanced to within 50 km of Aden, at this juncture however his forces came under heavy attack by the British Air Force and thus Imam Yahya's army was compelled to retreat back to the highlands.

In order to gain more control over the tribes in Yemen, he waged war against the rebellious Hashid and Bakil tribes in 1922. Since Imam Yahya knew about the brutality of Crown Prince Ahmed bin Yahya, he appointed him as a commander in the rebellions. After many clashes between the Hashid bandits and the Victorious Army, the Hashid tribe was defeated. By order of Prince Ahmed bin Yahya, the army plundered the Hashid tribe and raped many people. After this incident, Imam Yahya ordered the Crown Prince Ahmed bin Yahya to arrest the chiefs and sheikhs of the Hashid tribes, collect the captives, and also ask the Hashid tribe to cover the war damages. He ordered him to collect a small amount of taxes and to demolish the houses of those who refused. The arrested Hashid sheikhs and tribal leaders were sent to Ghamdan prison. Everyone except the children was tortured and killed.

In 1924, al-Jawf and Bayda tribes rebelled. Thereupon, Imam Yahya sent the New Army led by Sayyid Abdullah al-Wazir to suppress the rebellion. After establishing his authority over the tribes, Imam Yahya, who wanted to benefit from the struggle for the throne that emerged in the Emirate of Asir after the death of Muhammad ibn Ali al-Idrisi in 1923, captured Hudaydah with troops consisting of tribal members, most of whom were from the Hashid tribe. A number of shrines, considered saints by the inhabitants of Hudaydah, were destroyed by Imam Yahya's army during these conflicts. While Hudaydah was captured, al-Jawf tribes rebelled, and the rebellion ended after a short conflict. Then he headed towards Sabya and besieged al-Idrisi's son Ali bin Idrisi. In 1926, the Imam's army raided tribes that did not recognize him in Jizan and Najran Ali bin Idrisi pledged his allegiance to Imam Yahya on condition that he recognized him as the ruler of Southern Asir But Imam Yahya rejected this offer, claiming that the Idrisis were of Moroccan origin. According to Imam Yahya, along with the British, the Idrisians were nothing but intruders and had to be permanently expelled from Yemen. This policy was negotiated with the United Kingdom and the Kingdom of Hejaz and Nejd under their pressure. caused him to have problems. In 1926, a dispute broke out between the Kingdom of Hejaz and Nejd and Yemen over the territorial sharing of Najran.

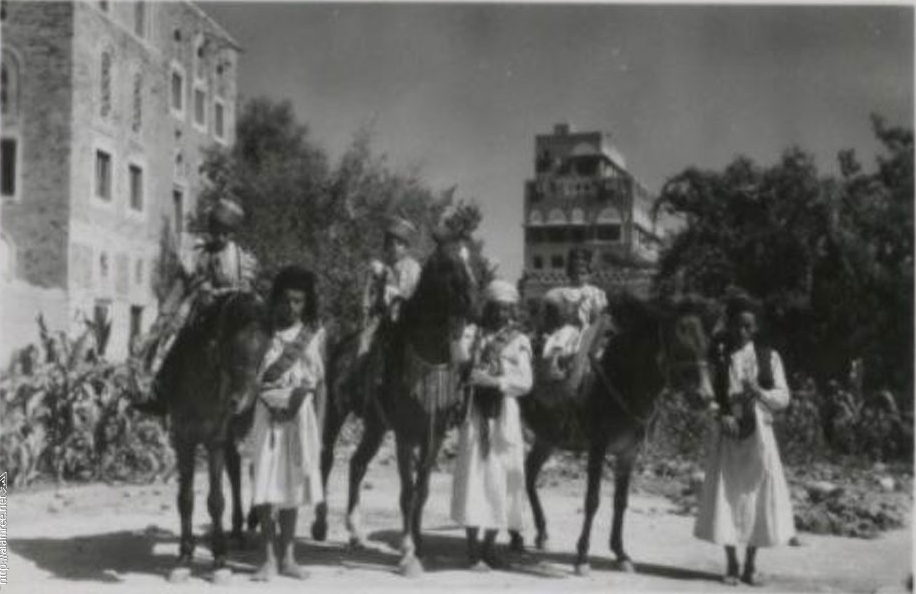
Imam Yahya's children, 1930s

Imam Yahya entered ed-Dali in 1927 to pressure the British in South Yemen and announce that he did not recognize the Violet Line drawn on land that did not belong to them between the two occupying powers. (Note: refers to the Ottoman Empire and the United Kingdom.) He began raiding the Aden Protectorate. In response, the British began bombing Yemen, particularly Taiz and Ibb. Yemen was unable to respond and suffered heavy losses because it had no air force or air defense system. Therefore, the Imam was forced to stop the raids. Later, Ali Nasir al-Kardey set out with a tribal alliance to capture Shabwa, which remained south of the Violet Line. The tribes submitted to Imam Yahya without a fight. After the tribes in Shabwa came under the Imam's control, the British began bombing the tribes in Shabwa. The main reason for bombing the tribes was to undermine the Imam's already shaky authority further.

With the Italo-Yemeni Treaty signed in 1926, Italy became the first country to recognize Imam Yahya as the king of all Yemen. Thus, the Imam is especially important in Arab geography.

==== Saudi-Yemeni War ====
Display of the war on the map Kingdom of Yemen Saudi Arabia

The Idrisis rebelled against Saudi Arabia and Saudi Arabia soon suppressed the rebellion. Emir Idrisi took refuge in Yemen. That's why Yemen-Saudi Arabia relations began to become tense. Imam Yahya did not comply with the agreement and attacked Najran. Imam Yahya demanded that the administration in Asir be left to al-Idrisi. When an agreement could not be reached with the ambassadors sent by Saudi Arabia, the ambassadors were imprisoned.

The United Kingdom signed friendship treaties with both sides to remain neutral but still provided aircraft and weapons aid to Saudi Arabia before the war. The British maintained Yemen's independence for forty years. Although Imam Yahya did not accept the Violet line, he promised not to attack Aden in exchange for border negotiations.

In March 1934, Abdulaziz ibn Saud ordered his son Prince Saud to occupy the shadow of Tihama and al-Hudaydah. On 20 March 1934, Saudi Arabia officially declared war on Yemen. Thus began the Saudi-Yemen War. In the war, Yemen had an army of 37,000, and the Saudis had an army of 30,000. At the beginning of the war, the Saudis advanced rapidly and captured Hajara and Najran on 7 and 21 April, respectively. In May 1934, bypassing the Yemen Mountains, they captured al-Hudaydah. After capturing it, they began to plunder the city. When they threatened to plunder the traders from the Dominion of India, they gave up plundering when soldiers from the Royal Navy arrived to restore order. Famine began to occur in Sana'a. The imam denied rumors that his son was killed while escaping.

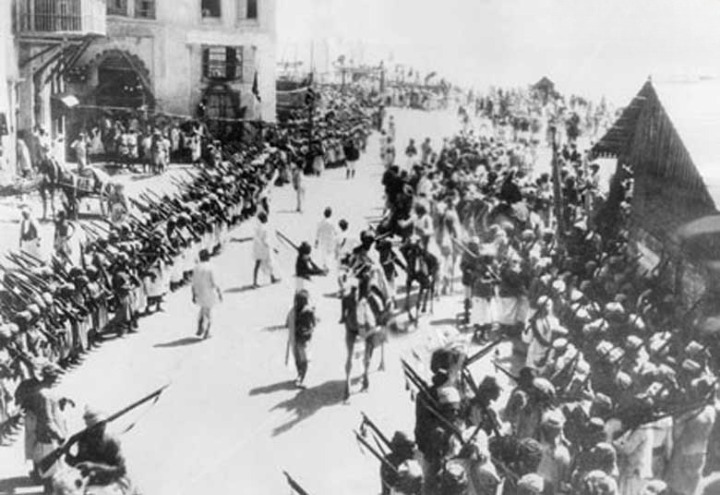
Hudeidia, 1934

Yemen was stuck in the city of Sana'a. Neither British nor Italian forces were expected to intervene in the region. Ibn Saud demanded the imam's abdication, five-year control of the border region, and the exile of the former Emir of Asir from Yemen, but Imam Yahya did not accept. Although the Saudis had better weapons, especially tanks, they did not fall to San because Saudi Arabian soldiers could not adapt to the mountainous region, and Yemeni soldiers were more experienced. Ibn Saud decided to make an agreement with Yemen because he was not in a position to continue the war and there was a possibility of a new Muslim Brotherhood rebellion. On 12 May 1934, peace talks started. Ibn Saud claimed that he was not interested in Yemeni lands. He gave up his demand for Imam Yahya's abdication and demanded a 20-year ceasefire. The present-day Yemen-Saudi Arabia border was determined with the Taif Treaty signed on 14 June 1934. Kingdom of Yemen; He had to leave Najran, Asir and Jizan to the Kingdom of Hejaz and Nejd. End Saudi troops left Yemen on 7 July.

Historian Hans Kohn, writing in Foreign Affairs Magazine, noted that some European observers tended to view this conflict as actually a clash of British and Italian interests. He evaluated that although the Saudis have ties with England and Yemen with Italy, ultimately the rivalry between the two emirates will not feed the rivalry between the two countries.

==== Post-war ====
Failure to recognize the southern border of his kingdom with the British Aden Protectorate (later People's Democratic Republic of Yemen) negotiated by Yahya's ulema, despite the Treaty of Friendship at Sana'a, From time to time it caused conflicts with the British. On 15 October 1937, the Italian-Yemeni Treaty was extended.

==== World War II and after ====
Although Imam Yahya was anti-British and close to the Axis powers, he pursued an isolationist policy throughout World War II. In 1943, a major famine occurred in Yemen. Although it was suggested to the Imam that he open the state's reserves, he did not accept it.

In 1944, the poet Muhammad Mahmud Al-Zubayri, nicknamed the "Father of the Revolution" in the North, returned to Yemen from Egypt, but soon fled to the south and founded the Great Yemen Assembly.

In 1945, Yemen became a founding member of the Arab League.

On 4 March 1946, President Harry Truman recognized the Kingdom of Yemen as a sovereign state in a letter to Imam Yahya, the king of Yemen.

When his father, Imam Yahya, fell ill in the city of al-Rawda in 1946, Ibrahim bin Yahya contacted several commanders and tribal leaders and arranged for the Dar Al-Hajar, al-Salalah in the city of Sana'a. He planned to seize power by capturing important points such as the Palace, and arresting his father and brother Ali bin Yahya. He showed his plan to people he trusted, such as the poet Ahmed bin Muhammad al-Shami, but no one supported him. Because he was worried that his plan would go to his father, he faked being sick and started rumors that he was going crazy and having epileptic seizures in order to escape from Yemen. Since doctors could not find a solution, they advised his father to be sent to Ethiopia. They left Yemen with Professor Ahmed al-Burak, who knew English well, to be their translator. After staying in Asmara for a while, they went to the city of Aden and Ibrahim joined the Ahrar Party, which was established against his father's rule.

On 30 September 1947, Yemen joined the United Nations. In the mid-20th century, most Yemeni Jews left Yemen and emigrated to the newly established Israel.

In 1948, nearly 100 members of the Free Yemen Society were arrested for distributing leaflets against authoritarian rule.

A small expeditionary force was sent to the 1948 Arab–Israeli War.

==== Al-Waziri Coup ====
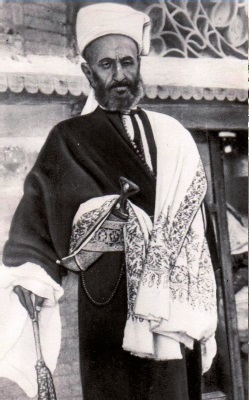
Abdullah Al-Wazir, March 1948

In order to seize power, the Al-Wazirids ambushed Imam Yahya on 17 February 1948 in Savad Hizyaz, south of Sana'a. Ali Kardey's group opened fire on the convoy, which had to stop because of a stone placed in the middle of the road, and Imam Yahya, his grandson and two soldiers were killed. It was said that 50 bullets were found in Imam's body. Then the Al-Waziris appointed Abdullah Al-Wazir to rule the kingdom. Al-Wazir declared constitutionalism and established a provisional Shura Council. There were sixty prominent scholars and jurists in the parliament, led by İbrahim bin Yahya.

The new government was formed, headed by Ali bin Abdullah, who also included Ahmed Muhammad. Numan as the Minister of Agriculture, Sheikh Muhammad Ahmed Numan as the Minister of Internal Affairs, Muhammad Mahmud al-Zubari as the Minister of Education and Judge Abdullah Al-Agbari as the Minister of State, Hussein Abdul Qadir as the Minister of Defense, Servant Galib al-Wajih as the Minister of Finance, Judge Ahmed al-Agbari as the Minister of Education. Carafi took office as Minister of Economy and Mining and Mr. Ahmed al-Mutaa as Minister of Trade and Industry. Prince Ali bin Yahya Hamideddin was appointed as Minister of State and Judge. Hasan al-Omari was appointed Minister of State.

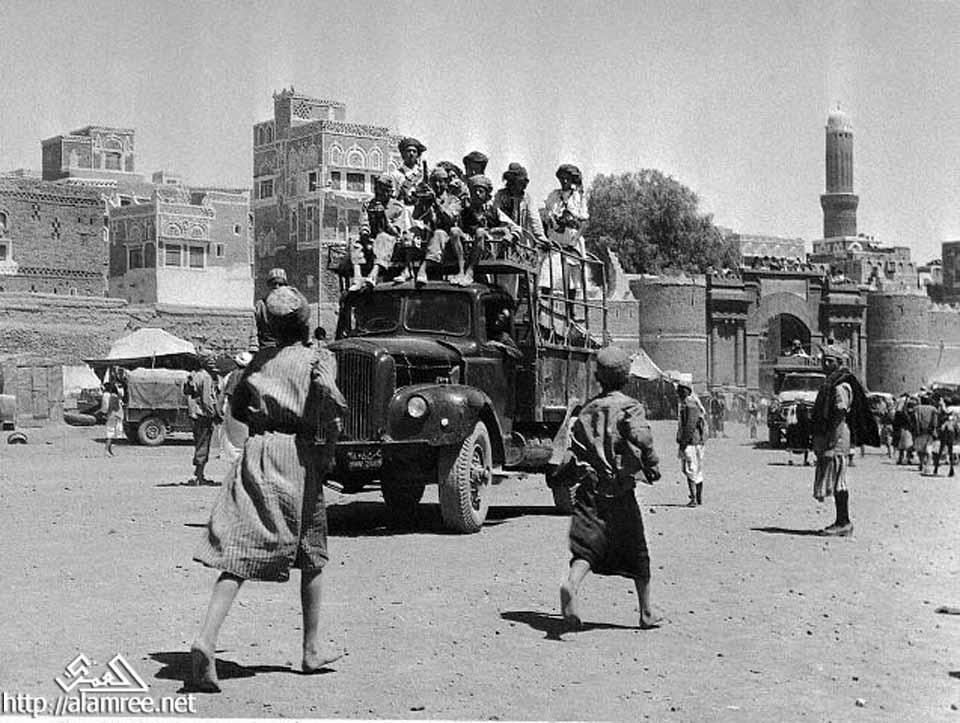
Sana'a, with Bab al-Yaman visible in the background

"Our father, Imam Yahya Hamideddin, passed away. Ahmed al-Wazir was elected imam and I am the chairman of the Council," written by Ibrahim bin Yahya to Cairo newspapers from Aden. The telegram was sent. Abdullah bin Yahya, who was in London at the time of the coup, denied his father's death and added cryptically: "The circumstances are complex and it is understandable that some exaggerated news is coming out of Yemen."

This coup was not welcomed by Arab countries. Especially the Saudis and the remaining Arab kings did not recognize the new government. After the coup, his son Ahmad bin Yahya traveled around North Yemen, gathered the tribes and Saudi Arabia behind him, and besieged Sana'a with the tribes he gathered. He took control of the city a few weeks later. He allowed the tribes he took behind him to plunder the capital. The sack of Sana'a lasted seven days and is assumed to have involved around 250,000 tribesmen. On 8 April 1948, Abdullah al-Wazir was executed by beheading. Approximately 5000 people died during the coup.

According to Professor of Political Science and International Relations Bernard Reich, of George Washington University, Imam Yahya, like his ancestors, could have done better and organized the Zaydi tribes in the northern plateaus against the Turks and British invaders, uniting Yemen and turning it into another cemetery.

=== Ahmed bin Yahya period (1948–1962) ===
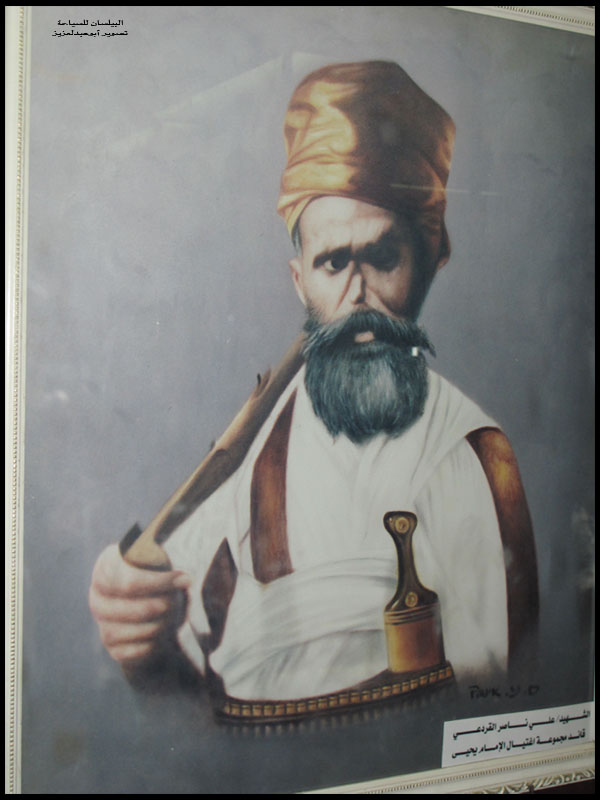
A drawing of Ali Nasser Al-Qardai Al-Muradi. The Zaydi imam, Yahya Hamid Al-Din, wanted to get rid of him, so he forced him into a battle with the English in Shabwa, so Al-Muradi returned and killed the imam in 1948.

After Imam Yahya Muhammad Hamid ed-Din was killed in the coup in 1948, his son Imam Ahmed bin Yahya came to power. His reign was marked by renewed friction with the United Kingdom over the British presence in the south, which stood in the way of its aspirations for increased development, openness and the creation of Greater Yemen. Ahmed bin Yahya was a little more forward-thinking and more open to foreign relations than his father. Yet his regime, like his father's, was autocratic; His approval was required even in the most ordinary situations. Due to Ahmed bin Yahya's strictness and fierceness, the Yemenis described him as Ahmed Ya Jinah (Arabic: أحمد يا جناه) at that time, and because of this trait, his father was the one who appointed him. He gave him the task of suppressing the rebellions – especially in Hashid and Tihame.

Ahmed bin Yahya, like his father Imam Yahya, had the idea of a Greater Yemen. In the 1950s, after refusing to recognize British rule in Southern Arabia, he established a British-Ottoman border that separated Yemen from the Aden Protectorate. A series of border clashes took place along the Violet Line. The British won the conflict.

In 1952, Imam Ahmed banned listening to the radio in public places.

In March 1955, a coup by a group of military officers and two of Ahmed's brothers deposed the king temporarily. However, the coup was quickly suppressed. Ahmed bin Yahya faced increasing pressure from the Egyptian President Gamal Abdel Nasser, who was supported by Arab nationalists and pan-Arabists, and in April 1956 He also signed a mutual defense agreement with Egypt. In March 1958, Yemen joined the United Arab States. However, this confederation disintegrated shortly after Syria withdrew from the United Arab Republic in September 1961 and from the United Arab States in December 1961. After these events, relations between Yemen and Egypt deteriorated.

In 1959, the Soviet Red Cross and Red Crescent Society sent 10,000 tons of wheat to help Yemen overcome the effects of drought.

=== North Yemen Civil War (1962–1970) ===
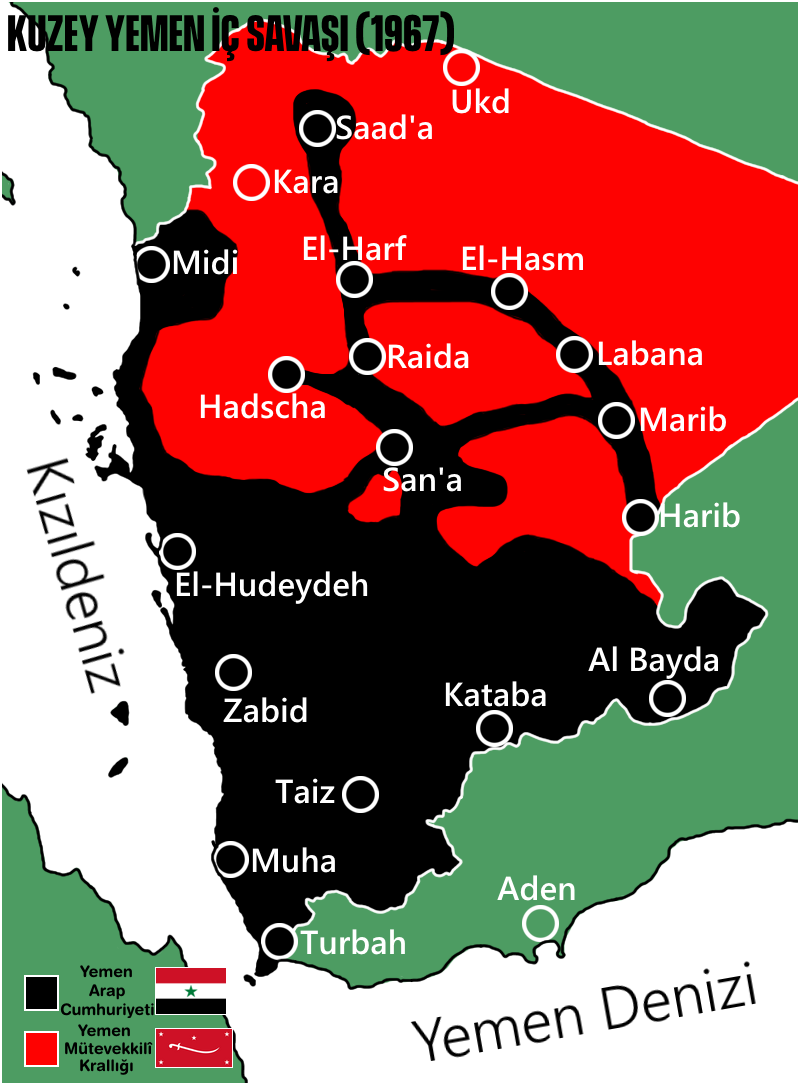
State of the war in 1967

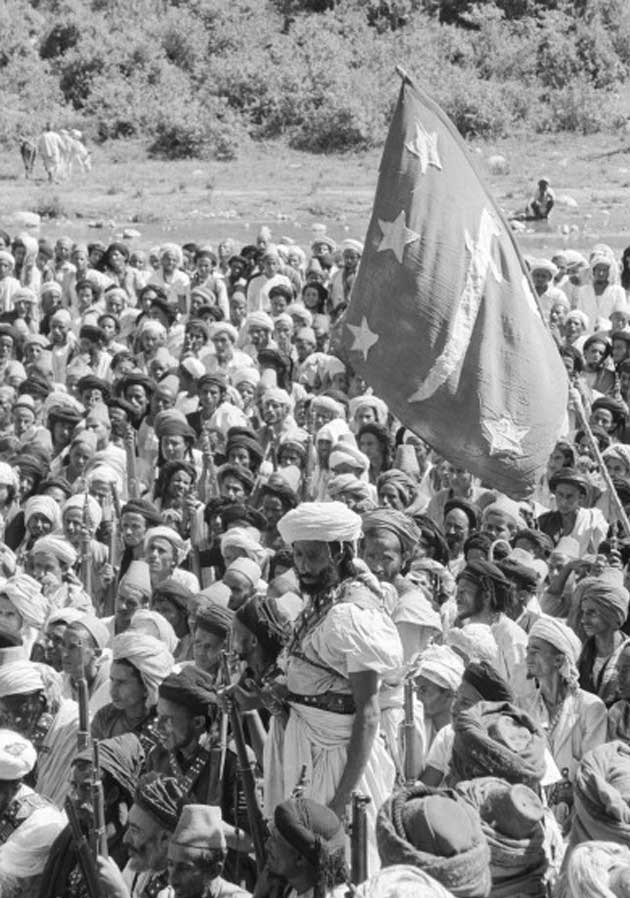
A royalist camp in Yemen in 1962

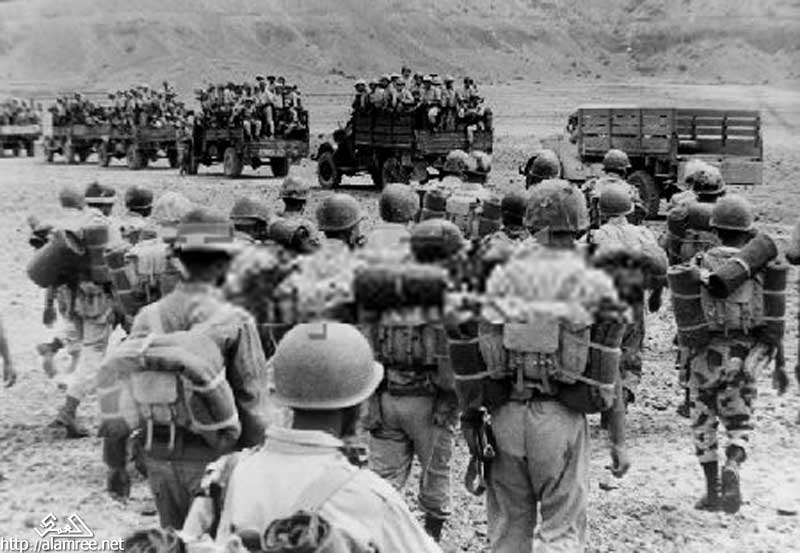
Expeditionary Egyptian Troops in the North Yemen Civil War

Imam Ahmed died in September 1962 and was succeeded by his son Muhammad al-Badr. Inspired by Nasser's Free Officers movement, Egyptian-trained officers led by the commander of the royal guard, Abdullah al-Sallal, deposed Muhammad al-Badr the year he came to power, took control of Sanaa, and founded the Yemen Arab Republic. This incident sparked the North Yemen Civil War. The Imam then fled to the Saudi Arabia border and launched a counter-attack with the support of the Zaidi tribes in the north to regain control, which soon escalated the civil war.

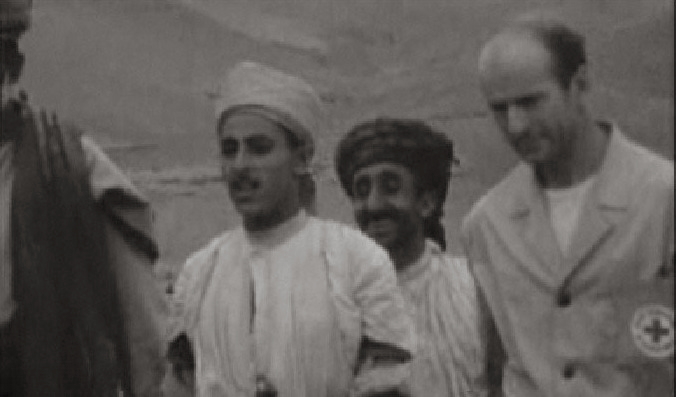
Red Cross delegate Andre Rocher with Prince Abdullah bin Al-Hassan

Soviets recognized the Yemen Arab Republic immediately after these events, on 29 September 1962. Saudi Arabia and Jordan began to support the monarchists. On 5 October 1962, Prince Hassan established a royalist government in exile in Jeddah, Saudi Arabia. There were 55,000 Egyptian soldiers and 3,000 Republicans against the Kingdom Army of 40,447 people. Later, as he increased the number of soldiers to 130,000, he accelerated his losses in the Six Day War. The Royalists made an agreement with the Yemeni tribes to reduce the numerical superiority of the Republicans, and by 1965 the Royalists had increased to approximately 220,000 people. Egypt began using chemical weapons in late 1965. On 11 December 1966, two people died, and thirty-five people were injured due to fifteen tear gas bombs. On 5 January 1967, 140 people died, and 130 people were injured in the gas attack on Kitaf village, the headquarters of Prince Hasan bin Yahya. After these events, the United Kingdom and the United States pressured Egypt. Egypt did not accept the allegations and suggested that the reported incidents were probably caused by napalm, not gas. The Red Cross was alarmed and issued a statement expressing concern in Geneva on 2 June. The University of Bern Institute of Forensic Medicine, based on the report of the Red Cross, concluded that the gas was probably halogen derivatives – phosgene, mustard gas, lewisite, chloride or cyanogen bromide. Gas attacks stopped 3 weeks after the Six-Day War. An estimated 1,500 people died and 2,000 were injured due to chemical attacks. Conflicts continued until 1967, when Egyptian troops withdrew. By 1968, after a final royalist siege of Sana'a, an agreement was reached with the Saudis at the Islamic conference in 1970, and the first permanent constitution was adopted on 30 December 1970, consolidating the Republican regime. More than 100,000 people died on both sides during the conflict. Egyptian historians call this civil war "Egypt's Vietnam War" due to the guerrilla warfare tactics used by the monarchists.

==== Instability and decline ====
Imam Yahya was assassinated in an unsuccessful coup d'état in 1948, but his son, Imam Ahmad bin Yahya, regained power several months later. His reign was marked by growing development and openness, as well as renewed friction with the United Kingdom over the British presence in the south, which stood in the way of his aspirations to create a Greater Yemen. Imam Ahmad was slightly more forward-thinking than his father and was more open to foreign contacts. Nonetheless, his regime, like his father's, was autocratic and semi-medieval in character; even the most mundane measures required his personal approval.

In March 1955, a coup by a group of officers and two of Ahmad's brothers briefly deposed the king but was quickly suppressed. Ahmad faced growing pressure, supported by the Arab nationalist and pan-Arabist objectives of the President of Egypt, Gamal Abdel Nasser, and, in April 1956, he signed a mutual defense pact with Egypt. In March 1958, Yemen joined the United Arab Republic (a federation of Egypt and Syria formed in February 1958) in a confederation known as the United Arab States. However, this confederation was dissolved in December 1961, soon after Syria withdrew from the United Arab Republic and the United Arab States in September 1961. Relations between Egypt and Yemen subsequently deteriorated.

Imam Ahmad died in September 1962 and was succeeded by his son, Crown Prince Muhammad al-Badr, whose reign was brief. Egyptian-trained military officers inspired by Nasser and led by the commander of the royal guard, Abdullah as-Sallal, deposed him the same year he was crowned, took control of Sana'a, and created the Yemen Arab Republic (YAR). This sparked the North Yemen Civil War and created a new front in the Arab Cold War, in which Egypt assisted the YAR with troops and supplies to combat forces loyal to the imamate, while the monarchies of Saudi Arabia and Jordan supported Badr's royalist forces in opposing the newly formed republic. Conflict continued periodically until 1967 when Egyptian troops were withdrawn. By 1968, after a final royalist siege of Sana'a, most opposing leaders had reached a reconciliation, and Saudi Arabia recognized the republic in 1970.

== Politics ==
The Mutawakkilite Kingdom of Yemen was a unitary state where an absolute monarchy was implemented. The Zaydis, who were in power, had the understanding of imamate. Because of the understanding of the imamate, Imams of Yemen were interested in politics until the 26 September Revolution. The assembly, consisting of 10 sayyids, elected the imam who would take over after the imam's death. Even during the periods when they were under the Mamluks and the Ottomans, their words were mentioned in Yemen, especially in the mountains of North Yemen, where the Zaydi sect was more concentrated. In 1926, Imam Yahya transitioned to the dynastic principle by appointing his son as crown prince. Thus, the imamship was passed from father to son, rather than to those who met the conditions. This created hostility from some of the Sayyid class, who had an important role in the appointment of the imam in the Zaydi tradition.

=== Foreign relations ===
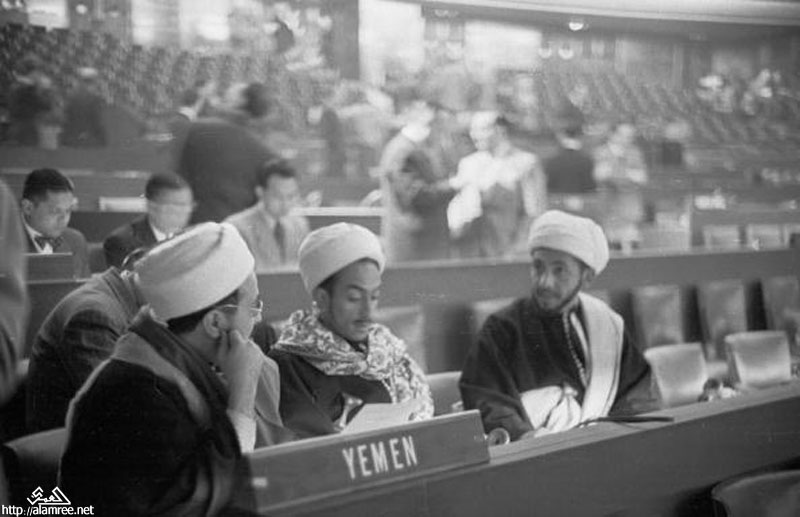
Yemeni diplomats at the United Nations meeting, Paris, 1948

The Mutawakkilite Kingdom of Yemen was a member of international organizations such as the Arab League (1945) and the United Nations (1947). Since South Yemen was under the auspices of the United Kingdom at that time, it represented the whole of Yemen.

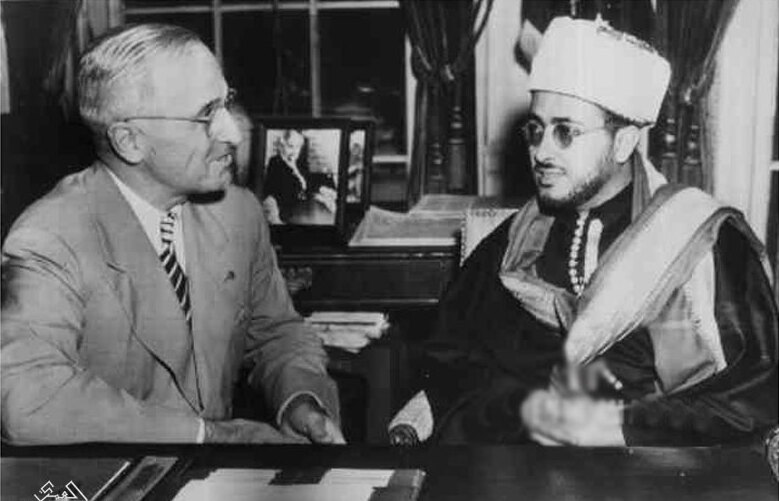
Harry S. Truman talking to Hassan bin Yahya

In line with its power, the Kingdom of Yemen often pursued an isolationist foreign policy. It took steps to strengthen the newly established Yemen and gain international recognition for its state. On 2 September 1926, Yemen was recognized internationally, and diplomatic contacts with the Soviet Union took place in Ankara. Mussolini established a partnership with Imam Yahya by signing the Sana'a Treaty in 1926. Thus, the Kingdom of Italy accepted Imam Yahya as the king of all Yemen. In addition, it provided diplomatic support against Saudi Arabia, which had ambitions over the Kingdom of Yemen. On 15 October 1937, this treaty was extended again. Relations with the Soviet Union also developed by signing the Soviet-Yemen Friendship and Trade Treaty. The northern border was determined by signing the Taif Treaty with Saudi Arabia in 1934, and other relations such as trade were developed. The Taif Treaty would be renewed every 20 years and its validity was confirmed in 1995.

Relations between the United Kingdom, which controlled Aden, and the Kingdom of Yemen, which wanted to control all of Yemen, were generally tense. Even Imam Yahya stated in his letters that "the British", He wrote, "their real desire and main goal is to disintegrate and disperse Islam, so that they can dominate us and make us slaves." was being done. After 1928, the aggressive policies carried out against the British were changed and San'a Friendship Treaty was signed with the United Kingdom. An aggressive attitude towards the United Kingdom was not taken until 1948, after Al-Waziri coup. This attitude changed during the reign of Ahmad bin Yahya, and in the 1950s he declared that he did not recognize the sovereignty of the United Kingdom in Southern Arabia and entered into border conflicts pursuing the concept of Greater Yemen.

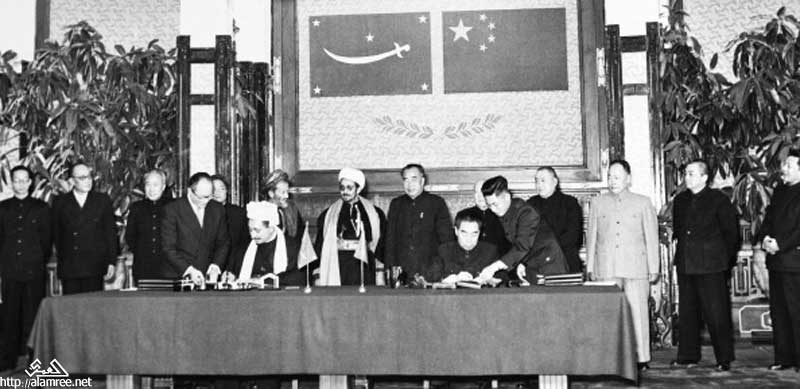
Muhammad al-Badr and the Chinese diplomat signing the Treaty of Friendship and Cooperation, 1958

On 4 March 1946, the president of the United States, Harry Truman, recognized the Kingdom of Yemen as a sovereign state in a letter to Imam Yahya. In addition, relations with the Soviet Union and the People's Republic of China were strengthened. A lot of aid was provided by these countries. A double-header occurred after the 26 September Revolution turned into a civil war. The Soviet Union, the People's Republic of China and Egypt recognized the Yemen Arab Republic, while Saudi Arabia and the United Kingdom recognized the Mutawakkillite Kingdom of Yemen. Since Saudi Arabia provided budgetary support to the royalists, they became dependent on them. At the end of the agreement made in 1970, everyone recognized the Yemen Arab Republic.

=== Administrative divisions ===
The Mutawakkilite Kingdom of Yemen had a unitary structure in terms of administration. Local governments have limited powers. The largest administrative units of the country are liwas (lit. 'Sanjak') and according to the latest regulation, there are 8 livas. These livas are reserved for mikhlaf. The capital of the Mutawakkilite Kingdom of Yemen was San'a until 1948, after which it became Taiz.

The Ottoman Empire left Yemen Eyalet to Imam Yahya in 1918. While Imam Yahya continued the same structure, he made some changes. First, he established the Hajjah sanjak by combining the Hajur district, the es-Sharfin region, Kahlan and Ahnum district. Muhsin bin Nasser, who started a rebellion after capturing Habbur and al-Suda, appointed his eldest son Ahmed bin Yahya as his leader after Shayban. After the Imam's authority spread, Midi and Abs regions were conquered. In 1922, he separated the Qaim and Ibb region from the Taiz sanjak and assigned it to the Dhamar sanjak and connected it directly to Sana'a. Afterward, he turned Saada into a separate sanjak and established the sanjak of "Liwa al-Sham". The Zabid region was attached to the Dhamar sanjak and Abdullah al-Wazir was appointed as its head. When Abdullah al-Wazir left for another job, a separate sanjak was made in 1938 by adding land from the Taiz sanjak to the Imam Yahya Ibb region. He appointed Hassan bin Yahya as his leader. It was added to the sanjak of Ibb by taking a part from Hübeyşiyye and Riyaşiyye mikhlaf from Rada district.

During the reign of Ahmed bin Yahya, he founded the Mahwit sanjak by uniting the Kawkaban, Tavila, Hafaş, and Melhan regions. Finally, Yemen was divided into 8 sanjaks.

1. Liwa of Sana'a
2. Liwa of Dhamar
3. Liwa of Taiz
4. Liwa of Ibb
5. Liwa of Hudaydah
6. Liwa of Al-Mahwit
7. Liwa of Sham (Saada)
8. Liwa of Hajjah

== Army ==
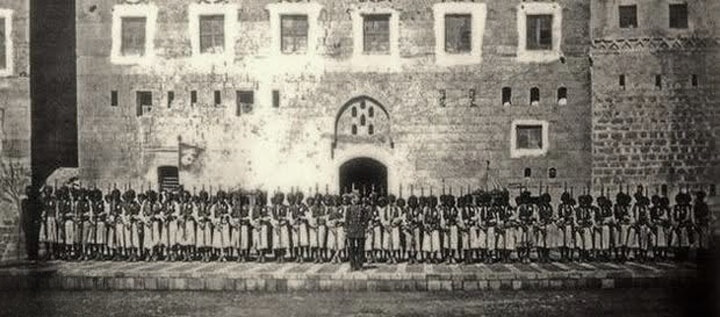
Sana Military School

The Yemeni army consists of two parts: the Ground Forces and the Air Force. While some of the army was paid professional soldiers, the rest were tribal soldiers called in during wartime.

Before Yemen became independent, it had the authority to govern the tribes thanks to the prestige of the Imams, but these troops were not regular. The first regular Yemeni army dates back to the late 19th century, when the Ottoman Empire began recruiting tribal soldiers to form four gendarmerie battalions and three cavalry regiments.

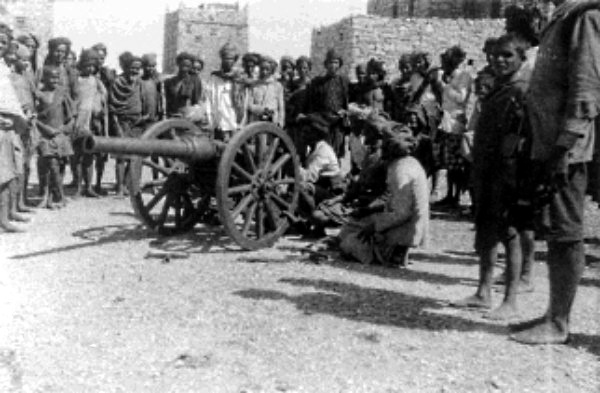
A Yemen cannon in the 1920s

After the Ottoman Empire withdrew from Yemeni territory and Imam Yahya had full control in Yemen, Yemeni brigades in the Ottoman Empire, including the Taiz Brigade at first, began to side with Imam Yahya. Remnants of the Ottoman period Knowing that the Yemeni Brigades would not be enough to defend Yemen in the Arabian Peninsula, Imam Yahya increased the size of his army. 8 brigades were established: Sana'a, Dhamar, Taiz, Ibb, Hudaydah, Al Mahwit, Liwa al Sham (Saada) and Hajjah.

=== Land Forces ===
Since the Kingdom of Yemen was a relatively small country, and after the Ottoman withdrawal from Yemen in 1918, a lot of confusion occurred due to attempts to reform and develop the army without having a sufficient level of officers and doctrine. Theoretical rather than practical aspects dominated the training, and some officers were promoted based on their closeness to Imam Yahya, not on their intelligence or education. It caused a flaw in education because some of them tried to give military training even though they had no military experience.

Although it is complicated, Imam Yahya had a large army compared to his region due to his military experience and authority in the region. The Land Army is divided into 5 branches.

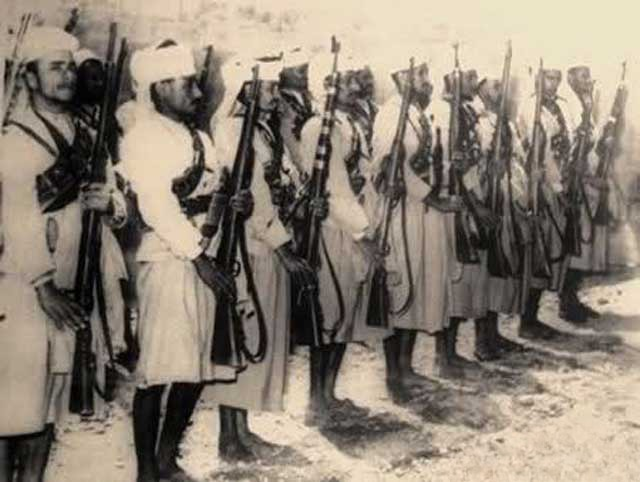
Ukfa Troops

- Imamate Guards (Ukfa troops): These were military units assigned to protect the Imam. To be accepted into this union, one had to show outstanding success and prove that he was loyal to the Imam. It consisted of an average of 5,000 soldiers.

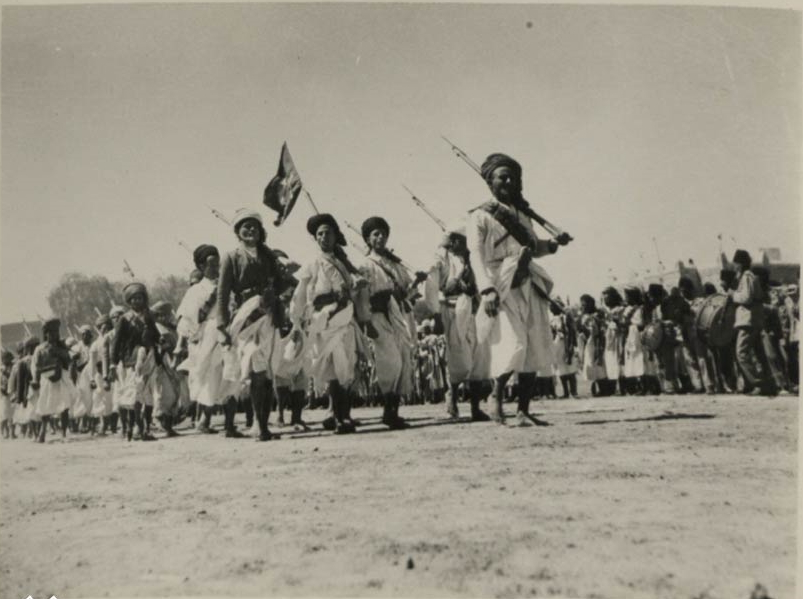
Military march of the Victorious Army

- Victorious Army: It was founded in 1919, and its first soldiers were former Yemeni soldiers of the Ottoman Empire. When the army was first established; The arsenals were filled with a large number of approximately 400,000 rifles of various types, in addition to light and heavy artillery batteries of different calibers and weights. Every year, each tribe had to send a specified number of soldiers to the state. Each tribe contained a scribe who reported the behavior, rewards, and misdeeds of the tribe's members. If a soldier stole or left the army without permission, the tribal leader had to compensate the imam for the damage. In addition to subjugating rebellious tribes, carrying out military operations and protecting imams, princes and public officials in the state, the army also carries out operations such as maintaining authority and collecting taxes.

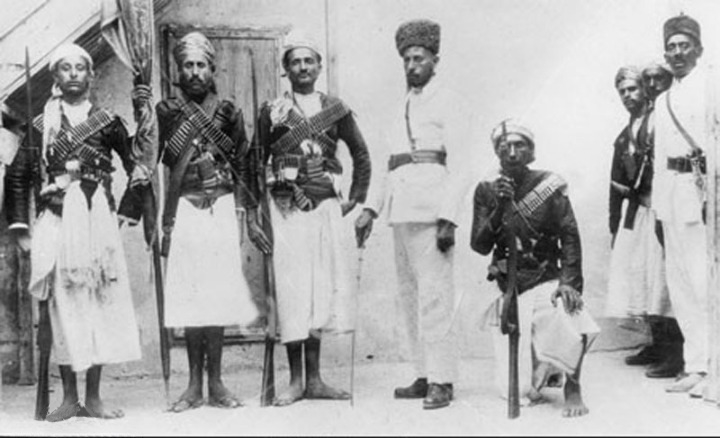
Tribesmen in Sana'a

- Defense Army: It was established in 1937 due to the inadequacy of the Victorious Army. After losing a significant part of Yemen following the war with the Saudis and the British, Imam Yahya came to the conclusion that his army needed modernization and better training conditions. After the failure of the reform attempts in the Victorious Army and the emergence of complaints among the officers, and under the pressure of the intellectuals, Imam Yahya decided to "establish a new army, which is a regular Defense Army based on compulsory service for all gun owners, regardless of age."
- The following is the case: After the fall of the Kingdom of Hejaz Lieutenant General Hasan Tahsin al-F akîr came to Yemen and assisted Imam Yahya as a military advisor from 1930 to 1944. Defense during aid He played a major role in establishing the Army. (Note: Born, raised and educated in Damascus; A commander who did military service in the Ottoman army)
- Unlike the Victorious Army, training was based on experience rather than theory, but this training period was still not enough for the soldiers to master military training, combat skills and military training. It consisted of all Yemenis with compulsory military service. After being drafted into the army, they received training periodically for 10 years.
- National Army: An independent army similar to the Victorious and Defending armies. Its commander was Colonel Muhammed Hamid.
- Barani Army (Tribal Army): They were irregular units that served voluntarily. It consisted of infantry and cavalry, who usually served for 1–2 years and brought their own rifles and supplies. Yemen has always relied primarily on tribal supporters in its wars against its rivals. These tribes generally live in the northern, northwestern and eastern regions. These types of warriors are classified as "traditional national armies", which are led by tribal chiefs and have no regular formation.

=== Air Force ===
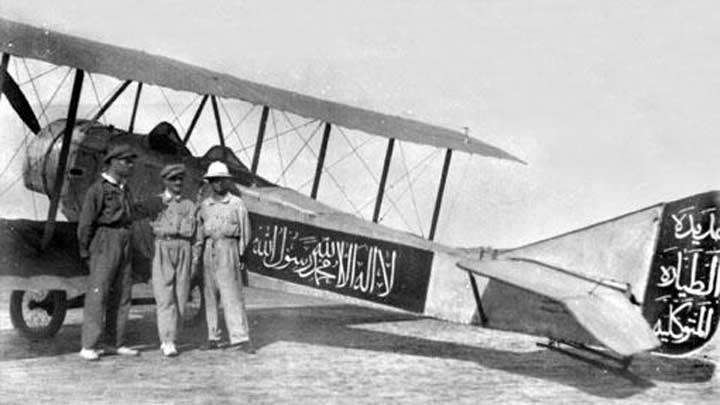
Yemen Mutawakkilite Kingdom Fighter Plane

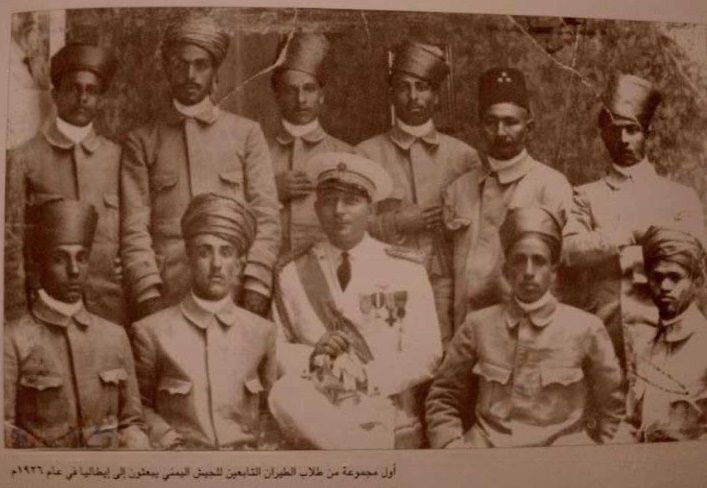
The first group of aviation students affiliated with the Yemeni army that were sent to Italy in 1926.

Yemen Air Force Medallion

With the help of the Germans and Italians, the Yemeni Air Force was established in 1926. Imam Yahya contacted the Kingdom of Italy to provide aircraft to his country because the Royal Air Force bombed Yemen during the British-Yemeni border conflicts in the 1920s and Yemen could not respond to this since it did not have any aircraft or anti-aircraft guns. In January 1926, a contract was made with Italy for the delivery of 6 aircraft, the first 3 of which would arrive in April. In 1926, 12 Yemenis were sent to Italy to receive flight training, and a flight school was established in Yemen with the help of an Italian team. After it was determined that the planes coming from Italy were in bad condition, Imam Yahya complained about this situation to the Italians. After this situation, Italy agreed to provide better aircraft to Yemen. One of the better planes arrived in Yemen in August. In the same year, he purchased Junkers designed Junkers A 35 and Junkers F 13 aircraft from Germany. The Junkers A35 plane delivered to Yemen crashed less than two months later, killing all three crew members. Since border conflicts with the British began immediately after these events, Imam Yahya had to stop his efforts to establish an air force, and all his planes were banned. 1940 At the end of the 1960s, the movement to establish an air force was revived. Second-hand Junkers Ju 52/3m transport aircraft from Lebanon, C64 Norseman from Egypt, Douglas C-47 Skytrain aircraft from the Republic of Italy Retrieved. In 1955, 2 USAAF AT-6C training aircraft were donated by Saudi Arabia to the Mutawakkili Kingdom of Yemen. An arms agreement was signed with the Socialist Republic of Czechoslovakia in 1957 for 24 Ilyushin Il-10 attack aircraft. However, due to the lack of support materials and spare parts, none of these planes could be flown. (Note: The planes that could not be flown were most likely This are the planes in the photo.) In the same period, 2 Mil Mi-1 and 4 Mil Mi-4 helicopters from the Soviet Union; Ilyushin Il-14 transport aircraft were purchased and a Soviet flight school was opened in Yemen. Flight schools were equipped with 10 Czechoslovak-made Zlín Z-26 training aircraft.

=== Army Modernization ===
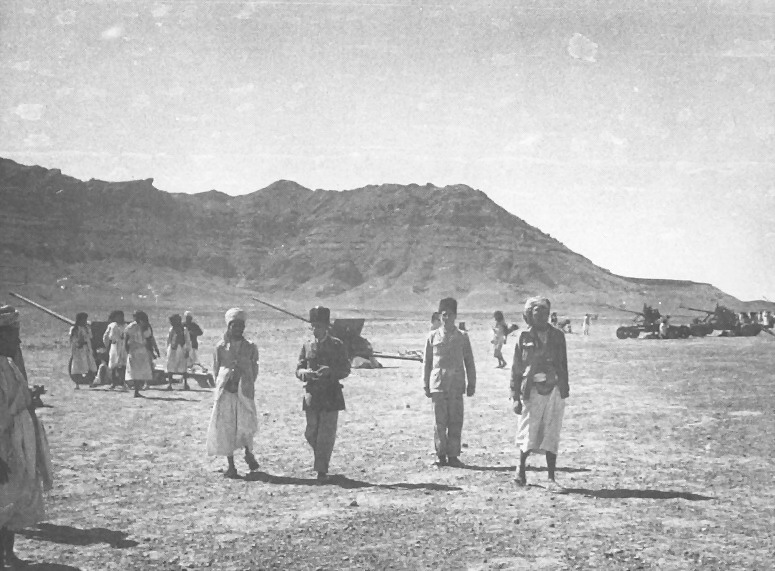
Artillery Training camp in 1958

When the Kingdom of Yemen was first established, the Ottoman Empire invested more in the Balkans than in the Arabian Peninsula and Anatolia, apart from agriculture. There was nothing. The weapons they stole from the Ottomans and they had no weapons other than the rifles they bought from the Kingdom of Italy and the United Kingdom. For this, Imam Yahya ordered the establishment of an ammunition factory in the early 1920s with the help of Yugoslav (or German) and Austria.

After the defeat in the Saudi-Yemeni war in 1934, the Imam saw the need to modernize and expand the armed forces. From Italy, he purchased 6 light tanks, 2,000 rifles, four anti-aircraft guns, 4 cannons, and some communication equipment. A few rifles and communication equipment were received from the Kingdom of Iraq. Italy also opened a flight school in Sana'a.

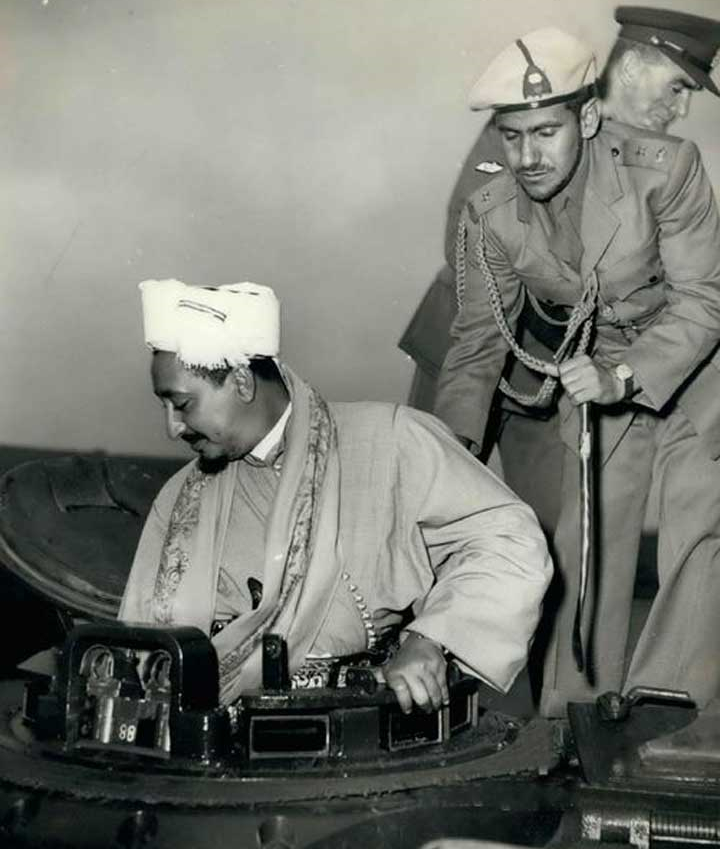
al-Badr inspecting one of the tanks

Despite the pressure exerted by Western countries, including the United States and the United Kingdom, on the armament of Yemen, Imam Muhammad al-Badr was determined to strengthen the Yemeni army. An agreement was signed with Egyptian President Gamal Abdel Nasser to bring some military experts and officers from Egypt. In addition, the Eastern Bloc signed agreements with some countries, especially the Soviet Union, Czechoslovakia, and China, on the supply of weapons to Yemen, their maintenance, and the training of Yemeni soldiers. As a result of the agreements, 34 light tanks, 50 100mm caliber tanks, 100 field guns, 70 personnel carriers, one armored vehicle, and 70 transport trucks were purchased. This agreement is considered a big step in the history of the Yemeni army. These reforms continued until the revolution broke out on 26 September 1962:

- In 1957, the Military Academy was reopened and new military schools were opened in Sana'a and Taiz.
- In 1958, the Aviation College, Petty Officer School, Artillery Training camp, and the new Military Academy were established.
- In 1959, the Police College was established in Taiz. (Note: Policemen who graduated from this College were the first policemen of Yemen.)
- Instructors were brought for the soldiers from the Soviet Union and Egypt.
- New unions established:
  - Al-Badr Regiment: The first armored unit in the Yemeni army.
  - National Army: An army similar to the Victorious and Defensive army.
  - Yemen command: A general command subordinate to al-Badr for direct control of the army.

=== Army size before the revolution ===
Before the North Yemen Civil War, the Mutawakkilite Kingdom of Yemen had a regular army of 40,447 men of various ranks.

- Victorious Army: 22,090 personnel
- Defense Army: 15,990 personnel
- National Army: 1,396 personnel
- al-Badr Regiment: 971 personnel

== Geography ==
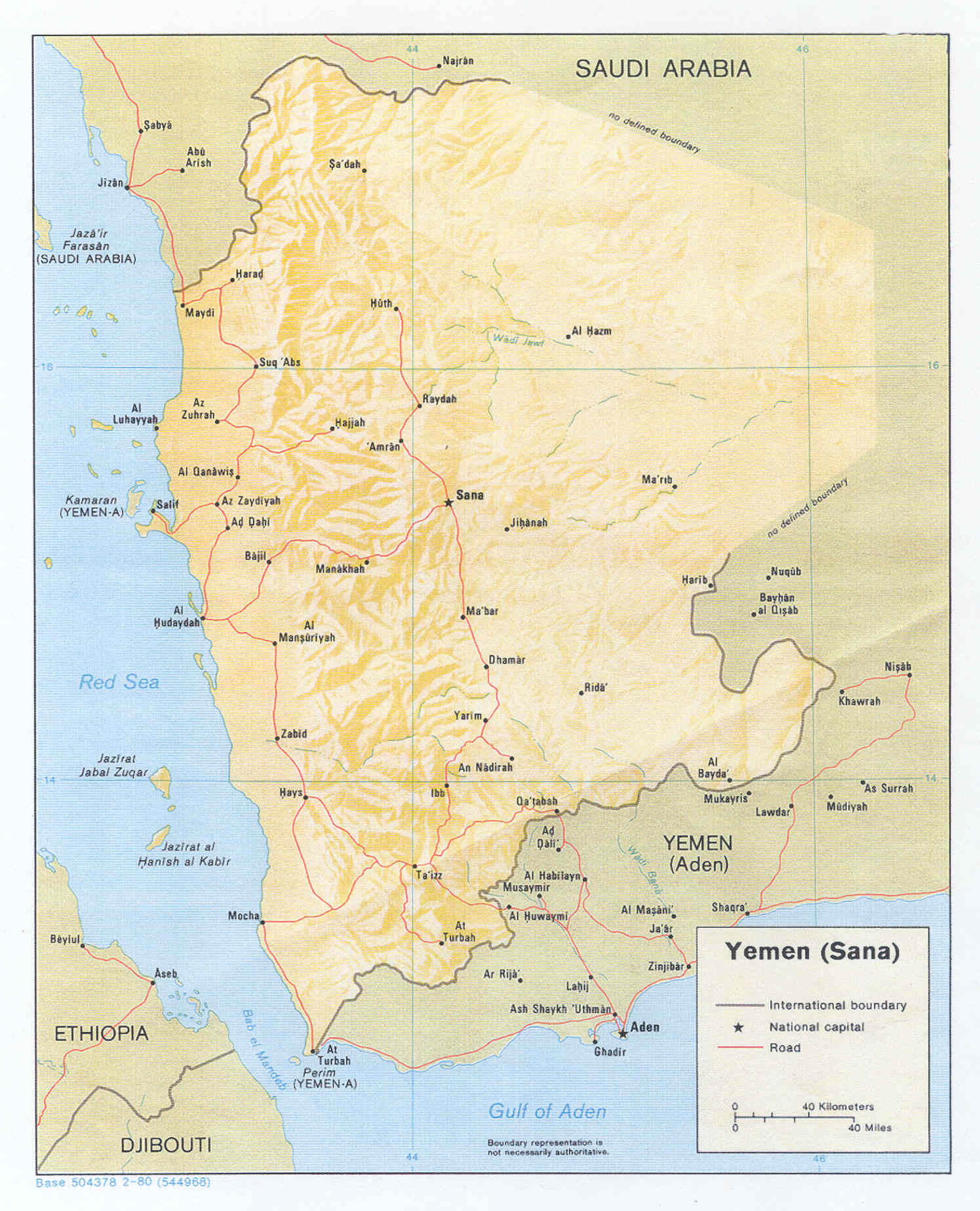
Yemen map

The Mutawakkilite Kingdom of Yemen was an Asian country. The country, which remained in southwestern Arabia, had the Red Sea in the west, Saudi Arabia in the north, Aden Protectorate under British protection in the south, Aden Colony, Oman in the east, Bab-el-Mandeb strait in the southwest. The borders of the country were unclear, except for those determined in the Treaty of Taif and the Treaty of Friendship to Sanaa.

The territory of the Mutawakkilite Kingdom of Yemen roughly resembles a square shape. It is 450 kilometers long and 490 kilometers wide. 17° and 13° with northern parallels 43° and 45° was located between the eastern meridians. It consisted almost entirely of land, with lakes making up an insignificant part.

The mountains of Yemen are one of the highest mountains in the world. The plateaus in Yemen are the wettest areas in the region. Annual rainfall was over 22 inches. Most of the precipitation occurred during the summer months. Because it is a mountainous area, the temperature could approach freezing during the winter months. There are no permanent rivers, streams, lakes, etc. in Yemen. did not have. Most of the flash floods that frequently occurred in the region flowed into the Red Sea. Desert climate in the country It was effective and dust and sand storms were seen throughout the year.

== Demographics ==
=== Religion ===
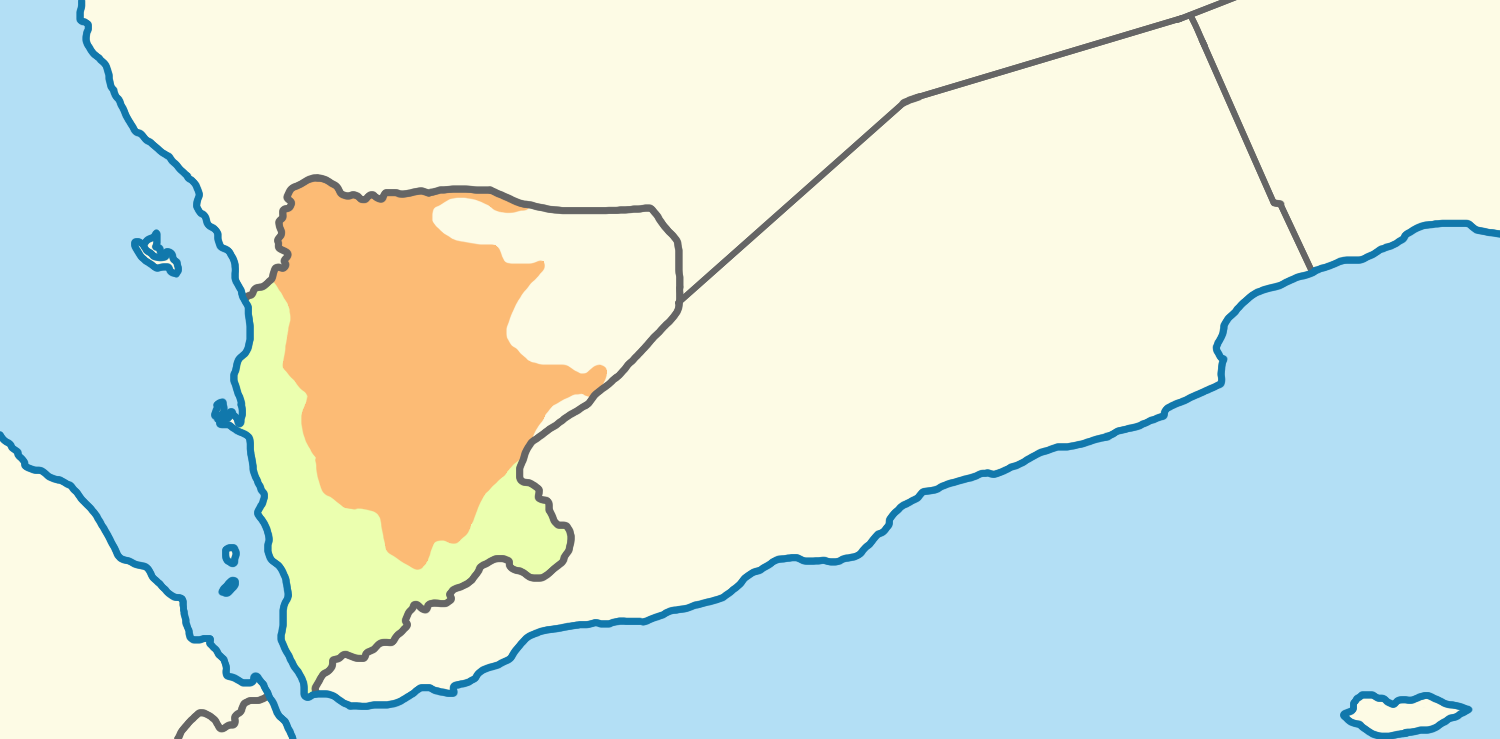
North Yemen sect map Zaydi Sunni

The Zaydis, followers of a branch of Shia Islam, have been politically and culturally dominant in Yemen for centuries and have continued to exist since they moved into the northern highlands of the Yemen region, which has a unique socio-cultural structure. (Note: The northern highlands of Yemen (Upper and Lower Yemen) and the Caspian regions of Northern Iran (Tabaristan, Daylam, and Gilan) are the two primary areas where the Zaydis have prospered. However, the political and cultural center of Zaydism moved from Iran to Yemen in the early twelfth century, and Iranian Zaydism eventually became defunct.) They established a state that, interrupted at times, was following a politically ambiguous and unstable course. The first rebellions of the Sunni population, who did not accept the religious-political rule of the Zaydis, took place during the period of the Yemeni imam Al-Hadi ila'l-Haqq Yahya.

The territory governed by the Mutawakkilite Kingdom of Yemen comprised almost equal proportions of Shia and Sunni populations.

==== Yemenite Jews ====
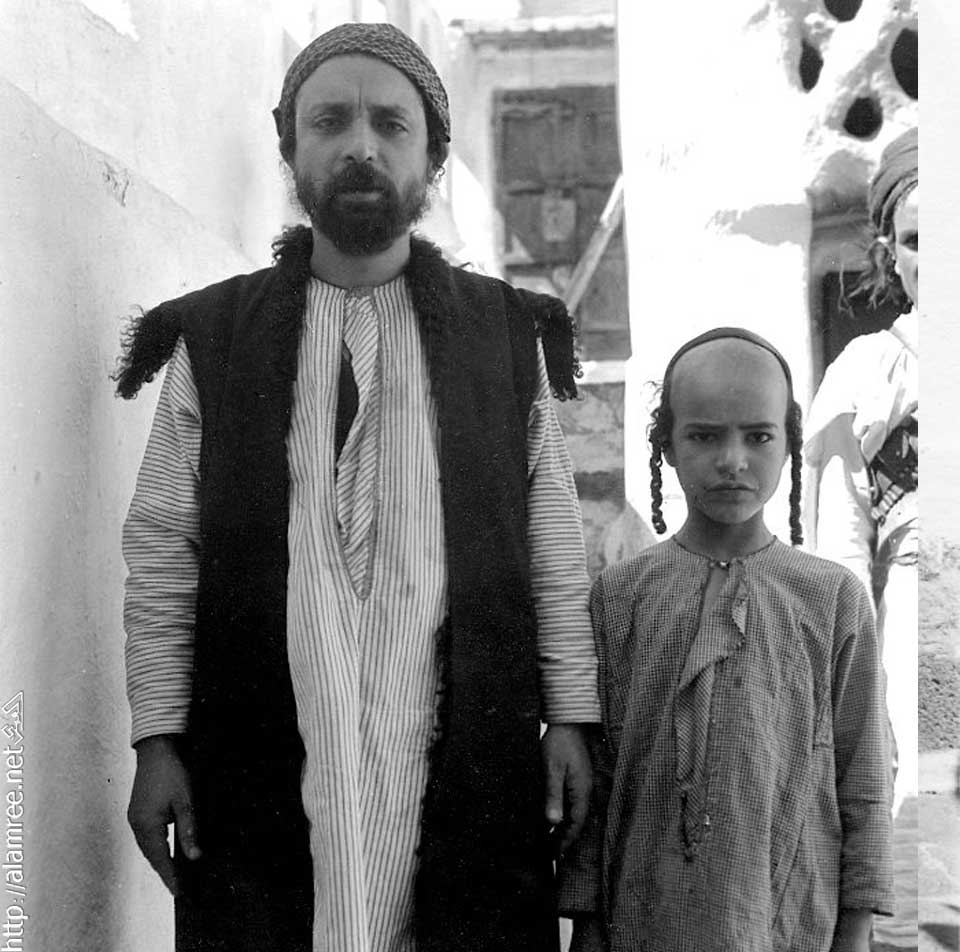
Yemenite father and son in 1937

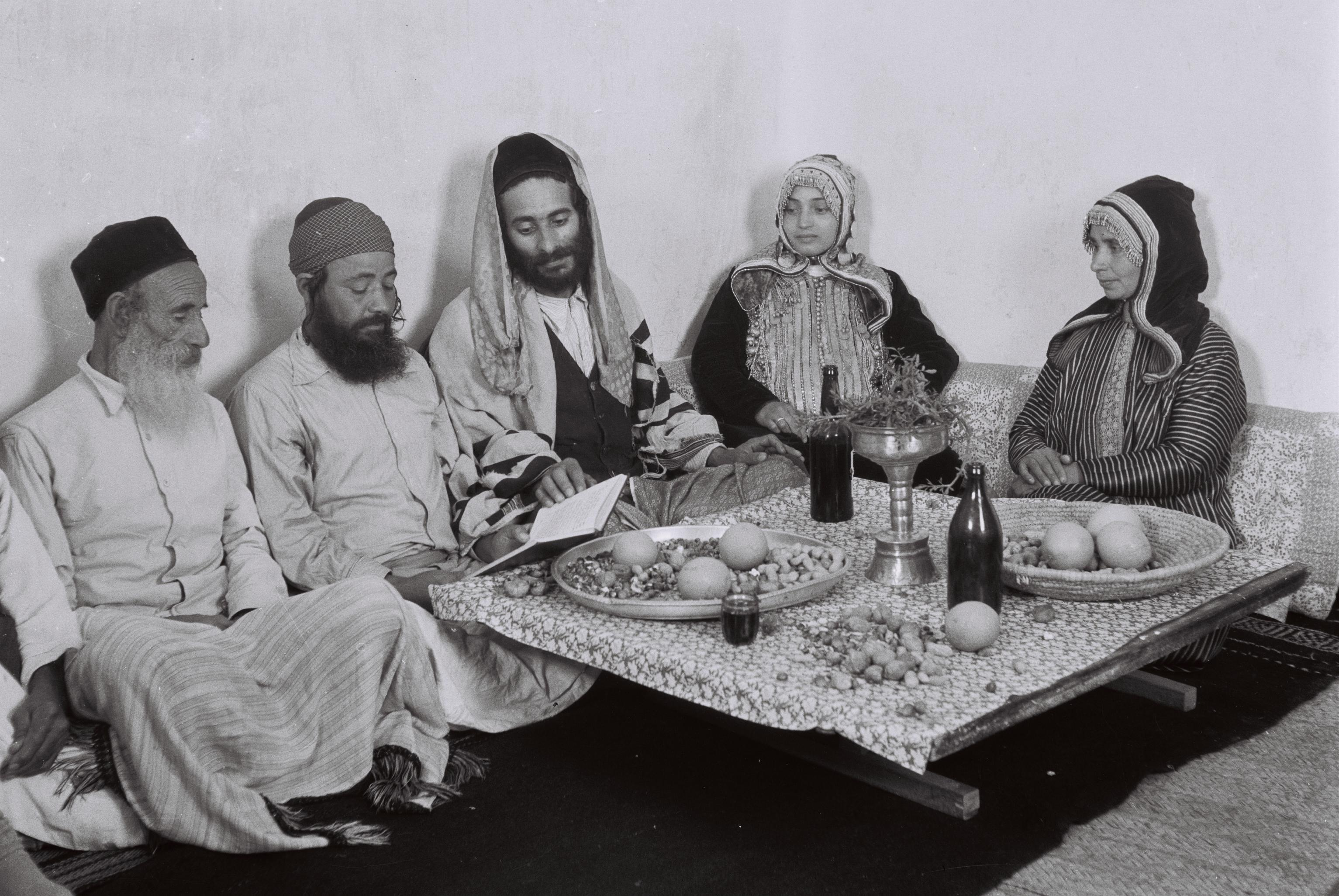
A Yemenite family reading from the psalms on Shabbat after lunch

Judaism was the first Abrahamic religion to come to Yemen. Christianity was the majority religion in Yemen until its introduction to Islam. Until 1948, approximately 50,000 Yemeni Jews lived in the Mutawakkilite Kingdom of Yemen. The Jews were exiled during the reign of Hasan, but later, due to economic reasons, the Jews who were craftsmen were settled in separate neighborhoods, isolated from the city and Muslims. In the late 18th century, the Imams of Yemen enacted a law known as the Orphans' Decree, based on their legal interpretations.

The Orphan Edict was ignored during Ottoman rule (1872–1918). But in 1921, when Imam Yahya became fully dominant in Yemen, he reinstated this law. British historian Tudor Parfitt likened this situation to "the brutal measures that introduced the compulsory conscription of Jewish children into the Tsarist army in Russia". At first, the edict was not implemented by the authorities as much as it could have been in the Ottoman Empire. In some places, the authorities turned a blind eye to the children running away and hiding, but since the imam was insistent on this issue, troops were sent to search for the escaped children in more central locations. Jewish community leaders suspected of hiding Jewish children were arrested and tortured in prisons.

One of the important people who was converted to Islam with the Orphan Edict was Abdul Rahman al-Eryani, who was claimed to be of Jewish origin by Mishpacha. He was allegedly born Zekharia Hadad in 1910 to a Jewish family in Ibb. After his parents died due to an epidemic when he was eight years old, he and his 5-year-old sister were protected by the Orphan Edict. He was given to separate protective families with his brother and renamed Abdul Rahman al-Eryani. Eryani later served as minister of religious endowments in the Yemen Arab Republic, becoming the only civilian to lead North Yemen. However, an interview by YemenOnline, an online newspaper, with several members of the al-Eryani family In the interview, he denied the claim that Abdul Rahman al-Eryani was Jewish. According to them, it is a distortion put forward by Israeli newspaper HaOlam HaZeh in 1967. Zekharia Haddad is actually Abdulrahim al-Haddat, the half-brother and bodyguard of Abdul Rahman al-Eryani.

Jews were considered impure and therefore Jews were forbidden from touching a Muslim or Muslim's food.

== Economy ==
=== Transportation ===
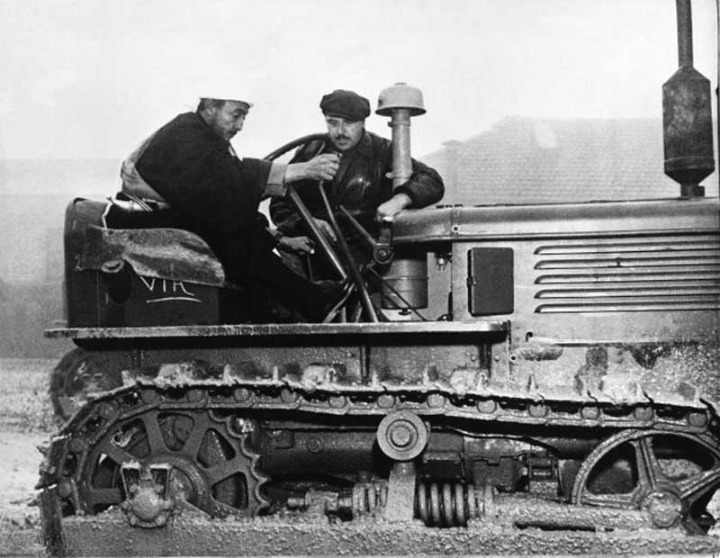
Vizier Hasan bin Yahya driving a tractor in Italy in 1953.

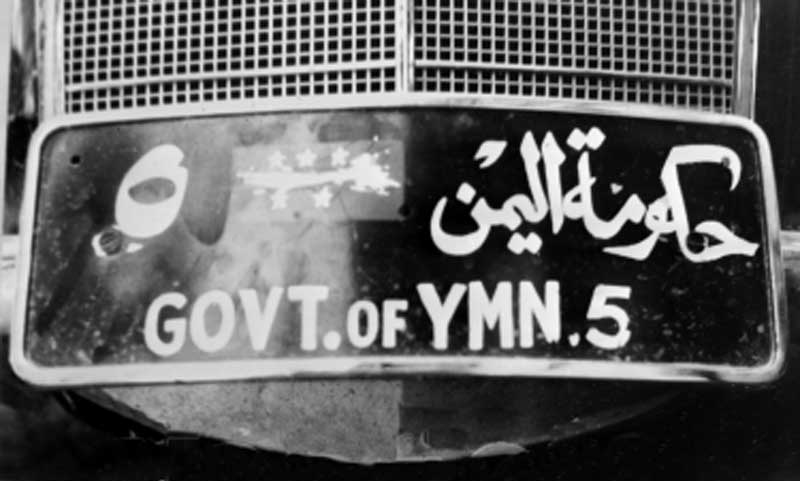
A car license plate issued by the Kingdom of Yemen

Transportation has always been challenging and long due to Yemen's deserts and mountainous terrain. Except for a few roads built by the Ottoman Empire after its arrival in Yemen, there were not many roads in the Mutawakkilite Kingdom of Yemen. The repair of these roads was usually done by prisoners of war or prisoners. Although the Ottoman Empire brought some cars to Yemen, they took most cars with them when troops withdrew from Yemen in accordance with the Armistice of Mudros. The first automobile to arrive in Yemen was when Brigadier General Yakup brought a Ford model automobile as a gift while visiting Imam Yahya in 1923. Although this automobile was not welcomed at first because there were only horse-drawn carriages in Yemen until then, when Imam Yahya declared that the use of this foreign invention was permissible, princes, high-ranking officials, rich merchants, and high-ranking soldiers began to buy automobiles. The use of automobiles is prohibited except on main roads and ring roads. Heavy fines were imposed on those who used it. Until the early 1950s, only those with important government jobs and European merchants in Hudaydah had cars.

Imam Yahya established a national transportation and transportation company for the villagers who went to the cities to sell goods and for transportation, but the expeditions of this company did not cover the whole of Yemen. In more mountainous regions where there were no expeditions, transportation was generally provided by caravans consisting of camels, mules, and donkeys, via paths. The bases of various brigades such as Liva al-Sham, Haci, Ma'rib, and Ibb were established at the points where these paths meet. Thus, the caravans could be protected from bandits.

During the Ottoman Empire, a railway connecting Hudaydah and Sana'a was built. While some repairs were being made in the port of Hudaydah by the French in 1908, an 8 km railway was built, but after the port was bombed by the Italians in 1912, it was closed to the railways in Yemen. Not much attention has been paid. Following the 1934 Sana'a Friendship Treaty, the United Kingdom presented Imam Yahya with the idea of connecting Aden and Sana'a by railway. According to Imam Yahya, "their real desire and main goal is to disintegrate and disperse Islam, so that they can dominate us and make us slaves".

== Gallery ==
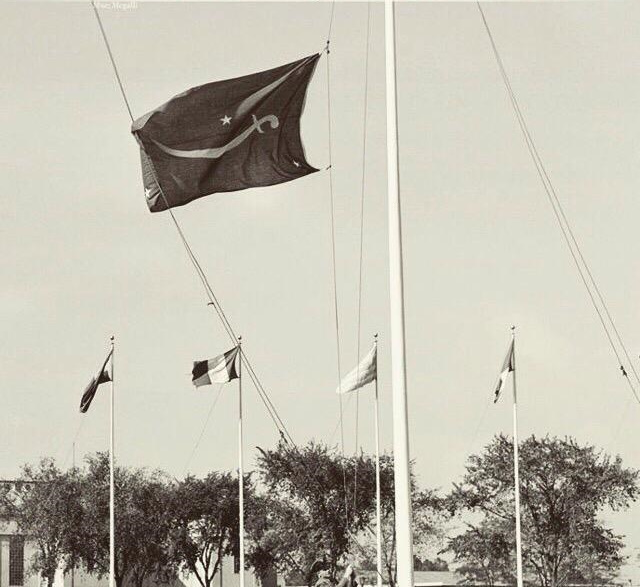
A photograph of the Yemen Flag taken at the UN on September 20, 1947

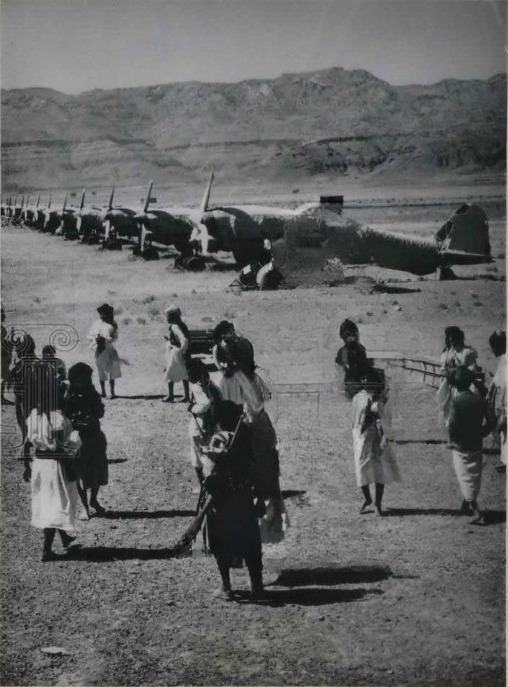
Soviet planes that were not used because there were no pilots to fly them.

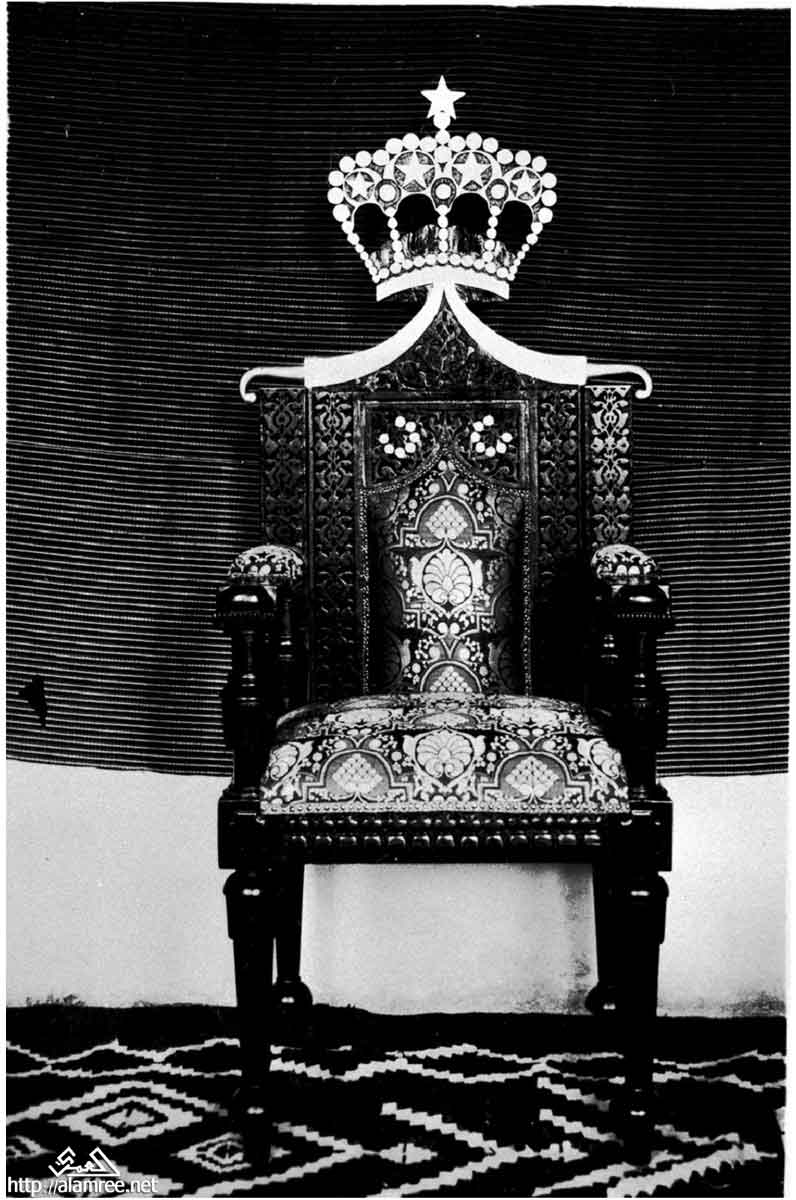
Imamate throne

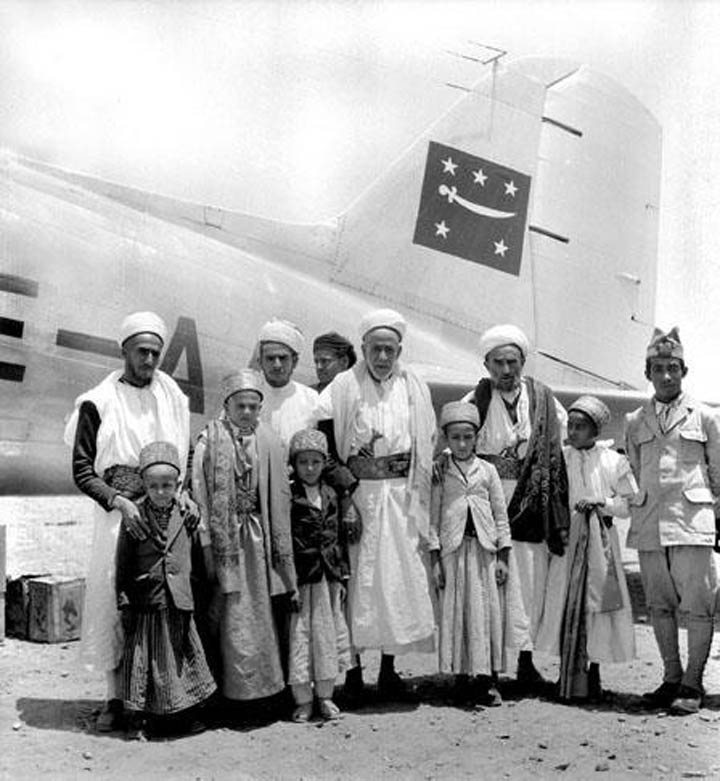
Photo of a Yemen Airlines plane in the 1950s
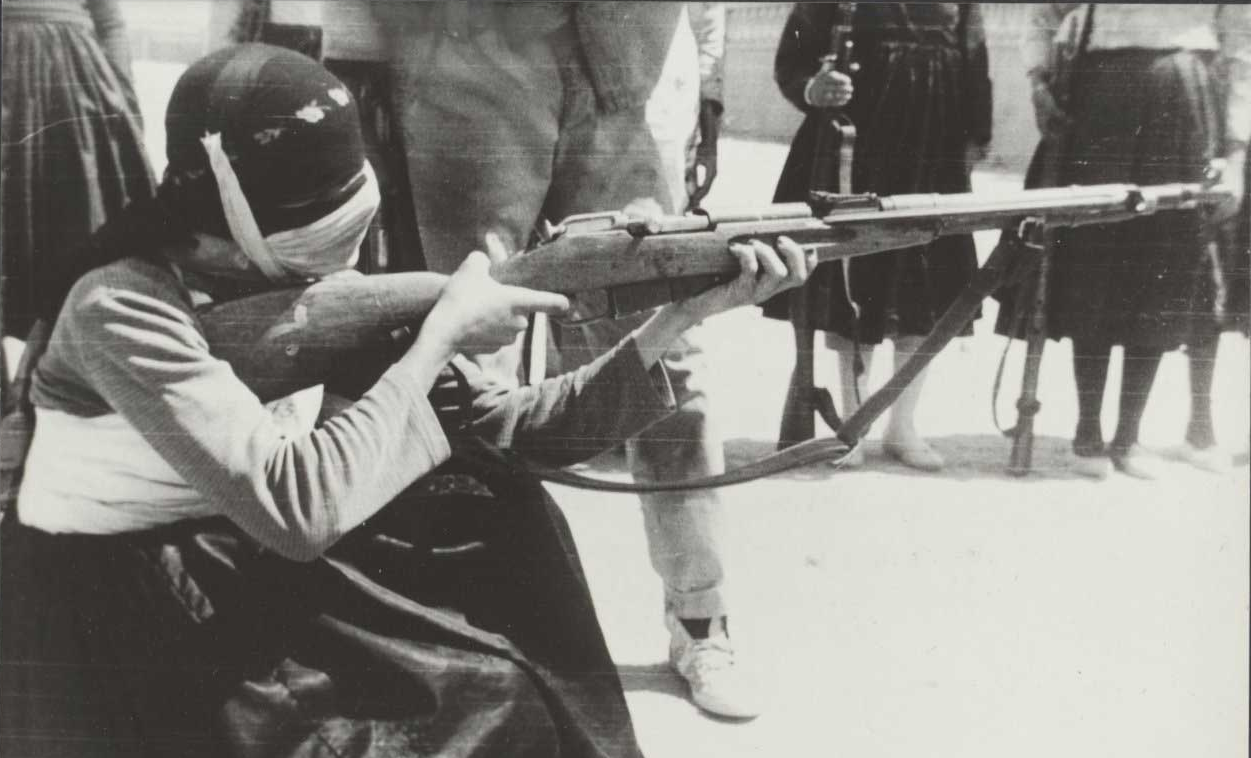
A weaver woman receiving weapons training during the North Yemen Civil War

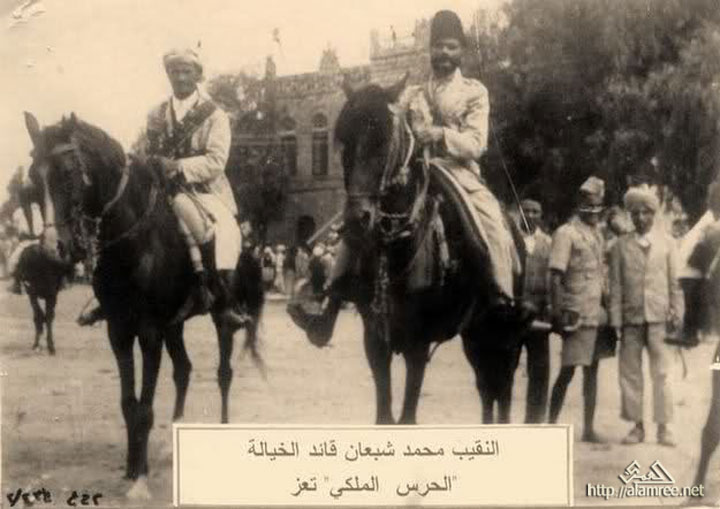
Commander Muhammed Şaban and the Royal Guards, Taiz

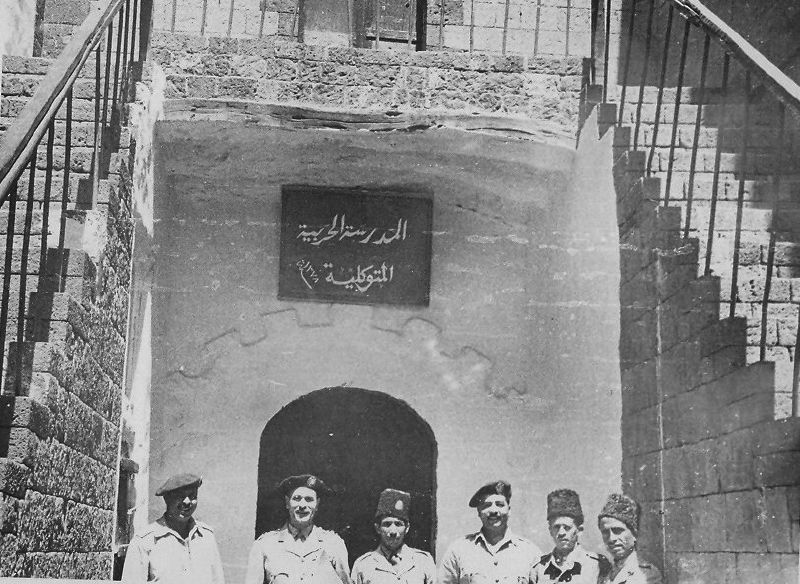
A view from Sana'a Military School in 1958

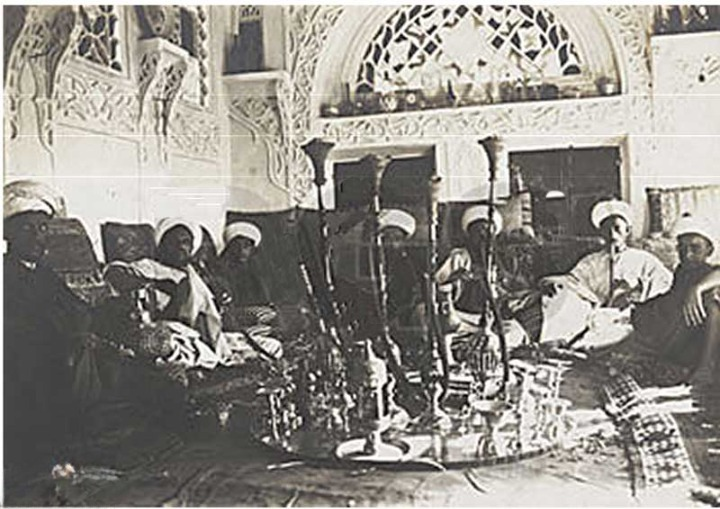
A Yemeni house in 1912

=== Postage stamps ===
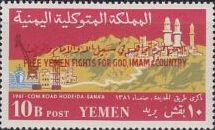
Postage stamp commemorating the road connecting Hodeidah to Sana'a

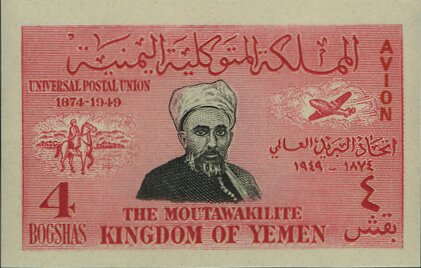
A postage stamp made for Ahmad bin Yahya

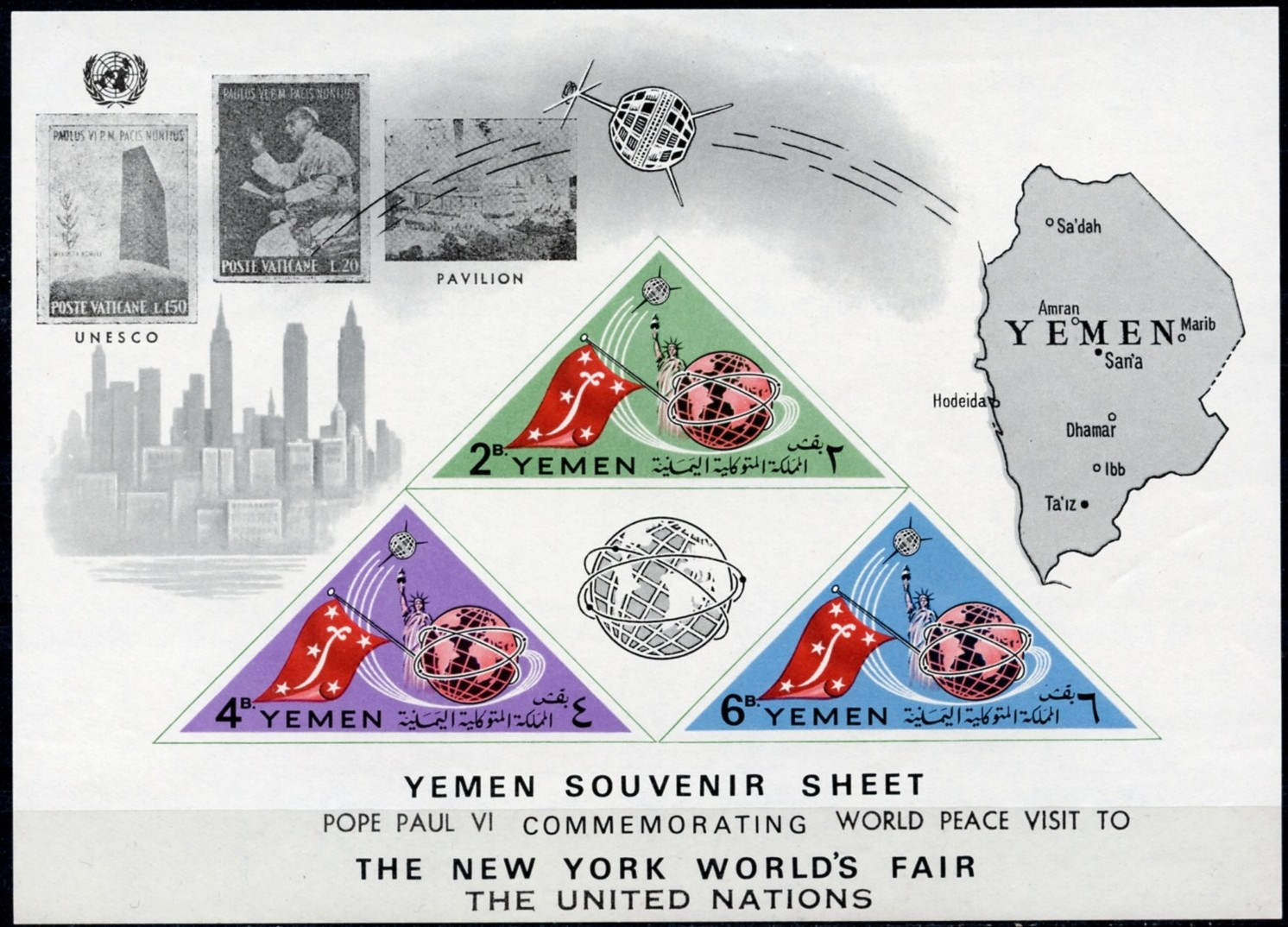
A stamp related to Yemen's accession to the United Nations

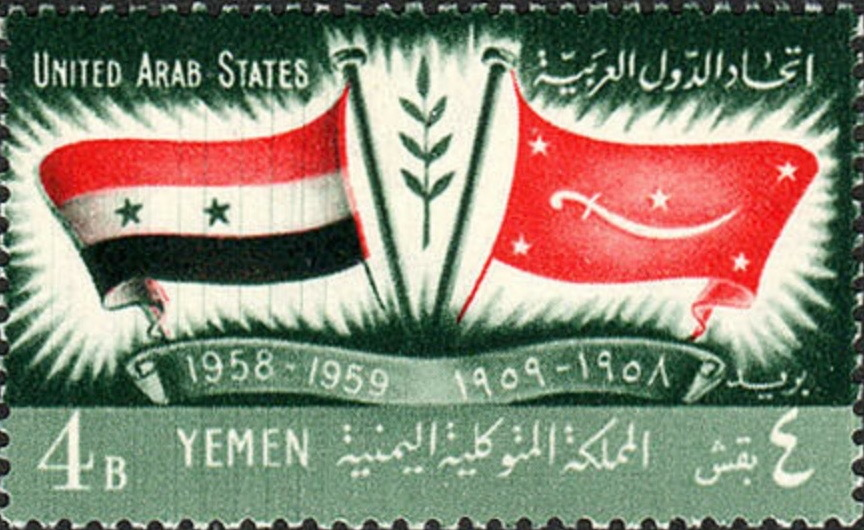
United Arab States
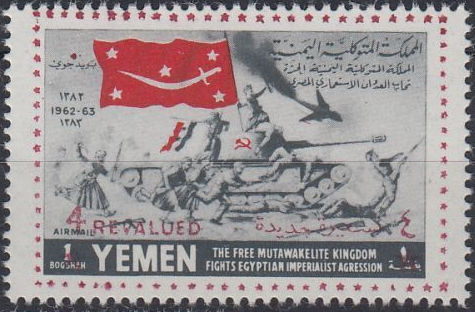
A postage stamp related to the North Yemen Civil War

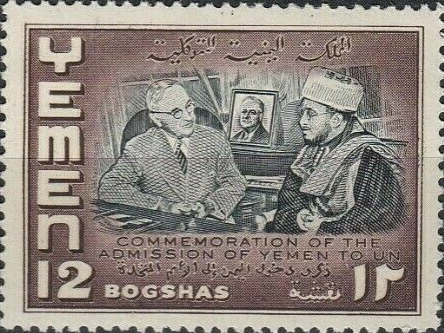
A postage stamp related to Hasan bin Yahya

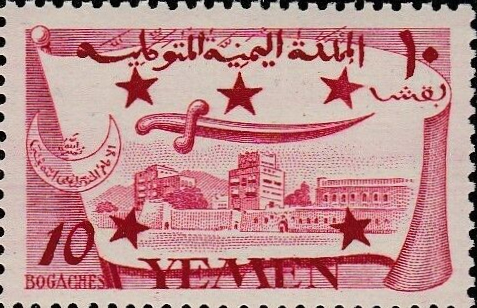
Kingdom of Yemen postage stamp

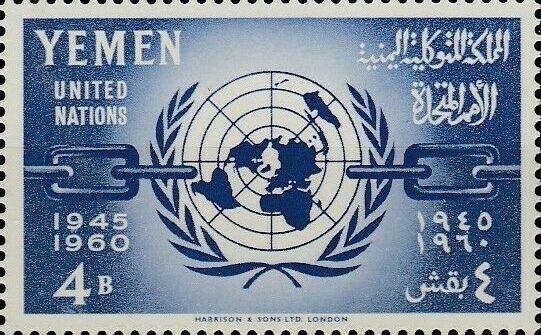
A stamp regarding Yemen's accession to the United Nations
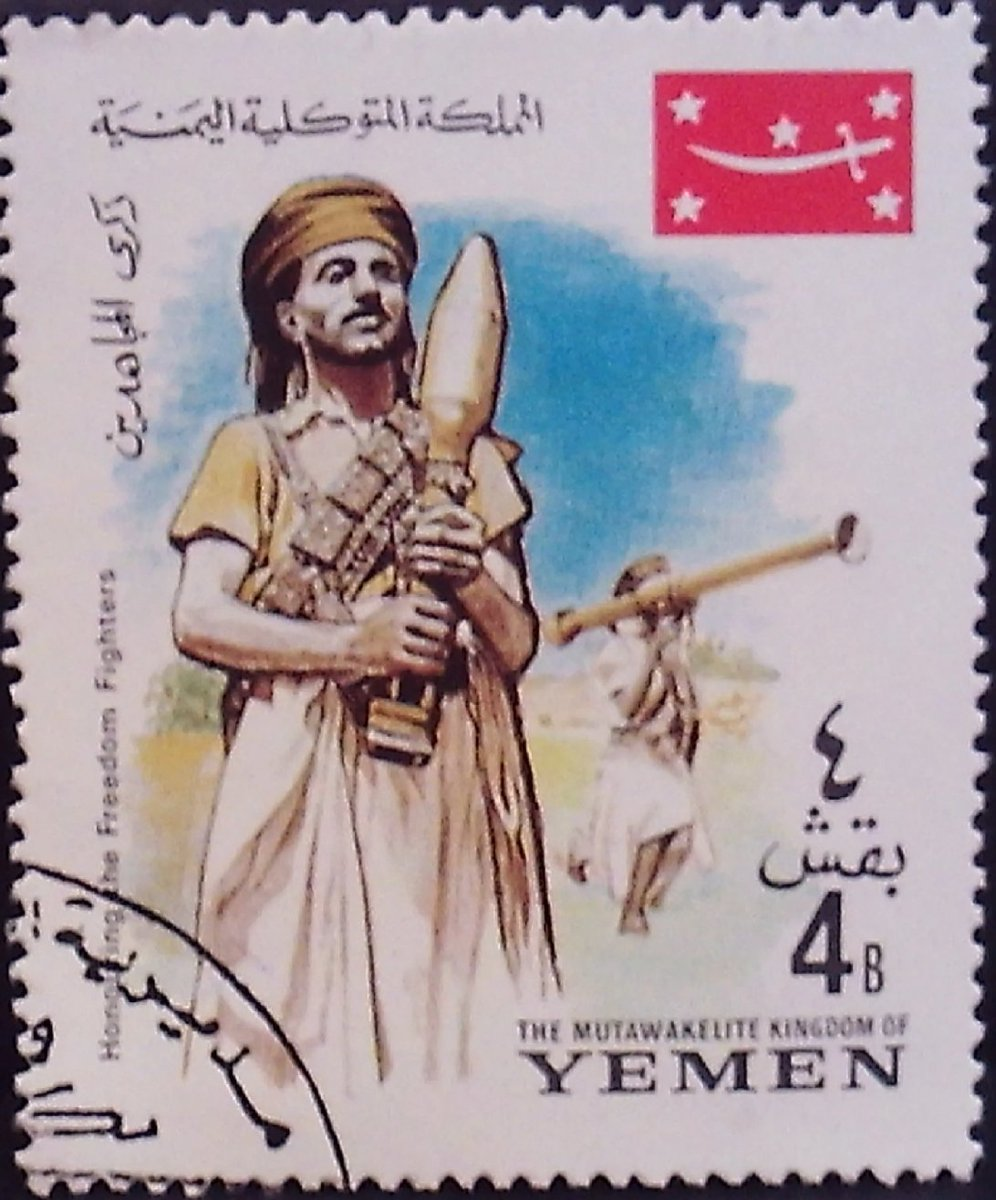
Postage stamp commemorating the Mujahideen

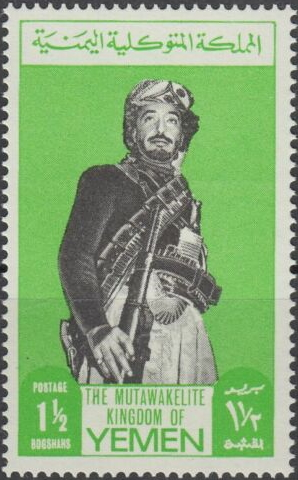
A stamp made for Muhammad al-Badr

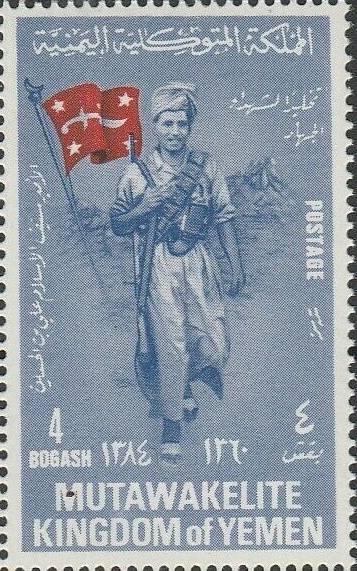
A postage stamp related to the North Yemen Civil War

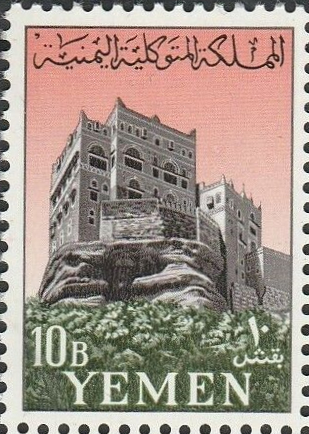
Dar al-Hajar, the residence of Imam Yahya

=== Flags ===
Plain red flag (1918–23)

Flag with shahada (1923–1927)

Flag variant with thicker stars (1927–1970)

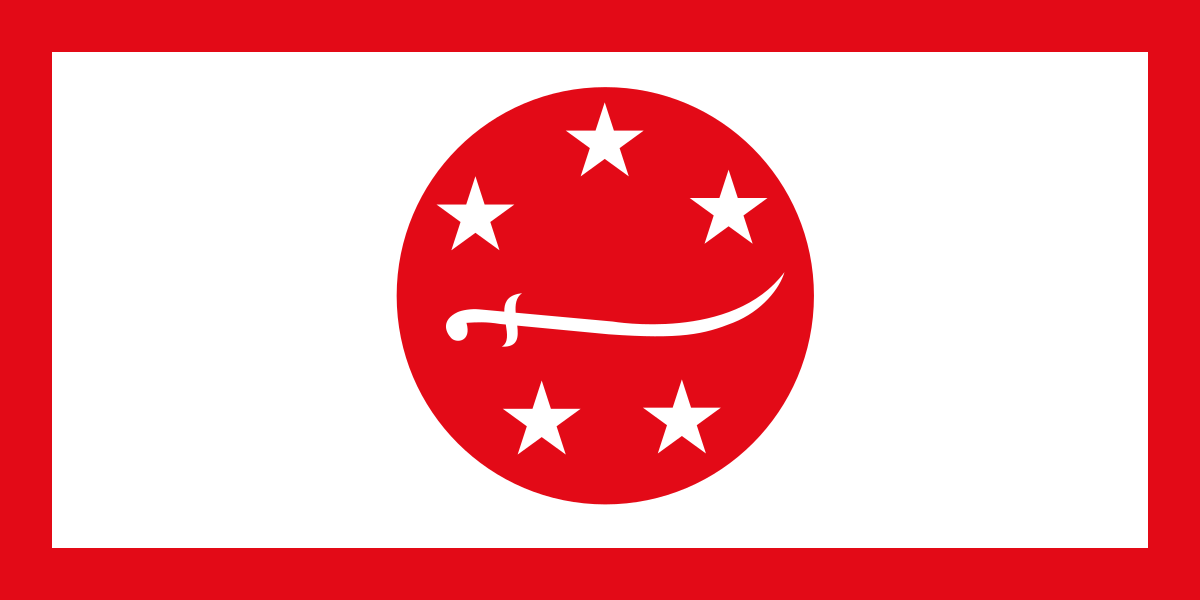
Yemen Kingdom Air Force flag

== See also ==
- History of Yemen
- Imams of Yemen
- List of Shia dynasties
- United Arab States
- Yemen Arab Republic
