= Flag of the Kingdom of Yemen =

Kingdom of Yemen

The national flag of the Kingdom of Yemen was the flag was in use in North Yemen until 1962 when the imam was overthrown and the Yemen Arab Republic was established. A civil war between republicans and royalists continued until 1970, with the royalist side continuing to use the flag of the kingdom.

The flag of the kingdom was a plain red flag that flew from 1918 till 1923, when a white Arabic script known as the shahada was added. In 1927, the shahada flag was replaced with a flag which had an Arab Sabre and five five-pointed stars representing the 5 geographic regions of Yemen and the Five Pillars of Islam.

== Meaning behind the flag ==
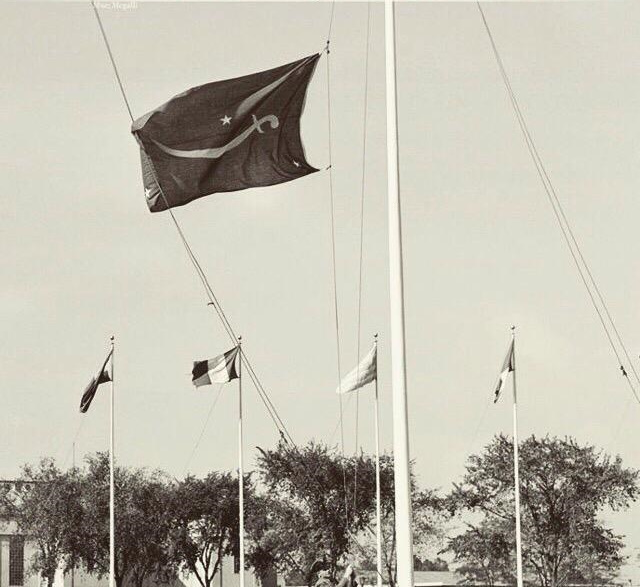
A photograph of the Yemen Flag taken at the UN on September 20, 1947

The five stars represent the five geographic regions of Yemen; they also recall the Five Pillars of Islam, and the prayers (Salah) five times a day.

The saber, widely used as an emblem by Arabs, and the red field on which it is placed, are reminders to the people of the blood they have sacrificed in defense of the liberty and independence of their country.

Kingdom of Yemen
(1918–1923)

Kingdom of Yemen
(1923–1927)

Kingdom of Yemen
(1927–1970)

== See also ==
- Flag of Yemen
- Flag of South Yemen
