= List of wars: 1900–1944 =

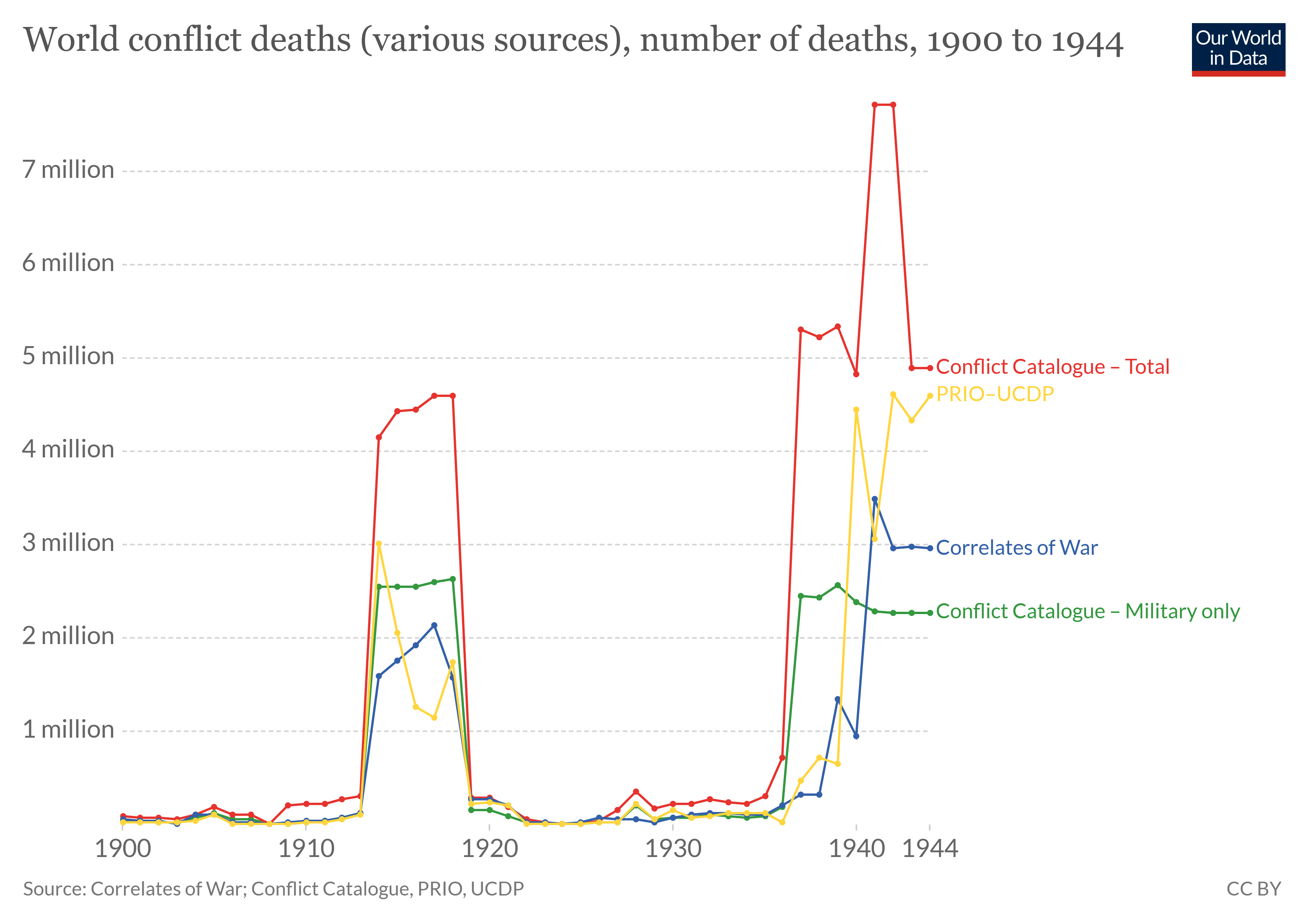
Graph of global conflict deaths from 1900 to 1944 from various sources.

This is a list of wars that began between 1900 and 1944.

This period saw the outbreak of World War I (1914–1918) and World War II (1939–1945), which are among the deadliest conflicts in human history, with many of the world's great powers partaking in total war and some partaking in genocides. Depending on the source consulted, conflict deaths reached an all-time peak in either 1941 or 1942 at 2.96–7.71 million, during the height of the latter conflict.

Besides the aforementioned world wars, a number of smaller conflicts also took place. In Africa, conflicts of this era were mostly fought between European colonial forces on one side and native kingdoms and insurgents on the other. There are exceptions (e.g. the Italo-Turkish War, as well as intercolonial invasions of English, German, Italian and Vichy French possessions in the World Wars). Likewise, there were several large native rebellions in Southeast Asia against the European, Japanese and American colonial empires. The intercolonial Pacific War of World War II brought many countries into conflict in that theatre.

Other parts of Afro-Eurasia, as well as the Americas, saw a wide variety of conventional wars, civil wars, ethnic or political conflicts, revolutions, and small rebellions. Prior to 1940, Australia saw only sporadic conflict as the frontier wars entered its final stages. However, in World War II, Australia became the site of Axis naval activity and air raids.

== 1900–1909 ==
1900–1909
Start	Finish	Name of Conflict	Belligerents	
Start	Finish	Name of Conflict	Victorious party (if applicable)	Defeated party (if applicable)
1900	1905	1900–1905 phase of the Mat Salleh Rebellion	British Empire: North Borneo	Rebels
1900	1920	Dervish War	British Empire; Ethiopian Empire; Italian Empire	Dervish State
1900	1900	War of the Golden Stool	British Empire	Ashanti Empire
1900	1905	Zande resistance	British Empire: Anglo-Egyptian Sudan	Sultan Yam-bio's rebel forces
1900	1902	Muhammad Umar Khan's rebellion	British Empire: State of Makran	Forces loyal to Muhammad Umar Khan
1900	1900	1900 Hamawand revolt	Ottoman Empire	Hamawand rebels Supported by: Sheikhs of Sulaymaniyah and Qaradāgh
1900	1900	1900 Sudan revolt	British Empire: Anglo-Egyptian Sudan	Sudanese rebels
1900	1900	French conquest of Borno	France	Borno
1900	1907	Unrest in Java	Dutch Empire	Peasant rebels Lone-wolf robbers and arsonists
1900	1903	1900–1903 uprising in southwest Madagascar	France	Rebels
1900	1900	Shoubak revolt of 1900	Ottoman Empire	Shoubakis
1900	1900	Sharjah conquest of Ras Al Khaimah	Emirate of Sharjah	Ras Al Khaimah
1900	1900	Russian invasion of Manchuria	Russian Empire	Qing dynasty Yìhéquán
1900	1901	Mahsud Waziri blockade	British Empire: British Raj	Mahsud rebels
1900	1901	Kuwaiti–Rashidi war	Jabal Shammar	Kuwait: House of Saud; Arab tribes: Al-Muntafiq; Mutayr; Otaibah; Al-Dhafeer; Ajman tribe; Al-Hawajir; Al Murrah; Bani Khalid; Subay'; Suhool
1901	1901	Risings among the Agar Dinka	British Empire: Anglo-Egyptian Sudan	Agar Dinka rebels
1901	1901	Bastaard uprising of 1901	German Empire: German South West Africa	Bastaards from Grootfontein tribe
1901	1907	Subjugation of Jambi	Dutch Empire	Jambi
1901	1901	French conquest of the Dendi Kingdom	France	Dendi Kingdom
1901	1903	Liberating Revolution (Venezuela)	Venezuela	Liberal revolutionaries
1901	1902	Anglo-Aro War	British Empire	Aro Confederacy
1901	1901	Battle of Holy Apostles Monastery	Armenian fedayi	Ottoman Empire
1901	1903	1901 Mapondera Rebellion	British Empire	Forces loyal to Kadungure Mapondera
1901	1936	Holy Man's Rebellion	French Indochina (Thailand) Siam	Phu Mi Bun Movement
1902	1902	Kala-i-Mor railway worker's revolt	Russian Empire	Rebel railway workers
1902	1902	Haitian Civil War of 1902	Haiti	Anténor Firmin's rebels
1902	1902	1902 Sudan revolt	British Empire: Anglo-Egyptian Sudan	Sudanese rebels
1902	1902	Merauke uprising	Dutch Empire	Marind rebels
1902	1904	Kuanhama Rebellion of 1902-1904	Portuguese Empire	Kuanhama
1902	1904	Bailundo revolt	Portuguese Empire	Ovimbundu Kingdoms; Kisanji; Luimbi
1902	1904	Ngiao Rebellion	(Thailand) Siam	Shan rebels
1902	1903	Venezuelan crisis of 1902–1903	German Empire; British Empire; Kingdom of Italy	United States of Venezuela
1902	1902	Kabul Khel expedition	British Empire: British Raj	Kabul Khel rebels
1902	1903	Expeditions against the Bantin (Location: Kalimantan)	Dutch Empire	Bantin
1902	1906	Korintji expeditions (Location: Sumatra)	Dutch Empire	Korintji
1902	1907	Campaigns against Dayak (Location: Kalimantan)	Dutch Empire	Dayak
1902	1902	Italian–Ottoman crisis of 1902	Kingdom of Italy	Ottoman Empire
1903	1903	Great Ming Uprising	Qing dynasty	Heavenly Kingdom of the Great Mingshun
1903	1903	1903 Tegale uprising	British Empire: Anglo-Egyptian Sudan	Muhammad al-Amin's rebel forces
1903	1903	1903 uprising in Bukhara	Russian Empire: Emirate of Bukhara	Anti-tax rebels
1903	1910	Risings among the Atwot Dinka	British Empire: Anglo-Egyptian Sudan	Atwot Dinka rebels
1903	1905	Rijal al-Ma rebellion	Ottoman Empire	Rijal al-Ma
1903	1903	Kavango uprising	German Empire: German South West Africa	Kavango rebels
1903	1903	Actions on Yapen	Dutch Empire	Tribes of Yapen
1903	1909	Resistance in Minangkabau	Dutch Empire	Anti-coffee rebels
1903	1910	Mentawei islands campaign	Dutch Empire	Anti-Dutch forces
1903	1916 (Solor) 1940 (Flores)	Military actions in Flores and Solor	Dutch Empire	Anti-Dutch forces
1903	1903	Kerinci Expedition	Dutch Empire	Anti-Dutch forces
1903	1903	Battle of Jo-Laban	Kuwait Emirate of Nejd and Hasa Arab tribes: Al-Muntafiq; Ajman tribe; Al Murrah; Subay'; Suhool; Al-Hawajir; Bani Khalid; Al-Awazem	Jabal Shammar: Mutayr
1903	1903	May Coup (Serbia)	Kingdom of Serbia	House of Obrenović
1903	1903	Ilinden–Preobrazhenie Uprising	Ottoman Empire	IMARO; SMAC; Kruševo Republic; Strandzha Republic
1903	1904	British expedition to Tibet	British Empire	Qing Dynasty: Tibet
1903	1904	British conquest of the Sokoto Caliphate	British Empire	Sokoto Caliphate
1903	1903	British conquest of the Kano Emirate	British Empire	Kano Emirate
1903	1907	First Saudi–Rashidi War Part of the Unification of Saudi Arabia	Emirate of Nejd and Hasa	Emirate of Ha'il; Ottoman Empire
1903	1903	Uprising of Namas in Maltahöhe	German Empire: German South West Africa	Nama rebels
1903	1904	Bondelswarts uprising of 1904	German Empire: German South West Africa	Bondelswarts
1904	1904	Adam Wad Muhammad's uprising	British Empire: Anglo-Egyptian Sudan	Adam Wad Muhammad's rebel forces
1904	1904	Mahsud expedition of 1904	British Empire: British Raj	Mahsud rebels
1904	1904	1904 Ondonga uprising	German Empire: German South West Africa	Ondonga rebels
1904	1909	1904 Nama uprising	German Empire: German South West Africa	Nama rebels
1904	1904	1904 Sudan revolt	British Empire: Anglo-Egyptian Sudan	Sudanese rebels
1904	1904	Campaign in the Gajo and Alas islandsPart of the Aceh War	Dutch Empire	Anti-Dutch forces
1904	1904	Dutch intervention in Bali (1904)	Dutch Empire	Anti-Dutch forces
1904	1904	Resistance on Tidore	Dutch Empire	Tidore
1904	1909	Sulawesi expeditions	Dutch Empire	Anti-Dutch forces
1904	1905	1904–1905 uprising in Madagascar	French Third Republic: Malagasy Catholics	Rebels: Malagasy Protestants
1904	1907	Portuguese campaign against the Ovambo (See Battle of Mufilo)	Portuguese Empire	Ovambo
1904	1904	Vaccine Revolt	First Brazilian Republic	Anti-vaccination rebels
1904	1904	Revolution of 1904	(Uruguay) Uruguayan government	National Party
1904	1904	1904 Sasun uprising	Ottoman Empire	Armenian fedayees
1904	1908	Herero Wars	German Empire	Herero and Nama peoples
1904	1905	Russo-Japanese War	Empire of Japan	Russian Empire
1904	1905	Yemeni Rebellion of 1904 Part of the Yemeni–Ottoman Conflicts	Zaidis	Ottoman Empire
1904	1908	Macedonian Struggle	Hellenic Macedonian Committee	Internal Macedonian Revolutionary Organization
1905	1905	Ping-liu-li Uprising	Qing dynasty	Rebels
1905	1906	Military actions in Onin	Dutch Empire	Anti-Dutch forces
1905	1905	Ottoman incursion into Persia	Ottoman Empire	Sublime State of Persia
1905	1911	Military actions Sumba and Sumbawa	Dutch Empire	Anti-Dutch forces
1905	1911	Persian Constitutional Revolution	The Revolution: June 1905 – August 1906: Secret Center; Social Democratic Party; Society of Humanity; Revolutionary Committee; Secret Society; Semi-organized groups: Ulama and seminary students; Committee of Merchants; Committee of Guild Elders; Students of Dar ul-Funun, School of Political Science and School of Agriculture; Struggle and Civil War: August 1906 – July 1909: Parliament; Tabriz Council; Society of Azerbaijanis; Central Society; Dashnak; Society of Guilds; Society of College Graduates	Qajar Iran; Nazmiyeh; Cossack Brigade; Qajar Iran; Cossack Brigade; Russian Empire; Shahsevans
1905	1905	Argentine Revolution of 1905	Argentina	Radical Civic Union
1905	1905	Shoubak Revolt of 1905	Ottoman Empire	Shoubakis
1905	1905	Łódź insurrection	Russian Empire	Polish worker militias
1905	1905	Kurdish rebellion of 1905	Ottoman Empire	Kurdish rebels
1905	1905	Theriso revolt	Ottoman Empire: Cretan State; Supported By: Russian Empire	(Kingdom of Greece) Cretan rebels
1905	1906	Batang uprising	(Qing dynasty) Qing Dynasty	Tibetan Buddhists
1905	1907	Russian Revolution of 1905	Russian Empire	Revolutionaries
1905	1907	Maji Maji Rebellion	German Empire	Indigenous rebels
1905	1906	Yemeni Expedition of 1905 Part of the Yemeni–Ottoman Conflicts	Zaidis	Ottoman Empire
1905	1905	South Sulawesi expeditions of 1905	The Netherlands	South Sulawesi kingdoms of Bone, Luwu and Wajo
1906	1906	Taba Crisis of 1906	British Empire	Ottoman Empire
1906	1907	Resistance in Lombok	Dutch Empire	Messianic rebels
1906	1908	Actions against fighters from Jambi in Indragiri (Location: Sumatra)	Dutch Empire	Jambi
1906	1906	Ottoman invasion of Persia (1906)	Ottoman Empire	Sublime State of Persia
1906	1906	Sokoto Uprising of 1906	British Empire	Rebels
1906	1906	1906 Mesopotamia uprising	Ottoman Empire	Mesopotamian tribesmen
1906	1906	Dutch intervention in Bali (1906)	The Netherlands	Badung; Tabanan; Klungkung
1906	1906	Bambatha Rebellion	British Empire	Zulu
1907	1907	Campaign against the Mahafaly	France	Onilahy (Mahafaly) kingdom
1907	1918	Asir rebellion	Idrisid Emirate of Asir Supported by: Kingdom of Italy (1911–1912) British Empire (1915–1918)	Ottoman Empire
1907	1907	Dersim uprising of 1907 Part of the Dersim uprisings	Ottoman Empire	Kurdish rebels
1907	1907	War of 1907	El Salvador	Nicaragua (El Salvador) Salvadoran exiles (United States) American filibusters Honduras
1907	1907	Huanggang Uprising	(Qing dynasty) Qing Dynasty	Rebels
1907	1907	Huizhou Qinühu Uprising	(Qing dynasty) Qing Dynasty	Rebels
1907	1907	Anqing Uprising	(Qing dynasty) Qing Dynasty	Rebels
1907	1907	Qinzhou Uprising	(Qing dynasty) Qing Dynasty	Rebels
1907	1907	Zhennanguan Uprising	(Qing dynasty) Qing Dynasty	Rebels
1907	1907	Bitlis uprising (1907)	Ottoman Empire	Kurdish rebels
1907	1910	Dembos War of 1907-1910; More info: Revoltas e Campanhas nos Dembos (1872–1919) (In Portuguese)	Portuguese Empire	Dembos
1907	1907	Anti-Foreign Revolt	France	Forces loyal to Sheika Ma Al-Ainine (Ma al-'Aynayn ?)
1907	1907	Mutair revolt	Emirate of Nejd and Hasa	Mutair tribe
1907	1907	1907 Romanian peasants' revolt	Kingdom of Romania	Romanian peasants
1907	1907	Honduran-Nicaraguan War	Nicaragua	Honduras
1907	1907	Beipu uprising	Empire of Japan	Hakka Saisiyat
1907	1907	1907 Diyarbakır uprising	Ottoman Empire: Ibrahim Pasha's autonomy in Viranşehir	Rebels of Diyarbakır
1907	1908	Zakka Khel raids on towns and villages in the British Raj	(United Kingdom) British Raj	Zakka Khel clan of the Afridi
1908	1908	Qin-lian Uprising	(Qing dynasty) Qing Dynasty	Rebels
1908	1908	Hekou Uprising	(Qing dynasty) Qing Dynasty	Rebels
1908	1908	Mapaoying Uprising	(Qing dynasty) Qing Dynasty	Rebels
1908	1909	Bondelswarts rebellion of 1908	German Empire: German South West Africa	Bondelswarts
1908	1908	Wad Habuba Revolt	British Empire	Neo-Mahdist rebels
1908	1909	Lobi and Dyula revolt in Mali	France	Lobi and Dyula rebels
1908	1914	Mossi rebellions in Kouddigou and Fada N'gourma	France	Mossi rebels
1908	1908	Annam uprising	France: French Indochina	Peasant rebels
1908	1908	Mohmand Expedition of 1908 Part of the instability on the North-West Frontier	(United Kingdom) British Raj	Mohmand rebels
1908	1908	Bazar Valley campaign	(United Kingdom) British Raj	Zakka Khel clan of the Afridi
1908	1908	Kurdish uprising of 1908 Part of the Dersim uprisings	Ottoman Empire	Kurdish rebels
1908	1908	Buraida rebellion	Emirate of Nejd and Hasa	Forces loyal to Muhammad Aba al-Kehil
1908	1908	Battle of Marrakech	Forces of Mulay Hafid	Forces of the Sultan of Morocco
1908	1909	Mau uprising	German Empire	Indigenous rebels
1908	1908	Young Turk Revolution	Young Turks	Ottoman Empire
1908	1910/1914	Hamawand rebellion	(Ottoman Empire) Young Turks (Until 24 July 1908) Ottoman Empire (From 24 July 1908)	Kurdish rebels: Hamawand tribe; Ottoman Empire (Abdul Hamid II loyalists) (Until 24 July 1908)
1908	1908	Dutch intervention in Bali (1908)	Dutch Empire	Karangasem; Klungkung; Gelgel
1908	1910	Actions in the Toba and Batak islands	Dutch Empire	Anti-Dutch forces
1908	1915	Actions in West-Kalimantan	Dutch Empire	Anti-Dutch forces
1908	1908	Dutch–Venezuelan crisis of 1908	Dutch Empire	Venezuela
1908	1908	Ngali War	Dutch Empire	Ngali People
1909	1909	1909 Battle of Al Jawf	Ruwallah tribe	Emirate of Ha'il
1909	1909	Nyasaland resistance	British Empire: Nyasaland	Rebels
1909	1909	Battle of Nias	Dutch Empire	Anti-Dutch forces
1909	1911	Actions on the Halmahera, Seram, Papua and Mentawei islands	Dutch Empire	Anti-Dutch forces
1909	1909	Kurdish uprising of 1909 Part of the Dersim uprisings	Ottoman Empire	Kurdish rebels
1909	1909	Estrada's rebellion	Nicaraguan Conservative Party	Nicaraguan Liberal Party (Government)
1909	1909	Kolašin Affair (1909)	Kingdom of Montenegro	Black Hand
1909	1910	Zaraniq rebellion (1909–1910)	Ottoman Empire	Zaraniq tribesmen
1909	1909	Crazy Snake Rebellion	United States	Creek
1909	1910	Second Melillan campaign	Spain	Riffian people
1909	1910	Hauran Druze Rebellion	Ottoman Empire	Druze rebels
1909	1911	Wadai War	France	Wadai Sultanate

== 1910–1919 ==
1910–1919
Start	Finish	Name of Conflict	Belligerents	
Start	Finish	Name of Conflict	Victorious party (if applicable)	Defeated party (if applicable)
1910	1910	Al-Bejat Revolution	Ottoman Empire	Al-Bejat clan
1910	1910	Gengxu New Army Uprising	Qing Dynasty	Rebels
1910	1910	1910 uprising in Bukhara	Russian Empire: Emirate of Bukhara	Rebels
1910	1910	Portuguese conquest of the Angoche Sultanate	Portugal: Mozambique	Angoche Sultanate
1910	1910	Uprising of Cape Nguni	German Empire: German South West Africa	Nguni rebels
1910	1912	Xiong Mi Chang's rebellion	France: French Indochina	Rebels loyal to Xiong Mi Chang
1910	1910	Actions on Ajer HItam and near Timor	Dutch Empire	Anti-Dutch forces
1910	1911	Actions in Langkat (Location: Sumatra)	Dutch Empire	Anti-Dutch forces
1910	1912	Portuguese conquest of the Kasanje Kingdom	Portugal: Angola	Kasanje Kingdom
1910	1910	Monégasque Revolution	Rebels	Monaco
1910	1910	Battle of Hadia	Kuwait Emirate of Nejd and Hasa	Al-Muntafiq
1910	1910	Karak Revolt	Ottoman Empire	Karakis
1910	1910	Bastar rebellion	British Empire	Tribal rebels
1910	1910	Albanian Revolt of 1910	Ottoman Empire	Albanian rebels
1910	1910	5 October 1910 revolution	(Portugal) Portuguese Republican Party	Kingdom of Portugal
1910	1910	Chinese expedition to Tibet (1910)	Qing Dynasty	Tibet
1910	1911	Sokehs Rebellion	German Empire	Sokehs rebels
1910	1920	Mexican Revolution	Maderistas; Orozquistas; Villistas; Zapatistas; Carrancistas; Magonistas; Seditionistas	Mexico
1910	1919	Border War (1910–19); Part of the Mexican Revolution	Constitutionalistas; United States (Mexico) Maderistas	(Mexico) Villistas (Mexico) Seditionistas (Mexico) Carrancistas
1910	1910	Revolts at Moush	Ottoman Empire	Kurdish rebels
1911	1911	Revolts at Khuyt	Ottoman Empire	Kurdish rebels
1911	1911	1911 Kenya revolt	British Empire	Forces loyal to Siume (a priestess) and Kiamba (a young man)
1911	1911	Belitung miner's revolt	Dutch Empire	Miner rebels
1911	1911	Kurdish uprising of 1911 Part of the Dersim uprisings	Ottoman Empire	Kurdish rebels
1911	1913	Revolt of Salar-al-Daulah	Sublime State of Persia	Forces of Salar-al-Daulah
1911	1911	Revolt of Mohammad Ali Shah Qajar	Sublime State of Persia	Forces of Mohammad Ali Shah Qajar
1911	1911	Magonista rebellion of 1911; Part of the Mexican Revolution	Mexico	Mexican Liberal Party
1911	1912	Paraguayan Civil War (1911–1912)	Liberal Party	(Paraguay) Paraguayan government
1911	1911	Russian Invasion of Tabriz; Part of the Persian Constitutional Revolution	Russian Empire	Persian Constitutionalists
1911	1911	Albanian Revolt of 1911	Ottoman Empire	Albanian Malësorë (highlanders) and Catholic tribes from Scutari Vilayet
1911	1911	Second Guangzhou Uprising	Qing Dynasty	Anti-Qing rebels
1911	1912	Dominican Civil War (1911–12)	Dominican Republic	Dominican Army conspirators
1911	1912	French conquest of Morocco	France	Morocco
1911	1912	Italo-Turkish War	Kingdom of Italy	Ottoman Empire
1911	1912	East Timorese Rebellion	Portuguese Empire	East Timorese rebels
1911	1912	Xinhai Revolution; 1911 Revolution	Tongmenghui	Qing Dynasty
1911	1912	War of the Generals	Liberal rebels	Ecuador (Eloy Alfaro loyalists)
1912	1912	1912 Kordofan uprising	British Empire: Anglo-Egyptian Sudan	Faki Najm al-Din's forces
1912	1912	Turkoman Revolt of 1912–1913	Russian Empire: Khiva	Yomud Turkomans
1912	1914	Ecuadorian Civil War of 1912–1914	Ecuador	Rebels of Esmeraldas Province
c. 1912	c. 1912	Sirte revolt	Kingdom of Italy	Rebels loyal to Ramadan Asswehly
1912	1912	Khost rebellion (1912)	Emirate of Afghanistan	Rebel tribes: Mangal; Jadran; Ghilzai
1912	1913	First Balkan War	Kingdom of Bulgaria; Kingdom of Greece; Kingdom of Serbia; Kingdom of Montenegro	Ottoman Empire
1912	1912	Albanian Revolt of 1912	Albanian rebels	Ottoman Empire
1912	1916	Contestado War	(Brazil) Brazilian Governists	Contestado
1912	1933	United States occupation of Nicaragua; Part of the Banana Wars	United States	Nicaraguan rebels
1912	1912	Royalist attack on Chaves	(Portugal) Portuguese First Republic	(Portugal) Portuguese Royalists
1912	1912	Negro Rebellion; Part of the Banana Wars	Cuba; United States	Independent Party of Color
1913	1913	1913 uprising in Bukhara	Russian Empire: Emirate of Bukhara	Rebels
1913	1913	Oyango Dande rebellion	British Empire	Oyango Dande
1913	1913	Kurdish revolt of 1913	Ottoman Empire	Kurdish rebels
1913	1913	1913 Euphrates rebellion	Ottoman Empire	Al-Fatlah tribe
1913	1920	Muscat rebellion	British Empire: Muscat and Oman	Imamate of Oman
1913	1915	Sino–Mongolian War of 1913–1915	(Republic of China (1912–1949)) Republic of China	Bogd Khanate of Mongolia
1913	1913	Urtatagai conflict (1913)	Russian Empire	Emirate of Afghanistan
1913	1913	Atmene uprising	Russian Empire	Peasants
1913	1913	Conquest of al-Hasa Part of the Unification of Saudi Arabia	Emirate of Nejd and Hasa	Ottoman Empire
1913	1913	Second Balkan War	Ottoman Empire; Kingdom of Greece; Kingdom of Serbia; Kingdom of Montenegro; Kingdom of Romania	Kingdom of Bulgaria
1913	1913	Tikveš Uprising; Part of the Second Balkan War	Kingdom of Serbia	Internal Macedonian Revolutionary Organization
1913	1913	Ohrid–Debar Uprising	Kingdom of Serbia	Internal Macedonian Revolutionary Organization
1913	1913	Second Revolution	(Republic of China (1912–1949)) Beiyang Government	Sun Yat-sen (Republic of China (1912–1949)) southern China provinces
1913	1914	Bai Lang Rebellion	(Republic of China (1912–1949)) Republic of China; Jahriyya menhuan Xidaotang	(Republic of China (1912–1949)) Gelaohui
1914	1914	1914 Kenya revolt	British Empire	Giriama rebels
1914	1914	North Java peasant revolt	Dutch Empire	Peasant rebels
1914	1914	Kolongongo War; More info: The Mbunda Kingdom in Angola (Section "Kolongongo war")	Portugal: Angola	Mbunda Kingdom
1914	1914	First Yemeni–Asiri war	Ottoman Empire: Autonomous Yemeni Imamate	Idrisid Emirate of Asir
1914	1914	Dersim uprising of 1914; Part of the Dersim uprisings	Ottoman Empire	Kurdish rebels
1914	1914	Bitlis uprising	Ottoman Empire	Kurdish rebels Supported by: Russian Empire
1914	1914	Uprising in Barzan	Ottoman Empire	Kurdish rebels loyal to Abdülselam Barzani Supported by: Russian Empire
1914	1917	Kongo revolt of 1914	Portugal: Angola (1914); Congo (1914-1917)	Kingdom of Kongo (1914) Various rebel groups (1914–1917)
1914	1914	Operations in the Tochi Part of the instability on the North-West Frontier	British Empire	Rebel tribesmen from Khost
1914	1914	Revolt of Juazeiro	First Brazilian Republic	Rebels
1914	1921	Zaian War	France	Zaian Confederation
1914	1914	Dominican Civil War of 1914	Rebels	Dominican Republic
1914	1914	Haitian Civil War		
1914	1914	Blayong's uprising	British Empire: North Borneo	Murut rebels
1914	1914	Peasant Revolt in Albania	Albania (Romania) Romanian volunteers (Austria-Hungary) Austro-Hungarian volunteers Kosovar Albanian units	(Ottoman Empire) Albanian Muslim pro-Ottoman rebels
1914	1914	Truku War	Empire of Japan	Truku Tribe
1914	1918	World War I	Allied Powers: British Empire; France; Russia (until 1917); Serbia; Belgium; Montenegro; Japan; Italy (from 1915); United States (from 1917); Romania (1916–18); Portugal (from 1916); Hejaz (from 1916); China (from 1917); Greece (from 1917); Siam (from 1917); ...and others	Central Powers: German Empire; Austria-Hungary; Ottoman Empire; Bulgaria (from 1915); ...and co-belligerents
1914	1914	United States occupation of Veracruz; Part of the Banana Wars	United States	Mexico
1914	1915	Bluff War	United States	Ute; Paiute
1914	1917	Ovambo Uprising	Portugal: (Portugal) Portuguese Angola; United Kingdom: South Africa (from 1915)	Ovambo
1914	1915	Maritz Rebellion	Union of South Africa	South African Republic
1915	1915	1915 Rehoboth Basters rebellion	German Empire: German South West Africa	Rehoboth Basters
1915	1918	Second Saudi-Rashidi War	Emirate of Nejd and Hasa	Emirate of Jabal Shammar; Ottoman Empire
1915	1917	Sadiavahe rebellion	France: Colony of Madagascar and Dependencies	Sadiavahe movement
1915	1915	Kru Coast Rebellion	Liberia	Kru rebels
1915	1915	Botan revolt	Ottoman Empire	Kurdish rebels
1915	1915	Tapani incident	Empire of Japan	Han Taiwanese Taiwanese aborigines
1915	1915	Turkoman Revolt of 1915	Russian Empire: Khiva	Yomud Turkomans
1915	1915	Battle of Kanzaan (1915)	Nejd and Hasa	Ajman tribe
1915	1915	Battle of Jarrab Part of the Unification of Saudi Arabia and World War I	Emirate of Ha'il	Emirate of Nejd and Hasa
1915	1915	Chilembwe uprising	British Empire	Nyasaland rebels
1915	1915	Bussa rebellion	British Empire	Bussa warriors
1915	1915	1915 Singapore Mutiny	British Empire	5th Native Light Infantry sepoys
1915	1915	Kelantan rebellion	British Empire	Tok Janggut's rebel forces
1915	1915	Rundum revolt	British Empire	Antanum's rebel forces
1915	1916	Volta-Bani War	France	Tribal insurgents
1915	?	Somba rebellion		Tammari people
1915	1916	National Protection War; Anti-Monarchy War	Republic of China	Empire of China
1915	1916	Gallipoli campaign Part of World War I	Ottoman Empire	United Kingdom France
1915	1917	Senussi Campaign; Part of World War I	British Empire; Kingdom of Italy	Senussi; Ottoman Empire; Darfur Emirate
1915	1934	United States occupation of Haiti; Part of the Banana Wars	United States	Haiti
1916	1916	Jambi uprising	Dutch Empire	Indonesian rebels in Sumatra
1915	1915	Operations against the Mohmands, Bunerwals and Swatis in 1915 Part of the instability on the North-West Frontier	British Empire	Rebel tribes: Mohmands; Bunerwals; Swatis
1915	1916	Kalat Operations (1915-16)	British Empire	Kalat tribesmen
1916	1934	Yarahmadzai uprising	British Empire; Sublime State of Persia	Yarahmadzai tribe
1916	1916	Dersim uprising of 1916 Part of the Dersim uprisings	Ottoman Empire	Kurdish rebels
1916	1916	1916 Kumyk uprising	Russian Empire	Kumyk rebels
1916	1917	Mohmand blockade Part of the instability on the North-West Frontier	British Empire	Mohmands
1916	1918	Cuban Civil War (See Sugar Intervention)	(Cuba) Mario García Menocal loyalists United States	(Cuba) Pro-José Miguel Gómez rebels
1916	1917	Kaocen Revolt	France	Tuareg guerrillas
1916	1916	1916 Cochinchina uprising	France	Cochinchina rebels
1916	1916	Battle of Segale	Regents of Ethiopia	Lij Iyasu loyalists
1916	1916	Noemvriana	Kingdom of Greece	United Kingdom; France
1916	1916	Central Asian revolt of 1916	Russian Empire	Rebels
1916	1916	Easter Rising	(United Kingdom) British Army; Dublin Metropolitan Police; Royal Irish Constabulary	(Republic of Ireland) Irish Republican Brotherhood; Irish Volunteers; Irish Citizen Army; Cumann na mBan; Hibernian Rifles; Fianna Éireann
1916	1924	United States occupation of the Dominican Republic (1916–24); Part of the Banana Wars	United States	Dominican rebels
1916	1918	Arab Revolt; Part of World War I	(Arab Revolt) Hashemite Arabs; United Kingdom Sultanate of Nejd (Unification of Saudi Arabia)	Ottoman Empire
1916	1934	Basmachi movement Part of World War I and Russian Civil War	Russian Empire (1916–17) (Russia) Russian Republic (1917) Russian SFSR: Turkestan ASSR; Khorezm SSR; Bukharan PSR Soviet Union (From December 30, 1922)	Basmachi Khiva (1918–20) (Russia) White Army (1919–20); Bukhara (1920); Supported by: Emirate of Afghanistan (Until mid-1922) Afghanistan (1929)
1917	1917	Uukwanyama rebellion	British Empire: South Africa	Uukwanyama rebels
1917	1917	Mueda campaign	(First Portuguese Republic) Portuguese Republic	Makonde tribes
1917	1917	1917 Uganda rebellion	British Empire	Forces loyal to Rembe
1917	1917	Kurdish uprisings of 1917	Ottoman Empire	Kurdish rebels Supported by: Russian Empire
1917	1917	February Revolution	(Russia) Russian revolutionaries	Russian Empire
1917	1917	July Days	(Russia) Russian Provisional Government	Bolshevik Party
1917	1917	Operations against the Mahsuds (1917)	British Empire	Mahsud rebels
1917	1917	Manchu Restoration	Republic of China	Monarchist rebels
1917	1917	Thái Nguyên uprising	(France) French colonial empire	Vietnamese rebels
1917	1917	Polubotkivtsi Uprising	(Russia) Russian Provisional Government	Ukrainian separatists
1917	1917	Toplica insurrection	Kingdom of Bulgaria	Chetniks
1917	1918	1917 Kanak revolt	(France) French colonial empire: New Caledonia	Kanak rebels
1917	1917	Kornilov Affair	(Russia) Russian Provisional Government	Soldiers under Lavr Kornilov
1917	1917	Green Corn Rebellion	United States	Anti-draft rebels
1917	1917	October Revolution; Part of Russian Civil War	Bolsheviks	(Russia) Russian Provisional Government
1917	1917	Kerensky–Krasnov uprising Part of Russian Civil War	Russian SFSR	(Russia) Rebels under Alexander Kerensky
1917	1922	Russian Civil War	Victorious in Russia, Ukraine, Georgia, Armenia, Azerbaijan, Kazakhstan, and Mongolia: Russian SFSR; Other Soviet republics Mongolian People's Party Victorious in their respective countries: Kingdom of Finland; Republic of Estonia; Republic of Latvia; Republic of Lithuania (Poland) Second Polish Republic	(Russian Empire) White Movement Central Powers (until 1918): Austro-Hungarian Empire; German Empire; Ottoman Empire; Allied Forces (from 1918): Czechoslovakia (Republic of China (1912–1949)) Republic of China; France; Kingdom of Greece; Kingdom of Italy; Empire of Japan; Poland; Kingdom of Romania; Kingdom of Serbia; United Kingdom: Australia; Canada; United States; Other combatants: Revolutionary Insurrectionary Army of Ukraine; Ukrainian People's Republic; Democratic Republic of Georgia; Democratic Republic of Armenia; Various pro-independence movements
1917	1922	Constitutional Protection Movement	(Republic of China (1912–1949)) Beiyang Government	(Republic of China (1912–1949)) Guangzhou Military Government
1917	1921	Ukrainian War of Independence; Part of World War I and Russian Civil War	Ukrainian SSR; Russian SFSR	Ukrainian People's Republic West Ukrainian People's Republic; White Movement
1917	1949	Ngolok rebellions (1917–49)	(Taiwan) Republic of China	Ngolok tribesmen
1918	1918	Operations against the Marri and Khetran tribes (1918); Part of the instability on the North-West Frontier	British Empire	Marri and Khetran tribesmen
1918	1918	Adubi War	British Empire	Egba rebels
1918	1922	Simko Shikak revolt (1918–22)	Iran: Qajars (1919–1921); Pahlavis (1921–1922)	Rebels: Irregular Kurdish militias; Ottoman soldiers and mercenaries
1918	1918	Judenburg mutiny Part of World War I	Austria-Hungary	17th Infantry Regiment
1918	1918	Cattaro Mutiny; Part of World War I	Austria-Hungary	Elements of the Austro-Hungarian Navy
1918	1918	Aster Revolution; Part of World War I	Hungarian National Council	Austria-Hungary
1918	1918	Radomir Rebellion; Part of World War I	Kingdom of Bulgaria	Bulgarian Agrarian National Union
1918	1918	Left SR uprising Part of the Russian Civil War	Russian SFSR	Left Socialist Revolutionary Party
1918	1918	Finnish Civil War	Finnish White Guards; German Empire	Finnish Red Guards; Russian SFSR
1918	1918	Georgian–Armenian War	First Republic of Armenia	Democratic Republic of Georgia
1918	1958	Polish–Czechoslovak border conflicts	Second Polish Republic	First Czechoslovak Republic (until 1938); Second Czechoslovak Republic (1938–1939); First Slovak Republic (1939–1945); Third Czechoslovak Republic (1945–1948); Czechoslovak Socialist Republic (1948–1958)
1918	1918	Internal conflict in the Banat Republic	Banat Republic	Serb National Council at Timișoara; Serb National Council at Pančevo; Timișoara Citizens' Guard; "Octobrists"; Green Cadres; Socialist rebels; Romanian rebels
1918	1918	Serbian incursion into the Banat Republic	Kingdom of Serbia	Banat Republic
1918	1918	Viena expedition	(Russian Soviet Federative Socialist Republic) Russian SFSR; Finnish Red Guards; United Kingdom	Finnish White Guards; Finnish Jäger troops
1918	1918	First Pechenga expedition	(Russian Soviet Federative Socialist Republic) Russian SFSR; Finnish Red Guards; Murmansk Legion	Finnish volunteers
1918	1919	Austro-Slovene conflict in Carinthia	State of Slovenes, Croats and Serbs; Kingdom of Yugoslavia	Republic of German-Austria
1918	1919	German Revolution of 1918–19	Weimar Republic: Reichswehr; Social Democratic Party of Germany	Royalist Forces: German Empire (1918): Imperial German Army; Communist Forces: Bavarian Soviet Republic; Spartacus League; German Communist movements
1918	1919	Greater Poland Uprising (1918–19)	Poland	German Empire
1918	1919	Hungarian–Czechoslovak War	First Hungarian Republic; Hungarian Soviet Republic	(Czechoslovakia) First Czechoslovak Republic
1918	1919	Polish–Ukrainian War; Part of the Ukrainian War of Independence	Poland	(Ukraine) West Ukrainian People's Republic
1918	1920	Georgian–Ossetian conflict (1918–20); Part of the Russian Civil War	Transcaucasian Democratic Federative Republic Democratic Republic of Georgia	Pro-Bolshevik Ossetian rebels
1918	1919	Sochi conflict Part of the Russian Civil War	(Russia) White movement Kuban-Black Sea Soviet Republic	Democratic Republic of Georgia
1918	1920	Armenian–Azerbaijani War; Part of the Russian Civil War	First Republic of Armenia (Republic of Artsakh) Republic of Mountainous Armenia (Republic of Artsakh) Nagorno-Karabakh rebels British Empire (1918 only); Centrocaspian Dictatorship (1918 only)	Azerbaijan Democratic Republic Ottoman Empire (1918 only); Russian SFSR (from April 1920); Turkish National Movement (from April 1920)
1918	1920	Estonian War of Independence; Part of the Russian Civil War	Estonia White Russia; Latvia; United Kingdom; Ingria (German Empire) Ober Ost; Finnish, Swedish and Danish volunteers	Russian SFSR Commune of Estonia; Latvian SSR
1918	1920	Latvian War of Independence; Part of the Russian Civil War	Latvia Estonia; Poland; United Kingdom; France	Russian SFSR Latvian SSR
1918	1919	Lithuanian–Soviet War; Part of the Lithuanian Wars of Independence	Lithuania; Saxon volunteers	Russian Soviet Federative Socialist Republic; Lithuanian-Belorussian Soviet Socialist Republic
1918	1919	Al-Khurma dispute Part of the Unification of Saudi Arabia	Emirate of Riyadh	Kingdom of Hejaz
1918	1921	War of the Insane	French Indochina	Hmong rebels
1918	1920	Revolt of the Ingrian Finns	Russian SFSR	North Ingria; Finnish volunteers
1918	1921	Franco-Turkish War; Part of the Turkish War of Independence	Turkish National Movement	(French Third Republic) France; French Armenian Legion
1919	1934	Anglo-Yemeni War	Kingdom of Yemen; Dhala (until November 1919)	British Empire; Aden Protectorate; Dhala (from November 1919); Other British clients; Baidah; Na'wah; Rubeaten; Juban
1919	1923	Second Yemeni–Asiri War	Idrisid Emirate of Asir Supported by: British Empire	Mutawakkilite Kingdom of Yemen
1919	1919	Toli-Toli incident	Dutch Empire	Anti-Dutch forces
1919	1919	Garut incident	Dutch Empire	Anti-Dutch forces
1919	1919	Punjab Rebellion (See: Amritsar Massacre) Part of the instability on the North-West Frontier	British Empire	Rebels
1919	1919	Black Sea mutiny	France	Mutineers
1919	1919	1919 Royalist uprising in Northern Portugal	First Portuguese Republic	(Kingdom of Portugal) Monarchy of the North
1919	1919	Christmas Uprising	Montenegrin Whites; Kingdom of Yugoslavia	(Kingdom of Montenegro) Montenegrin Greens; Kingdom of Italy
1919	1919	Spartacist uprising Part of the German Revolution of 1918–19	(Germany) Interim government: Freikorps	Communist Party of Germany: Spartacus League; Independent Social Democratic Party of Germany
1919	1919	Lithuanian War of Independence (War against the Bermontians); Part of the Lithuanian Wars of Independence	Lithuania	(Russia) West Russian Volunteer Army
1919	1919	Sejny Uprising	(Poland) Polish Military Organization (PMO) (Poland) 41st Infantry Regiment	(Lithuania) Lithuanian Sejny Command (Lithuania) 1st Reserve Battalion
1919	1919	First Barzanji Revolt	British Empire	Kurdish Tribesmen
1919	1919	Polish–Czechoslovak War; Part of the Polish–Czechoslovak border conflicts	Czechoslovakia	(Poland) Second Polish Republic
1919	1919	Khotyn Uprising	Romania	Ukrainian rebels
1919	1919	Hungarian–Romanian war of 1919	Romania	First Hungarian Republic (until 21 March 1919); Hungarian Soviet Republic
1919	1922 (Armistice) 1923 (Treaty)	Turkish War of Independence	Turkish National Movement: Grand National Assembly (after 1920); Kuva-yi Nizamiye; Kuva-yi Milliye (until 1920); Supported by: Russian SFSR	Greece (French Third Republic) France; Armenia (in 1920); United Kingdom; Ottoman Empire (until 1922): Kuva-yi Inzibatiye (in 1920); Italy; Georgia (in 1921)
1919	1919	Third Anglo-Afghan War	Afghanistan	British Empire India
1919	1920	Waziristan campaign (1919–1920)	British Empire: India	Waziristan
1919	1919	Impresa di Fiume	Forces loyal to Gabriele D'Annunzio	(United States) (United Kingdom) (French Third Republic) American, British and French occupying forces
1919	1920	Italo-Yugoslav War	Kingdom of Italy Free State of Fiume	Kingdom of Serbs, Croats and Slovenes
1919	1919	First Honduran Civil War	Rebels	Honduras
1919	1921	Polish–Soviet War	Republic of Poland (Ukraine) Ukrainian People's Republic	Russian SFSR Ukrainian SSR
1919	1919	First Silesian Uprising; Part of the Silesian Uprisings	Weimar Republic	(Poland) Silesian Rebels
1919	1919	Aunus expedition	Russian SFSR; Finnish Red Guards	Finnish White Guards; Finnish Jäger troops
1919	1920	Alawite Revolt of 1919	France	Syrian insurgents
1919	1921	Irish War of Independence	(Republic of Ireland) Irish Republic	United Kingdom
1919	1920	Kuwait–Najd War	Kuwait; British Empire	Ikhwan; Bedouins
1919	1922	Greco-Turkish War (1919–1922); Part of the Turkish War of Independence	Turkish National Movement; Supported by: Russian SFSR	Kingdom of Greece; Supported by: United Kingdom; Armenian volunteers
1919	1923	Revolts during the Turkish War of Independence	Turkish National Movement	Ottoman Empire: Kuva-yi Inzibatiye (in 1920); Pontic rebels Milli tribe Koçgiri tribe Rebels of Ethem the Circassian (1920–1921)

== 1920–1929 ==
1920–1929
Start	Finish	Name of Conflict	Belligerents	
Start	Finish	Name of Conflict	Victorious party (if applicable)	Defeated party (if applicable)
1920	1920	Franco-Syrian War	France; French Syria	(Arab Revolt) Syrian rebels
1920	1920	1920 uprising in Afghanistan	Afghanistan	Safi regiment
1920	1920	Misurata-Warfala War	Warfallan tribesmen	Tripolitanian Republic
1920	1920	Husino rebellion	Kingdom of Serbs, Croats and Slovenes	Bosnian miners
1920	1920	1920 Iraqi Revolt	British Empire	Iraqi rebels
1920	1920	Vlora War	Principality of Albania	Kingdom of Italy
1920	1922	1920–1922 Jabal al-Gharbi civil war	Tribal fighters	Tribal fighters
1920	1920	Polish–Lithuanian War; Part of the Lithuanian Wars of Independence	Poland	Lithuania
1920	1920	Kapp Putsch	Weimar Republic	Far-right Freikorps
1920	1920	Ruhr Uprising	Weimar Republic; Freikorps	Red Ruhr Army
1920	1920	Second Silesian Uprising; Part of the Silesian Uprisings	Weimar Republic	(Poland) German civil government and police of Upper Silesia
1920	1920	1920 Georgian coup attempt	Democratic Republic of Georgia	Georgian Bolsheviks
1920	1920	May Uprising	First Republic of Armenia; Armenian Revolutionary Federation	Armenian Bolsheviks; Muslims of Armenia
1920	1920	Turkish–Armenian War; Part of the Turkish War of Independence	Turkish National Movement; Russian SFSR	First Republic of Armenia
1920	1920	Zhili–Anhui War Part of the Warlord Era	(Republic of China (1912–1949)) Zhili clique Fengtian clique	(Republic of China (1912–1949)) Anhui clique
1920	1920	Second Pechenga expedition	Russian SFSR; Finnish Red Guards; Murmansk Legion	Finnish volunteers
1920	1921	Guangdong–Guangxi War Part of the Warlord Era	(Republic of China (1912–1949)) Old Guangxi clique	(Republic of China (1912–1949)) Chinese Revolutionary Party
1920	1920	Qing dynasty Restorationists in Dingxi	Beiyang government	Qing Restorationists
1920	1921	Dagestan Uprising; Part of the Russian Civil War	Russian SFSR	Dagestani rebels
1920	1926	Rif War	France Spain	Rif Republic
1920	1920	Invasion of Upper Asir	Sultanate of Nejd Idrisid Emirate of Asir	Sheikdom of Upper Asir
1921	1921	1921 Khorosan rebellion	Iran	Autonomous Government of Khorasan
1921	1921	Kurdish uprising of Autumn 1921	Turkey	Anti-Kemalist Kurdish rebels
1921	1921	Waziristan campaign (1921–1924)	British Empire: India	Waziristan
1921	1921	Anti-fascist uprising in Albona	Kingdom of Italy	Albona Republic
1921	1921	Red Army invasion of Georgia; Part of the Russian Civil War	Russian SFSR; Turkey	Democratic Republic of Georgia
1921	1921	Kronstadt rebellion Part of the Russian Civil War	Russian SFSR	Anarchist sailors
1921	1921	February Uprising; Part of the Russian Civil War	(Soviet Union) Revolutionary committee (Revkom) of Armenia	Armenian Revolutionary Federation
1921	1921	Coto War	Costa Rica	Panama
1921	1921	Battle of Mountainous Armenia; Part of the Russian Civil War	Armenia	Russian SFSR; Turkey; Azerbaijan SSR
1921	1921	March Action	Weimar Republic	Communist Party of Germany; Communist Workers' Party of Germany
1921	1921	Third Silesian Uprising; Part of the Silesian Uprisings	Weimar Republic	Silesian rebels Poland
1921	1921	Mongolian Revolution of 1921; Part of Russian Civil War	Mongolian Communists; Russian SFSR	Bogd Khaanate; White Movement
1921	1921	Charles I of Austria's attempts to retake the throne of Hungary	Regentists	Loyalists
1921	1921	Uprising in West Hungary	Austria; Hungary	Rongyos Gárda; Lajtabánság; Bosnian and Albanian Muslim volunteers
1921	1921	Malabar rebellion	British Empire	Khilafat Movement
1921	1921	1921 Persian coup d'etat	Persian Cossack Brigade	Iranian Qajar police Jangalis; Simko Kurdish rebels Colonel Pesian's forces supported by: Soviet Union
1921	1921	Conquest of Ha'il	Sultanate of Nejd	Emirate of Ha'il
1921	1922	East Karelian Uprising and Soviet–Finnish conflict 1921–22; Part of Russian Civil War	Russian SFSR	Finnish and East Karelian rebels
1921	1922	Rand Rebellion	Union of South Africa	Miners; South African Communist Party; Syndicalists
1921	1923	Kura Rebellion	United Kingdom (Jordan) Emir Abdullah	(Jordan) Sheikh Kulaib
1921	1921	Ikhwan attack on Najran	Ikhwan	Principality of Najran
1922	1922	18 of the Copacabana Fort revolt	First Brazilian Republic	Tenentista movement
1922	1922	1922 bombardment of Yemen	British Empire: (United Kingdom) British RAF	Mutawakkilite Kingdom of Yemen
1922	1924	Ikhwan raids on Transjordan	(United Kingdom) British RAF (Jordan) Pro-Hashemite tribesmen: Adwan; Ajarma; Abbad; Bani Hasan; Bani Hamaida; Bani Sakhr; Hadid	Ikhwan ('Utaybah tribe)
1922	1922	Bondelswarts Rebellion	Union of South Africa: South West Africa	Bondelswarts
1922	1922	San rebellion	Union of South Africa	San rebels
1922	1922	1922 Uukwambi revolt	Union of South Africa	Uukwambi rebels
1922	1922	First Zhili–Fengtian War Part of the Warlord Era	(Republic of China (1912–1949)) Zhili clique	Fengtian clique
1922	1924	Rampa Rebellion of 1922	British Empire: British Raj	Rebel forces loyal to Alluri Sitarama Raju
1922	1922	11 September 1922 Revolution	Venizelist rebels	Kingdom of Greece
1922	1923	Irish Civil War	(Republic of Ireland) Pro-treaty forces	(Republic of Ireland) Anti-treaty forces
1922	1923	Paraguayan Civil War (1922–1923)	(Paraguay) Gondrists	(Paraguay) Schaererists
1922	1924	Sheikh Khazal rebellion Part of the Arab separatism in Khuzestan	Sublime State of Persia	Sheikhdom of Mohammerah; Bakhtiari Tribesmen
1922	1924	Second Barzanji Revolt	British Empire; Kingdom of Iraq (British administration)	Kingdom of Kurdistan
1922	1927	Tenente revolts	First Brazilian Republic	Tenentismo; Brazilian Communist Party
1923	1941	Aden Protectorate Insurgency	British Empire: Aden Protectorate	Rebel tribes: Makhdumi; Mansuri; Hukais; Subayhi; Ahl Ma'ir; Qutaybi; Mawsata; Shayri; Ahl Haydara; Hamumi
1923	1923	Alizai rebellion of 1923	Emirate of Afghanistan	Alizai
1923	1923	Corfu incident	Kingdom of Italy	Kingdom of Greece
1923	1923	De la Huerta Rebellion	Mexican government	Forces loyal to Adolfo de la Huerta
1923	1923	June Uprising	Bulgaria; IMRO; Shpitskomandi	Bulgarian Communist Party; Bulgarian Agrarian National Union; Anarchists
1923	1923	Leonardopoulos–Gargalidis coup d'état attempt	Kingdom of Greece	Monarchist rebels
1923	1923	Adwan Rebellion	United Kingdom (Jordan) Emir Abdullah's forces (Jordan) Hashemite allied tribesmen	(Jordan) Sultan al-Adwan's forces
1923	1923	Posey War	United States	Ute; Paiute
1923	1923	Hamburg Uprising	Weimar Republic	Communist Party of Germany
1923	1923	Beer Hall Putsch	Weimar Republic	Nazi Party
1923	1923	Klaipėda Revolt	Lithuania	French Third Republic
1923	1923	September Uprising	Bulgaria; IMRO; Shpitskomandi	Bulgarian Communist Party; Bulgarian Agrarian National Union; Anarchists
1923	1932	Pacification of Libya	Kingdom of Italy	Senussi Order
1923	Ongoing	Arab separatism in Khuzestan	Sublime State of Iran (1922–1924); Imperial State of Iran (1925–1979); Islamic Republic of Iran (1979–present)	Sheikhdom of Mohammerah (1922–1924); DRFLA (1979–1980); APCO; PFLA; AFLA; ASMLA; Iranian Arab protesters
1924	1925	Chechen uprising of 1924	Soviet Union	Chechen rebels
1924	1925	Turkoman Rebellion in Eastern Iran	(Iran) Sublime State of Persia	Turkmen rebels
1924	1924	São Paulo Revolt of 1924	First Brazilian Republic	Tenentista movement
1924	1924	Beytüşşebab rebellion	Turkey	Kurdish rebels
1924	1924	Zazejskie uprising	Soviet Union	Amur Cossack Host; White Movement
1924	1924	Second Honduran Civil War	Rebels	Honduras
1924	1925	Khost rebellion (1924–1925)	Emirate of Afghanistan Allied tribes: Khogyani; Shinwari	Rebel tribes: Mangal; Alikhel; Sulaimankhel; Jaji; Jadran; Ahmadzai
1924	1928	1924–1928 Saqqawist insurgency in Afghanistan Escalated into the Afghan Civil War	Saqqawists	Emirate of Afghanistan
1924	1924	Vaalgras revolt	Union of South Africa	Vaalgras
1924	1924	August Uprising	Soviet Union	Committee for Independence of Georgia
1924	1925	Tungus uprising	Soviet Union	Tungus Republic; White Movement
1924	1924	June Revolution	Faction of Fan Noli	Principality of Albania
1924	1924	1924 Estonian coup d'état attempt	Estonia	Comintern
1924	1924	Tatarbunary Uprising	Romania	Soviet Union
1924	1925	Saudi conquest of Hejaz	Sultanate of Nejd; British Empire	Kingdom of Hejaz
1924	1924	Nestorian rebellion	Turkey	Nestorians
1924	1924	Second Zhili–Fengtian War Part of the Warlord Era	Fengtian clique	(Republic of China (1912–1949)) Zhili clique
1924	1926	Third Yemeni–Asiri War	Mutawakkilite Kingdom of Yemen	Idrisid Emirate of Asir
1924	1924	First Asiri Civil War	Idrisid Emirate of Asir (Sayyid Ali ibn Muhammad al-Idrisi loyalists)	Rebels led by Mustafa
1925	1925	1925 Rehoboth Basters rebellion	Union of South Africa	Rehoboth Basters
1925	1925	Incident at Petrich	Kingdom of Bulgaria	Kingdom of Greece
1925	1925	Guna Revolution	Panama	Guna rebels
1925	1925	Sheikh Said rebellion	Turkey	Kurdish tribesmen
1925	1925	Pink's War	United Kingdom	Mahsud tribesmen
1925	1925	Raçkotan and Raman pacifying operations	Turkey	Kurdish rebels
1925	1937	Sason rebellion	Turkey	Kurdish rebels
1925	1929	Zaraniq rebellion (1925–1929)	Mutawakkilite Kingdom of Yemen	Zaraniq tribe Supported by: Kingdom of Hejaz and Nejd; United Kingdom
1925	1927	Great Syrian Revolt	France	Syrian rebels
1925	1926	Anti-Fengtian War Part of the Warlord Era	Fengtian clique (Republic of China (1912–1949)) Zhili clique (from February 1918)	(Republic of China (1912–1949)) Guominjun (Republic of China (1912–1949)) Zhili clique (until February 1918)
1925	1926	Urtatagai conflict	Soviet Union	Emirate of Afghanistan
1925	1926	Second Asiri Civil war	Rebels led by Sayyid al-Hasan ibn Ali al-Idrisial-Hasani Supported by: Sultanate of Nejd	Idrisid Emirate of Asir (Sayyid Ali ibn Muhammad al-Idrisi loyalists)
1926	1926	Asiri tribal revolts of 1926	Idrisid Emirate of Asir	Rebel tribes
1926	1927	Tarimese Civil War	Government of the Sultanate of Tarim: "The League"; Kathiri	Tamimi rebels
1926	1926	1926 Simko Shikak revolt	Pahlavi Iran	Shikak tribesmen Herki tribesmen Begzadeh tribesmen
1926	1927	Nicaraguan civil war (1926-1927)	Nicaraguan Conservatives (government)	Nicaraguan Liberals (rebels)
1926	1928	Northern Expedition Part of the Warlord Era	Republic of China	(Republic of China (1912–1949)) Beiyang Government
1926	1929	Cristero War	Mexico	Cristeros
1926	1926	1926 Communist Revolt in Indonesia	Dutch Empire	Communist Party of Indonesia
1927	1927	1927 Nuer uprising		
1927	1927	February 1927 Revolt	Portugal	February 1927 movement
1927	1930	Ararat rebellion	Turkey	Republic of Ararat
1927	1930	Ikhwan Revolt	Ibn Saud; United Kingdom Kuwait	Ikhwan
1927	1928	Confederalist Rebellion	Soviet Union	Mlado-Yakut Party of Confederalists
1927	1927	1927 Kurdish rebellions	Turkey	Kurdish rebels
1927	1927	Ikhwan raid on Busayya Part of the Ikhwan revolt	Ikhwan	(Iraq) Iraqi Police force
1927	1950	Chinese Civil War	Chinese Communist Party; After 1949: People's Republic of China	Nationalist Party of China; Republic of China; After 1949: Republic of China on Taiwan
1928	1935	Persian conquest of West Baluchistan	Sublime State of Persia	West Baluchistan
1928	1932	Hamed bin Rafda's rebellion	Ibn Saud	Rebels loyal to Hamed bin Rafda
1928	1928	Haji Abdul Rahman Limbong's rebellion	British Empire: North Borneo	Rebels
1928	1929	Afghan Civil War (1928–1929)	Amānullāh Khān (Until 14 January 1929) Inayatullah Khan (14–17 January 1929) Ali Ahmad Khan (17 January – 9 February 1929) Various anti-Saqqawist tribes: Wardak; Maydan; Jalriz; Sanglakh; Mohammed Nādir Khān (March–October 1929) Intervening against Basmachi: Soviet Union	Shinwari tribesmen (14 November–December 1928) Saqqawists (November 1928 – 17 January 1929) Emirate of Afghanistan (18 January – 13 October 1929); In cooperation with: Basmachi (1929)
1928	1931	Kongo-Wara rebellion	France	Gbaya rebels
1929	1931	Kazakh revolts (1929–1931)	Soviet Union	Kazakh Rebels
1929	1929	Escobar Rebellion	Mexico	Escobar rebels
1929	1929	1929 Basmachi border raids on the Soviet Union	Soviet Union	Basmachi
1929	1929	Chiang-Gui War Part of the Warlord Era	(Taiwan) Republic of China	(Taiwan) New Guangxi Clique
1929	1929	Afghan campaign of the Red Army (1929)	Soviet Union	Basmachi
1929	1929	Sino-Soviet conflict (1929)	Soviet Union	Republic of China
1929	1930	Alakat Uprising	Soviet Union	Rebels
1929	1929	1929 Kurdish rebellions	Turkey	Kurdish rebels
1929	1931	Anti-Saqqawist campaigns in Kuhdaman and Herat	Kingdom of Afghanistan	Saqqawists
1929	1930	Women's War	Igbo Women of Owerri and Calabar Provinces	Warrant Chiefs (United Kingdom) British Colonial Forces
1929	1929	Antananarivo uprising	France: Colony of Madagascar and Dependencies	Rebels
1929	1929	Persian tribal uprisings of 1929	Sublime State of Persia	Qashqai, Khamseh, Buyir Ahmadi and Bakhtiari rebels
1929	1929	Nejd Civil War	Kingdom of Hejaz and Nejd	Rebels
1929	1930	Central Plains War Part of the Warlord Era	(Taiwan) Forces of Chiang Kai-shek	(Taiwan) Forces of the coalition of Yan Xishan, Feng Yuxiang, Wang Jingwei, and Li Zongren

== 1930–1944 ==
Start	Finish	Name of Conflict	Belligerents	
Start	Finish	Name of Conflict	Victorious party (if applicable)	Defeated party (if applicable)
1930	1930	Shinwari rebellion	Kingdom of Afghanistan	Shinwari tribesmen
1930	1930	1930 Kurdish rebellions	Turkey	Kurdish rebels
1930	1931	Afridi Redshirt Rebellion	British Empire	Afridi tribesmen
1930	1931	Uprising of the Nghệ-Tĩnh Soviets	(France) French colonial empire	Nghệ-Tĩnh Soviets
1930	1930	Hnov uprising	Soviet Union	Rebels
1930	1930	Gugsa Wale's rebellion	Haile Selassie loyalists	Empress Zewditu supporters
1930	1930	Kuhistan rebellion (February–April 1930)	Kingdom of Afghanistan	Rebels
1930	1930	Yên Bái mutiny	French Indochina	VNQDD
1930	1930	Muromtsevsky uprising	Soviet Union	Rebels
1930	1930	Tugsbuyant uprising	Mongolian People's Republic	Buddhist clergy, former feudal lords, Arats
1930	1932	Saya San Rebellion	British Empire	Burmese rebels
1930	1930	Chittagong armoury raid	British Empire	Anushilan Samiti
1930	1930	Red Army intervention in Afghanistan (1930)	Soviet Union	Basmachi
1930	1930	Kuhistan rebellion (July 1930)	Kingdom of Afghanistan	Saqqawists
1930	1932	Sino-Tibetan War	Republic of China	Tibet
1930	1930	Revolution of 1930	Liberal Alliance and tenentistas.: Brazilian Army	First Brazilian Republic
1930	1930	Khorinskoe uprising	Soviet Union	Rebels
1930	1930	Musha Incident	Empire of Japan; Toda; Truku (Taroko)	Tkdaya
1930	Ongoing	Xinjiang conflict	China	Uyghur separatist movements Including: 1969–1989: East Turkestan People's Revolutionary Party; Supported by: Soviet Union; Mongolia; 1980s–2017: Turkistan Islamic Party; Supported by: Al-Qaeda; Pakistani Taliban; Many other small groups
1931	1931	1931 Saudi–Yemeni border skirmish	Kingdom of Hejaz and Nejd	Mutawakkilite Kingdom of Yemen
1931	1932	Ahmed Barzani revolt	Kingdom of Iraq	Barzan tribe
1931	1931	Flour Revolt	Portugal	Rebels
1931	1931	Madeira uprising	Portugal	Rebels
1931	1931	August 26 Revolt	Portugal	Rebels
1931	1934	Kumul Rebellion	Republic of China	First East Turkestan Republic
1931	1931	Uranian peasant uprising	Soviet Union	Rebels
1931	1931	Chilean naval mutiny of 1931	Chile	Chilean Navy rebels
1931	1931	Jafar Sultan revolt Part of the Kurdish separatism in Iran	Iran	Kurdish rebels
1931	1932	Japanese invasion of Manchuria	Empire of Japan	Republic of China
1931	1931	1931 Cyprus revolt	British Empire	Greek Cypriot rebels
1931	1933	Idrisid Emirate Rebellion	Saudi Arabia	Idrisid Emirate Supported by: Mutawakkilite Kingdom of Yemen
1931	1931	Norte Grande insurrection	Chile	Communist Party of Chile
1931/32	1932	Najran conflict	Saudi Arabia	Yemen
1932	1932	Uukwambi uprising	Union of South Africa	Uukwambi rebels
1932	1932	Annexation of Jimma	Ethiopian Empire	Kingdom of Jimma
1932	1932	Chechen uprising of 1932	Soviet Union	Chechen rebels
1932	1933	Two-Liu War Part of the Warlord Era	(Taiwan) Forces of Liu Xiang (Taiwan) Forces of Tian Songyao (Taiwan) Allied warlords	(Taiwan) Forces of Liu Wenhui (Taiwan) Forces of Wang Jialie (Taiwan) Ma Clique (Taiwan) Allied warlords
1932	1932	Kirghiz rebellion	Republic of China	Kirghiz rebels
1932	1932	La Matanza	El Salvador	Salvadoran peasants
1932	1932	January 28 incident	Republic of China	Empire of Japan
1932	1932	Darre Khel revolt	Kingdom of Afghanistan	Rebels
1932	1939	Soviet–Japanese border conflicts	Soviet Union; Mongolia	Japan: Manchukuo; Japanese Korea
1932	1932	1932 armed uprising in Mongolia	Mongolian People's Republic; Soviet Union	Anti-communist rebels
1932	1932	Lesko uprising	(Poland) Second Polish Republic	Peasant rebels
1932	1932	Constitutionalist Revolution	Brazil	São Paulo
1932	1932	Ecuadorian Civil War of 1932	Leftist and Liberal rebels	Ecuador
1932	1932	Sanjurjada	Spanish Republic	Rebel Officers
1932	1933	Colombia–Peru War	Colombia	Peru
1932	1935	Chaco War	Paraguay	Bolivia
1932	1932	Emu War	Emus	Australia
1933	1933	1933 Mohmand revolt in Afghanistan	Kingdom of Afghanistan	Mohmand rebels
1933	1933	Kazym rebellion	Soviet Union	Khanty rebels
1933	1933	Casas Viejas incident	Spanish Republic	Spanish Anarchists
1933	1933	De Zeven Provinciën Mutiny	The Netherlands	Dutch Navy rebels
1933	1933	Crazy Fakir's rebellion	Kingdom of Afghanistan	Forces of the Crazy Fakir
1933	1936	Actions in Inner Mongolia (1933–1936)	Empire of Japan: Manchukuo; Chinese collaborators; Mongol Military Government (1936)	(Taiwan) Republic of China
1933	1933	Boworadet Rebellion	Thailand	Rebels under Prince Boworadet
1934	1938	Second Cristero War	(Mexico) Mexican Government	Cristeros
1934	1934	Mandalada	Soviet Union	Rebels
1934	1934	1934 Khamba rebellion	Tibet (1912–1951); Sichuan clique Chinese Communist Party	Khamba Tribesmen
1934	1934	Soviet invasion of Xinjiang	Republic of China	Soviet Union (Russian Empire) White Russian forces Torgut Mongols
1934	1934	Saudi–Yemeni War (1934) Part of the Unification of Saudi Arabia	Saudi Arabia	Yemen
1934	1934	Austrian Civil War	(Austria) First Austrian Republic Fatherland's Front	Social Democratic Party of Austria
1934	1934	July Putsch	Federal State of Austria	Austrian Nazis
1934	1934	Events of 6 October	(Second Spanish Republic) Spanish Republic	Generalitat of Catalonia
1934	1934	Asturian miners' strike of 1934	Spanish Republic	Asturian Miners
1934	1934	Inamujandi Revolt	Belgium	Burundian Rebels
1935	1935	Narrenrevolte	Nazi Germany	Rebels
1935	1935	Mohmand campaign of 1935	British Empire	Mohmand tribesmen
1935	1936	1935–1936 Iraqi Shia revolts	Kingdom of Iraq	Shia tribesmen
1935	1935	1935 Greek coup d'état attempt	Second Hellenic Republic	Venizelist rebels
1935	1935	May 2 uprising	United States	Sakdalista
1935	1935	Goharshad Mosque rebellion	Iran	Bazaaris
1935	1935	1935 Yazidi revolt	Kingdom of Iraq	Yazidis
1935	1937	Second Italo-Ethiopian War	Kingdom of Italy	Ethiopian Empire
1935	1935	Brazilian communist uprising of 1935	Brazil	Brazilian Communist Party
1936	1936	Scythe Cross rebellion	Kingdom of Hungary	Hungarian National Socialist Party
1936	1936	February 26 incident	Empire of Japan	Righteous Army
1936	1939	1936–1939 Arab revolt in Palestine Part of the Intercommunal conflict in Mandatory Palestine	United Kingdom; British Army; Palestine Police Force; Jewish Settlement Police; Jewish Supernumerary Police; Haganah; Special Night Squads; FOSH; Peulot Meyuhadot; Irgun; Peace Bands	Arab Higher Committee
1936	1939	Spanish Civil War	National faction: Falange; Carlists (1936–1937); CEDA (1936–1937); Alfonsists (1936–1937); Army of Africa; Supported by: Italy; Germany; Portugal; Foreign volunteers	(Second Spanish Republic) Republican faction: (Second Spanish Republic) Spanish Republican Army; Popular Front; CNT/FAI; UGT; ERC; (Basque Country (autonomous community)) Basque Army (1936–1937); Galicianist Party; Supported by: International Brigades; Soviet Union (1936–1938); Mexico; France (1936)
1936	1936	1936 Naval Revolt	Portugal	Revolutionary Armed Organization
1936	1936	1936 Iraqi coup d'état	(Iraq) Bakr Sidqi's supporters	(Iraq) Iraqi Government
1936	1939	Waziristan campaign (1936–1939)	British Empire: India	Waziristan
1937	1939	Katawz rebellion	Kingdom of Afghanistan	Rebels
1937	1937	Afghan tribal revolts of 1937	Kingdom of Afghanistan	Rebel tribes: Mohmand; Shinwari; Sulaimankhel
1937	1937	Dieu Python movement	French Indochina	Degar rebels
1937	1938	Dersim rebellion	Turkey	Dersim tribes
1937	1937	Islamic rebellion in Xinjiang (1937)	Soviet Union (Russian Empire) White Russian forces	Republic of China
1937	1945	Second Sino-Japanese War; Part of World War II	Republic of China Soviet Union (1937–1941; 1944–1945); United States (1941–1945); British Empire (1942–1945)	Empire of Japan Reorganized National Government of China; Manchukuo; Mengjiang
1938	1938	Integralist Uprising	Brazil	Brazilian Integralist Action
1938	1939	Afghan tribal revolts of 1938	Kingdom of Afghanistan	Rebel tribes: Shinwari; Suleimankhel; Ghilzai; Alizai
1938	1938	1938 Greek coup d'état attempt	Second Hellenic Republic	Venizelist rebels
1938	1938	Sudeten German uprising	Sudetendeutsches Freikorps Germany	Czechoslovakia
1939	1939	Hungarian invasion of Carpatho-Ukraine	Kingdom of Hungary	Carpatho-Ukraine
1939	1939	Slovak–Hungarian War	Kingdom of Hungary	Slovak Republic
1939	1965	Maquis insurgency	Nationalist Spain	(Second Spanish Republic) Spanish Maquis
1939	1939	Italian invasion of Albania	Kingdom of Italy	(Albania) Albanian Kingdom
1939	1945	World War II	Allied Powers: Soviet Union; United States; United Kingdom; China; Free France; Poland; Yugoslavia; Greece; Netherlands; Belgium; Luxembourg; Norway; Czechoslovakia; Canada; Australia; New Zealand; South Africa; Philippines (Ethiopian Empire) Ethiopia; Brazil (Mongolian People's Republic) Mongolia; Mexico and others...	Axis Powers: Germany; Japan; Italy; Hungary Romania; Bulgaria; Finland; Thailand and others...
1939	1939	1939 Ondonga uprising	South Africa	Odonga rebels
1939	1940	Winter War; Part of World War II	Soviet Union	Finland
1940	1944	1940–1944 insurgency in Chechnya Part of World War II and the Chechen–Russian conflict	Soviet Union	Provisional Popular Revolutionary Government of Chechnya-Ingushetia Supported by: (Nazi Germany) Germany (1942)
1940	1940	Czortków uprising Part of World War II	Soviet Union	(Poland) Polish rebels
1940	1940	Soviet occupation of the Baltic states (1940); Part of World War II	Soviet Union	Estonia Latvia Lithuania
1940	1940	Soviet occupation of Bessarabia and Northern Bukovina; Part of World War II	Soviet Union	Romania
1940	1941	Franco-Thai War; Part of World War II	Thailand	Vichy France French Indochina
1941	1941	Legionnaires' Rebellion Part of World War II	Kingdom of Romania	Iron Guard
1941	1941	Anglo-Iraqi War; Part of World War II	United Kingdom British India (Jordan) Transjordan	Kingdom of Iraq Nazi Germany; Kingdom of Italy
1941	1941	June 1941 uprising in eastern Herzegovina; Part of World War II	Independent State of Croatia Italy	Serb rebels from eastern Herzegovina and Montenegro
1941	1944	Continuation War; Part of World War II	Soviet Union United Kingdom	Finland Nazi Germany; Kingdom of Italy
1941	1941	Ecuadorian–Peruvian War	Peru	Ecuador
1941	1941	Uprising in Serbia (1941); Part of World War II	Government of National Salvation Nazi Germany	Partisans Chetniks
1941	1944	Hama Rashid revolt Part of the Kurdish separatism in Iran and World War II	Iran	Kurdish tribes
1942	1954	Hukbalahap Rebellion (During WWII)	Philippines; United States	Hukbalahap; Soviet Union; Japan
1943	1943	1943 Khuzestan revolt	Iran	Khuzistan rebels
1943	1945	1943 Barzani revolt Part of the Iraqi–Kurdish conflict	Kingdom of Iraq Supported by: Kurdish tribesmen (1945): Zibrari; Berwari; Doski; Elements of the ‘Muhajarin' tribe	Kurdish rebels: Barzani tribesmen; Allied Kurdish tribes
1943	1943	Woyane rebellion	Ethiopian Empire UK	Woyanne rebels
1943	1945	Italian Civil War; Part of World War II	Italian Resistance; Kingdom of Italy (United Kingdom) (United States) Allied Powers	Italian Social Republic Nazi Germany
1943	1944	Jesselton revolt Part of World War II	Empire of Japan	Kinabalu rebels
1943	1949	Ukrainian Insurgent Army insurgency	Soviet Union; People's Republic of Poland Polish Underground State Nazi Germany (1941–1944)	Ukrainian Insurgent Army
1944	1945	1944–1945 Insurgency in Balochistan	United Kingdom: British India	Badinzai rebels
1944	1946	Anti-communist resistance in Poland (1944–1953)	People's Republic of Poland Soviet Union	(Polish Underground State) Cursed soldiers
1944	1947	Afghan tribal revolts of 1944–1947	Afghanistan • Allied Nuristani and Shinwari tribesmen British Empire • India	Rebel tribes: Zadran (1944–1947); Safi (until 1946); Mangal (1945)
1944	1948	Jewish insurgency in Mandatory Palestine	Jewish Resistance Movement: Haganah; Irgun; Lehi	(United Kingdom) British Army; Royal Navy; Royal Air Force (United Kingdom) Palestine Police Force
1944	1944	Luluabourg and Jadotville Mutiny	Belgian Congo	Force Publique Mutineers
1944	1944	Kitawalist uprising	Belgian Congo	Watchtower Movement
1944	1944	Palm Sunday Coup Part of World War II	El Salvador	Pro-Axis rebels
1944	1945	Lapland War; Part of World War II	Finland	Nazi Germany
1944	1949	Ili Rebellion	Chinese Communist Party; Second East Turkestan Republic; Soviet Union (Russia) White Russian forces Mongolian People's Republic	Republic of China; National Revolutionary Army
1944	1960	Goryani Insurgency	People's Republic of Bulgaria	Goryani
1944	1956	Guerrilla war in the Baltic states	Soviet Union	(Estonia) (Latvia) (Lithuania) Forest Brothers
