= Second Battle of Talal =

1873 battle

- Part of List of wars involving Saudi Arabia
Date	1873
Location	Mount Talal in Aley Najd (administratively located in Al-Hanakiyah Governorate near Talal Hijrat)
Result	Otaiba tribe victory; Injury of Saud bin Faisal Al Saud (the injury was a major cause of his death and, in turn, contributed to the end of the Second Saudi State)

Belligerents
Otaiba tribe	Emirate of Najd: Ajman tribe; Mutair tribe; Subay' tribe; Suhool tribe; Dawasir tribe

Commanders and leaders
Muslit bin Rubayan	Saud bin Faisal Al Saud

Strength
800	8,000 fighters (according to Sheliwih Al-Atawi’s poem and some sources) 3000 fighters (according to another source)

Casualties and losses
light losses	heavy losses
- This battle is one of the reasons for the weakness of the second Saudi state and its subsequent fall at the hands of Ibn Rashid. Famous riders from the Otaiba tribe participated

The Second Battle of Talal took place in the year 1873 between the army of Imam Saud bin Faisal bin Turki Al Saud and members of the Otaiba tribe.

== Background ==
After the Battle of Al-Bura in the year 1871, a delegation of tribal chiefs congratulated Imam Saud bin Faisal Al Saud on his victory over his brother Imam Abdullah. And when the affairs of Imam Saud's army improved, he went to fight Muslit bin Rubayan because of the raids he made on Riyadh in favor of Imam Abdullah.

=== Participating tribes ===
Some tribes joined the side of Imam Saud to fight Muslit bin Rubayan, and among those tribes: the Ajman tribe, the Mutair tribe, the Subay' tribe, the Suhool tribe, and the Dawasir tribe.

== Battle ==
The news reached Sheikh Muslit before the arrival of the army of Imam Saud, and Muslit bin Rubayan and those with him were present in Harrat Kashab at Jabal Talal.

Muslit bin Rubayan removed the women and money from the battle site and prepared those with him to fight, their number was 800 men, and the army of Imam Saud numbered 3,000 fighters. The two teams fought from morning until noon, then Imam Saud was defeated, Muslit's army seized his camp and his horses, and Imam Saud and those who stayed with him fled to Riyadh when he was wounded. This battle was decisive in the history of Imam Saud, for which there was no list after that.

== Losses ==
The battle caused the death of Saud bin Sunitan Al Saud, Muhammad Ahmad Al-Sudairy, the governor of the city of Ghat, and Ali bin Ibrahim bin Suwaid, the governor of the city of Jalajel. It also caused the death of Fahd bin Sadhan, Saleh bin Ibrahim bin Musa bin Fawzan bin Issa, Suleiman bin Abdullah bin Khalaf bin Issa, Saad bin Muhammad bin Abdul Karim. Al Bawardi, who are residents of the city of Shaqra He died from the army of Imam Saud because of being lost in the desert, and they died of thirst
