= Jwamer Aga =

Leader of the Hamawand tribe

Jwamer Agha Khan
- Khan, Agha, Sarhang (Colonel), Brigadier General, Ruler of Zuhab, Qasr-e Shirin and Osmaniye Appointed Agha by birth and appointed Khan by Zil al Sultan

Hama Reshid Qaidar Haidar Beg Jawamer Agha, Hama Khan, Hama Sherif
- Born: 1815, Shirin Palace, Ali Mansouri, Hamawand Territory, Iran
- Died: 1887–1888, Qasr-e Shirin, Iran (72–73 years old)
- Spouse: Unknown
- Issue: Hama Khan, Hama Sherif, Hama Rasoul Beg, Prince Faqe Qadir Hamawand Mirza (Grandson)
- Royal house: (Paternal) Princely House of Begzada Chalabi
- Father: Both from the Chalabi, unknown, under speculation, either Ali Agha, son of Yadgar Begzada, or Ahmad Beg Chalavi, son of Defterdar Baynizada Prince Mohammed Chalavi Hamawand
- Mother: Unknown
- Religion: Sunni Islam

Jwāmer Aga (Javānmardi) (Sorani Kurdish: جوامێر ئاغای هه‌مه‌وه‌ند), (Gorani Kurdish: جوامر ئاگهە هەماواند), was the head of the Kurdish tribe of Hamawand during the late-nineteenth-century Ottoman era and was a Kurdish noble and aristocrat born into a prominent, princely family with numerous titles.

Jwamer was appointed the ruler of Zuhab with 1,000 tomans as allowance for the Qasr-e Shirin district and Osmaniye after the overthrow of its hereditary ruling family the Bajalan. Jwamer which means one who is descended from nobility or is noble. He was born in 1815 in the familial Shirin Palace, which was located in the village of Ali Mansouri, a territory of Hamawand. He was executed in Qasr-e-Shirin in 1887–1888.

== His cause of death ==
Jwamer received the title Khan from Massoud Mirza Zell-e Soltan, the son of Naser al-Din Shah Qajar and the Viceroy of Southern Iran from 1881 to 1888, In addition, he became Sarhang and the Guardian of the Frontier for the most critical routes. He was remunerated with 6,000 Nassirian coins as well as 3,000 tomans 'to coerce him into good behaviour' for his role as the Guardian of the Frontier in 1886.

Shortly after, most of the Ḥamāvand returned to the Bāzyān district, where they were subdued by Ottoman forces. In 1889, the Ottoman government exiled half of the tribe to Cyrenaica in North Africa and the other half to the vilayet of Adana. Those exiled to Cyrenaica fought their way back to their homeland in 1896, and a few months later, the group sent to Adana also returned to the Bāzyān district.

=== Reactions ===
However, he was subsequently criticised by the British lieutenant Maunsell, who deemed the appointment of Massoud Mirza Zell-e Sultan to Jwamer Agha an absurdity, citing the theory of surrounding a thief to draw back a thief. Nevertheless, he proved to be an effective and timely source of security. He was commended for his 'appropriate' behaviour after being reprimanded. He progressed from the rank of Colonel to that of Brigadier General.He constructed a castle in Qasr-e Shirin, where he resided with his sons Hama Khan, Hama Sherif and Hama Reshid Beg. He also undertook the reconstruction of the city and the establishment of new markets. His palace was destroyed and his land was left behind when he was executed.

=== Peers ===
Prince Faqe Qadri Hamawand Mirza, father of Mirza Muhammad Amin Agha Hamawand, the ruler of Chamchamal and Baziani, was also a member of the nobility of Hamawand. It is evident that he had familial connections; he departed the country during a period of exile and left his estate behind. The value of his land was approximately 58,450 piastres. The government proceeded to sell the aforementioned land. Faqe was exiled to Libya in Benghazi, where he probably died in 1890. Jwamer Aga and his peers were exiled and beheaded by the Jaffs after the Ottomans and Qajars opposed him six years later. This occurred following his appointment as ruler of Zuhab and the Qasr-e Shirin district by the Shah of Iran in 1881. Prior to this, the Jaffs and Hamawands had been engaged in a long-standing conflict. Jwamer held the Persian forces at Qasr-e Shirin for two months.

Jwamer Agha's family were distinguished landowners who amassed significant wealth through strategic appointments. For instance, when Omer Pasha elevated an obscure member of his cadre, Rifaat, to the governorship of Rawandiz, he concomitantly dismissed Ismail from the governorship of Shahrizor and reinstated the influential Muhammad Khosrow as chieftain of the Jafs, thereby forestalling the dissolution of its confederation. In addition to this, Pasha exercised his authority to oversee the Hamawand districts, which had been contributing no revenues to the government in return for a prestigious tax payment of 50,000 purses (31 million per year). The Pasha was also responsible for maintaining safe roads and ensuring general tranquillity. Towards the end of 1869, Omer Pasha arrived in Suleimaniya in person, accompanied by a significant military force, despite having postponed his departure for his new assignment in Istanbul. In addition to the Hamawand district in Suleimaniya, southern Kurdistan experienced a period of uninterrupted tranquillity. However, the approach adopted by Omer Pasha towards the Kurdish tribal chiefs had enduring consequences.

=== Government Actions ===
Following the fall of Ẓell-al-Solṭān, the Ḥamāvand once again resumed their raids, which ultimately led the Iranian government including the Ottomans to take decisive action, as they were opposed against him and had confessed plans for his murder. A few months later, Jwāmer Āqā was invited to meet with an emissary from Tehran. During this meeting, he and his peers were killed.

=== The Curzons ===
George Nathaniel Curzon, notes that Jwamer was invited to a meeting with Tehran's emissary, where he was slain. He was reprimanded during the meeting for his 'rebellious' behaviour.

== Marriages ==
Nasreddin Shah, the Shah of the Qajar dynasty, arranged a matrimonial alliance by giving two of his daughters in marriage to the eldest son of Jwamer Aga which was Hama Beg. This union was intended to strengthen ties between the Qajar dynasty and the influential Hamawand tribe. However, after a decade, the daughters returned to their paternal home. In response, Nasreddin Shah personally crossed into the Hamawand territory, signaling a potential shift in the political dynamics between the Qajar dynasty and the Hamawand tribe.

== Threats ==
While the Ottomans offered their support to the Jafs and pursued the Hamawands, on the Iranian side, the governor of Kermanshah, Nasr al-Mulk, having received news of the unrest, took steps to prepare an army with the intention of confronting Jwamer Agha and capturing him. This was due to the fact that the Hamawands were previously fugitives and were believed to be responsible for the murder of Malik Niaz Khan. It is said that, upon realising that he was unable to face the Iranian army, Jwamer Agha was left with no alternative but to offer an apology and request refuge. Nasr al-Mulk, in return, is said to have agreed to provide him with asylum and allow him to stay in Kermanshah, on the understanding that he would go to Prince Zilal-Sultan in Isfahan. It seems that, if the prince did not object to Jwamer's stay in Kermanshah, he would be permitted to do so. Meanwhile,

According to a report sent to Istanbul by an Ottoman agent in the Iranian army, Nasr al-Mulk, because the Ottomans had sheltered Sheikh Ubaidullah and had not handed him over to Iran, it seems that he guaranteed the Hamawands they would not be surrendered to the Ottomans.

Hisam ul-Mulk made false promises regarding a treaty induced Jwamer Agha to come into his camp near Qasr-e Shirin. However he had stabbed him in the tent behind his back. After the tribe's actions to Jwamer, they fled to Qaradagh.

== Ottoman Empire ==
This period had a profound impact on the Hamawand nobility. The late 19th century was a period of significant challenges for both the tribe and the broader Kurdish population under the Ottoman Empire. The Hamawand tribe, like many Kurdish groups in the empire, faced internal strife, external pressures, and an increasingly difficult relationship with the Ottoman authorities.

In 1889, in response to rising tensions with the Kurdish tribes, the Ottoman authorities exiled several Hamawand tribesmen to Tripolitania (modern-day Libya). This move was part of a broader Ottoman strategy to assert control over rebellious Kurdish factions. However, many of the exiled Hamawand tribesmen managed to escape their captors and make their way back to the Mosul region, where they resumed their activities. This event reflected the difficulty the Ottoman Empire faced in controlling its Kurdish population, particularly in the empire's remote eastern and southern provinces

=== Escalating Tensions ===
By March 1891, the situation between the Hamawand tribe and the Ottoman government had further escalated. In an effort to resolve the conflict, 90 notable residents of Kirkuk—an important city in the northern part of Ottoman Iraq—sent a 'embarrassing' petition as well as a letter to the Ottoman Palace via the French Embassy. The petition urged the Ottoman authorities to address the mounting tensions and offered a public expression of the challenges faced by the empire in managing its Kurdish subjects. This petition was a significant political move, as it highlighted the difficulty of the Ottoman Empire in maintaining control over the Kurdish tribes and was emblematic of the growing Kurdish dissatisfaction with Ottoman rule.

=== Responses ===
In response to the Kurdish uprisings and the desire to maintain control over its peripheral regions, the Ottoman Empire established the Hamidiye Light Cavalry Regiments (Hamidiye Hafif Suvari Alayları) in 1891. These regiments were composed of Kurdish tribes, including the Hamawand, and were created to function as a countermeasure against Russian expansion and to bolster the empire's military presence in the eastern regions The formation of the Hamidiye regiments represented an attempt to co-opt Kurdish tribal forces in the service of the Ottoman state, allowing the Kurdish leaders more autonomy while still serving imperial interests. While the Hamidiye regiments were initially designed to provide a military buffer against Russia and maintain internal order, they also played a significant role in reinforcing the traditional tribal structures that existed within Kurdish society.

=== Aftermath ===
This period marked a critical juncture in the history of the Hamawand tribe and broader Kurdish-Ottoman relations. The tribe's participation in the Hamidiye regiments reflected the complex relationship between the Kurdish tribes and the Ottoman Empire, which involved both cooperation and resistance.While the Ottoman Empire sought to integrate the Kurdish tribes into its military system, the tensions that led to the exile and petition demonstrate the persistent challenges the empire faced in managing Kurdish autonomy and unrest.These struggles foreshadowed later tensions between the Kurdish population and the Ottoman Empire, which would continue to intensify throughout he early 20th century.

== Legacy ==
Former KDP Secretary General Ibrahim Ahmad named the main character in his famed nationalistic novel Jani Gal in reference to Jwamer. A village was also named in his honour in the northernmost part of the Kifri district in the Diyala Province. Jwamer is considered an early Kurdish nationalist figure by the citizens of the Kurdistan Region. In 1958, his family was considered by the French to belong to the noblesse, the nobility of a foreign country.
