= Saudi–Yemeni war =

Saudi–Yemeni war may refer to:

- 1931 Saudi–Yemeni border skirmish
- Saudi–Yemeni war (1934)
- Saudi-led intervention in the Yemeni civil war
  - Houthi–Saudi conflict
