= Saeed Al-Faihani =

Bahraini diplomat and politician

- سعيد الفيحاني
- Born: Saeed Muhammad Al-Faihani; March 23, 1960 (age 66); Muharraq, Bahrain
- Education: Ohio University (M.A.)
- Occupations: diplomat, politician
- Years active: 1983—Present

Saeed Muhammad Al-Faihani (Arabic: سعيد محمد الفيحاني, born March 23, 1960, in Muharraq) is a Bahraini diplomat and politician.

== Early life and education ==
Al-Faihani was born on March 23, 1960, in Muharraq, Bahrain. He belongs to the Subay' tribe.

Earning his high school diploma in 1976, Al-Faihani graduated with a Bachelor of Arts in Political Science from Concordia University in Canada in 1981. He then obtained a Master of Arts in Political Science from Ohio University in the United States of America in 1983.

== Career ==
Al-Faihani started working at the Ministry of Foreign Affairs in 1983 as an Under-Secretary, continuing at the post from 1985 to 1988 with the added title of Deputy Consul at the Consulate General in Geneva, Switzerland. He was promoted to Chief Secretary of the Bahrain Mission to the United Nations (UN) in New York City from 1988 to 1994, adding the title of Consul there from 1993 to his exit. From 1995 to 1998, he served as Chief of Staff to Foreign Minister Muhammad ibn Mubarak ibn Hamad Al Khalifah, retitled advisor to the Minister’s Office in 1999.

Upon the accession of King Hamad bin Isa Al Khalifa in 2002, Al-Faihani was appointed Consul-General to Switzerland and Permanent Representative to the UN office there, adding to his duties from 2001 to 2005 as Permanent Delegate to the World Trade Organization. In 2011, he was appointed as Under-Secretary for Human Rights at the Ministry of Human Rights and Social Developments, followed by an election as chair of the fifteenth session of the Working Group on Communications of the United Nations Human Rights Council (UNHRC) in 2014 and as Vice-Chair of the fourteenth session of the UNHRC Advisory Committee in 2015. In 2017, a royal decree removed him from the presidency of the National Institution for Human Rights and from his Ambassadorship, described by the Gulf Institute for Democracy and Human Rights as an admission of his failure to manage public relations for the government’s human rights record.

=== Bahraini uprising of 2011 ===
On the subject of trials of the twenty doctors, nurses, and paramedics who occupied the Salmaniya Medical Complex during the Bahraini uprising of 2011, Al-Faihani declared to the Kuwait News Agency that “the trials were clear, fair, and open and were attended by representatives of non-government organizations from outside Bahrain.”
