= Utmanzai (Wazir clan) =

A clan of the Pashtun Wazir tribe found in Waziristan, Pakistan.

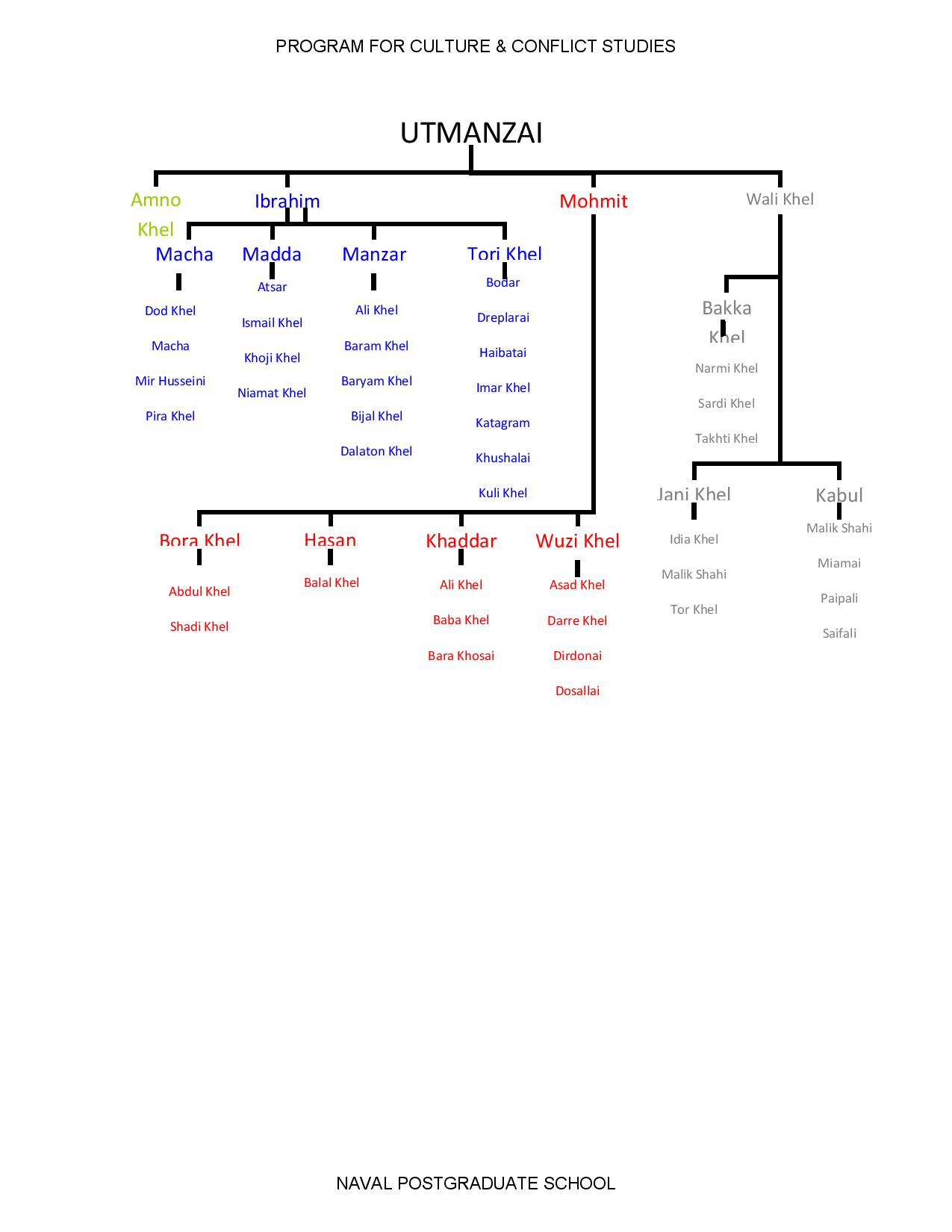
Subtribes of the Utmanzai Pashtuns

The Utmanzai (Pashto: اتمانزی) or Utmanzai Wazir (Pashto:عثمانزي وزیر) (trans. "descendants of Utman", and also spelled Uthmanzai, Othmanzai) are a Sunni Muslim Pashtun tribe found in North Waziristan Agency, and Bannu Subdivision Wazir.

== Background ==
Their territory lies on the border with Afghanistan and historically they migrated between the hills during the summer and the valleys in the winter. Although primarily a pastoral tribe, they and the related Mahsud wazir tribe — with whom they have a historical antipathy — were described by Arnold Fletcher in 1965 as "perhaps the most powerful and aggressive of the border Pushtoons".

The Utmanzai form one of the Three major branches of the Wazir tribe, with the other being the Ahmadzai and Mahsud Wazir of South Waziristan Agency. The Utmanzai branch is further subdivided, for example into tribes such as the Bakka Khel and Jani Khel. The common ancestor of the Ahmadzai and Utmanzai is the eponymous Wazir, who is also ancestor to the Mehsuds who have since taken a distinct and divergent path. Through Wazir, the tribes trace their origins to Karlanri and thence to the founder of the Pashtun lineage, Qais Abdur Rashid. The North and South Waziristan agencies together form the region of Waziristan, which derives its name from this supra-tribe.

In December 2012, the government of North Waziristan Agency used its powers under the Frontier Crimes Regulations to remove privileges from the Utmanzai, such as honorariums given to tribal elders. The government also ordered that the issue of official documentation, such as national identity cards and passports, to members of the tribe should cease. These measures were taken in an attempt to force members of the tribe to provide security for teams who were running a polio vaccination campaign in the area. The Shura Mujahideen, led by Hafiz Gul Bahadur — a member of the tribe and a militant leader associated with Tehrik-i-Taliban Pakistan — had issued an order in June 2012 that the campaign should be opposed until drone attacks by the United States ended. Tribal members also believed that the US took advantage of vaccination campaigns for intelligence purposes and that it was a fake vaccination campaign in Abbottabad that had led to the tracing of the Al-Qaeda leader, Osama bin Laden. The restrictions were lifted temporarily in February 2013 to allow voter registration to be completed.

== Notable people ==
Fazal Rahim Dawar

Muhib Wazir

== See also ==
- Kabul Khel, an Utmanzai subtribe
