= Kolašin Affair (1909) =

The Kolašin Affair (Serbian: Колашинска афера) was a rebellion in the Montenegrin military against the dictatorship of the Prince of Montenegro, Nikola I Petrović-Njegoš, that broke out in 1909. It followed the failed Bombaš Affair (Бомбашка афера), a conspiracy organized in 1907 by a group of Montenegrin students connected to the Black Hand to break the Montenegrin government through terrorist attacks (with bombs, hence "Bombaši"), and ultimately unite Montenegro with Serbia, that was detected and led to numerous arrests in 1908. In the same year, a secret organization of Montenegrin politicians and political emigrees in Belgrade in opposition to Nikola I was formed. The organization's statute said that Nikola I was to be killed. The organization planned to free the Bombaši and change Tomanović's reactionary regime. The organization had important subsidiaries in Vasojevići, Kuči and Bratonožići, and allegedly had 1,000 members. It was detected by the Montenegrin police and led to the imprisonment and death sentences of the conspirators. The two affairs led to deteriorating bilateral relations between Montenegro and Serbia.

Ljubomir Vuksanović was one of the participants in this affair. He was sentenced to 15 years in prison, but he managed to escape from the prison.

== See also ==
- Kolašin Affair (1858)
- Kolašin Affair (1901)

== Sources ==
- Adrija Koprivica (1966). Takvi su bili. Obod.
- Историјски часопис 3 (1951-1952). Istorijski institut. 1 September 1953. pp. 469–. GGKEY:73HS377YS6Y.
- Jovan Donović (1939). Ustavne i politicke borbe u Crnoj Gori 1905-1910. - Beograd: K. J. Mihailovic 1939. 331 S. 8° [Serb.]. Kosta S. Mihailović.
- Nešković, Borivoje (1953). Istina o solunskom procesu. Narodna knjiga.
