= Bitlis uprising =

Bitlis uprising may refer to:

- Bitlis uprising (1907), Kurdish uprising against the Ottoman Empire
- Bitlis uprising (1914), Kurdish uprising against the Ottoman Empire

== See also ==
- Battle of Bitlis
