= Najran conflict =

1930s conflict between the Kingdom of Yemen and the Kingdom of Hejaz and Nejd

Date	1931/1932
Location	Najran
Result	Inconclusive

Belligerents
Kingdom of Yemen	Kingdom of Hejaz and Nejd

Commanders and leaders
(Kingdom of Yemen) Unknown	Khalid bin Luwai

The Najran conflict was a poorly documented conflict over Najran in the early 1930s fought between the Mutawakkilite Kingdom of Yemen and the Kingdom of Hejaz and Nejd. In the winter of 1931/1932, in response to a Yemeni unit invading Najran and destroying Saudi property, Khalid bin Luwai arrived in Najran with his forces and clashed with Yemeni troops. As a result of the clash, the Yemeni troops were forced to withdraw from Najran.

== Historical accounts ==
All known details are provided on page 322 of St John Philby's 1955 book Saudi Arabia, which gives the following account:

But in the winter of 1931/2 a more serious incident occurred, when a Yamani force descended on and occupied Najran, where the property of unfriendly elements was destroyed. Their complaints forced Ibn Sa'ud to react vigorously; and during the spring of 1932 the Khurma chief, Khalid ibn Luwai, led a strong Ikhwan force to the scene, and had little difficulty in chasing the Yamani garrison out of the oasis and occupying it in the name of Ibn Sa'ud. The Najran issue was thus settled for good.

— St John Philby, Saudi Arabia

The conflict is also mentioned on page 54 of Nadav Safran's 1988 book Saudi Arabia: The Ceaseless Quest for Security, which gives a similar account, likely based on that of Philby:

The immediate cause of the Yemen war was a dispute over the oasis of Najran, on the border between the two countries, which the forces of Imam Yahya seized and from which the Ikhwan ousted them in the spring of 1932.

— Nadav Safran, Saudi Arabia: The Ceaseless Quest for Security

== Commentary ==
In an enquiry in 2017, the Correlates of War project was unable to find any further information, and found that The Times did not contain any mention of such incident. They went on to add the following statement:

It's clear something happened here. However, we will never be able to verify the details of this MID independent of Philby. Philby is reputable as a source for the politics of Saudi Arabia at this time. He was also a close associate of Ibn Saud. That said, he offers no details of this dispute on which to build. We do not know the months in which it happened. Technically, we do not even know the year. We're not given great information about how to separate an attack from a clash or a show of force from an occupation of territory at the incident-level. We may never know the full details of this incident. It may be lost to history.

== See also ==
- 1931 Saudi–Yemeni border skirmish, a preceding Saudi–Yemeni conflict
- Saudi–Yemeni War (1934), a subsequent Saudi–Yemeni conflict
- List of wars involving Saudi Arabia
