= Hamawand (tribe) =

Kurdish tribe in Iraq and Iran

The Hamawand (Kurdish: ھەمەوەند, Hemewend) are a Kurdish tribe living mainly in Iraq but also in Iran. They speak Kurdish and mainly follow Sunni Islam.

== History ==
D. N. MacKenzie claimed that the name of the Hamawand tribe was historically Arabized as Ahmadwand, despite Hama generally being the hypocoristic for Mohammad in Kurdish. He described the Hamawand as a Kurdish tribe of around 10,000 people, originally from the Kermanshah region but migrated to the region around Chamchamal and Bazyan near Sulaymaniyah around 1770, where they settled in around fifty villages, while an offshoot of the tribe went to Shiraz. The chief family was divided into the sections known as Ramawand, Safarwand, Rashawand and Begzada. Pierre Oberling claimed that the name of the Hamawand tribe came from Mohammadwand. He described them as a Kurdish tribe from Kermanshah which moved to Bazyan in the 18th century and later became known as "the most celebrated fighting tribe of southern Kurdistan." The Hamawand were said to have originated from Qasr-e Shirin.

The Hamawand were also historically noted for being "the most valiant, courageous, and intelligent of the Baban Kurds." The Hamawand supported the Principality of Baban until their autonomy came to an end in 1850. In the following decades, the Hamawand tribe harassed the Ottoman and Persian authorities equally, and systematically brigaded the whole region between Baghdad, Mosul, and Kermanshah. In 1878, the tribe invaded the Caucasus with 600 horsemen and returned with immense goods. Their robberies intensified after the Ottoman-Russian War of 1877–1878, and again after 1885, after which Kâmil Pasha tasked the Vali of Mosul with suppressing the tribe. Although Ömer Vehbi Paşa suppressed the tribe in 1894, they resumed the robberies shortly after. One of the most feared leaders of the Hamawand tribe was Jwamer Aga, who was made governor of Qasr-e Shirin and Zohab in 1881 by the Shah of Iran but killed six later in an Ottoman and Qajar plot. However, he became a folk hero among his tribe for putting the Ottomans in great distress. In 1889, the Hamawand were weakened by the Persian government and then retired near Bazyan, after which the Ottoman authorities deported half of them to Adana in Turkey and half to Tripoli in Libya. Seven years later, the Hamawand in Tripoli, including men, women, and children, fought their way back to Bazyan and the Ottomans allowed the whole tribe to reunite. While the Hamawand tribe were exiled in the 1890s to several locations, those exiled to Rhodes were allowed to return to Mosul in 1905, while those in Adana and Tripolitania made their way back to Bazyan in 1907, with the tribe reuniting and resuming its brigandage, again coming into conflict with the Ottomans. In 1908, after the Young Turk Revolution, the Hamawand tribe rebelled against the Ottomans in a rebellion led by Sheikh Said Barzinji who died in 1909. At that time, the attacks by the Hamawand tribe became unbearable, and the roads from Baghdad to Kirkuk, Baghdad to Sulaymaniyah, and Kirkuk to Sulaymaniyah were fully closed, stopping trade and transportation for around two years and only opened after the Hamawand were suppressed with considerable force. While the rebellion was suppressed by Nadim Pasha, the Hamawand remained in a state of rebellion until World War I. While the Hamawand used rifles, they also used swords and lances as late as the 1880s. Boys from the Hamawand tribe traditionally began training upon reaching the age of seven.

In the Sâlnâme of Mosul vilayet dated 1894/1895 (1312 A.H.), the Hamawand tribe were mentioned as an "embarrassing community" due to their behavior, and divided into the clans of Beyzada, Safarwand, Rashawand, Ramawand, Khilasori, Timawand, and Hamail Fatmawand. Ely Bannister Soane divided the Hamawand into the pure Hamawand, comprising the clans of Begzada/Chalabi, Rashawand, Ramawand, Safarwand, and Setabasar, as well as the peasants attached to the tribe, comprising the clans of Kaferushi, Piriai, Sufiawand, and Chegini. He described the Hamawand as Shafi'i and speaking Kurmanji, adding that they were the fiercest Kurdish tribe. He added that the tribe lived to the east of the city of Kirkuk. The Hamawand tribe historically moved between the city of Mosul and the Ottoman-Iranian border. They also lived on the western fringe of Iran. Around the time of World War I, many outsiders knew the Hamawand tribe as the "Wolves of Kurdistan" due to their habits.

In May 1918, when British forces occupied Kirkuk and Sulaymaniyah, the Hamawand tribe supported Sheikh Mahmud to set up an independent Kurdish state under British protection. The tribe continued to support Sheikh Mahmud after he began opposing the British. Later, the Hamawand tribe fought the Iraqi government as well. The Hamawand tribe simultaneously fought against the government of Saddam Hussein in the north and the militant group Ansar al-Islam in the east, receiving the attention of The New York Times, which published a front-page article about the Hamawand tribe on January 15, 2003. The Hamawand tribe also fought against the Islamic State, and received attention from Vice News in 2016 for having "fought everyone from the Ottomans to ISIS". The Hamawand tribe received significant praise from Kurdish nationalists due to their historic loyalty to Kurdish administrators and conflicts with their enemies.
