= Turkoman Revolt of 1915 =

The Turkoman Revolt of 1915 was a revolt by Yomud Turkomans against the Khanate of Khiva, which was at the time was ruled by Isfandiyar Khan. It was not supported by any of the Central Powers. Its causes laid in the arrest of a Yomut chieftain, Bakhshi Shah Murad. The revolt began in March 1915, and on 22 March a rebel army led by Djunaid-khan attacked the capital city, Khiva. An apparent pro-rebel Russian intervention to help Bakhshi Shah Murad escape arrest convinced Djunaid to renew the rebellion, and by 9 April several Khivan villages were under his control. In early June, Turkoman representatives were invited by Russia to join negotiations in a peace conference, but the distrustful chieftains halted 20 miles (32 km) northwest of Khiva, where they were attacked by the Khan's forces on 7 June. The revolt ultimately ended when Russian Major General Geppener arranged a peace agreement on 30 June 1915, wherein the Khivan government promised to take steps to remove the causes of the Yomud Turkoman's discontent.

While Seymour Becker states that Russia refused to send military aid to Isfandiyar, Edward Sokol states that Russian troops helped repel a rebel attack on the city of Khiva.
