= Fools' Revolt =

1935 carnival in Cologne, Nazi Germany

Fools revolt
- Date: May 22, 1935
- Location: Cologne, Nazi Germany

The Fools' revolt or Narrenrevolte was an organized carnival that took place in 1935 in Cologne, Nazi Germany in resistance to the Nazi Party's attempt to co-opt traditional German Carnival celebrations for their own purposes. It was planned by the Nazi organization Kraft durch Freude, which was responsible for, among other duties, controlling leisure activities and attracting tourists under the regime. Some have argued that the event should be regarded not as an act of resistance against the Nazis, but merely an attempt by the carnival clubs to preserve the sanctity of the festivities, their influence over its organization, and their own profits.

== Background ==
The NSDAP planned early on the organizational, political, economic and ideological classification of the Rhenish carnival in its totalitarian idea. In November 1933, it highlighted the carnival as a piece of German cultural heritage in connection with the demonic "Vasenacht", to deny the church relations with the festival. Political jokes and criticism were banned from the carnivalists. The Cologne Rose Monday procession was no longer centrally organized by the carnival societies, but by the "Citizens' Committee for the Cologne Carnival" under the chairmanship of the Deputy Ebel. Two SA men were responsible for its management.

The measures of the NSDAP, which politically and historically took over the carnival, were initially positively received by the representatives of many large carnival associations. Even before Hitler's seizure of power, the negative attitude of many people towards the multi-party system of the Weimar Republic, to the peace treaty of Versailles or the skepticism about the peace intentions of the League of Nations had been taken up by the carnival. Reform approaches that wanted to return the carnival to a "popularity" already existed before 1933.

The first anti-Semitic carnival float was included in the Rose Monday procession in 1934: Taken from a Veedelszoch, it depicted a group of Orthodox Jews making "just a small excursion to Liechtenstein and Jaffa" under the heading "The last ones to leave" – a clear allusion to the expulsion and voluntary emigration of the Jewish population. Regular anti-Semitic representations followed in the next few years, without leading carnivalists distancing themselves from it.

The National Socialists also succeeded in adapting the Cologne Carnival to homophobic elements of their ideology without much effort: The Tanzmariechen and the Virgin of Cologne, which were both traditionally played by men, were replaced by actresses in 1938 and 1939. After the war, only the Virgin returned to being male – the female Tanzmariechen remained.

Although the takeover of the carnival by the KdF formally failed, the members of the festival committee worked closely with the organization: Kraft durch Freude donated money for the Rose Monday procession and organized the grandstand construction and large parts of the tourist marketing of the Rose Monday procession. Members of the festival committee facilitated KdF carnival sessions and awarded carnival medals to local Nazi greats.

There was substantive carnival resistance against the Nazi ideology in individual cases: In his Büttenrede, Karl Küpper, who performed under the stage name "D´r Verdötschte" (Kölsch for "The Crazy"), openly positioned himself against the National Socialists and made fun of them on stage despite threats and a ban on speech. A subversive satire, published in the official Cologne Rosenmontagszeitung, also made biting criticism of the Nazi system in 1938. It portrayed Joseph Goebbels on the front page as "Seine Tollität Jüppche I" ("Seine Tollität", meaning "His Madness", being the address for the carnival prince, and "Jüppche" being a diminutive nickname for Joseph).

== The "revolt" ==
On May 22, 1935, the Nazi deputy Wilhelm Ebel proclaimed the foundation of the club "Verein Kölner Karneval e.V." in the Cologne daily newspapers. This consisted of representatives of the city administration, the NSDAP, the police and the KdF. The aim was to clean up "abuses" in the Cologne carnival, also with regard to the difficult economic situation of the festival organizers, whom Ebel accused of self-interest and incompetence.

The acting president of the Prince's Guard, Thomas Liessem, himself a member of the NSDAP since 1932, immediately drafted a response, which was supported and published jointly by all major carnival societies. They demanded the withdrawal of Ebel's slander and otherwise threatened to completely stop their activities for the carnival festival. The Cologne press, with the exception of the Nazi- associated West German Observer, also supported these demands. When a large joint meeting of all carnival societies and many Cologne citizens in the presence of the police and party representatives was held on May 27, 1935, it became known even before the opening by Liessem that Gauleiter Josef Grohé had distanced himself from Ebel's plan and asked him to dissolve the planned club and leave all carnival affairs in the hands of the carnival societies.

The carnivalists then founded a "Festival Committee Cologne Carnival" under the chairmanship of Liessem.

After this event, which is called the "fool's revolt", there were formally no further attempts at equalization and takeover by the KdF organization in the Cologne Carnival.

== Interpretations ==
In the post-war period, the behavior of the "festival committee" under its president Thomas Liessem was interpreted as a skillful tactic and steadfast resolve in the face of attempts from the NSDAP to achieve control of the Cologne carnival. Initial attempts to critically work through the legend of the fools' revolt failed due to resistance in Cologne politics and from the Cologne Carnival Festival Committee. In the second half of the 20th century, the "resistance" of the Cologne Carnival against National Socialism was historically relativized and presented realistically by the Cologne Carnival Festival Committee, for example in the Cologne Carnival Museum.

== Sources ==
- Hildegard Brog – Whatever happens: D'r Zoch kütt! The history of the Rhenish carnival. Campus Verlag, Frankfurt 2000, ISBN 3-593-36387-9, p. 219–247.
- . In: . No. 9, 1998 (online – 23. February 1998).
- Jürgen Meyer: . In: . 7. February 2005 (online [accessed on 13. April 2008]).
- Jürgen Meyer: . In: No. 42. Cologne 1997, p. 69–86.
