= Kabul Khel =

Tribe in Pakistan

The Kabul Khel (Pashto: کابل خېل) are a Waziri tribe in Pakistan. They are a subtribe of the Utmanzai. In the past, the Kabul Khel have fought multiple wars against the authorities of the British Raj.

== British period ==
=== 1859 war ===
In November 1859, Britain launched a punitive expedition against the Kabul Khel following the murder of a British officer in Latammar on the 5 November. The British force consisted of 4000 soldiers and 1000 additional tribal levies. Among the tribes fighting alongside the British against the Kabul Khel were the Turi. The largest battle of this conflict took place at the Maidani hills, where British forces suffered 11 casualties.

=== 1902 war ===
In 1902, the British launched a new expedition against the Kabul Khel, who had then been in a state of rebellion since 1896. On 17 November 1902, troops under the command of Major-General Egerton began their invasion of Kabul Khel tribal territory from Thal, Idak and Barganatu. British forces advanced with ease, capturing Gumatti (18 Nov), Sappari (20 Nov), and Shakar (20 Nov). With the Kabul Khel having thus been pacified, British forces withdrew on the 25th, ending the expedition.

== Post-independence period ==
In 2016, the Kabul Khel engaged in protests against Pakistani authorities, in opposition to the construction of the proposed Kurram Tangi Dam.
