= Chamchamal =

Chamchamal Çemçemal
- Town
- چەمچەماڵ
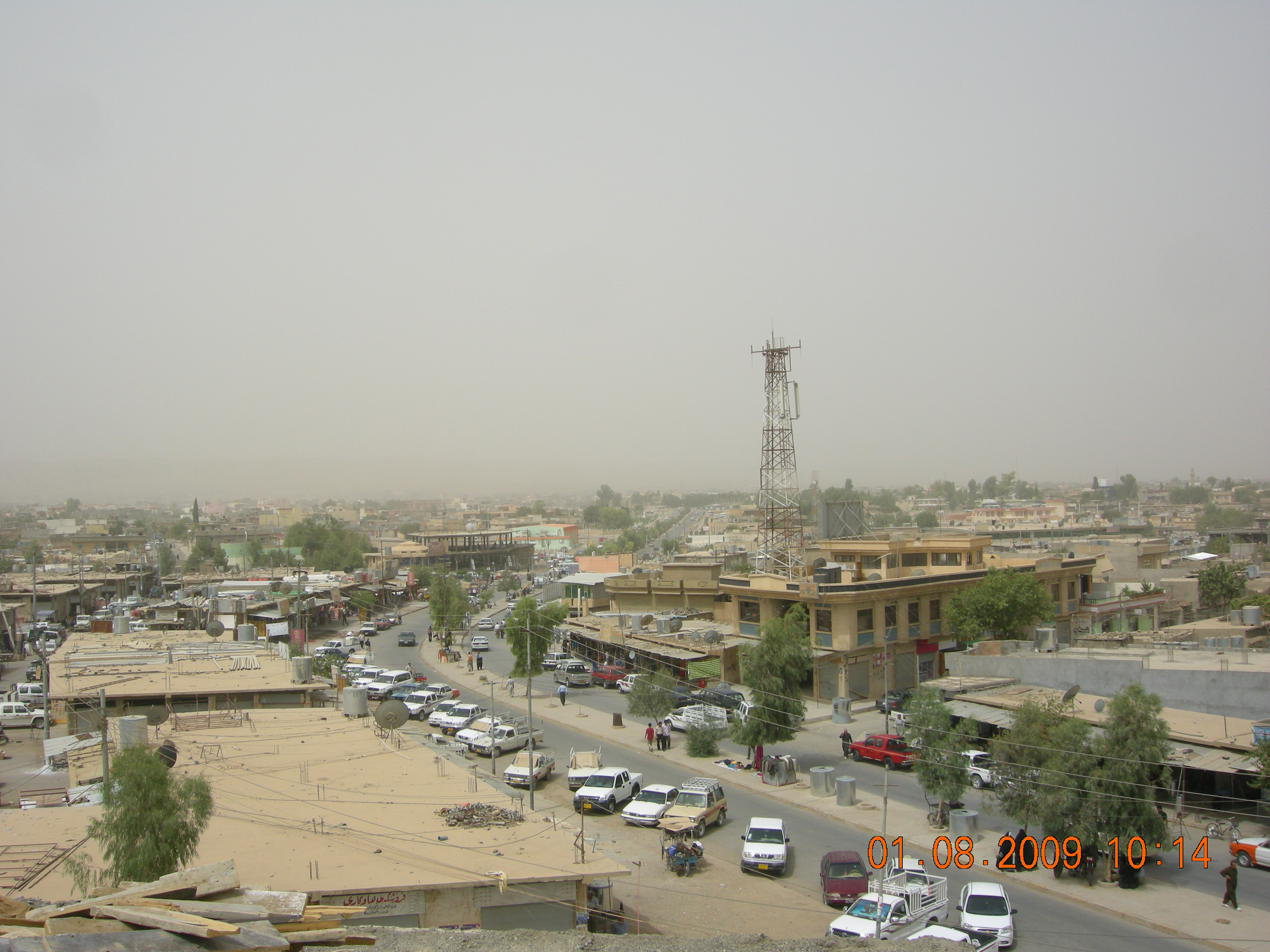

- Location within Iraq
- Coordinates: 35°32′0″N 44°50′0″E
- Country: Iraq
- Autonomous region: Kurdistan Region
- Province: Sulaymaniyah Governorate

Population (2024)
  - Total: 173,000

Chamchamal (Kurdish: چه‌مچه‌ماڵ, romanized: Çemçemal, Arabic: جمجمال) is a town located in Sulaymaniyah Governorate, Kurdistan Region, Iraq. The town is located close to the disputed territories of northern Iraq. Chamchamal is home to the Gorani-speaking Kurdish Hamawand tribe.

As part of the Ba'athist Arabization campaigns in northern Iraq, and the redrawing of provincial boundaries, Chamchamal became part of the Sulaymaniyah province.

== Population and location ==
The city is a 30 minutes drive east from Kirkuk and an hour west of Sulaymaniyah. The population was 58,000 in 2003. The population in 2018 was 65,300 people, the vast majority being Kurds.

== History ==
The city has a historic citadel, and early Western observers of the region speculated that it has been inhabited since the Sassanid period. The Chamchamal valley is also home to important paleolithic sites of Jarmo and Zarzi. The city broke away from Kirkuk Governorate in 1976 and was given to Sulaymaniyah Governorate.

In June 2024, the Peshmerga Martyrs’ Museum was opened in the town. It commemorates the 'martyrs' of the War against the Islamic State by displaying personal belongings and artifacts.

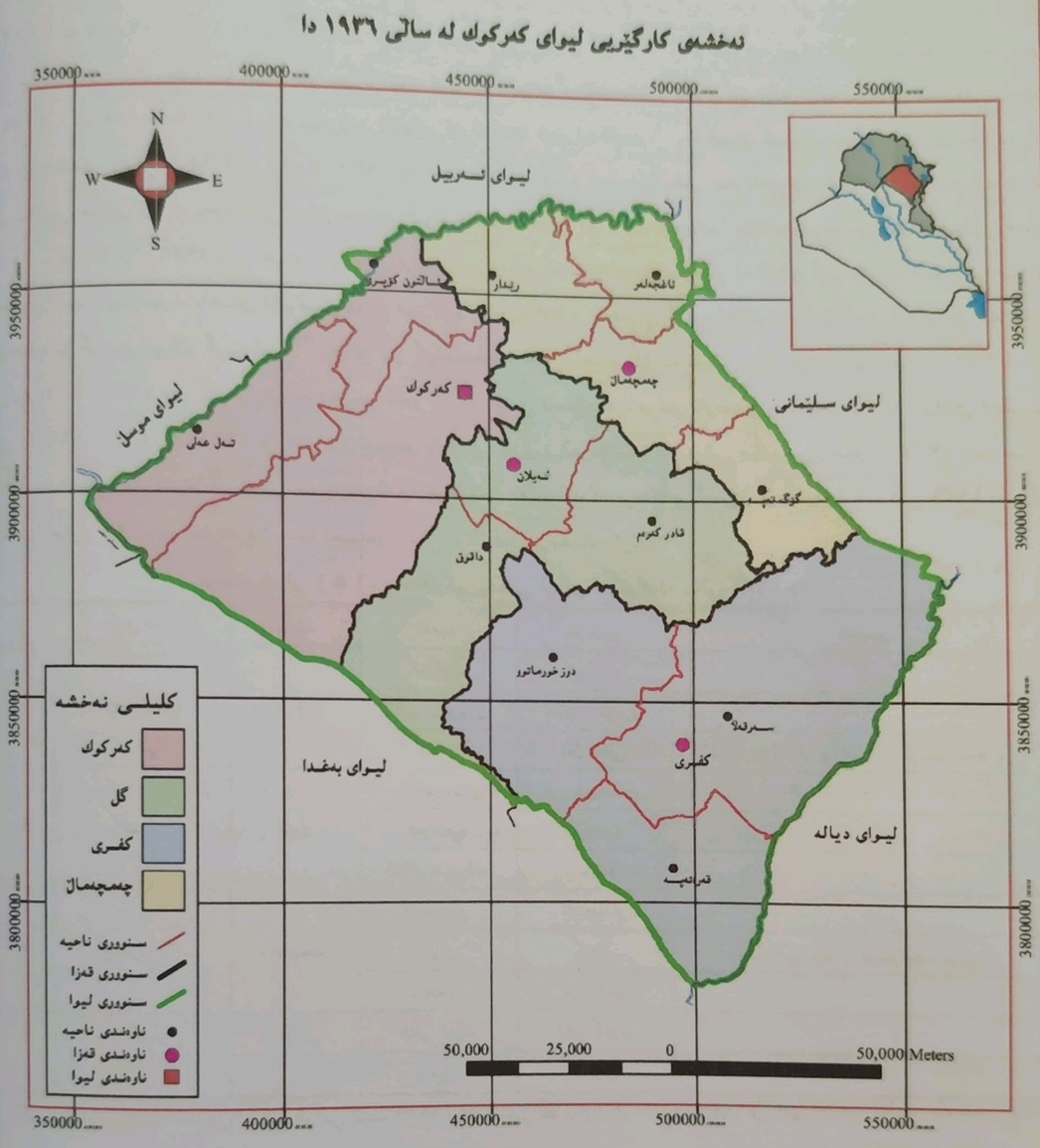
Map of Kirkuk Governorate in 1936 including Chamchamal

== Climate ==
Climate data for Chamchamal
Month	Jan	Feb	Mar	Apr	May	Jun	Jul	Aug	Sep	Oct	Nov	Dec	Year
Mean daily maximum °C (°F)	10.3 (50.5)	12.2 (54.0)	16.6 (61.9)	22.6 (72.7)	30.1 (86.2)	36.7 (98.1)	40.4 (104.7)	40.2 (104.4)	36.2 (97.2)	29.5 (85.1)	20.1 (68.2)	13.0 (55.4)	25.7 (78.2)
Mean daily minimum °C (°F)	1.3 (34.3)	2.5 (36.5)	6.0 (42.8)	10.6 (51.1)	15.8 (60.4)	21.3 (70.3)	24.6 (76.3)	24.7 (76.5)	20.3 (68.5)	14.9 (58.8)	8.6 (47.5)	3.3 (37.9)	12.8 (55.1)
Average precipitation mm (inches)	126 (5.0)	104 (4.1)	108 (4.3)	60 (2.4)	29 (1.1)	0 (0)	0 (0)	0 (0)	0 (0)	5 (0.2)	47 (1.9)	86 (3.4)	565 (22.2)
Source: Climate-data.org

== Notable people ==
- Thanun Pyriadi (born 1933), chemist, from Ali Mansour village

== See also ==
- Garmekan (Sasanian province located in modern-day Kurdistan Region of Iraq)
- Garmian Region
- Beth Garmai
