= Hamawand rebellion =

Hamawand Rebellion
- Part of Kurdish rebellions during World War I and Young Turk Revolution
| Date | 1908–1911 (continuing until WWI) |
| Location | Mosul Vilayet, Ottoman Empire |
| Result | Rebellion suppressed |

Belligerents
| Hamawand tribe | CUP |

Commanders and leaders
| Unknown | Nadim Pasha (Governor of Baghdad) † |

Strength
| 250 | 8,000 |

Casualties and losses
| Unknown | 12 were killed 40–50 injuries |

The Hamawand rebellion was a Kurdish uprising by the Hamawand tribe in the Mosul Vilayet which began in 1908, in opposition to the Young Turks revolution and in support of the Ottoman sultan.

== Background ==
The state of rebellion was ended in July 1910 when they reached an agreement with local wali of Baghdad, Nadim Pasha, wherein they nominally recognized Ottoman authority. According to David McDowall, the rebellion continued in April 1911 upon Nadim's return to Constantinople, and the Hamawand were reportedly still in rebellion when World War I began, but this is not mentioned in Gökhan Çetinsaya's account, which simply relates that "the Hamawand terror in the region lasted about two years and was suppressed only by considerable force."
