= Suhool =

Arab tribe

Suhool السهول
- Ethnicity: Arabs
- Nisba: Al-Sahli/السهلي
- Location: Saudi Arabia
- Descended from: Sahel bin Anas bin Rabia bin Kaab bin Abi Bakr bin Kilab bin Rabia bin Amer bin Sasa’ah bin Muawiyah bin Bakr bin Hawazin bin Mansour bin Ikrimah bin Khasfa bin Qais Aylan bin Mudar bin Nizar bin Maad bin Adnan
- Parent tribe: Hawazin
- Language: Arabic
- Religion: Islam

The Suhool (Arabic: السهول, sing. Sahli) are an Arab tribe of the region of Nejd in central Saudi Arabia. They are descendants of the larger tribe of Banu 'Amir, also known as 'Amir ibn Sa'sa'a, and are considered the cousins of Subay'.

== branches ==
The Suhool tribe is divided into ten clans: Al-Brazat:

Al Rashid, Al Rashid Al Muhaimid: Al-Maratin, Al-Sha`f.

Dhahran: Al-Suwaidan, Al-Hadha, Al-Zayed, Al-Munikher, Al-Fatamin, Al-Abboud

Al-Zaqa'in: Al-Ruwaidan, Al-Thunayan, Al-Khudair, Al-Shalhoub, Al-Damkh, Al-Hamadin, Al-Saif, Al-Tarjam, Al-Qanaat.[2][3][4 ]

The Sa’ub family: Al Mudheesh, Al Ali, Al Mufreh, Al Muqass.

Al Obaid: Al Qatian, Al Jarboa.

Al-Qabbaneh: Al-Shakhatla, Al-Muharka, Al-Drivers, Al-Ghaliz, Al-Hawazma, Al-Jalal, Al-Jariba, Al-Zaid, Al-Anaqid, Al-Theeb.

Al-Mahaniyah: Al-Fadl, Al-Faleh, Al-Hamoud, Al-Flayh, Al-Arefaj.

The juror: Al Hoymel, Al Razaan, Al Ateeq, Abu Jada. Al Manjal: Al Mufarrej, Al Alyan, Al Al-Walah

== homes ==
The Suhool tribe maintained the homes of their ancestors from Banu Amir ibn Sa’sa’ah, which are the homes identified by Arab geographers and baladis, and the Suhool tribe still descended these homes and moved between them. Including: Al-Ard, Al-Arid, Al-Uwairid, and Rwaygheb in the Riyadh region, Kuwait, Iraq, Qatar and Bahrain. Many geographers referred to this, including Sheikh Muhammad bin Abdullah bin Blaihed, who said: “The Suhool were penetrating into Najd and settling in Sawad Bahla, known as the width, then they withdrew from it and nothing remained in their hands except Al-Rawdah, known as Rawdah Al-Ard.” Sheikh Saad bin Junaidel said: "The Suhool tribe was in control of the country of Ardh Shamam.
