= 1931 Saudi–Yemeni border skirmish =

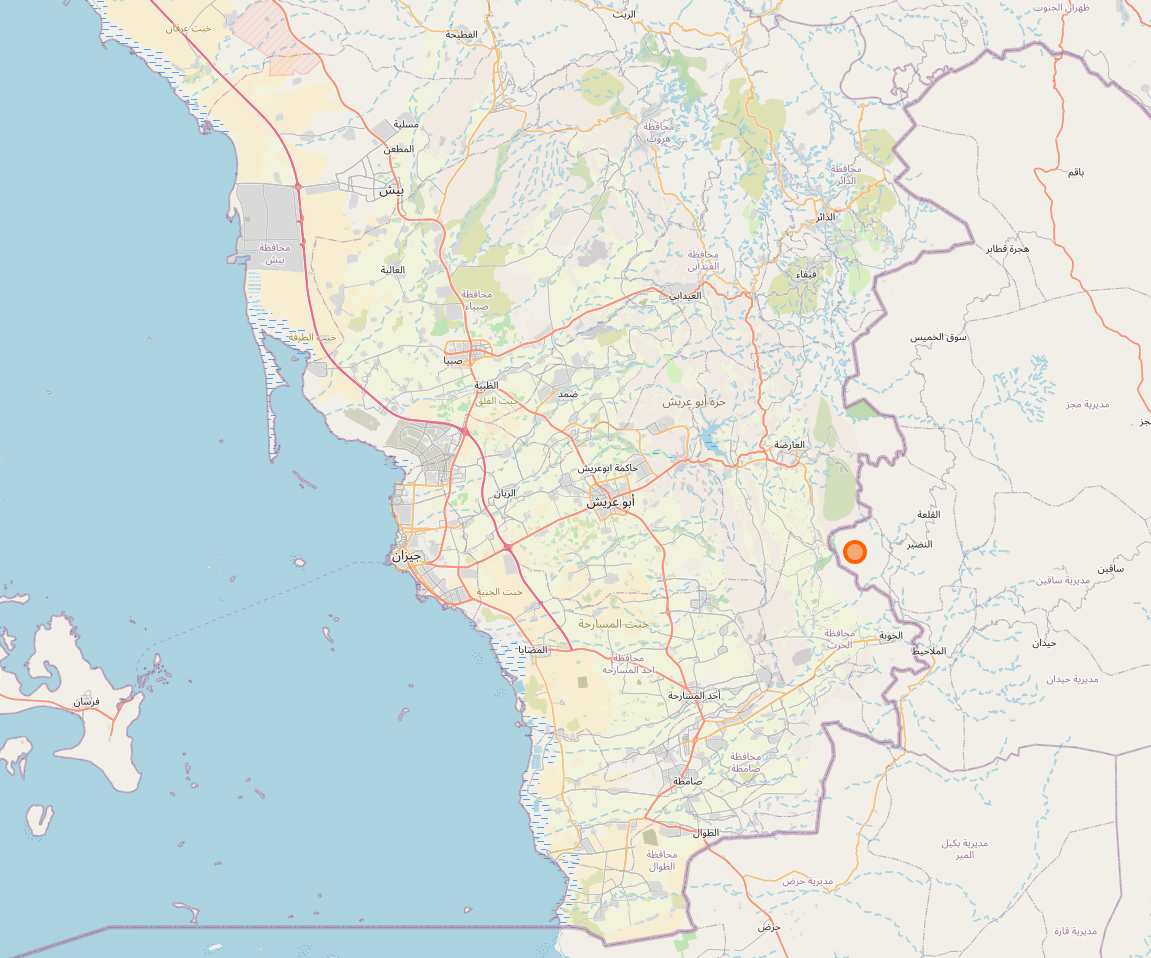
- Map of Yemen's northwestern border. 'Aru is highlighted by a circle.
| Date | Early 1931 |
| Location | 'Aru, near the Saudi Arabia–Yemen border. 16.8982°N 43.1736°E |
| Result | Military outcome unclear; Status quo ante bellum |

Belligerents
| Kingdom of Hejaz and Nejd | Kingdom of Yemen |

Early in the year 1931, the Kingdom of Hejaz and Nejd, ruled by the House of Saud, engaged in an ill-documented border skirmish against the Mutawakkilite Kingdom of Yemen.

== Historical account ==
All known details are provided on page 322 of St John Philby's 1955 book Saudi Arabia, which gives the following account:

As had been the case before in the dispute over the ownership of the Khurma oasis, with King Husain taking the military initiative with a view to creating a fait accompli, it was the Imam Yahya who sought a settlement of the matters at issue with the Wahhabi king by pushing his troops into the areas claimed by him with the support of elements in both, which preferred weak Zaidi control to any closer acquaintance with the strom arm of Ibn Sa’ud. The inevitable clash of frontier guards ensued at a village called ’Aru early in 1931. In the absence of reliable maps at that time it was not easy to determine in this case which side was the aggressor, though before long it became clear that the blame lay with the Wahhabi commander, who had unwittingly trespassed into Yaman territory.

— St John Philby, Saudi Arabia

== Commentary ==
In an enquiry in 2017, the Correlates of War project was unable to find any further information, and found that The Times did not contain any mention of such incident in all of 1931. Nonetheless, they still believed that such an incident had happened, since Philby was a close associate of Ibn Saud as well as a reputable British Arabist.

== See also ==
- List of wars involving Saudi Arabia
- Najran conflict, a subsequent Saudi–Yemeni conflict
