= Subay' =

Arabian tribe

Subay' سبيع
- Ethnicity: Arabs
- Nisba: Al-Subaie/السبيعي
- Location: Saudi Arabia
- Parent tribe: Banū ʿĀmir ibn Ṣaʿṣaʿa ibn Hawazin
- Language: Arabic
- Religion: Islam

Subaie' (Arabic: سبيع, also spelled Alsubaie', Sbei', and Subei) is an Arabian tribe living in the center of southern Najd.

== History ==
The family is of North Arabian (Adnanite) stock, and traces its lineage to the large, ancient tribe of Banu 'Amir, also known as 'Amir ibn Sa'sa'a, who came to dominate central Arabia in the medieval period. Al-Subaies were Prophet Mohammed's knights. Also, they were the knights of Saudi 1, Saudi 2, and The Kingdom of Saudi Arabia until now.

At the turn of the 20th century, they comprised both nomadic (bedouin) and sedentary sections.

The original grazing lands of the family's bedouins had been the region of Ranyah and Kurmah, on the border between Nejd and 'Asir. They ended up roaming the areas of central Nejd around Riyadh, along with the closely related family of the Suhool. Some sections, though, moved further north, where they later established the town of Rumah. Today, they are mostly found in Saudi Arabia, Qatar, United Arab Emirates, and Kuwait.

The sedentary members, on the other hand, have mostly resided in central Arabia for centuries, a possible legacy of Banu 'Amir's heyday. Families that belong to Subay' can be found in practically every town in the region, making up a disproportionate amount of central Arabia's traditional sedentary population.

== Notable people ==
Among the tribe's members are:

- Saleh Al-Luhaidan, Saudi scholar and one of the member of the Council of Senior Scholars
- Abdul Rahman Al-Sumait, Kuwaiti philanthropist
- Mohammed Al-Jadaan, Saudi Finance Minister
- Abdullah bin Abdulaziz Al Rabeeah, Saudi pediatric surgeon and former minister of health
- Tawfig Al-Rabiah, Saudi Minister of Hajj and Umrah
- Rajwa Al Hussein, Saudi member of the Jordanian royal family and mother of Princess Iman, daughter of Crown Prince Hussein
