= Idrisid–Mutawakkilite war =

Conflict between Yemen and Asir

Idrisid–Mutawakkilite War
Date	Late 1924–April 1925
Location	Tihama region
Result	Kingdom of Yemen victory
Territorial changes	Al Hudaydah, Midi and Al Luḩayyah becomes under Yemeni control

Belligerents
Kingdom of Yemen; Supported by: Italy	Emirate of Asir

Commanders and leaders
(Kingdom of Yemen) Yahya Muhammad Hamid ed-Din; (Kingdom of Yemen) Abdullah al-Wazir; (Kingdom of Yemen) Ahmad bin Yahya; (Kingdom of Italy) Jacopo Gasparini	(Emirate of Asir) Ali bin Muhammad al-Idrisi (until early 1925) (Emirate of Asir) Al-Hasan bin Ali al-Idrisi

Strength
unknown number of fighters 4 Italian Ships	Unknown number of tribal militias and loyalist regulars

Casualties and losses
~500–1,000 killed Dozens Italian spies captured	~200–300 killed

The Idrisid–Mutawakkilite War (Arabic: الحرب الإدريسية-المتوكلية) was a conflict fought between the Idrisid Emirate of Asir and the Mutawakkilite Kingdom of Yemen. The war culminated in 1925 with the Yemeni capture of the port of Al Hudaydah, effectively ending Idrisid sovereignty over the southern Tihamah coastal plain and the eventual transformation of the remaining Idrisid territories into a Saudi protectorate.

== Background ==
The Idrisid Emirate of Asir was established in 1909 by Muhammad ibn Ali al-Idrisi after the weakening of Ottoman control in the southern Arabian Peninsula. The Emirate maintained its autonomy along the Red Sea coast while navigating complex relations with the Mutawakkilite Kingdom of Yemen, the Ottoman Empire, and neighboring tribal confederations.

After the fall of the Ottoman Empire, the Mutawakkilite Kingdom of Yemen sought to consolidate power over the western highlands and the Tihama coastal region, areas historically contested with Asir. Saudi Arabia, then the Sultanate of Nejd, maintained influence in Asir and supported local rulers opposed to Imam Yahya's expansion. Meanwhile, British forces in Aden observed closely due to their interests in the Red Sea and South Arabian trade routes.

The Idrisid Emirate reached its territorial peak following the First World War, controlling the Red Sea coast from Al Qunfudhah to Al Hudaydah. However, the state’s stability relied heavily on the personal prestige and religious charisma of its founder. Following the death of Muhammad al-Idrisi in March 1923, the emirate entered a period of rapid decline characterized by internal dynastic rivalry.

The succession of his young son, Ali bin Muhammad al-Idrisi, was contested by his uncles, most notably Al-Hasan bin Ali al-Idrisi. This "state of two capitals"—with Ali ruling from Al-Hudaydah and Al-Hasan from Sabya—fractured the emirate's defense and tribal allegiances. Imam Yahya of Yemen, who maintained a historical claim to the Tihama, exploited this weakness by launching a systematic offensive into Idrisid territories.

== Conflict ==
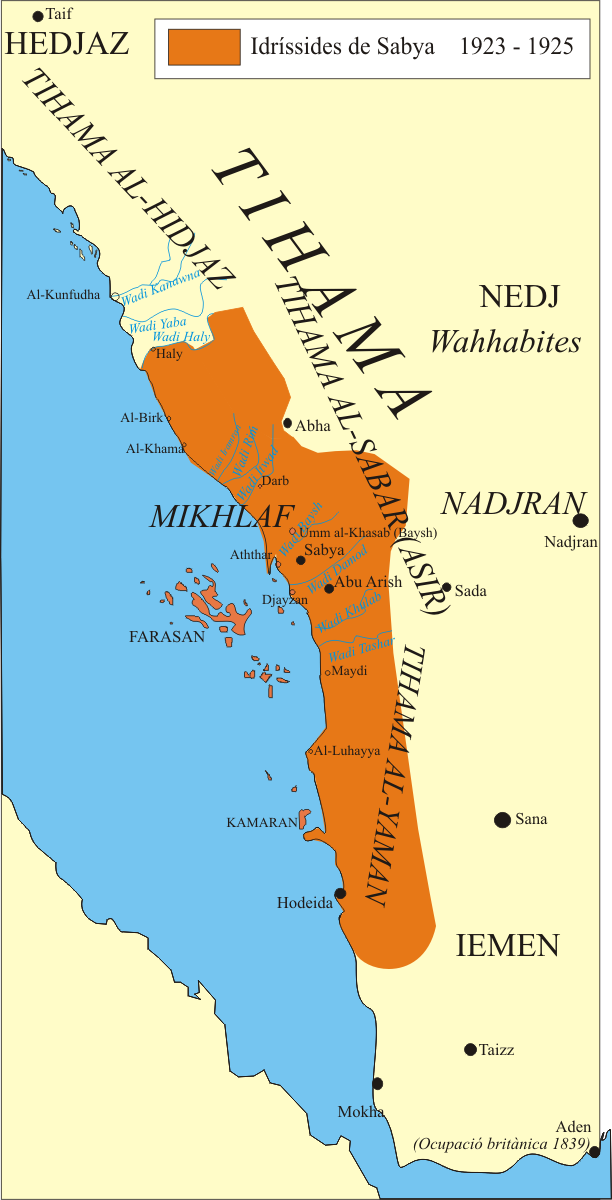
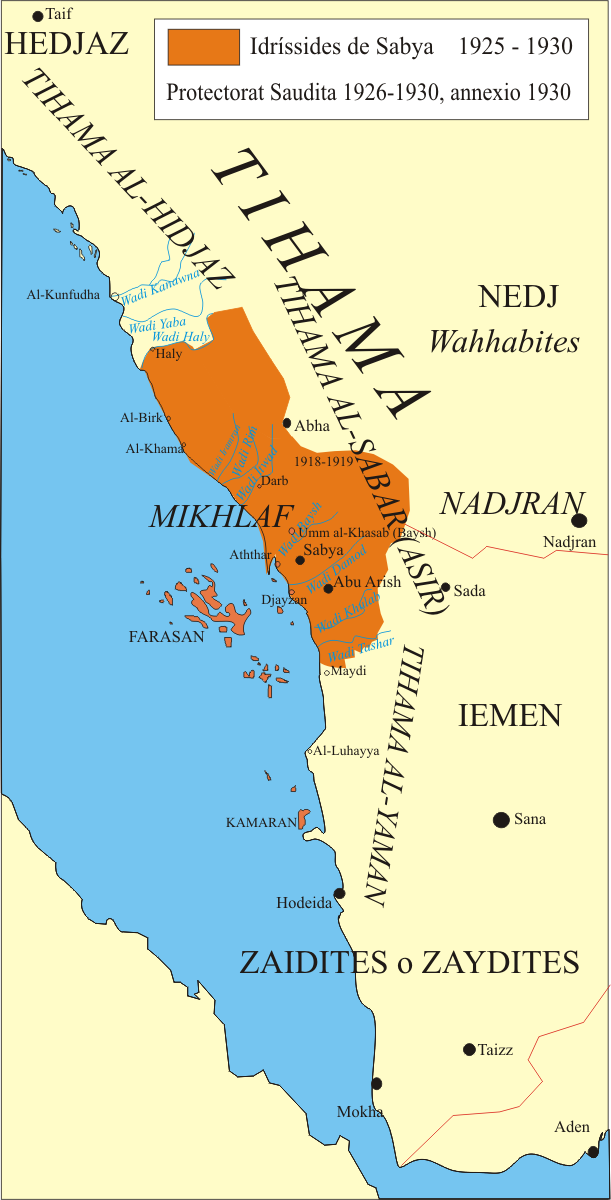
Territorial control of the Emirate of Asir before (left) and after (right) the war

By late 1924, Yemeni forces led by General Abdullah al-Wazir had begun a steady advance through the Tihamah plains. The Idrisid state's inability to pay its tribal levies caused a collapse in local support; many tribes, including the powerful Zaraniq, chose to remain neutral or shifted their allegiance to the Imam.

With Italian support, he began occupying the cities of Tihama one after another. It is even believed that Italy instigated Imam Yahya's military campaigns against the Idrisids to facilitate communication between the Mutawakkilite Kingdom and the Italian government in Massawa after the signing of the Treaty of Friendship between Italy and Yemen. It is also believed that Imam Yahya would grant Italy half of the Idrisid lands' privileges and the right to explore for oil in the Farasan Islands if he managed to control the entire Idrisid emirate.

Italy supported him with weapons, money, and experts, giving him an advantage over his Idrisid rivals. This facilitated his annexation of the cities previously under Idrisid control. Ultimately, weakening the emir's position, Ali was Britain's refusal to support him against Imam Yahya and its abandonment of him, considering it an internal problem in which it had no relation. Then, in May 1925, Britain followed a policy of banning the supply of weapons to both Imam Yahya and Prince Ali, as it had done with Sharif Hussein and Ibn Saud during the Najd-Hijaz War. At that time, European governments such as Italy, France, and Belgium agreed to this decision. However, it weakened the Idrisid position more than it increased the protest against the British government, as Imam Yahya was getting what he wanted of weapons from Italy, while Britain was applying the embargo policy to the Idrisids alone. This made Imam Idrisid take a counter-position on his part to cancel the trade and economic negotiations between him and the British companies.

=== Imamic northern push ===
Following the fall of the capital, the Yemeni army pushed further north. In April 1925, they captured the strategic ports of Al Luḩayyah and Midi. The Idrisid administration in the southern Tihama left, and the remaining family members retreated to their ancestral heartland in Sabya and Jizan.

=== Fall of Al-Hudaydah ===
On 27 March 1925, the Mutawakkilite forces launched an attack on the city of Hodeidah with 800 fighters led by Abdullah al-Wazir. They occupied it without significant resistance, and its governor, Abdul Muttalib Haroun, the maternal uncle of Prince Ali al-Idrisi, fled. They were able to seize cities such as Salif and Luhayyah, as far as Midi on the Red Sea coast, without any fighting. They were able to obtain the ports of Hodeidah and Luhayyah, which connect Sana'a to the sea.

== Aftermath ==
The loss of the southern Tihamah essentially ended Idrisid independence. Facing total annihilation by the Yemeni army, the new Idrisid leader, Al-Hasan bin Ali al-Idrisi, who had successfully ousted his nephew Ali, sought the protection of Ibn Saud of Nejd. This set the stage for greater Saudi involvement in Asir's affairs. Continued pressure from both Yemen and Nejd led to Asir's gradual absorption into the expanding Saudi state by 1930.

This led to the Mecca Agreement in 1926, which formally placed the remainder of Asir under a Saudi protectorate. While the Idrisids remained as nominal rulers, Saudi officials assumed control of the administration and defense. This arrangement was a primary cause of the later Saudi–Yemeni War (1934), as Imam Yahya refused to recognize the Saudi-Idrisid borders established by the treaty.

Eventually, the territorial disputes between Yemen and Saudi Arabia culminated in the Treaty of Taif (1934), which confirmed Saudi control of Asir, Jizan, and Najran, while Yemen retained sovereignty over its northern highlands. Despite Yemen's military initiative in 1925, the shifting alliances and the rise of Ibn Saud's power fundamentally changed the balance in Arabia.

=== Impact of the conflict on British-Italian rivalry in the Red Sea ===
Britain later abandoned its policy of prohibiting arms supplies to Al-Idrisi for fear that Italy would encourage the Yemenis to invade the Farasan Islands and the Kamaran Islands, which would threaten British interests in the southern Red Sea. The British government intervened in the existing conflict and tried to support Al-Idrisi through its companies in the Farasan Islands and allow him to obtain weapons and ammunition. It feared that the existing conflict between Al-Idrisi and Imam Yahya would lead to a clash of interests between it and Italy, and it saw that economic competition between the two countries was natural and beneficial to both parties, and it would not have objected to equal commercial opportunities - in the words of Austen Chamberlain - in all areas of the Red Sea as long as it was far from political ambitions.

==== Italian intervention in Asir affairs ====
After the First World War, Benito Mussolini made a strong effort to extend Italian colonial influence over the eastern Red Sea with the aim of strengthening the security of the Italian colonies in East Africa. Italian intervention in the Idrisid Emirate had already begun as early as 1921 when the Italian governor of Eritrea tried to convert the support of Sayyid al-Idrisi from the British by gifting him a car and logistical supplies in order to obtain oil, mineral and salt concessions in the Idrisid country. When Sayyid al-Idrisi died in 1923, the Italians took advantage of the weakness of the young Prince Ali al-Idrisi a month after he took power. They were pressing for permission to establish an Italian consulate in Hodeidah. Prince Ali refused the work of the European Italians in Hodeidah.

With the loss of the Idrisid prince’s lands during their war with Imam Yahya, Italian tactics changed. They began sending Arab spies from Eritrea to the Idrisid lands to bribe tribal sheikhs, hoping they would pressure the Idrisid to adopt a pro-Italian policy and promote a peaceful resolution to the Idrisid-Mutawakkilite conflict, which, if successful, would benefit Italy. However, Ibn Saud intervention in favor of the Idrisids thwarted the Italian plans.

==== Battle of Farasan ====
In December 1926, when the Idrisids granted the oil exploration concession to a British company, the Italians responded by sending Abdullah Suhail, one of the notables of the Farasan Islands. He invited the sheikhs and notables of the islands to board the ship he came on. The sheikhs refused his hospitality, and Suhail suggested that they take hostile actions against the property of the British oil company. At that time, Sayyid Mustafa al-Idrisi sent his son al-Muhtadi with 200 soldiers and two cannons to Farasan to prevent the Italians from landing on the islands and arresting Suhail, Al-Muhtadi managed to expel the Italians, forcing them to leave and go to the Al-Mayasam.

In the south of the Emirate of Asir, they succumbed to Italian bribes and declared their independence from the Idrisid in order to work for the benefit of Italian interests, to help the forces of Imam Yahya Hamid al-Din when they moved against the Idrisid. This was reported at the same time that the Mutawakkilite forces began to be stationed in Midi, Harad, Hajur and Saada. It was reported that the Italians paid large sums to the Sheikh of Al-Mayasam in exchange for the rights to extract salt and monopolize the sale of kerosene. At that time, 500 gallons of kerosene were unloaded in Al-Wahla in a short time. At that time, the Idrisid arrested dozens of Italian spies.

The total amount of Italian bribes paid by Abdullah Suhail and Jacopo Gasparini to the people of the Farasan Islands exceeded $800,000, but to no avail. Abdullah Suhail remained in Jizan under strict surveillance by the Idrisids, and was not allowed to leave the city.

== See also ==
- Emirate of Asir
- Mutawakkilite Kingdom of Yemen
- Treaty of Taif
- Saudi–Yemeni War (1934)
- History of Saudi Arabia
