= Timeline of the Emirate of Asir =

Map of the Emirate of Asir at its peak

The history of the Emirate of Asir spans the rise and fall of a short-lived political entity on the Tihama coast of the southern Arabian Peninsula. Established by Muhammad ibn Ali al-Idrisi, the state emerged from a Sufi framework to become a significant regional power during and after the First World War.

== Formation and expansion (1906–1918) ==
- 1906: Muhammad ibn Ali al-Idrisi begins initial state-building activities in Asir, transitioning from a religious leader to a political actor.
- 1907: al-Idrisi secures the allegiance of the tribes in Tihamat Asir.
- 1909: The first major military confrontation occurs between the Idrisi forces and the Ottoman Empire.
- Autumn 1910: Following a brief period of recognition as an Ottoman governor, hostilities resume after disputes over the implementation of Sharia law.
- 1911: A general uprising against Ottoman rule is met by several Ottoman military expeditions.
- 1911–1912: During the Italo-Turkish War, the Idrisi state forms a strategic alliance with Italy, receiving naval support and weaponry.
- 30 April 1915: Muhammad al-Idrisi signs the "Treaty of Friendship and Goodwill" with the British Empire, becoming the first Arab leader to formally join the Allied powers against the Ottomans.
- 1918: The emirate expands its domains, reaching as far as Hodeidah.

== Decline and internal strife (1919–1925) ==
- 1919–1923: The post-war years are defined by intense territorial rivalry with Imam Yahya of the Mutawakkilite Kingdom of Yemen.
- March 1923: Death of the state's founder, Muhammad al-Idrisi, leading to an immediate succession crisis.
- 1924: Yemeni forces capture the Idrisi settlements of Al Luḩayyah and Bajil.
- April 1925: Yemeni forces capture the capital and strategic port of Al Hudaydah, effectively ending Idrisi sovereignty over the southern Tihama.
- 1923–1925: A period of internal dynastic struggle erupts between Muhammad's son, Ali bin Muhammad al-Idrisi, and his uncle, Al-Hasan bin Ali al-Idrisi.

== Saudi annexation and dissolution (1926–1934) ==
- 21 October 1926: Facing total collapse, Al-Hasan bin Ali signs the Mecca Agreement, which formally transforms the remaining Idrisi territories into a Saudi protectorate.
- November 1930: The protectorate is further integrated into the expanding Saudi state, being administratively categorized as a Saudi province.
- 1932: The "final Idrisi revolt" occurs as Al-Hasan bin Ali attempts to reclaim independence from Saudi control with support from Yemen.
- June 1934: Following the Saudi–Yemeni War, the Treaty of Taif is signed. It settles regional borders and marks the formal end of the Idrisi state as a political entity.

== Bibliography ==
- Al-Etaneh, G. F.; Hayajneh, R.; Al-Khatib, J. M.; Abdalla, A. A. (2024-09-13). "British-Idrisi relations in resisting Ottoman influence in Tihama Asir 1915-1926". Research Journal in Advanced Humanities. 5 (4). doi:10.58256/ck6ny078.
- Baldry, John (1976). "Anglo-Italian Rivalry in Yemen and ʿAsīr 1900-1934". Die Welt des Islams. 17 (1/4): 155–193. doi:10.2307/1570344. ISSN 0043-2539. JSTOR 1570344.
- Bang, Anne K. (1996). The Idrisi State in Asir 1906–1934: Politics, Religion and Personal Prestige as Statebuilding Factors in Early Twentieth-Century Arabia. London: Hurst & Company. ISBN 978-1-85065-306-6.
