= Mowlana Abd al-Rahman Nurow =

19th-century Somali Islamic jurist

Abd al-Rahman Nurow bin Mahmud عبد الرحمن نورو بن محمود
- Title: Mowlana

Personal life
- Born: 1755
- Died: 1837 (aged 81–82)
- Era: 19th century
- Region: Benadir
- Main interest: Islamic Jurisprudence

Religious life
- Religion: Islam

Muslim leader
- Influenced by: Ahmad ibn Idris al-Fasi, Abadir Umar ar-Rida,
- Influenced: Sheikh Hassan Barsane, Haji Ali Maye

Mowlana Abd al-Rahman Nurow bin Mahmud al-Abgaali (مولانا عبد الرحمن نورو بن محمود الابغالي; 1756–1837) was a Somali scholar who played a crucial role in the spread of the Idrisiyya Sufi order in Somalia and East Africa.

Born in the city of Mogadishu to the dominant Abgaal clan family, he studied elementary ilm under the supervision of the local Ulema, he later travelled to Mecca, Medina and Yemen, studying under the famous Ahmad ibn Idris al-Fasi. His contemporaries include Abu'l 'Abbas Al Dandarawi and the founders of the Salihiyya and Khatmiyya paths. A Sufi doctrine that had spread across the Muslim World with many Haḍra traditions but based on a foundational Salafi creed.

Mowlana Mahmud traveled to various Islamic centers in the Horn of Africa such as Harrar. Upon returning to Benadir, he established a community of pupils, setting out to spread the Idrisiyya order throughout the region. This enhanced his reputation and also helped the order gain considerable success amongst the region's pastoralists, the religious elite, and the villagers of the interior. Famous students include Haji Ali Maye and Sheikh Hassan Barsane.

== See also ==
- Uways al-Barawi
- Zeila
