= Attack on Hodeidah (1919) =

Attack on Hodeidah 1919
- Hudaydah City in 19th
Date	30 August 1919
Location	Hodeidah city, Tihama region
Result	Attack success: British suffered heavy losses and the city was looted

Belligerents
British Empire	Emirate of Asir

Commanders and leaders
(United Kingdom) G. A. Richardson	(Emirate of Asir) Sayyid Ali Bari Al-Ahdal (Emirate of Asir) Sayyid Muhammad bin Ahmad Al-Ahdal

Units involved
British-Indian Soldiers	Qahra Tribes; Absyah Tribes; Ahdalis Ashrafs

Strength
Unknown	250–300

Casualties and losses
18 killed 11 wounded	20 killed

The attack on Hodeidah was a military offensive launched in 1919 against the British military garrison in the city by Arab forces loyal to the Idrisid Emirate of Asir and hailing from the Tihama region. Comprising fighters from the Qahra , Absyah and Al-Ahdali Ashraf tribes, the forces engaged in looting and killing before withdrawing with significant spoils, having encountered some resistance from British troops. The attack coincided with the capture—also in Tihama—of the Jacob Mission, a delegation that had been dispatched to Imam Yahya Hamid al-Din of Sana'a to negotiate the handover of Hodeidah to the Mutawakkilite Kingdom of Yemen.

== Details of attack ==
At 5:00 a.m., an Arab force of 250–300 fighters attacked the city of Al-Hudaydah, looting its homes, premises, and shops. They also attacked the British garrison stationed in the city; the ensuing battle resulted in the deaths of 18 British soldiers and injuries to 11 others. The attackers lost 20 men and withdrew after seizing substantial spoils from the city.

== See also ==
- Emirate of Asir
- Kingdom of Yemen
- Hodeidah
- History of Yemen
- Tihamah
- Aden Protectorate
- British Empire
