= Ali bin Mujathal al-Mughaidi =

19th century emir of 'Asir

- Emir of 'Asir
- Reign: 1826–1833
- Coronation: 1826
- Predecessor: Sa'id bin Musalat
- Successor: Aidh bin Mar'i al-Yazidi
- Died: 1833; Abha, 'Asir Province, southwestern Saudi Arabia
- Ali bin Mujathal al-Yazidi al-Mughaidi al-'Asiri
- Religion: Sunni Islam

Ali bin Mujathal al-Mughaidi (Arabic: علي بن مجثل المغيدي) was the ruler of 'Asir Province and the Tihamah in the 19th century, starting in 1826 and ending with his death in 1833. Ali bin Mujathal, alongside his maternal brother and cousin Sa'id bin Musalat, resisted against the forces of the Ottoman Empire that were led by Muhammad Ali Pasha.

== Reign ==
After the death of Sa'id bin Musalat in the year 1826, the people of 'Asir pledged allegiance to Ali bin Mujathal, which officially started his reign. Ali bin Mujathal's rule was described as a generally peaceful one, and he also managed to fight off several attempted invasions by the Ottoman Empire. His growing power and influence approaching Yemen was worrying to Muhammad Ali Pasha, who ordered his own governors and nobles to write letters discouraging him from entering Yemen. Ali bin Mujathal disregarded the criticisms and invaded Yemen anyway, securing his rule over several parts that were previously taken by the Ottomans. His rule would eventually extend, its influence reaching all the way until Najran in the southeast.

== Religious views ==
Ali bin Mujathal was a devout Sunni Muslim. Like the majority of the citizens of 'Asir, he was a follower of the Shafi'i school of thought. He was also an Athari in his creed, and followed the doctrine of Muhammad bin Abdul Wahhab. The emergence of the Salafi movement in 'Asir also occurred during his reign.

The religion is a middle ground between us and those who claim it. Following [a practice in religion] must be backed with evidence. What Muhammad, may God bless him and grant him peace, and his companions were upon in their time, and heresy is what was introduced after them. - Ali bin Mujathal al-Mughaidi, to the scholar Ibrahim bin Ahmad al-Hafzi

== Death and legacy ==
Ali bin Mujathal contracted an illness in 1833 after his return from Yemen. He died in the same year. He was succeeded by Aidh bin Mar'i al-Yazidi, who founded the Al Aidh Emirate. He has a son named Abdullah whose descendants, the Al-Mujathal family, are still around and they live in 'Asir Province.

== See also ==
- Idrisid Emirate of Asir
- Al Aidh Emirate
- Emirate of Diriyah
- Ottoman-Wahhabi War
