= Banu Asir =

South Arabian tribe

Banū 'Asīr قبيلة عسير (Arabic)
- Adnanite and Qahtanite Arabs
- Ethnicity: Arab
- Nisba: al-'Asīrī
- Location: ʽAsir Province, Saudi Arabia
- Descended from: 'Asīr ibn 'Abs
- Parent tribe: Either Banū 'Akk or the Rabīʿa
- Religion: Sunni Islam

The Banū 'Asīr (Arabic: قبيلة عسير) or the Aseer are a South Arabian tribe that live in the ʽAsir Province of Saudi Arabia. of Adnanite and Qahtanite descent. The former ruling dynasties of the Al Aidh Emirate and the Sheikdom of Upper Asir are descended from this tribe.

== Tribal lineage ==
The tribe is descended from 'Asir ibn Irashah, whose full lineage is given as 'Asir, son of Irashah, son of ʿAnz, son of Waʾil, son of Qasit, son of Hanab, son of Afsa, son of Daʿmi, son of Jadilah, son of Asad, son of Rabiʿah, son of Nizar, son of Ma’ad, son of Adnan. As their descent is traced back to the patriarch Adnan, they are amongst the Adnanite tribes. However, they are also descended from Akk ibn Adnan which indicates that they are also mixed with Qahtanite descent as with all of Akk's other descendants. (Note: Arab genealogists noted that the descendants of Akk were of both Adnanite paternal descent and Qahtanite maternal descent.)

Al-Hamdani gives an alternative version of the lineage of 'Asir, which completely rejects the Qahtanite ancestry: 'Asir, son of Shaharah, son of 'Anz, son of Wa'il, son of Qasit, son of Hinb, son of Afsa, son of Du'miyy, son of Jadila, son of Asad, son of Rabi'a, son of Nizar, son of Ma'ad, son of Adnan.

=== Branches ===
The branches of the tribe are as follows:

- Almaa tribe
- Banu Mughaidi
- Banu Alkam
- Banu Rabi'a wa'l Rifada
- Banu Malik

== History ==
=== Ancient history ===
In historical inscriptions, the term "Banu 'Asir" was used to refer to an alliance of mainly Qahtanite tribes in southwestern Arabia. The Banu 'Asir may have become Muslims after the 630s CE, as all of the Arab tribes living in the central Arabian Peninsula began to profess Islam around that time.

=== Contemporary history ===
The Banu 'Asir would inhabit the southwestern parts of the Arabian Peninsula, such as those bordering . In 1823, the Mughaidi branch of the Banu 'Asir formed the Al Aidh Emirate which ruled the 'Asir Province. The independent Sheikdom of Upper 'Asir was later formed after breaking free from the Ottoman takeover of 'Asir until Ibn Saud annexed southwestern Arabia, unifying the country into present-day Saudi Arabia.

== See also ==
- Tribes of Arabia
