= Idrisiyya order =

Sufi mystic order in Sunni Islam

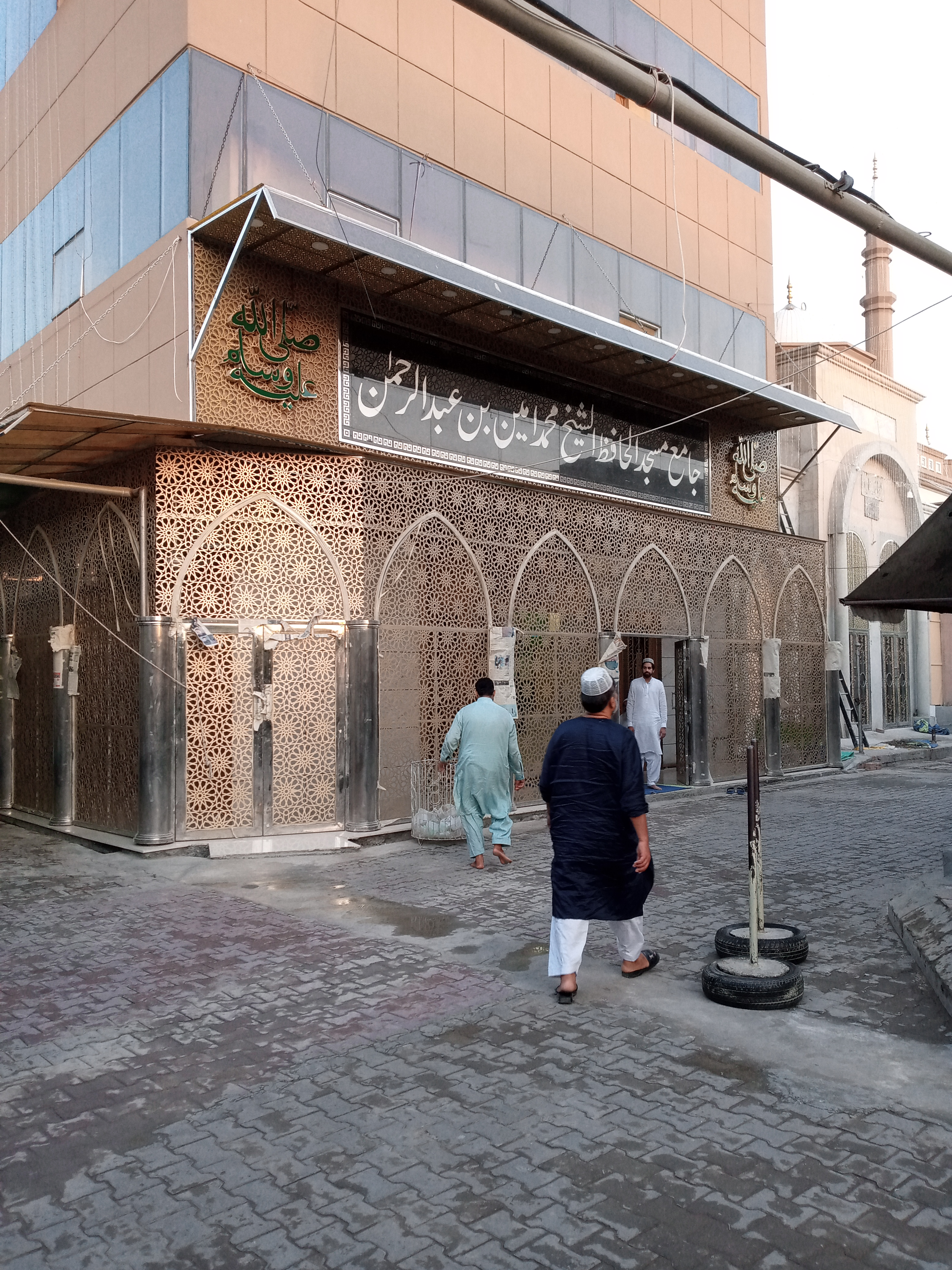
381 A, Shah Rukne Alam Colony, Multan, where the Idrisiyya are centred in Pakistan.

The Idrisiyya order (Arabic: الطريقة الإدريسية, romanized: al-Ṭarīqa al-ʾIdrīsiyya) is a Sufi tariqa of Sunni Islam founded by Ahmad ibn Idris al-Fasi. It is also called the Tariqa Muhammadiyya, and it rejects following any of the four schools of Islamic jurisprudence (taqlid), adopting the same methodology as Ismail Dehlavi, who remarked that the agenda of the new order known as Tariqa Muhammadiyya was to purify Islam and reject what they deemed to be bid'ah or shirk.

It is not a tariqa in the sense of an organized Sufi order, but rather a methodology, consisting of a set of beliefs and practices, which according to the order's members, aimed at nurturing the spiritual link between the disciple and Muhammad directly.

== Spread and influence ==
Originally based in Mecca, this tariqa was spread widely in Libya, Egypt, Sudan, Somalia, Eritrea, Kenya, Yemen, the Levant (Syria and Lebanon) and South East Asia (Malaysia, Singapore, Brunei). It also has followers elsewhere, such as in Pakistan as well as Italy and the United Kingdom.

Among the paths adhering to the Idrisiyya methodology include the Khatmiyya, Dandarawiyya, the Ja'fariyya, and the Salihiyya. The order has a great deal of overlap with the Deobandis and Ahl al-Hadith of India, but is opposed to the Wahhabi belief of affirming corporeality for God.

The litanies and prayers of Ibn Idris in particular gained universal acceptance among Sufi orders and has been incorporated into the litanies and collections of many paths unrelated to the Idrisiyya that reject the order's methodology.

== Members ==
- Ahmad ibn Idris al-Fasi, the founder of the Idrisiyya order.
- Mohammed Uthman al-Mirghani al-Khatim, founder of the Khatmiyya path in Sudan and Eritrea.
- Mowlana Abd al-Rahman Nurow. A Somali disciple of ibn Idris who spread the Tariqa Muhammadiyya in Somalia.
- Abu'l 'Abbas Al Dandarawi, Egyptian Sufi and founder of the Dandarawiyya path in Saudi Arabia.
- Salih al-Ja'fari. He edited and published the works of Ibn Idris and revived his order. He founded the Ja'fariyya path.
- Muhammad Abdullah Hasan, follower of the Salihiyya path which rejects seeking intercession from Saints in one's invocation of God, which it labels as Shirk.
- Shaikh Muhammad Said al-Linggi, who introduced a path of this order into Singapore through his followers.
- Shaikh Hafiz Muhammad Amin bin Abdul Rehman from Multan. Idrisiyya was introduced in Pakistan by him.

== Opposition ==
The order's methodology has been opposed by al-Ahbash, who have declared that the Dandarawiyya path have fallen into blasphemy and no longer follow the Quran despite reading it. Unsurprisingly, the Idrisiyya has also been opposed by Barelvis, who see their methodology as being heretical, and similar to Deobandis and Ahl al-Hadith.

== Bibliography ==
- O'Fahey, Rex S. (1994) Enigmatic Saint, Ahmad Ibn Idris and the Idrisi Tradition, Northwestern University Press, Evanston, Illinois by arrangement with C. Hurst and Co. (Publishers) Ltd., London. ISBN 0-8101-0910-7
- Thomassen, Einar & Radtke, Bernd, (eds.) (1993) The Letters of Ahmad ibn Idris. London: Christopher Hurst. A collective volume containing the texts and translations of 35 letters to and from Ibn Idris. The contributors are Albrecht Hofheinz, Ali Salih Karrar, R.S. O’Fahey, B. Radtke & Einar Thomassen. Published by Northwestern University Press, Evanston, Illinois by arrangement with C. Hurst and Co. (Publishers) Ltd., London. ISBN 978-0-8101-1070-0
- Sedgwick, Mark, Saints and Sons: The Making and Remaking of the Rashidi Ahmadi Sufi Order, 1799-2000, Leiden: Brill, 2005.
- Hidigh, Uthman, Anīs al-jalīs fī tarjamat sayyidī Ahmad ibn Idrīs, Mogadishu, n.d., pp. 112–124.
- Dajani, Samer, Reassurance for the Seeker: A Biography and Translation of Salih al-Ja'fari's al-Fawa'id al-Ja'fariyya, a Commentary on Forty Prophetic Traditions, Louisville, KY: Fons Vitae, 2013.
- "The Path". العلم النافع Beneficialilm.com. Archived from the original on 1 July 2014.
