= Al Aidh Emirate =

Emirate in South Arabia (1834–1919)

Al Aidh Emirate إمارة آل عائض (Arabic)
- 1833–1919
- Flag

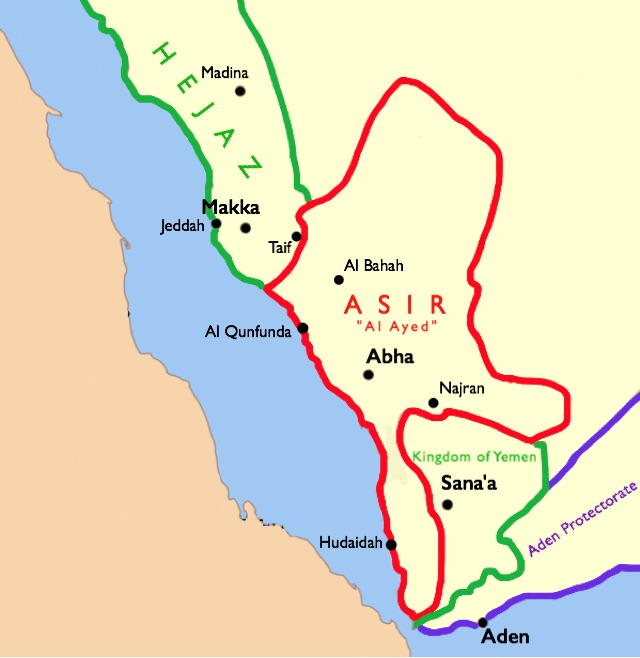
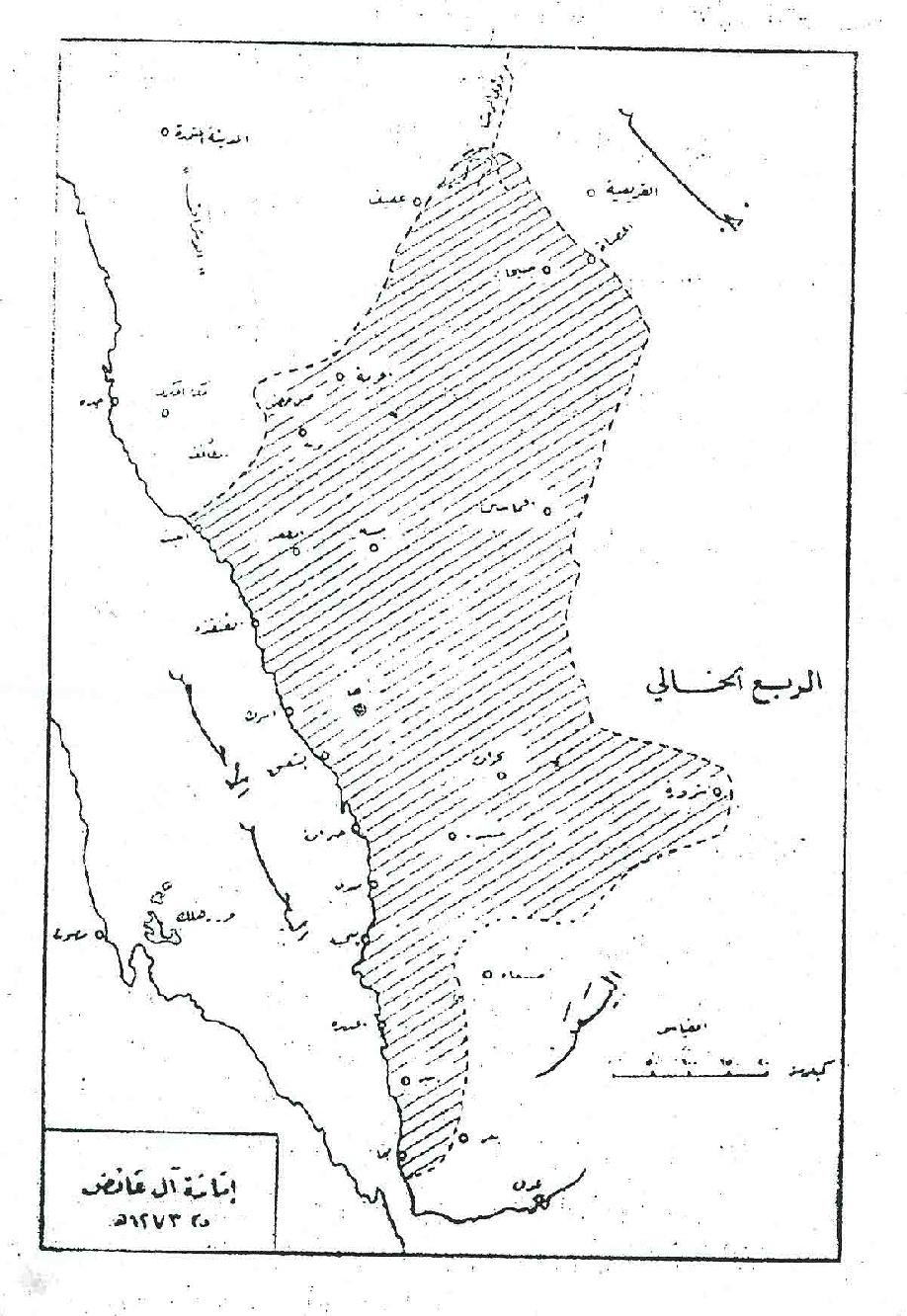
- Status: Independent Emirate (1833–1919); Annexed into Saudi Arabia
- Capital: Abha
- Common languages: Arabic
- Religion: Sunni Islam
- Demonym: 'Asiri
- Government: Emirate
- Emir
  - 1833–1857 (first): Aidh bin Mar'i al-Yazidi
  - 1908–1910/1919 (last): Hasan bin Ali al-Aidh
- History
  - Death of Ali bin Mujathal al-Mughaidi: 1833
  - Saudi conquest: 1919
Preceded by	Succeeded by
Emirate of Nejd	Third Saudi State; Sheikdom of Upper Asir
- Today part of: Saudi Arabia; Yemen

The Al Aidh Emirate (Arabic: إمارة آل عائض) fully known as the Al Aidh Emirate of 'Asir or simply the 'Asiri Emirate, was a Sunni Muslim kingdom that arose in Asir after the demise of Ali bin Mujathal al-Mughaidi. It coexisted with the nearby Emirate of Asir. The Emirate's territories included Taif, as well as domains in Yemen. Their small wars against the Ottoman Empire led to them being temporarily overtaken by the Ottomans, until they withdrew after losing the First World War. The Emirate finally ended in 1919, and 'Asir itself was then annexed by Ibn Saud into the country of Saudi Arabia.

The Emirate was led by rulers from the Aidh family, an Arab ruling family of Arabian Jewish descent. In 1916, the Sheikdom of Upper 'Asir was formed by members of the Aidh family, which had broken away from the Idrisid Emirate of 'Asir.

== List of Emirs ==
- Aidh bin Mar'i al-Yazidi (r. 1833–1857)
- Muhammad bin Aidh (r. 1857–1873)
- Nasser bin Aidh (r. 1873–1875)
- Abdul Rahman bin Aidh (Territory taken over temporarily by the Ottoman Empire)
- Ali bin Muhammad bin Aidh (Territory taken over temporarily by the Ottoman Empire)
- Abdullah bin Muhammad bin Aidh (Last Emir under Ottoman rule before they left in 1908)
- Hasan bin Ali al-Aidh (1908–1910/1919), leader of the Sheikdom of Upper 'Asir

== See also ==
- Emirate of Diriyah
- Emirate of Nejd
- Emirate of Jabal Shammar
