= Ahmad ibn Idris al-Fasi =

Moroccan Islamic scholar, scholar, and jurist (1760–1837)

Ahmad ibn Idris al-Fasi أحمد بن إدريس الفاسي
- Born: 1760; Fes, Morocco
- Died: 1837 (aged 76–77); Sabya, Yemen (Present-day Saudi Arabia)
- Education: University of al-Qarawiyyin
- Known for: Idrisiyya

Ahmad ibn Idris al-Fasi (Arabic: أحمد بن إدريس الفاسي) (1760–1837) was a Moroccan Sunni Islamic scholar, jurist and Sufi, active in Morocco, the Hejaz, Egypt, and Yemen. His main concern was the revivification of the Sunnah or practice of the Islamic prophet Muhammad, and purifying Islam by erasing Bid'ah and Shirk. His followers founded a number of Sufi paths which spread his teachings across the Muslim world.

== Life ==
Ahmad ibn Idris was born in 1760 near the city of Fez, Morocco. He studied at the University of al-Qarawiyyin. In 1799 he arrived in Mecca, where he would "exercise his greatest influence, attracting students from all corners of the Islamic world". In 1828 he moved to Zabid in the Yemen, which historically had been a great center of Muslim scholarship. He died in 1837 in Sabya, which was then in Yemen, and later was the capital of his grandson's country, but is today part of Saudi Arabia.

He was the founder of the Idrisiyya order. It is also called the Tariqa Muhammadiyya, and it rejected following any of the four schools of Islamic jurisprudence (Taqlid), adopting the same methodology as Ismail Dehlavi, who remarked that the agenda of the new order known as Tariqa Muhammadiyya was to purify Islam and reject what they deemed to be Bid'ah or Shirk. The Idrisiyya is not a Tariqa in the sense of an organized Sufi order, but rather a methodology, consisting of a set of beliefs and practices, which according to the order's members, aimed at nurturing the spiritual link between the disciple and Muhammad directly.

== Teachings ==
Ibn Idris' teachings centred on the moral and spiritual education of the individual Muslim. He emphasized the importance of piety, prayer, religious learning (especially the Prophetic traditions), and close following of Muhammad's example. He would send his students to revive the Prophetic Sunnah in different lands. Ibn Idris called for a revival of Ijtihad. His rejection of following of a school of jurisprudence (Madhhab) was based on three concerns: First, the need for following the Prophetic traditions. Second, to reduce divisions between the Muslims. Third, mercy for the Muslims, because there were "few circumstances on which the Quran and Sunnah were genuinely silent, but if there was a silence on any question, then that silence was intentional on God's part- a divine mercy."

He therefore rejected any attempt to fill a silence deliberately left by God, and so to "abrogate one of His mercies". These academic concerns however did not play as important of a role in his teaching as the attention that they attracted from modern academics, and Radtke and Thomassen are correct when they stated that his teachings mainly focused on the moral and spiritual education of the individual Muslim. In a sense, the one teaching underlying all of his thought was a direct and fundamental attachment to God and Muhammad, achieved through piety, minimizing the mediation of any other human authority.

== Followers ==
Ibn Idris' teachings were spread by a group of highly influential followers, among whom were:

- Mohammed Uthman al-Mirghani al-Khatim, founder of the Khatmiyya path in Sudan and Eritrea.
- Mowlana Abd al-Rahman Nurow. A Somali disciple of ibn Idris who spread the Tariqa Muhammadiyya in Somalia.
- Abu'l 'Abbas Al Dandarawi, Egyptian Sufi and founder of the Dandarawiyya path in Saudi Arabia.
- Salih al-Ja'fari. He edited and published the works of Ibn Idris and revived his order. He founded the Ja'fariyya path.
- Muhammad Abdullah Hasan, follower of the Salihiyya path which rejects seeking intercession from Saints in one's invocation of God, which it labels as Shirk.
- Shaikh Muhammad Said al-Linggi, who introduced a path of this order into Singapore by the followers of al-Linggi.
- Shaikh Hafiz Muhammad Amin bin Abdul Rehman from Multan. Idrisiyya was introduced in Pakistan by him.

== Descendants ==
Ibn Idris's grandson, Muhammad ibn Ali al-Idrisi, established a short-lived state, the Idrisid Emirate of Asir.

== See also ==
- List of Sufis
- Idrisiyya

== Bibliography ==
- Thomassen, Einar & Radtke, Bernd, (eds.) (1993) The Letters of Ahmad ibn Idris. London: Christopher Hurst. A collective volume containing the texts and translations of 35 letters to and from Ibn Idris. The contributors are Albrecht Hofheinz, Ali Salih Karrar, R.S. O’Fahey, B. Radtke & Einar Thomassen. Published by Northwestern University Press, Evanston, Illinois by arrangement with C. Hurst and Co. (Publishers) Ltd., London. ISBN 978-0-8101-1070-0
- O'Fahey, Rex S. (1994) Enigmatic Saint, Ahmad Ibn Idris and the Idrisi Tradition, This book contains information on Ahmad ibn Idris' early life and journeys. Published by Northwestern University Press, Evanston, Illinois by arrangement with C. Hurst and Co. (Publishers) Ltd., London. ISBN 0-8101-0910-7
- Radtke, Bernd; O’Kane, John; Vikør, Knut S.; and O’Fahey, Rex S., The Exoteric Ahmad Ibn Idris: A Sufi's Critique of the Madhahib and the Wahhabis : Four Arabic Texts With Translation and Commentary (Islamic History and Civilization), ed. Brill, Leiden, 1999, ISBN 978-90-04-11375-6
- Sedgwick, Mark, Saints and Sons: The Making and Remaking of the Rashidi Ahmadi Sufi Order, 1799-2000, Leiden: Brill, 2005.
- Hidigh, Uthman, Anīs al-jalīs fī tarjamat sayyidī Ahmad ibn Idrīs, Mogadishu, n.d., pp. 112–124.
- Dajani, Samer, Reassurance for the Seeker: A Biography and Translation of Salih al-Ja'fari's al-Fawa'id al-Ja'fariyya, a Commentary on Forty Prophetic Traditions, Louisville, KY: Fons Vitae, 2013.
- Al-Sanusi, Muhammad ibn Ali, 'Kitab al-Musalsalat al-Ashr,' in al-Sanusi, al-Majmu'a al-mukhtara, Manchester, 1990.
