= Invasion of Yemen =

Invasion of Yemen may refer to:

- Saudi–Yemeni war (1934)
- Saudi-led intervention in the Yemeni civil war
