= Farhan, Emir of Loheia =

Farhan (fl. 1762) was an 18th-century Emir of Loheia (modern Al Luḩayyah, Yemen).

A former slave who had risen to high office under the Imam Al-Mahdi Abbas, Farhan was the governor of Al Luḩayyah in the mid-18th century when a group of Danes visiting Arabia on an “expedition of observation and discovery” sought permission to travel through his territory:

"Dola, or Emir, is the title which the Arabs give to the governors of cities. He of Loheia was an Emir, and his name was Farhan. He was a native of Africa, and entirely black; but had been brought into Arabia in his youth, and sold to a man of rank, who was since dead, after having occupied one of the first offices in the service of the Imam. He had given young Farhan a good education, and had obtained for him a small office, in which he gave so much satisfaction, that his merit soon raised him to be Dola of a considerable city. We found him to possess the dignified politeness of a nobleman, the strictest integrity, and the candid benevolence of a true friend to mankind."

Emir Farhan was open-minded and intellectually curious. As the Europeans he had previously met had been only traders he was surprised to learn the Danes had a doctor, a botanist and an astronomer among their party, and at once suggested they stay some time in his territory to pursue their researches before travelling on to their destination, Mokha, under his protection. As the Danes had previously met with far more hostile receptions from governors of Arab cities they were impressed with Farhan's very different approach, and though their schedule did not allow a long stay parted from him after two months with strong regret. The account of their travels written by expedition member Carsten Niebuhr singles him out affectionately as ”the good Farhan” and mentions his particular interest in the scientific instruments the Danes had brought. The parting gifts they chose for him were a telescope and a watch.

They also mention an improvement he had made to the fortifications of Al-Luhayyah and the success of his troops in repelling a raid upon the city.

After Niebuhr's account was published in French, the example of Emir Farhan was cited in anti-slavery literature to disprove racist assertions of the supposed natural inferiority of Africans.
