= Sabya Governorate =

Sabya Governorate محافظة صبياء
- Location within Saudi Arabia
- Country: Saudi Arabia
- Region: Jazan Region
- Seat: Sabya

Sabya Governorate (Arabic: محافظة صبياء) is one of the governorates in Jazan Region, Saudi Arabia. Its seat is the city of Sabya.
