= Muhammad ibn Ali al-Idrisi =

Emir of sabya (1876–1924)

- Emir of Asir
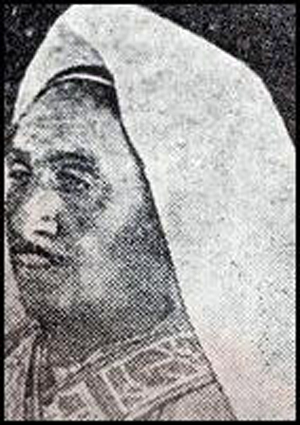

Emir of Asir
- Reign: 1906–1924
- Predecessor: Office established
- Successor: Ali ibn Muhammad al-Idrisi
- Born: 1876; Sabya, Sheikdom of Upper Asir
- Died: March 24, 1924 (aged 47–48); Sabya, Emirate of Asir
- Arabic: محمد بن علي الإدريسي
- Dynasty: Idrisid dynasty

Sayyid Muhammad ibn Ali al-Idrisi (Arabic: محمد بن علي الإدريسي, 1876 – March 24, 1924) was the founder and first ruler of the Emirate of Asir. The grandson of the Islamic scholar Ahmad ibn Idris al-Fasi, al-Idrisi declared himself the Mahdi and launched a jihad against the Ottoman Empire.

== Early life ==
Sayyid Muhammad al-Idrisi was born in Sabya in 1876. His grandfather was Ahmad ibn Idris al-Fasi, an Islamic scholar from Fex who settled and died in Sabya. He was educated partly at Al-Azhar University and partly by the Senussi at Kufra, and subsequently resided at Argo Island, Sudan.

== Reign ==
Al-Idrisi unified the tribes of Asir into the Emirate of Asir in 1906. He declared himself the Mahdi and launched a jihad against the Ottoman Empire.

In March 1909, tribes near south Bayt al-Faqih rose in a small rebellion against Ottoman garrisons. soldiers loyal to al-Idrisi assisted an uprising instigated by tribes living east of Al Luḩayyah, From there, they occupied Qawanis and al-Zaydiyya. On August 23, they captured Al-Luḩayyah. After this initial victory, the tribes between Al Qunfudhah and Maydl also joined al-Idrisi. In September 1909, Idrisi forces captured the town of Muha’il.

The Kingdom of Italy provided aid to al-Idrisi. Al-Idrisi sought British aid against Yahya Muhammad Hamid ed-Din and the Kingdom of Yemen. The British supported him against the Ottomans during World War I and formed an alliance with him in 1915.

== Death ==
Al-Idrisi died on March 24, 1924, in his hometown. A civil war broke out between al-Idrisi's son Ali al-Idrisi and his brother Husayn al-Idrisi. Husayn won after becoming subservient to Saudi Arabia. The Emirate of Asir was later annexed by Saudi Arabia.

== See also ==
- Idrisid dynasty
- Ahmad ibn Idris al-Fasi

== Works cited ==
=== Books ===
- Aksakal, Mustafa (2026). The War That Made the Middle East: World War I and the End of the Ottoman Empire. Princeton University Press. ISBN 9780691262512.
- Clayton, Gilbert (1969). An Arabian Diary. University of California Press.
- Hanioğlu, M. (2008). A Brief History of the Late Ottoman Empire. Princeton University Press. ISBN 9781400829682.

=== Journals ===
- Kühn, Thomas (2007). "Shaping and Reshaping Colonial Ottomanism: Contesting Boundaries of Difference and Integration in Ottoman Yemen, 1872-1919". Comparative Studies of South Asia, Africa and the Middle East. 27 (2). Duke University Press: 315–331.

| Vacant | Emir of Asir; 1906–1923 | Succeeded by Ali bin Muhammad al-Idrisi |
