= Emirate of Asir =

1907–1934 state in South Arabia

Emirate of Asir إمارة عسير (Arabic)
- 1907–1934
- Flag (Note: The text of the flag reads: la ilaha ila Allah, Muhammad-un rasululah, wal-Idrisi waliulla (transl. "There is no god but God, Muhammad is the Prophet of God, and al-Idrisi is the saint of God"))

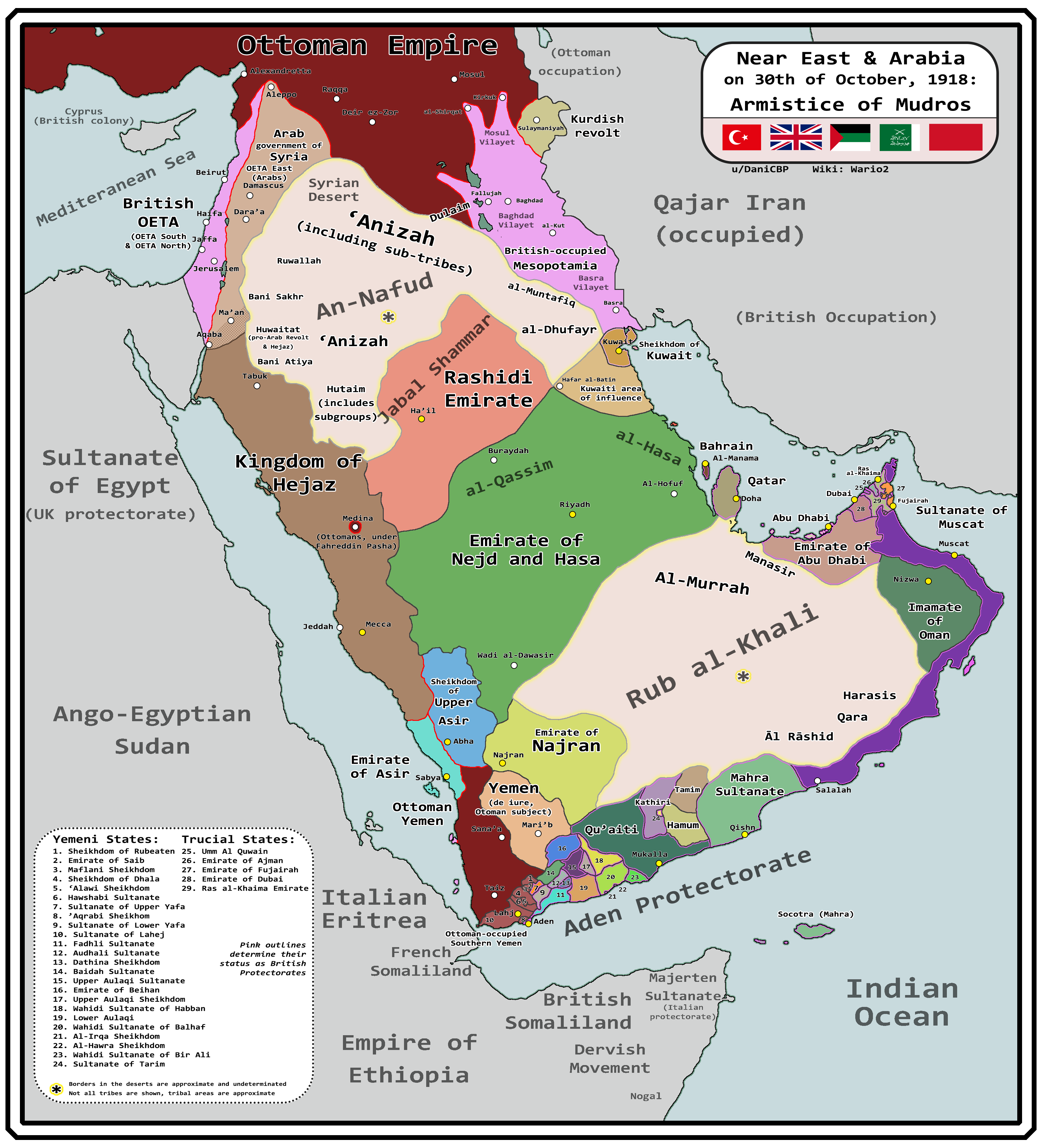
- Capital: Sabya; 17°09′00″N 42°37′00″E
- Demonyms: Idrisi (singular); Adārisa (plural)
- Government: Imamate
- Emir of Asir
  - 1906–1923: Muhammad ibn Ali al-Idrisi
  - 1923–1926: Ali bin Muhammad al-Idrisi
  - 1926–1934: Al-Hasan bin Ali al-Idrisi (Note: On 20 November 1930, the territory was incorporated as a protectorate of the Kingdom of Hejaz and Nejd)
- History
  - Idrisid revolt against the Ottoman Empire: 1907–1916
  - Independence: 1916
  - Idrisid–Mutawakillite war: 1924–1925
  - Protectorate of the Kingdom of Hejaz and Nejd: 20 November 1930
  - Idrisid Rebellion: 1932–1933
Preceded by
Yemen Vilayet
Al Aidh Emirate
Succeeded by
Sheikdom of Upper Asir
Saudi Arabia
Kingdom of Yemen
- Today part of: Saudi Arabia; Yemen

The Emirate of Asir, (Note: Arabic: إمارة عسير, romanized: ʾImārat ʿAsīr) also known as the Idrisid Emirate, (Note: Arabic: الإمارة الإدريسية, romanized: Al-ʾImāra al-ʾIdrīsīyya) was a state that existed from 1907 until its annexation by Saudi Arabia in 1934. Located in the Yemeni Red Sea coast of Tihamah in South Arabia, it was founded by Muhammad ibn Ali al-Idrisi, the great-grandson of ibn Idris, the founder of the Idrisiyya, a Sufi tariqa of Sunni Islam, in rebellion against the Ottoman Empire. The authority of the Emirate was restricted to an 80 mi (129 km) long strip of the Tihamah region and extending about 40 mi (64 km) inland to the scarp of highland Asir al-Sarah. Its capital was Sabya.

It gained the support of Great Britain during the First World War, and flourished until the death of Muhammad al-Idrisi in 1920. Following the collapse of the Ottoman Empire in 1918, the emirate expanded its domains, reaching as far as Hodeidah. The Emirate was gradually absorbed into the Kingdom of Hejaz and Nejd as a protectorate, and was formally annexed by its successor, Saudi Arabia, under the Treaty of Taif in 1934.

== History ==
=== Formation of the state ===
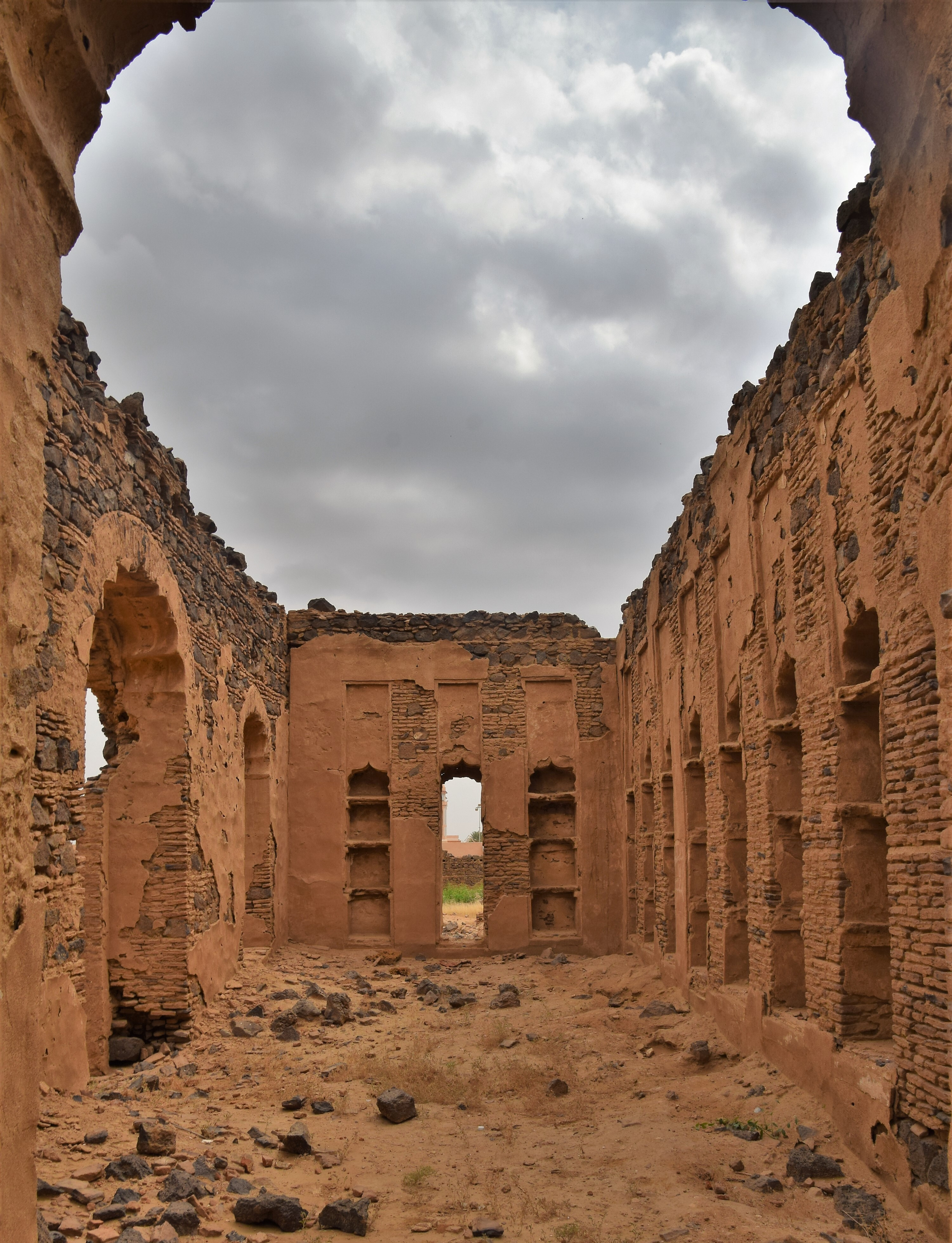
Ruins of an Idrisid-era house in Sabya

In the early 20th century, the Asir region was in dispute. De jure, the region was governed as the Sanjak of Asir, which was part of the Vilayet of Yemen, although the Ottomans only had de facto control over port cities. At the same time, various tribal chiefs ruled the hinterlands. Even in the areas of Ottoman control, anti-Turkish sentiments were brewing, leading to ethnic and sectarian conflicts between the Ottoman authorities and the local population. Due to these circumstances, Muhammad ibn Ali al-Idrisi began spreading his great-grandfather's teachings, as well as calling for the local inhabitants to maintain a stricter adherence to Islam. On 24 December 1908, Muhammad proclaimed himself Imam, after which, in January 1909, many tribes in the Asir region, including the population of Sabya and the Miklaf al-Shami, the Husaynids, the Ja'afarids, and the Damads recognized him as their Imam.

Throughout the autumn of 1909, Muhammad began his first efforts to subvert Ottoman power in the region. Idrisid troops subsequently took over Az Zaydiyah and Al Luḩayyah, and several tribes of Upper Asir aligned themselves with Al-Idrisi, leading to the Ottomans making peace with the Idrisids. In the treaty of al-Hafa'ir, which was ratified in January 1910, Al-Idrisi gained the position of Kaymakam of Asir, effectively making him a semi-independent ruler of the region under Ottoman Suzerainty.

In October 1910, a debate in the court over Sharia law reignited Al-Idrisi's rebellion with renewed strength. The renewed conflict saw military engagements at Abha, Al Luḩayyah, Midi and other locations. The Italo-Turkish War led to Italy assisting Asir with naval bombardment, arms, and ammunition, as the two states united against a common enemy. The outbreak of World War I led the Ottomans to seek a truce, which came into effect on 3 August 1914.

=== World War I ===
Following the outbreak of World War I, the British sought to recruit Arab allies, especially in the Arabian Peninsula, where the Ottoman-allied Kingdom of Yemen was considered a threat to the British Aden Protectorate. The British found Muhammad ibn Ali al-Idrisi a willing ally, since he had been at war with the Ottomans for 7 years. (Note: from 1907 to 1914) In April 1915, the British political resident at Aden, D. G. L. Shaw, had signed a "Treaty of Friendship and Goodwill," making al-Idrisi the first Arab leader to join the British against the Ottomans. The treaty, being the only known document to recognize al-Idrisi's rule over Asir, made the Emirate of Asir a state independent from Ottoman rule under the guarantee of the British Government.

With the British supply of weapons, the Idrisids had honored the treaty and engaged in guerrilla warfare with the Ottoman garrison all over the region of Asir. In 1915, the Idrisids had captured the oil-rich Farasan Islands archipelago from the Ottomans, which the British had recognized, as a part of another treaty signed in 1917, as "part and parcel of the Idrisi's domain, in which his independence is assured."

After the signing of the Armistice of Mudros on 30 October 1918, the Arabian Peninsula became open for inter-Arab rivalry, and Britain was unable to honor the treaties it signed during the war. In 1919, the British, who were in occupation of Al Luḩayyah, Hodeidah, and the Island of Kamaran, handed Al Luḩayyah over to the Emirate of Asir as part of the Anglo-Idrisi treaty signed after the war, and in 1921, they handed over Hodeidah. By handing over Hodeidah to the Idrisids, the state had reached its widest borders.

=== Regional Power Struggles and Territorial Divisions ===
After World War I, fighting continued between the Kingdom of Yemen and the Idrisi in the disputed border areas. The British handover of Al Luḩayyah and al-Hudaydah to al-Idrisi sparked great annoyance from the Imam, who considered al-Hudaydah to be a part of Yemen and wanted to keep access to maritime shipping viable. Britain was supporting al-Idrisi in these conflicts, in part, because of its own problems with Imam Yahya, a man who occasionally raided into British held territories around Aden. It is unclear how much military and financial support the British gave to the Idrisi cause during this time; however, Britain continued to pledge, under the Anglo-Idrisi treaty, that it would defend Idrisi independence from all enemies. Reports from the time show that Britain honored that pledge in the early postwar years, with Ameen Rihani stating "the Idrisi... still gets guns and ammunition to fight the imam of San'a [Imam Yahya]." The intermittent warfare between the Idrisi and Imamate continued in 1919-1923.

=== Relations with the Sharifate of Mecca ===
After the war, the Hashemites in Mecca jumped at the chance to call themselves the liberators of the Arab people. They wanted to pull together the Arab kingdom promised in the McMahon–Hussein correspondence. Sharif Hussein, who led the charge, pictured himself ruling this new kingdom, and he counted on British support, even though the Sykes-Picot Agreement and the Balfour Declaration had already made him doubt Britain's promises. The question of where his kingdom would actually begin and end was messy. Najd sat to the east, ruled by his rival Ibn Saud. Down south, al-Idrisi controlled Asir. Both Najd and Asir had also worked with the British during the war, which made things even more complicated.

After the Paris peace treaty, Sharif Hussein got the title "King of Hejaz", and right away, he started pushing to stretch the meaning of "Hejaz" as far as he could. Deep inland, around al-Qunfudhah, this was where the Idrisi and Sharifian influences ran into each other. The Sharif had long built close relationships with local tribes like Ghamid and Bani Shirir, and that gave him a strong foothold. But the coastal town of al-Qunfudhah turned into a hot spot. The Sharif controlled it, but al-Idrisi claimed it too.

=== The Idrisi-Saudi Settlement ===
Saudi Arabian aspirations faced obstacles from the Sharif and al-Idrisi. They jointly had some of the best farming spots on the Arabian Peninsula, near the Red Sea. Ibn Saud initially adopted a patient approach because he wanted to stay on good terms with Britain. He tried to stop the Ikhwan, from attacking towns outside of Najd. Soon, a chance came for Ibn Saud to get into Asir.

The Asir highlands used to be part of the First Saudi state back in the 1800s, and the people there still liked the idea of Saudi rule. Tribes such as Qahtan and Shahran tribes supported Wahhabism. In 1911, when the Ottomans were in charge, they made Hasan ibn Ali ibn A'id, a descendant of A'id ibn Mari (who fought the Ottomans earlier), governor of Abha. After the Ottomans left, al-A'id family tried to take over the area. Hasan ibn Ali was friendly with the Sharif of Mecca, who probably backed his plan to spread influence south of Hejaz. But nearby tribes didn't like the al-A'id and asked Ibn Saud for help.

In 1920, Ibn Saud sent an expedition to Asir al-Sarah to back up the mountain tribes there. Around April-May of that year, Saudi troops took down Hasan ibn A'id near Abha. Ibn Saud's son, Faisal ibn Abd al-Aziz, and his cousin, Abd al-Aziz ibn Musa'id, were in charge of the Saudi group. Later that summer, Ibn Saud sent some people to talk to al-Idrisi, and they worked out a deal about Asir al-Sarah in summer 1920.

In the fall of 1920, the two rulers signed a treaty saying they needed to specify the tribes and define them so each can do what God wants with the people they control. The agreement split up different tribes between the two. Ibn Saud got control over the Qahtan, Shahran, Wadi'a, and Rufayda mountain tribes, which were some of the most important. al-Idrisi got control over the Tihamah tribes, including the Rijal al-Ma. The treaty also said that both sides had to stay out of each other's business and work together as friends. Both sides appeared to benefit from this arrangement, as it pacified allies of their mutual rival, King Hussein of Hejaz. From al-Idrisi perspective, the agreement relieved them of responsibility for the troublesome A'id family, though at the cost of territorial reduction.

On August 30, 1920 (16 Dhu al-Hijjah 1338 in the Islamic calendar), they drew the lines between Saudi and Idrisi lands. Later, when Ibn Saud and Hassan al-Idrisi made their protectorate treaty, they mentioned the borders that were set in a treaty from October 24, 1920 (10 Safar 1339). Rosita Forbes, who visited Idrisi territory in 1922 and said that there was a deal where goods could go to and from Najd through Asiri ports without any taxes. In return, Ibn Saud would protect the eastern border of the Idrisi territory, but the actual treaty from August 30, 1920, doesn't say anything about that. This discrepancy suggests the possibility of two separate agreements with different dates. The duty-free goods passage Forbes observed may have been part of an informal arrangement to expedite shipments to famine-threatened Najd. Regardless, the dates differ by less than two months, and the Idrisi territorial boundaries Forbes described correspond closely with those established in the Idrisi-Saudi agreement.

The Idrisi territory was now covering the areas from Birk to al-Hudaydah. The line separating the interior territories went from Muhayil downward, keeping Abha and the mountain tribes out. The border of Saudi stretched to Muhayil and to the coast of the Red Sea, and al-Qunfudhah, which was the point where the spheres of Idrisi, Hashemite, and Saudi overlapped. In the year 1922, there was an initiative to sign a tripartite agreement between Muhammad al-Idrisi, King Hussein of Hejaz, and Yahya Muhammad Hamid ed-Din to delimit borders and secure their lands against any possible Saudi move. Zion Rihani reported that during his conversations with al-Idrisi, he wrote a draft agreement for sending to King Hussein in Mecca. The King, in the end, did not want any agreement with either al-Idrisi or the imam, and these initial diplomatic moves, plagued by rivalry and mutual animosity, ended in nothing.

== Government and politics ==
The Emirate of Asir was an Imamate, where the Imam, the religious and political head of state, held absolute power and had the absolute legislative authority. During the war with the Ottomans, the Imam had issued all the commands and orders, and although the state had three other ministers alongside him, they were of no real authority. During the early years of the Idrisi movement, all matters of the law were handled by Muhammad ibn Ali al-Idrisi, although that changed after the movement's development into a state, where a supreme court was established. A police force made up of Sudanese people was established to execute the law, inspect the souk, survey "public morals" and the conducting of prayers.

Coffeehouses, dancing, and smoking were all forbidden within Idrisid territory.

=== Royal family ===
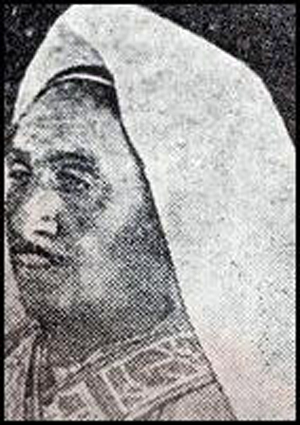
Muhammad ibn Ali al-Idrisi Imam-Emir of Asir (r. 1906–1923)

The Idrisid dynasty, the rulers of the Emirate of Asir in the early 20th century, traced their lineage to ibn Idris (1758–1837). A native of Morocco, his ancestry is linked to Imam Idris bin Abdullah, a Hasan ibn Ali descendant. Ahmad al-Idrisi was a prominent religious scholar and Sufi who spent considerable time in Mecca spreading his teachings before settling in Sabya in the Tihama region of Yemen in 1828 at the invitation of his students. His ideas became popular, but his sons lacked his strong leadership, and the family's influence was mainly limited to mediating tribal disputes.

The political fortunes of the family were revived by ibn Idris's grandson, Muhammad ibn Ali al-Idrisi (1876–1923), who founded the Emirate of Asir. Born in Sabya, he furthered his religious education in Mecca and at al-Azhar in Egypt before returning to Asir at the beginning of the 20th century. He rallied the local tribes under his leadership, capitalizing on the waning influence of the Ottoman Empire in the region. By 1907, he had secured the allegiance of the tribes in Tihama Asir.

=== The ḥukūma ===
Muhammad al-Idrisi established the state's government (ḥukūma) in January 1909, along with a court consisting of 5 qadis. The Idrisi ḥukūma was composed of four wuzara'; Muhammad Yahya Basuhi, Hummud Sirdab al-Hazimi, Yahya Zikri Hukmi, and Muhammad Tahir Ridwan. After the establishment of the government, he was joined by the Rijal Almaa tribes, and his influence spread from Al Qunfudhah to the north, and as far as Midi to the south.

== See also ==
- Quaiti Sultanate
- Sultanate of Tarim
