= Salih al-Ja'fari =

Muslim scholar

Salih al-Ja'fari صالح الجعفري
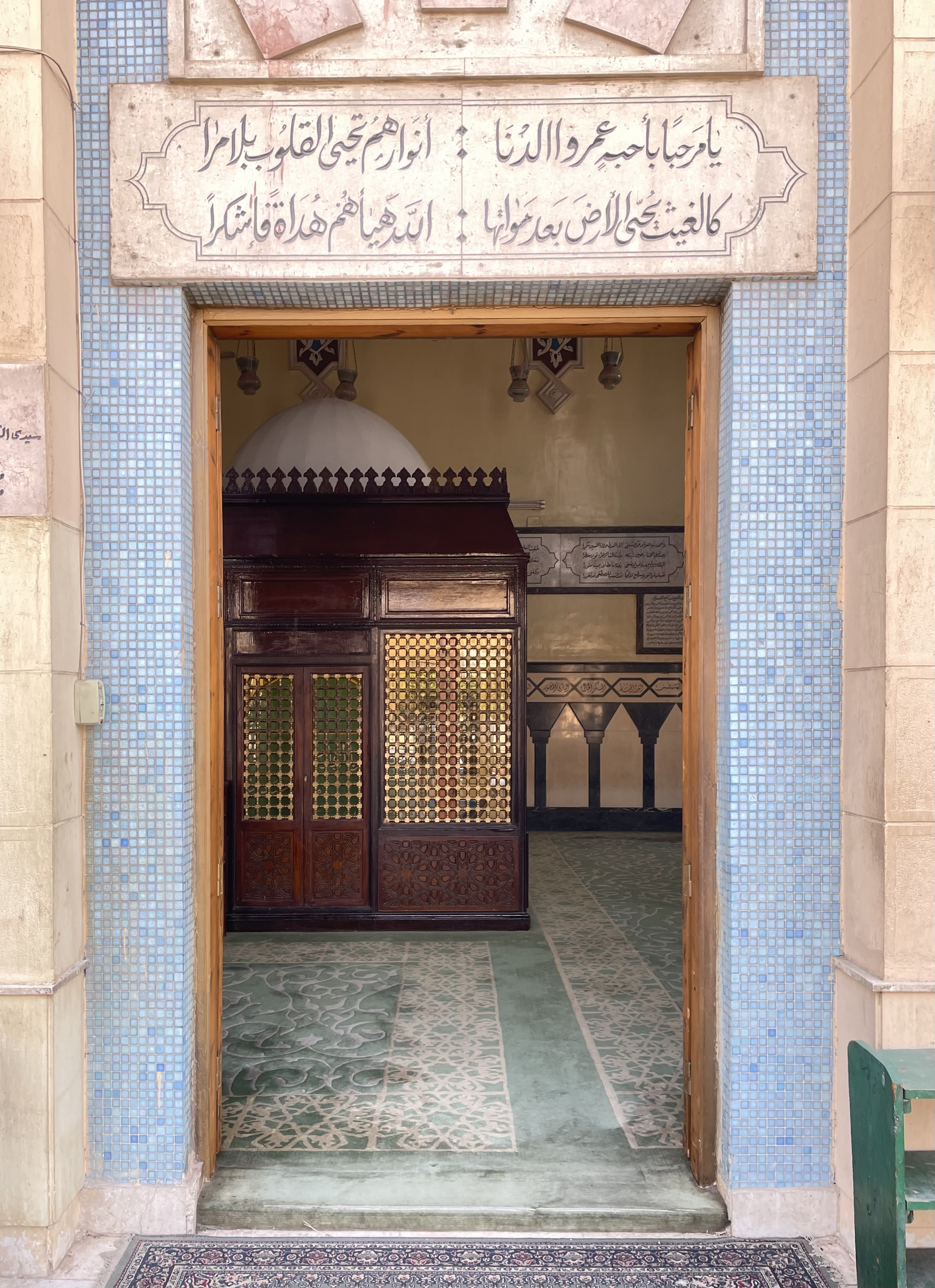
- The tomb of Shaykh Salih al-Ja'fari in Cairo
- Title: Sheikh, Imam

Personal life
- Born: 24 June 1910 Dongola, Anglo-Egyptian Sudan
- Died: 16 April 1979 (aged 71) Cairo, Egypt
- Children: Shaykh Abdul-Ghani
- Era: Modern
- Region: Sudan, Egypt
- Main interest(s): Sufism, Tafsir, Hadith, Fiqh, Aqidah
- Education: Al-Azhar University
- Occupation: bibliographer, Islamic Scholar, jurist

Religious life
- Religion: Islam
- Denomination: Sunni
- Jurisprudence: Maliki
- Tariqa: Ja'fariyya
- Creed: Ash'ari

Muslim leader
- Influenced by: Malik ibn Anas, Abu Hasan al-Ash'ari, Al-Ghazali Ahmad ibn Idris al-Fasi
- Influenced: Ali Gomaa

Salih al-Ja'fari (1910–1979) (Arabic: صالح الجعفري) was a Sufi scholar, who lived and taught in Cairo, Egypt. He was officially appointed as a teacher at the al-Azhar Mosque in 1946 by the Grand Shaykh of the Azhar at the time, though he had been teaching there without an official appointment for more than a decade, and continued to teach there until his death in 1399 AH/1979 CE. He therefore taught there for more than forty years, thirty-three of those as an officially appointed teacher. During the last decade or two of his life, he became the Imam of the Azhar Mosque and one of its most celebrated teachers and orators. He was also a spiritual guide and the founder of the Ja'fariyya tariqa.

== Origins ==
Salih al-Ja'fari was a descendant of the Islamic prophet, Muhammad through his grandson al-Husayn. His ancestors came from the Luxor region in Upper Egypt. His grandfather Salih, after whom he was named, was a Qur'an teacher who moved from Egypt to Dongola in Sudan and established a school for teaching the Qur'an. Salih al-Ja'fari was born and raised in Dongola.

== Life ==
Salih al-Ja'fari was born in 1910 in the northern Sudanese city of Dongola. He learned the Qur'an and the basics of Islamic scholarship at a young age at the hands of his grandfather's students. He moved to Cairo at the age of twenty in 1930 to study at the Azhar Mosque and lived the rest of his life there. As a student, his learning revolved heavily around the sciences of Hadith (the teachings of Muhammad) and Tafsir (the exegesis of the Qur'an). He studied with the most renowned scholars of his age, and was particularly close to a number of the most celebrated scholars of Hadith.

First as a student and then as a teacher, he lived for almost fifty years in the Azhar Mosque. For more than thirty years he lived in a small, specially constructed room inside one of the teaching halls of the Azhar Mosque. He became the Imam of the Azhar Mosque and one of its orators and teachers. His Friday lecture after the Friday prayer was attended by hundreds, or according to some counts, more than a thousand people. His Friday lecture attracted both scholars and laymen. From his position as a teacher in the Azhar and its imam, he attracted students from all over the Muslim world, many of whom became scholars, judges, Muftis, teachers, imams, and spiritual guides in different parts of the world.

== Teachings ==
As a teacher at the Azhar Mosque, Salih al-Ja'fari's teachings revolved around the Qur'an, Hadith, spirituality, and jurisprudence. His lessons began as commentaries and explications of verses from the Qur'an but would also focus heavily on spirituality. The main themes of his lessons were the importance of following the teachings of the Qur'an, loving Muhammad, and being learned in the religion. He also discussed jurisprudence according to the four schools of thought in Sunni Islam, and was himself affiliated with the Maliki School, though he did not restrict himself to it. He had the ability to practice Ijtihad to deal with contemporary issues. Among his main concerns was to deal with the rise of Communism and secularism at the time, as well as to preserve the unity of Sunni Muslims as some modern movements that called for change or reform caused division and debate.

He also dedicated much time to finding the works of the scholar and revivalist Ahmad ibn Idris al-Fasi, editing them, and publishing them. These teachings focused on:

1) The revivification of the Sunna or practice of Muhammad.
2) The moral and spiritual education of the individual Muslim. Ibn Idris emphasized the importance of piety, prayer, religious learning (especially the Prophetic traditions), and close following of Muhammad's example.

== Tariqa ==
Al-Ja'fari followed the spiritual teachings and path of Ahmad ibn Idris al-Fasi, or the Tariqa Muhammadiyya. This was not a Tariqa in the sense of an organized Sufi order, but rather a spiritual method, consisting of a set of teachings and litanies, aimed at nurturing the spiritual link between the disciple and Muhammad directly.

It was sometimes known as the Idrisiyya or Ahmadiyya (not be to confused with the Ahmadiyya of Mirza Ghulam Ahmad) after Ibn Idris himself, and sometimes as the Muhammadiyya after Muhammad. It became known as the Ahmadiyya Muhammadiyya in full. Al-Ja'fari took the litanies and teachings of this path from Shaykh Muhammad al-Sharif, the grandson of Ahmad ibn Idris, who taught in Dongola.

Al-Ja'fari became a spiritual guide in this path, which he helped spread and popularize, attracting thousands of students from Egypt and abroad. He wrote hundreds of poems on spiritual guidance and on love of - and in praise of - Muhammad, as well as supplications to God. Through these poems and the production of his own set of litanies, he prepared the way for the establishment of his own branch of the Ahmadiyya Muhammadiyya. He summarized his path in those lines of poetry:

My path is the Qur'an, knowledge and piety,
and praise for the Messenger of God,
the one who abolishes misguidance.

After his passing, his son Shaykh Abd al-Ghani al-Ja'fari collected and published the poems and litanies of his father, and officially founded the Ja'fariyya Tariqa, or the Ja'fariyya Ahmadiyya Muhammadiyya in full. This tariqa has more than seventy centers throughout Egypt, as well as some in Sudan, Libya, and Malaysia. Its followers also hold regular gatherings of Remembrance of God or Dhikr in other places such as the UK and Saudi Arabia. The Tariqa is active in education and social work and provides many education, medical and social services for the local communities around its centers.

== Works ==
Al-Ja'fari wrote more than fifteen works on various Islamic sciences such as Sufism, Sunni Creed, Hadith and Jurisprudence, and edited many others. These works include his poetry (collected and published in twelve volumes) and his collections of devotional prayers and litanies. Among his works, five have so far been translated into English:

1) Reassurance for the Seeker: A Biography and Translation of Salih al-Ja'fari's al-Fawa'id al-Ja'fariyya, A Commentary on Forty Prophetic Traditions. Tr. Samer Dajani. (Fons Vitae, 2013).

2) Al-Burda al-Hasaniyya wa'l-Husayniyya: An Ode in Praise of the Family of the Best of Creation (Sakina Publishing, 2014).

3) Light for the Seeker: A Daily Litany of Forty Salawat & other Supplications (Beacon Books, 2016)

4) The Luminous Moons (Imam Ghazali Institute, 2021).

5) The Secrets of Fasting (Light of the Azhar)

6) Selections from the Diwan Volume 1 (Imam Ghazali Institute, 2022)

7) al-Salawat al-Jafariyya Bilingual (Imam Ghazali Institute, 2022)

8) Treasure of Remembrance (Light of the Azhar, 2022)

== Bibliography ==
- Dajani, Samer, Reassurance for the Seeker: A Biography and Translation of Salih al-Ja'fari's al-Fawa'id al-Ja'fariyya, a Commentary on Forty Prophetic Traditions, Louisville, KY: Fons Vitae, 2013.
- Al-Ja'fari, Salih, Al-Burda al-Hasaniyya wa'l-Husayniyya: An Ode in Praise of the Family of the Best of Creation, UK: Sakina Publishing, 2014.
- Sugich, Michael, Signs on the Horizons: Meetings with Men of Knowledge and Illumination, 2013.
- Thomassen, Einar & Radtke, Bernd, (eds.) The Letters of Ahmad ibn Idris. Published by Northwestern University Press, Evanston, Illinois by arrangement with C. Hurst and Co. Ltd., London, 1993.
- Al-Sanusi, Muhammad ibn Ali, 'Kitab al-Musalsalat al-Ashr,' in al-Sanusi, al-Majmu'a al-mukhtara, Manchester, 1990.
- Ahmad ibn Idris al-Fasi
- http://beneficialilm.com/the-path/
