= Aidh bin Mar'i al-Yazidi =

- Emir of 'Asir
- Reign: 1833–1837
- Coronation: 1833
- Predecessor: Ali bin Mujathal al-Mughaidi
- Successor: Muhammad bin Aidh
- Died: 1857; Abha, 'Asir Province, southwestern Saudi Arabia
- Aidh bin Mar'i bin Muhammad al-Yazidi al-Mughaidi
- Religion: Sunni Islam

Aidh bin Mar'i al-Yazidi (Arabic: عائض بن مرعي اليزيدي) was the first Emir of the Al Aidh Emirate which ruled over the region of 'Asir. He succeeded Ali bin Mujathal al-Mughaidi as the ruler of 'Asir and was a close friend of him as well. Aidh bin Mar'i was from the Yazid clan of the Banu Mughaidi tribe, hence the epithet al-Yazidi.

== Reign ==
Aidh bin Mar'i took power after the demise of Ali bin Mujathal al-Mughaidi as the latter had already designated him as his successor. Like his predecessor, Aidh bin Mar'i fought against the forces of the Ottoman Empire who were garrisoned in Arabia. He fought against the forces of the Sharif of Makkah, Muhammad ibn Abd al-Mu'in, but was defeated; the conflicts went on until they brokered peace amongst themselves.

Aidh bin Mar'i was fond of construction; he built a large number of mosques and fortresses in 'Asir.

== Death ==
He died in 1857, and was ultimately succeeded by his son Muhammad bin Aidh.

== See also ==
- Al Aidh Emirate
- Ali bin Mujathal al-Mughaidi
- Ottoman-Wahhabi War
