= Saudi–Yemeni war (1934) =

1934 war between Saudi Arabia and Kingdom of Yemen

- Part of the unification of Saudi Arabia
- Territorial changes during the war
Date	20 March 1934 – 14 June 1934 (87 days)
Location	South Arabia
Result	Saudi victory
Territorial changes	Treaty of Taif signed on 14 June 1934: Jizan, Asir, and Najran become provinces of Saudi Arabia; Saudi Arabia leaves and returns control of Hajjah and Hodeidah to Yemen; Enforcement of a 20 years non-aggression pact; Yemen pays Saudi Arabia 100,000 British pounds in war indemnities

Belligerents
Kingdom of Saudi Arabia	Kingdom of Yemen; Supported by: Italy

Commanders and leaders
(Saudi Arabia) Ibn Saud; (Saudi Arabia) Saud; (Saudi Arabia) Faisal	(Kingdom of Yemen) Yahya Muhammad Hamid ed-Din; (Kingdom of Yemen) Ahmad bin Yahya

Strength
30,000 (8,000 regulars)	37,000 (12,000 regulars)

Casualties and losses
- 2,100 soldiers and civilians killed

The Saudi–Yemeni war (Arabic: الحرب السعودية اليمنية) was a war between the Kingdom of Saudi Arabia and the Kingdom of Yemen in 1934.

== Background ==
Ibn Saud, the founder of Saudi Arabia, had named himself King of the Nejd, following the collapse of Ottoman Empire power during World War I. In 1925 he captured Hejaz from the Hashemites. In 1932, he proclaimed the merger of the Nejd and Hejaz kingdoms, establishing the Saudi Arabian Kingdom. Most of the boundaries remained unmapped, unmarked, and undemarcated by treaty. He was described as "a modern Solomon", as "Cromwell of the Desert", and as both the Napoleon and the Bismarck of Arabia.

By 1932, Ibn Saud controlled almost all of Arabia, except for Yemen, and the smaller coastal states which were then British protectorates (Oman, Kuwait, Bahrain, Aden, etc.). Between Hejaz and Yemen were several tribal regions over which the Ottomans had previously held nominal suzerainty, and which both Ibn Saud and the Imam of Yemen now aspired to control.

=== Dispute over Asir ===
In 1923, Emir Idrissi, the ruler of Asir, maintained an uneasy independence between Nejd, Hejaz, and Yemen. He was at peace with his traditional rivals in Hejaz, but in dispute with Imam Yahya of Yemen, to the south of Asir. The area controlled by the independent Idrisid emirate fluctuated during the ten years of its independent existence.

In 1926, the Emir of Asir assented to Saudi suzerainty, and in 1930 it was incorporated into the Nejd and Hejaz Kingdom. The new Saudi kingdom started growing at the cost of Idrissi-controlled areas, as Asir and Jizan were both part of the Idrisid Asir emirate during the 1920s.

A treaty was made in 1931 but soon broken. In November 1933, the Yemenis declared war and advanced on Najran. A peace delegation, which included a son of ibn Saud, was jailed by King Yahya. Ibn Saud's efforts reportedly prompted Imam Yahya to say of him: "Who is this Bedouin coming to challenge my family's 900 year rule?"

=== Treaty of Sana'a ===
In February 1934, at the start of the war, the Yemen Government and the British representative in Aden made a "treaty of friendship", which resolved some of the disputes between Yemen and Britain over Aden and the border between Yemen and the Aden Protectorate, and under which the British guaranteed the independence of Yemen for forty years. The Imam agreed to stop attacking Aden. At this point in time, the British had a "treaty of friendship" with both the Saudi and Yemeni sides in the war.

== The war ==
In March 1934, King Ibn Saud ordered the Crown Prince of Saudi Arabia (later King Saud) "to re-occupy townships in the highlands of Tehama which the Imam of the Yemen has seized". A communique states that "Ibn Saud has tried all diplomatic means of seeking an agreement, but the last just ruler in Yemen, the Imam has persisted in a policy of oppressing the inhabitants and 'eradicating' all who have not surrendered." On 20 March 1934, Saudi Arabia declared war on Yemen. The Saudis advanced quickly, using the help of British planes, while the Yemenis were fighting with swords. The Saudis captured the disputed cities of Hajara and Najran on 7 and 21 April respectively. By 9 April, Haradh had been occupied by the Saudi army (except for a single fort, which fell the next day), and Midi was under siege. On 11 April, the Saudi press reported that Aqabat ash-Shatba had been captured by Saudi forces, from which the Saudi army continued their advance, capturing Yabad, then the Bab-al-Hadfd valley, before finally besieging Baqim. By 18 April, the press reported Saudi advances on all fronts, including north of Saada. By the 21st, Midi was reported to have fallen to Saudi forces.

In May 1934, the Saudi forces pressed forward their attack in the coastal region, occupying Hodeida. The Saudi tribesmen threatened to loot the Indian trading businesses in the city, but were dissuaded by the arrival of British sailors to maintain order. Unrest occurred in Sanaa, due to lack of food. The Imam denied rumours that he had been slain, while his son fled. Both the King and the Imam sought control of Asir. The Imam asked King Fuad of Egypt to intervene in the war. The British sloop 'Penzance' evacuated the British and Indian residents of Hodeida, and 300 foreigners, to Kamaran Island for safety. On May 6, three Italian warships were dispatched to Hodeida to protect Italian interests.

According to western newspaper reports: "Tehama is part of the principality of Asir, which maintained for a few years subsequent to the Great War a precarious independence between the territory of the Wahabi King Ibn Saud and that of the Imam of Yemen. In 1926, it accepted the suzerainty of Ibn Saud, and in 1930, under a new agreement, it was practically annexed by Ibn Saud. A dispute then arose between Ibn Saud and the Imam of Yemen regarding the frontier between Asir and Yemen, and this was believed to have been settled by a treaty concluded in December 1931. In announcing his intention of taking action against Yemen, Ibn Saud's legation in London said: 'The Saudi Government has tried all pacific means through diplomatic channels to come to an agreement with the last just ruler and Imam of Yemen, but he obstinately persists in his aggressive policy by occupying our highlands in Tihamah, oppressing their inhabitants, and eradicating all who do not surrender to his rule.'"

Tihamah refers to the very hot land along the eastern shore of the Red Sea, south of Jeddah, representing the coastal fringe of Hejaz, Asir, and Yemen on the Red Sea.

In May 1934, after capturing Luhayya (1 May) and Hodeida (4 May (Note: Joseph Kostiner and Resort to War: A Data Guide to Inter-State, Extra-State, Intra-State, and Non-State Wars, 1816-2007 say that Hodeida was captured on 28 April, but Isam Ghanem says it was captured on 4 May.)), Saudi forces advanced towards Sanaa, where a battle was expected. The mountains were problematical for their armoured cars and tanks. Neither the British nor Italian forces in the region were expected to intervene. Although the Saudis had better weapons, including tanks, the Yemenis had more experience with mountain warfare. Although the dispute had been brewing for some time, British onlookers predicted that the result would be indecisive. The King demanded the abdication of the Imam, five years control of the border region, and the expulsion from Yemen of the former rulers of Asir.

By 10 May 1934, reports from the war were contradictory. Sanaa was reported to be in upheaval, although the Iman claimed to be in charge. The Yemenis retreated from Hodeida, but claimed to be winning in Najran. The Imam announced a bold plan to advance on Riyadh with 200,000 men, although this attack never eventuated. According to Resort to War: A Data Guide to Inter-State, Extra-State, Intra-State, and Non-State Wars, 1816-2007, the Saudis had decisively won the war on 13 May 1934.

== Aftermath and Treaty of Taif ==
On 12 May 1934, peace negotiations had commenced. Saudi Arabia dropped the demand for Imam Yahya's abdication, but demanded a truce for at least 20 years. It was reported that the Crown Prince of Yemen supported the war, while his father the Imam was in favour of peace. Ibn Saud claimed that he was not interested in taking over Yemen.

On May 26, it was reported that relations were tense and another outbreak of hostilities was likely. However, on 14 June 1934 it was reported that a treaty had been signed between the King and the Imam, guaranteeing 20 years of peace. The last Saudi troops left Yemen on 7 July. Named the Treaty of Taif after the city where it was signed, it demarcated the border line between both countries. Saudi Arabia acquired "temporary sovereignty" over the regions of Jizan, Asir and Najran, while granting borderland tribes the right to cross the boundary without a visa (a move intended to assure the loyalty of these tribes towards the Saudi state). After the Saudi withdrawal, one of the king's advisors wept after he found out how much territory Ibn Saud had given up, to which Ibn Saud reportedly replied saying "You fool, where can I get the manpower to govern Yemen? Yemen can only be ruled by its own ruler," citing the fact that Yemen was a poor country with a population similar to that of his kingdom.

== See also ==
- Najran conflict, a preceding Saudi–Yemeni conflict
- Al-Wadiah War, a subsequent Saudi–Yemeni conflict
- North Yemen Civil War
- List of modern conflicts in the Middle East
- List of wars involving Saudi Arabia
- Saudi–Rashidi War
- Saudi–Yemen barrier
- Saudi Arabia–Yemen border
- Treaty of Jeddah (2000)
