= Sheikdom of Upper Asir =

1916–1920 state in the Arabian Peninsula

Sheikdom of Upper Asir مشيخة عسير العليا
- 1916–1920
- Flag of Upper Asir

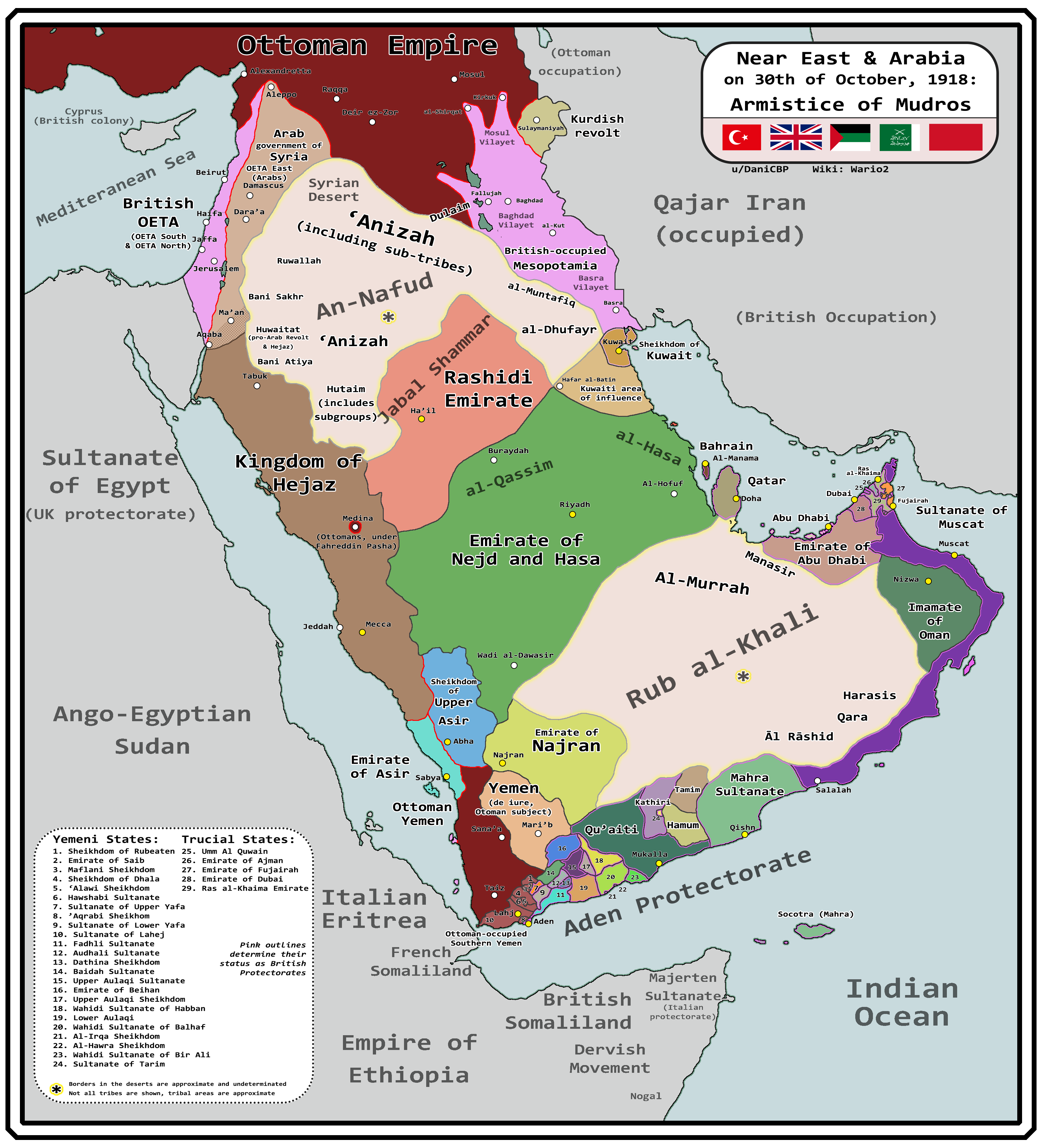
- Upper Asir (blue, down) in 1918
- Capital: Abha
- Common languages: Arabic
- Religion: Sunni Islam
- Government: Absolute monarchy
- Emir
  - 1916–1920: Hasan bin Ali al-Aidh
- History
  - Aidid Revolt: 1916
  - Partitioned between Nejd and Asir: 1920
Preceded by	Succeeded by
Ottoman Empire	Emirate of Asir; Sultanate of Nejd

The Sheikdom of Upper Asir was an Arab state centred on Abha which was established in August 1916 amidst the Arab revolt. In 1920, it was jointly invaded and then partitioned by the Idrisid Emirate of Asir and the Saudi-ruled Emirate of Nejd and Hasa.

== History ==
=== Establishment (1916) ===
Hasan bin Ali al-Aidh became the governor of Abha in 1911; a descendant of anti-Ottoman rebel leader Aidh bin Mar'i al-Yazidi, al-Aidh had been appointed to the post by Istanbul. In August 1916, as the Ottoman hold over Arabia weakened amidst the Arab revolt, al-Aidh established Upper Asir's independence, possibly with Hejazi aid.

=== Vassal of the Idrisid Emirate (1919) ===
On 31 March 1919, amidst a wider post-World War I consolidation of power by the Idrisid Emirate of Asir (i.e. Lower Asir), it was reported that the Idrisi had "obtained adherence" from Upper Asir, and Sharif Hamud was sent to Abha to represent Lower Asir's interests. However, Sharif Hamud was expelled from Abha in December 1919. Afterwards, Idrisi commander Salim Bey attempted to enter the town via negotiations.

=== Battle of Murtaza (mid-1920) ===
Sometime between 17 June and 2 July 1920, Salim Bey occupied a fort called Murtaza and a settlement named Thara (or Sara), two strategically important points on the borders of Upper Asir, and wrote to al-Aidh to let him enter Abha and take possession of the arms and ammunition surrendered by the Ottomans and kept in his custody for ultimate transmission to the Idrisi. al-Aidh replied to this communication with a night-time surprise attack on Salim Bey’s forces with a large force. Salim Bey was forced to retreat from Murtaza and Sara, and fell back to Shaiban. A significant number of Salim's forces deserted to al-Aidh during the engagement. Upper Asir lost 300 troops in the engagement whereas Lower Asir lost 37. By 2 July, Abha was in a state of siege from the west and south, though open from the north and east.

=== Battle of Muhail (July 1920) ===
By 16 July, negotiations between the two Asirs were underway, and the Idrisi were reportedly confident that the situation could be settled without further violence. However, soon after, Upper Asir attacked 100 Idrisi troops at Muhail; 2 ex-Ottoman officers and 20 Arabs fled to Shaibain. The Idrisi were exasperated and by 18 July were collecting a force to advance and punish al-Aidh. The Kingdom of Hejaz promised Upper Asir control over Al Qunfudhah in the event of a successful revolt and provided financial aid, raising tensions between Upper Asir and Ibn Saud.

=== Saudi invasion and collapse (21 July 1920) ===
After the defeat at Muhail, Muhammad ibn Ali al-Idrisi asked Ibn Saud for aid against Upper Asir, and Ibn Saud obliged by sending an Ikwhan force numbering between 12,000 and 14,000. On 21 July, the Idrisi-Saudi force, commanded jointly by Abdul Aziz (Saudi) and Qazi Adbullah Rashid (Idrisi) appeared on the confines of Abha and offered 5 conditions to al-Aidh:

1. He should resign the Emirate of Asir [sic] at once, but should be allowed to remain shiekh of his own tribe, the Beni Mughaid.
2. The Turkish arms and ammunition left in his trust for the Idrisi should be distributed at once in the following manner: ⅓rd to the Idrisi, ⅓rd to Ibn Saud, ⅓rd to be kept in the fort of Abha for purposes of defence, under the supervision of the Italian Representative in Abha.
3. He should give armed assistance against the Sharif of Mecca.
4. He should hand over to the Idrisi, at once, all the principal men of the force that attacked the Idrisi force at Muhail for trial according to the Sharia.
5. No resistance should be offered to the joint forces of Ibn Saud and Idrisi occupying Abha; the forces in question undertaking not to molest or plunder any body.

These conditions were indignantly rejected by al-Aidh, and his cousin Mohammad ibn Abdur Rahman came out with 2000 men of the Beni Mughaid and Beni Malik and 4 guns to give battle to the invaders. The latter who, it is believed, were at first anxious to negotiate further and avoid bloodshed as far as possible, without waiting for the attack, charged, killing about 800 men of al-Aidh’s force. The battle lasted for 2 hours. The remnants of al-Aidh’s men fled in disorder. Ibn Saud’s force entered the town of Abha the same day where, it is said, they gathered a large booty. After the capture of Abha, the Ikhwan looted and massacred the town for three days before departing and leaving behind a 150-man garrison. al-Aidh fled the town but later returned and surrendered.

=== Partition (August 1920) ===
On 30 or 31 August 1920, the Idrisid Emirate signed a treaty with the Saudi-ruled Emirate of Nejd and Hasa which clarified their border and partitioned the former territory of Upper Asir. Abha came until the rule of the Saudis whereas other territories came under the control of the Idrisi.
