= Sheikh Hassan Barsane =

Somali cleric and religious scholar (1853-1928)

Mujahid Sheikh Hassan Barsane
- Sheekh Xasan Barsane
- Born: 1853; Ubaadi, Middle Shebelle, Somalia
- Died: August 18, 1928 (aged 75); Mogadishu, Italian Somaliland
- Burial place: Jiliale, Somalia
- Military career
- Allegiance: Salihiyah Order
- Rank: Sheikh / Commander / Grand Mufti
- Commands: Anti-colonial Resistance Forces
- Known for: Master of ilm al-asraar, resisting Italian Colonialism and Abyssinian expansion
- Conflicts: Defense against Abyssinian expansion; Battle of Balad; Battle of Daafeet; Italian Disarmament Resistance; Battle of Hiilweyne; Battle of Jiliyaale; Battle of Buloburde; Battle of El Dere; Battle of Hareerile

Sheikh Hassan Barsame (Somali: Sheekh Xasan Barsane; Arabic: الشيخ حسن البرصمي; 1853 - 18 August 1928) was a Somali cleric and religious scholar. He was best known for having fought against Meneliks invasions during the early 1900s and having led one of the last major revolts against Italian colonial forces in the Banaadir region during the 1920s.

== Early life ==
Barsame was born 1853 in Ubaadi, a village 68 km west of Jowhar in the Middle Shebelle region of southern Somalia. He hailed from the Barsame tribe, a division of the larger Gaalje'el clans.

After memorizing the Quran during his youth, Barsane sought to further his religious education. He traveled to Mecca to perform the Hajj. Barsane stayed there for three years, meeting along the way Sheikh Mohammed Salih, the leader of the Salihiyah. Barsane thereafter joined Salih's movement.

== Anti-colonial resistance and legacy ==
During Meneliks invasions Barsane fought and defeated several thousand Abyssinian forces at Balad and Daafeet (Wanlaweyn district) in the early 1900s.

After World War I around 16,000 rifles were in the hands of the Somali population, with many in the hand of Sheikh Barsane. The Governor of Italian Somaliland, Cesare Maria De Vecchi ordered Somalis to surrender their weapons during the 1920s. Barsane rejected De Vecchis orders and sent a letter to him in which he affirmed his abidance to Islamic Sharia and total rejection of Italian law.

The Sheikh and his men also fought various battles against Italian troops, including:

1. Buloburde
2. El Dhere
3. Hiilweyne
4. Jiliyaale
5. Hareerile
6. Lafoole

The first expeditions against the Sheikh were unsuccessful but after several bloody battles with colonial troops Sheikh Barsane was captured by the Italians during April 1924. He died in a Mogadishu prison in 1928.

During the Barre regime a high school in Mogadishu was named in Barsane's honor.

== See also ==
- Mohammed Abdullah Hassan
