= Salihiyya =

Sufi mystic order in Sunni Islam

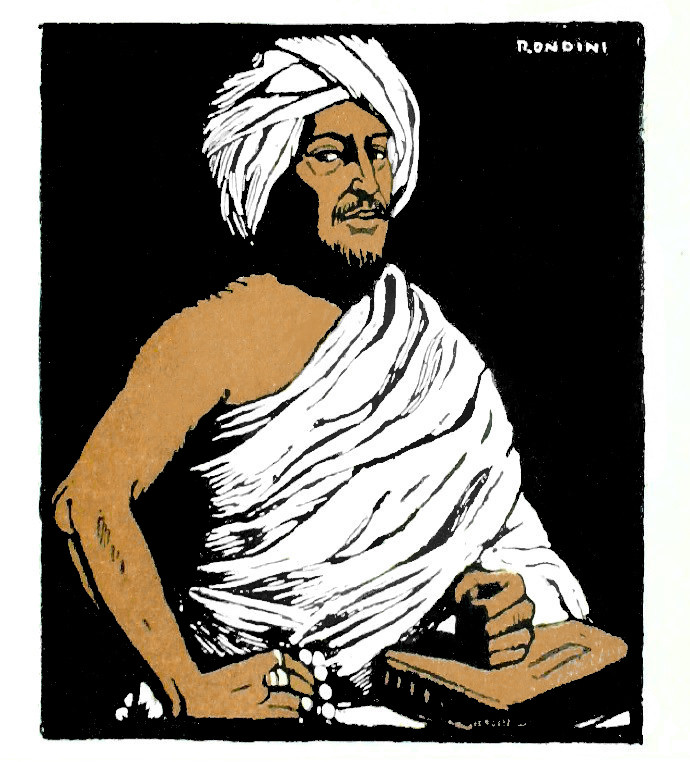
Mohammed Abdullah Hassan

Salihiyya (Somali: Saalixiya, Arabic: الصالحية) is a Tariqa (order) of Sufi Islam prevalent in Somalia and the adjacent Somali region of Ethiopia. The order is characterized by fundamentalism.

== History ==
The order ultimately traces its origins back to the Sufi scholar of Moroccan origin Ahmad ibn Idris al-Fasi (1760-1837). His followers and students spread al-Fasi's teachings across the globe. His nephew, Sayyid Muhammad Salih, was one of them; he spread the Idrisiyya to the Sudan and Somalia, establishing his own eponymous path, the Salihiyya. Sayyid Muhammad Gulid (d. 1918), was instrumental in popularizing the Salihiyya in the Jowhar region of Somalia, while Isma'il ibn Ishaq al-Urwayni spread it in the Middle Juba region.

The Salihiyya path which rejects seeking intercession from Saints in one's invocation of God, which it labels as Shirk and is staunchly opposed to the Qadiriyya order (which is the largest and longest-established in Somalia), taking issue with the Qadiri doctrine of Tawassul (intercession), while the Qadiriyya upheld the traditional Sufi belief in the power of intercession held by Saints. The Salihiyya was also militantly anti-colonial. Mohammed Abdullah Hassan, a Salihiyya shaykh and poet, spread the Salihiyya (particularly in Ogaden) and led an armed anticolonial resistance movement in the Horn of Africa under the auspices of the order.

== See also ==
- List of Sufis
- Idrisiyya
- Islamic fundamentalism
- Ahmad ibn Idris al-Fasi

== Bibliography ==
- Scott Steven Reese: Urban Woes and Pious Remedies: Sufism in Nineteenth-Century Benaadir (Somalia). Africa Today, Vol. 46, No. 3–4, 1999, pp. 169–192.
