= Abu'l 'Abbas Al Dandarawi =

Egyptian Sufi (1898–1953)

Sheikh of Dandarawiya order

Personal details
- Born: 1898
- Died: 1953 (aged 54–55)
- Parent: Muhammad Al Dandarawi (father)

Abu'l 'Abbas Al Dandarawi (1898–1953) was an Egyptian sufi scholar and the sheikh of Dandarawiya which is a sufi order originated from Moroccan Ahmad bin Idris. The order was founded by one of Idris's eminent pupils, Ibrahim Al Rashid, and is known to be the Rashidi Ahmadi branch of the Idrisi tradition.

== Biography ==
Al Dandarawi was born in 1898. His father, Muhammad, was from in Dendera, Upper Egypt, where he was born in 1839. He was educated by Ibrahim Al Rashid, a Sudanese disciple of Ahmad bin Idris, in Mecca and settled in Medina following his travels to East Africa and Syria to disseminate the views of the Ahmadiyya order. He lived there as the successor of Ibrahim Al Rashid until his death in 1910.

Al Dandarawi had two siblings, a younger brother, Abdul Wahap and a sister. Following the death of his father Al Dandarawi succeeded him as the sheikh of the order. He was extremely popular among his Sudanese followers. Al Dandarawi had to leave Mecca in 1941 due to a dispute with King Abdulaziz and Wahhabists over the celebration of Mawlid or the observance of the birthday of the Islamic prophet Muhammad.

Al Dandarawi died in 1953, and his son Abu Fadl bin Abul Abbas Al Dandarawi succeeded him as the sheikh of the order.
