= Sabya =

City in the Jazan Province

Sabya Şabyā
- City
- Location in Saudi Arabia
- Coordinates: 17°08′56″N 42°37′33″E
- Country: Saudi Arabia
- Province: Jazan Province

Population
  - Total: 228,375
- Time zone: UTC+3 (EAT)
  - Summer (DST): UTC+3 (EAT)

Sabya (Arabic: صبياء) is a city in the Sabya Governorate of the Jazan Province, in southwestern Saudi Arabia. Before it was annexed by Saudi Arabia, it was the capital city of the Emirate of Asir.
