= Midi district =

Coordinates: 16°15′N 43°00′E

Midi District مديرية ميدي
- District
- Interactive map of Midi District
- Country: Yemen
- Governorate: Hajjah
- Occupation: Saudi Arabia

Population (2003)
  - Total: 16,604
- Time zone: UTC+3 (Yemen Standard Time)

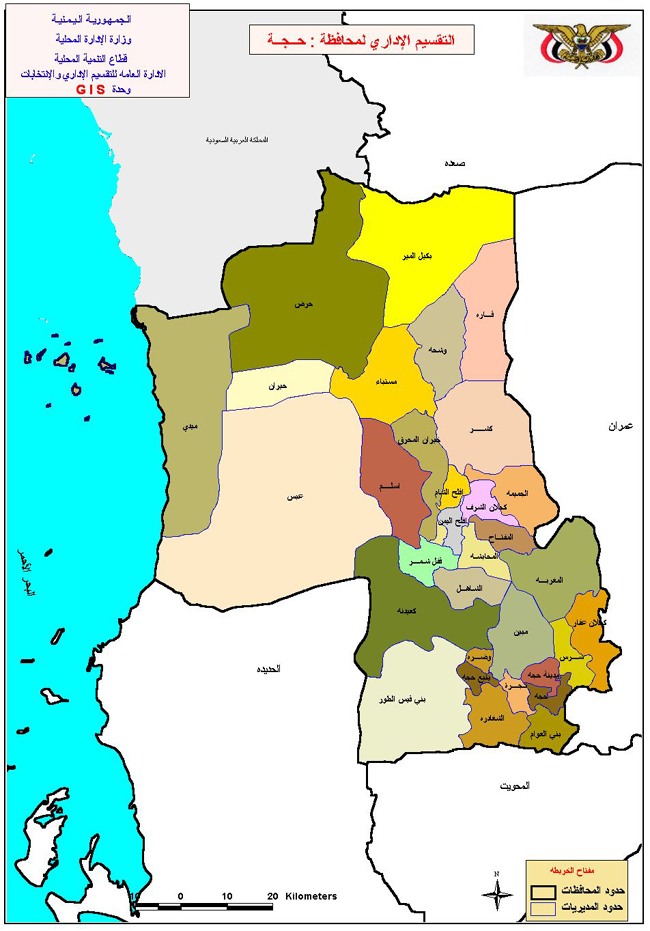
The districts of the Hajjah governate

Midi District (Arabic: مديرية ميدي) is a district of the Hajjah Governorate, Yemen. As of 2003, the district had a population of 16,604 inhabitants.

== Yemeni Civil War ==
The district fell under Hadi government control, then transferred to Saudi Arabia, after the battle of Port Midi in early 2016.
