= Al Luḩayyah =

- Location in Yemen
- Coordinates: 15°23′0″N 42°33′37″E
- Country: Yemen
- Governorate: Al Hudaydah
- 2,656
- Time zone: UTC+3 (Yemen Standard Time)

Al Luḩayyah (also spelt Luhayyah, Loheia, Luhaiyah, or Loheiya; Arabic: اللحية) is a town on the Tihamah coastal plain, Yemen. It is located at around 15°42′14″N 42°41′31″E. The port lies 6 km (4 miles) southwest of Al Luḩayyah, partially protected by the offshore island of Al-Urmak.

== History ==
According to local tradition the town was founded at the dawn of the 15th century by a holy man, Sheikh Ali az-Zayla'i, named after the city he was from Zeila in Somalia. The interest in the local saint (who is buried in the local mosque) quickly attracted new settlers, and within a century, the unassuming town developed from around the mid-15th century into a bustling town, and a substantial center of the export trade in coffee. By the end of the 18th century, the az-Zayla'i family was still regarded as a holy family and Al Luḩayyah was a walled and well-fortified town. It was under the direction of the Emir Farhan when an expedition from Denmark visited the city and described their reception.

From about 1800 onwards Al Luḩayyah was a part of the Ottoman Empire, and in 1912 suffered damage during the Italo-Turkish War. It was captured in 1918 in a joint attack by the British Navy and forces loyal to the Idrisi rulers of Asir, under whose control it remained until 1925 when it again came under Yemeni authority. It was seized in spring 1934 by the Saudis, who returned it however in the same year under the Treaty of Al-Ta'if.

The town was formerly a trading centre of significance but has declined in the last two centuries, especially as seaborne traffic has moved to more modern facilities at Ahmadi, the port of Al Hudaydah. The population is estimated at under 3,000.

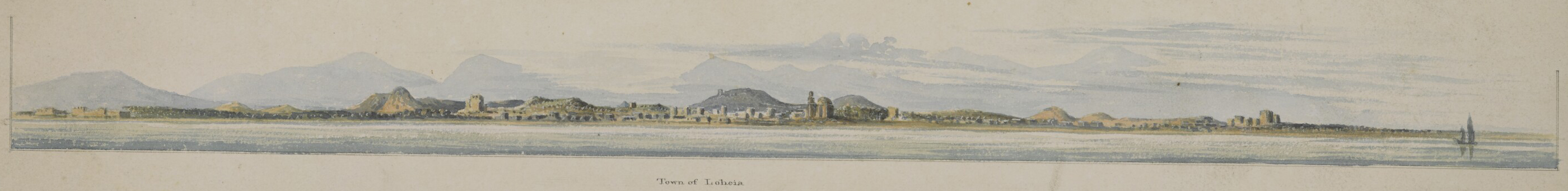
'Town of Loheia', sketched by Thomas Elwon between 1829 and 1834.
