= Hodeidah =

Port city in Yemen

Hodeidah الْحُدَيْدَة Hodeidah
- City
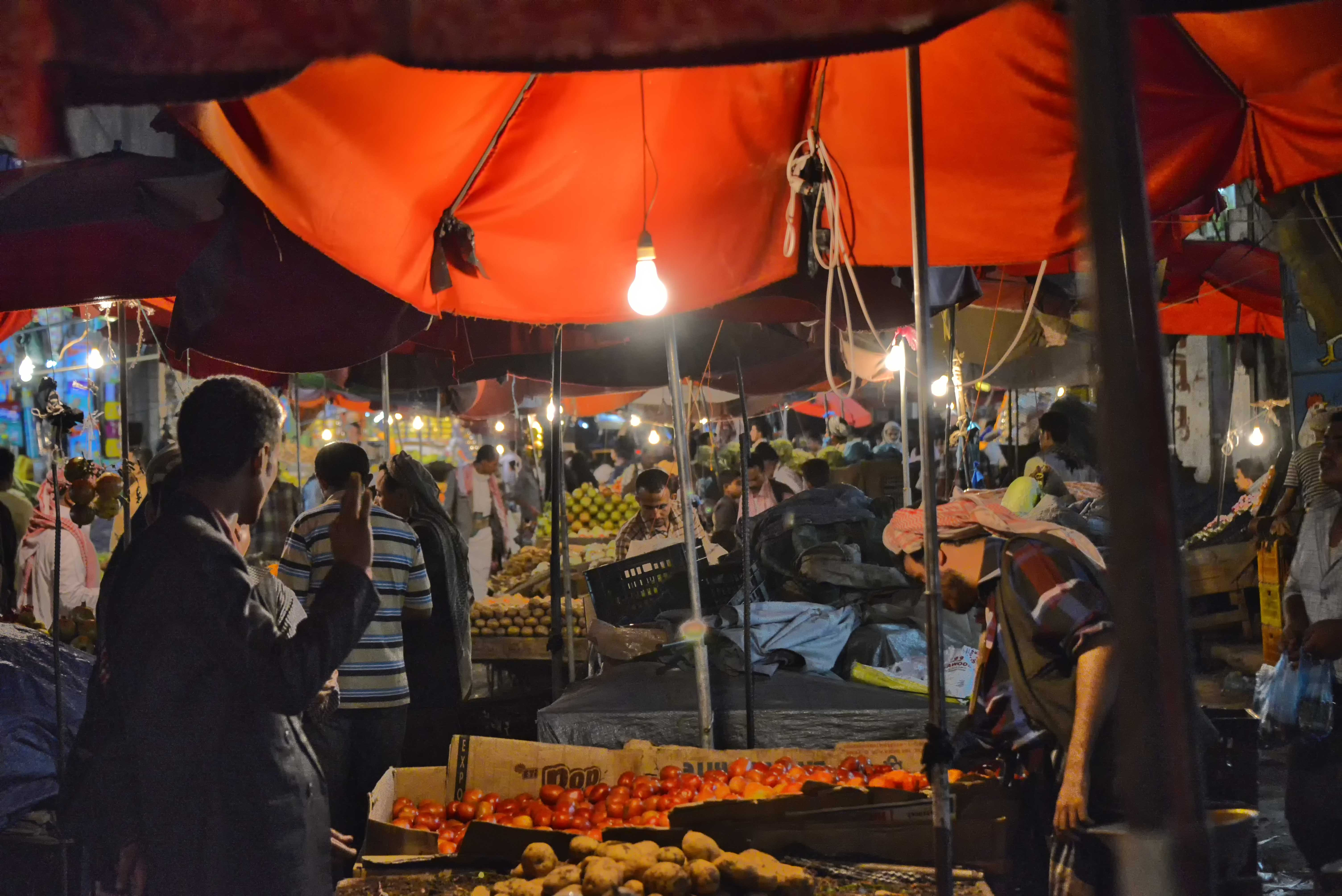
- Market in Hodeidah
- Nickname: Bride of the Red Sea
- Location within Yemen
- Coordinates: 14°48′08″N 42°57′04″E
- Country: Yemen
- Governorate: Hodeidah
- Administration: United Nations (de jure); Houthis (de facto)
- Elevation: 17 m (56 ft)

Population (2004)
  - City: 404,062 ▲
  - Estimate (2026): 4,412,787
  - Rank: 4th in Yemen
  - Urban: 715,206
  - Metro: 812,000
- Time zone: UTC+3 (AST)

Hodeidah (Arabic: الْحُدَيْدَة, romanized: al-ḥudayda), also transliterated as Hodeda, Hodeida, Hudaida or al-Hudaydah, is the fourth-largest city in Yemen, its principal port on the Red Sea, and the capital of Hodeidah Governorate. As of 2023, it had an estimated population of 735,000.

== History ==
In Islamic chronicles, the name Hodeidah was first mentioned in the year 1454/55. The city's importance grew in the 1520s, when the Ottomans took over the Yemeni Tihāmah region.

In the 1830s, Hodeidah was controlled by Ibrahim Pasha's troops, which turned over its administration to Sherif Husayn ibn Ali Haydar. In 1849, it became part of the Yemen Eyalet.

The Malay writer Abdullah bin Abdul Kadir visited Hodeidah on his pilgrimage to Mecca in 1854, and describes the city in his account of the journey, mentioning that the custom of chewing khat was prevalent in the city at this time.

During the 19th century, Hodeidah had a large slave market. The slaves came from the Oromia region of modern Ethiopia.

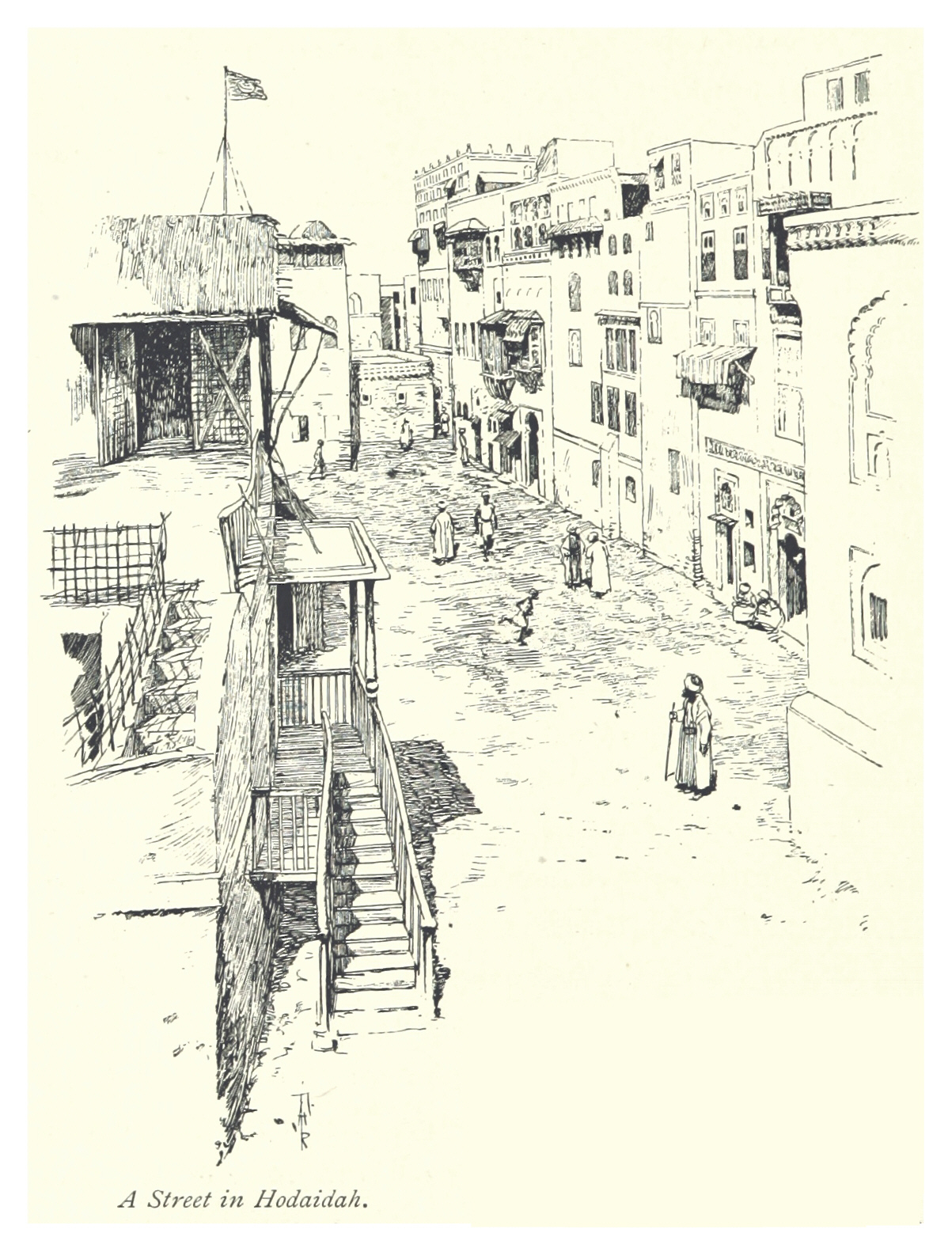
A street in Hodaidah in 1893

In 1914, during World War I, Imperial German troops led by Major Freiherr Othmar von Stotzingen established "Stotzingen-Mission", a wireless station, at Hodeidah. The station was used during the Arab Revolt to relay communications from Constantinople (now Istanbul) to German East Africa as well as broadcast propaganda to Anglo-Egyptian Sudan, Somaliland and Abyssinia.

In January 1919, following the collapse of Ottoman Yemen in World War I, Britain occupied Hodeidah. Britain evacuated the city on 29 January 1921, allowing it to be taken by the Emirate of Asir. A British report dating to 25 March 1925 reported on an offensive by the Kingdom of Yemen against Asir and mentioned that, while Hodeidah remained outside the control of Yemeni troops, it would be occupied "in due course". Yemen captured the city in April 1925.

The city was briefly occupied by Saudi forces during the Saudi–Yemeni war of 1934.

A major fire in January 1961 destroyed much of Hodeidah. The city was rebuilt, particularly its port facilities, with Soviet aid. A highway to Sanaa, the capital, was completed in 1961. The city was also the site of a Soviet naval base in the 1970s and 1980s.

On 20 July 2024, during the Gaza war, the city was the target of an Israeli air raid in response to repeated Houthi attacks against Israel and an attack on Tel Aviv that resulted in the death of a civilian. The Israeli strike targeted port oil facilities and a power plant, resulting in a large fire killing six and wounding 87. The IDF said that they targeted military facilities.

=== Yemeni civil war ===
The Hodeidah Port plays a crucial role in allowing food to be imported into the country. This role has been disrupted several times over the course of the Yemeni civil war.

In June 2018, pro-Hadi government forces with the backing of the United Arab Emirates and Saudi Arabia entered the port in an effort to dislodge Houthi forces. Due to the risk of a humanitarian crisis if the port was besieged, the United Nations attempted to secure an agreement with the Houthis to place the port under UN control. These efforts were unsuccessful until 13 December 2018, when there was an announcement by UN Secretary-General António Guterres that the two opposing forces had reached an agreement on a ceasefire. As a result, the UN Mission to Support the Hodeidah Agreement was established to oversee the agreement. In July 2024, the port was attacked by Israel in retaliation for the Houthi drone strike on Tel Aviv.

== Economy ==
Situated on the Red Sea, Hodeidah is an important port, exporting coffee, cotton, dates and hides. It was developed as a seaport in the mid-19th century by the Ottoman Turks. As of June 2018, three quarters of humanitarian and commercial cargo entering Yemen arrived via Hodeidah Port. It serves as the entry point for Yemen's humanitarian aid and around 70% of commercial imports. The port of Ras Isa is slightly north of Hodeidah proper, and is the terminus of the Marib–Ras Isa oil pipeline from inland Yemen, with a major storage and offloading vessel named FSO Safer moored offshore, though idled since the beginning of the Yemeni Civil War in 2015.

In 1920, the British described Hodeidah's port as being a "poor harbour." With two entrances, it was only able to provide adequate storage and shelter for small boats, with larger boats and ships having to dock over two miles away. In 1908, a new pier was built, which had trouble with depth, leading most imported items to be dumped on the beach instead of delivered by dock. Coal was often available for visiting vessels. A new harbour was built 10 miles northwest of the town by the Ottoman government, with a small train line leading to Hodeidah, and connected to the Sana-Hodeidah Railway. A French company built the rail system, which was halted upon the Italo-Turkish War breakout. In 1909, the port was bringing in less than the port at Jeddah. That year, 172 steam ships visited the port. The majority of the goods were from the United Kingdom, followed by Italy, Russia and Germany. German imports had grown from 1905 to 1909, with British shipping declining. Despite struggles with a good quality harbour, the town was described as being the centre of dhow building.

The city was known for producing striped coarse cotton cloth, woven by hand. The artisans making the cloth were relocated to Hodeidah from Zabīd and Beit el-Faki due to tribal conflict. The city was also a centre for tanning and sandal making.

In the late 19th century, Hodeidah was a major exporter of coffee, although its export business shifted to Aden in the early 20th century due to more secure routes there. Hodeidah had to transport its goods through Yemen and Indian ports for security reasons, making export to the United Kingdom troublesome. During this time period, the region imported cereal and rice from India, cotton from Manchester, England and the United States, iron and steel from Germany, and general goods from Italy and Austria. As of 1920, the city was exporting fuller's earth, hides, and coffee. The coffee produced in Hodeidah was considered some of the finest in the region.

== Topography ==
Hodeidah is generally composed of a flat plain that gently slopes towards the sea. The elevated areas consist mainly of small sand dunes or remnants of inland masses. Geologically, this coastal plain is part of the Red Sea rift valley, covered by recent deposits, which can be divided into two categories, though it’s difficult to distinguish their boundaries. Near the Red Sea coast, the deposits are primarily marine formations from the late Tertiary and Quaternary periods, covered by modern wind-blown sand deposits. In contrast, near the foothills of the mountains, deltaic deposits are found, some of which are coarse, consisting of large gravel and rock fragments, while others are finer particles carried by streams descending from the mountains. These coarse deltaic deposits gradually disappear under sand deposits, and at the boundary between the two, freshwater springs emerge.

The province's surface can be divided into three sections:

Coastal Plains: The majority of Hodeidah's land lies within the Tihama coastal plain, which stretches from al-Luhayyah in the north to al-Khawkhah in the south, spanning approximately 300 kilometers in length and 60 to 150 kilometers in width. This plain is traversed by several valleys, which are outlets for flood and rainwater flowing from the internal highlands of the province and from the highlands and mountains of the neighboring provinces of Ibb, Dhamar, Sana'a, al-Mahwit, and Hajjah, eventually emptying into the Red Sea. Major valleys include, Wadi Mour, Wadi Siham, Wadi Zabid, among others.

Mountain Highlands: Notable mountains include Jabal Ras and Jabal Bura, both reaching elevations of 2,000 to 2,400 meters above sea level.

Islands: There are over 40 Yemeni islands in the Red Sea off the coast of Hodeidah, with notable ones being Kamaran, Hanish Islands, and Taqfash Island.

== Climate ==
Hodeidah has a hot desert climate (Köppen climate classification: BWh).

Climate data for Hodeidah
Month	Jan	Feb	Mar	Apr	May	Jun	Jul	Aug	Sep	Oct	Nov	Dec	Year
Mean daily maximum °C (°F)	28.8 (83.8)	29.2 (84.6)	30.4 (86.7)	32.6 (90.7)	34.3 (93.7)	35.9 (96.6)	36.7 (98.1)	36.4 (97.5)	35.7 (96.3)	35.7 (96.3)	31.4 (88.5)	29.1 (84.4)	33.0 (91.4)
Daily mean °C (°F)	25.1 (77.2)	25.9 (78.6)	27.7 (81.9)	29.5 (85.1)	31.3 (88.3)	32.6 (90.7)	33.0 (91.4)	32.6 (90.7)	32.0 (89.6)	30.3 (86.5)	27.2 (81.0)	25.5 (77.9)	29.4 (84.9)
Mean daily minimum °C (°F)	20.3 (68.5)	21.7 (71.1)	23.1 (73.6)	25.6 (78.1)	26.7 (80.1)	28.3 (82.9)	28.4 (83.1)	28.2 (82.8)	27.2 (81.0)	25.0 (77.0)	22.6 (72.7)	20.0 (68.0)	24.8 (76.6)
Average rainfall mm (inches)	18 (0.7)	15 (0.6)	12 (0.5)	33 (1.3)	3 (0.1)	0 (0)	5 (0.2)	12 (0.5)	4 (0.2)	3 (0.1)	0 (0)	2 (0.1)	107 (4.2)
Average relative humidity (%)	81	81	82	82	79	76	75	76	72	76	78	82	78
Mean daily sunshine hours	8.6	8.5	8.3	9.0	9.4	7.4	6.7	7.2	7.6	9.5	9.8	8.9	8.4
Source: Arab Meteorology Book

== See also ==
- Hodeida International Airport
